= List of flag bearers for Niger at the Olympics =

Niger at the Olympics
- IOC code: NIG
- NOC: Nigerien Olympic and National Sports Committee
- Medals: Gold 0 Silver 1 Bronze 1 Total 2

Summer appearances
- 1964; 1968; 1972; 1976–1980; 1984; 1988; 1992; 1996; 2000; 2004; 2008; 2012; 2016; 2020; 2024

This is a list of flag bearers who have represented Niger at the Olympics.

Flag bearers carry the national flag of their country at the opening ceremony of the Olympic Games.

#	Event year	Season	Flag bearer	Sport
1	1964	Summer		
2	1968	Summer		
3	1972	Summer	Issaka Dabore	Boxing
4	1984	Summer	Boubagar Soumana	Boxing
5	1988	Summer	Hassan Karimou	Athletics
6	1992	Summer		
7	1996	Summer	Abdou Manzo	Athletics
8	2000	Summer	Mamane Sani Ali	Athletics
9	2004	Summer	Abdou Alassane Dji Bo	Judo
10	2008	Summer	Mohamed Alhousseini	Swimming
11	2012	Summer	Moustapha Abdoulaye Hima	Boxing
12	2016	Summer	Abdoul Razak Issoufou	Taekwondo
13	2020	Summer	Abdoul Razak Issoufou	Taekwondo
13	2020	Summer	Roukaya Mahamane	Swimming
14	2024	Summer	Abdoul Razak Issoufou	Taekwondo
14	2024	Summer	Samira Awali Boubacar	Athletics

== See also ==
- Niger at the Olympics
