= 2016 FINA World Swimming Championships (25 m) – Men's 100 metre breaststroke =

Men's 100 metre breaststroke at the 2016 FINA World Swimming Championships (25 m)
- Venue: WFCU Centre
- Dates: 6 December (heats and semifinals); 7 December (final)
- Competitors: 99 from 72 nations
- Winning time: 56.77

Medalists
gold medal	Marco Koch	Germany
silver medal	Vladimir Morozov	Russia
bronze medal	Fabio Scozzoli	Italy

The Men's 100 metre breaststroke competition of the 2016 FINA World Swimming Championships (25 m) was held on 6 and 7 December 2016.

== Records ==
Prior to the competition, the existing world and championship records were as follows.

	Name	Nation	Time	Location	Date
World record	Cameron van der Burgh	South Africa	55.61	Berlin	15 November 2009
Championship record	Felipe França Silva	Brazil	56.29	Doha	4 December 2014

== Results ==
=== Heats ===
The heats were held at 12:10.

Rank	Heat	Lane	Name	Nationality	Time	Notes
1	10	5	Marco Koch	Germany	57.01	Q
2	10	6	Ilya Shymanovich	Belarus	57.39	Q, NR
3	8	4	Cody Miller	United States	57.41	Q
4	8	2	Yan Zibei	China	57.47	Q, NR
5	8	5	Felipe Lima	Brazil	57.68	Q
5	9	5	Felipe França Silva	Brazil	57.68	Q
7	8	3	Fabio Scozzoli	Italy	57.70	Q
8	10	4	Vladimir Morozov	Russia	57.73	Q
9	9	4	Cameron van der Burgh	South Africa	57.78	Q
10	6	0	Carlos Claverie	Venezuela	57.81	Q. NR
11	9	3	Oleg Kostin	Russia	57.93	Q
12	9	7	Nic Fink	United States	57.97	Q
13	9	6	Ross Murdoch	Great Britain	58.03	Q
14	8	1	Andrew Willis	Great Britain	58.04	Q
15	10	2	Yoshiki Yamanaka	Japan	58.10	Q
16	10	3	Giedrius Titenis	Lithuania	58.18	Q
17	10	1	Kazuki Kohinata	Japan	58.30	
18	1	9	Peter Stevens	Slovenia	58.35	
18	7	6	Richard Funk	Canada	58.35	
20	10	0	Andrius Šidlauskas	Lithuania	58.51	
21	9	2	Tommy Sucipto	Australia	58.52	
22	10	9	Erik Persson	Sweden	58.55	
23	6	8	Jason Block	Canada	58.62	
24	8	7	Johannes Skagius	Sweden	58.64	
25	7	1	Petr Bartůněk	Czech Republic	58.73	NR
26	9	8	Martin Allikvee	Estonia	58.80	
27	10	7	Roman Trussov	Kazakhstan	58.84	
28	10	8	Martin Liivamägi	Estonia	58.94	
29	9	1	Li Xiang	China	59.03	
30	8	0	Jean Dencausse	France	59.13	
31	7	4	Jonas Coreelman	Belgium	59.15	
32	8	9	Andrei Tuomola	Finland	59.25	
33	6	5	Chao Man Hou	Macau	59.30	NR
34	6	6	Renato Prono	Paraguay	59.36	NR
35	9	9	Marek Botik	Slovakia	59.40	
36	7	0	Christopher Rothbauer	Austria	59.54	
37	6	4	Azad Al-Barazi	Syria	59.55	NR
38	9	0	Ari-Pekka Liukkonen	Finland	59.60	
39	8	8	Giulio Zorzi	South Africa	59.67	
40	7	2	Kristijan Tomić	Croatia	59.74	
41	6	1	Youssef Elkamash	Egypt	59.82	NR
42	7	5	Nikolajs Maskaļenko	Latvia	59.87	
43	6	9	Jordy Groters	Aruba	1:00.06	NR
44	6	7	Khoo Chien Yin Lionel	Singapore	1:00.22	NR
45	6	3	Radomyos Matjiur	Thailand	1:00.29	NR
45	7	3	Martin Schweizer	Switzerland	1:00.29	
47	7	9	Saša Gerbec	Croatia	1:00.30	
48	7	8	Tsui Hoi Tung Ronald	Hong Kong	1:00.32	
49	8	6	Jorge Murillo	Colombia	1:00.47	
50	6	2	Daniils Bobrovs	Latvia	1:00.82	
51	5	6	James Deiparine	Philippines	1:01.09	
52	5	8	Lee Hsuan-yen	Chinese Taipei	1:01.35	
53	5	7	Marko Blaževski	Macedonia	1:01.38	NR
54	5	3	Gregory Penny	United States Virgin Islands	1:01.51	NR
55	5	4	Julian Fletcher	Bermuda	1:01.56	NR
56	5	5	Viktor Vilbergsson	Iceland	1:01.63	
57	5	9	Ljubomir Agow	Bulgaria	1:01.69	
58	4	3	Sultan Bukeev	Kyrgyzstan	1:01.77	
59	5	1	James Lawson	Zimbabwe	1:01.93	NR
60	5	0	Santiago Cavanagh	Bolivia	1:01.99	NR
61	3	4	Rafael Alfaro	El Salvador	1:02.02	NR
62	3	6	Marc Rojas	Dominican Republic	1:02.18	
63	5	2	Arya Nasimi Shad	Iran	1:02.21	NR
64	4	4	Wong Chun Yan	Hong Kong	1:02.35	
65	4	1	Arnoldo Herrera	Costa Rica	1:02.39	NR
66	4	6	Denis Petrashov	Kyrgyzstan	1:02.66	
67	4	8	Darren Chan Chin Wah	Mauritius	1:02.93	NR
68	4	2	Fausto Huerta	Dominican Republic	1:03.08	
69	4	9	Ryan Maskelyne	Papua New Guinea	1:03.20	NR
70	4	7	Alex Axiotis	Zambia	1:03.50	NR
71	3	5	Pedro Pinotes	Angola	1:03.65	NR
72	2	6	Alberto Batungbacal	Philippines	1:03.76	
73	3	2	Christopher Cheong	Singapore	1:04.03	
74	3	3	Jose Solis Rosales	Costa Rica	1:04.54	
75	3	7	Ashley Seeto	Papua New Guinea	1:04.84	
76	1	0	Muis Ahmad	Brunei	1:04.86	NR
77	3	1	Zandanbal Gunsennorov	Mongolia	1:05.12	NR
78	2	3	Adrian Hoek	Curaçao	1:05.39	NR
79	3	8	Deni Baholli	Albania	1:05.50	NR
80	4	0	Michael Stafrace	Malta	1:05.56	
81	4	5	Damjan Petrovski	Macedonia	1:06.14	
82	2	4	Markos Kalopsidiotis	Cyprus	1:06.21	
83	2	2	Marco Flores	Honduras	1:06.40	
84	2	7	Samuele Rossi	Seychelles	1:06.44	NR
85	3	0	Miguel Mena	Nicaragua	1:06.54	NR
86	2	5	Rainier Rafaela	Curaçao	1:07.21	
87	2	0	Meriton Veliu	Kosovo	1:10.67	NR
88	1	4	Shuvam Shrestha	Nepal	1:11.59	NR
89	2	1	John Llanelo	Gibraltar	1:11.84	
90	1	5	Josue Portillo	Honduras	1:12.38	
91	1	6	Adil Bharmal	Tanzania	1:13.84	NR
92	2	8	Devin Boodha	Saint Lucia	1:15.73	
93	1	3	Christian Villacrusis	Northern Mariana Islands	1:16.11	
94	1	2	Alassane Seydou Lancina	Niger	1:16.30	NR
95	1	7	Salofi Welch	Northern Mariana Islands	1:16.55	
96	1	1	Michael Swift	Malawi	1:22.18	NR
97	1	8	Jegan Jobe	Gambia	1:26.02	NR
	2	9	Joshua Tibatemwa	Uganda		DNS
	3	9	Omiros Zagkas	Cyprus		DSQ
	7	7	Johannes Dietrich	Austria		DSQ

=== Semifinals ===
The semifinals were held at 19:34.

==== Semifinal 1 ====
Rank	Lane	Name	Nationality	Time	Notes
1	3	Felipe França Silva	Brazil	56.99	Q
2	6	Vladimir Morozov	Russia	57.00	Q
3	7	Nic Fink	United States	57.10	Q
4	4	Ilya Shymanovich	Belarus	57.65	Q
5	1	Andrew Willis	Great Britain	57.84	
6	5	Yan Zibei	China	58.01	
7	2	Carlos Claverie	Venezuela	58.22	
8	8	Giedrius Titenis	Lithuania	58.36	

==== Semifinal 2 ====
Rank	Lane	Name	Nationality	Time	Notes
1	4	Marco Koch	Germany	56.86	Q
2	5	Cody Miller	United States	57.14	Q
3	6	Fabio Scozzoli	Italy	57.22	Q
4	7	Oleg Kostin	Russia	57.52	Q
5	2	Cameron van der Burgh	South Africa	57.67	
6	3	Felipe Lima	Brazil	57.71	
7	1	Ross Murdoch	Great Britain	57.77	
8	8	Yoshiki Yamanaka	Japan	58.17	

=== Final ===
The final was held at 18:58.

Rank	Lane	Name	Nationality	Time	Notes
1st place, gold medalist(s)	4	Marco Koch	Germany	56.77	
2nd place, silver medalist(s)	3	Vladimir Morozov	Russia	57.00	
3rd place, bronze medalist(s)	7	Fabio Scozzoli	Italy	57.04	
4	5	Felipe França Silva	Brazil	57.05	
5	1	Oleg Kostin	Russia	57.07	
6	2	Cody Miller	United States	57.08	
7	6	Nic Fink	United States	57.22	
8	8	Ilya Shymanovich	Belarus	57.28	NR
