= Niger at the 2016 Summer Olympics =

- IOC code: NIG
- NOC: Nigerien Olympic and National Sports Committee

in Rio de Janeiro
- Competitors: 6 in 4 sports
- Flag bearer: Abdoul Razak Issoufou
- Medals Ranked 69th: Gold 0 Silver 1 Bronze 0 Total 1

Summer Olympics appearances (overview)
- 1964; 1968; 1972; 1976–1980; 1984; 1988; 1992; 1996; 2000; 2004; 2008; 2012; 2016; 2020; 2024

Niger competed at the 2016 Summer Olympics in Rio de Janeiro, Brazil, from 5 to 21 August 2016. Since the nation made its debut in 1964, Nigerien athletes had participated in every edition of the Summer Olympic Games, except for two rare occasions, the 1976 Summer Olympics in Montreal, and the 1980 Summer Olympics in Moscow because of the African and the US-led boycotts, respectively.

Nigerien Olympic and National Sports Committee (French: Comité Olympique et Sportif National du Niger, COSNI) sent a team of six athletes, four men and two women, to compete in four different sports at the Olympics, matching the nation's roster size with London 2012. This was also the youngest delegation in Niger's Olympic history, with about half the team under the age of 25, and many of the team members were expected to reach their peak in time for the 2020 Summer Olympics in Tokyo. All of the Nigerien athletes made their Olympic debut in Rio de Janeiro, with six-foot-nine taekwondo fighter Abdoul Razak Issoufou leading the team as the nation's flag bearer in the opening ceremony.

Niger left Rio de Janeiro with its first ever Olympic medal of any color since the 1972 Summer Olympics in Munich. It was awarded to Issoufou in the men's heavyweight category (+80 kg).

== Medalists ==
Medal	Name	Sport	Event	Date
Silver	Abdoul Razak Issoufou	Taekwondo	Men's +80 kg	20 August

== Athletics ==
Niger has received universality slots from IAAF to send two athletes (one male and one female) to the Olympics.

Key

- Note–Ranks given for track events are within the athlete's heat only
- Q = Qualified for the next round
- q = Qualified for the next round as a fastest loser or, in field events, by position without achieving the qualifying target
- NR = National record
- N/A = Round not applicable for the event
- Bye = Athlete not required to compete in round

Track & road events

Athlete	Event	Heat		Semifinal		Final	
Athlete	Event	Result	Rank	Result	Rank	Result	Rank
Ousseini Djibo	Men's 400 m	50.06	8	Did not advance			
Mariama Mahamatou Itatou	Women's 400 m	54.32	6	Did not advance			

== Judo ==
Niger has qualified one judoka for the men's lightweight category (73 kg) at the Games. Ahmed Goumar earned a continental quota spot from the African region as Niger's top-ranked judoka outside of direct qualifying position in the IJF World Ranking List of May 30, 2016.

Athlete	Event	Round of 64	Round of 32	Round of 16	Quarterfinals	Semifinals	Repechage	Final / BM	
Athlete	Event	Opposition Result	Opposition Result	Opposition Result	Opposition Result	Opposition Result	Opposition Result	Opposition Result	Rank
Ahmed Goumar	Men's −73 kg	Bye	Delpopolo (USA); L 000–100	Did not advance					

== Swimming ==
Niger has received a Universality invitation from FINA to send two swimmers (one male and one female) to the Olympics.

Athlete	Event	Heat		Semifinal		Final	
Athlete	Event	Time	Rank	Time	Rank	Time	Rank
Albachir Mouctar	Men's 50 m freestyle	26.56 NR	70	Did not advance			
Roukaya Mahamane	Women's 50 m freestyle	35.60 NR	83	Did not advance			

== Taekwondo ==
Niger entered one athlete into the taekwondo competition at the Olympics. Abdoul Razak Issoufou secured a spot in the men's heavyweight category (+80 kg) by virtue of his top two finish at the 2016 African Qualification Tournament in Agadir, Morocco.

Athlete	Event	Round of 16	Quarterfinals	Semifinals	Repechage	Final / BM	
Athlete	Event	Opposition Result	Opposition Result	Opposition Result	Opposition Result	Opposition Result	Rank
Abdoul Razak Issoufou	Men's +80 kg	N'diaye (FRA); W 6–0	Siqueira (BRA); W 6–1	Shokin (UZB); W 8–2	Bye	Isayev (AZE); L 2–6	2nd place, silver medalist(s)
