= Rowing at the 2012 Summer Olympics – Men's single sculls =

Men's single sculls at the Games of the XXX Olympiad
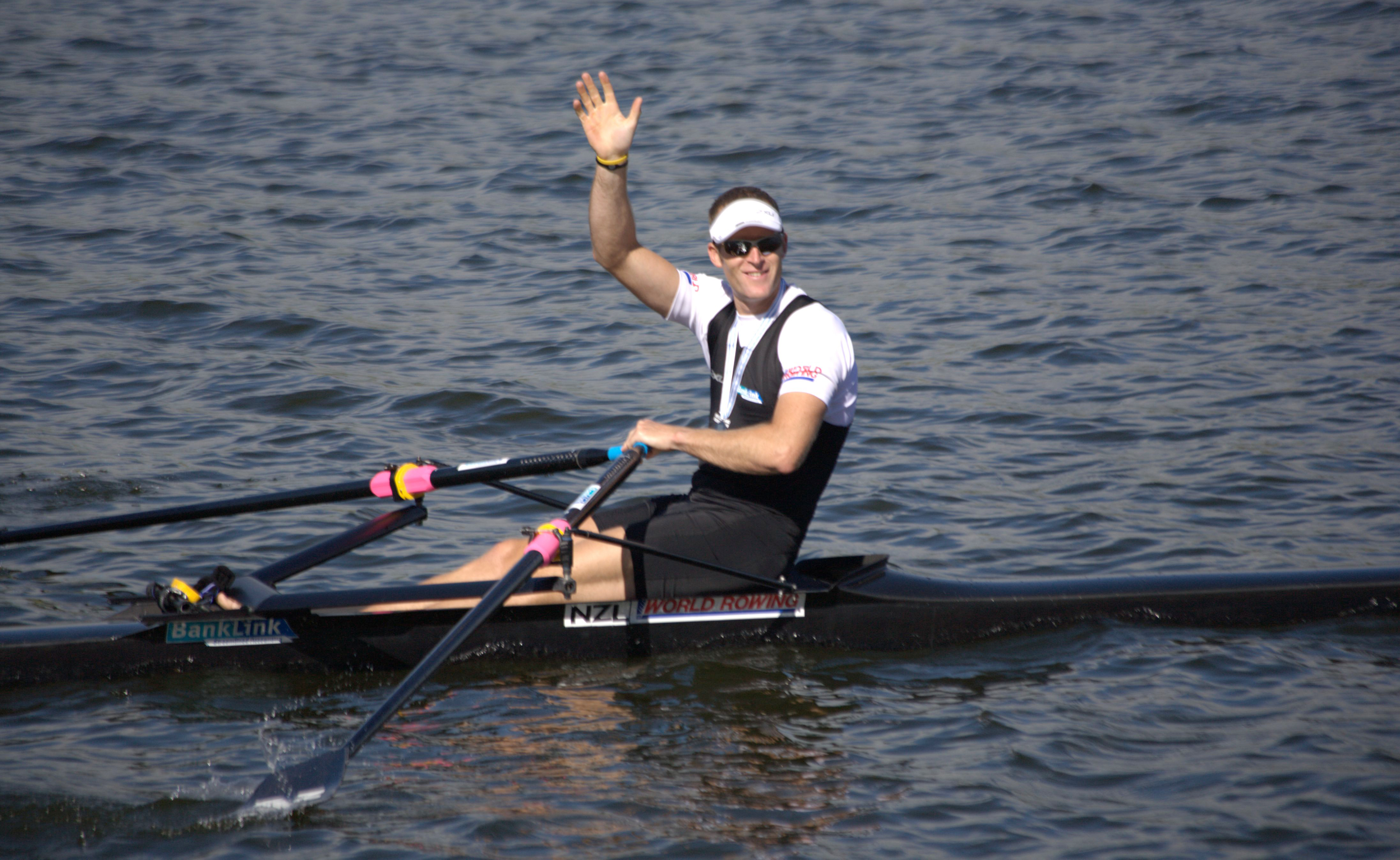
- Gold medallist Mahé Drysdale (2010)
- Venue: Eton Dorney
- Dates: 28 July – 3 August 2012
- Competitors: 33 from 33 nations
- Winning time: 6:57.82

Medalists
1st place, gold medalist(s)		Mahé Drysdale; New Zealand
2nd place, silver medalist(s)		Ondřej Synek; Czech Republic
3rd place, bronze medalist(s)		Alan Campbell; Great Britain

The men's single sculls competition at the 2012 Summer Olympics in London took place at Dorney Lake which, for the purposes of the Games venue, was officially termed Eton Dorney. It was held from 28 July to 3 August. There were 33 competitors from 33 nations. The event was won by Mahé Drysdale of New Zealand, the nation's first victory in the event since 2000. Ondřej Synek of the Czech Republic earned his second consecutive silver in the event; Drysdale and Synek were the 13th and 14th men to win multiple medals in the single sculls; they would go on to be the 5th and 6th to earn three in the event in 2016 when Drysdale repeated as champion and Synek added a bronze. The 2012 bronze went to Alan Campbell, Great Britain's first medal in the event since 1928.

== Background ==
This was the 26th appearance of the event. Rowing had been on the programme in 1896 but was cancelled due to bad weather. The single sculls has been held every time that rowing has been contested, beginning in 1900.

Nine of the 12 A/B semifinalists from the 2008 Games returned, including the top eight finishers: two-time gold medallist Olaf Tufte of Norway, silver medallist Ondřej Synek of the Czech Republic, bronze medallist Mahé Drysdale of New Zealand, fourth-place finisher (and 2004 A finalist) Tim Maeyens of Belgium, fifth-place finisher Alan Campbell of Great Britain, sixth-place finisher Lassi Karonen of Sweden, two-time seventh-place finisher (and 2000 bronze medallist) Marcel Hacker of Germany, eighth-place finisher Mindaugas Griskonis of Lithuania, and eleventh-place finisher Ken Jurkowski of the United States. Drysdale was the favourite again and hoping for better than bronze this time; he had won five of the six World Championships since the 2004 Olympics. Synek was his biggest challenger, having won the 2010 World Championship. The two-time reigning champion, Tufte, was still a strong contender though not at his peak anymore. Campbell had medaled at the last three World Championships and won the 2003, 2007, and 2011 Diamond Challenge Sculls competitions (matching Drysdale's three wins in that event at that point, though Drysdale has won three more since).

Azerbaijan, Croatia, El Salvador, Niger, and Zimbabwe each made their debut in the event. Great Britain and the United States each made their 21st appearance, tied for most among nations.

== Qualification ==
Nations had been limited to one boat (one rower) each since 1912. The 33 qualifiers were:

- 11 boats from the 2011 World Championships
- 6 boats from the Asian Qualification Regatta
- 4 boats from the African Qualification Regatta
- 6 boats from the Latin American Qualification Regatta
- 4 boats from the Final Qualification Regatta
- 2 invitational boats

== Competition format ==
This rowing event is a single scull event, meaning that each boat is propelled by a single rower. The "scull" portion means that the rower uses two oars, one on each side of the boat; this contrasts with sweep rowing in which each rower has one oar and rows on only one side (not feasible for singles events). The competition consists of multiple rounds. The competition expanded to five rounds, keeping the preliminary heats round added in 2008 and restoring the repechage after the first round. Finals were held to determine the placing of each boat; these finals were given letters with those nearer to the beginning of the alphabet meaning a better ranking. Semifinals were named based on which finals they fed, with each semifinal having two possible finals. The course used the 2000 metres distance that became the Olympic standard in 1912.

During the first round six heats were held. The first three boats in each heat advanced to the quarterfinals, while all others were relegated to the repechages.

The repechage was a round which offered rowers a second chance to qualify for the quarterfinals. Placing in the repechage heats determined which quarterfinal the boat would race in. The top two boats in each repechage heat moved on to the quarterfinals, with the remaining boats going to the E/F semifinals.

The quarterfinals were the second round for rowers still competing for medals. Placing in the quarterfinal heats determined which semifinal the boat would race in. The top three boats in each quarterfinal moved on to the A/B semifinals, with the bottom three boats going to the C/D semifinals.

Six semifinals were held, two each of A/B semifinals, C/D semifinals, and E/F semifinals. For each semifinal race, the top three boats moved on to the better of the two finals, while the bottom three boats went to the lesser of the two finals possible. For example, a second-place finish in an A/B semifinal would result in advancement to the A final.

The fourth and final round was the finals. Each final determined a set of rankings. The A final determined the medals, along with the rest of the places through 6th. The B final gave rankings from 7th to 12th, the C from 13th to 18th, and so on. Thus, to win a medal rowers had to finish in the top three of their heat (or top two of their repechage heat), top three of their quarterfinal, and top three of their A/B semifinal to reach the A final.

== Schedule ==
All times are British Summer Time (UTC+1)

Date	Time	Round
Saturday, 28 July 2012	12:30	Heats
Sunday, 29 July 2012	9:50	Repechage
Tuesday, 31 July 2012	9:30; 10:40	Semifinals E/F; Quarterfinals
Wednesday, 1 August 2012	09:30; 11:20	Semifinals C/D; Semifinals A/B
Friday, 3 August 2012	09:30; 09:40; 09:50; 10:00; 10:40; 12:30	Final F Final E Final D Final C Final B Final A

== Results ==
=== Heats ===
The first three of each heat qualify to the quarterfinals, while the remainder went to the repechage.

==== Heat 1 ====
Rank	Rower	Nation	Time	Notes
1	Tim Maeyens	Belgium	6:42.52	Q
2	Ángel Fournier	Cuba	6:46.35	Q
3	Patrick Loliger Salas	Mexico	6:51.78	Q
4	Sawarn Singh	India	6:54.04	R
5	Óscar Vásquez	Chile	7:06.33	R
6	Mohsen Shadi	Iran	7:27.42	R

==== Heat 2 ====
Rank	Rower	Nation	Time	Notes
1	Marcel Hacker	Germany	6:43.80	Q
2	Santiago Fernández	Argentina	6:46.03	Q
3	Henrik Stephansen	Denmark	6:46.32	Q
4	Mindaugas Griskonis	Lithuania	6:46.56	R
5	Víctor Aspillaga	Peru	7:13.79	R
6	So Sau Wah	Hong Kong	7:15.91	R

==== Heat 3 ====
Rank	Rower	Nation	Time	Notes
1	Lassi Karonen	Sweden	6:45.42	Q
2	Aleksandar Aleksandrov	Azerbaijan	6:49.81	Q
3	Mathias Raymond	Monaco	6:58.60	Q
4	Anderson Nocetti	Brazil	7:03.78	R
5	James Fraser-Mackenzie	Zimbabwe	7:16.83	R
6	Paul Etia Ndoumbe	Cameroon	7:29.77	R

==== Heat 4 ====
Rank	Rower	Nation	Time	Notes
1	Mahé Drysdale	New Zealand	6:49.69	Q
2	Olaf Tufte	Norway	7:00.90	Q
3	Nour El Din Hassanein	Egypt	7:06.17	Q
4	Roberto López	El Salvador	7:23.75	R
5	Hamadou Djibo Issaka	Niger	8:25.56	R

==== Heat 5 ====
Rank	Rower	Nation	Time	Notes
1	Alan Campbell	Great Britain	6:47.62	Q
2	Zhang Liang	China	6:50.71	Q
3	Michał Słoma	Poland	6:54.58	Q
4	Kim Dong-yong	South Korea	7:05.24	R
5	Vladislav Yakovlev	Kazakhstan	7:16.34	R

==== Heat 6 ====
Rank	Rower	Nation	Time	Notes
1	Ondřej Synek	Czech Republic	6:53.23	Q
2	Mario Vekic	Croatia	7:02.63	Q
3	Kenneth Jurkowski	United States	7:08.49	Q
4	Wang Ming-hui	Chinese Taipei	7:15.77	R
5	Aymen Mejri	Tunisia	7:21.64	R

=== Repechage ===
The first two in each heat qualified for the quarterfinals; the remainder went to Semifinals E/F and were out of medal contention.

==== Repechage heat 1 ====
Rank	Rower	Nation	Time	Notes
1	Sawarn Singh	India	7:00.49	Q
2	Kim Dong-yong	South Korea	7:03.91	Q
3	Víctor Aspillaga	Peru	7:10.54	QEF
4	Aymen Mejri	Tunisia	7:11.94	QEF
5	Paul Etia Ndoumbe	Cameroon	7:24.15	QEF

==== Repechage heat 2 ====
Rank	Rower	Nation	Time	Notes
1	Mindaugas Griskonis	Lithuania	7:00.19	Q
2	Mohsen Shadi	Iran	7:11.55	Q
3	Wang Ming-hui	Chinese Taipei	7:16.84	QEF
4	James Fraser-Mackenzie	Zimbabwe	7:19.85	QEF
5	Hamadou Djibo Issaka	Niger	8:39.66	QEF

==== Repechage heat 3 ====
Rank	Rower	Nation	Time	Notes
1	Anderson Nocetti	Brazil	7:07.17	Q
2	Óscar Vásquez	Chile	7:09.12	Q
3	So Sau Wah	Hong Kong	7:13.75	QEF
4	Vladislav Yakovlev	Kazakhstan	7:22.00	QEF
5	Roberto López	El Salvador	7:27.75	QEF

=== Quarterfinals ===
The first three in each heat qualified for the A/B semifinals; the remainder went to the C/D semifinals and were out of medal contention.

==== Quarterfinal 1 ====
Rank	Rower	Nation	Time	Notes
1	Mahé Drysdale	New Zealand	6:54.86	QAB
2	Tim Maeyens	Belgium	6:56.65	QAB
3	Mindaugas Griskonis	Lithuania	7:00.80	QAB
4	Mario Vekic	Croatia	7:05.78	QCD
5	Michał Słoma	Poland	7:21.55	QCD
6	Óscar Vásquez	Chile	7:24.07	QCD

==== Quarterfinal 2 ====
Rank	Rower	Nation	Time	Notes
1	Alan Campbell	Great Britain	6:52.10	QAB
2	Marcel Hacker	Germany	6:54.18	QAB
3	Aleksandar Aleksandrov	Azerbaijan	6:56.36	QAB
4	Patrick Loliger Salas	Mexico	7:00.20	QCD
5	Kim Dong-yong	South Korea	7:16.22	QCD
6	Anderson Nocetti	Brazil	7:17.37	QCD

==== Quarterfinal 3 ====
Rank	Rower	Nation	Time	Notes
1	Lassi Karonen	Sweden	6:57.06	QAB
2	Santiago Fernández	Argentina	7:01.57	QAB
3	Zhang Liang	China	7:02.03	QAB
4	Sawarn Singh	India	7:11.59	QCD
5	Kenneth Jurkowski	United States	7:18.27	QCD
6	Nour El-Din Hassanein	Egypt	7:23.12	QCD

==== Quarterfinal 4 ====
Rank	Rower	Nation	Time	Notes
1	Ondřej Synek	Czech Republic	6:53.32	QAB
2	Ángel Fournier	Cuba	6:54.12	QAB
3	Olaf Tufte	Norway	6:55.36	QAB
4	Henrik Stephansen	Denmark	6:55.95	QCD
5	Mathias Raymond	Monaco	7:20.16	QCD
6	Mohsen Shadi	Iran	7:32.72	QCD

=== Semifinals ===
The first three in each semifinal advanced to the better of the two finals available (E, C, A) while the remaining boats went to the other final (F, D, B).

==== Semifinal E/F 1 ====
Rank	Rower	Nation	Time	Notes
1	So Sau Wah	Hong Kong	7:44.20	QF
2	Víctor Aspillaga	Peru	7:53.76	QF
3	Roberto López	El Salvador	7:57.89	QF
4	Hamadou Djibo Issaka	Niger	9:07.99	QF

==== Semifinal E/F 2 ====
Rank	Rower	Nation	Time	Notes
1	Wang Ming-hui	Chinese Taipei	7:33.18	QF
2	Vladislav Yakovlev	Kazakhstan	7:33.29	QF
3	James Fraser-Mackenzie	Zimbabwe	7:33.81	QE
4	Paul Etia Ndoumbe	Cameroon	7:35.48	QF
5	Aymen Mejri	Tunisia	7:58.48	QF

==== Semifinal C/D 1 ====
Rank	Rower	Nation	Time	Notes
1	Mario Vekic	Croatia	7:33.51	QC
2	Sawarn Singh	India	7:36.25	QC
3	Mathias Raymond	Monaco	7:38.17	QC
4	Kim Dong-yong	South Korea	7:48.09	QD
5	Óscar Vásquez	Chile	7:57.36	QD
6	Mohsen Shadi	Iran	8:20.29	QD

==== Semifinal C/D 2 ====
Rank	Rower	Nation	Time	Notes
1	Henrik Stephansen	Denmark	7:29.76	QC
2	Patrick Loliger Salas	Mexico	7:29.82	QC
3	Michał Słoma	Poland	7:39.00	QC
4	Nour El-Din Hassanein	Egypt	7:44.53	QD
5	Anderson Nocetti	Brazil	7:54.18	QD
6	Kenneth Jurkowski	United States	7:56.51	QD

==== Semifinal A/B 1 ====
Rank	Rower	Nation	Time	Notes
1	Mahé Drysdale	New Zealand	7:18.11	QA
2	Lassi Karonen	Sweden	7:19.77	QA
3	Marcel Hacker	Germany	7:22.07	QA
4	Ángel Fournier	Cuba	7:30.19	QB
5	Mindaugas Griskonis	Lithuania	7:31.72	QB
6	Olaf Tufte	Norway	7:35.31	QB

==== Semifinal A/B 2 ====
Rank	Rower	Nation	Time	Notes
1	Ondřej Synek	Czech Republic	7:16.58	QA
2	Alan Campbell	Great Britain	7:18.92	QA
3	Aleksandar Aleksandrov	Azerbaijan	7:20.80	QA
4	Santiago Fernández	Argentina	7:29.68	QB
5	Zhang Liang	China	7:31.52	QB
6	Tim Maeyens	Belgium	7:39.78	QB

=== Finals ===
==== Final F ====
Rank	Rower	Nation	Time
31	Aymen Mejri	Tunisia	7:33.62
32	Paul Etia Ndoumbe	Cameroon	7:46.23
33	Hamadou Djibo Issaka	Niger	8:53.88

==== Final E ====
Rank	Rower	Nation	Time
25	So Sau Wah	Hong Kong	7:29.35
26	Wang Ming-hui	Chinese Taipei	7:33.28
27	Víctor Aspillaga	Peru	7:35.88
28	Vladislav Yakovlev	Kazakhstan	7:36.14
29	Roberto López	El Salvador	7:41.32
30	James Fraser-Mackenzie	Zimbabwe	7:46.49

==== Final D ====
Rank	Rower	Nation	Time
19	Anderson Nocetti	Brazil	7:25.03
20	Nour El-Din Hassanein	Egypt	7:27.19
21	Kim Dong-yong	South Korea	7:27.94
22	Mohsen Shadi	Iran	7:31.42
23	Óscar Vásquez	Chile	7:36.79
—	Kenneth Jurkowski	United States	DNS

==== Final C ====
Rank	Rower	Nation	Time
13	Henrik Stephansen	Denmark	7:19.62
14	Patrick Loliger Salas	Mexico	7:20.10
15	Mario Vekic	Croatia	7:27.60
16	Sawarn Singh	India	7:29.66
17	Michał Słoma	Poland	7:34.98
18	Mathias Raymond	Monaco	7:36.35

==== Final B ====
Rank	Rower	Nation	Time
7	Ángel Fournier	Cuba	7:11.17
8	Mindaugas Griškonis	Lithuania	7:15.32
9	Olaf Tufte	Norway	7:18.15
10	Santiago Fernández	Argentina	7:20.40
11	Zhang Liang	China	7:25.64
12	Tim Maeyens	Belgium	7:27.51

==== Final A ====
Rank	Rower	Nation	Time
1st place, gold medalist(s)	Mahé Drysdale	New Zealand	6:57.82
2nd place, silver medalist(s)	Ondřej Synek	Czech Republic	6:59.37
3rd place, bronze medalist(s)	Alan Campbell	Great Britain	7:03.28
4	Lassi Karonen	Sweden	7:04.04
5	Aleksandar Aleksandrov	Azerbaijan	7:09.42
6	Marcel Hacker	Germany	7:10.21
