= Niger at the 2012 Summer Paralympics =

- IPC code: NIG
- NPC: Fédération Nigérienne des Sports Paralympiques

in London
- Competitors: 2 in 1 sport
- Medals: Gold 0 Silver 0 Bronze 0 Total 0

Summer Paralympics appearances (overview)
- 2004; 2008; 2012; 2016; 2020; 2024

Niger competed at the 2012 Summer Paralympics in London, United Kingdom from August 29 to September 9, 2012.

== Athletics ==
Men's track

Athlete	Event	Heat		Final	
Athlete	Event	Result	Rank	Result	Rank
Ibrahim Mamoudou Tamangue	100m T46	12.29	7	did not advance	

Women's field

Athlete	Event	Distance	Rank
Kadidjatou Amadou	Javelin Throw F54-56	11.63	12

== See also ==
- Niger at the Paralympics
- Niger at the 2012 Summer Olympics
