= Niger at the 2017 World Aquatics Championships =

- Flag of Niger
- FINA code: NIG
- National federation: Federation Nigerienne des Sport Nautiques

in Budapest, Hungary
- Competitors: 3 in 1 sport
- Medals: Gold 0 Silver 0 Bronze 0 Total 0

World Aquatics Championships appearances
- 1973; 1975; 1978; 1982; 1986; 1991; 1994; 1998; 2001; 2003; 2005; 2007; 2009; 2011; 2013; 2015; 2017; 2019; 2022; 2023; 2024

Niger competed at the 2017 World Aquatics Championships in Budapest, Hungary from 14 July to 30 July.

== Swimming ==
Niger has received a Universality invitation from FINA to send three swimmers (two men and one woman) to the World Championships.

Athlete	Event	Heat		Semifinal		Final	
Athlete	Event	Time	Rank	Time	Rank	Time	Rank
Alassane Lancina	Men's 50 m breaststroke	35.00	74	did not advance			
Alassane Lancina	Men's 100 m breaststroke	1:22.54	73	did not advance			
Albachir Mouctar	Men's 50 m freestyle	26.75	109	did not advance			
Albachir Mouctar	Men's 50 m butterfly	29.63	76	did not advance			
Roukaya Mahamane	Women's 50 m freestyle	35.77	85	did not advance			
Roukaya Mahamane	Women's 50 m breaststroke	46.49	50	did not advance			
