= Niger at the 2008 Summer Olympics =

- IOC code: NIG
- NOC: Nigerien Olympic and National Sports Committee

in Beijing
- Competitors: 5 in 3 sports
- Flag bearer: Mohamed Alhousseini Alhassan
- Officials: Guéro Amadou (COSNI)
- Medals: Gold 0 Silver 0 Bronze 0 Total 0

Summer Olympics appearances (overview)
- 1964; 1968; 1972; 1976–1980; 1984; 1988; 1992; 1996; 2000; 2004; 2008; 2012; 2016; 2020; 2024; 2028

Niger sent five athletes, their second largest contingent ever (6 in 1988), equalling the most sports in which they have participated (3 in 2004). to compete at the 2008 Summer Olympics in Beijing, China. It was Niger's 10th Olympics; their only medalist has been Issaka Dabore, in boxing, at the 1972 games.

== Delegation ==
For 2008, the Nigerien delegation included Lailatou Amadou Lele competing in Taekwondo, Mohamed Lamine Alhousseini Alhassan in Men's 50 metre freestyle, and Mariama Souley Bana in Women's 50 metre freestyle, with the rest of the Nigerien athletes competing in athletics in 400 metres and 1500 metres competitions. The delegation also included Abdramane Seydou, the Minister of Sport, other ministerial officials, one journalist and members of the Niger Olympic Committee (COSNI), including Guéro Amadou, its president.

== Athletics ==
Key

- Note–Ranks given for track events are within the athlete's heat only
- Q = Qualified for the next round
- q = Qualified for the next round as a fastest loser or, in field events, by position without achieving the qualifying target
- NR = National record
- N/A = Round not applicable for the event
- Bye = Athlete not required to compete in round

Men

Harouna Garba competed on Niger's behalf at the Beijing Olympics in the men's 400 meters hurdles. He was born in 1986, and was 22 years old at the time of his participation in his Beijing event. Garba had not previously competed at any Olympic games. During the qualification round of Garba's event, which took place on August 15, the Nigerien athlete was placed in the first heat against six other competitors. Garba finished the event in 55.14 seconds, placing last out of seven, and was directly behind Portugal's Edivaldo Monteiro (49.89 seconds) and Japan's Kenji Narisako (49.63 seconds) in a heat led by Bershawn Jackson of the United States (49.20 seconds) and Pieter de Villiers of South Africa (49.24 seconds). Of the 25 athletes completing the event, Garba ranked last. He did not advance to later rounds.

Athlete	Event	Heat		Semifinal		Final	
Athlete	Event	Result	Rank	Result	Rank	Result	Rank
Harouna Garba	400 m hurdles	55.14	7	Did not advance			

Women

Rachidatou Seini Maikido's 1:03.19 time bested what had been Salamtou Hassane's national record time of 1:03.28 in the 2004 Olympics Women's 400 metres.

Rachidatou Seini Maikido competed as Niger's only female track athlete at the Beijing Olympics. Born in 1988, Maikido was 19 years old at the time of her participation in the women's 400 meters races. Maikido had not previously competed at any Olympic event or games. On August 16, the Nigerien athlete was placed in the third heat of the qualification round against six other athletes. She finished the event in 1:03.19, finishing last behind Haitian runner Ginou Etienne (53.94 seconds) and Puerto Rican athlete Carol Rodriguez (53.94 seconds) in a heat led by Russian Anastasiya Kapachinskaya (51.32 seconds) and the American Mary Wineberg (51.46 seconds). Of the 50 athletes who competed in the round, Maikido ranked in 49th place. She and last place finalist Ghada Ali of Libya were the only athletes in the round to not break one minute. Maikido did not advance to later rounds.

Athlete	Event	Heat		Semifinal		Final	
Athlete	Event	Result	Rank	Result	Rank	Result	Rank
Rachidatou Seini Maikido	400 m	1:03.19 NR	7	Did not advance			

== Swimming ==
Mohamed Alhousseini Alhassan competed at the Beijing Olympics in the men's 50 meters freestyle as the only male Nigerien swimmer at the Games that year. Born in 1978, Alhousseini was 30 years old at the time of his event at the Olympics. The Nigerien had not previously competed at any Olympic games. The event in which Alhousseini competed hosted its preliminary round on August 14. Placed in the second heat against five other athletes, Alhousseini finished in fourth place after completing the event in 30.90 seconds. The Nigerien ranked ahead of Antigua and Barbuda's Kareem Valentine (31.23 seconds) and behind Yemen's Abdulsalam Al Gadabi (30.63 seconds) in a heat led by Laotian swimmer Thepphithak Chindavong (29.31 seconds) and Burkinabé athlete Rene Jacob Yougbara (30.08 seconds). Of the 97 athletes competing in the event's preliminary round, Alhousseini finished in 95th place. He did not advance to later rounds.

Mariama Souley Bana competed at the Beijing Olympics as the only Nigerien female swimmer in the competition. She competed in the women's 50 meters freestyle event. Born in Niger in 1987, Bana was 21 years old when she competed at the Olympic games in Beijing. She had not previously competed in any Olympic games or events. Her event's preliminary round took place on August 15, and she competed in the second heat against seven other athletes. Bana ranked last in the heat with a time of 40.83 seconds, placing behind Burundian Elsie Uwamahoro (36.86 seconds) in seventh and Burkina Faso's Elisabeth Nikiema (34.98 seconds) in sixth. The heat was led by Zakia Nassar of Palestine (31.97 seconds) and Karishma Karki of Nepal (32.35 seconds). Of the 90 athletes who finished the event's preliminary round, Bana ranked last. She did not advance to later rounds.

Men

Athlete	Event	Heat		Semifinal		Final	
Athlete	Event	Time	Rank	Time	Rank	Time	Rank
Mohamed Alhousseini Alhassan	50 m freestyle	30.90	95	Did not advance			

Women

Athlete	Event	Heat		Semifinal		Final	
Athlete	Event	Time	Rank	Time	Rank	Time	Rank
Mariama Souley Bana	50 m freestyle	40.83	90	Did not advance			

== Taekwondo ==
Athlete	Event	Round of 16	Quarterfinals	Semifinals	Repechage	Bronze Medal	Final	
Athlete	Event	Opposition Result	Opposition Result	Opposition Result	Opposition Result	Opposition Result	Opposition Result	Rank
Lailatou Amadou Lele	Women's −57 kg	Nunes (BRA); L DSQ	Did not advance					
