= Niger at the 1996 Summer Olympics =

- IOC code: NIG
- NOC: Nigerien Olympic and National Sports Committee

in Atlanta
- Competitors: 3 in 1 sport
- Flag bearer: Abdou Manzo
- Medals: Gold 0 Silver 0 Bronze 0 Total 0

Summer Olympics appearances (overview)
- 1964; 1968; 1972; 1976–1980; 1984; 1988; 1992; 1996; 2000; 2004; 2008; 2012; 2016; 2020; 2024

Niger competed at the 1996 Summer Olympics in Atlanta, United States.

== Competitors ==
The following is the list of number of competitors in the Games.

| Sport | Men | Women | Total |
|---|---|---|---|
| Athletics | 2 | 1 | 3 |
| Total | 2 | 1 | 3 |

== Athletics ==
=== Men ===
Track and road events

| Athletes | Events | Heat Round 1 | | Heat Round 2 | | Semifinal | | Final | |
| Athletes | Events | Time | Rank | Time | Rank | Time | Rank | Time | Rank |
|---|---|---|---|---|---|---|---|---|---|
| Boureima Kimba | 100 metres | 11.24 | 101 | did not advance | | | | | |
| Abdou Manzo | Marathon | N/A | | | | | | 2:30:57 | 85 |

=== Women ===
Track and road events

| Athletes | Events | Heat Round 1 | | Heat Round 2 | | Semifinal | | Final | |
| Athletes | Events | Time | Rank | Time | Rank | Time | Rank | Time | Rank |
|---|---|---|---|---|---|---|---|---|---|
| Rachida Mahamane | 5000 metres | 19:17.87 | 46 | N/A | | | | did not advance | |
