= Abdou Alassane Dji Bo =

Nigerien judoka (born 1979)

Personal information
- Born: 15 June 1979 (age 46)
- Occupation: Judoka

Sport
- Sport: Judo

Profile at external databases
- JudoInside.com: 36793

Abdou Alassane Dji Bo (born 15 June 1979) is a Nigerien judoka. He is a three-time medallist at the African Judo Championships.

He competed at the 2004 Summer Olympics and was Niger's first-ever Olympic judoka, having learned the sport with an Olympic scholarship.

He was a bronze medal in the half lightweight category at the 2006 African Judo Championships.

== International competitions ==
Year	Tournament	Result	Weight class
2006	African Judo Championships	3rd	Half lightweight (66 kg)
2005	African Judo Championships	2nd	Half lightweight (66 kg)
2004	African Judo Championships	3rd	Half lightweight (66 kg)

Olympic Games
Preceded by Mamane S Ani Ali	Flagbearer for Niger; Athens 2004	Succeeded by Mohamed Alhousseini Alhassan
