= Peru at the 2012 Summer Olympics =

- IOC code: PER
- NOC: Peruvian Olympic Committee
- Website: www.coperu.org (in Spanish)

in London
- Competitors: 16 in 9 sports
- Flag bearers: Gladys Tejeda (opening); Inés Melchor (closing)
- Medals Ranked 80th: Gold 0 Silver 0 Bronze 0 Total 0

Summer Olympics appearances (overview)
- 1900; 1904–1932; 1936; 1948; 1952; 1956; 1960; 1964; 1968; 1972; 1976; 1980; 1984; 1988; 1992; 1996; 2000; 2004; 2008; 2012; 2016; 2020; 2024

Peru competed at the 2012 Summer Olympics in London, from 27 July to 12 August 2012. This was the nation's seventeenth appearance at the Olympics, having only missed the 1952 Summer Olympics in Helsinki.

The Comité Olímpico Peruano sent a total of 16 athletes, 9 men and 7 women, to compete in 9 sports, tying its record with Barcelona in 1992. Three athletes had competed in Beijing, including taekwondo jin Peter López, who narrowly missed out on a medal in Beijing in the bronze medal match. Marathon runner Gladys Tejeda, who competed at her first Olympics, became the nation's first female flag bearer at the opening ceremony since 2000. Peru, however, failed to win a single Olympic medal, continuing a drought that began at the 1992 Summer Olympics in Barcelona, where Juan Giha won the silver for skeet shooting.

== Athletics ==
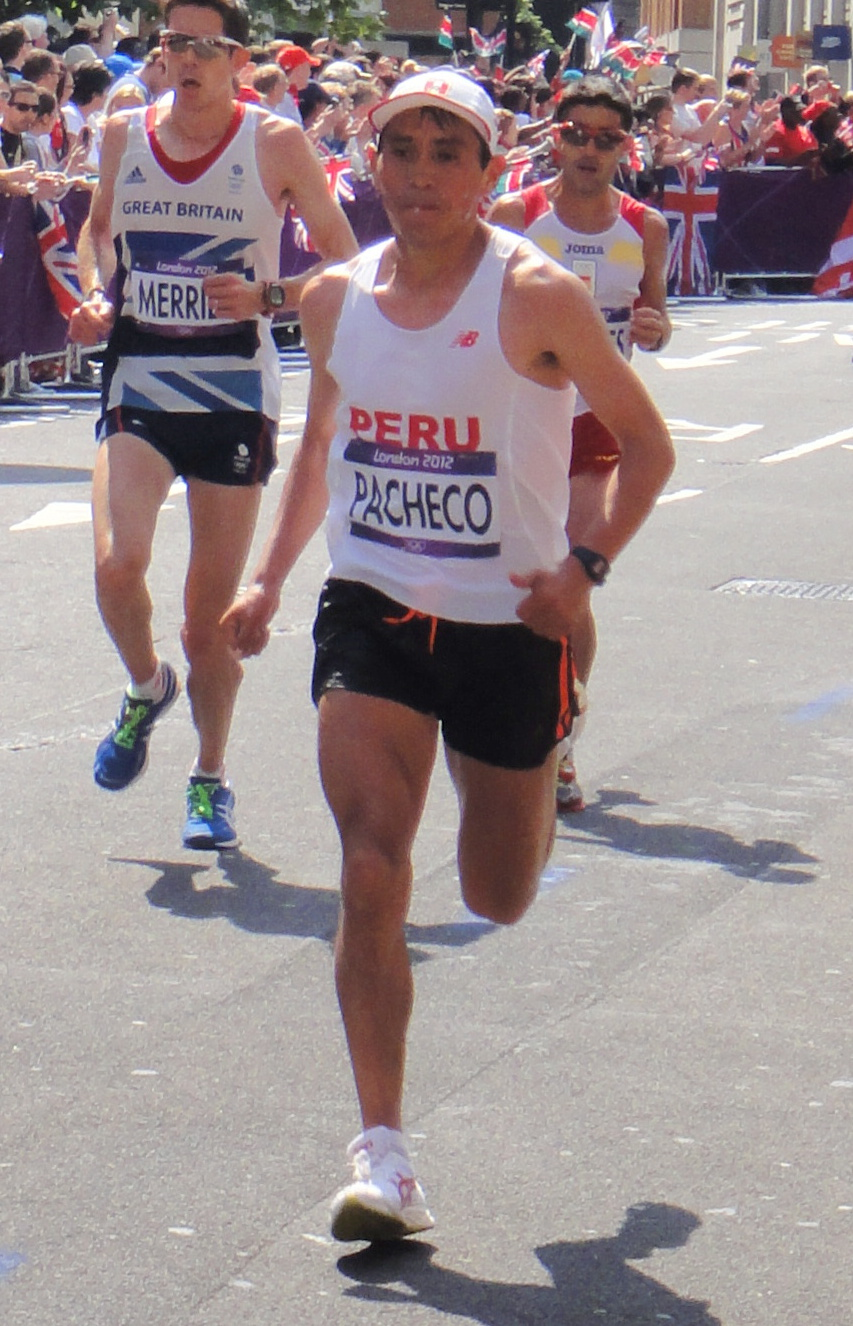
Raúl Pacheco finished twenty-first in men's marathon.

Peruvian athletes have so far achieved qualifying standards in the following athletics events (up to a maximum of 3 athletes in each event at the 'A' Standard, and 1 at the 'B' Standard):

Key

- Note – Ranks given for track events are within the athlete's heat only
- Q = Qualified for the next round
- q = Qualified for the next round as a fastest loser or, in field events, by position without achieving the qualifying target
- NR = National record
- N/A = Round not applicable for the event
- Bye = Athlete not required to compete in round

Men

| Athlete | Event | Heat | | Final | |
| Athlete | Event | Result | Rank | Result | Rank |
|---|---|---|---|---|---|
| Mario Bazán | 3000 m steeplechase | 8:51.95 | 11 | Did not advance | |
| Raúl Pacheco | Marathon | —N/a | | 2:15:35 | 21 |

Women

| Athlete | Event | Final | |
| Athlete | Event | Result | Rank |
|---|---|---|---|
| Wilma Arizapana | Marathon | 2:35:09 | 55 |
| Inés Melchor | Marathon | 2:28:54 | 25 |
| Gladys Tejeda | Marathon | 2:32:07 | 43 |

== Badminton ==
| Athlete | Event | Group Stage | | | Elimination | Quarterfinal | Semifinal | Final / BM | |
| Athlete | Event | Opposition Score | Opposition Score | Rank | Opposition Score | Opposition Score | Opposition Score | Opposition Score | Rank |
|---|---|---|---|---|---|---|---|---|---|
| Rodrigo Pacheco | Men's singles | Lee H-i (KOR); L 12–21, 7–21 | —N/a | 2 | Did not advance | | | | |
| Claudia Rivero | Women's singles | Li Xr (CHN); L 5–21, 6–21 | Marín (ESP); L 17–21, 7–21 | 3 | Did not advance | | | | |

== Judo ==
Peru has qualified 1 judoka

| Athlete | Event | Round of 64 | Round of 32 | Round of 16 | Quarterfinals | Semifinals | Repechage | Final / BM | |
| Athlete | Event | Opposition Result | Opposition Result | Opposition Result | Opposition Result | Opposition Result | Opposition Result | Opposition Result | Rank |
|---|---|---|---|---|---|---|---|---|---|
| Juan Postigos | Men's −60 kg | Verde (ITA); L 0001–1000 | Did not advance | | | | | | |

== Rowing ==
Peru has qualified the following boat.

Men

| Athlete | Event | Heats | | Repechage | | Quarterfinals | | Semifinals | | Final | |
| Athlete | Event | Time | Rank | Time | Rank | Time | Rank | Time | Rank | Time | Rank |
|---|---|---|---|---|---|---|---|---|---|---|---|
| Víctor Aspíllaga | Single sculls | 7:13.79 | 5 R | 7:10.54 | 3 SE/F | Bye | | 7:53.76 | 2 FE | 7:35.88 | 27 |

Qualification Legend: FA=Final A (medal); FB=Final B (non-medal); FC=Final C (non-medal); FD=Final D (non-medal); FE=Final E (non-medal); FF=Final F (non-medal); SA/B=Semifinals A/B; SC/D=Semifinals C/D; SE/F=Semifinals E/F; Q=Quarterfinals; R=Repechage

== Sailing ==
Peru has qualified 1 boat for each of the following events

Women

| Athlete | Event | Race | | | | | | | | | | | Net points | Final rank |
| Athlete | Event | 1 | 2 | 3 | 4 | 5 | 6 | 7 | 8 | 9 | 10 | M* | Net points | Final rank |
|---|---|---|---|---|---|---|---|---|---|---|---|---|---|---|
| Paloma Schmidt | Laser Radial | 35 | 30 | 36 | 36 | 30 | 39 | 33 | ~~41~~ | 32 | 32 | EL | 310 | 39 |

M = Medal race; EL = Eliminated – did not advance into the medal race;

== Shooting ==
Men

| Athlete | Event | Qualification | | Final | |
| Athlete | Event | Points | Rank | Points | Rank |
|---|---|---|---|---|---|
| Nicolás Pacheco | Skeet | 109 | 32 | Did not advance | |

== Swimming ==
Peru qualified one athlete and has gained two "Universality places" from the FINA.

Men

| Athlete | Event | Heat | | Semifinal | | Final | |
| Athlete | Event | Time | Rank | Time | Rank | Time | Rank |
|---|---|---|---|---|---|---|---|
| Mauricio Fiol Villanueva | 200 m butterfly | 1:59.02 | 25 | Did not advance | | | |
| Sebastián Jahnsen | 200 m freestyle | 1:52.36 | 34 | Did not advance | | | |

Women

| Athlete | Event | Heat | | Final | |
| Athlete | Event | Time | Rank | Time | Rank |
|---|---|---|---|---|---|
| Andrea Cedrón | 400 m freestyle | 4:24.18 | 33 | Did not advance | |

== Taekwondo ==
Peru has qualified one man.

| Athlete | Event | Round of 16 | Quarterfinals | Semifinals | Repechage | Bronze Medal | Final | |
| Athlete | Event | Opposition Result | Opposition Result | Opposition Result | Opposition Result | Opposition Result | Opposition Result | Rank |
|---|---|---|---|---|---|---|---|---|
| Peter López | Men's −68 kg | Fejzić (SRB); L 3–5 | Did not advance | | | | | |

== Weightlifting ==
Peru has qualified 1 athlete.

| Athlete | Event | Snatch | | Clean & Jerk | | Total | Rank |
| Athlete | Event | Result | Rank | Result | Rank | Total | Rank |
|---|---|---|---|---|---|---|---|
| Silvana Saldarriaga | Women's −63 kg | 75 | 10 | 97 | 9 | 172 | 10 |
