= Niger at the 2019 World Aquatics Championships =

- Flag of Niger
- FINA code: NIG
- National federation: Fédération Nigérienne des Sports Nautiques

in Gwangju, South Korea
- Competitors: 3 in 1 sport
- Medals: Gold 0 Silver 0 Bronze 0 Total 0

World Aquatics Championships appearances
- 1973; 1975; 1978; 1982; 1986; 1991; 1994; 1998; 2001; 2003; 2005; 2007; 2009; 2011; 2013; 2015; 2017; 2019; 2022; 2023; 2024

Niger competed at the 2019 World Aquatics Championships in Gwangju, South Korea from 12 to 28 July.

== Swimming ==
Niger entered three swimmers.

Men

Athlete	Event	Heat		Semifinal		Final	
Athlete	Event	Time	Rank	Time	Rank	Time	Rank
Albachir Mouctar	100 m freestyle	1:00.15	112	did not advance			
Albachir Mouctar	50 m butterfly	29.45	83	did not advance			
Alassane Seydou	50 m freestyle	25.33	=99	did not advance			
Alassane Seydou	50 m backstroke	30.01	66	did not advance			

Women

Athlete	Event	Heat		Semifinal		Final	
Athlete	Event	Time	Rank	Time	Rank	Time	Rank
Roukaya Mahamane	50 m freestyle	33.71	94	did not advance			
Roukaya Mahamane	100 m freestyle	1:21.51	92	did not advance			
