= Niger at the Paralympics =

- IPC code: NIG
- NPC: Fédération Nigérienne des Sports Paralympiques
- Medals: Gold 0 Silver 0 Bronze 0 Total 0

Summer appearances
- 2004; 2008; 2012; 2016; 2020; 2024

Niger made its Paralympic Games début at the 2004 Summer Paralympics in Athens. It was represented by a single athlete, male sprinter Zoubeirou Issaka, who competed in the 100m race, in the T12 category for the nearly blind. His time of 13.90 was the slowest overall in the heats, ending his participation in the Games.

In 2008, Niger was represented only by male powerlifter Zakari Amadou, in the up to 67.5 kg category. He lifted 110 kg, ranking 13th and last of those who successfully lifted a weight.

Niger has never taken part in the Winter Paralympics.

Niger took part in the 2012 Summer Paralympics, and the Fédération Nigérienne des Sports Paralympiques chose Bedford as the UK training base for its Paralympians.

== Full results for Niger at the Paralympics ==
Name	Games	Sport	Event	Score	Rank
Zoubeirou Issaka	2004 Athens	Athletics	Men's 100m T12	13.90	4th in heat 5; did not advance
Zakari Amadou	2008 Beijing	Powerlifting	Men's Up To 67.5 kg	110 kg	13th
Ibrahim Mamoudou Tamangue	2012 London	Athletics	Men's 100m T46	12.29	7th in heat 3; did not advance
Kadidjatou Amadou	2012 London	Athletics	Women's Javelin Throw F54-56	11.63	12th
Ibrahim Dayabou	2016 Rio	Athletics	Men's 100m T45-47	11.90	6th in heat 2; did not advance
Ibrahim Dayabou	2016 Rio	Athletics	Men's Long Jump F45-47	5.43	15th
Balkissa Mamadou Amadou	2016 Rio	Athletics	Women's Discus Throw F56-57	13.25	11th
Ibrahim Dayabou	2020 Tokyo	Athletics	Men's 100m T47	12.41	7th in heat 2; did not advance
Abdou Fati Hamidou	2020 Tokyo	Athletics	Women's Shot put F57	5.76	15th
Ide Oumarrou Djabirou	2024 Paris	Taekwondo	Men's –58 kg	First round	

== See also ==
- Niger at the Olympics
