= Nafissa =

Nafissa is a given name. Notable people with the name include:

- Nafissa Sid Cara (1910-2002), French politician
- Nafissa Souleymane (born 1992), Nigerien sprinter
- Nafissa Thompson-Spires (born 1983), American writer
