= Niger at the 1988 Summer Olympics =

- IOC code: NIG
- NOC: Nigerien Olympic and National Sports Committee

in Seoul
- Competitors: 6 in 2 sports
- Flag bearer: Hassan Karimou
- Medals: Gold 0 Silver 0 Bronze 0 Total 0

Summer Olympics appearances (overview)
- 1964; 1968; 1972; 1976–1980; 1984; 1988; 1992; 1996; 2000; 2004; 2008; 2012; 2016; 2020; 2024

Niger competed at the 1988 Summer Olympics in Seoul, South Korea.

== Competitors ==
The following is the list of number of competitors in the Games.

Sport	Men	Women	Total
Athletics	3	0	3
Boxing	3	–	3
Total	6	0	6

== Athletics ==
Men
Track & road events

Athlete	Event	Heat		Quarterfinal		Semifinal		Final	
Athlete	Event	Result	Rank	Result	Rank	Result	Rank	Result	Rank
Inni Aboubacar	Marathon	—						2:28:15	59
Hassan Karimou	Marathon	—						2:43:51	80
Abdou Manzo	Marathon	—						2:25:05	47

== Boxing ==
Men

Athlete	Event	1 Round	2 Round	3 Round	Quarterfinals	Semifinals	Final
Athlete	Event	Opposition Result	Opposition Result	Opposition Result	Opposition Result	Opposition Result	Rank
Badie Ovnteni	Flyweight	BYE	Melvin de Leon (DOM); L RSC-1	—			
Moumouni Siuley	Bantamweight	Tiui Faamaoni (SAM); W RSC-3	Justin Chikwanda (ZAM); L RSC-1	did not advance			
Djingarey Mamoudou	Featherweight	Tomasz Nowak (POL); L 0-5	—				
