= Niger at the 2004 Summer Paralympics =

- IPC code: NIG
- NPC: Fédération Nigérienne des Sports Paralympiques

in Athens
- Competitors: 1 in 1 sport
- Flag bearer: Zoubeirou Issaka
- Medals Ranked 76th: Gold 0 Silver 0 Bronze 0 Total 0

Summer Paralympics appearances (overview)
- 2004; 2008; 2012; 2016; 2020; 2024

Niger competed at the 2004 Summer Paralympics in Athens, Greece. The team included 1 athlete, but won no medals.

== Sports ==
=== Athletics ===
==== Men's track ====
Athlete	Class	Event	Heats		Semifinal		Final	
Athlete	Class	Event	Result	Rank	Result	Rank	Result	Rank
Zoubeirou Issaka	T12	100m	13.90	28	did not advance			

== See also ==
- Niger at the Paralympics
- Niger at the 2004 Summer Olympics
