= Niger at the Olympics =

- IOC code: NIG
- NOC: Nigerien Olympic and National Sports Committee
- Medals Ranked 134th: Gold 0 Silver 1 Bronze 1 Total 2

Summer appearances
- 1964; 1968; 1972; 1976–1980; 1984; 1988; 1992; 1996; 2000; 2004; 2008; 2012; 2016; 2020; 2024

Niger has sent athletes to all Summer Olympic Games held since 1964 except for 1976 and 1980. Only twice has the country won an Olympic medal: Issaka Daborg, who won a bronze medal in light welterweight boxing in 1972, and Abdoul Razak Issoufou, who won a silver medal in men's +80 kg taekwondo in 2016. No athletes from Niger have competed in any Winter Olympic Games.

== Medal tables ==
=== Medals by Summer Games ===
Games	Athletes	Gold	Silver	Bronze	Total	Rank
1964 Tokyo	1	0	0	0	0	–
1968 Mexico City	2	0	0	0	0	–
1972 Munich	4	0	0	1	1	43
1976 Montreal	boycotted					
1980 Moscow	boycotted					
1984 Los Angeles	4	0	0	0	0	–
1988 Seoul	6	0	0	0	0	–
1992 Barcelona	3	0	0	0	0	–
1996 Atlanta	3	0	0	0	0	–
2000 Sydney	4	0	0	0	0	–
2004 Athens	4	0	0	0	0	–
2008 Beijing	4	0	0	0	0	–
2012 London	6	0	0	0	0	–
2016 Rio de Janeiro	6	0	1	0	1	69
2020 Tokyo	7	0	0	0	0	–
2024 Paris	7	0	0	0	0	–
2028 Los Angeles	future event					
2032 Brisbane	future event					
Total		0	1	1	2	134

=== Medals by sport ===
Sport	Gold	Silver	Bronze	Total
Taekwondo	0	1	0	1
Boxing	0	0	1	1
Totals (2 entries)	0	1	1	2

== List of medalists ==
Medal	Name	Games	Sport	Event
Bronze	Issaka Daborg	1972 Munich	Boxing	Men's light welterweight
Silver	Abdoul Razak Issoufou	2016 Rio de Janeiro	Taekwondo	Men's +80kg

== See also ==
- List of flag bearers for Niger at the Olympics
- Niger at the Paralympics
