= Niger at the 2020 Summer Paralympics =

- IPC code: NIG
- NPC: Fédération Nigérienne des Sports Paralympiques

in Tokyo
- Competitors: 2 in 1 sport
- Medals: Gold 0 Silver 0 Bronze 0 Total 0

Summer Paralympics appearances (overview)
- 2004; 2008; 2012; 2016; 2020; 2024

Niger competed at the 2020 Summer Paralympics in Tokyo, Japan, from 24 August to 5 September 2021.

== Athletics ==
Track

| Athlete | Event | Heats | | Final | |
| Athlete | Event | Result | Rank | Result | Rank |
|---|---|---|---|---|---|
| Ibrahim Dayabou | Men's 100 m T47 | 12.41 | 7 | did not advance | did not advance |

Field

| Athlete | Event | Heats | | Final | |
| Athlete | Event | Result | Rank | Result | Rank |
|---|---|---|---|---|---|
| Abdou Fati Hamidou | Women's shot put F57 | N/A | N/A | 5.76 | 14 |

== See also ==
- Niger at the 2020 Summer Olympics
