= Salamtou Hassane =

Nigerien sprinter (born 1987)

Salamtou Hassane (born 1 January 1987) is a Nigerien sprinter who specializes in the 400 metres.

Hassane competed for Niger at the 2004 Summer Olympics in the Women's 400 metres, but was knocked out in the heats. Her result in Athens was good enough to make a national record time of 1:03.28 in the 2004 Olympics Women's 400 metres. In 2008, the 2008 Summer Olympics, Rachidatou Seini Maikido's 1:03.19 time bested what had been Salamtou Hassane's record.
