= Niger at the 2008 Summer Paralympics =

- IPC code: NIG
- NPC: Fédération Nigérienne des Sports Paralympiques

in Beijing
- Competitors: 1 in 1 sport
- Flag bearer: Zakari Amadou (opening & closing)
- Medals Ranked -th: Gold 0 Silver 0 Bronze 0 Total 0

Summer Paralympics appearances (overview)
- 2004; 2008; 2012; 2016; 2020; 2024

Niger sent a delegation to compete at the 2008 Summer Paralympics in Beijing, People's Republic of China. According to official records, the country's only representative was powerlifter Zakari Amadou.

== Powerlifting ==
Men

Athlete	Class	Event	Result	Rank
Zakari Amadou	-	-67.5 kg	110.0	13

== See also ==
- Niger at the Paralympics
- Niger at the 2008 Summer Olympics
