= Niger at the 2024 Summer Paralympics =

- IPC code: NIG
- NPC: Fédération Nigérienne des Sports Paralympiques

in Paris, France August 28, 2024 – September 8, 2024
- Competitors: 1 in 1 sport
- Flag bearer: Ide Oumarou Djabirou
- Medals: Gold 0 Silver 0 Bronze 0 Total 0

Summer Paralympics appearances (overview)
- 2004; 2008; 2012; 2016; 2020; 2024

Niger competed at the 2024 Summer Paralympics in Paris, France, from 28 August to 8 September 2024. It was the nation's sixth consecutive appearance at the Summer Paralympics, since the official debut at 2004.

== Competitors ==
Niger qualified only one competitor in the Games.

Sport	Men	Women	Total
Taekwondo	1	0	1
Total	1	0	1

== Taekwondo ==
Niger entered its only athlete to compete at the Paralympics competition, marking the nation's debut at the sport. Ide Oumarrou Djabirou qualified for Paris 2024, following the triumph of his gold medal results in men's 58 kg classes, at the 2024 African Qualification Tournament in Dakar, Senegal.

Athlete	Event	First round	Quarterfinals	Semifinals	Repechage 1	Final / BM	
Athlete	Event	Opposition Result	Opposition Result	Opposition Result	Opposition Result	Opposition Result	Rank
Ide Oumarrou Djabirou	Men's –58 kg	Martin (ESP); L13-30	Did not advance				

== See also ==
- Niger at the 2024 Summer Olympics
- Niger at the Paralympics
