= Roberto López (rower) =

Salvadoran rower (born 1993)

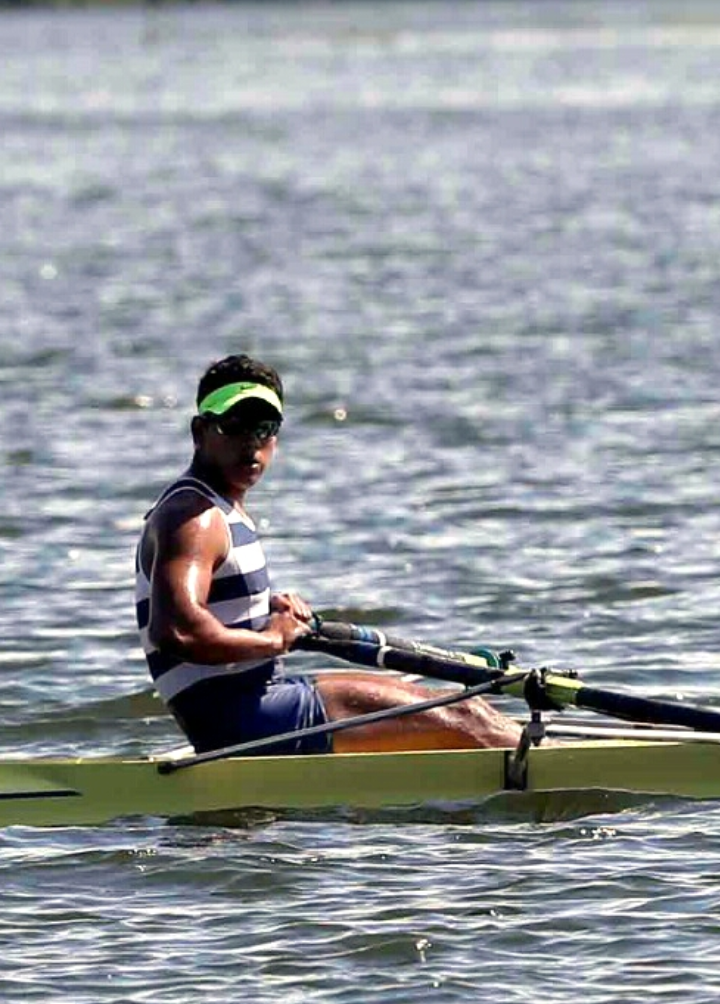

Personal information
- Born: 31 July 1993 (age 31); San Salvador, El Salvador

Sport
- Sport: Rowing

Roberto López (born 31 July 1993) is a Salvadoran rower. He competed in the men's single sculls event at the 2012 Summer Olympics.
