= Niger at the 2012 Summer Olympics =

- IOC code: NIG
- NOC: Nigerien Olympic and National Sports Committee

in London
- Competitors: 6 in 5 sports
- Flag bearer: Moustapha Hima
- Medals: Gold 0 Silver 0 Bronze 0 Total 0

Summer Olympics appearances (overview)
- 1964; 1968; 1972; 1976–1980; 1984; 1988; 1992; 1996; 2000; 2004; 2008; 2012; 2016; 2020; 2024

Niger competed with six athletes in five sports at the 2012 Summer Olympics in London, held from 27 July to 12 August 2012. This was the nation's eleventh appearance at the Olympics, having competed at every Summer Olympics since 1964 with the exception of the 1976 Summer Olympics in Montreal, and the 1980 Summer Olympics in Moscow because of the African and the United States boycotts.

Nigerien Olympic and National Sports Committee (French: Comité Olympique et Sportif National du Niger, COSNI) sent the nation's largest delegation to the Games since 1988. A total of 6 athletes, 4 men and 2 women, competing in 5 different sports. Hamadou Djibo Issaka, became the first Nigerien rower to compete at the Olympics, was the oldest member of the team, at age 35; while freestyle swimmer Nafissatou Moussa Adamou was the youngest at age 14. Welterweight boxer Moustapha Hima, on the other hand, was appointed by COSNI to be the nation's flag bearer at the opening ceremony.

Niger, however, failed to win a single Olympic medal in London, since its last time at the 1972 Summer Olympics in Munich.

== Press reaction ==
On 28 July, the British press gave single sculls rower Hamadou Djibo Issaka a wave of attention, as he finished far behind his competitors. Having taken up rowing at an intensive training camp three months before, he was compared by the press with Eric "the Eel" Moussambani, a swimmer from Equatorial Guinea at the 2000 Summer Olympics in Sydney; thus, Issaka was featured in numerous headlines where the press called him, "Issaka the Otter", "Hamadou The Keel", and the "Sculling Sloth".

Nigerien newspaper Le Sahel congratulated Issaka, stating that "he managed to seduce lovers of rowing, and to honor the national colors." The paper also noted that despite its reputation as a desert nation, rowing could flourish in their country, where the Niger River runs for 550 km through the nation.

Following the performance of two athletes, boxer Moustapha Hima and judoka Zakari Gourouza, the Nigerien press declared them "encouraging results", noting that Hima acquitted himself well and expects to return to the 2016 Olympics, and Zakari Gourouza was the first Nigerien combat athlete to progress beyond his first round opponent since medal winning boxer Issaka Dabore in 1972.

== Political delegation ==
Kounou Hassane, Niger's minister of youth, sport, and culture, and Mahamadou Doula Talata, government director of sport, and COSNI chairman, attended the Olympic Games in London. On 31 July, while speaking at an Iftar dinner for Nigerien athletes at the London Olympic Village, the minister congratulated the three athletes who had already competed. "The results you obtained are after all, honorable. You have valiantly defended the colors of our country, and I commend you for your courage and boldness.", according to the minister who addressed his statement to the athletes.

== Athletics ==
Track runners Rabiou Guero Gao, and Nafissa Souleymane were selected to the team by wild card entries.

Key

- Note–Ranks given for track events are within the athlete's heat only
- Q = Qualified for the next round
- q = Qualified for the next round as a fastest loser or, in field events, by position without achieving the qualifying target
- NR = National record
- N/A = Round not applicable for the event
- Bye = Athlete not required to compete in round

Men

Athlete	Event	Heat		Semifinal		Final	
Athlete	Event	Result	Rank	Result	Rank	Result	Rank
Rabiou Guero Gao	1500 m	4:05.46	15	Did not advance			

Women

Athlete	Event	Heat		Quarterfinal		Semifinal		Final	
Athlete	Event	Result	Rank	Result	Rank	Result	Rank	Result	Rank
Nafissa Souleymane	100 m	12.81	6	Did not advance					

== Boxing ==
Moustapha Hima qualified for Niger in the men's welterweight division.

Men

Athlete	Event	Round of 32	Round of 16	Quarterfinals	Semifinals	Final	
Athlete	Event	Opposition Result	Opposition Result	Opposition Result	Opposition Result	Opposition Result	Rank
Moustapha Hima	Welterweight	Hammond (AUS); L 6–13	Did not advance				

== Judo ==
Niger has qualified one judoka.

Athlete	Event	Round of 64	Round of 32	Round of 16	Quarterfinals	Semifinals	Repechage	Final / BM	
Athlete	Event	Opposition Result	Opposition Result	Opposition Result	Opposition Result	Opposition Result	Opposition Result	Opposition Result	Rank
Zakari Gourouza	Men's −60 kg	Godoy (HON); W 0100–0000	Galstyan (RUS); L 0000–0101	Did not advance					

== Rowing ==
Niger has received one wild card in this sport. Hamadou Djibo Issaka, formerly a swimmer, became the first single sculls rower to represent his nation at the Olympics.

Men

Athlete	Event	Heats		Repechage		Quarterfinals		Semifinals		Final	
Athlete	Event	Time	Rank	Time	Rank	Time	Rank	Time	Rank	Time	Rank
Hamadou Djibo Issaka	Single sculls	8:25.56	5 R	8:39.66	4 SE/F	Bye		9:07.99	4 FF	8:53.88	33

Qualification Legend: FA=Final A (medal); FB=Final B (non-medal); FC=Final C (non-medal); FD=Final D (non-medal); FE=Final E (non-medal); FF=Final F (non-medal); SA/B=Semifinals A/B; SC/D=Semifinals C/D; SE/F=Semifinals E/F; QF=Quarterfinals; R=Repechage

== Swimming ==
Niger selected one swimmer by a wild card entry from FINA.

Women

Athlete	Event	Heat		Semifinal		Final	
Athlete	Event	Time	Rank	Time	Rank	Time	Rank
Nafissatou Moussa Adamou	50 m freestyle	37.29	70	Did not advance			
