= Niger at the 1972 Summer Olympics =

- IOC code: NIG
- NOC: Nigerien Olympic and National Sports Committee

in Munich
- Competitors: 4 in 1 sport
- Flag bearer: Issaka Daboré
- Medals Ranked 43rd: Gold 0 Silver 0 Bronze 1 Total 1

Summer Olympics appearances (overview)
- 1964; 1968; 1972; 1976–1980; 1984; 1988; 1992; 1996; 2000; 2004; 2008; 2012; 2016; 2020; 2024

Niger competed at the 1972 Summer Olympics in Munich, West Germany. The nation won its first ever Olympic medal at these Games.

== Medalists ==
=== Bronze ===
- Issake Dabore — Boxing, Men's Light Welterweight

== Boxing ==
Men

Athlete	Event	1 Round	2 Round	3 Round	Quarterfinals	Semifinals	Final	
Athlete	Event	Opposition Result	Opposition Result	Opposition Result	Opposition Result	Opposition Result	Opposition Result	Rank
Mayaki Seydou	Bantamweight	Mehmet Kunova (TUR); W 3-2	Stefan Förster (GDR); L 0-5	Did not advance				
Harouna Lago	Featherweight	Boris Kuznetsov (URS); L Ko-1	Did not advance					
Issaka Dabore	Light Welterweight	Odartey Lawson (GHA); W TKO-3	Park Tai-Shik (KOR); W TKO-3	BYE	Kyoji Shinohara (JPN); W 3-2	Angel Angelov (BUL); L 0-5	Did not advance	Bronze medal
Issoufou Habou	Light Middleweight	BYE	Mohamed Majeri (TUN); L 0-5	Did not advance				

== Sources ==
- Official Olympic Reports
- International Olympic Committee results database
