= Niger at the 2023 World Aquatics Championships =

- Flag of Niger
- FINA code: NIG
- National federation: Fédération Nigérienne des Sports Nautiques

in Fukuoka, Japan
- Competitors: 2 in 1 sport
- Medals: Gold 0 Silver 0 Bronze 0 Total 0

World Aquatics Championships appearances
- 1973; 1975; 1978; 1982; 1986; 1991; 1994; 1998; 2001; 2003; 2005; 2007; 2009; 2011; 2013; 2015; 2017; 2019; 2022; 2023; 2024

Niger is set to compete at the 2023 World Aquatics Championships in Fukuoka, Japan from 14 to 30 July.

== Swimming ==
Niger entered 2 swimmers.

Men

Athlete	Event	Heat		Semifinal		Final	
Athlete	Event	Time	Rank	Time	Rank	Time	Rank
Alassane Seydou	50 metre freestyle	Did not start					
Alassane Seydou	50 metre butterfly	27.91	75	Did not advance			

Women

Athlete	Event	Heat		Semifinal		Final	
Athlete	Event	Time	Rank	Time	Rank	Time	Rank
Salima Ahmadou Youssoufou	50 metre freestyle	37.80	101	Did not advance			
Salima Ahmadou Youssoufou	50 metre breaststroke	45.97	49	Did not advance			
