= Niger at the 2024 Summer Olympics =

- IOC code: NIG
- NOC: Nigerien Olympic and National Sports Committee

in Paris, France 26 July 2024 – 11 August 2024
- Competitors: 7 (5 men and 2 women) in 5 sports
- Flag bearers: Abdoul Razak Issoufou & Samira Awali Boubacar
- Medals: Gold 0 Silver 0 Bronze 0 Total 0

Summer Olympics appearances (overview)
- 1964; 1968; 1972; 1976–1980; 1984; 1988; 1992; 1996; 2000; 2004; 2008; 2012; 2016; 2020; 2024

Niger competed at the 2024 Summer Olympics in Paris from 26 July to 11 August 2024. It was the nation's fourteenth appearance at the Summer Olympics. Since the nation made its debut in 1964, Nigerien athletes have participated in every edition of the Summer Olympic Games, except for two occasions, the 1976 Summer Olympics in Montreal, and the 1980 Summer Olympics in Moscow because of the African and the US-led boycotts, respectively.

== Competitors ==
The following is the list of number of competitors in the Games.

| Sport | Men | Women | Total |
|---|---|---|---|
| Athletics | 0 | 1 | 1 |
| Fencing | 1 | 0 | 1 |
| Judo | 1 | 0 | 1 |
| Swimming | 1 | 1 | 2 |
| Taekwondo | 2 | 0 | 2 |
| Total | 5 | 2 | 7 |

== Athletics ==
Niger sent one sprinter to compete at the 2024 Summer Olympics.

Key

- Note–Ranks given for track events are within the athlete's heat only
- Q = Qualified for the next round
- q = Qualified for the next round as a fastest loser or, in field events, by position without achieving the qualifying target
- NR = National record
- N/A = Round not applicable for the event
- Bye = Athlete not required to compete in round

Track events

| Athlete | Event | Preliminary | | Heat | | Semifinal | | Final | |
| Athlete | Event | Result | Rank | Result | Rank | Result | Rank | Result | Rank |
|---|---|---|---|---|---|---|---|---|---|
| Samira Awali Boubacar | Women's 100 m | 12.06 | 5 | Did Not Advance | | | | | |

== Fencing ==
Niger entered one fencer into the Olympic competition. Evann Girault qualified for the games by winning the gold medal in the men's individual sabre events at the 2024 African Zonal Qualifying Tournament in Algiers, Algeria; marking the nation's debut at these sport.

| Athlete | Event | Round of 32 | Round of 16 | Quarterfinal | Semifinal | Final / BM | | |
| Athlete | Event | Opposition Score | Opposition Score | Opposition Score | Opposition Score | Opposition Score | Opposition Score | Rank |
|---|---|---|---|---|---|---|---|---|
| Evann Girault | Men's sabre | Oh S-u (KOR); L 8–15 | Did not advance | | | | | 30 |

== Judo ==
Niger qualified one judoka for the following weight class at the Games. Ismael Alhassane (men's 66 kg) qualified for the games through the allocations of universality places.

| Athlete | Event | Round of 32 | Round of 16 | Quarterfinals | Semifinals | Repechage | Final / BM | |
| Athlete | Event | Opposition Result | Opposition Result | Opposition Result | Opposition Result | Opposition Result | Opposition Result | Rank |
|---|---|---|---|---|---|---|---|---|
| Ismael Alhassane | Men's −66 kg | Pongrácz (HUN); L 00–10 | Did not advance | | | | | |

== Swimming ==
Niger sent two swimmers to compete at the 2024 Paris Olympics.

| Athlete | Event | Heat | | Semifinal | | Final | |
| Athlete | Event | Time | Rank | Time | Rank | Time | Rank |
|---|---|---|---|---|---|---|---|
| Marouane Mamane | Men's 50 m freestyle | 30.66 | 72 | Did not advance | | | |
| Salima Youssoufou | Women's 50 m freestyle | 33.66 | 74 | Did not advance | | | |

Qualifiers for the latter rounds (Q) of all events were decided on a time-only basis; therefore, positions shown are overall results versus competitors in all heats.

== Taekwondo ==
Niger qualified two athletes to compete at the games. Rio 2016 silver and Tokyo 2020 Olympian Abdoul Razak Issoufou; and his compatriot Nouridine Issaka, qualified for their games by, by virtue of their victory in the semifinal results, in their own division, at the 2024 African Qualification Tournament in Dakar, Senegal.

| Athlete | Event | Round of 16 | Quarterfinals | Semifinals | Repechage | Final / BM | |
| Athlete | Event | Opposition Result | Opposition Result | Opposition Result | Opposition Result | Opposition Result | Rank |
|---|---|---|---|---|---|---|---|
| Nouridine Issaka | Men's −58 kg | Lewis (AUS); L 0–2 | Did not advance | | | | |
| Abdoul Razak Issoufou | Men's 80+ kg | Cunningham (GBR); L 0–2 | — | | Alba (CUB); L 1–2 | Did not advance | |
