= Niger at the 1984 Summer Olympics =

- IOC code: NIG
- NOC: Nigerien Olympic and National Sports Committee

in Los Angeles
- Competitors: 4 in 2 sports
- Flag bearer: Boubagar Soumana
- Medals: Gold 0 Silver 0 Bronze 0 Total 0

Summer Olympics appearances (overview)
- 1964; 1968; 1972; 1976–1980; 1984; 1988; 1992; 1996; 2000; 2004; 2008; 2012; 2016; 2020; 2024

Niger was represented at the 1984 Summer Olympics in Los Angeles, California, United States by the Nigerien Olympic and National Sports Committee.

In total, four athletes – all men – represented Mali in two different sports including athletics and boxing.

== Background ==
The Nigerien Olympic and National Sports Committee gained recognition from the International Olympic Committee in 1964 and Niger made their Olympic debut at the 1964 Summer Olympics in Tokyo, Japan. They participated in the following two games before taking part in the African boycott of the 1976 Summer Olympics in Montreal, Quebec, Canada. They also took part in the United States-led boycott of the 1980 Summer Olympics in Moscow, Russian Soviet Federative Socialist Republic, Soviet Union. The 1984 Summer Olympics in Los Angeles, California, United States marked their fourth appearance at the Olympics.

== Competitors ==
In total, four athletes represented Niger at the 1984 Summer Olympics in Los Angeles, California, United States across two different sports.

Sport	Men	Women	Total
Athletics	2	0	2
Boxing	2	—	2
Total	4	0	4

== Athletics ==
In total, two Nigerien athletes participated in the athletics events – Adamou Allassane in the men's 800 m and Moussa Daweye in the men's 1,500 m.

The athletics events took place at the Los Angeles Memorial Coliseum in Exposition Park, Los Angeles from 3 to 12 August 1984.

Athlete	Event	Heat		Quarterfinal		Semifinal		Final	
Athlete	Event	Result	Rank	Result	Rank	Result	Rank	Result	Rank
Adamou Allassane	1,500 m	3:56.43	9	—					
Moussa Daweye	800 m	1:52.08	(4) DQ	—					

== Boxing ==
In total, two Nigerien athletes participated in the boxing events – Chibou Amna in the flyweight category and Boubacar Soumana in the featherweight category.

The boxing events took place at the Los Angeles Memorial Sports Arena in Exposition Park, Los Angeles from 29 July to 11 August 1984.

Athlete	Event	1 Round	2 Round	3 Round	Quarterfinals	Semifinals	Final	
Athlete	Event	Opposition Result	Opposition Result	Opposition Result	Opposition Result	Opposition Result	Opposition Result	Rank
Chibou Amna	Flyweight	David Mwaba (TAN); L 0-5	did not advance					
Boubacar Soumana	Featherweight	Steve Pagendam (CAN); L TKO-3	did not advance					
