= Niger at the 1964 Summer Olympics =

- IOC code: NIG (NGR used at these Games)
- NOC: Nigerien Olympic and National Sports Committee

in Tokyo
- Competitors: 1 in 1 sport
- Flag bearer: Issake Dabore
- Medals: Gold 0 Silver 0 Bronze 0 Total 0

Summer Olympics appearances (overview)
- 1964; 1968; 1972; 1976–1980; 1984; 1988; 1992; 1996; 2000; 2004; 2008; 2012; 2016; 2020; 2024

Niger competed in the Olympic Games for the first time at the 1964 Summer Olympics in Tokyo, Japan.

== Boxing ==
Men

Athlete	Event	1 Round	2 Round	Quarterfinals	Semifinals	Final	
Athlete	Event	Opposition Result	Opposition Result	Opposition Result	Opposition Result	Opposition Result	Rank
Issaka Dabore	Welterweight	Tshun-Fu Hong (ROC); W TKO-2	Hans Pedersen (DEN); W TKO-3	Pertti Purhonen (FIN); L 2-3	did not advance		
