= Hamadou Djibo Issaka =

Nigerien athlete (born 1977)

Personal information
- Born: July 3, 1977 (age 49)

Sport
- Sport: Swimming; Rowing

Hamadou Djibo Issaka (born 3 July 1977) is a Nigerien athlete. A competitive swimmer, Djibo Issaka trained as a Men's single sculls rower for the 2012 Summer Olympics in London to take a development spot offered to the Nigerien federation by the International Olympic Committee.

== 2012 Olympics ==
Djibo Issaka, a gardener and swimming pool attendant, was chosen by Niger to train as a sculler just three months prior to the 2012 Summer Olympics, receiving his first training in competitive rowing in Egypt, then spending two months at the International Rowing Development Centre in Tunisia. He was chosen for a wild card from the IOC Tripartite Commission, adding him to the full pool of otherwise qualified rowers, in a program that seeks to develop sports outside traditional competitors. He trained in the Belgian town of Hazewinkel, prior to the opening of the games.

On 28 July, Djibo Issaka gained widespread press attention for his first Olympic appearance in the 2000 metre single sculls heat, in which he finished last with a time of 8:25.56, almost a minute behind his nearest competitor and almost 1 minute 40 seconds behind the winner, Mahe Drysdale. The British press gave Djibo Issaka a wave of attention following his first appearance, comparing him with Equiguinean swimmer Eric "the Eel" Moussambani from Sydney 2000, and giving Djibo Issaka headline nicknames of "Issaka the Otter", "Hamadou the Keel", and the "Sculling Sloth".

While crowds and the press cheered him, British former Olympic Gold Medal rower Steve Redgrave criticised Djibo Issaka's inclusion. Despite these comments, the IOC explained Djibo Issaka had not taken the place of any other qualified rower, but was one of a number of Olympians added to additional places created after qualification.

In total, Djibo Issaka rowed in four rounds of the competition, finishing last in each race.

Hamadou Djibo Issaka's performances at the 2012 Summer Olympics Men's single sculls
Stage	Time	Position
Heat 4	8:25.56	5/5
Repechage 2	8:39.66	5/5
Semifinal E/F 1	9:07.99	4/4
Final F	8:53.88	3/3

== See also ==
- Niger at the 2012 Summer Olympics
- List of uncompetitive athletes
