= List of Nigerien records in swimming =

The Nigerien records in swimming are the best performances of swimmers from Niger, recognised and ratified by the Federation Nigerienne des Sports Nautiques.

All records were set in finals unless noted otherwise.

== Long Course (50 m) ==
=== Men ===
Event	Time		Name	Club	Date	Meet	Location	Ref
50 m freestyle	24.27	h	Alassane Seydou	Niger	24 August 2022	African Championships	Tunis, Tunisia	
100 m freestyle	54.73	h	Alassane Seydou	Niger	21 June 2022	World Championships	Budapest, Hungary	
200 m freestyle								
400 m freestyle								
800 m freestyle								
1500 m freestyle								
50 m backstroke	30.01	h	Alassane Seydou	Niger	27 July 2019	World Championships	Gwangju, South Korea	
100 m backstroke								
200 m backstroke								
50 m breaststroke	35.00	h	Alassane Seydou	Niger	25 July 2017	World Championships	Budapest, Hungary	
100 m breaststroke	1:22.54	h	Alassane Seydou	Niger	23 July 2017	World Championships	Budapest, Hungary	
200 m breaststroke								
50 m butterfly	27.91	h	Alassane Seydou	Niger	23 July 2023	World Championships	Fukuoka, Japan	
100 m butterfly								
200 m butterfly								
200 m individual medley								
400 m individual medley								
4×100 m freestyle relay								
4×200 m freestyle relay								
4×100 m medley relay								

Legend: # – Record awaiting ratification by Federation Nigerienne des Sports Nautiques; WR – World record; AF – African record;
Records not set in finals: h – heat; sf – semifinal; r – relay 1st leg; rh – relay heat 1st leg; b – B final; † – en route to final mark; tt – time trial

=== Women ===
Event	Time		Name	Club	Date	Meet	Location	Ref
50 m freestyle	32.21	h	Roukaya Mahamane	Niger	30 July 2021	Olympic Games	Tokyo, Japan	
100 m freestyle	1:18.94	h	Roukaya Mahamane	Niger	22 June 2022	World Championships	Budapest, Hungary	
200 m freestyle								
400 m freestyle								
800 m freestyle								
1500 m freestyle								
50 m backstroke								
100 m backstroke								
200 m backstroke								
50 m breaststroke	45.97	h	Salima Ahmadou Youssoufou	Niger	29 July 2023	World Championships	Fukuoka, Japan	
100 m breaststroke								
200 m breaststroke								
50 m butterfly								
100 m butterfly								
200 m butterfly								
200 m individual medley								
400 m individual medley								
4×100 m freestyle relay								
4×200 m freestyle relay								
4×100 m medley relay								

Legend: # – Record awaiting ratification by Federation Nigerienne des Sports Nautiques; WR – World record; AF – African record;
Records not set in finals: h – heat; sf – semifinal; r – relay 1st leg; rh – relay heat 1st leg; b – B final; † – en route to final mark; tt – time trial

== Short Course (25 m) ==
=== Men ===
Event	Time		Name	Club	Date	Meet	Location	Ref
50m freestyle	23.61	h	Alassane Seydou	Niger	18 December 2021	World Championships	Abu Dhabi, United Arab Emirates	
100m freestyle	52.87	h	Alassane Seydou	Niger	20 December 2021	World Championships	Abu Dhabi, United Arab Emirates	
200 m freestyle								
400 m freestyle								
800 m freestyle								
1500 m freestyle								
50 m backstroke								
100 m backstroke								
200 m backstroke								
50m breaststroke	33.45	h	Alassane Seydou	Niger	10 December 2016	World Championships	Windsor, Canada	
100m breaststroke	1:16.30	h	Alassane Seydou	Niger	6 December 2016	World Championships	Windsor, Canada	
200 m breaststroke								
50m butterfly	29.38	h, =	Alassane Seydou	Niger	9 December 2016	World Championships	Windsor, Canada	
50m butterfly	29.38	h, =	Albachir Mouctar	Niger	9 December 2016	World Championships	Windsor, Canada	
100m butterfly	1:15.09	h	Albachir Mouctar	Niger	12 December 2018	World Championships	Hangzhou, China	
200 m butterfly								
100 m individual medley								
200 m individual medley								
400 m individual medley								
4×50 m freestyle relay								
4×100 m freestyle relay								
4×200 m freestyle relay								
4×50 m medley relay								
4×100 m medley relay								

Legend: # – Record awaiting ratification by Federation Nigerienne des Sports Nautiques; WR – World record; AF – African record;
Records not set in finals: h – heat; sf – semifinal; r – relay 1st leg; rh – relay heat 1st leg; b – B final; † – en route to final mark; tt – time trial

=== Women ===
Event	Time		Name	Club	Date	Meet	Location	Ref
50m freestyle	34.91	h	Roukaya Mahamane	Niger	15 December 2018	World Championships	Hangzhou, China	
100 m freestyle								
200 m freestyle								
400 m freestyle								
800 m freestyle								
1500 m freestyle								
50m backstroke								
100m backstroke								
200m backstroke								
50m breaststroke	44.55	h	Roukaya Mahamane	Niger	11 December 2018	World Championships	Hangzhou, China	
100 m breaststroke								
200 m breaststroke								
50 m butterfly								
100 m butterfly								
200 m butterfly								
100 m individual medley								
200 m individual medley								
400 m individual medley								
4×50 m freestyle relay								
4×100 m freestyle relay								
4×200 m freestyle relay								
4×50 m medley relay								
4×100 m medley relay								

Legend: # – Record awaiting ratification by Federation Nigerienne des Sports Nautiques; WR – World record; AF – African record;
Records not set in finals: h – heat; sf – semifinal; r – relay 1st leg; rh – relay heat 1st leg; b – B final; † – en route to final mark; tt – time trial
