= Moustapha Hima =

Nigerien boxer (born 1992)

Moustapha Abdoulaye Hima (born 1 January 1992) is a Nigerien boxer. He competed for Niger in the 2012 Summer Olympics as a welterweight (69 kg). Abdoulaye Hima was Niger's flag bearer in the opening ceremony. On 29 July Abdoulaye Hima lost a 6-13 points decision in the Round of 32 to Cameron Hammond of Australia.

== See also ==
- Niger at the 2012 Summer Olympics

Olympic Games
Preceded by Mohamed Alhousseini	Flagbearer for Niger; London 2012	Succeeded by Abdoul Razak Issoufou
