= Aymen Mejri =

Tunisian rower

Personal information
- Nationality: Tunisian
- Born: 16 August 1988 (age 36); Tunis, Tunisia

Sport
- Sport: Rowing

Aymen Mejri (born 16 August 1988) is a Tunisian rower. He competed in the men's single sculls event at the 2012 Summer Olympics.
