= Michał Słoma =

Polish rower

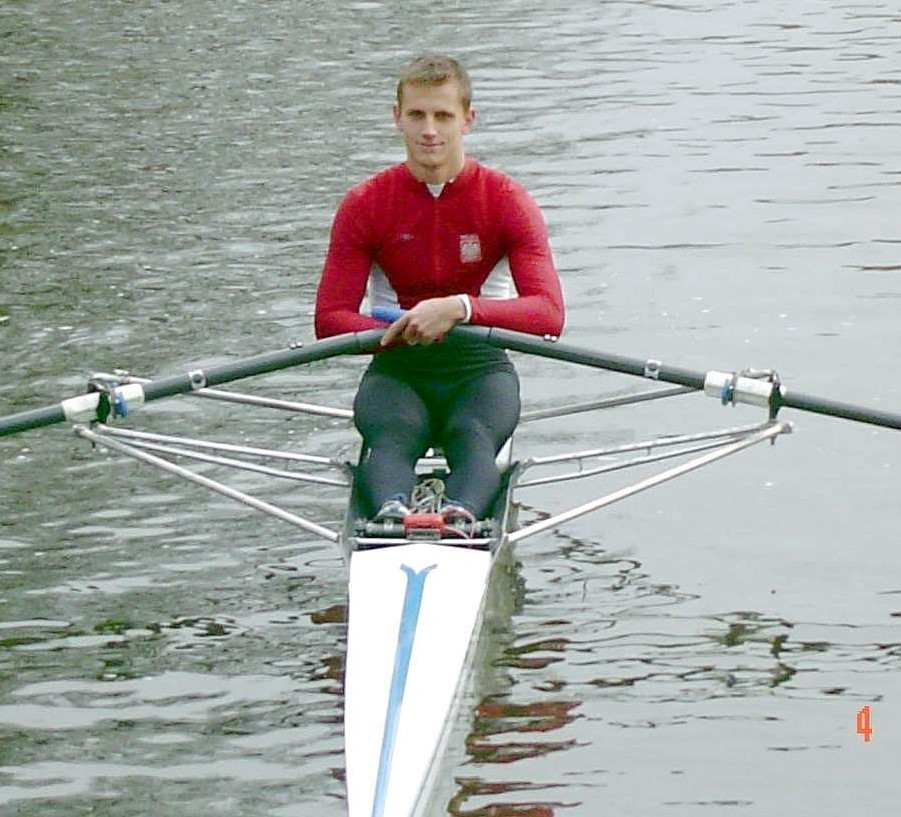
- Słoma in 2004

Personal information
- Nickname: Slomka
- Nationality: Polish
- Born: 31 January 1982 (age 44) Prostki, Warmian-Masurian, Poland
- Height: 1.94 m (6 ft 4 1/2 in)
- Weight: 91 kg (201 lb)

Sport
- Sport: Rowing
- Club: AZS UMK Energa
- Coached by: Alex Wojciechowski
Medal record
Men's rowing
Representing Poland
European Championships
Bronze medal – third place	2009 Brest	Quadruple sculls

Michał Słoma (born 31 January 1982 in Prostki, Warmian-Masurian) is a Polish rower. He won a silver medal, as a member of Polish rowing team, in the men's quadruple sculls (5:55.09) at the 2009 European Rowing Championships in Brest, Belarus, and later represented Poland at his first Olympics in London. Sloma also trained for AZS UMK Energa in Toruń under his personal coaches Alex Wojciechowski, Jaroslaw Janowski, Mariusz Szumanski, and Witold Sroga.

Sloma qualified for the men's single sculls at the 2012 Summer Olympics in London by earning a third spot from FISA Olympic Qualification Regatta in Lucerne, Switzerland with an entry time of 7:04.51. Rowing in the C-Final, Sloma paddled his pace to overhaul Monaco's Mathias Raymond for a fifth-place effort and seventeenth overall in 7:34.98. Earlier in the prelims, Sloma posted a lifetime best of 6:54.58 in heat four to secure his automatic slot for the subsequent stages.
