= Niger at the 2020 Summer Olympics =

- Flag of Niger
- IOC code: NIG
- NOC: Nigerien Olympic and National Sports Committee

in Tokyo, Japan July 23, 2021 – August 8, 2021
- Competitors: 7 in 4 sports
- Flag bearers (opening): Roukaya Mahamane; Abdoul Razak Issoufou
- Flag bearer (closing): N/A
- Medals: Gold 0 Silver 0 Bronze 0 Total 0

Summer Olympics appearances (overview)
- 1964; 1968; 1972; 1976–1980; 1984; 1988; 1992; 1996; 2000; 2004; 2008; 2012; 2016; 2020; 2024

Niger competed at the 2020 Summer Olympics in Tokyo. Originally scheduled to take place from 24 July to 9 August 2020, the Games were postponed to 23 July to 8 August 2021, because of the COVID-19 pandemic. It was the nation's thirteenth appearance at the Summer Olympics. Since the nation made its debut in 1964, Nigerien athletes have participated in every edition of the Summer Olympic Games, except for two occasions, the 1976 Summer Olympics in Montreal, and the 1980 Summer Olympics in Moscow because of the African and the US-led boycotts, respectively.

== Competitors ==
The following is the list of number of competitors in the Games.

Sport	Men	Women	Total
Athletics	1	1	2
Judo	1	0	1
Swimming	1	1	2
Taekwondo	1	1	2
Total	4	3	7

== Athletics ==
Nigerien athletes achieved the entry standards, either by qualifying time or by world ranking, in the following track and field events (up to a maximum of 3 athletes in each event):

Key

- Note–Ranks given for track events are within the athlete's heat only
- Q = Qualified for the next round
- q = Qualified for the next round as a fastest loser or, in field events, by position without achieving the qualifying target
- NR = National record
- N/A = Round not applicable for the event
- Bye = Athlete not required to compete in round

Track & road events

Athlete	Event	Heat		Quarterfinal		Semifinal		Final	
Athlete	Event	Result	Rank	Result	Rank	Result	Rank	Result	Rank
Badamassi Saguirou	Men's 100 m	10.87 PB	7	Did not advance					
Aminatou Seyni	Women's 200 m	22.72 SB	3 Q	—		22.54 NR	5	Did not advance	

== Judo ==
Niger qualified one judoka for the men's half-lightweight category (66 kg) at the Games. Ismael Alhassane accepted a continental berth from Africa as the nation's top-ranked judoka outside of direct qualifying position in the IJF World Ranking List of June 28, 2021.

Athlete	Event	Round of 32	Round of 16	Quarterfinals	Semifinals	Repechage	Final / BM	
Athlete	Event	Opposition Result	Opposition Result	Opposition Result	Opposition Result	Opposition Result	Opposition Result	Rank
Ismael Alhassane	Men's −66 kg	Le Blouch (FRA); L 00–10	Did not advance					

== Swimming ==
Niger received a universality invitation from FINA to send two top-ranked swimmers (one per gender) in their respective individual events to the Olympics, based on the FINA Points System of June 28, 2021.

Athlete	Event	Heat		Semifinal		Final	
Athlete	Event	Time	Rank	Time	Rank	Time	Rank
Alassane Seydou	Men's 50 m freestyle	24.75	50	Did not advance			
Roukaya Mahamane	Women's 50 m freestyle	32.21	76	Did not advance			

== Taekwondo ==
Niger entered two athletes into the taekwondo competition at the Games. Rio 2016 silver medalist and 2017 world champion Abdoul Razak Issoufou qualified directly for the second time in the men's heavyweight category (+80 kg) by finishing among the top five taekwondo practitioners at the end of the WT Olympic Rankings. Meanwhile, Tekiath Ben Yessouf secured the remaining spot on the Nigerien squad with a top two finish in the women's lightweight category (57 kg) at the 2020 African Qualification Tournament in Rabat, Morocco.

Athlete	Event	Qualification	Round of 16	Quarterfinals	Semifinals	Repechage	Final / BM	
Athlete	Event	Opposition Result	Opposition Result	Opposition Result	Opposition Result	Opposition Result	Opposition Result	Rank
Abdoul Razak Issoufou	Men's +80 kg	—	Gbané (CIV); L 9–15	Did not advance				
Tekiath Ben Yessouf	Women's −57 kg	Bye	Hamada (JPN); W 11–6	Minina (ROC); L 10–15	Did not advance	Tzeli (GRE); W 2–0	Lo C-l (TPE); L 6–10	5
