= Niger at the 2004 Summer Olympics =

- IOC code: NIG
- NOC: Nigerien Olympic and National Sports Committee

in Athens
- Competitors: 4 in 3 sports
- Flag bearer: Abdou Alassane Dji Bo
- Medals: Gold 0 Silver 0 Bronze 0 Total 0

Summer Olympics appearances (overview)
- 1964; 1968; 1972; 1976–1980; 1984; 1988; 1992; 1996; 2000; 2004; 2008; 2012; 2016; 2020; 2024

Niger competed at the 2004 Summer Olympics in Athens, Greece, from 13 to 29 August 2004.

== Athletics ==
Nigerien athletes have so far achieved qualifying standards in the following athletics events (up to a maximum of 3 athletes in each event at the 'A' Standard, and 1 at the 'B' Standard).

Men

| Athlete | Event | Heat | | Semifinal | | Final | |
| Athlete | Event | Result | Rank | Result | Rank | Result | Rank |
|---|---|---|---|---|---|---|---|
| Ibrahim Tondi | 400 m hurdles | 52.62 | 7 | did not advance | | | |

Women

| Athlete | Event | Heat | | Semifinal | | Final | |
| Athlete | Event | Result | Rank | Result | Rank | Result | Rank |
|---|---|---|---|---|---|---|---|
| Salamtou Hassane | 400 m | 1:03.28 NR | 7 | did not advance | | | |

Key

- Note–Ranks given for track events are within the athlete's heat only
- Q = Qualified for the next round
- q = Qualified for the next round as a fastest loser or, in field events, by position without achieving the qualifying target
- NR = National record
- N/A = Round not applicable for the event
- Bye = Athlete not required to compete in round

== Judo ==
| Athlete | Event | Round of 32 | Round of 16 | Quarterfinals | Semifinals | Repechage 1 | Repechage 2 | Repechage 3 | Final / BM | |
| Athlete | Event | Opposition Result | Opposition Result | Opposition Result | Opposition Result | Opposition Result | Opposition Result | Opposition Result | Opposition Result | Rank |
|---|---|---|---|---|---|---|---|---|---|---|
| Abdou Alassane Dji Bo | Men's −66 kg | Krnáč (SVK); L 0000–0200 | did not advance | | | Peñas (ESP); L 0000–1101 | did not advance | | | |

== Swimming ==
Men

| Athlete | Event | Heat | | Semifinal | | Final | |
| Athlete | Event | Time | Rank | Time | Rank | Time | Rank |
|---|---|---|---|---|---|---|---|
| Ibrahim Maliki | 50 m freestyle | 26.81 | 69 | did not advance | | | |
