= Niger at the 1968 Summer Olympics =

- IOC code: NIG
- NOC: Nigerien Olympic and National Sports Committee

in Mexico City
- Competitors: 2 in 1 sport
- Medals: Gold 0 Silver 0 Bronze 0 Total 0

Summer Olympics appearances (overview)
- 1964; 1968; 1972; 1976–1980; 1984; 1988; 1992; 1996; 2000; 2004; 2008; 2012; 2016; 2020; 2024

Niger competed at the 1968 Summer Olympics in Mexico City, Mexico.

They fielded two boxers, both men.

== Boxing ==
Men

Athlete	Event	First round	Second round	Third round	Quarterfinals	Semifinals	Final	
Athlete	Event	Opposition Result	Opposition Result	Opposition Result	Opposition Result	Opposition Result	Opposition Result	Rank
Dary Dasuda	Bantamweight	Sulley Shittu (GHA); L 1–4	did not advance					
Issaka Dabore	Light welterweight	BYE	José Marín (CRC); W 5–0	Yevgeny Frolov (URS); L 1–4	did not advance			
