= Nour El Din Hassanein =

Egyptian rower

Personal information
- Nationality: Egyptian
- Born: 10 August 1988 (age 36); Shamal Sina, Egypt

Sport
- Sport: Rowing

Nour El Din Hassanein (born 10 August 1988) is an Egyptian rower. He competed in the men's single sculls event at the 2012 Summer Olympics.
