= Rabiou Guero Gao =

Nigerien runner (born 1988)

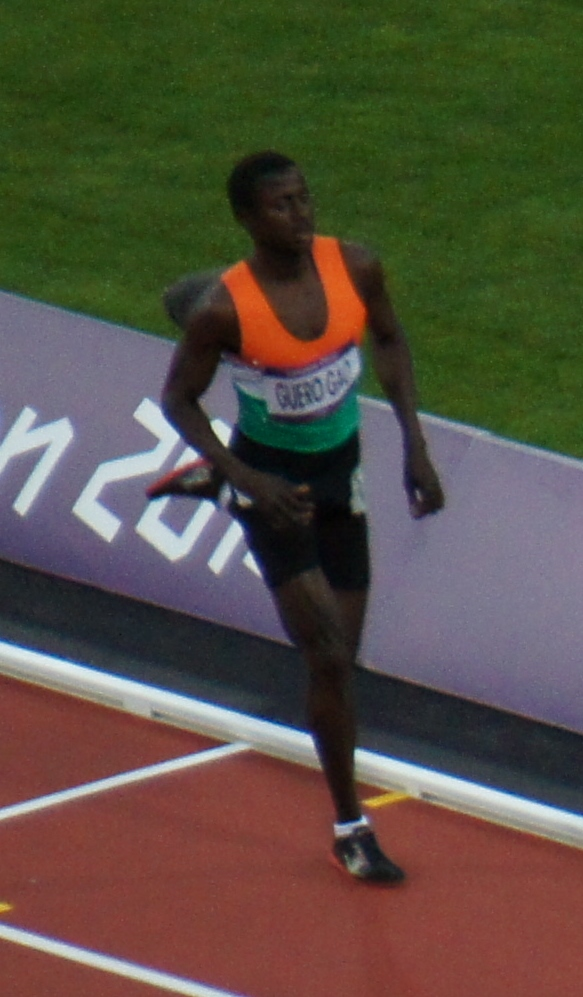
- Guero Gao at the 2012 Summer Olympics

Personal information
- Born: February 1, 1988 (age 38) Saourin Kaihi, Niger

Sport
- Country: Niger
- Sport: Track
- Event: 1500 metres

Achievements and titles
- Personal bests: 800 metres: 1:58.47; 1500 metres: 4:05.46

Rabiou Guero Gao (born 1 February 1988) is a Nigerien runner who has specialized in various middle-distance and long-distance disciplines. He represented Niger at the 2012 Summer Olympics.

== Running career ==
Guero Gao grew up in the Dosso area of Niger, where he was a recognized long-distance runner. He moved to France to continue training athletics in an Olympic-prep program he was selected for by Niger's Athletic Federation, as he was a favorite to break Niger's 1500-m national record set by Amadou Dogo in 2008. He competed in highly-varying disciplines from the 800 metres to even 10-km road races with athletic club Stade Sottevillais 76 in Sotteville-lès-Rouen. On March 11, 2012, Guero Gao finished a 10k run by the Seine, recording a time of 32:30 (min:sec). He competed in the men's 1500 metres at the 2012 Summer Olympics. He failed to qualify for the semifinals after not finishing in the top 6 in his heat of round 1. After staying in contact with the lead pack through roughly 500 meters, he faded, but finished strong in 4:05.46, just behind Guinea's Mamadou Barry.

== See also ==
- Niger at the 2012 Summer Olympics
