= Mariama Souley Bana =

Nigerien swimmer (born 1987)

Personal information
- Born: January 21, 1987 (age 39)

Sport
- Sport: Swimming

Mariama Souley Bana (born 21 January 1987) is a Nigerien female swimmer. Bana competed for Niger at the 2008 Summer Olympics in Swimming. She finished in the 8th and final place in heat two in the Women's 50 metre freestyle.

With a time of 40.83 seconds, she is the national record holder in the 50 metre freestyle.

She also competed at other competitions, including the 2011 Summer Olympiad in China.
