= Víctor Aspillaga =

Peruvian rower (born 1985)

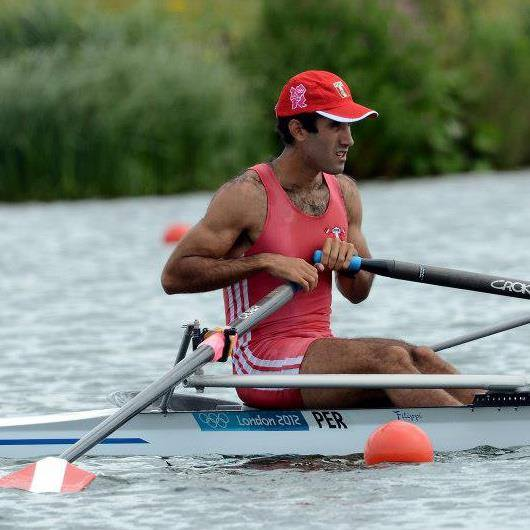
- Aspillaga in London, 2012

Personal information
- Born: 2 July 1985 (age 40) Lima, Peru

Sport
- Sport: Rowing

Víctor Aspillaga (born 2 July 1985) is a Peruvian rower. He competed in the men's single sculls event at the 2012 Summer Olympics.
