= Niger at the 2024 World Aquatics Championships =

- Flag of Niger
- FINA code: NIG
- National federation: Fédération Nigérienne des Sports Nautiques

in Doha, Qatar
- Competitors: 2 in 1 sport
- Medals: Gold 0 Silver 0 Bronze 0 Total 0

World Aquatics Championships appearances
- 1973; 1975; 1978; 1982; 1986; 1991; 1994; 1998; 2001; 2003; 2005; 2007; 2009; 2011; 2013; 2015; 2017; 2019; 2022; 2023; 2024

Niger competed at the 2024 World Aquatics Championships in Doha, Qatar from 2 to 18 February.

== Competitors ==
The following is the list of competitors in the Championships.

Sport	Men	Women	Total
Swimming	1	1	2
Total	1	1	2

== Swimming ==
Niger entered 2 swimmers.

Men

Athlete	Event	Heat		Semifinal		Final	
Athlete	Event	Time	Rank	Time	Rank	Time	Rank
Marouane Mamane	50 metre freestyle	Disqualified		Did not advance			
Marouane Mamane	100 metre freestyle	1:15.54	108	Did not advance			

Women

Athlete	Event	Heat		Semifinal		Final	
Athlete	Event	Time	Rank	Time	Rank	Time	Rank
Salima Ahmadou Youssoufou	50 metre freestyle	34.88	104	Did not advance			
Salima Ahmadou Youssoufou	100 metre freestyle	1:18.69	83	Did not advance			
