= James Fraser-Mackenzie =

Zimbabwean rower (born 1993)

Personal information
- Full name: James Anthony Fraser-Mackenzie
- Nationality: Zimbabwe
- Born: 17 May 1993 (age 33)
- Height: 1.85 m (6 ft 1 in)
- Weight: 80 kg (180 lb)

Sport
- Sport: Rowing
- Event: Single sculls
- Club: Leander Club, Oxford Boat Club
- Coached by: Geoff Baker (club)

James Fraser-Mackenzie (born 17 May 1993) is a Zimbabwean rower who competes primarily in the single sculls. Born in Harare, Zimbabwe, Fraser-Mackenzie began his sporting career as a middle-distance runner, and won junior cross-country events before developing a stronger passion for rowing. He was previously a member of the St. George's College Boat Club, and trained at the Leander Club in Remenham.

== Rowing career ==
In 2009, at age 16, Fraser-Mackenzie represented Zimbabwe at the World Rowing Junior Championships in Brive-la-Gaillarde, France, and competing with his partner Stephen Cox in the men's double sculls. He and Cox finished only twentieth overall, but were able to set a national record with a time of 6 minutes and 51 seconds. The following year, Fraser-Mackenzie competed once again at the 2010 World Rowing Junior Championships in Račice, and served as captain of Zimbabwe’s national rowing team. He also participated in the 2011 South African Junior Championships, where he took two gold medals for both the single and double sculls. Fraser-Mackenzie continued to improve his personal best of 7 minutes and 2 seconds, by competing for his final year at the 2011 World Rowing Junior Championships in Eton Dorney, where he placed eighth overall in the men's single sculls.

== Olympics ==
=== 2012 Summer Olympics ===
Fraser-Mackenzie made his debut at the 2012 Summer Olympics in London, after finishing second at the 2011 African Olympic Qualifying Regatta in Alexandria, Egypt. He was also one of the seven athletes who competed for the Zimbabwe team at these Olympic games, including swimmer and multiple medalist Kirsty Coventry.

At the Olympics, Fraser-Mackenzie finished penultimate in heat three of the men's single sculls at a time of 7:16.83, and thereby relegated to the repechage round, where he would be given a second chance to qualify for the semi-finals, and hopefully win an Olympic medal. However, he finished only in fourth place at a time of 7:19.85, which automatically placed him for the non-medal semifinal rounds (group E/F). He progressed into the final E round after finishing third at the semifinal rounds for groups E. In the end, Fraser-Mackenzie came last in the non-medal Final E round with a time of 7:46.49, and finished 30th overall in the men's single sculls.

== Personal life ==
Fraser-Mackenzie studied engineering at Oxford University, and trained with Oxford University Boat Club and Trinity College Boat Club.
