= Niger at the 2011 World Aquatics Championships =

- Flag of Niger
- FINA code: NIG
- National federation: Federation Nigerienne des Sport Nautiques

in Shanghai, China
- Competitors: 3 in 1 sport
- Medals: Gold 0 Silver 0 Bronze 0 Total 0

World Aquatics Championships appearances
- 1973; 1975; 1978; 1982; 1986; 1991; 1994; 1998; 2001; 2003; 2005; 2007; 2009; 2011; 2013; 2015; 2017; 2019; 2022; 2023; 2024

Niger competed at the 2011 World Aquatics Championships in Shanghai, China between July 16 and 31, 2011.

== Swimming ==
Niger qualified 3 swimmers.

Men

Athlete	Event	Heats		Semifinals		Final	
Athlete	Event	Time	Rank	Time	Rank	Time	Rank
Mohamed Mamaiv Sani	Men's 50m Freestyle	33.37	112	did not advance			
Mohamed Mamaiv Sani	Men's 50m Breaststroke	41.86	48	did not advance			
Razak Marafa	Men's 50m Freestyle	33.83	113	did not advance			
Razak Marafa	Men's 50m Breaststroke	47.58	50	did not advance			

Women

Athlete	Event	Heats		Semifinals		Final	
Athlete	Event	Time	Rank	Time	Rank	Time	Rank
Nafissa Adamou	Women's 50m Freestyle	43.36	84	did not advance			
Nafissa Adamou	Women's 50m Breaststroke	51.24	34	did not advance			
