= Henrik Stephansen =

Danish rower (born 1988)

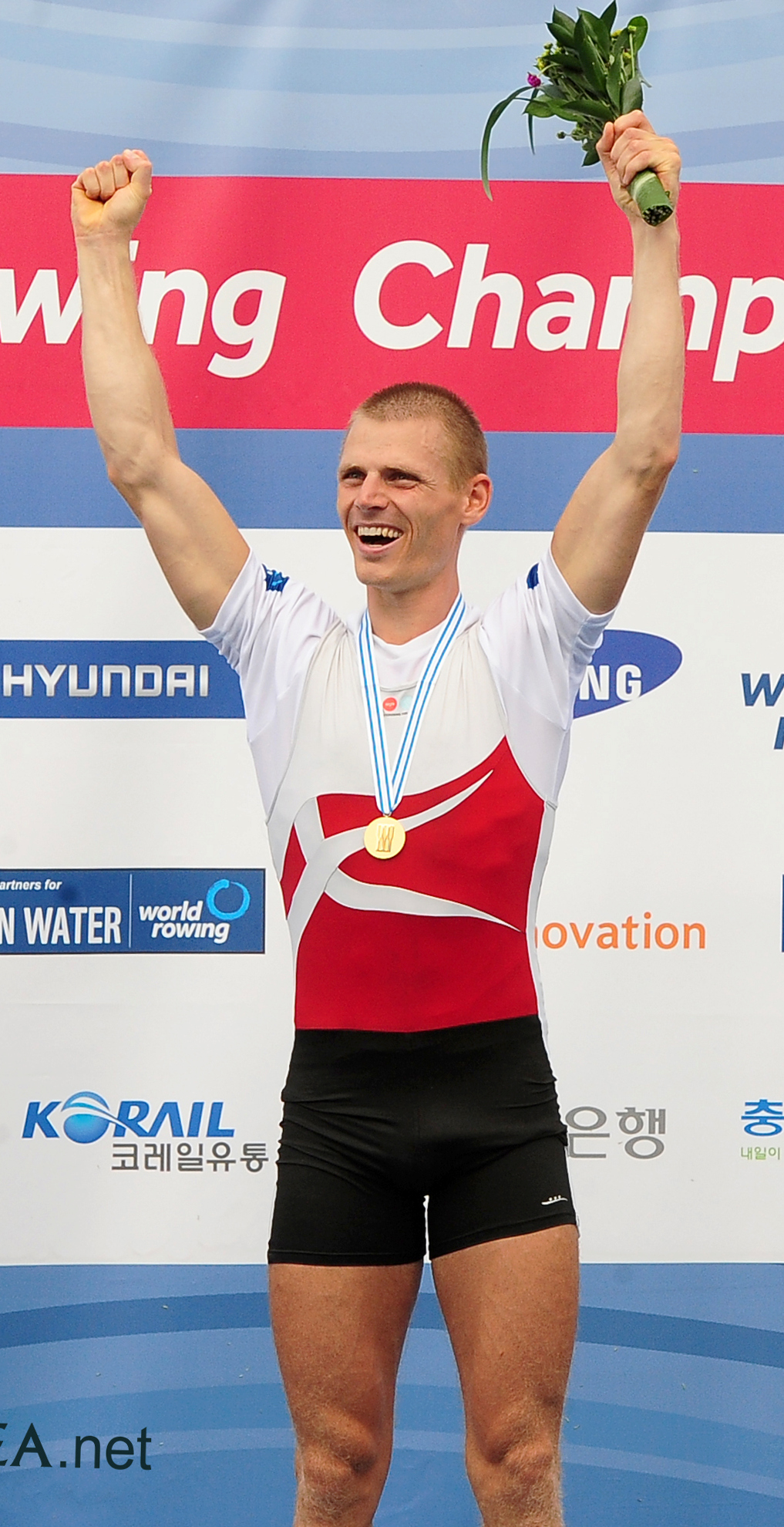
- Stephansen at the 2013 World Championships

Personal information
- Born: 6 August 1988 (age 38) Copenhagen, Denmark
- Height: 182 cm (6 ft 0 in)
- Weight: 78 kg (172 lb)

Sport
- Sport: Rowing
- Club: Furesø RK
Medal record
Representing Denmark
World Championships
| Gold medal – first place | 2011 Lake Bled | LM1x |
| Gold medal – first place | 2012 Plovdiv | LM1x |
| Gold medal – first place | 2013 Chungju | LM1x |

Henrik Victor Stephansen (born 6 August 1988) is a Danish rower who competed in single sculls. He won the world title in lightweight category in 2011, 2012 and 2013 and placed 13th at the 2012 Olympics. He also won the European title in the men's lightweight single scull in 2013. He holds the world lightweight 2000 m record in indoor rowing and was also the first man in the lightweight category to go under 6 minutes for 2000 m.
