= Marc Rojas =

Dominican Republic swimmer (born 1994)

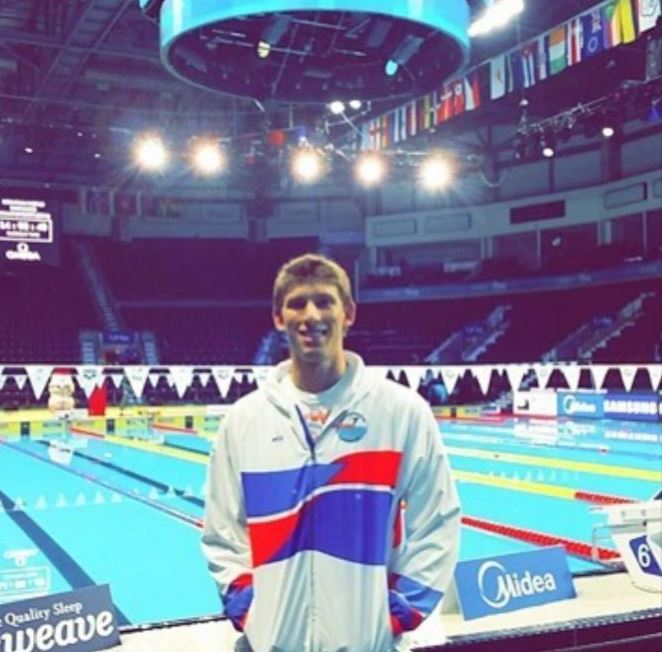

Personal information
- Nationality: Dominican
- Born: 16 February 1994 (age 32)

Sport
- Sport: Swimming
- Strokes: Breaststroke

Marc Rojas (born 16 February 1994) is a Dominican Republic swimmer. He competed in the men's 50 metre breaststroke event at the 2017 World Aquatics Championships.
