= Harouna Garba =

Nigerien hurdler (born 1986)

Harouna Garba (born October 23, 1986) is a Nigerien track hurdler. Garba represented Niger at the 2008 Summer Olympics in Beijing, where he competed for the men's 400 m hurdles. He ran in the first heat against six other athletes, including Bershawn Jackson of the United States, who eventually won in this heat. He finished the race in last place by six seconds behind Portugal's Edivaldo Monteiro, with his personal best time of 55.14. Garba, however, failed to advance into the semi-finals, as he placed twenty-fifth overall, and ranked below three mandatory slots for the next round.
