= Rachidatou Seini Maikido =

Nigerien sprinter (born 1988)

Rachidatou Seini Maikido (born September 18, 1988) is a Nigerien track and field athlete, who specialized in the 400 metres. Seini Maikido represented Niger at the 2008 Summer Olympics in Beijing, where she competed for the women's 400 metres. She ran in the third heat of the first preliminary round, finishing the race in last place. She also set both her personal best and a national record of 1:03.19, being one of two athletes who completed the heat after a minute. Seini Maikido, however, failed to advance into the semi-finals, as she placed forty-ninth overall, and ranked below three mandatory slots for the next round.
