= Mohamed Alhousseini Alhassan =

Nigerien swimmer (born 1978)

Personal information
- Born: July 22, 1978 (age 48)

Sport
- Sport: Swimming

Mohamed Lamine Alhousseini Alhassan (born July 22, 1978) is a Nigerien swimmer. He competed at the 2008 Summer Olympics in the Men’s 50m Freestyle event. He placed number 4 in the second heat of the first round with a time of 30.90 seconds and placed 95 overall. He was the flag bearer for Niger in the 2008 opening ceremony.
