= Nafissa Souleymane =

Nigerien sprinter (born 1992)

Nafissa Souleymane (born November 18, 1992, in Tahoua) is a Nigerien sprinter. She competed in the 100 metres competition at the 2012 Summer Olympics; she ran the preliminaries in 12.81 seconds, which did not qualify her for Round 1.
