= Kadidjatou Amadou =

Nigerien disability activist and social entrepreneur

- Born: 11 September 1984 (age 40)
- Occupation(s): Disability rights activist, entrepreneur and para-athlete
- Organization: National Association of People with Disabilities (ANHL)
- Children: 4

Kadidjatou Amadou Salifou (born 11 September 1984) is a Nigerien disability rights activist, social entrepreneur and para-athlete.

== Biography ==
Amadou was born on 11 September 1984 and contracted polio when she was aged 2, leading to the loss of the use of her legs. She was treated at the National Hospital in Niamey and at a hospital in Lomé, Togo. She dropped out of school aged 15 and supported herself by sewing, later opening her own workshop and training other people with disabilities for free.

During the COVID-19 pandemic, Amadou joined a group of Nigerien tailors in the ICRC Career Development Programme (CDP). Amadou is the representative of disabled people on the Consultative Council for Refoundation (CCR) and is president of the National Association of People with Disabilities (ANHL) in Niger. She is also a member of the National Association of Locomotor Disabled People.

Amadou has also competed in international sporting events in disciplines including weightlifting, javelin throwing and wheelchair racing. She has competed at the African Games, winning three medals at the 2003 All-Africa Games in Abuja, Nigeria, including winning the gold medal in weightlifting. She also competed in the F54/55/56 javelin throwing event at the 2012 Summer Paralympics in London, England, becoming the first female athlete with polio to represent Niger at any Paralympic Games.
