= Mamane Sani Ali =

Nigerien athlete (born 1968)

Personal information
- Nationality: Nigerien
- Born: 14 December 1968 (age 57)

Sport
- Sport: Sprinting
- Event: 100 metres

Mamane Sani Ali (born 14 December 1968) is a Nigerien sprinter. He competed in the men's 100 metres at the 2000 Summer Olympics.
