= Albachir Mouctar =

Nigerien swimmer (born 1996)

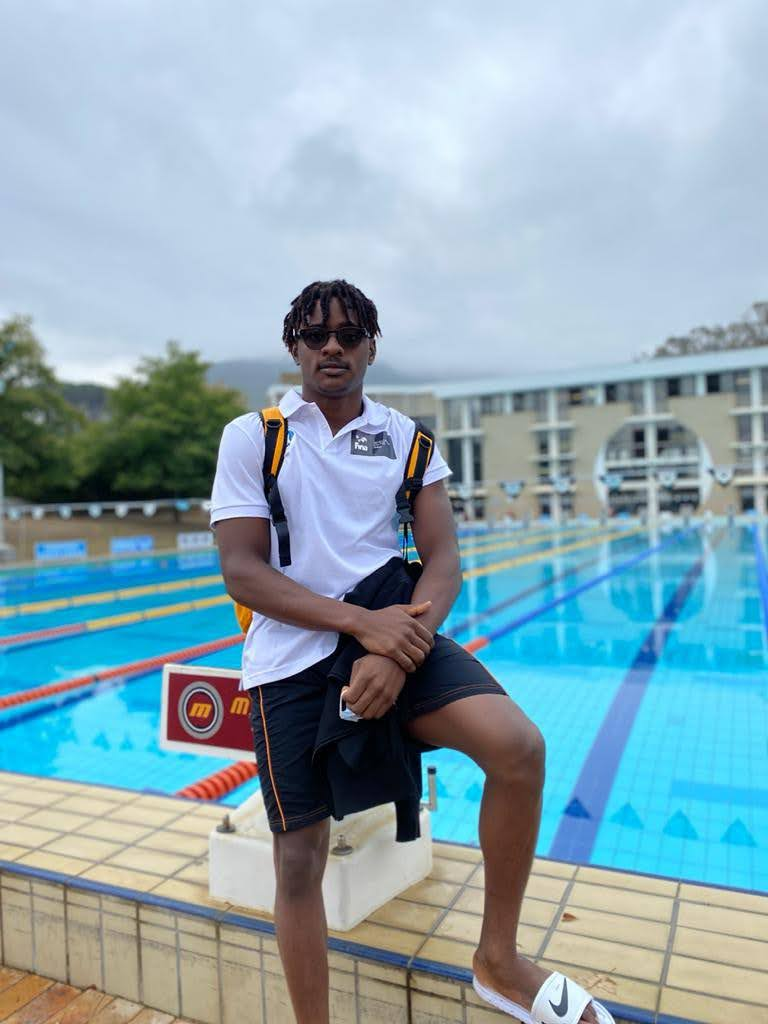
- Albachir in 2021 in South Africa

Personal information
- Nationality: Nigerien
- Born: 1 May 1996 (age 28)
- Height: 1.78 m (5 ft 10 in)
- Weight: 76 kg (168 lb)

Sport
- Country: Niger
- Sport: Swimming

Albachir Mouctar (born 1 May 1996) is a Nigerien Olympic swimmer. He represented his country at the 2016 Summer Olympics in the Men's 50 metre freestyle event where he ranked at 70th with a time of 26.56 seconds, a national record. He did not advance to the semifinals.

Albachir also holds the Nigerien national record in men's 50 metre breaststroke.

In 2019, he represented Niger at the 2019 African Games held in Rabat, Morocco.
