= Abdoul Razak Issoufou =

Nigerien taekwondo athlete

Razak Alfaga
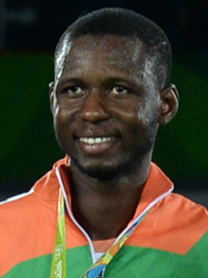
- Issoufou Alfaga at the 2016 Summer Olympics

Personal information
- Full name: Abdoul Razak Issoufou Alfaga
- Nationality: Nigerien
- Born: 26 December 1994 (age 31) Niger
- Height: 207 cm (6 ft 9 in)
- Weight: 98 kg (216 lb)
Medal record
Men's taekwondo
Representing Niger
Olympic Games
Silver medal – second place	2016 Rio de Janeiro	+80 kg
World Championships
Gold medal – first place	2017 Muju	+87 kg
African Championships
Gold medal – first place	2021 Dakar	+87 kg
African Games
Gold medal – first place	2015 Brazzaville	+87 kg
Gold medal – first place	2019 Rabat	+87 kg
Gold medal – first place	2023 Accra	+87 kg

Abdoul Razak Issoufou Alfaga (born 26 December 1994), also known as Razak Alfaga, is a Nigerien taekwondo athlete.

When Issoufou was 7, his father forbade him from taking taekwondo after a cousin died from an injury in a fight. After Issoufou moved to an uncle's home in Togo four years later, he eventually got back into the sport by borrowing a friend's dobok. Eventually Issufou managed to get the support from the International Olympic Committee and train outside Africa, moving to the Taekwondo Competence Center in Friedrichshafen, Germany.

A gold medalist at the 2015 African Games, Issoufou later got the silver in the African Olympic Qualifiers, enabling him to represent Niger at the 2016 Summer Olympics in Rio de Janeiro. He was chosen to be the Nigerien flagbearer at the Parade of Nations.

During the taekwondo tournament, Issoufou got to the finals, making him Niger's first medallist since Issake Dabore in the 1972 Summer Olympics. Despite losing the gold to Radik Isayev of Azerbaijan, Issoufou's silver medal was the best result ever by a Nigerien at the Olympic Games. He was the flag bearer for Niger during the closing ceremony.

At the 2021 African Taekwondo Championships held in Dakar, Senegal, he won the men's +87 kg event gold medal.

He competed in the men's +80 kg event at the 2020 Summer Olympics.

Olympic Games
Preceded by Moustapha Abdoulaye Hima	Flagbearer for Niger; Rio de Janeiro 2016 Tokyo 2020 with Roukaya Mahamane; Paris 2024 with Samira Awali Boubacar	Succeeded by Incumbent
