= Roukaya Mahamane =

Nigerien swimmer (born 1997)

Personal information
- Full name: Roukaya Moussa Mahamane
- Nationality: Nigerien
- Born: 13 January 1997 (age 29) Niamey, Niger

Sport
- Sport: Swimming

Roukaya Moussa Mahamane (born 13 January 1997 in Niamey) is a Nigerien swimmer. She competed in the women's 50 metre freestyle event at the 2016 Summer Olympics, where she ranked 83rd with a time of 36.50 seconds, a national record. She did not advance to the semifinals.

In 2019, she represented Niger at the World Aquatics Championships held in Gwangju, South Korea. She competed in the women's 50 metre freestyle and women's 100 metre freestyle events. In both events she did not advance to compete in the semi-finals.

She competed in the women's 50 metre freestyle event at the 2020 Summer Olympics.

She represented Niger at the 2022 World Aquatics Championships held in Budapest, Hungary. She competed in the women's 50 metre freestyle and women's 100 metre freestyle events.

Olympic Games
Preceded by Abdoul Razak Issoufou	Flag bearer for Niger; Tokyo 2020 with Abdoul Razak Issoufou	Succeeded by Samira Awali Boubacar; Abdoul Razak Issoufou
