= Abdou Manzo =

Nigerien long-distance runner (born 1959)

Personal information
- Nationality: Nigerien
- Born: 1959 (age 65–66)

Sport
- Sport: Long-distance running
- Event: Marathon

Abdou Manzo (born 1959), also spelled Abdou Monzo, is a Nigerien long-distance runner. He competed in the men's marathon at the 1988, 1992 and the 1996 Summer Olympics.

His time of 2:25:05 in 1988 still stands as the Nigerien national record in the marathon.

Manzo was the flagbearer for Niger at the 1996 Olympics.

In 2009, Manzo attended an event as a "former glory of Nigerien athletics" to honor the death of SE M.Adamou Djermakoye.
