= Alassane Seydou =

Nigerien swimmer (born 1993)

Personal information
- Nationality: Nigerien
- Born: 9 September 1993 (age 31)

Sport
- Sport: Swimming

Alassane Seydou Lancina (born 9 September 1993) is a Nigerien swimmer. He competed in the men's 50 metre freestyle at the 2020 Summer Olympics.
