= Nigerien Olympic and National Sports Committee =

National Olympic Committee

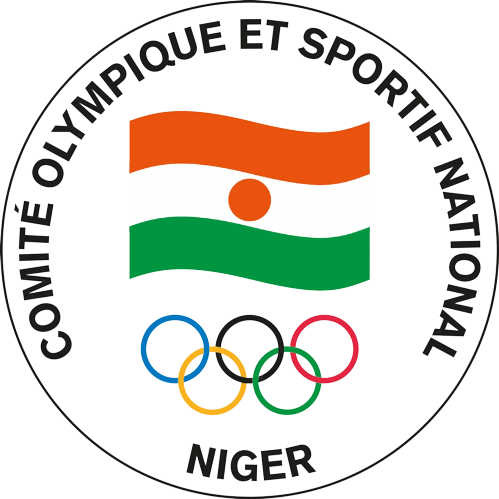
- Country: Niger
- Code: NIG
- Created: 1964
- Recognized: 1964
- Headquarters: Niamey
- President: Issaka Ide (since 2014)
- Secretary General: Youssoufou Tidjani

The Nigerien Olympic and National Sports Committee (French: Comité Olympique et Sportif National du Niger, COSNI) is the National Olympic Committee representing Niger. From 2014 on, its president is Issaka Idé. A member of the Association of National Olympic Committees of Africa, the Niger committee was founded in 1964.

== See also ==
- Niger at the Olympics
