= Chronological summary of the 2020 Summer Olympics =

This is a chronological summary of the major events of the 2020 Summer Olympics in Tokyo, Japan, which was postponed to 2021 due to the COVID-19 pandemic. The first matches in the group stages of the football and softball events was held on 21 July. The opening ceremony was scheduled two days later on 23 July. The last day of competition and the closing ceremony was on 8 August. However, the Games was referred to by its original date in all scheduled events in order to avoid confusion in future years. With the area under a state of emergency because of the pandemic, the Games were held largely behind closed doors with no spectators permitted.

The games featured 339 events in 33 different sports, encompassing a total of 50 disciplines. The 2020 Games saw the introduction of new competitions including 3x3 basketball, freestyle BMX, and madison cycling, in the latter case for women (the men's version was held between 2000 and 2008 before returning in these games), as well as further mixed events. These Games also saw karate, sport climbing, surfing, and skateboarding make their Olympic debuts, as well as the return of baseball and softball for the first time since 2008.

About 206 teams were expected to participate. This was the first Olympics since the June 2018 signing of the Prespa agreement between Greece and the Republic of Macedonia over the "Macedonia" naming dispute, resulting in the latter officially being renamed North Macedonia. This was also the second consecutive Summer Olympics that selected independent Olympic participants to compete under the Olympic Flag as part of the "Refugee Olympic Team". As a result of the 2020 ruling by the Court of Arbitration for Sport on the Russian doping scandal, Russian athletes competed under the acronym "ROC" after the name of the Russian Olympic Committee, and under the flag of the Russian Olympic Committee.

== Calendar ==
The 2020 schedule by session was approved by the IOC Executive Board on 18 July 2018, with the exception of swimming, diving, and artistic swimming. A more detailed schedule by event was released on 16 April 2019, still omitting a detailed schedule for the boxing events. A detailed boxing schedule was released in late 2019.

The original schedule was from 22 July to 9 August 2020. To postpone the Olympics until 2021, all events were delayed by 364 days (one day less than a full year to preserve the same days of the week), giving a new schedule of 21 July to 8 August 2021.

All times and dates use Japan Standard Time (UTC+9)

OC	Opening ceremony	●	Event competitions	1	Gold medal events	CC	Closing ceremony

July/August 2021		July											August								Events
July/August 2021		21st Wed	22nd Thu	23rd Fri	24th Sat	25th Sun	26th Mon	27th Tue	28th Wed	29th Thu	30th Fri	31st Sat	1st Sun	2nd Mon	3rd Tue	4th Wed	5th Thu	6th Fri	7th Sat	8th Sun	Events
Ceremonies				OC																CC	—N/a
Aquatics	Artistic swimming													●	●	1		●	1		49
Aquatics	Diving					1	1	1	1		●	●	1	●	1	●	1	●	1		49
Aquatics	Marathon swimming															1	1				49
Aquatics	Swimming				●	4	4	4	5	5	4	4	5								49
Aquatics	Water polo				●	●	●	●	●	●	●	●	●	●	●	●	●	●	1	1	49
Archery				●	1	1	1	●	●	●	1	1									5
Athletics											1	3	4	5	6	5	8	8	7	1	48
Badminton					●	●	●	●	●	●	1	1	1	2							5
Baseball/Softball
Baseball/Softball	Baseball								●	●	●	●	●	●	●	●	●		1		1
Baseball/Softball	Softball	●	●		●	●	●	1													1
Basketball	Basketball					●	●	●	●	●	●	●	●	●	●	●	●	●	1	1	4
Basketball	3×3 Basketball				●	●	●	●	2												4
Boxing					●	●	●	●	●	●	●	●	●		2	1	1	1	4	4	13
Canoeing	Slalom					●	1	1	●	1	1										16
Canoeing	Sprint													●	4	●	4	●	4		16
Cycling	Road cycling				1	1			2												22
Cycling	Track cycling													1	2	1	2	2	1	3	22
Cycling	BMX									●	2	●	2								22
Cycling	Mountain biking						1	1													22
Equestrian					●	●		1	1		●	●	●	2	●	1		●	1		6
Fencing					2	2	2	1	1	1	1	1	1								12
Field hockey					●	●	●	●	●	●	●	●	●	●	●	●	1	1			2
Football		●	●		●	●		●	●		●	●		●	●		●	1	1		2
Golf										●	●	●	1			●	●	●	1		2
Gymnastics	Artistic				●	●	1	1	1	1			4	3	3						18
Gymnastics	Rhythmic																	●	1	1	18
Gymnastics	Trampolining										1	1									18
Handball					●	●	●	●	●	●	●	●	●	●	●	●	●	●	1	1	2
Judo					2	2	2	2	2	2	2	1									15
Karate																	3	3	2		8
Modern pentathlon																	●	1	1		2
Rowing				●	●	●			6	4	4										14
Rugby sevens							●	●	1	●	●	1									2
Sailing						●	●	●	●	●	●	2	2		4	2					10
Shooting					2	2	2	2	●	2	1	2	●	2							15
Skateboarding						1	1									1	1				4
Sport climbing															●	●	1	1			2
Surfing						●	●	2													2
Table tennis					●	●	1	●	●	1	1		●	●	●	●	1	1			5
Taekwondo					2	2	2	2													8
Tennis					●	●	●	●	●	●	1	1	3								5
Triathlon							1	1				1									3
Volleyball	Beach volleyball				●	●	●	●	●	●	●	●	●	●	●	●	●	1	1		4
Volleyball	Volleyball				●	●	●	●	●	●	●	●	●	●	●	●	●	●	1	1	4
Weightlifting					1	2	1	2	1			2	1	2	1	1					14
Wrestling													●	3	3	3	3	3	3		18
Daily medal events					11	18	21	22	23	17	21	21	25	20	26	17	27	23	34	13	339
Cumulative total					11	29	50	72	95	112	133	154	179	199	225	242	269	292	326	339	339
July/August 2021		21st Wed	22nd Thu	23rd Fri	24th Sat	25th Sun	26th Mon	27th Tue	28th Wed	29th Thu	30th Fri	31st Sat	1st Sun	2nd Mon	3rd Tue	4th Wed	5th Thu	6th Fri	7th Sat	8th Sun	Total events
July/August 2021		July											August								Total events

== Day-by-day summaries ==
=== 21 July ===
Football

- The first matches in the group stage of the women's tournament were played.

Softball

- Group stage begins.

=== 22 July ===
Football

- The first matches in the group stage of the Men's tournament were played.

Softball

- Second day of the group stages.

=== 23 July ===
Archery

- The ranking round in both the men's individual competition and the women's individual competition took place.

Rowing

- The heats in the men's single sculls, women's single sculls, men's double sculls, women's double sculls, men's quadruple sculls and women's quadruple sculls took place.

Opening ceremony

- The opening ceremony was held at Japan National Stadium at 20:00 JST (UTC+9).

=== Day 1: 24 July ===
Sport	Event	Gold medalist(s)			Silver medalist(s)		Bronze medalist(s)		Ref
Sport	Event	Competitor(s)	Team	Rec	Competitor(s)	Team	Competitor(s)	Team	Ref
Archery	Mixed team	Kim Je-deok; An San	South Korea		Steve Wijler; Gabriela Schloesser	Netherlands	Luis Álvarez; Alejandra Valencia	Mexico	
Cycling	Men's road race	Richard Carapaz	Ecuador		Wout Van Aert	Belgium	Tadej Pogačar	Slovenia	
Fencing	Men's sabre	Áron Szilágyi	Hungary		Luigi Samele	Italy	Kim Jung-hwan	South Korea	
Fencing	Women's épée	Sun Yiwen	China		Ana Maria Popescu	Romania	Katrina Lehis	Estonia	
Judo	Men's 60kg	Naohisa Takato	Japan		Yang Yung-wei	Chinese Taipei	Luka Mkheidze	France	
Judo	Men's 60kg	Naohisa Takato	Japan		Yang Yung-wei	Chinese Taipei	Yeldos Smetov	Kazakhstan	
Judo	Women's 48kg	Distria Krasniqi	Kosovo		Funa Tonaki	Japan	Mönkhbatyn Urantsetseg	Mongolia	
Judo	Women's 48kg	Distria Krasniqi	Kosovo		Funa Tonaki	Japan	Daria Bilodid	Ukraine	
Shooting	Men's 10m air pistol	Javad Foroughi	Iran	OR	Damir Mikec	Serbia	Pang Wei	China	
Shooting	Women's 10m air rifle	Yang Qian	China	OR	Anastasiia Galashina	ROC	Nina Christen	Switzerland	
Taekwondo	Men's 58kg	Vito Dell'Aquila	Italy		Mohamed Khalil Jendoubi	Tunisia	Jang Jun	South Korea	
Taekwondo	Men's 58kg	Vito Dell'Aquila	Italy		Mohamed Khalil Jendoubi	Tunisia	Mikhail Artamonov	ROC	
Taekwondo	Women's 49kg	Panipak Wongpattanakit	Thailand		Adriana Cerezo	Spain	Avishag Semberg	Israel	
Taekwondo	Women's 49kg	Panipak Wongpattanakit	Thailand		Adriana Cerezo	Spain	Tijana Bogdanović	Serbia	
Weightlifting	Women's 49kg	Hou Zhihui	China	OR	Saikhom Mirabai Chanu	India	Windy Cantika Aisah	Indonesia	

=== Day 2: 25 July ===
Sport	Event	Gold medalist(s)			Silver medalist(s)		Bronze medalist(s)		Ref
Sport	Event	Competitor(s)	Team	Rec	Competitor(s)	Team	Competitor(s)	Team	Ref
Archery	Women's team	An San; Jang Min-hee; Kang Chae-young	South Korea		Svetlana Gomboeva; Elena Osipova; Ksenia Perova	ROC	Michelle Kroppen; Charline Schwarz; Lisa Unruh	Germany	
Cycling	Women's road race	Anna Kiesenhofer	Austria		Annemiek van Vleuten	Netherlands	Elisa Longo Borghini	Italy	
Diving	Women's synchronized 3m springboard	Shi Tingmao; Wang Han	China		Jennifer Abel; Melissa Citrini-Beaulieu	Canada	Lena Hentschel; Tina Punzel	Germany	
Fencing	Men's épée	Romain Cannone	France		Gergely Siklósi	Hungary	Ihor Reizlin	Ukraine	
Fencing	Women's foil	Lee Kiefer	United States		Inna Deriglazova	ROC	Larisa Korobeynikova	ROC	
Judo	Men's 66kg	Hifumi Abe	Japan		Vazha Margvelashvili	Georgia	An Baul	South Korea	
Judo	Men's 66kg	Hifumi Abe	Japan		Vazha Margvelashvili	Georgia	Daniel Cargnin	Brazil	
Judo	Women's 52kg	Uta Abe	Japan		Amandine Buchard	France	Odette Giuffrida	Italy	
Judo	Women's 52kg	Uta Abe	Japan		Amandine Buchard	France	Chelsie Giles	Great Britain	
Shooting	Men's 10m air rifle	William Shaner	United States	OR	Sheng Lihao	China	Yang Haoran	China	
Shooting	Women's 10m air pistol	Vitalina Batsarashkina	ROC	OR	Antoaneta Kostadinova	Bulgaria	Jiang Ranxin	China	
Skateboarding	Men's street	Yuto Horigome	Japan		Kelvin Hoefler	Brazil	Jagger Eaton	United States	
Swimming	Men's 400m freestyle	Ahmed Hafnaoui	Tunisia		Jack McLoughlin	Australia	Kieran Smith	United States	
Swimming	Men's 400m individual medley	Chase Kalisz	United States		Jay Litherland	United States	Brendon Smith	Australia	
Swimming	Women's 400m individual medley	Yui Ohashi	Japan		Emma Weyant	United States	Hali Flickinger	United States	
Swimming	Women's 4×100m freestyle relay	Bronte Campbell; Meg Harris; Emma McKeon; Cate Campbell	Australia	WR	Kayla Sanchez; Margaret MacNeil; Rebecca Smith; Penny Oleksiak	Canada	Erika Brown; Abbey Weitzeil; Natalie Hinds; Simone Manuel	United States	
Taekwondo	Men's 68kg	Ulugbek Rashitov	Uzbekistan		Bradly Sinden	Great Britain	Zhao Shuai	China	
Taekwondo	Men's 68kg	Ulugbek Rashitov	Uzbekistan		Bradly Sinden	Great Britain	Hakan Reçber	Turkey	
Taekwondo	Women's 57kg	Anastasija Zolotic	United States		Tatiana Minina	ROC	Lo Chia-ling	Chinese Taipei	
Taekwondo	Women's 57kg	Anastasija Zolotic	United States		Tatiana Minina	ROC	Hatice Kübra İlgün	Turkey	
Weightlifting	Men's 61kg	Li Fabin	China	OR	Eko Yuli Irawan	Indonesia	Igor Son	Kazakhstan	
Weightlifting	Men's 67kg	Chen Lijun	China	OR	Luis Javier Mosquera	Colombia	Mirko Zanni	Italy	

=== Day 3: 26 July ===
Sport	Event	Gold medalist(s)			Silver medalist(s)		Bronze medalist(s)		Ref
Sport	Event	Competitor(s)	Team	Rec	Competitor(s)	Team	Competitor(s)	Team	Ref
Archery	Men's team	Kim Woo-jin; Oh Jin-hyek; Kim Je-deok	South Korea		Deng Yu-cheng; Tang Chih-chun; Wei Chun-heng	Chinese Taipei	Takaharu Furukawa; Yuki Kawata; Hiroki Muto	Japan	
Canoeing	Men's slalom C-1	Benjamin Savšek	Slovenia		Lukáš Rohan	Czech Republic	Sideris Tasiadis	Germany	
Cycling	Men's cross-country	Thomas Pidcock	Great Britain		Mathias Flückiger	Switzerland	David Valero	Spain	
Diving	Men's synchronized 10m platform	Tom Daley; Matty Lee	Great Britain		Cao Yuan; Chen Aisen	China	Aleksandr Bondar; Viktor Minibaev	ROC	
Fencing	Men's foil	Cheung Ka-long	Hong Kong		Daniele Garozzo	Italy	Alexander Choupenitch	Czech Republic	
Fencing	Women's sabre	Sofia Pozdniakova	ROC		Sofya Velikaya	ROC	Manon Brunet	France	
Gymnastics	Men's artistic team all-around	Denis Ablyazin; David Belyavskiy; Artur Dalaloyan; Nikita Nagornyy	ROC		Daiki Hashimoto; Kazuma Kaya; Takeru Kitazono; Wataru Tanigawa	Japan	Lin Chaopan; Sun Wei; Xiao Ruoteng; Zou Jingyuan	China	
Judo	Men's 73kg	Shohei Ono	Japan		Lasha Shavdatuashvili	Georgia	Tsend-Ochiryn Tsogtbaatar	Mongolia	
Judo	Men's 73kg	Shohei Ono	Japan		Lasha Shavdatuashvili	Georgia	An Changrim	South Korea	
Judo	Women's 57kg	Nora Gjakova	Kosovo		Sarah-Léonie Cysique	France	Tsukasa Yoshida	Japan	
Judo	Women's 57kg	Nora Gjakova	Kosovo		Sarah-Léonie Cysique	France	Jessica Klimkait	Canada	
Shooting	Men's skeet	Vincent Hancock	United States	OR	Jesper Hansen	Denmark	Abdullah Al-Rashidi	Kuwait	
Shooting	Women's skeet	Amber English	United States	OR	Diana Bacosi	Italy	Wei Meng	China	
Skateboarding	Women's street	Momiji Nishiya	Japan		Rayssa Leal	Brazil	Funa Nakayama	Japan	
Swimming	Men's 100m breaststroke	Adam Peaty	Great Britain		Arno Kamminga	Netherlands	Nicolò Martinenghi	Italy	
Swimming	Men's 4×100m freestyle relay	Caeleb Dressel; Blake Pieroni; Bowe Becker; Zach Apple	United States		Alessandro Miressi; Thomas Ceccon; Lorenzo Zazzeri; Manuel Frigo	Italy	Matthew Temple; Zac Incerti; Alexander Graham; Kyle Chalmers	Australia	
Swimming	Women's 400m freestyle	Ariarne Titmus	Australia	OC	Katie Ledecky	United States	Li Bingjie	China	
Swimming	Women's 100m butterfly	Maggie MacNeil	Canada	AM	Zhang Yufei	China	Emma McKeon	Australia	
Table tennis	Mixed doubles	Jun Mizutani; Mima Ito	Japan		Xu Xin; Liu Shiwen	China	Lin Yun-ju; Cheng I-ching	Chinese Taipei	
Taekwondo	Men's 80 kg	Maksim Khramtsov	ROC		Saleh El-Sharabaty	Jordan	Toni Kanaet	Croatia	
Taekwondo	Men's 80 kg	Maksim Khramtsov	ROC		Saleh El-Sharabaty	Jordan	Seif Eissa	Egypt	
Taekwondo	Women's 67 kg	Matea Jelić	Croatia		Lauren Williams	Great Britain	Ruth Gbagbi	Ivory Coast	
Taekwondo	Women's 67 kg	Matea Jelić	Croatia		Lauren Williams	Great Britain	Hedaya Malak	Egypt	
Triathlon	Men's	Kristian Blummenfelt	Norway		Alex Yee	Great Britain	Hayden Wilde	New Zealand	
Weightlifting	Women's 55kg	Hidilyn Diaz	Philippines	OR	Liao Qiuyun	China	Zulfiya Chinshanlo	Kazakhstan	

=== Day 4: 27 July ===
Sport	Event	Gold medalist(s)			Silver medalist(s)		Bronze medalist(s)		Ref
Sport	Event	Competitor(s)	Team	Rec	Competitor(s)	Team	Competitor(s)	Team	Ref
Canoeing	Women's slalom K-1	Ricarda Funk	Germany		Maialen Chourraut	Spain	Jessica Fox	Australia	
Cycling	Women's cross-country	Jolanda Neff	Switzerland		Sina Frei	Switzerland	Linda Indergand	Switzerland	
Diving	Women's synchronized 10m platform	Chen Yuxi; Zhang Jiaqi	China		Jessica Parratto; Delaney Schnell	United States	Gabriela Agundez; Alejandra Orozco	Mexico	
Equestrian	Team dressage	Jessica von Bredow-Werndl; Dorothee Schneider; Isabell Werth	Germany		Sabine Schut-Kery; Adrienne Lyle; Steffen Peters	United States	Charlotte Fry; Carl Hester; Charlotte Dujardin	Great Britain	
Fencing	Women's team épée	Julia Beljajeva; Irina Embrich; Erika Kirpu; Katrina Lehis	Estonia		Choi In-jeong; Kang Young-mi; Lee Hye-in; Song Se-ra	South Korea	Rossella Fiamingo; Federica Isola; Mara Navarria; Alberta Santuccio	Italy	
Gymnastics	Women's artistic team all-around	Lilia Akhaimova; Viktoria Listunova; Angelina Melnikova; Vladislava Urazova	ROC		Simone Biles*; Jordan Chiles; Sunisa Lee; Grace McCallum	United States	Jennifer Gadirova; Jessica Gadirova; Alice Kinsella; Amelie Morgan	Great Britain	
Judo	Men's 81kg	Takanori Nagase	Japan		Saeid Mollaei	Mongolia	Shamil Borchashvili	Austria	
Judo	Men's 81kg	Takanori Nagase	Japan		Saeid Mollaei	Mongolia	Matthias Casse	Belgium	
Judo	Women's 63kg	Clarisse Agbegnenou	France		Tina Trstenjak	Slovenia	Maria Centracchio	Italy	
Judo	Women's 63kg	Clarisse Agbegnenou	France		Tina Trstenjak	Slovenia	Catherine Beauchemin-Pinard	Canada	
Shooting	Mixed 10m air rifle team	Yang Qian; Yang Haoran	China		Mary Tucker; Lucas Kozeniesky	United States	Yulia Karimova; Sergey Kamenskiy	ROC	
Shooting	Mixed 10m air pistol team	Jiang Ranxin; Pang Wei	China		Vitalina Batsarashkina; Artem Chernousov	ROC	Olena Kostevych; Oleh Omelchuk	Ukraine	
Softball		Haruka Agatsuma; Mana Atsumi; Yamato Fujita; Nozomi Goto; Nodoka Harada; Yuka Ichiguchi; Hitomi Kawabata; Nayu Kiyohara; Yukiyo Mine; Sayaka Mori; Minori Naito; Yukiko Ueno; Reika Utsugi; Eri Yamada; Yu Yamamoto	Japan		Ali Aguilar; Monica Abbott; Valerie Arioto; Ally Carda; Amanda Chidester; Rachel Garcia; Haylie McCleney; Michelle Moultrie; Dejah Mulipola; Aubree Munro; Bubba Nickles; Cat Osterman; Jeanie Reed; Delaney Spaulding; Kelsey Stewart	United States	Jenna Caira; Emma Entzminger; Larissa Franklin; Jennifer Gilbert; Sara Groenewegen; Kelsey Harshman; Victoria Hayward; Danielle Lawrie; Janet Leung; Joey Lye; Erika Polidori; Kaleigh Rafter; Lauren Regula; Jennifer Salling; Natalie Wideman	Canada	
Surfing	Men's	Ítalo Ferreira	Brazil		Kanoa Igarashi	Japan	Owen Wright	Australia	
Surfing	Women's	Carissa Moore	United States		Bianca Buitendag	South Africa	Amuro Tsuzuki	Japan	
Swimming	Men's 200m freestyle	Thomas Dean	Great Britain		Duncan Scott	Great Britain	Fernando Scheffer	Brazil	
Swimming	Men's 100m backstroke	Evgeny Rylov	ROC	ER	Kliment Kolesnikov	ROC	Ryan Murphy	United States	
Swimming	Women's 100m backstroke	Kaylee McKeown	Australia	OR	Kylie Masse	Canada	Regan Smith	United States	
Swimming	Women's 100m breaststroke	Lydia Jacoby	United States		Tatjana Schoenmaker	South Africa	Lilly King	United States	
Taekwondo	Men's +80kg	Vladislav Larin	ROC		Dejan Georgievski	North Macedonia	In Kyo-don	South Korea	
Taekwondo	Men's +80kg	Vladislav Larin	ROC		Dejan Georgievski	North Macedonia	Rafael Alba	Cuba	
Taekwondo	Women's +67kg	Milica Mandić	Serbia		Lee Da-bin	South Korea	Althéa Laurin	France	
Taekwondo	Women's +67kg	Milica Mandić	Serbia		Lee Da-bin	South Korea	Bianca Walkden	Great Britain	
Triathlon	Women's	Flora Duffy	Bermuda		Georgia Taylor-Brown	Great Britain	Katie Zaferes	United States	
Weightlifting	Women's 59kg	Kuo Hsing-chun	Chinese Taipei	OR	Polina Guryeva	Turkmenistan	Mikiko Ando	Japan	
Weightlifting	Women's 64kg	Maude Charron	Canada		Giorgia Bordignon	Italy	Chen Wen-huei	Chinese Taipei	

*Simone Biles withdrew from the finals.

=== Day 5: 28 July ===
Sport	Event	Gold medalist(s)			Silver medalist(s)		Bronze medalist(s)		Ref
Sport	Event	Competitor(s)	Team	Rec	Competitor(s)	Team	Competitor(s)	Team	Ref
Basketball	Men's 3x3	Agnis Čavars; Edgars Krūmiņš; Kārlis Lasmanis; Nauris Miezis	Latvia		Ilia Karpenkov; Kirill Pisklov; Stanislav Sharov; Alexander Zuev	ROC	Dušan Bulut; Dejan Majstorović; Aleksandar Ratkov; Mihailo Vasić	Serbia	
Basketball	Women's 3x3	Stefanie Dolson; Allisha Gray; Kelsey Plum; Jackie Young	United States		Evgeniia Frolkina; Olga Frolkina; Yulia Kozik; Anastasia Logunova	ROC	Wan Jiyuan; Wang Lili; Yang Shuyu; Zhang Zhiting	China	
Cycling	Men's road time trial	Primož Roglič	Slovenia		Tom Dumoulin	Netherlands	Rohan Dennis	Australia	
Cycling	Women's road time trial	Annemiek van Vleuten	Netherlands		Marlen Reusser	Switzerland	Anna van der Breggen	Netherlands	
Diving	Men's synchronized 3m springboard	Wang Zongyuan; Xie Siyi	China		Andrew Capobianco; Michael Hixon	United States	Patrick Hausding; Lars Rüdiger	Germany	
Equestrian	Individual dressage	Jessica von Bredow-Werndl	Germany		Isabell Werth	Germany	Charlotte Dujardin	Great Britain	
Fencing	Men's team sabre	Oh Sang-uk; Kim Jun-ho; Kim Jung-hwan; Gu Bon-gil	South Korea		Luca Curatoli; Luigi Samele; Enrico Berrè; Aldo Montano	Italy	Áron Szilágyi; András Szatmári; Tamás Decsi; Csanád Gémesi	Hungary	
Gymnastics	Men's artistic individual all-around	Daiki Hashimoto	Japan		Xiao Ruoteng	China	Nikita Nagornyy	ROC	
Judo	Men's 90kg	Lasha Bekauri	Georgia		Eduard Trippel	Germany	Davlat Bobonov	Uzbekistan	
Judo	Men's 90kg	Lasha Bekauri	Georgia		Eduard Trippel	Germany	Krisztián Tóth	Hungary	
Judo	Women's 70kg	Chizuru Arai	Japan		Michaela Polleres	Austria	Madina Taimazova	ROC	
Judo	Women's 70kg	Chizuru Arai	Japan		Michaela Polleres	Austria	Sanne van Dijke	Netherlands	
Rowing	Men's double sculls	Hugo Boucheron; Matthieu Androdias	France		Melvin Twellaar; Stef Broenink	Netherlands	Liu Zhiyu; Zhang Liang	China	
Rowing	Men's coxless four	Alexander Purnell; Spencer Turrin; Jack Hargreaves; Alexander Hill	Australia		Mihăiță Vasile Țigănescu; Mugurel Semciuc; Ștefan Constantin Berariu; Cosmin Pascari	Romania	Matteo Castaldo; Matteo Lodo; Giuseppe Vicino; Marco Di Costanzo	Italy	
Rowing	Men's quadruple sculls	Dirk Uittenbogaard; Abe Wiersma; Tone Wieten; Koen Metsemakers	Netherlands		Harry Leask; Angus Groom; Tom Barras; Jack Beaumont	Great Britain	Jack Cleary; Caleb Antill; Cameron Girdlestone; Luke Letcher	Australia	
Rowing	Women's double sculls	Nicoleta-Ancuța Bodnar; Simona Radiș	Romania		Brooke Donoghue; Hannah Osborne	New Zealand	Roos de Jong; Lisa Scheenaard	Netherlands	
Rowing	Women's coxless four	Lucy Stephan; Rosemary Popa; Jessica Morrison; Annabelle McIntyre	Australia		Ellen Hogerwerf; Karolien Florijn; Ymkje Clevering; Veronique Meester	Netherlands	Aifric Keogh; Eimear Lambe; Fiona Murtagh; Emily Hegarty	Ireland	
Rowing	Women's quadruple sculls	Chen Yunxia; Zhang Ling; Lü Yang; Cui Xiaotong	China		Agnieszka Kobus; Marta Wieliczko; Maria Sajdak; Katarzyna Zillmann	Poland	Ria Thompson; Rowena Meredith; Harriet Hudson; Caitlin Cronin	Australia	
Rugby sevens	Men's	Napolioni Bolaca; Vilimoni Botitu; Meli Derenalagi; Sireli Maqala; Iosefo Masi; Waisea Nacuqu; Kalione Nasoko; Semi Radradra; Aminiasi Tuimaba; Asaeli Tuivuaka; Jerry Tuwai; Josua Vakurunabili; Jiuta Wainiqolo	Fiji		Kurt Baker; Dylan Collier; Scott Curry; Sam Dickson; Andrew Knewstubb; Ngarohi McGarvey-Black; Tim Mikkelson; Sione Molia; Etene Nanai-Seturo; Amanaki Nicole; Tone Ng Shiu; William Warbrick; Regan Ware; Joe Webber	New Zealand	Santiago Álvarez; Lautaro Bazán; Lucio Cinti; Felipe del Mestre; Luciano González; Rodrigo Isgro; Santiago Mare; Ignacio Mendy; Marcos Moneta; Matías Osadczuk; Gastón Revol; Germán Schulz	Argentina	
Swimming	Men's 200m butterfly	Kristóf Milák	Hungary	OR	Tomoru Honda	Japan	Federico Burdisso	Italy	
Swimming	Men's 4×200m freestyle relay	Thomas Dean; James Guy; Matthew Richards; Duncan Scott	Great Britain	ER	Martin Malyutin; Ivan Girev; Evgeny Rylov; Mikhail Dovgalyuk	ROC	Alexander Graham; Kyle Chalmers; Zac Incerti; Thomas Neill	Australia	
Swimming	Women's 200m freestyle	Ariarne Titmus	Australia	OR	Siobhan Haughey	Hong Kong	Penny Oleksiak	Canada	
Swimming	Women's 1500m freestyle	Katie Ledecky	United States		Erica Sullivan	United States	Sarah Köhler	Germany	
Swimming	Women's 200m individual medley	Yui Ohashi	Japan		Alex Walsh	United States	Kate Douglass	United States	
Weightlifting	Men's 73kg	Shi Zhiyong	China	WR	Julio Mayora	Venezuela	Rahmat Erwin Abdullah	Indonesia	

=== Day 6: 29 July ===
Sport	Event	Gold medalist(s)			Silver medalist(s)		Bronze medalist(s)		Ref
Sport	Event	Competitor(s)	Team	Rec	Competitor(s)	Team	Competitor(s)	Team	Ref
Canoeing	Women's slalom C-1	Jessica Fox	Australia		Mallory Franklin	Great Britain	Andrea Herzog	Germany	
Fencing	Women's team foil	Inna Deriglazova; Adelina Zagidullina; Larisa Korobeynikova; Marta Martyanova	ROC		Anita Blaze; Astrid Guyart; Pauline Ranvier; Ysaora Thibus	France	Erica Cipressa; Arianna Errigo; Martina Batini; Alice Volpi	Italy	
Gymnastics	Women's artistic individual all-around	Sunisa Lee	United States		Rebeca Andrade	Brazil	Angelina Melnikova	ROC	
Judo	Men's 100kg	Aaron Wolf	Japan		Cho Gu-ham	South Korea	Jorge Fonseca	Portugal	
Judo	Men's 100kg	Aaron Wolf	Japan		Cho Gu-ham	South Korea	Niyaz Ilyasov	ROC	
Judo	Women's 78kg	Shori Hamada	Japan		Madeleine Malonga	France	Anna-Maria Wagner	Germany	
Judo	Women's 78kg	Shori Hamada	Japan		Madeleine Malonga	France	Mayra Aguiar	Brazil	
Rowing	Men's coxless pair	Martin Sinković; Valent Sinković	Croatia		Marius Cozmiuc; Ciprian Tudosă	Romania	Frederic Vystavel; Joachim Sutton	Denmark	
Rowing	Men's lightweight double sculls	Fintan McCarthy; Paul O'Donovan	Ireland		Jonathan Rommelmann; Jason Osborne	Germany	Stefano Oppo; Pietro Ruta	Italy	
Rowing	Women's coxless pair	Grace Prendergast; Kerri Gowler	New Zealand		Vasilisa Stepanova; Elena Oriabinskaia	ROC	Caileigh Filmer; Hillary Janssens	Canada	
Rowing	Women's lightweight double sculls	Valentina Rodini; Federica Cesarini	Italy		Laura Tarantola; Claire Bové	France	Marieke Keijser; Ilse Paulis	Netherlands	
Shooting	Men's trap	Jiří Lipták	Czech Republic	OR	David Kostelecký	Czech Republic	Matthew Coward-Holley	Great Britain	
Shooting	Women's trap	Zuzana Rehák-Štefečeková	Slovakia	OR	Kayle Browning	United States	Alessandra Perilli	San Marino	
Swimming	Men's 100m freestyle	Caeleb Dressel	United States	OR	Kyle Chalmers	Australia	Kliment Kolesnikov	ROC	
Swimming	Men's 800m freestyle	Bobby Finke	United States		Gregorio Paltrinieri	Italy	Mykhailo Romanchuk	Ukraine	
Swimming	Men's 200m breaststroke	Zac Stubblety-Cook	Australia	OR	Arno Kamminga	Netherlands	Matti Mattsson	Finland	
Swimming	Women's 200m butterfly	Zhang Yufei	China	OR	Regan Smith	United States	Hali Flickinger	United States	
Swimming	Women's 4×200m freestyle relay	Yang Junxuan; Tang Muhan; Zhang Yufei; Li Bingjie	China	WR	Allison Schmitt; Paige Madden; Katie McLaughlin; Katie Ledecky	United States	Ariarne Titmus; Emma McKeon; Madison Wilson; Leah Neale	Australia	
Table tennis	Women's singles	Chen Meng	China		Sun Yingsha	China	Mima Ito	Japan	

=== Day 7: 30 July ===
Sport	Event	Gold medalist(s)			Silver medalist(s)		Bronze medalist(s)		Ref
Sport	Event	Competitor(s)	Team	Rec	Competitor(s)	Team	Competitor(s)	Team	Ref
Archery	Women's individual	An San	South Korea		Elena Osipova	ROC	Lucilla Boari	Italy	
Athletics	Men's 10,000m	Selemon Barega	Ethiopia		Joshua Cheptegei	Uganda	Jacob Kiplimo	Uganda	
Badminton	Mixed doubles	Wang Yilyu; Huang Dongping	China		Zheng Siwei; Huang Yaqiong	China	Yuta Watanabe; Arisa Higashino	Japan	
Canoeing	Men's slalom K-1	Jiří Prskavec	Czech Republic		Jakub Grigar	Slovakia	Hannes Aigner	Germany	
Cycling	Men's BMX racing	Niek Kimmann	Netherlands		Kye Whyte	Great Britain	Carlos Ramírez	Colombia	
Cycling	Women's BMX racing	Beth Shriever	Great Britain		Mariana Pajón	Colombia	Merel Smulders	Netherlands	
Fencing	Men's team épée	Koki Kano; Kazuyasu Minobe; Masaru Yamada; Satoru Uyama	Japan		Sergey Bida; Sergey Khodos; Pavel Sukhov; Nikita Glazkov	ROC	Park Sang-young; Ma Se-geon; Song Jae-ho; Kweon Young-jun	South Korea	
Gymnastics	Women's trampoline	Zhu Xueying	China		Liu Lingling	China	Bryony Page	Great Britain	
Judo	Men's +100kg	Lukáš Krpálek	Czech Republic		Guram Tushishvili	Georgia	Teddy Riner	France	
Judo	Men's +100kg	Lukáš Krpálek	Czech Republic		Guram Tushishvili	Georgia	Tamerlan Bashaev	ROC	
Judo	Women's +78kg	Akira Sone	Japan		Idalys Ortiz	Cuba	Iryna Kindzerska	Azerbaijan	
Judo	Women's +78kg	Akira Sone	Japan		Idalys Ortiz	Cuba	Romane Dicko	France	
Rowing	Men's single sculls	Stefanos Ntouskos	Greece		Kjetil Borch	Norway	Damir Martin	Croatia	
Rowing	Men's eight	Tom Mackintosh; Hamish Bond; Tom Murray; Michael Brake; Dan Williamson; Phillip Wilson; Shaun Kirkham; Matt Macdonald; Sam Bosworth	New Zealand		Johannes Weißenfeld; Laurits Follert; Olaf Roggensack; Torben Johannesen; Jakob Schneider; Malte Jakschik; Richard Schmidt; Hannes Ocik; Martin Sauer	Germany	Josh Bugajski; Jacob Dawson; Thomas George; Moe Sbihi; Charles Elwes; Oliver Wynne-Griffith; James Rudkin; Thomas Ford; Henry Fieldman	Great Britain	
Rowing	Women's single sculls	Emma Twigg	New Zealand		Hanna Prakatsen	ROC	Magdalena Lobnig	Austria	
Rowing	Women's eight	Lisa Roman; Kasia Gruchalla-Wesierski; Christine Roper; Andrea Proske; Susanne Grainger; Madison Mailey; Sydney Payne; Avalon Wasteneys; Kristen Kit	Canada		Ella Greenslade; Emma Dyke; Lucy Spoors; Kelsey Bevan; Grace Prendergast; Kerri Gowler; Beth Ross; Jackie Gowler; Caleb Shepherd	New Zealand	Wang Zifeng; Wang Yuwei; Xu Fei; Miao Tian; Zhang Min; Ju Rui; Li Jingjing; Guo Linlin; Zhang Dechang	China	
Shooting	Women's 25m pistol	Vitalina Batsarashkina	ROC	OR	Kim Min-jung	South Korea	Xiao Jiaruixuan	China	
Swimming	Men's 200m backstroke	Evgeny Rylov	ROC	OR	Ryan Murphy	United States	Luke Greenbank	Great Britain	
Swimming	Men's 200m individual medley	Wang Shun	China	AS	Duncan Scott	Great Britain	Jérémy Desplanches	Switzerland	
Swimming	Women's 100m freestyle	Emma McKeon	Australia	OR	Siobhan Haughey	Hong Kong	Cate Campbell	Australia	
Swimming	Women's 200m breaststroke	Tatjana Schoenmaker	South Africa	WR	Lilly King	United States	Annie Lazor	United States	
Table tennis	Men's singles	Ma Long	China		Fan Zhendong	China	Dimitrij Ovtcharov	Germany	
Tennis	Men's doubles	Nikola Mektić; Mate Pavić	Croatia		Marin Čilić; Ivan Dodig	Croatia	Marcus Daniell; Michael Venus	New Zealand	

=== Day 8: 31 July ===
Sport	Event	Gold medalist(s)			Silver medalist(s)		Bronze medalist(s)		Ref
Sport	Event	Competitor(s)	Team	Rec	Competitor(s)	Team	Competitor(s)	Team	Ref
Archery	Men's individual	Mete Gazoz	Turkey		Mauro Nespoli	Italy	Takaharu Furukawa	Japan	
Athletics	Men's discus throw	Daniel Ståhl	Sweden		Simon Pettersson	Sweden	Lukas Weißhaidinger	Austria	
Athletics	Women's 100m	Elaine Thompson-Herah	Jamaica	OR	Shelly-Ann Fraser-Pryce	Jamaica	Shericka Jackson	Jamaica	
Athletics	Mixed 4×400m relay	Karol Zalewski; Natalia Kaczmarek; Justyna Święty-Ersetic; Kajetan Duszyński; Dariusz Kowaluk*; Iga Baumgart*; Małgorzata Hołub-Kowalik*	Poland	OR	Lidio Andrés Feliz; Marileidy Paulino; Anabel Medina; Alexander Ogando; Luguelín Santos*	Dominican Republic	Kendall Ellis; Vernon Norwood; Trevor Stewart; Kaylin Whitney; Elija Godwin*; Lynna Irby*; Taylor Manson*; Bryce Deadmon*	United States	
Badminton	Men's doubles	Lee Yang; Wang Chi-lin	Chinese Taipei		Li Junhui; Liu Yuchen	China	Aaron Chia; Soh Wooi Yik	Malaysia	
Fencing	Women's team sabre	Olga Nikitina; Sofia Pozdniakova; Sofya Velikaya	ROC		Sara Balzer; Cécilia Berder; Manon Brunet; Charlotte Lembach	France	Choi Soo-yeon; Kim Ji-yeon; Seo Ji-yeon; Yoon Ji-su	South Korea	
Gymnastics	Men's trampoline	Ivan Litvinovich	Belarus		Dong Dong	China	Dylan Schmidt	New Zealand	
Judo	Mixed team	Clarisse Agbegnenou; Amandine Buchard; Guillaume Chaine; Axel Clerget; Sarah-Léonie Cysique; Romane Dicko; Alexandre Iddir; Kilian Le Blouch; Madeleine Malonga; Margaux Pinot; Teddy Riner	France		Hifumi Abe; Uta Abe; Chizuru Arai; Shori Hamada; Hisayoshi Harasawa; Shoichiro Mukai; Takanori Nagase; Shohei Ono; Akira Sone; Miku Tashiro; Aaron Wolf; Tsukasa Yoshida	Japan	Johannes Frey; Karl-Richard Frey; Jasmin Grabowski; Dominic Ressel; Giovanna Scoccimarro; Sebastian Seidl; Theresa Stoll; Martyna Trajdos; Eduard Trippel; Anna-Maria Wagner; Igor Wandtke	Germany	
Judo	Mixed team	Clarisse Agbegnenou; Amandine Buchard; Guillaume Chaine; Axel Clerget; Sarah-Léonie Cysique; Romane Dicko; Alexandre Iddir; Kilian Le Blouch; Madeleine Malonga; Margaux Pinot; Teddy Riner	France		Hifumi Abe; Uta Abe; Chizuru Arai; Shori Hamada; Hisayoshi Harasawa; Shoichiro Mukai; Takanori Nagase; Shohei Ono; Akira Sone; Miku Tashiro; Aaron Wolf; Tsukasa Yoshida	Japan	Tohar Butbul; Raz Hershko; Li Kochman; Inbar Lanir; Sagi Muki; Timna Nelson-Levy; Peter Paltchik; Shira Rishony; Or Sasson; Gili Sharir; Baruch Shmailov	Israel	
Rugby sevens	Women's	Michaela Blyde; Kelly Brazier; Gayle Broughton; Theresa Fitzpatrick; Stacey Fluhler; Sarah Hirini; Shiray Kaka; Tyla Nathan-Wong; Risealeaana Pouri-Lane; Alena Saili; Ruby Tui; Portia Woodman	New Zealand		Coralie Bertrand; Anne-Cécile Ciofani; Caroline Drouin; Camille Grassineau; Lina Guérin; Fanny Horta; Shannon Izar; Chloé Jacquet; Carla Neisen; Séraphine Okemba; Chloé Pelle; Jade Ulutule	France	Lavena Cavuru; Raijieli Daveua; Sesenieli Donu; Laisana Likuceva; Rusila Nagasau; Ana Naimasi; Alowesi Nakoci; Roela Radiniyavuni; Viniana Riwai; Tokasa Seniyasi; Vasiti Solikoviti; Reapi Ulunisau	Fiji	
Sailing	Men's RS:X	Kiran Badloe	Netherlands		Thomas Goyard	France	Bi Kun	China	
Sailing	Women's RS:X	Lu Yunxiu	China		Charline Picon	France	Emma Wilson	Great Britain	
Shooting	Women's 50m rifle three positions	Nina Christen	Switzerland	OR	Yulia Zykova	ROC	Yulia Karimova	ROC	
Shooting	Mixed trap team	Fátima Gálvez; Alberto Fernández	Spain		Alessandra Perilli; Gian Marco Berti	San Marino	Madelynn Bernau; Brian Burrows	United States	
Swimming	Men's 100m butterfly	Caeleb Dressel	United States	WR	Kristóf Milák	Hungary	Noè Ponti	Switzerland	
Swimming	Women's 800m freestyle	Katie Ledecky	United States		Ariarne Titmus	Australia	Simona Quadarella	Italy	
Swimming	Women's 200m backstroke	Kaylee McKeown	Australia		Kylie Masse	Canada	Emily Seebohm	Australia	
Swimming	Mixed 4×100m medley relay	Kathleen Dawson; Adam Peaty; James Guy; Anna Hopkin	Great Britain		Xu Jiayu; Yan Zibei; Zhang Yufei; Yang Junxuan	China	Kaylee McKeown; Zac Stubblety-Cook; Matthew Temple; Emma McKeon	Australia	
Tennis	Women's singles	Belinda Bencic	Switzerland		Markéta Vondroušová	Czech Republic	Elina Svitolina	Ukraine	
Triathlon	Mixed relay	Jessica Learmonth; Jonathan Brownlee; Georgia Taylor-Brown; Alex Yee	Great Britain		Katie Zaferes; Kevin McDowell; Taylor Knibb; Morgan Pearson	United States	Léonie Périault; Dorian Coninx; Cassandre Beaugrand; Vincent Luis	France	
Weightlifting	Men's 81kg	Lü Xiaojun	China	OR	Zacarías Bonnat	Dominican Republic	Antonino Pizzolato	Italy	
Weightlifting	Men's 96kg	Fares Ibrahim	Qatar	OR	Keydomar Vallenilla	Venezuela	Anton Pliesnoi	Georgia	

=== Day 9: 1 August ===
Sport	Event	Gold medalist(s)			Silver medalist(s)		Bronze medalist(s)		Ref
Sport	Event	Competitor(s)	Team	Rec	Competitor(s)	Team	Competitor(s)	Team	Ref
Athletics	Men's 100m	Marcell Jacobs	Italy		Fred Kerley	United States	Andre De Grasse	Canada	
Athletics	Men's high jump	Mutaz Essa Barshim	Qatar		Not awarded due to a tie for gold		Maksim Nedasekau	Belarus	
Athletics	Men's high jump	Gianmarco Tamberi	Italy		Not awarded due to a tie for gold		Maksim Nedasekau	Belarus	
Athletics	Women's triple jump	Yulimar Rojas	Venezuela	WR	Patrícia Mamona	Portugal	Ana Peleteiro	Spain	
Athletics	Women's shot put	Gong Lijiao	China		Raven Saunders	United States	Valerie Adams	New Zealand	
Badminton	Women's singles	Chen Yufei	China		Tai Tzu-ying	Chinese Taipei	P. V. Sindhu	India	
Cycling	Men's BMX freestyle	Logan Martin	Australia		Daniel Dhers	Venezuela	Declan Brooks	Great Britain	
Cycling	Women's BMX freestyle	Charlotte Worthington	Great Britain		Hannah Roberts	United States	Nikita Ducarroz	Switzerland	
Diving	Women's 3m springboard	Shi Tingmao	China		Wang Han	China	Krysta Palmer	United States	
Fencing	Men's team foil	Erwann Le Péchoux; Enzo Lefort; Julien Mertine; Maxime Pauty	France		Anton Borodachev; Kirill Borodachev; Vladislav Mylnikov; Timur Safin	ROC	Race Imboden; Nick Itkin; Alexander Massialas; Gerek Meinhardt	United States	
Golf	Men's	Xander Schauffele	United States		Rory Sabbatini	Slovakia	Pan Cheng-tsung	Chinese Taipei	
Gymnastics	Men's floor	Artem Dolgopyat	Israel		Rayderley Zapata	Spain	Xiao Ruoteng	China	
Gymnastics	Men's pommel horse	Max Whitlock	Great Britain		Lee Chih-kai	Chinese Taipei	Kazuma Kaya	Japan	
Gymnastics	Women's uneven bars	Nina Derwael	Belgium		Anastasia Ilyankova	ROC	Sunisa Lee	United States	
Gymnastics	Women's vault	Rebeca Andrade	Brazil		MyKayla Skinner	United States	Yeo Seo-jeong	South Korea	
Sailing	Men's Laser	Matthew Wearn	Australia		Tonči Stipanović	Croatia	Hermann Tomasgaard	Norway	
Sailing	Women's Laser Radial	Anne-Marie Rindom	Denmark		Josefin Olsson	Sweden	Marit Bouwmeester	Netherlands	
Swimming	Men's 50m freestyle	Caeleb Dressel	United States	OR	Florent Manaudou	France	Bruno Fratus	Brazil	
Swimming	Men's 1500m freestyle	Bobby Finke	United States		Mykhailo Romanchuk	Ukraine	Florian Wellbrock	Germany	
Swimming	Men's 4×100m medley relay	Ryan Murphy; Michael Andrew; Caeleb Dressel; Zach Apple	United States	WR	Luke Greenbank; James Guy; Adam Peaty; Duncan Scott	Great Britain	Thomas Ceccon; Nicolò Martinenghi; Federico Burdisso; Alessandro Miressi	Italy	
Swimming	Women's 50m freestyle	Emma McKeon	Australia	OR	Sarah Sjöström	Sweden	Pernille Blume	Denmark	
Swimming	Women's 4×100m medley relay	Kaylee McKeown; Chelsea Hodges; Emma McKeon; Cate Campbell	Australia	OR	Regan Smith; Lydia Jacoby; Torri Huske; Abbey Weitzeil	United States	Kylie Masse; Sydney Pickrem; Maggie Mac Neil; Penny Oleksiak	Canada	
Tennis	Men's singles (Note: Bronze medalist(s) determined on the previous day.)	Alexander Zverev	Germany		Karen Khachanov	ROC	Pablo Carreño Busta	Spain	
Tennis	Women's doubles	Barbora Krejčíková; Kateřina Siniaková	Czech Republic		Belinda Bencic; Viktorija Golubic	Switzerland	Laura Pigossi; Luisa Stefani	Brazil	
Tennis	Mixed doubles	Anastasia Pavlyuchenkova; Andrey Rublev	ROC		Elena Vesnina; Aslan Karatsev	ROC	Ashleigh Barty; John Peers	Australia	
Weightlifting	Women's 76kg	Neisi Dájomes	Ecuador		Katherine Nye	United States	Aremi Fuentes	Mexico	

=== Day 10: 2 August ===
Sport	Event	Gold medalist(s)			Silver medalist(s)		Bronze medalist(s)		Ref
Sport	Event	Competitor(s)	Teambsh	Rec	Competitor(s)	Team	Competitor(s)	Team	Ref
Athletics	Men's 3000m steeplechase	Soufiane El Bakkali	Morocco		Lamecha Girma	Ethiopia	Benjamin Kigen	Kenya	
Athletics	Men's long jump	Miltiadis Tentoglou	Greece		Juan Miguel Echevarría	Cuba	Maykel Massó	Cuba	
Athletics	Women's 5000m	Sifan Hassan	Netherlands		Hellen Obiri	Kenya	Gudaf Tsegay	Ethiopia	
Athletics	Women's 100m hurdles	Jasmine Camacho-Quinn	Puerto Rico		Kendra Harrison	United States	Megan Tapper	Jamaica	
Athletics	Women's discus throw	Valarie Allman	United States		Kristin Pudenz	Germany	Yaime Pérez	Cuba	
Badminton	Men's singles	Viktor Axelsen	Denmark		Chen Long	China	Anthony Sinisuka Ginting	Indonesia	
Badminton	Women's doubles	Greysia Polii; Apriyani Rahayu	Indonesia		Chen Qingchen; Jia Yifan	China	Kim So-yeong; Kong Hee-yong	South Korea	
Cycling	Women's team sprint	Bao Shanju; Zhong Tianshi	China	WR	Lea Friedrich; Emma Hinze	Germany	Daria Shmeleva; Anastasia Voynova	ROC	
Equestrian	Individual eventing	Julia Krajewski	Germany		Tom McEwen	Great Britain	Andrew Hoy	Australia	
Equestrian	Team eventing	Laura Collett; Tom McEwen; Oliver Townend	Great Britain		Kevin McNab; Andrew Hoy; Shane Rose	Australia	Nicolas Touzaint; Karim Laghouag; Christopher Six	France	
Gymnastics	Men's rings	Liu Yang	China		You Hao	China	Eleftherios Petrounias	Greece	
Gymnastics	Men's vault	Shin Jea-hwan	South Korea		Denis Ablyazin	ROC	Artur Davtyan	Armenia	
Gymnastics	Women's floor	Jade Carey	United States		Vanessa Ferrari	Italy	Mai Murakami	Japan	
Gymnastics	Women's floor	Jade Carey	United States		Vanessa Ferrari	Italy	Angelina Melnikova	ROC	
Shooting	Men's 50m rifle three positions	Zhang Changhong	China	WR	Sergey Kamenskiy	ROC	Milenko Sebić	Serbia	
Shooting	Men's 25m rapid fire pistol	Jean Quiquampoix	France		Leuris Pupo	Cuba	Li Yuehong	China	
Weightlifting	Women's 87kg	Wang Zhouyu	China		Tamara Salazar	Ecuador	Crismery Santana	Dominican Republic	
Weightlifting	Women's +87kg	Li Wenwen	China	OR	Emily Campbell	Great Britain	Sarah Robles	United States	
Wrestling	Men's Greco-Roman 60kg	Luis Orta	Cuba		Kenichiro Fumita	Japan	Walihan Sailike	China	
Wrestling	Men's Greco-Roman 60kg	Luis Orta	Cuba		Kenichiro Fumita	Japan	Sergey Emelin	ROC	
Wrestling	Men's Greco-Roman 130kg	Mijaín López	Cuba		Iakob Kajaia	Georgia	Rıza Kayaalp	Turkey	
Wrestling	Men's Greco-Roman 130kg	Mijaín López	Cuba		Iakob Kajaia	Georgia	Sergey Semenov	ROC	
Wrestling	Women's freestyle 76kg	Aline Rotter-Focken	Germany		Adeline Gray	United States	Yasemin Adar	Turkey	
Wrestling	Women's freestyle 76kg	Aline Rotter-Focken	Germany		Adeline Gray	United States	Zhou Qian	China	

=== Day 11: 3 August ===
Sport	Event	Gold medalist(s)			Silver medalist(s)		Bronze medalist(s)		Ref
Sport	Event	Competitor(s)	Team	Rec	Competitor(s)	Team	Competitor(s)	Team	Ref
Athletics	Men's 400m hurdles	Karsten Warholm	Norway	WR	Rai Benjamin	United States	Alison dos Santos	Brazil	
Athletics	Men's pole vault	Armand Duplantis	Sweden		Christopher Nilsen	United States	Thiago Braz	Brazil	
Athletics	Women's 200m	Elaine Thompson-Herah	Jamaica		Christine Mboma	Namibia	Gabrielle Thomas	United States	
Athletics	Women's 800m	Athing Mu	United States		Keely Hodgkinson	Great Britain	Raevyn Rogers	United States	
Athletics	Women's long jump	Malaika Mihambo	Germany		Brittney Reese	United States	Ese Brume	Nigeria	
Athletics	Women's hammer throw	Anita Włodarczyk	Poland		Wang Zheng	China	Malwina Kopron	Poland	
Boxing	Men's welterweight (Note: Bronze medalist(s) determined a few days earlier.)	Roniel Iglesias	Cuba		Pat McCormack	Great Britain	Aidan Walsh	Ireland	
Boxing	Men's welterweight	Roniel Iglesias	Cuba		Pat McCormack	Great Britain	Andrey Zamkovoy	ROC	
Boxing	Women's featherweight	Sena Irie	Japan		Nesthy Petecio	Philippines	Irma Testa	Italy	
Boxing	Women's featherweight	Sena Irie	Japan		Nesthy Petecio	Philippines	Karriss Artingstall	Great Britain	
Canoeing	Men's C-2 1000m	Serguey Torres; Fernando Jorge	Cuba		Liu Hao; Zheng Pengfei	China	Sebastian Brendel; Tim Hecker	Germany	
Canoeing	Men's K-1 1000m	Bálint Kopasz	Hungary		Ádám Varga	Hungary	Fernando Pimenta	Portugal	
Canoeing	Women's K-1 200m	Lisa Carrington	New Zealand		Teresa Portela	Spain	Emma Jørgensen	Denmark	
Canoeing	Women's K-2 500m	Lisa Carrington; Caitlin Regal	New Zealand		Karolina Naja; Anna Puławska	Poland	Danuta Kozák; Dóra Bodonyi	Hungary	
Cycling	Men's team sprint	Jeffrey Hoogland; Harrie Lavreysen; Roy van den Berg	Netherlands	OR	Jack Carlin; Jason Kenny; Ryan Owens	Great Britain	Florian Grengbo; Rayan Helal; Sébastien Vigier	France	
Cycling	Women's team pursuit	Franziska Brauße; Lisa Brennauer; Lisa Klein; Mieke Kröger	Germany	WR	Katie Archibald; Laura Kenny; Neah Evans; Josie Knight	Great Britain	Megan Jastrab; Jennifer Valente; Chloé Dygert; Emma White	United States	
Diving	Men's 3m springboard	Xie Siyi	China		Wang Zongyuan	China	Jack Laugher	Great Britain	
Gymnastics	Men's horizontal bar	Daiki Hashimoto	Japan		Tin Srbić	Croatia	Nikita Nagornyy	ROC	
Gymnastics	Men's parallel bars	Zou Jingyuan	China		Lukas Dauser	Germany	Ferhat Arıcan	Turkey	
Gymnastics	Women's balance beam	Guan Chenchen	China		Tang Xijing	China	Simone Biles	United States	
Sailing	Men's 49er	Dylan Fletcher; Stuart Bithell	Great Britain		Peter Burling; Blair Tuke	New Zealand	Erik Heil; Thomas Plößel	Germany	
Sailing	Women's 49er FX	Martine Grael; Kahena Kunze	Brazil		Tina Lutz; Susann Beucke	Germany	Annemiek Bekkering; Annette Duetz	Netherlands	
Sailing	Men's Finn	Giles Scott	Great Britain		Zsombor Berecz	Hungary	Joan Cardona Méndez	Spain	
Sailing	Nacra 17	Ruggero Tita; Caterina Banti	Italy		John Gimson; Anna Burnet	Great Britain	Paul Kohlhoff; Alica Stuhlemmer	Germany	
Weightlifting	Men's 109kg	Akbar Djuraev	Uzbekistan	OR	Simon Martirosyan	Armenia	Artūrs Plēsnieks	Latvia	
Wrestling	Men's Greco-Roman 77kg	Tamás Lőrincz	Hungary		Akzhol Makhmudov	Kyrgyzstan	Shohei Yabiku	Japan	
Wrestling	Men's Greco-Roman 77kg	Tamás Lőrincz	Hungary		Akzhol Makhmudov	Kyrgyzstan	Rafig Huseynov	Azerbaijan	
Wrestling	Men's Greco-Roman 97 kg	Musa Evloev	ROC		Artur Aleksanyan	Armenia	Tadeusz Michalik	Poland	
Wrestling	Men's Greco-Roman 97 kg	Musa Evloev	ROC		Artur Aleksanyan	Armenia	Mohammad Hadi Saravi	Iran	
Wrestling	Women's freestyle 68kg	Tamyra Mensah	United States		Blessing Oborududu	Nigeria	Alla Cherkasova	Ukraine	
Wrestling	Women's freestyle 68kg	Tamyra Mensah	United States		Blessing Oborududu	Nigeria	Meerim Zhumanazarova	Kyrgyzstan	

=== Day 12: 4 August ===
Sport	Event	Gold medalist(s)			Silver medalist(s)		Bronze medalist(s)		Ref
Sport	Event	Competitor(s)	Team	Rec	Competitor(s)	Team	Competitor(s)	Team	Ref
Artistic swimming	Duet	Svetlana Kolesnichenko; Svetlana Romashina	ROC		Huang Xuechen; Sun Wenyan	China	Marta Fiedina; Anastasiya Savchuk	Ukraine	
Athletics	Men's 200m	Andre De Grasse	Canada		Kenneth Bednarek	United States	Noah Lyles	United States	
Athletics	Men's 800m	Emmanuel Korir	Kenya		Ferguson Rotich	Kenya	Patryk Dobek	Poland	
Athletics	Men's hammer throw	Wojciech Nowicki	Poland		Eivind Henriksen	Norway	Paweł Fajdek	Poland	
Athletics	Women's 400m hurdles	Sydney McLaughlin	United States	WR	Dalilah Muhammad	United States	Femke Bol	Netherlands	
Athletics	Women's 3000m steeplechase	Peruth Chemutai	Uganda		Courtney Frerichs	United States	Hyvin Kiyeng	Kenya	
Boxing	Men's light heavyweight	Arlen López	Cuba		Benjamin Whittaker	Great Britain	Imam Khataev	ROC	
Boxing	Men's light heavyweight	Arlen López	Cuba		Benjamin Whittaker	Great Britain	Loren Alfonso	Azerbaijan	
Cycling	Men's team pursuit	Simone Consonni; Filippo Ganna; Francesco Lamon; Jonathan Milan	Italy		Lasse Norman Hansen; Niklas Larsen; Frederik Rodenberg; Rasmus Pedersen	Denmark	Kelland O'Brien; Sam Welsford; Leigh Howard; Luke Plapp	Australia	
Equestrian	Individual jumping	Ben Maher	Great Britain		Peder Fredricson	Sweden	Maikel van der Vleuten	Netherlands	
Sailing	Men's 470	Mathew Belcher; William Ryan	Australia		Anton Dahlberg; Fredrik Bergström	Sweden	Jordi Xammar; Nicolás Rodríguez	Spain	
Sailing	Women's 470	Hannah Mills; Eilidh McIntyre	Great Britain		Agnieszka Skrzypulec; Jolanta Ogar	Poland	Camille Lecointre; Aloïse Retornaz	France	
Skateboarding	Women's park	Sakura Yosozumi	Japan		Kokona Hiraki	Japan	Sky Brown	Great Britain	
Swimming	Women's marathon 10km	Ana Marcela Cunha	Brazil		Sharon van Rouwendaal	Netherlands	Kareena Lee	Australia	
Weightlifting	Men's +109kg	Lasha Talakhadze	Georgia	WR	Ali Davoudi	Iran	Man Asaad	Syria	
Wrestling	Men's Greco-Roman 67kg	Mohammad Reza Geraei	Iran		Parviz Nasibov	Ukraine	Frank Stäbler	Germany	
Wrestling	Men's Greco-Roman 67kg	Mohammad Reza Geraei	Iran		Parviz Nasibov	Ukraine	Mohamed Ibrahim El-Sayed	Egypt	
Wrestling	Men's Greco-Roman 87kg	Zhan Beleniuk	Ukraine		Viktor Lőrincz	Hungary	Denis Kudla	Germany	
Wrestling	Men's Greco-Roman 87kg	Zhan Beleniuk	Ukraine		Viktor Lőrincz	Hungary	Zurabi Datunashvili	Serbia	
Wrestling	Women's freestyle 62kg	Yukako Kawai	Japan		Aisuluu Tynybekova	Kyrgyzstan	Iryna Koliadenko	Ukraine	
Wrestling	Women's freestyle 62kg	Yukako Kawai	Japan		Aisuluu Tynybekova	Kyrgyzstan	Taybe Yusein	Bulgaria	

=== Day 13: 5 August ===
Sport	Event	Gold medalist(s)			Silver medalist(s)		Bronze medalist(s)		Ref
Sport	Event	Competitor(s)	Team	Rec	Competitor(s)	Team	Competitor(s)	Team	Ref
Athletics	Men's 400m	Steven Gardiner	Bahamas		Anthony Zambrano	Colombia	Kirani James	Grenada	
Athletics	Men's 110m hurdles	Hansle Parchment	Jamaica		Grant Holloway	United States	Ronald Levy	Jamaica	
Athletics	Men's 20km walk	Massimo Stano	Italy		Koki Ikeda	Japan	Toshikazu Yamanishi	Japan	
Athletics	Men's triple jump	Pedro Pichardo	Portugal		Zhu Yaming	China	Hugues Fabrice Zango	Burkina Faso	
Athletics	Men's shot put	Ryan Crouser	United States	OR	Joe Kovacs	United States	Tom Walsh	New Zealand	
Athletics	Men's decathlon	Damian Warner	Canada	OR	Kevin Mayer	France	Ashley Moloney	Australia	
Athletics	Women's pole vault	Katie Nageotte	United States		Anzhelika Sidorova	ROC	Holly Bradshaw	Great Britain	
Athletics	Women's heptathlon	Nafissatou Thiam	Belgium		Anouk Vetter	Netherlands	Emma Oosterwegel	Netherlands	
Boxing	Men's featherweight	Albert Batyrgaziev	ROC		Duke Ragan	United States	Samuel Takyi	Ghana	
Boxing	Men's featherweight	Albert Batyrgaziev	ROC		Duke Ragan	United States	Lázaro Álvarez	Cuba	
Canoeing	Men's K-1 200m	Sándor Tótka	Hungary		Manfredi Rizza	Italy	Liam Heath	Great Britain	
Canoeing	Men's K-2 1000m	Jean van der Westhuyzen; Thomas Green	Australia		Max Hoff; Jacob Schopf	Germany	Josef Dostál; Radek Šlouf	Czech Republic	
Canoeing	Women's C-1 200m	Nevin Harrison	United States		Laurence Vincent-Lapointe	Canada	Liudmyla Luzan	Ukraine	
Canoeing	Women's K-1 500m	Lisa Carrington	New Zealand		Tamara Csipes	Hungary	Emma Jørgensen	Denmark	
Cycling	Men's omnium	Matthew Walls	Great Britain		Campbell Stewart	New Zealand	Elia Viviani	Italy	
Cycling	Women's keirin	Shanne Braspennincx	Netherlands		Ellesse Andrews	New Zealand	Lauriane Genest	Canada	
Diving	Women's 10m platform	Quan Hongchan	China		Chen Yuxi	China	Melissa Wu	Australia	
Field hockey	Men's	Arthur Van Doren; John-John Dohmen; Florent Van Aubel; Sébastien Dockier; Cédric Charlier; Gauthier Boccard; Nicolas De Kerpel; Augustin Meurmans; Alexander Hendrickx; Thomas Briels; Félix Denayer; Vincent Vanasch; Simon Gougnard; Arthur De Sloover; Antoine Kina; Loïck Luypaert; Victor Wegnez; Tom Boon	Belgium		Lachlan Sharp; Tom Craig; Tom Wickham; Matt Dawson; Joshua Beltz; Eddie Ockenden; Jacob Whetton; Blake Govers; Dylan Martin; Joshua Simmonds; Tim Howard; Aran Zalewski; Flynn Ogilvie; Daniel Beale; Trent Mitton; Tim Brand; Andrew Charter; Jeremy Hayward	Australia	Surender Kumar; Varun Kumar; Birendra Lakra; Rupinder Pal Singh; Vivek Prasad; Amit Rohidas; Nilakanta Sharma; Dilpreet Singh; Gurjant Singh; Hardik Singh; Harmanpreet Singh; Mandeep Singh; Manpreet Singh; Shamsher Singh; Simranjeet Singh; P. R. Sreejesh; Sumit; Lalit Upadhyay	India	
Karate	Men's 67kg	Steven Da Costa	France		Eray Şamdan	Turkey	Darkhan Assadilov	Kazakhstan	
Karate	Men's 67kg	Steven Da Costa	France		Eray Şamdan	Turkey	Abdelrahman Al-Masatfa	Jordan	
Karate	Women's 55kg	Ivet Goranova	Bulgaria		Anzhelika Terliuga	Ukraine	Bettina Plank	Austria	
Karate	Women's 55kg	Ivet Goranova	Bulgaria		Anzhelika Terliuga	Ukraine	Wen Tzu-yun	Chinese Taipei	
Karate	Women's kata	Sandra Sánchez	Spain		Kiyou Shimizu	Japan	Viviana Bottaro	Italy	
Karate	Women's kata	Sandra Sánchez	Spain		Kiyou Shimizu	Japan	Grace Lau	Hong Kong	
Skateboarding	Men's park	Keegan Palmer	Australia		Pedro Barros	Brazil	Cory Juneau	United States	
Sport climbing	Men's combined	Alberto Ginés López	Spain		Nathaniel Coleman	United States	Jakob Schubert	Austria	
Swimming	Men's marathon 10km	Florian Wellbrock	Germany		Kristóf Rasovszky	Hungary	Gregorio Paltrinieri	Italy	
Table tennis	Women's team	Chen Meng; Wang Manyu; Sun Yingsha	China		Miu Hirano; Kasumi Ishikawa; Mima Ito	Japan	Doo Hoi Kem; Lee Ho Ching; Minnie Soo Wai Yam	Hong Kong	
Wrestling	Men's freestyle 57kg	Zaur Uguev	ROC		Ravi Kumar Dahiya	India	Nurislam Sanayev	Kazakhstan	
Wrestling	Men's freestyle 57kg	Zaur Uguev	ROC		Ravi Kumar Dahiya	India	Thomas Gilman	United States	
Wrestling	Men's freestyle 86kg	David Taylor	United States		Hassan Yazdani	Iran	Artur Naifonov	ROC	
Wrestling	Men's freestyle 86kg	David Taylor	United States		Hassan Yazdani	Iran	Myles Amine	San Marino	
Wrestling	Women's freestyle 57kg	Risako Kawai	Japan		Iryna Kurachkina	Belarus	Helen Maroulis	United States	
Wrestling	Women's freestyle 57kg	Risako Kawai	Japan		Iryna Kurachkina	Belarus	Evelina Nikolova	Bulgaria	

=== Day 14: 6 August ===
Sport	Event	Gold medalist(s)			Silver medalist(s)		Bronze medalist(s)		Ref
Sport	Event	Competitor(s)	Team	Rec	Competitor(s)	Team	Competitor(s)	Team	Ref
Athletics	Men's 5000m	Joshua Cheptegei	Uganda		Mohammed Ahmed	Canada	Paul Chelimo	United States	
Athletics	Men's 4×100m relay	Lorenzo Patta; Marcell Jacobs; Eseosa Desalu; Filippo Tortu	Italy		Chijindu Ujah; Zharnel Hughes; Richard Kilty; Nethaneel Mitchell-Blake	Great Britain	Aaron Brown; Jerome Blake; Brendon Rodney; Andre De Grasse	Canada	
Athletics	Men's 50km walk	Dawid Tomala	Poland		Jonathan Hilbert	Germany	Evan Dunfee	Canada	
Athletics	Women's 400m	Shaunae Miller-Uibo	Bahamas		Marileidy Paulino	Dominican Republic	Allyson Felix	United States	
Athletics	Women's 1500m	Faith Kipyegon	Kenya	OR	Laura Muir	Great Britain	Sifan Hassan	Netherlands	
Athletics	Women's 4×100m relay	Briana Williams; Elaine Thompson-Herah; Shelly-Ann Fraser-Pryce; Shericka Jackson; Natasha Morrison*; Remona Burchell*	Jamaica		Javianne Oliver; Teahna Daniels; Jenna Prandini; Gabrielle Thomas; English Gardner*; Aleia Hobbs*	United States	Asha Philip; Imani Lansiquot; Dina Asher-Smith; Daryll Neita	Great Britain	
Athletics	Women's 20km walk	Antonella Palmisano	Italy		Sandra Arenas	Colombia	Liu Hong	China	
Athletics	Women's javelin throw	Liu Shiying	China		Maria Andrejczyk	Poland	Kelsey-Lee Barber	Australia	
Boxing	Men's heavyweight	Julio César La Cruz	Cuba		Muslim Gadzhimagomedov	ROC	David Nyika	New Zealand	
Boxing	Men's heavyweight	Julio César La Cruz	Cuba		Muslim Gadzhimagomedov	ROC	Abner Teixeira	Brazil	
Cycling	Men's sprint	Harrie Lavreysen	Netherlands		Jeffrey Hoogland	Netherlands	Jack Carlin	Great Britain	
Cycling	Women's Madison	Katie Archibald; Laura Kenny	Great Britain		Amalie Dideriksen; Julie Leth	Denmark	Gulnaz Khatuntseva; Maria Novolodskaya	ROC	
Field hockey	Women's	Felice Albers; Eva de Goede; Xan de Waard; Marloes Keetels; Josine Koning; Sanne Koolen; Laurien Leurink; Frédérique Matla; Freeke Moes; Laura Nunnink; Malou Pheninckx; Pien Sanders; Lauren Stam; Margot van Geffen; Stella van Gils; Caia van Maasakker; Maria Verschoor; Lidewij Welten	Netherlands		Agustina Albertarrio; Agostina Alonso; Noel Barrionuevo; Valentina Costa Biondi; Agustina Gorzelany; María José Granatto; Victoria Granatto; Julieta Jankunas; Delfina Merino; Valentina Raposo; Micaela Retegui; Rocío Sánchez Moccia; Victoria Sauze; Belén Succi; Sofía Toccalino; Eugenia Trinchinetti	Argentina	Giselle Ansley; Grace Balsdon; Amy Costello; Fiona Crackles; Sarah Evans; Maddie Hinch; Sarah Jones; Hannah Martin; Shona McCallin; Lily Owsley; Hollie Pearne-Webb; Isabelle Petter; Elena Rayer; Sarah Robertson; Anna Toman; Susannah Townsend; Laura Unsworth; Leah Wilkinson	Great Britain	
Football	Women's	Janine Beckie; Kadeisha Buchanan; Gabrielle Carle; Allysha Chapman; Jessie Fleming; Vanessa Gilles; Julia Grosso; Jordyn Huitema; Stephanie Labbé; Ashley Lawrence; Adriana Leon; Erin McLeod; Nichelle Prince; Quinn; Jayde Riviere; Deanne Rose; Sophie Schmidt; Desiree Scott; Kailen Sheridan; Christine Sinclair; Évelyne Viens; Shelina Zadorsky	Canada		Jonna Andersson; Filippa Angeldal; Anna Anvegård; Kosovare Asllani; Hanna Bennison; Nathalie Björn; Stina Blackstenius; Rebecka Blomqvist; Magdalena Eriksson; Jennifer Falk; Hanna Glas; Lina Hurtig; Amanda Ilestedt; Sofia Jakobsson; Madelen Janogy; Emma Kullberg; Hedvig Lindahl; Zećira Mušović; Julia Roddar; Fridolina Rolfö; Olivia Schough; Caroline Seger	Sweden	Jane Campbell; Abby Dahlkemper; Tierna Davidson; Crystal Dunn; Julie Ertz; Adrianna Franch; Tobin Heath; Lindsey Horan; Casey Krueger; Rose Lavelle; Carli Lloyd; Catarina Macario; Kristie Mewis; Sam Mewis; Alex Morgan; Alyssa Naeher; Kelley O'Hara; Christen Press; Megan Rapinoe; Becky Sauerbrunn; Emily Sonnett; Lynn Williams	United States	
Karate	Men's 75kg	Luigi Busà	Italy		Rafael Aghayev	Azerbaijan	Gábor Hárspataki	Hungary	
Karate	Men's 75kg	Luigi Busà	Italy		Rafael Aghayev	Azerbaijan	Stanislav Horuna	Ukraine	
Karate	Men's kata	Ryo Kiyuna	Japan		Damián Quintero	Spain	Ariel Torres	United States	
Karate	Men's kata	Ryo Kiyuna	Japan		Damián Quintero	Spain	Ali Sofuoğlu	Turkey	
Karate	Women's 61kg	Jovana Preković	Serbia		Yin Xiaoyan	China	Giana Farouk	Egypt	
Karate	Women's 61kg	Jovana Preković	Serbia		Yin Xiaoyan	China	Merve Çoban	Turkey	
Modern pentathlon	Women's	Kate French	Great Britain	OR	Laura Asadauskaitė	Lithuania	Sarolta Kovács	Hungary	
Sport climbing	Women's combined	Janja Garnbret	Slovenia		Miho Nonaka	Japan	Akiyo Noguchi	Japan	
Table tennis	Men's team	Fan Zhendong; Ma Long; Xu Xin	China		Dimitrij Ovtcharov; Patrick Franziska; Timo Boll	Germany	Jun Mizutani; Koki Niwa; Tomokazu Harimoto	Japan	
Volleyball	Women's beach	April Ross; Alix Klineman	United States		Taliqua Clancy; Mariafe Artacho del Solar	Australia	Joana Heidrich; Anouk Vergé-Dépré	Switzerland	
Wrestling	Men's freestyle 74kg	Zaurbek Sidakov	ROC		Mahamedkhabib Kadzimahamedau	Belarus	Bekzod Abdurakhmonov	Uzbekistan	
Wrestling	Men's freestyle 74kg	Zaurbek Sidakov	ROC		Mahamedkhabib Kadzimahamedau	Belarus	Kyle Dake	United States	
Wrestling	Men's freestyle 125kg	Gable Steveson	United States		Geno Petriashvili	Georgia	Amir Hossein Zare	Iran	
Wrestling	Men's freestyle 125kg	Gable Steveson	United States		Geno Petriashvili	Georgia	Taha Akgül	Turkey	
Wrestling	Women's freestyle 53kg	Mayu Mukaida	Japan		Pang Qianyu	China	Vanesa Kaladzinskaya	Belarus	
Wrestling	Women's freestyle 53kg	Mayu Mukaida	Japan		Pang Qianyu	China	Bat-Ochiryn Bolortuyaa	Mongolia	

=== Day 15: 7 August ===
Sport	Event	Gold medalist(s)			Silver medalist(s)		Bronze medalist(s)		Ref
Sport	Event	Competitor(s)	Team	Rec	Competitor(s)	Team	Competitor(s)	Team	Ref
Artistic swimming	Team	Vlada Chigireva; Marina Goliadkina; Svetlana Kolesnichenko; Polina Komar; Alexandra Patskevich; Svetlana Romashina; Alla Shishkina; Maria Shurochkina	ROC		Feng Yu; Guo Li; Huang Xuechen; Liang Xinping; Sun Wenyan; Wang Qianyi; Xiao Yanning; Yin Chengxin	China	Maryna Aleksiiva; Vladyslava Aleksiiva; Marta Fiedina; Kateryna Reznik; Anastasiya Savchuk; Alina Shynkarenko; Kseniya Sydorenko; Yelyzaveta Yakhno	Ukraine	
Athletics	Men's 1500m	Jakob Ingebrigtsen	Norway	OR	Timothy Cheruiyot	Kenya	Josh Kerr	Great Britain	
Athletics	Men's 4×400m relay	Michael Cherry; Michael Norman; Bryce Deadmon; Rai Benjamin; Trevor Stewart*; Randolph Ross*; Vernon Norwood*	United States		Liemarvin Bonevacia; Terrence Agard; Tony van Diepen; Ramsey Angela; Jochem Dobber*	Netherlands	Isaac Makwala; Baboloki Thebe; Zibane Ngozi; Bayapo Ndori	Botswana	
Athletics	Men's javelin throw	Neeraj Chopra	India		Jakub Vadlejch	Czech Republic	Vítězslav Veselý	Czech Republic	
Athletics	Women's 10,000m	Sifan Hassan	Netherlands		Kalkidan Gezahegne	Bahrain	Letesenbet Gidey	Ethiopia	
Athletics	Women's 4×400m relay	Sydney McLaughlin; Allyson Felix; Dalilah Muhammad; Athing Mu; Kaylin Whitney*; Wadeline Jonathas*; Kendall Ellis*; Lynna Irby*	United States		Natalia Kaczmarek; Iga Baumgart-Witan; Małgorzata Hołub-Kowalik; Justyna Święty-Ersetic; Anna Kiełbasińska*	Poland	Roneisha McGregor; Janieve Russell; Shericka Jackson; Candice McLeod; Junelle Bromfield*; Stacey-Ann Williams*	Jamaica	
Athletics	Women's marathon	Peres Jepchirchir	Kenya		Brigid Kosgei	Kenya	Molly Seidel	United States	
Athletics	Women's high jump	Mariya Lasitskene	ROC		Nicola McDermott	Australia	Yaroslava Mahuchikh	Ukraine	
Baseball		Kōyō Aoyagi; Hideto Asamura; Sōsuke Genda; Hiromi Itoh; Suguru Iwazaki; Takuya Kai; Ryosuke Kikuchi; Kensuke Kondo; Ryoji Kuribayashi; Ryoya Kurihara; Masato Morishita; Munetaka Murakami; Yūdai Ōno; Hayato Sakamoto; Kodai Senga; Seiya Suzuki; Kaima Taira; Masahiro Tanaka; Ryutaro Umeno; Tetsuto Yamada; Yoshinobu Yamamoto; Yasuaki Yamasaki; Yuki Yanagita; Masataka Yoshida	Japan		Nick Allen; Eddy Alvarez; Tyler Austin; Shane Baz; Anthony Carter; Triston Casas; Brandon Dickson; Tim Federowicz; Eric Filia; Todd Frazier; Anthony Gose; Edwin Jackson; Scott Kazmir; Patrick Kivlehan; Mark Kolozsvary; Jack López; Nick Martinez; Scott McGough; David Robertson; Joe Ryan; Ryder Ryan; Bubba Starling; Jamie Westbrook; Simeon Woods Richardson	United States	Darío Álvarez; Gabriel Arias; Jairo Asencio; Roldani Baldwin; José Bautista; Emilio Bonifácio; Melky Cabrera; Luis Felipe Castillo; Jumbo Díaz; Juan Francisco; Junior García; Jeison Guzmán; Jhan Mariñez; Erick Mejia; Cristopher Mercedes; Johan Mieses; Gustavo Núñez; Yefri Pérez; Denyi Reyes; Julio Rodríguez; Ramón Rosso; Ángel Sánchez; Charlie Valerio	Dominican Republic	
Basketball	Men's	Bam Adebayo; Devin Booker; Kevin Durant; Jerami Grant; Draymond Green; Jrue Holiday; Keldon Johnson; Zach LaVine; Damian Lillard; JaVale McGee; Khris Middleton; Jayson Tatum	United States		Andrew Albicy; Nicolas Batum; Petr Cornelie; Nando de Colo; Moustapha Fall; Evan Fournier; Rudy Gobert; Thomas Heurtel; Timothé Luwawu-Cabarrot; Frank Ntilikina; Vincent Poirier; Guerschon Yabusele	France	Aron Baynes; Matthew Dellavedova; Dante Exum; Chris Goulding; Josh Green; Joe Ingles; Nick Kay; Jock Landale; Patty Mills; Duop Reath; Nathan Sobey; Matisse Thybulle	Australia	
Boxing	Men's flyweight	Galal Yafai	Great Britain		Carlo Paalam	Philippines	Ryomei Tanaka	Japan	
Boxing	Men's flyweight	Galal Yafai	Great Britain		Carlo Paalam	Philippines	Saken Bibossinov	Kazakhstan	
Boxing	Men's middleweight	Hebert Conceição	Brazil		Oleksandr Khyzhniak	Ukraine	Eumir Marcial	Philippines	
Boxing	Men's middleweight	Hebert Conceição	Brazil		Oleksandr Khyzhniak	Ukraine	Gleb Bakshi	ROC	
Boxing	Women's flyweight	Stoyka Krasteva	Bulgaria		Buse Naz Çakıroğlu	Turkey	Huang Hsiao-wen	Chinese Taipei	
Boxing	Women's flyweight	Stoyka Krasteva	Bulgaria		Buse Naz Çakıroğlu	Turkey	Tsukimi Namiki	Japan	
Boxing	Women's welterweight	Busenaz Sürmeneli	Turkey		Gu Hong	China	Lovlina Borgohain	India	
Boxing	Women's welterweight	Busenaz Sürmeneli	Turkey		Gu Hong	China	Oshae Jones	United States	
Canoeing	Men's C-1 1000m	Isaquias Queiroz	Brazil		Liu Hao	China	Serghei Tarnovschi	Moldova	
Canoeing	Men's K-4 500m	Max Rendschmidt; Ronald Rauhe; Tom Liebscher; Max Lemke	Germany		Saúl Craviotto; Marcus Walz; Carlos Arévalo; Rodrigo Germade	Spain	Samuel Baláž; Denis Myšák; Erik Vlček; Adam Botek	Slovakia	
Canoeing	Women's C-2 500m	Xu Shixiao; Sun Mengya	China		Liudmyla Luzan; Anastasiia Chetverikova	Ukraine	Laurence Vincent Lapointe; Katie Vincent	Canada	
Canoeing	Women's K-4 500m	Danuta Kozák; Tamara Csipes; Anna Kárász; Dóra Bodonyi	Hungary		Marharyta Makhneva; Nadzeya Papok; Volha Khudzenka; Maryna Litvinchuk	Belarus	Karolina Naja; Anna Puławska; Justyna Iskrzycka; Helena Wiśniewska	Poland	
Cycling	Men's Madison	Lasse Norman Hansen; Michael Mørkøv	Denmark		Ethan Hayter; Matthew Walls	Great Britain	Benjamin Thomas; Donavan Grondin	France	
Diving	Men's 10m platform	Cao Yuan	China		Yang Jian	China	Tom Daley	Great Britain	
Equestrian	Team jumping	Henrik von Eckermann; Malin Baryard-Johnsson; Peder Fredricson	Sweden		Laura Kraut; Jessica Springsteen; McLain Ward	United States	Pieter Devos; Jérôme Guery; Grégory Wathelet	Belgium	
Football	Men's	Abner; Dani Alves; Antony; Guilherme Arana; Brenno; Diego Carlos; Claudinho; Matheus Cunha; Bruno Fuchs; Ricardo Graça; Bruno Guimarães; Matheus Henrique; Lucão; Douglas Luiz; Malcom; Gabriel Martinelli; Gabriel Menino; Nino; Paulinho; Reinier; Richarlison; Santos	Brazil		Marco Asensio; Dani Ceballos; Marc Cucurella; Álvaro Fernández; Eric García; Bryan Gil; Óscar Gil; Mikel Merino; Óscar Mingueza; Rafa Mir; Juan Miranda; Jon Moncayola; Dani Olmo; Mikel Oyarzabal; Pedri; Javi Puado; Unai Simón; Carlos Soler; Pau Torres; Jesús Vallejo; Iván Villar; Martín Zubimendi	Spain	Eduardo Aguirre (footballer); Érick Aguirre; Roberto Alvarado; Jesús Angulo; Ricardo Angulo; Uriel Antuna; Fernando Beltrán; Sebastián Córdova; José Joaquín Esquivel; Sebastián Jurado; Diego Lainez; Vladimir Loroña; Adrián Mora; Luis Malagón; Henry Martín; César Montes; Guillermo Ochoa; Carlos Rodríguez; Luis Romo; Jorge Sánchez; Johan Vásquez; Alexis Vega	Mexico	
Golf	Women's	Nelly Korda	United States		Mone Inami	Japan	Lydia Ko	New Zealand	
Gymnastics	Rhythmic individual all-around	Linoy Ashram	Israel		Dina Averina	ROC	Alina Harnasko	Belarus	
Handball	Men's	Luc Abalo; Hugo Descat; Ludovic Fabregas; Yann Genty (GK); Vincent Gérard (GK); Michaël Guigou (C); Luka Karabatić; Nikola Karabatić; Romain Lagarde; Kentin Mahé; Dika Mem; Timothey N'Guessan; Valentin Porte; Nedim Remili; Melvyn Richardson; Nicolas Tournat	France		Lasse Andersson; Mathias Gidsel; Jóhan Hansen; Mikkel Hansen; Jacob Holm; Emil Jakobsen; Magnus Landin Jacobsen; Niklas Landin Jacobsen (C, GK); Mads Mensah Larsen; Kevin Møller (GK); Henrik Møllgaard; Morten Olsen; Magnus Saugstrup; Lasse Svan; Henrik Toft Hansen	Denmark	Julen Aguinagalde; Rodrigo Corrales; Alex Dujshebaev; Raúl Entrerríos; Ángel Fernández; Adrià Figueras; Antonio García Robledo; Aleix Gómez; Gedeón Guardiola; Eduardo Gurbindo; Jorge Maqueda; Viran Morros; Gonzalo Pérez de Vargas; Miguel Sánchez-Migallón; Daniel Sarmiento; Ferran Solé	Spain	
Karate	Men's +75kg	Sajjad Ganjzadeh	Iran		Tareg Hamedi	Saudi Arabia	Ryutaro Araga	Japan	
Karate	Men's +75kg	Sajjad Ganjzadeh	Iran		Tareg Hamedi	Saudi Arabia	Uğur Aktaş	Turkey	
Karate	Women's +61kg	Feryal Abdelaziz	Egypt		Irina Zaretska	Azerbaijan	Gong Li	China	
Karate	Women's +61kg	Feryal Abdelaziz	Egypt		Irina Zaretska	Azerbaijan	Sofya Berultseva	Kazakhstan	
Modern pentathlon	Men's	Joe Choong	Great Britain		Ahmed Elgendy	Egypt	Jun Woong-tae	South Korea	
Volleyball	Men's beach	Anders Mol; Christian Sørum	Norway		Viacheslav Krasilnikov; Oleg Stoyanovskiy	ROC	Cherif Younousse; Ahmed Tijan	Qatar	
Volleyball	Men's indoor	Barthélémy Chinenyeze; Jenia Grebennikov (L); Jean Patry; Benjamin Toniutti (c); Kévin Tillie; Earvin N'Gapeth; Antoine Brizard; Stéphen Boyer; Nicolas Le Goff; Daryl Bultor; Trévor Clévenot; Yacine Louati	France		Yaroslav Podlesnykh; Artem Volvich; Dmitry Volkov; Ivan Iakovlev; Denis Bogdan; Pavel Pankov; Viktor Poletaev; Maksim Mikhaylov; Egor Kliuka; Ilyas Kurkaev; Igor Kobzar (c); Valentin Golubev (L)	ROC	Matías Sánchez; Federico Pereyra; Cristian Poglajen; Facundo Conte; Agustín Loser; Santiago Danani (L); Sebastián Solé; Bruno Lima; Ezequiel Palacios; Luciano De Cecco (c); Nicolás Méndez; Martín Ramos	Argentina	
Water polo	Women's	Ashleigh Johnson (GK); Maddie Musselman; Melissa Seidemann; Rachel Fattal; Paige Hauschild; Maggie Steffens (C); Stephania Haralabidis (LH); Jamie Neushul; Aria Fischer; Kaleigh Gilchrist; Makenzie Fischer; Alys Williams; Amanda Longan (GK)	United States		Laura Ester (GK); Marta Bach; Anni Espar; Beatriz Ortiz; Elena Ruiz; Irene González; Clara Espar; Pili Peña (C, LH); Judith Forca (LH); Roser Tarragó; Maica García; Paula Leitón; Elena Sánchez (GK)	Spain	Edina Gangl (GK); Dorottya Szilágyi; Vanda Vályi; Gréta Gurisatti; Gabriella Szűcs; Rebecca Parkes; Anna Illés; Rita Keszthelyi (C); Dóra Leimeter (LH]); Anikó Gyöngyössy; Nataša Rybanská; Krisztina Garda; Alda Magyari (GK)	Hungary	
Wrestling	Men's freestyle 65kg	Takuto Otoguro	Japan		Haji Aliyev	Azerbaijan	Gadzhimurad Rashidov	ROC	
Wrestling	Men's freestyle 65kg	Takuto Otoguro	Japan		Haji Aliyev	Azerbaijan	Bajrang Punia	India	
Wrestling	Men's freestyle 97kg	Abdulrashid Sadulaev	ROC		Kyle Snyder	United States	Reineris Salas	Cuba	
Wrestling	Men's freestyle 97kg	Abdulrashid Sadulaev	ROC		Kyle Snyder	United States	Abraham Conyedo	Italy	
Wrestling	Women's freestyle 50kg	Yui Susaki	Japan		Sun Yanan	China	Mariya Stadnik	Azerbaijan	
Wrestling	Women's freestyle 50kg	Yui Susaki	Japan		Sun Yanan	China	Sarah Hildebrandt	United States	

=== Day 16: 8 August ===
Closing ceremony

- At Japan National Stadium. It included the traditional Olympic flag handover to Paris, France, the host city of the next Summer Olympics in 2024.

Sport	Event	Gold medalist(s)			Silver medalist(s)		Bronze medalist(s)		Ref
Sport	Event	Competitor(s)	Team	Rec	Competitor(s)	Team	Competitor(s)	Team	Ref
Athletics	Men's marathon	Eliud Kipchoge	Kenya		Abdi Nageeye	Netherlands	Bashir Abdi	Belgium	
Basketball	Women's	Jewell Loyd; Skylar Diggins-Smith; Sue Bird; Ariel Atkins; Chelsea Gray; A'ja Wilson; Breanna Stewart; Napheesa Collier; Diana Taurasi; Sylvia Fowles; Tina Charles; Brittney Griner	United States		Moeko Nagaoka; Maki Takada; Naho Miyoshi; Rui Machida; Nako Motohashi; Nanaka Todo; Saki Hayashi; Evelyn Mawuli; Saori Miyazaki; Yuki Miyazawa; Himawari Akaho; Monica Okoye	Japan	Alexia Chartereau; Héléna Ciak; Alix Duchet; Marine Fauthoux; Sandrine Gruda; Marine Johannès; Sarah Michel; Endéné Miyem; Iliana Rupert; Diandra Tchatchouang; Valériane Vukosavljević; Gabby Williams	France	
Boxing	Men's lightweight	Andy Cruz	Cuba		Keyshawn Davis	United States	Hovhannes Bachkov	Armenia	
Boxing	Men's lightweight	Andy Cruz	Cuba		Keyshawn Davis	United States	Harry Garside	Australia	
Boxing	Men's super heavyweight	Bakhodir Jalolov	Uzbekistan		Richard Torrez	United States	Frazer Clarke	Great Britain	
Boxing	Men's super heavyweight	Bakhodir Jalolov	Uzbekistan		Richard Torrez	United States	Kamshybek Kunkabayev	Kazakhstan	
Boxing	Women's lightweight	Kellie Harrington	Ireland		Beatriz Ferreira	Brazil	Sudaporn Seesondee	Thailand	
Boxing	Women's lightweight	Kellie Harrington	Ireland		Beatriz Ferreira	Brazil	Mira Potkonen	Finland	
Boxing	Women's middleweight	Lauren Price	Great Britain		Li Qian	China	Nouchka Fontijn	Netherlands	
Boxing	Women's middleweight	Lauren Price	Great Britain		Li Qian	China	Zemfira Magomedalieva	ROC	
Cycling	Men's keirin	Jason Kenny	Great Britain		Azizulhasni Awang	Malaysia	Harrie Lavreysen	Netherlands	
Cycling	Women's omnium	Jennifer Valente	United States		Yumi Kajihara	Japan	Kirsten Wild	Netherlands	
Cycling	Women's sprint	Kelsey Mitchell	Canada		Olena Starikova	Ukraine	Lee Wai-sze	Hong Kong	
Gymnastics	Rhythmic group all-around	Simona Dyankova; Stefani Kiryakova; Madlen Radukanova; Laura Traets; Erika Zafirova	Bulgaria		Anastasiia Bliznyuk; Anastasiia Maksimova; Angelina Shkatova; Anastasiia Tatareva; Alisa Tishchenko	ROC	Martina Centofanti; Agnese Duranti; Alessia Maurelli; Daniela Mogurean; Martina Santandrea	Italy	
Handball	Women's	Méline Nocandy; Blandine Dancette; Pauline Coatanea; Chloé Valentini; Allison Pineau; Coralie Lassource (c); Grâce Zaadi Deuna; Amandine Leynaud (GK); Kalidiatou Niakaté; Cléopatre Darleux (GK); Océane Sercien-Ugolin; Laura Flippes; Béatrice Edwige; Pauletta Foppa; Estelle Nze Minko; Alexandra Lacrabère	France		Anna Sedoykina (GK); Polina Kuznetsova; Polina Gorshkova; Daria Dmitrieva (c); Anna Sen; Anna Vyakhireva; Polina Vedekhina; Vladlena Bobrovnikova; Kseniya Makeyeva; Elena Mikhaylichenko; Olga Fomina; Ekaterina Ilina; Yulia Managarova; Antonina Skorobogatchenko; Victoriya Kalinina (GK)	ROC	Henny Reistad; Veronica Kristiansen; Marit Malm Frafjord; Stine Skogrand; Nora Mørk; Stine Bredal Oftedal (c); Silje Solberg (GK); Kari Brattset Dale; Katrine Lunde (GK); Marit Røsberg Jacobsen; Camilla Herrem; Sanna Solberg-Isaksen; Kristine Breistøl; Marta Tomac; Vilde Johansen	Norway	
Volleyball	Women's indoor	Micha Hancock; Jordyn Poulter; Justine Wong-Orantes (L); Jordan Larson (c); Annie Drews; Jordan Thompson; Michelle Bartsch-Hackley; Kim Hill; Foluke Akinradewo; Haleigh Washington; Kelsey Robinson; Chiaka Ogbogu	United States		Carol Gattaz; Rosamaria Montibeller; Macris Carneiro; Roberta Ratzke; Gabriela Guimarães; Tandara Caixeta; Natália Pereira (c); Ana Carolina da Silva; Fernanda Garay; Ana Cristina de Souza; Camila Brait (L); Ana Beatriz Corrêa	Brazil	Bianka Buša; Mina Popović; Slađana Mirković; Brankica Mihajlović; Maja Ognjenović (c); Ana Bjelica; Maja Aleksić; Milena Rašić; Silvija Popović (L); Tijana Bošković; Bojana Milenković; Jelena Blagojević	Serbia	
Water polo	Men's	Milan Aleksić; Nikola Dedović; Filip Filipović; Nikola Jakšić; Đorđe Lazić; Dušan Mandić; Branislav Mitrović; Stefan Mitrović; Duško Pijetlović; Gojko Pijetlović; Andrija Prlainović; Sava Ranđelović; Strahinja Rašović	Serbia		Stylianos Argyropoulos; Georgios Dervisis; Ioannis Fountoulis; Konstantinos Galanidis; Konstantinos Genidounias; Konstantinos Gkiouvetsis; Marios Kapotsis; Christodoulos Kolomvos; Konstantinos Mourikis; Alexandros Papanastasiou; Dimitrios Skoumpakis; Angelos Vlachopoulos; Emmanouil Zerdevas	Greece	Dániel Angyal; Balázs Erdélyi; Balázs Hárai; Norbert Hosnyánszky; Szilárd Jansik; Krisztián Manhercz; Tamás Mezei; Viktor Nagy; Mátyás Pásztor; Márton Vámos; Dénes Varga; Soma Vogel; Gergő Zalánki	Hungary	
