= 2022 World Taekwondo Championships – Men's middleweight =

Taekwondo competitions

Men's middleweight at the 2022 World Championships
- Venue: Centro Acuático CODE Metropolitano
- Dates: 15 November 2022
- Competitors: 41 from 40 nations

Medalists
gold medal	Mehdi Khodabakhshi	Serbia
silver medal	Meng Mingkuan	China
bronze medal	Nikita Rafalovich	Uzbekistan
bronze medal	Bryan Salazar	Mexico

The men's middleweight is a competition featured at the 2022 World Taekwondo Championships, and was held at the Centro Acuático CODE Metropolitano in Guadalajara, Mexico on 15 November 2022. Middleweights were limited to a maximum of 87 kilograms in body mass.

== Results ==
Legend

- DQ — Won by disqualification

=== Finals ===
Semifinals			Final
Mehdi Khodabakhshi (SRB)	6	3
Nikita Rafalovich (UZB)	3	2	Mehdi Khodabakhshi (SRB)	1	5
Bryan Salazar (MEX)	0	1	Meng Mingkuan (CHN)	0	4
Meng Mingkuan (CHN)	0	7

=== Top half ===
==== Section 1 ====
Round of 64
Guillermo Pérez (CUB)	2	0
Abolfazl Abbasi (IRI)	11	13
Daniel Dasent-Thomson (TTO)	D	Q
~~Paivou Gomis (GBS)~~
~~Frédéric Hongbe Adoua (CHA)~~
Erik Farmakas (SWE)	D	Q

Round of 32
Ícaro Miguel Soares (BRA)	3	2
Abolfazl Abbasi (IRI)	3	6
Mehdi Khodabakhshi (SRB)	0	8
Taleh Suleymanov (AZE)	0	4
Raúl Martínez (ESP)	7	4
Daniel Dasent-Thomson (TTO)	1	0
Erik Farmakas (SWE)	2	3	3
Jordan Stewart (CAN)	2	2	6

Round of 16
Abolfazl Abbasi (IRI)	1	8
Mehdi Khodabakhshi (SRB)	3	8
Raúl Martínez (ESP)	3	1	2
Jordan Stewart (CAN)	2	4	5

Quarterfinals
Mehdi Khodabakhshi (SRB)	2	3
Jordan Stewart (CAN)	1	3

==== Section 2 ====
Round of 64
~~Ibrahima Bah (GUI)~~	D	Q
~~Innocent Wafula (KEN)~~	D	Q
~~Niraj Deuba (NEP)~~	D	Q
~~Amed Sama (GHA)~~	D	Q

Round of 32
Patrik Divkovič (SLO)
Bye
Adrian Wojtkowiak (POL)	9	4	4
Nikita Rafalovich (UZB)	10	3	8
Filip Dodevski (MKD)	0	1	6
Soufiane El-Asbi (MAR)	0	5	3
Bye
Ahmad Rawy (EGY)

Round of 16
Patrik Divkovič (SLO)	3	5	1
Nikita Rafalovich (UZB)	4	1	1
Filip Dodevski (MKD)	1	7
Ahmad Rawy (EGY)	1	4

Quarterfinals
Nikita Rafalovich (UZB)	11	5
Filip Dodevski (MKD)	0	4

=== Bottom half ===
==== Section 3 ====
Round of 64
Chang Yu-ling (TPE)	11	8	5
Jahn Estrada (PUR)	5	9	1
Luis Soto (COL)	D	Q
~~Denilson Seraphin (HAI)~~

Round of 32
Bryan Salazar (MEX)	4	2	3
Chang Yu-ling (TPE)	4	0	2
Vladyslav Bondar (UKR)	1	4
Enbiya Taha Biçer (TUR)	8	7
Cheick Sallah Cissé (CIV)	3	1	4
Lee Seon-gi (KOR)	0	2	1
Luis Soto (COL)	5	2	3
Smaiyl Duisebay (KAZ)	0	2	6

Round of 16
Bryan Salazar (MEX)	4	10
Enbiya Taha Biçer (TUR)	4	9
Cheick Sallah Cissé (CIV)	4	7
Smaiyl Duisebay (KAZ)	1	3

Quarterfinals
Bryan Salazar (MEX)	2	4	5
Cheick Sallah Cissé (CIV)	7	1	3

==== Section 4 ====
Round of 64
~~Amadou Soumaila (NIG)~~
Miguel Ferrera (HON)	D	Q
Ioannis Papadopoulos (GRE)	2	6	3
Mohammad Emami (RTA)	3	1	5

Round of 32
Fahed Ammar Sbeihi (JOR)	13	13
Miguel Ferrera (HON)	5	8
Arash Mozhdeh (AUS)	1	2
Roberto Botta (ITA)	6	5
Meng Mingkuan (CHN)	4	9
Michael Rodriguez (USA)	3	0
Mohammad Emami (RTA)	0	3
Ivan Šapina (CRO)	5	8

Round of 16
Fahed Ammar Sbeihi (JOR)	3	10	8
Roberto Botta (ITA)	8	7	6
Meng Mingkuan (CHN)	5	0	4
Ivan Šapina (CRO)	1	7	2

Quarterfinals
Fahed Ammar Sbeihi (JOR)	3	4
Meng Mingkuan (CHN)	11	12
