= 2019 World Taekwondo Championships – Men's middleweight =

Men's middleweight at the 2019 World Championships
- Venue: Manchester Arena
- Dates: 19 May 2019
- Competitors: 36 from 36 nations

Medalists
gold medal	Vladislav Larin	Russia
silver medal	Ícaro Miguel Soares	Brazil
bronze medal	Song Zhaoxiang	China
bronze medal	Ivan Šapina	Croatia

The men's middleweight is a competition featured at the 2019 World Taekwondo Championships, and was held at the Manchester Arena in Manchester, United Kingdom on 19 May. Heavyweights were limited to a maximum of 87 kilograms in body mass.

== Results ==
Legend

- W — Won by withdrawal

=== Finals ===
Semifinals		Final
Vladislav Larin (RUS)	18
Song Zhaoxiang (CHN)	12	Vladislav Larin (RUS)	19
Ivan Šapina (CRO)	12	Ícaro Miguel Soares (BRA)	9
Ícaro Miguel Soares (BRA)	16

=== Top half ===
==== Section 1 ====
Round of 64
Khaidem Neblett (TTO)	4
Maksim Rafalovich (UZB)	26

Round of 32
Vladislav Larin (RUS)	6
Maksim Rafalovich (UZB)	2
Iván García (ESP)	7
Hasan Can Lazoğlu (TUR)	6
Seydou Gbané (CIV)	10
Filip Dodevski (MKD)	8
Mikołaj Szaferski (POL)	14
Lee Meng-en (TPE)	8

Round of 16
Vladislav Larin (RUS)	16
Iván García (ESP)	5
Seydou Gbané (CIV)	29
Mikołaj Szaferski (POL)	14

Quarterfinals
Vladislav Larin (RUS)	14
Seydou Gbané (CIV)	6

==== Section 2 ====
Round of 64
Sheron Fernando (SRI)	5
Song Zhaoxiang (CHN)	25

Round of 32
Smaiyl Duisebay (KAZ)	16
Farkhod Negmatov (TJK)	6
Adrian Spellen (GUY)	4
Vladyslav Bondar (UKR)	13
Anas Sadek (JOR)	13
Arash Mozhdeh (AUS)	6
Song Zhaoxiang (CHN)	W
Lutalo Muhammad (GBR)

Round of 16
Smaiyl Duisebay (KAZ)	13
Vladyslav Bondar (UKR)	2
Anas Sadek (JOR)	13
Song Zhaoxiang (CHN)	16

Quarterfinals
Smaiyl Duisebay (KAZ)	11
Song Zhaoxiang (CHN)	12

=== Bottom half ===
==== Section 3 ====
Round of 64
Tiago Gomes (POR)	21
Viktoras Pilavas (CYP)	10

Round of 32
Ivan Trajkovič (SLO)	15
Tiago Gomes (POR)	6
Lee Seon-gi (KOR)	4
Ivan Šapina (CRO)	19
Ramin Azizov (AZE)	8
Barys Smychkou (BLR)	5
Kristmundur Gíslason (ISL)	6
Jordan Stewart (CAN)	14

Round of 16
Ivan Trajkovič (SLO)	8
Ivan Šapina (CRO)	10
Ramin Azizov (AZE)	14
Jordan Stewart (CAN)	13

Quarterfinals
Ivan Šapina (CRO)	13
Ramin Azizov (AZE)	7

==== Section 4 ====
Round of 64
Hamza Bibsi (MAR)	27
Ray Rahi (LBN)	10

Round of 32
Ícaro Miguel Soares (BRA)	23
Gabriel Díaz (PUR)	14
Fernando Baeza (CHI)	23
Hanssel Llanos (USA)	15
Draško Jovanov (SRB)	11
Christoforos Kallifonis (GRE)	1
Hamza Bibsi (MAR)	5
Alexander Bachmann (GER)	25

Round of 16
Ícaro Miguel Soares (BRA)	7
Fernando Baeza (CHI)	4
Draško Jovanov (SRB)	12
Alexander Bachmann (GER)	15

Quarterfinals
Ícaro Miguel Soares (BRA)	19
Alexander Bachmann (GER)	4
