= North Macedonia at the 2020 Summer Olympics =

- IOC code: MKD
- NOC: Olympic Committee of North Macedonia
- Website: www.mok.org.mk (in Macedonian)

in Tokyo, Japan 23 July 2021 – 8 August 2021
- Competitors: 8 in 7 sports
- Flag bearers (opening): Arbresha Rexhepi; Dejan Georgievski
- Flag bearer (closing): Magomedgadji Nurov
- Medals Ranked 77th: Gold 0 Silver 1 Bronze 0 Total 1

Summer Olympics appearances (overview)
- 1996; 2000; 2004; 2008; 2012; 2016; 2020; 2024

Other related appearances
- Yugoslavia (1920–1988); Independent Olympic Participants (1992)

North Macedonia competed at the 2020 Summer Olympics in Tokyo. Originally scheduled to take place from 24 July to 9 August 2020, the Games were postponed to 23 July to 8 August 2021, because of the COVID-19 pandemic. It was the nation's seventh consecutive appearance at the Summer Olympics and the first under the country's new name. North Macedonia won their first ever silver medal, won by Dejan Georgievski in the Men's +80 kg event in Taekwondo, with the nation having previously only received a bronze medal.

== Medalists ==
Medal	Name	Sport	Event	Date
Silver	Dejan Georgievski	Taekwondo	Men's +80 kg	27 July

== Competitors ==
The following is the list of number of competitors in the Games.

Sport	Men	Women	Total
Athletics	1	0	1
Judo	0	1	1
Karate	0	1	1
Shooting	1	0	1
Swimming	1	1	2
Taekwondo	1	0	1
Wrestling	1	0	1
Total	5	3	8

== Athletics ==
North Macedonia received a universality slot from the World Athletics to send a male track athlete.

Key

- Note–Ranks given for track events are within the athlete's heat only
- Q = Qualified for the next round
- q = Qualified for the next round as a fastest loser or, in field events, by position without achieving the qualifying target
- NR = National record
- N/A = Round not applicable for the event
- Bye = Athlete not required to compete in round

Track & road events

Athlete	Event	Heat		Semifinal		Final	
Athlete	Event	Result	Rank	Result	Rank	Result	Rank
Jovan Stojoski	Men's 400 m	46.81	7	Did not advance			

== Judo ==
North Macedonia entered one female judoka after International Judo Federation awarded them a tripartite invitation quota.

Athlete	Event	Round of 32	Round of 16	Quarterfinals	Semifinals	Repechage	Final / BM	
Athlete	Event	Opposition Result	Opposition Result	Opposition Result	Opposition Result	Opposition Result	Opposition Result	Rank
Arbresha Rexhepi	Women's −52 kg	Giles (GBR); L 00–11	Did not advance					

== Karate ==
North Macedonia received an invitation from the Tripartite Commission to send Puleksenija Jovanoska in the women's kata event.

Kata

Athlete	Event	Elimination round		Ranking round		Final / BM	
Athlete	Event	Score	Rank	Score	Rank	Opposition Result	Rank
Puleksenija Jovanoska	Women's kata	23.90	5	Did not advance			

== Shooting ==
North Macedonia received an invitation from the Tripartite Commission to send a men's air pistol shooter.

Athlete	Event	Qualification		Final	
Athlete	Event	Points	Rank	Points	Rank
Borjan Brankovski	Men's 10 m air pistol	573	21	Did not advance	

== Swimming ==
North Macedonia received universality invitations from FINA to send two top-ranked swimmers (one per gender) in their respective individual events, based on the FINA Points System of June 28, 2021.

Athlete	Event	Heat		Semifinal		Final	
Athlete	Event	Time	Rank	Time	Rank	Time	Rank
Filip Derkoski	Men's 400 m freestyle	4:03.34	36	—N/a		Did not advance	
Mia Blaževska Eminova	Women's 100 m freestyle	57.19	40	Did not advance			

== Taekwondo ==
North Macedonia entered one athlete into the taekwondo competition at the Games for the first time in history. Dejan Georgievski secured a spot in the men's heavyweight category (+80 kg) with a top two finish at the 2021 European Qualification Tournament in Sofia, Bulgaria.

Athlete	Event	Round of 16	Quarterfinals	Semifinals	Repechage	Final / BM	
Athlete	Event	Opposition Result	Opposition Result	Opposition Result	Opposition Result	Opposition Result	Rank
Dejan Georgievski	Men's +80 kg	Alba (CUB); W 11–8	Gbané (CIV); W 9–4	In K-d (KOR); W 12–6	Bye	Larin (ROC); L 9–15	2nd place, silver medalist(s)

== Wrestling ==
For the first time since Beijing 2008, North Macedonia qualified one wrestler for the men's freestyle 97 kg, as a result of a top six finish at the 2019 World Championships.

Key:

- VT (ranking points: 5–0 or 0–5) – Victory by fall.
- VB (ranking points: 5–0 or 0–5) – Victory by injury (VF for forfeit, VA for withdrawal or disqualification)
- PP (ranking points: 3–1 or 1–3) – Decision by points – the loser with technical points.
- PO (ranking points: 3–0 or 0–3) – Decision by points – the loser without technical points.
- ST (ranking points: 4–0 or 0–4) – Great superiority – the loser without technical points and a margin of victory of at least 8 (Greco-Roman) or 10 (freestyle) points.
- SP (ranking points: 4–1 or 1–4) – Technical superiority – the loser with technical points and a margin of victory of at least 8 (Greco-Roman) or 10 (freestyle) points.

Freestyle

Athlete	Event	Round of 16	Quarterfinal	Semifinal	Repechage	Final / BM	
Athlete	Event	Opposition Result	Opposition Result	Opposition Result	Opposition Result	Opposition Result	Rank
Magomedgadzhi Nurov	Men's −97 kg	Saadaoui (TUN); W 3–0 ^{PO}	Salas (CUB); L 1–3 ^{PO}	Did not advance			9
