= Taekwondo at the 2020 Summer Olympics =

Taekwondo at the Games of the XXXII Olympiad
- Venue: Makuhari Messe
- Dates: 24–27 July 2021
- No. of events: 8
- Competitors: 132 from 62 nations

Taekwondo was a sport at the 2020 Summer Olympics in Tokyo, and featured 128 taekwondo fighters competing in eight weight categories; four for men, and four for women. The 2020 Summer Olympics were postponed to 2021 due to the COVID-19 pandemic.

== Qualification ==
Taekwondo competition at these Games featured a total of 128 athletes, 64 males and 64 females, and 16 in each of the eight weight categories. Each National Olympic Committee (NOC) was allowed to enter up to one competitor per event, resulting in a maximum of eight competitors, four of each gender. In each weight class, five quota spots were available through World Taekwondo (WT) Olympic rankings, one quota spot was available through the WT Grand Slam Champions Series, nine quota spots were available through continental qualification events (two per continent, except Oceania with one), and quota spot was available either to the host (four classes chosen by the host, two per gender) or as a Tripartite Commission invitation (the remaining four classes).

If an NOC had qualified at least two female or male athletes through ranking, it could not participate in the respective Continental Qualification Tournament unless it relinquished the places obtained through ranking. This included the host, Japan, with its automatic qualification of two women and two men.

== Schedule ==
Schedule
Event↓/Date →	Jul 24	Jul 25	Jul 26	Jul 27
Men's 58 kg	F			
Men's 68 kg		F		
Men's 80 kg			F	
Men's +80 kg				F
Women's 49 kg	F			
Women's 57 kg		F		
Women's 67 kg			F	
Women's +67 kg				F

== Participating ==
=== Events by gender ===
Weights	1	2	3	4
Men's	16	17	16	16
Women's	17	17	16	16

== Medal summary ==
The 2020 Summer Olympics marked the first time that South Korea, which usually dominated the sport at the Olympics, had not won an Olympic gold medal in Taekwondo since the sport debuted in the 2000 Olympics.

=== Medal table ===
Rank	NOC	Gold	Silver	Bronze	Total
1	ROC	2	1	1	4
2	Croatia	1	0	1	2
2	Serbia	1	0	1	2
4	Italy	1	0	0	1
4	Thailand	1	0	0	1
4	United States	1	0	0	1
4	Uzbekistan	1	0	0	1
8	Great Britain	0	2	1	3
9	South Korea	0	1	2	3
10	Jordan	0	1	0	1
10	North Macedonia	0	1	0	1
10	Spain	0	1	0	1
10	Tunisia	0	1	0	1
14	Egypt	0	0	2	2
14	Turkey	0	0	2	2
16	China	0	0	1	1
16	Chinese Taipei	0	0	1	1
16	Cuba	0	0	1	1
16	France	0	0	1	1
16	Israel	0	0	1	1
16	Ivory Coast	0	0	1	1
Totals (21 entries)		8	8	16	32

=== Men's events ===
Event	Gold	Silver	Bronze
Flyweight (58 kg)	Vito Dell'Aquila; Italy	Mohamed Khalil Jendoubi; Tunisia	Jang Jun; South Korea
Flyweight (58 kg)	Vito Dell'Aquila; Italy	Mohamed Khalil Jendoubi; Tunisia	Mikhail Artamonov; ROC
Featherweight (68 kg)	Ulugbek Rashitov; Uzbekistan	Bradly Sinden; Great Britain	Hakan Reçber; Turkey
Featherweight (68 kg)	Ulugbek Rashitov; Uzbekistan	Bradly Sinden; Great Britain	Zhao Shuai; China
Welterweight (80 kg)	Maksim Khramtsov; ROC	Saleh El-Sharabaty; Jordan	Toni Kanaet; Croatia
Welterweight (80 kg)	Maksim Khramtsov; ROC	Saleh El-Sharabaty; Jordan	Seif Eissa; Egypt
Heavyweight (+80 kg)	Vladislav Larin; ROC	Dejan Georgievski; North Macedonia	In Kyo-don; South Korea
Heavyweight (+80 kg)	Vladislav Larin; ROC	Dejan Georgievski; North Macedonia	Rafael Alba; Cuba

=== Women's events ===
Event	Gold	Silver	Bronze
Flyweight (49 kg)	Panipak Wongpattanakit; Thailand	Adriana Cerezo; Spain	Tijana Bogdanović; Serbia
Flyweight (49 kg)	Panipak Wongpattanakit; Thailand	Adriana Cerezo; Spain	Avishag Semberg; Israel
Featherweight (57 kg)	Anastasija Zolotic; United States	Tatiana Minina; ROC	Lo Chia-ling; Chinese Taipei
Featherweight (57 kg)	Anastasija Zolotic; United States	Tatiana Minina; ROC	Hatice Kübra İlgün; Turkey
Welterweight (67 kg)	Matea Jelić; Croatia	Lauren Williams; Great Britain	Ruth Gbagbi; Ivory Coast
Welterweight (67 kg)	Matea Jelić; Croatia	Lauren Williams; Great Britain	Hedaya Wahba; Egypt
Heavyweight (+67 kg)	Milica Mandić; Serbia	Lee Da-bin; South Korea	Althéa Laurin; France
Heavyweight (+67 kg)	Milica Mandić; Serbia	Lee Da-bin; South Korea	Bianca Walkden; Great Britain

== See also ==
- Taekwondo at the 2019 Pan American Games
- Taekwondo at the 2020 Summer Paralympics
