= 2017 World Taekwondo Championships – Men's middleweight =

Taekwondo competition

Men's middleweight at the 2017 World Championships
- Venue: Taekwondowon
- Dates: 28–29 June 2017
- Competitors: 49 from 49 nations

Medalists
gold medal	Alexander Bachmann	Germany
silver medal	Vladislav Larin	Russia
bronze medal	In Kyo-don	South Korea
bronze medal	Ivan Trajkovič	Slovenia

The men's middleweight is a competition featured at the 2017 World Taekwondo Championships, and was held at the Taekwondowon in Muju County, South Korea on June 28 and June 29. Middleweights were limited to a maximum of 87 kilograms in body mass.

== Results ==
Legend

- DQ — Won by disqualification
- P — Won by punitive declaration
- W — Won by withdrawal

=== Finals ===
Semifinals		Final
Vladislav Larin (RUS)	8
In Kyo-don (KOR)	6	Vladislav Larin (RUS)	9
Alexander Bachmann (GER)	15	Alexander Bachmann (GER)	11
Ivan Trajkovič (SLO)	13

=== Top half ===
==== Section 1 ====
Round of 64
~~Adrian Spelling (GUY)~~
Davronbek Azimov (UZB)	DQ
Dafydd Sanders (NZL)	5
Saeid Rajabi (IRI)	25
Akshay Hooda (IND)	4
Rafael Alba (CUB)	25
Fronzie Charles (GRN)	1
Lutalo Muhammad (GBR)	36
Karamoko Soumaré (MLI)	4^{W}
Md Muslam Mia (BAN)	0

Round of 32
Vladislav Larin (RUS)	21
Davronbek Azimov (UZB)	6
Saeid Rajabi (IRI)	14
Rafael Alba (CUB)	11
Smaiyl Duisebay (KAZ)	21^{P}
Lutalo Muhammad (GBR)	6
Karamoko Soumaré (MLI)	28
Carlos Rivas (VEN)	14

Round of 16
Vladislav Larin (RUS)	20
Saeid Rajabi (IRI)	4
Smaiyl Duisebay (KAZ)	11
Karamoko Soumaré (MLI)	16

Quarterfinals
Vladislav Larin (RUS)	22
Karamoko Soumaré (MLI)	7

==== Section 2 ====
Round of 64
Liu Jintao (CHN)	19
Ícaro Miguel Soares (BRA)	17
Vladyslav Bondar (UKR)	DQ
~~Simon Ahhim (SAM)~~
~~Khaidem Neblett (TTO)~~
Daniel Safstrom (AUS)	DQ
Lo Chih-chun (TPE)	27
Shaksham Karki (NEP)	6

Round of 32
Daniel Ros (ESP)	31
Liu Jintao (CHN)	23
Vladyslav Bondar (UKR)	9
Draško Jovanov (SRB)	19
Jeroen Wanrooij (NED)	14
Daniel Safstrom (AUS)	7
Lo Chih-chun (TPE)	8
In Kyo-don (KOR)	16

Round of 16
Daniel Ros (ESP)	24
Draško Jovanov (SRB)	16
Jeroen Wanrooij (NED)	1
In Kyo-don (KOR)	16

Quarterfinals
Daniel Ros (ESP)	3
In Kyo-don (KOR)	5

=== Bottom half ===
==== Section 3 ====
Round of 64
Marko Stević (MKD)	23
Craig Brown (JAM)	20
Dinko Šegedin (CRO)	DQ
~~Zafer Al-Amari (SYR)~~
Antis Constantinou (CYP)
Matteo Milani (ITA)	W
Armin Gredić (BIH)	23
Hasan Can Lazoğlu (TUR)	21

Round of 32
Alexander Bachmann (GER)	21
Marko Stević (MKD)	2
Dinko Šegedin (CRO)	18^{P}
Bartosz Kołecki (POL)	11
Bryan Salazar (MEX)	19
Matteo Milani (ITA)	3
Armin Gredić (BIH)	18
Jordan Stewart (CAN)	17

Round of 16
Alexander Bachmann (GER)	17
Dinko Šegedin (CRO)	7
Bryan Salazar (MEX)	10
Armin Gredić (BIH)	6

Quarterfinals
Alexander Bachmann (GER)	12
Bryan Salazar (MEX)	7

==== Section 4 ====
Round of 64
~~Amadou Dièye (SEN)~~
Arman Yeremyan (ARM)	DQ
Christian Suh (USA)	24^{P}
Abram Cuvinar (PHI)	12
~~Eric Onen (UGA)~~
Waldeck Defaix (FPO)	DQ
Christoforos Kallifonis (GRE)	22^{W}
Omar Chehade (SWE)	8

Round of 32
Ivan Trajkovič (SLO)	16
Arman Yeremyan (ARM)	8
Christian Suh (USA)	31
Seydou Gbané (CIV)	27
Ramin Azizov (AZE)	16
Waldeck Defaix (FPO)	4
Christoforos Kallifonis (GRE)	9
Yassine Trabelsi (TUN)	15

Round of 16
Ivan Trajkovič (SLO)	26
Christian Suh (USA)	5
Ramin Azizov (AZE)	10
Yassine Trabelsi (TUN)	9

Quarterfinals
Ivan Trajkovič (SLO)	22
Ramin Azizov (AZE)	15
