= Song Zhaoxiang =

Chinese taekwondo practitioner

Personal information
- Born: January 29, 1997 (age 29)

Sport
- Country: China
- Sport: Taekwondo
Medal record
Men's taekwondo
Representing China
World Championships
Bronze medal – third place	2019 Manchester	87 kg
Bronze medal – third place	2022 Guadalajara	+87 kg
Grand Prix
Bronze medal – third place	2023 Rome	+80 kg
Grand Slam
Bronze medal – third place	2018 Wuxi	+80 kg
Asian Games
Gold medal – first place	2022 Hangzhou	+80 kg
Asian Championships
Gold medal – first place	2022 Chuncheon	+87 kg

Song Zhaoxiang is a Chinese taekwondo practitioner. He is a two-time bronze medalist at the World Taekwondo Championships. He won the gold medal in the men's +80 kg event at the 2022 Asian Games held in Hangzhou, China.

In 2019, he won one of the bronze medals in the men's middleweight event at the World Taekwondo Championships held in Manchester, United Kingdom. In the same year, he also won one of the bronze medals in the men's event at the 2019 World Cup Taekwondo Team Championships held in Wuxi, China.
