= Sun Hongyi =

Chinese taekwondo practitioner

Sun Hongyi (born 28 July 1993) is a Chinese taekwondo practitioner.

== Personal life ==
He began the sport in 2007 at a school in Hulunbuir, before attending Beijing Sport University.

== Career ==
He reached the quarter-finals at the 2018 Asia Games. He competed at the 2019 World Championship in Manchester. He was selected for the Taekwondo at the 2020 Summer Olympics – Men's +80 kg after he won the Asian Olympic Qualification Tournament in Amman, Jordan in May 2021.
