= Taekwondo at the 2019 Pan American Games – Men's 80 kg =

Taekwondo – Men's 80 kg at the 2019 Pan American Games
- Venue: Polideportivo Callao
- Dates: July 29
- Competitors: 13 from 13 nations

Medalists
Gold medal	Miguel Trejos; Colombia
Silver medal	Ícaro Miguel Soares; Brazil
Bronze medal	José Cobas; Cuba
Bronze medal	Moisés Hernández; Dominican Republic

The men's 80 kg competition of the taekwondo events at the 2019 Pan American Games took place on July 29 at the Polideportivo Callao.

== Results ==
=== Main bracket ===
The final results were:

Preliminary round
Darlyn Padilla (ECU)	2
José Cobas (CUB)	22
René Lizárraga (MEX)	22
Jonatan Rodriguez (URU)	2
Miguel Trejos (COL)	34
Franco Aurora (PER)	13
Carlos Rivas (VEN)	8
Elvis Barbosa (PUR)	14
Christopher Iliesco (CAN)	8
Miguel Ferrera (HON)	8

Quarterfinals
Thomas Rahimi (USA)	3
José Cobas (CUB)	11
René Lizárraga (MEX)	6
Miguel Trejos (COL)	7
Ícaro Miguel Soares (BRA)	21
Elvis Barbosa (PUR)	17
Miguel Ferrera (HON)	7
Moisés Hernández (DOM)	15

Semifinals
José Cobas (CUB)	19
Miguel Trejos (COL)	22
Ícaro Miguel Soares (BRA)	1
Moisés Hernández (DOM)	0

Gold medal match
Miguel Trejos (COL)	19
Ícaro Miguel Soares (BRA)	17

=== Repechage ===
Bronze medal match
José Cobas (CUB)	12
Elvis Barbosa (PUR)	7

Semifinal			Bronze medal match
			1	Moisés Hernández (DOM)	8
2	Franco Aurora (PER)	5		René Lizárraga (MEX)	5
3	René Lizárraga (MEX)	14
