= Taekwondo at the 2022 Asian Games – Men's +80 kg =

Taekwondo competition

Men's +80 kg at the 2022 Asian Games
- Venue: Lin'an Sports and Culture Centre
- Date: 28 September 2023
- Competitors: 15 from 15 nations

Medalists
gold medal	Song Zhaoxiang	China
silver medal	Arian Salimi	Iran
bronze medal	Lee Meng-en	Chinese Taipei
bronze medal	Smaiyl Duisebay	Kazakhstan

The men's +80 kilograms event at the 2022 Asian Games took place on 28 September 2023 at Lin'an Sports and Culture Centre, Hangzhou, China.

Song Zhaoxiang from China won the gold medal becoming the first ever Chinese male athlete in Taekwondo to win an Asian Games gold medal in an individual event.

== Schedule ==
All times are China Standard Time (UTC+08:00)

Date	Time	Event
Thursday, 28 September 2023	09:00	Round of 16
Thursday, 28 September 2023	09:00	Quarterfinals
Thursday, 28 September 2023	14:00	Semifinals
Thursday, 28 September 2023	14:00	Gold medal contest

== Results ==
Legend

- P — Won by punitive declaration

Round of 16
Lee Meng-en (TPE)	13	17
Ray Rahi (LBN)	13	4
Anas Sadek (JOR)	10	13
Jackie Yadav (NEP)	1	1
Samuel Morrison (PHI)	7	9
Arian Salimi (IRI)	19	15^{P}
Smaiyl Duisebay (KAZ)	5	9
Nima Wangdi (BHU)	0	2
Wadhah Al-Ahmed (QAT)	0	2
Hamzah Omar Saeed (PAK)	6	4
Ali Akbar Amiri (AFG)	4	9
Lee Seon-gi (KOR)	1	8
Ali Al-Mabrouk (KSA)	1	3
Song Zhaoxiang (CHN)	4	12

Quarterfinals
Nikita Rafalovich (UZB)	3	8	2
Lee Meng-en (TPE)	4	0	3
Anas Sadek (JOR)	9	4
Arian Salimi (IRI)	12	6^{P}
Smaiyl Duisebay (KAZ)	6	9
Hamzah Omar Saeed (PAK)	5	3
Ali Akbar Amiri (AFG)	5	2	2
Song Zhaoxiang (CHN)	4	3	7

Semifinals
Lee Meng-en (TPE)	10	13
Arian Salimi (IRI)	14	16
Smaiyl Duisebay (KAZ)	2	6
Song Zhaoxiang (CHN)	6	17

Gold medal contest
Arian Salimi (IRI)	11	19	15
Song Zhaoxiang (CHN)	17	13	21
