= Ícaro Miguel Soares =

Brazilian taekwondo practitioner

Personal information
- Full name: Ícaro Miguel Martins Soares
- Born: 29 April 1995 (age 31) Belo Horizonte, Brazil
- Home town: São Caetano do Sul, Brazil
- Height: 187 cm (6 ft 2 in)
- Weight: 80 kg (176 lb)

Sport
- Sport: Taekwondo
- University team: Universidade Municipal de São Caetano do Sul
Medal record
Representing Brazil
Men's taekwondo
World Championships
Silver medal – second place	2019 Manchester	87 kg
Pan American Games
Silver medal – second place	2019 Lima	80 kg
Pan American Championships
Gold medal – first place	2021 Cancún	87 kg
Gold medal – first place	2022 Punta Cana	87 kg
Silver medal – second place	2018 Spokane	87 kg
South American Games
Gold medal – first place	2022 Asunción	87 kg

Ícaro Miguel Martins Soares (born 29 April 1995) is a Brazilian taekwondo athlete who won a silver medal at the 2019 World Taekwondo Championships on the men's heavyweights.

He represented Brazil at the 2020 Summer Olympics.

== Career ==
Icaro suffered a domestic accident at the age of six, when he lost 90% of the vision in his right eye. Disability does not prevented him from developing as a fighter, to the point of becoming one of the top athletes in the world.

At the 2017 World Taekwondo Championships, Ícaro was eliminated on his debut by Chinese Jintao Liu. The Brazilian had an advantage in the first two rounds (13 to 9), but suffered a comeback in the last two and ended up defeated 19 to 17.

At the 2018 Pan American Taekwondo Championships held in Spokane, USA, he won the silver medal in the 87 kg category.

At the 2019 World Taekwondo Championships held in Manchester, United Kingdom, Ícaro achieved a historic result by reaching the final and obtaining the silver medal.

At the 2019 Pan American Games held in Lima, Peru, he reached the final, but was defeated by Miguel Angel Trejo (19–17) and took the silver medal in the under 80 kg category.

In April 2020, Ícaro became the leader of the world rankings in the under-87 kg category. Furthermore, he came to occupy fourth position in the Olympic category up to 80 kg. He was the first Brazilian taekwondist ever to top the world rankings.

At the 2021 Pan American Taekwondo Championships held in Cancún, Mexico, Ícaro won his first title in the -87 kg category.

Ícaro participated in the 2020 Olympic Games, being eliminated in the first round.

At the 2022 Pan American Taekwondo Championships held in Punta Cana, Dominican Republic, Ícaro won his second title in the tournament by obtaining the gold medal in the 87 kg category.

At the 2022 South American Games held in Asunción, Paraguay, he won the gold medal in the +80 kg category.

At the 2022 World Taekwondo Championships, Ícaro, despite having won silver in the previous World Championship in the under-87 kg category and being leader of the Olympic ranking in the heavyweight category, lost in his debut to Abolfazl Abbasi Pouya, from Iran.

Ícaro is the first Latin American to remain at the top of the world rankings for a long time: he spent three years as the best in the world until leaving this position in mid-2023.

At the 2023 World Taekwondo Championships, Ícaro won his first fight, but, in the round of 16, he faced a tough opponent: Kang Sang-hyun, from South Korea, the main power in taekwondo, and ended up being eliminated. The Korean ended up being the tournament champion.
