= Smaiyl Duisebay =

Kazakhstani taekwondo practitioner

Personal information
- Born: 28 May 1996 (age 30)

Sport
- Country: Kazakhstan
- Sport: Taekwondo
- Weight class: 87 kg
Medal record
Men's taekwondo
Representing Kazakhstan
Asian Games
Bronze medal – third place	2022 Hangzhou	+80 kg
Asian Taekwondo Championships
Gold medal – first place	2018 Ho Chi Minh City	–87 kg
Silver medal – second place	2016 Pasay	–87 kg
Silver medal – second place	2021 Beirut	–87 kg
Bronze medal – third place	2022 Chuncheon	–87 kg
Summer Universiade
Silver medal – second place	2019 Naples	–87 kg
Bronze medal – third place	2017 Taipei	Team Kyorugi

Smaiyl Duisebay (Смайыл Алтайұлы Дүйсебай, born 28 May 1996) is a Kazakhstani taekwondo practitioner. He won the silver medal in the –87 kg event at the 2019 Summer Universiade held in Naples, Italy. In the same year, he also competed in the men's middleweight event at the 2019 World Taekwondo Championships held in Manchester, United Kingdom.

In 2015, he competed in the men's middleweight event at the World Taekwondo Championships held in Chelyabinsk, Russia. He was eliminated in his second match. Two years later, he was also eliminated in his second match in the same event at the 2017 World Taekwondo Championships held in Muju County, South Korea.
