= Abolfazl Abbasi =

Iranian Taekwondo athlete (born 2005)

Personal information
- Born: 2 September 2005 (age 20) Mazandaran, Iran
- Weight: +78 kg

Sport
- Country: Iran
- Sport: Taekwondo
Medal record
Representing Iran
World Junior Championships
Gold medal – first place	2022 Sofia	78 kg

Abolfazl Abbasi (born 12 February 2005) is an Iranian Taekwondo athlete. He won a gold medal at the 2022 World Taekwondo Junior Championships in the Men's +78 kg weight class.

== Personal life ==
In April 2024, Abbasi immigrated to Germany.

On 19 January 2026, after fellow taekwondo practitioners Amir Mohammad Karami and Shayan Shekari were killed during the 2025–2026 Iranian protests, Abbasi posted pictures of them on his Instagram and saying: "Your path undoubtedly continues; your souls rest in peace, heroes of the homeland".
