= Taekwondo at the 2020 Summer Olympics – Men's +80 kg =

Taekwondo competition

Men's +80 kg at the Games of the XXXII Olympiad
- Venue: Makuhari Messe
- Date: 27 July 2021

Medalists
| 1st place, gold medalist(s) | | Vladislav Larin | ROC |
| 2nd place, silver medalist(s) | | Dejan Georgievski | North Macedonia |
| 3rd place, bronze medalist(s) | | In Kyo-don | South Korea |
| 3rd place, bronze medalist(s) | | Rafael Alba | Cuba |

The men's +80 kg competition in Taekwondo at the 2020 Summer Olympics was held on 27 July 2021, at the Makuhari Messe Hall A.

== Results ==
=== Main bracket ===
Round of 16
13 Ivan Šapina (CRO) | 6
4 Carlos Sansores (MEX) | 4
5 Mahama Cho (GBR) | 4
12 Sun Hongyi (CHN) | 7
9 Anthony Obame (GAB) | 5
8 Ivan Trajkovič (SLO) | 26
1 Vladislav Larin (ROC) | 24
16 Pita Taufatofua (TGA) | 3
15 Farzad Mansouri (AFG) | 12
2 In Kyo-don (KOR) | 13
7 Alexander Bachmann (GER) | 7
10 Ruslan Zhaparov (KAZ) | 11
11 Seydou Gbané (CIV) | 15
6 Abdoul Razak Issoufou (NIG) | 9
3 Rafael Alba (CUB) | 8
14 Dejan Georgievski (MKD) | 11

Quarter-finals
13 Ivan Šapina (CRO) | 6
12 Sun Hongyi (CHN) | 8
8 Ivan Trajkovič (SLO) | 3
1 Vladislav Larin (ROC) | 16
2 In Kyo-don (KOR) | 10
10 Ruslan Zhaparov (KAZ) | 2
11 Seydou Gbané (CIV) | 4
14 Dejan Georgievski (MKD) | 9

Semi-finals
12 Sun Hongyi (CHN) | 3
1 Vladislav Larin (ROC) | 30
2 In Kyo-don (KOR) | 6
14 Dejan Georgievski (MKD) | 12

Gold medal
1 Vladislav Larin (ROC) | 15
14 Dejan Georgievski (MKD) | 9

=== Repechage ===
| Repechage | | | Bronze Medal |
| | | | 2 | In Kyo-don (KOR) | 5 |
| | | | 8 | Ivan Trajkovič (SLO) | 4 |
| 16 | Pita Taufatofua (TGA) | 1 | 8 | Ivan Trajkovič (SLO) | 4 |
| 8 | Ivan Trajkovič (SLO) | 22 |

| Repechage | | | Bronze Medal |
| | | | 12 | Sun Hongyi (CHN) | 4 |
| | | | 3 | Rafael Alba (CUB) | 5 |
| 3 | Rafael Alba (CUB) | 8 | 3 | Rafael Alba (CUB) | 5 |
| 11 | Seydou Gbané (CIV) | 2 |
