= Dejan Georgievski =

Macedonian taekwondo practitioner

Personal information
- Native name: Дејан Георгиевски
- Nationality: Macedonian
- Born: 8 May 1999 (age 27) Skopje, Macedonia

Sport
- Country: North Macedonia
- Sport: Taekwondo
- Event: Heavyweight (+87 kg)
Medal record
Representing North Macedonia
Men's taekwondo
Olympic Games
Silver medal – second place	2020 Tokyo	+80 kg
Grand Prix
Bronze medal – third place	2022 Rome	+80 kg
Bronze medal – third place	2022 Riyadh (F)	+80 kg
European Games
Silver medal – second place	2023 Kraków-Małopolska	+87 kg
Mediterranean Games
Silver medal – second place	2018 Tarragona	+80 kg
Bronze medal – third place	2022 Oran	+80 kg
European U21 Championships
Bronze medal – third place	2017 Sofia	+87 kg
Bronze medal – third place	2018 Warsaw	+87 kg

Dejan Georgievski (Macedonian: Дејан Георгиевски; born 8 May 1999) is a Macedonian professional taekwondo practitioner who represents North Macedonia internationally in the World Taekwondo Tournaments in the men's heavyweight (+87 kg) class. He is an Olympic silver medalist in the men's +80 kg event at the 2020 Summer Olympics in Tokyo.

== Career ==
In 2018 Georgievski won the silver medal in the men's +80 kg taekwondo competition at the XVIIIth Mediterranean Games.

Besides the Mediterranean Games, he won numerous medals in international competitions including the European Olympic Qualification Tournament, the President's Cup, the Sofia Open, the Turkish Open, the Greece Open, Galeb Belgrade Trophy (Serbia Open), the Slovenia Open and more.

Georgievski is currently ranked 25th in the World Taekwondo heavyweight (+87 kg) rankings and 39th in the +80 kg Olympic weight class.

=== 2020 Summer Olympics ===
Georgievski qualified for the 2020 Summer Olympics in the men's +80 kg by beating 2016 Olympic champion Radik Isayev of Azerbaijan 13-6 at the European Olympic Qualification Tournament in Sofia. At the Olympics in Tokyo, Georgievski won reigning world champion Rafael Alba of Cuba 11-8 in the round of 16 and captured the silver medal by beating two-time Asian champion In Kyo-don of South Korea 12-6 in the semifinals.

He won one of the bronze medals in the men's +80 kg event at the 2022 Mediterranean Games held in Oran, Algeria.

== Tournament record ==
Competition Results
Year	Event	Location	G-Rank	Place
2021	Olympic Games	(Japan) Tokyo	G-20	2nd place, silver medalist(s)
2021	European Championships	(Bulgaria) Sofia	G-4	9th
2020	Sofia Open	(Bulgaria) Sofia	G-1	1st place, gold medalist(s)
2020	Slovenia Open	(Slovenia) Ljubljana	G-1	1st place, gold medalist(s)
2019	WTE Multi European Games	(Bulgaria) Sofia	G-1	1st place, gold medalist(s)
2019	European Clubs Championships	(Greece) Thessaloniki	G-1	2nd place, silver medalist(s)
2019	Turkish Open	(Turkey) Antalya	G-1	1st place, gold medalist(s)
2018	Serbia Open	(Serbia) Belgrade	G-1	2nd place, silver medalist(s)
2018	Greece Open	(Greece) Athens	G-1	1st place, gold medalist(s)
2018	Mediterranean Games	(Spain) Tarragona	G-1	2nd place, silver medalist(s)
2018	WTE Multi European Games	(Bulgaria) Plovdiv	G-1	1st place, gold medalist(s)
2018	Sofia Open	(Bulgaria) Sofia	G-1	1st place, gold medalist(s)
2018	Turkish Open	(Turkey) Istanbul	G-1	3rd place, bronze medalist(s)
2017	European Olympic Weight Category Championships	(Bulgaria) Sofia	G-1	1st place, gold medalist(s)
2017	Sofia Open	(Bulgaria) Sofia	G-1	1st place, gold medalist(s)
