= Vladislav Larin =

Russian taekwondo practitioner

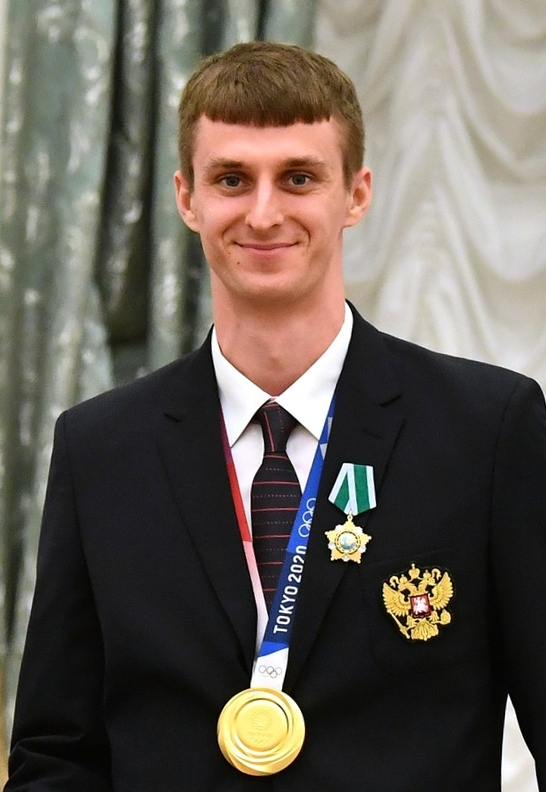
- Larin in 2021

Personal information
- Nationality: (Russia) Russian
- Born: Vladislav Vladimirovich Larin; October 7, 1995 (age 30) Kotkozero, Olonetsky District, Republic of Karelia, Russia

Sport
- Country: Russia
- Sport: Taekwondo
- Event: Heavyweight (+87 kg)
- Club: Central Sports Army Club
- Coached by: Richard Shapovalov; Denis Kim; Sergey Petrov; Stanislav Khan
Medal record
Representing (Russia) ROC
Olympic Games
| Gold medal – first place | 2020 Tokyo | +80 kg |
Representing Russia
World Championships
| Gold medal – first place | 2019 Manchester | -87 kg |
| Silver medal – second place | 2017 Muju | -87 kg |
| Bronze medal – third place | 2015 Chelyabinsk | -87 kg |
Grand Prix
| Gold medal – first place | 2017 Abidjan | +80 kg |
| Gold medal – first place | 2018 Rome | +80 kg |
| Gold medal – first place | 2018 Taoyuan | +80 kg |
| Gold medal – first place | 2018 Manchester | +80 kg |
| Gold medal – first place | 2018 Fujairah | +80 kg |
| Gold medal – first place | 2019 Rome | +80 kg |
| Gold medal – first place | 2023 Taiyuan | +80 kg |
| Silver medal – second place | 2015 Moscow | +80 kg |
| Silver medal – second place | 2019 Chiba | +80 kg |
European Championships
| Gold medal – first place | 2016 Montreux | -87 kg |
| Gold medal – first place | 2018 Kazan | -87 kg |
| Silver medal – second place | 2021 Sofia | +87 kg |
European Games
| Silver medal – second place | 2015 Baku | +80 kg |
Military World Games
| Silver medal – second place | 2019 Wuhan | +87 kg |

Vladislav Vladimirovich Larin (Russian: Владислав Владимирович Ларин, IPA: [vlədʲɪˈslaf vlɐˈdʲimʲɪrəvʲɪtɕ ˈlarʲɪn]; born 7 October 1995) is a Russian taekwondo fighter, Olympic, World and European Champion, and fivefold Grand Prix series winner.

Larin initially qualified for the 2024 Summer Olympics as an Individual Neutral Athlete (AIN), but the International Olympic Committee did not declare him neutral and he was not invited to the Games as a result.

== Early life ==
Vladislav Larin was born 7 October 1995 in the village of Kotkozero, Karelia. When he was five, his family moved to Petrozavodsk, the capital of Karelia. He practiced artistic gymnastics before receiving a longtime hand injury at the age of 5, urging him to discontinue. In 2002, he switched to taekwondo, attending and graduating from the Institute for Physical Culture, Sports and Tourism of the Petrozavodsk State University, where he practiced taekwondo.

== Personal life ==
On 16 August 2020, Larin married ninefold Russian poomse taekwondo champion Anastasia. Their wedding took place in Karelia.

== Political stance ==
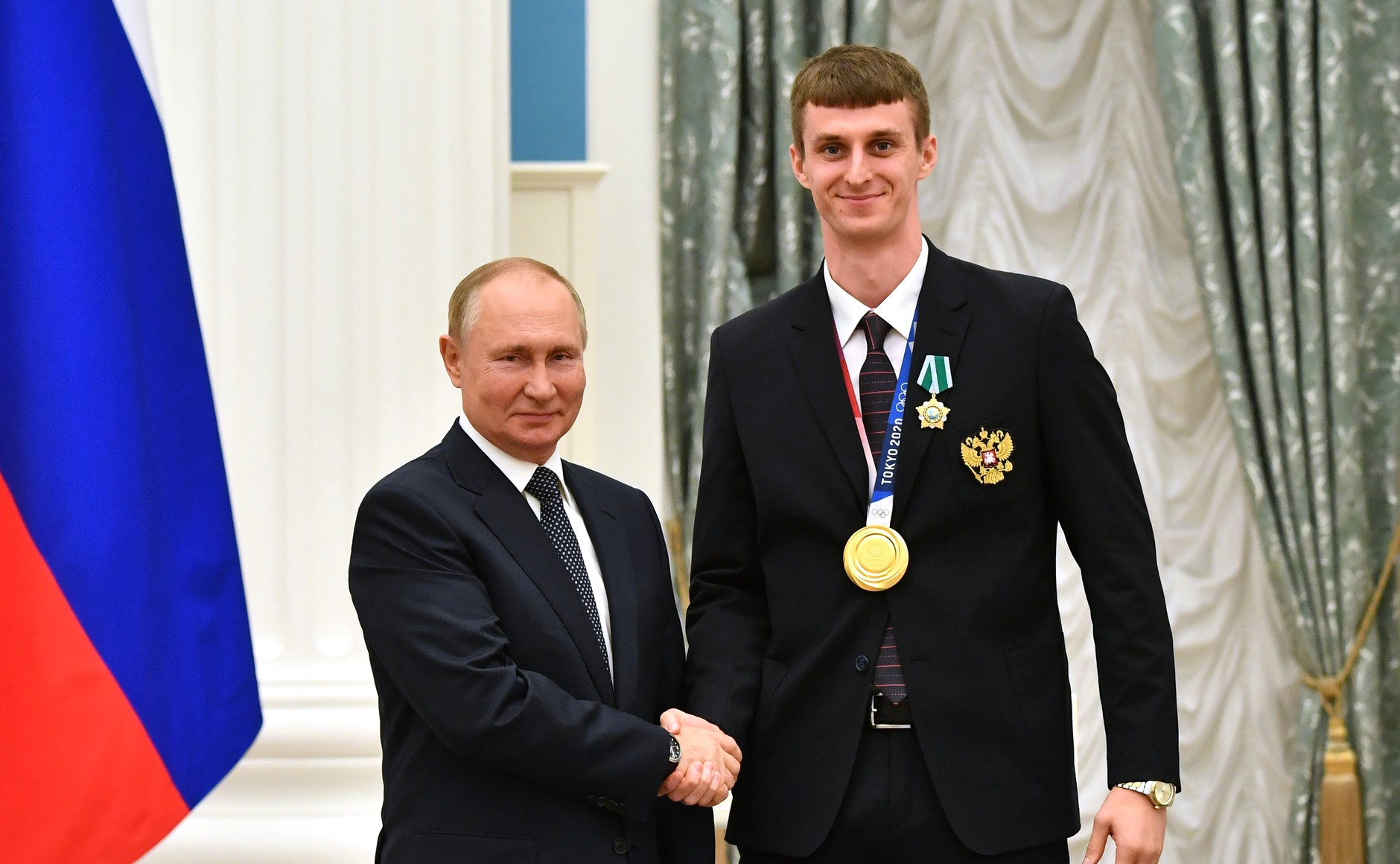
Larin and Vladimir Putin in 2021

Larin was among the two Russian athletes barred from entering the 2023 World Taekwondo Championships due to his explicit support for the Russian invasion of Ukraine. Larin shot a video in which he called on people to donate for the mobilized Russian soldiers. In October 2023, the Security Service of Ukraine was considering opening a case against Larin whom they accused of financing terrorism and encroachment on the territorial integrity and inviolability of Ukraine. On October 18, Larin was added to the Myrotvorets list.
