= Alexander Bachmann =

German taekwondo practitioner

Personal information
- Nationality: German
- Born: July 19, 1994 (age 31)

Sport
- Country: Germany
- Sport: Taekwondo
- Event: 87 kg
- Coached by: Aziz Acharki
Medal record
Representing Germany
Men's taekwondo
World Championships
Gold medal – first place	2017 Muju	87 kg
Military World Games
Silver medal – second place	2015 Mungyeong	87 kg
European Under 21 Championships
Bronze medal – third place	2015 Chișinău	87 kg
Silver medal – second place	2014 Innsbruck	+87 kg

Alexander Bachmann (born 17 July 1994) is a German taekwondo athlete. He won the gold medal at the 2017 World Taekwondo Championships on the Men's middleweight category.
