= Jordan Stewart (taekwondo) =

Canadian taekwondo practitioner

Personal information
- Full name: Jordan Isaiah Drake Stewart
- Born: 28 December 1996 (age 29) Vaughan, Ontario, Canada
- Height: 189 cm (6 ft 2 in)

Sport
- Sport: Taekwondo
Medal record
Men's taekwondo
Representing Canada
Pan American Championships
Bronze medal – third place	2018 Spokane	-87 kg
Bronze medal – third place	2016 Queretaro	-87 kg
Bronze medal – third place	2013 Queretaro	-87 kg
World Military Games
Bronze medal – third place	2019 Wuhan	-87 kg

Jordan Isaiah Drake Stewart (born 28 December 1996) is a Canadian taekwondo practitioner.

== Sport Career ==
In 2019, Stewart qualified and was named to Canada's 2019 Pan American Games team in Lima, Peru.

== Military Service ==
Stewart Serves in the Canadian army reserves and was named Male athlete of the year in 2024 for the Canadian army and Canadian Armed Forces
