= In Kyo-don =

South Korean taekwondo practitioner

In "The Bear" Kyo-don
Personal information
- Nickname: The Bear
- Nationality: South Korean
- Born: June 27, 1992 (age 34) Incheon, South Korea
- Height: 1.90 m (6 ft 3 in)

Sport
- Sport: Taekwondo
- Event: Heavyweight
- University team: Yongin University
Medal record
Representing South Korea
Olympic Games
Bronze medal – third place	2020 Tokyo	+80 kg
World Championships
Bronze medal – third place	2017 Muju	87 kg
Grand Slam
Gold medal – first place	2017 Wuxi	+80 kg
Grand Prix
Gold medal – first place	2017 London	+80 kg
Gold medal – first place	2018 Moscow	+80 kg
Silver medal – second place	2017 Moscow	+80 kg
Silver medal – second place	2017 Abidjan	+80 kg
Silver medal – second place	2018 Rome	+80 kg
Bronze medal – third place	2017 Rabat	+80 kg
Asian Championships
Gold medal – first place	2018 Ho Chi Minh City	+87 kg
Gold medal – first place	2016 Manila	87 kg
Universiade
Silver medal – second place	2015 Gwangju	87 kg

In Kyo-don (Korean: 인교돈; RR: In Gyodon) also known as "The Bear" (born June 27, 1992) is a South Korean taekwondo practitioner. He won the gold medal at the 2017 World Taekwondo Grand Slam on the heavyweight category.

== Biography ==
He began to be interested in taekwondo after seeing a taekwondo kick demonstration in a local dojo during first year of elementary school. He was diagnosed with stage 2 lymphoma in 2014, which was completely cured in 2019.
