= Iran at the 2024 Summer Olympics =

- IOC code: IRI
- NOC: National Olympic Committee of the Islamic Republic of Iran
- Website: www.olympic.ir (in Persian and English)

in Paris, France 26 July 2024 – 11 August 2024
- Competitors: 41 (30 men and 11 women) in 14 sports
- Flag bearers (opening): Mahdi Olfati & Neda Shahsavari
- Flag bearer (closing): Fatemeh Mojallal
- Medals Ranked 21st: Gold 3 Silver 6 Bronze 3 Total 12

Summer Olympics appearances (overview)
- 1900; 1904–1936; 1948; 1952; 1956; 1960; 1964; 1968; 1972; 1976; 1980–1984; 1988; 1992; 1996; 2000; 2004; 2008; 2012; 2016; 2020; 2024; 2028

Iran (officially called the Islamic Republic of Iran) competed at the 2024 Summer Olympics in Paris from 26 July to 11 August 2024. Since the nation's return in 1948 after having made their debut in 1900, Iranian athletes have appeared in every edition of the Summer Olympic Games except for Moscow 1980 and Los Angeles 1984, citing political reasons. This was the nation's 19th appearance at the Summer Olympics.

During the Games, 41 competitors across 14 sports competed for Iran at the 2024 Summer Olympics. The Iranian roster featured a number of past Olympians and Olympic medalists, including taekwondo fighter Nahid Kiani, who became the first Iranian woman to win a silver medal at the Olympics and thereby surpassing Kimia Alizadeh's 2016 bronze feat, and freestyle wrestler Hassan Yazdani, who won his third Olympic medal with a silver medal. A total of 12 medals were won for Iran at these Games, 3 of which were gold, placing Iran at 21st on the medal table for these Games.

On the Refugee Olympic Team at the 2024 Summer Olympics, 14 of the 37 athletes were Iranian. Elsewhere, some Iranians, such as Kimia Alizadeh, competed for other nations (see Other Iranians).

== Calls for ban on participation ==
There had been calls to ban Iran from the 2024 Summer Olympics due to human rights abuse allegations following the executions of Iranian wrestler Navid Afkari and national karate champion Mohammad Mehdi Karami, crackdown on protesters and athletes during the Mahsa Amini protests, blinding of archer Kowsar Khoshnoudi-Kia, and defection of taekwondo medalist Kimia Alizadeh. A group of Iranian dissidents including Franco-Iranian boxer Mahyar Monshipour and Nobel Peace Prize winner Shirin Ebadi sent a letter to the IOC calling for Iran to be banned; they opined that the country's prohibition of women from practicing sports like wrestling, boxing, swimming, and sailing was not in line with the Olympic Charter. American senator Marsha Blackburn petitioned IOC President Thomas Bach to ban Iran from the Paris Games. The IOC expressed serious concerns over the situation of the Iranian athletes and urged the Iranian Olympic Committee to take appropriate action with the highest authorities to protect the athletes and members of the Olympic community from a humanitarian perspective. The IOC said that it reserves the right to take any appropriate action relating to the participation of the Iranian NOC and athletes in regards to the 2024 Summer Olympics.

== Medalists ==
Medal	Name	Sport	Event	Date
Gold	Mohammad Hadi Saravi	Wrestling	Men's Greco-Roman 97 kg	7 August
Gold	Saeid Esmaeili	Wrestling	Men's Greco-Roman 67 kg	8 August
Gold	Arian Salimi	Taekwondo	Men's +80 kg	10 August
Silver	Alireza Mohmadi	Wrestling	Men's Greco-Roman 87 kg	8 August
Silver	Nahid Kiani	Taekwondo	Women's 57 kg	8 August
Silver	Hassan Yazdani	Wrestling	Men's freestyle 86 kg	9 August
Silver	Mehran Barkhordari	Taekwondo	Men's 80 kg	9 August
Silver	Amir Hossein Zare	Wrestling	Men's freestyle 125 kg	10 August
Silver	Rahman Amouzad	Wrestling	Men's freestyle 65 kg	11 August
Bronze	Amin Mirzazadeh	Wrestling	Men's Greco-Roman 130 kg	6 August
Bronze	Mobina Nematzadeh	Taekwondo	Women's 49 kg	7 August
Bronze	Amir Ali Azarpira	Wrestling	Men's freestyle 97 kg	11 August

Medals by sport
Sport	1st place, gold medalist(s)	2nd place, silver medalist(s)	3rd place, bronze medalist(s)	Total
Wrestling	2	4	2	8
Taekwondo	1	2	1	4

Medals by date
Day	Date	1st place, gold medalist(s)	2nd place, silver medalist(s)	3rd place, bronze medalist(s)	Total
11	6 August	0	0	1	1
12	7 August	1	0	1	2
13	8 August	1	2	0	3
14	9 August	0	2	0	2
15	10 August	1	1	0	2
16	11 August	0	1	1	2
Total		3	6	3	12

Medals by gender
Gender	1st place, gold medalist(s)	2nd place, silver medalist(s)	3rd place, bronze medalist(s)	Total
Male	3	5	2	10
Female	0	1	1	2
Mixed	0	0	0	0
Total	3	6	3	12

== Competitors ==
The following is the list of the number of competitors in the Games.

Sport	Men	Women	Total
Archery	0	1	1
Athletics	1	1	2
Canoeing	2	0	2
Cycling	1	0	1
Fencing	4	0	4
Gymnastics	1	0	1
Rowing	0	3	3
Shooting	1	3	4
Sport climbing	1	0	1
Swimming	1	0	1
Table tennis	2	1	3
Taekwondo	2	2	4
Weightlifting	2	0	2
Wrestling	12	0	12
Total	30	11	41

== Archery ==
One Iranian archer qualified for the women's individual recurve through the 2024 Final Individual Qualification Tournament in Antalya, Turkey.

Athlete	Event	Ranking round		Round of 64	Round of 32	Round of 16	Quarterfinals	Semifinals	Final / BM	
Athlete	Event	Score	Seed	Opposition Score	Opposition Score	Opposition Score	Opposition Score	Opposition Score	Opposition Score	Rank
Mobina Fallah	Women's individual	652	28	Ánh Nguyệt (VIE); W 6^{X}–5^{10}	E Gökkır (TUR); L 0–6	Did not advance				17

== Athletics ==
Iran sent two runners to compete at the 2024 Summer Olympics.

Track & road events

Athlete	Event	Heat		Semifinal		Final	
Athlete	Event	Result	Rank	Result	Rank	Result	Rank
Hassan Taftian	Men's 100 m	10.18 SB	5	Did not advance			33
Farzaneh Fasihi	Women's 100 m	11.51	7	Did not advance			51

== Canoeing ==
=== Sprint ===
Iranian canoeists qualified one boat for the Games through the result of the highest ranked eligible nations in the following events, through the 2024 Asian Sprint Canoeing Championships in Tokyo, Japan.

Athlete	Event	Heats		Quarterfinals		Semifinals		Final	
Athlete	Event	Time	Rank	Time	Rank	Time	Rank	Time	Rank
Ali Aghamirzaei	Men's K-1 1000 m	3:36.58	6 QF	3:33.78	3	Did not advance			18
Mohammad Nabi Rezaei	Men's C-1 1000 m	4:10.36	4 QF	3:52.41	4	Did not advance			18

Qualification Legend: FA = Qualify to final (medal); FB = Qualify to final B (non-medal); SF = Qualified for Semifinals; QF = Qualified for Quarterfinals;

== Cycling ==
=== Road ===
Iran entered one male rider to compete in the road race events at the Olympics. The nation's secured those quota through the 2023 Asian Championships in Rayong, Thailand.

Athlete	Event	Time	Diff.	Rank
Ali Labib	Men's road race	6:46:33	+26:59	76

== Fencing ==
Iran entered four fencers into the Olympic competition. The nation's men's sabre team secured quota places in men's sabre events, after being nominated as one of the highest-ranked nations from Asia & Oceania, through the release of the FIE Official ranking for Paris 2024.

Athlete	Event	Round of 64	Round of 32	Round of 16	Quarterfinal	Semifinal	Final / BM	
Athlete	Event	Opposition Score	Opposition Score	Opposition Score	Opposition Score	Opposition Score	Opposition Score	Rank
Ali Pakdaman	Men's sabre	Bye	Yoshida (JPN); W 15–11	Sang-uk (KOR); L 10–15	Did not advance			13
Mohammad Rahbari	Men's sabre	Bye	Patrice (FRA); L 13–15	Did not advance				28
Mohammad Fotouhi	Men's sabre	Zea (MEX); L 13–15	Did not advance					33
Ali Pakdaman; Mohammad Rahbari; Mohammad Fotouhi; Farzad Baher Arasbaran*	Men's team sabre	—N/a			United States; W 45–44	Hungary; L 43–45	France; L 25–45	4

== Gymnastics ==
=== Artistic ===
Iran entered one gymnast into the games. Mahdi Olfati directly secured his quota to compete at the Olympics by being one of the highest-ranked eligible athlete in the men's vault, through the final accumulations of the 2024 Apparatus World Cup Series rankings and marking the nation's return to the sport since Tokyo 1964.

Men

Athlete	Event	Qualification								Final							
Athlete	Event	Apparatus						Total	Rank	Apparatus						Total	Rank
Athlete	Event	F	PH	R	V	PB	HB	Total	Rank	F	PH	R	V	PB	HB	Total	Rank
Mahdi Olfati	Men's Vault	—N/a			14.583	—N/a			8 Q	—N/a			14.266	—N/a			7

== Rowing ==
Iranian rowers qualified two boats for the following events, through the 2024 Asia & Oceania Qualification Regatta in Chungju, South Korea.

Athlete	Event	Heats		Repechage		Quarterfinals		Semifinals		Final	
Athlete	Event	Time	Rank	Time	Rank	Time	Rank	Time	Rank	Time	Rank
Fatemeh Mojallal	Women's single sculls	8:01.30	4 R	7:56.48	1 QF	8:00.37	6 SC/D	8:06.23	6 FD	7:46.08	21
Mahsa Javar; Zeinab Norouzi	Women's lightweight double sculls	7:35.97	4 R	7:35.56	4 FC	—N/a		Did not advance		7:14.32	16

Qualification Legend: FA=Final A (medal); FB=Final B (non-medal); FC=Final C (non-medal); FD=Final D (non-medal); FE=Final E (non-medal); FF=Final F (non-medal); SA/B=Semifinals A/B; SC/D=Semifinals C/D; SE/F=Semifinals E/F; QF=Quarterfinals; R=Repechage

== Shooting ==
Iranian shooters achieved quota places for the following events based on their results at the 2022 and 2023 ISSF World Championships, 2023 and 2024 Asian Championships, and 2024 ISSF World Olympic Qualification Tournament.

Athlete	Event	Qualification		Final	
Athlete	Event	Points	Rank	Points	Rank
Mohammad Beiranvand	Men's trap	117	24	Did not advance	
Shermineh Chehel Amirani	Women's 10 m air rifle	630.0	11	Did not advance	
Fatemeh Amini	Women's 10 m air rifle	626.2	26	Did not advance	
Hanieh Rostamian	Women's 10 m air pistol	571	22	Did not advance	
Hanieh Rostamian	Women's 25 m pistol	588	3 Q	19	6

== Sport climbing ==
Iran qualified one climber for Paris 2024. Reza Alipour qualified directly for the men's speed events, through the 2024 Olympic Qualifier series ranking; marking the nation's debut in these sports.

Speed

Athlete	Event	Qualification		Round of 16	Quarterfinals	Semifinals	Final / BM	
Athlete	Event	Time	Rank	Opposition Time	Opposition Time	Opposition Time	Opposition Time	Rank
Reza Alipour	Men's	5.06	6	David (NZL); L 5.26 q –5.20	Maimuratov (KAZ); W 5.57–6.14	Leonardo (INA); L 4.84 PB –4.78	Watson (USA); L 4.88–4.74	4

== Swimming ==
Iran received a‌n Universality invitation from FINA to send a male swimmer to the 2024 Summer Olympics.

Athlete	Event	Heat		Semifinal		Final	
Athlete	Event	Time	Rank	Time	Rank	Time	Rank
Samyar Abdoli	Men's 100 m freestyle	50.63	48	Did not advance			

== Table tennis ==
Iran entered three table tennis players into Paris 2024. Nima Alamian and Neda Shahsavari qualified for the games, following the triumph of winning the gold medals, respectively in men's and women's singles event, at the 2024 Central Asian Qualification Tournament in Tashkent, Uzbekistan; meanwhile Noshad Alamian qualified for the games through the final world ranking.

Athlete	Event	Round 1	Round 2	Round 3	Round of 16	Quarterfinals	Semifinals	Final / BM	
Athlete	Event	Opposition Result	Opposition Result	Opposition Result	Opposition Result	Opposition Result	Opposition Result	Opposition Result	Rank
Noshad Alamian	Men's singles	Omatoyo (NGR); W 4–1	Harimoto (JPN); L 2–4	Did not advance					17
Nima Alamian	Men's singles	Kao C (TPE); L 1–4	Did not advance						33
Neda Shahsavari	Women's singles	Pavade (FRA); L 1–4	Did not advance						33

== Taekwondo ==
Iran qualified four athletes to compete at the games. Nahid Kiani qualified for Paris 2024 by virtue of finishing within the top five in the Olympic rankings in her respective division, meanwhile Mehran Barkhordari qualified the games by virtue of finishing first at the Grand Slam Series rankings. Later on Mobina Nematzadeh and Arian Salimi secured a quota places in their respective division, by virtue of their victory in the semifinal round, at the 2024 Asian Olympic Qualification Tournament in Tai'an, China.

Athlete	Event	Round of 16	Quarterfinals	Semifinals	Repechage	Final / BM	
Athlete	Event	Opposition Result	Opposition Result	Opposition Result	Opposition Result	Opposition Result	Rank
Mehran Barkhordari	Men's −80 kg	Jaysunov (UZB); W 2–1	Alessio (ITA); W 2–1	Seo (KOR); W 2–1	Bye	Katoussi (TUN); L 0–2	2nd place, silver medalist(s)
Arian Salimi	Men's +80 kg	Rafalovich (UZB); W 2–0	Sansores (MEX); W 2–1	Šapina (CRO); W 2–1	Bye	Cunningham (GBR); W 2–1	1st place, gold medalist(s)
Mobina Nematzadeh	Women's –49 kg	Tau (LES); W 2–0	Cerezo (ESP); W 2–0	Guo (CHN); L 0–2	Bye	Abu Taleb (KSA); W 2–0	3rd place, bronze medalist(s)
Nahid Kiani	Women's –57 kg	Alizadeh (BUL); W 2–1	Toumi (TUN); W 2–1	Aoun (LBN); W 2–0	Bye	Kim (KOR); L 0–2	2nd place, silver medalist(s)

== Weightlifting ==
Iran entered two weightlifters into the Olympic competition. Mirmostafa Javadi (men's 89 kg) and Ali Davoudi (men's +102 kg) secured one of the top ten slots, in their respective weight division based on the IWF Olympic Qualification Rankings.

Athlete	Event	Snatch		Clean & Jerk		Total	Rank
Athlete	Event	Result	Rank	Result	Rank	Total	Rank
Mirmostafa Javadi	Men's −89 kg	168	6	204	5	372	5
Ali Davoudi	Men's +102 kg	205	4	242	4	447	4

== Wrestling ==
Iran qualified twelve wrestlers for the following classes into the Olympic competition. Seven of them qualified by virtue of top five results through the 2023 World Championships in Belgrade, Serbia; meanwhile four of them qualified after winning the semifinal round at the 2024 Asian Olympic Qualification Tournament in Bishkek, Kyrgyzstan.

Key:

- VT (ranking points: 5–0 or 0–5) – Victory by fall.
- VB (ranking points: 5–0 or 0–5) – Victory by injury (VF for forfeit, VA for withdrawal or disqualification)
- PP (ranking points: 3–1 or 1–3) – Decision by points – the loser with technical points.
- PO (ranking points: 3–0 or 0–3) – Decision by points – the loser without technical points.
- ST (ranking points: 4–0 or 0–4) – Great superiority – the loser without technical points and a margin of victory of at least 8 (Greco-Roman) or 10 (freestyle) points.
- SP (ranking points: 4–1 or 1–4) – Technical superiority – the loser with technical points and a margin of victory of at least 8 (Greco-Roman) or 10 (freestyle) points.

Freestyle

Athlete	Event	Qualification	Round of 16	Quarterfinal	Semifinal	Repechage	Final / BM	
Athlete	Event	Opposition Result	Opposition Result	Opposition Result	Opposition Result	Opposition Result	Opposition Result	Rank
Alireza Sarlak	Men's 57 kg	—N/a	Higuchi (JPN); L 0–5^{VF}	Did not advance		Cruz (PUR); L 0–5^{VA}	Did not advance	LFO
Rahman Amouzad	Men's −65 kg	—N/a	Retherford (USA); W 3–0^{PO}	Dudaev (ALB); W 4–0ST	Musukaev (HUN); W 4–0ST	Bye	Kiyooka (JPN); L 1–3^{PP}	2nd place, silver medalist(s)
Younes Emami	Men's –74 kg	Chamizo (ITA); W 3–1^{PP}	Ndum (GBS); W 4–0ST	Dake (USA); L 0–5^{VT}	Did not advance			7
Hassan Yazdani	Men's −86 kg	—N/a	Lawrence (AUS); W 4–0ST	Kurugliev (GRE); W 3–1^{PP}	Amine (SMR); W 3–1^{PP}	Bye	Ramazanov (BUL); L 1–3^{PP}	2nd place, silver medalist(s)
Amir Ali Azarpira	Men's −97 kg	—N/a	Tazhudinov (BRN); L 1–3^{PP}	Did not advance		Yergali (KAZ); W 3–1^{PP}	Snyder (USA); W 3–1^{PP}	3rd place, bronze medalist(s)
Amir Hossein Zare	Men's −125 kg	—N/a	Lazarev (KGZ); W 3–0^{PO}	Dhesi (CAN); W 4–0ST	Akgül (TUR); W 3–1^{PP}	Bye	Petriashvili (GEO); L 1–3^{PP}	2nd place, silver medalist(s)

Greco-Roman

Athlete	Event	Round of 16	Quarterfinal	Semifinal	Repechage	Final / BM	
Athlete	Event	Opposition Result	Opposition Result	Opposition Result	Opposition Result	Opposition Result	Rank
Mehdi Mohsennejad	Men's −60 kg	Fergat (ALG); W 4–0ST	Fumita (JPN); L 0–4ST	Did not advance	de Armas (CUB); W 4–1^{SP}	Sharshenbekov (KGZ); L 1–3^{PP}	5
Saeid Esmaeili	Men's −67 kg	Ghaiou (ALG); W 4–0ST	Orta (CUB); W 4–0ST	Galstyan (ARM); W 3–1^{PP}	Bye	Nasibov (UKR); W 3–1^{PP}	1st place, gold medalist(s)
Amin Kavianinejad	Men's −77 kg	Peña (CUB); W 3–1^{PP}	Amoyan (ARM); L 0–3^{PO}	Did not advance			8
Alireza Mohmadi	Men's −87 kg	Muñoz (COL); W 4–0ST	Kułynycz (POL); W 4–1^{SP}	Beleniuk (UKR); W 3–1^{PP}	Bye	Novikov (BUL); L 0–3^{PO}	2nd place, silver medalist(s)
Mohammad Hadi Saravi	Men's −97 kg	Rau (USA); W 4–1^{SP}	Dzhuzupbekov (KGZ); W 4–0ST	Gabr (EGY); W 3–0^{PO}	Bye	Aleksanyan (ARM); W 3–1^{PP}	1st place, gold medalist(s)
Amin Mirzazadeh	Men's −130 kg	Coon (USA); W 3–1^{PP}	López (CUB); L 1–3^{PP}	Did not advance	Lee (KOR); W 4–0ST	Shariati (AZE); W 3–0^{PO}	3rd place, bronze medalist(s)

== Other Iranians ==
14 of the 37 athletes on the Refugee Olympic Team at the 2024 Summer Olympics were Iranian.

Likewise, some Iranians competed for other NOCs; some were born in Iran and had represented Iran in the past, while some were of Iranian descent. Notably, Kimia Alizadeh faced Nahid Kiani, with the former eventually winning bronze and the latter eventually winning silver.

Place	Name	NOC
Bronze	Tara Babulfath	Sweden
Bronze	Kimia Alizadeh	Bulgaria
Bronze	Sara Doorsoun-Khajeh	Germany
5th	Milad Karimi	Kazakhstan
5th	Sabah Shariati	Azerbaijan
9th	Tina Rahimi	Australia
28th	Dara Alizadeh	Bermuda
33rd	Hady Habib	Lebanon
35th	Mariam Sheikhalizadeh	Azerbaijan
	Dorsa Yavarivafa	Refugee Olympic Team
	Omid Ahmadisafa	Refugee Olympic Team
36th	Amir Rezanejad	Refugee Olympic Team
23rd	Saeid Fazloula	Refugee Olympic Team
38th	Saman Soltani	Refugee Olympic Team
17th	Mohammad Rashnonezhad	Refugee Olympic Team
17th	Mahboubeh Barbari Zharfi	Refugee Olympic Team
	Matin Balsini	Refugee Olympic Team
	Hadi Tiran	Refugee Olympic Team
	Kasra Mehdipournejad	Refugee Olympic Team
	Dina Pouryounes	Refugee Olympic Team
9th	Yekta Jamali	Refugee Olympic Team
	Iman Mahdavi	Refugee Olympic Team
17th	Jamal Valizadeh	Refugee Olympic Team

== See also ==
- Iran at the 2024 Summer Paralympics
- Iran at the 2024 Winter Youth Olympics
