= Refugee Olympic Team at the 2024 Summer Olympics =

Refugee team in the summer Olympics

- Individuals compete under the Olympic Flag
- IOC code: EOR
- NOC: Équipe olympique des réfugiés

in Paris, France 26 July 2024 – 11 August 2024
- Competitors: 37 (24 men and 13 women) in 12 sports
- Flag bearers (opening): Yahya Al Ghotany & Cindy Ngamba
- Flag bearers (closing): Farida Abaroge & Kasra Mehdipournejad
- Officials: Masomah Ali Zada, chef de mission
- Medals Ranked 84th: Gold 0 Silver 0 Bronze 1 Total 1

Summer Olympics appearances (overview)
- 2016; 2020; 2024; 2028

The IOC Refugee Olympic Team (French: Équipe olympique des réfugiés, ÉOR) competed at the 2024 Summer Olympics in Paris, France. 37 athletes from 11 countries of origin represented the Refugee Olympic Team at the 2024 Summer Olympics in 12 sports, with 14 of the 37 athletes being Iranians.

Yahya Al Ghotany and Cindy Ngamba were the delegation's flagbearers during the opening ceremony.

Ngamba was the sole Olympian to have achieved a bronze medal in women's 75 kg in boxing. Notable athletes include Manizha Talash who was ultimately disqualified in B-Girls event in breaking for displaying a political flag and Eyeru Tesfoam Gebru who failed to finish the race in women's individual road race in cycling.

== Medalists ==
Cindy Ngamba won a bronze medal, becoming the first-ever Olympian to win a medal for the Refugee Olympic Team at the Olympic Games.

Medal	Name	Sport	Event	Date
(bronze) Bronze	Cindy Ngamba	Boxing	Women's middleweight	8 August

== Team selection ==
On 2 May 2024, the IOC announced that 36 athletes would represent the Refugee Olympic Team, before adding the 37th athlete afterward.

Athlete	Country of origin	Host NOC	Sport	Event
Dorian Keletela	Republic of the Congo	France	Athletics	Men's 100 m
Musa Suliman	Sudan	Switzerland	Athletics	Men's 800 m
Dominic Lobalu	South Sudan	Switzerland	Athletics	Men's 5000 m
Jamal Abdelmaji Eisa Mohammed	Sudan	Israel	Athletics	Men's 10,000 m
Tachlowini Gabriyesos	Eritrea	Israel	Athletics	Men's marathon
Mohammad Amin Alsalami	Syria	Germany	Athletics	Men's long jump
Perina Lokure	South Sudan	Kenya	Athletics	Women's 800 m
Farida Abaroge	Ethiopia	France	Athletics	Women's 1500 m
Dorsa Yavarivafa	Iran	Great Britain	Badminton	Women's singles
Omid Ahmadisafa	Iran	Germany	Boxing	Men's flyweight (51 kg)
Cindy Ngamba	Cameroon	Great Britain	Boxing	Women's middleweight (75kg)
Manizha Talash	Afghanistan	Spain	Breaking	B-Girls
Amir Rezanejad	Iran	Germany	Canoeing	Men's slalom C-1
Fernando Jorge	Cuba	United States	Canoeing	Men's sprint C-1 1000 m
Saeid Fazloula	Iran	Germany	Canoeing	Men's sprint K-1 1000 m
Saman Soltani	Iran	Austria	Canoeing	Women's sprint K-1 500 m
Amir Ansari	Afghanistan	Sweden	Cycling	Men's road time trial
Eyeru Tesfoam Gebru	Ethiopia	France	Cycling	Women's road race
Mohammad Rashnonezhad	Iran	Netherlands	Judo	Men's −60 kg Mixed team
Sibghatullah Arab	Afghanistan	Germany	Judo	Men's −81 kg Mixed team
Adnan Khankan	Syria	Germany	Judo	Men's −100 kg Mixed team
Muna Dahouk	Syria	Netherlands	Judo	Women's −57 kg Mixed team
Nigara Shaheen	Afghanistan	Canada	Judo	Women's −63 kg Mixed team
Mahboubeh Barbari Zharfi	Iran	Germany	Judo	Women's +78 kg Mixed team
Francisco Edilio Centeno Nieves	Venezuela	Mexico	Shooting	Men's 10 m air pistol
Luna Solomon	Eritrea	Switzerland	Shooting	Women's 10 m air rifle
Alaa Maso	Syria	Germany	Swimming	Men's 50 m freestyle
Matin Balsini	Iran	Great Britain	Swimming	Men's 200 m butterfly
Hadi Tiran	Iran	Italy	Taekwondo	Men's −58 kg
Yahya Al-Ghotany	Syria	Jordan	Taekwondo	Men's −68 kg
Farzad Mansouri	Afghanistan	Great Britain	Taekwondo	Men's −80 kg
Kasra Mehdipournejad	Iran	Germany	Taekwondo	Men's +80 kg
Dina Pouryounes	Iran	Netherlands	Taekwondo	Women's −49 kg
Ramiro Mora Romero	Cuba	Great Britain	Weightlifting	Men's −102 kg
Yekta Jamali	Iran	Germany	Weightlifting	Women's −81 kg
Iman Mahdavi	Iran	Italy	Wrestling	Men's freestyle −74 kg
Jamal Valizadeh	Iran	France	Wrestling	Men's Greco-Roman −60 kg

== Competitors ==
Masomah Ali Zada was the chef de mission for the team.

The following is the list of number of competitors from Refugee Olympic Team at the Games.

Sport	Men	Women	Total
Athletics	6	2	8
Badminton	0	1	1
Boxing	1	1	2
Breaking	0	1	1
Canoeing	3	1	4
Cycling	1	1	2
Judo	3	3	6
Shooting	1	1	2
Swimming	2	0	2
Taekwondo	4	1	5
Weightlifting	1	1	2
Wrestling	2	0	2
Total	24	13	37

== Athletics ==
Key

- Note–Ranks given for track events are within the athlete's heat only
- Q = Qualified for the next round
- q = Qualified for the next round as a fastest loser or, in field events, by position without achieving the qualifying target
- qR = Advanced to next round by referee
- R = Qualified for the repechage round
- NR = National record
- N/A = Round not applicable for the event
- Bye = Athlete not required to compete in round

Track and road events
Men

Athlete	Event	Heat		Repechage		Semifinal		Final	
Athlete	Event	Result	Rank	Result	Rank	Result	Rank	Result	Rank
Dorian Keletela	100 m	10.58	8	—N/a		Did not advance			
Musa Suliman	800 m	1:49.61	9 R	1:50.11	9	Did not advance			
Dominic Lobalu	5000 m	14:15.49	15 qR	—N/a				13:15.27	4
Jamal Abdelmaji Eisa Mohammed	10,000 m	—N/a						27:35.92 PB	18
Tachlowini Gabriyesos	Marathon	—N/a						2:12:47	42

Women

Athlete	Event	Heat		Repechage		Semifinal		Final	
Athlete	Event	Result	Rank	Result	Rank	Result	Rank	Result	Rank
Perina Lokure	800 m	2:08.20 PB	9 R	2:11.33	7	Did not advance			
Farida Abaroge	1500 m	4:29.27 SB	14 R	4:30.53	12	Did not advance			

Field events

Athlete	Event	Qualification		Final	
Athlete	Event	Distance	Position	Distance	Position
Mohammad Amin Alsalami	Men's long jump	7.24	29	Did not advance	

== Badminton ==
The Refugee Olympic Team entered one badminton player into the Olympic tournament. Former Iranian badminton player, Dorsa Yavarivafa entered the games after being selected by the IOC.

Athlete	Event	Group stage			Elimination	Quarter-final	Semi-final	Final / BM	
Athlete	Event	Opposition Score	Opposition Score	Rank	Opposition Score	Opposition Score	Opposition Score	Opposition Score	Rank
Dorsa Yavarivafa	Women's singles	Yeo (SGP); L (7–21, 8–21)	Ludik (MRI); L (5–21, 11–21)	3	Did not advance				

== Boxing ==
Refugee Olympic Team entered two boxers. Former Cameroonian boxer, Cindy Ngamba (women's middleweight) secured the one spot the Refugee Olympic Team squad in her weight division by finishing in the top two at the 2024 World Boxing Olympic Qualification Tournament 1 in Busto Arsizio, Italy. Later on, the IOC announced that Cindy and former Iranian boxer, Omid Ahmadisafa would compete at the Games.

Athlete	Event	Round of 32	Round of 16	Quarterfinals	Semifinals	Final	
Athlete	Event	Opposition Result	Opposition Result	Opposition Result	Opposition Result	Opposition Result	Rank
Omid Ahmadisafa	Men's 51 kg	Roscoe (USA); L 0–5	Did not advance				
Cindy Ngamba	Women's 75 kg	—N/a	Thibeault (CAN); W 3–2	Michel (FRA); W 5–0	Bylon (PAN); L 1–4	Did not advance	3rd place, bronze medalist(s)

== Breaking ==
Refugee Olympic Team entered a breakdancer to compete in the B-Girl dual battles for Paris 2024. Former Afghan B-Girl Manizha Talash (Talash) qualified for the games following the announcement of Refugee Olympic Team by IOC.

During her event Talash wore a cape with the phrase "Free Afghan Women" on it in the pre-qualifier round. She lost the round 0–3 to India Sardjoe from the Netherlands, before the result was updated to her being disqualified for displaying a political slogan, which is a violation of rule 50 of the Olympic Charter.

Athlete	Nickname	Event	Pre-qualifier	Round robin				Quarterfinal	Semifinal	Final / BM	
Athlete	Nickname	Event	Opposition Result	Opposition Result	Opposition Result	Opposition Result	Rank	Opposition Result	Opposition Result	Opposition Result	Rank
Manizha Talash	Talash	B-Girls	Sardjoe (NED); L 0–3 DSQ	Did not advance							

== Canoeing ==
Key

- H = Qualified for heats
- R = Qualified for the repechage round

=== Slalom ===
Former Iranian canoeists, Amir Rezanejad confirmed a boat in the men's C-1 for the Games, after being selected by the IOC to represent the Refugee Olympic Team.

Athlete	Event	Preliminary						Semifinal		Final	
Athlete	Event	Run 1	Rank	Run 2	Rank	Best	Rank	Time	Rank	Time	Rank
Amir Rezanejad	Men's C-1	116.16	19	119.48	19	116.16	19	Did not advance			

Kayak cross

Athlete	Event	Time trial		Round 1	Repechage	Heat	Quarterfinal	Semifinal	Final	
Athlete	Event	Time	Rank	Position	Position	Position	Position	Position	Position	Rank
Amir Rezanejad	Men's KX-1	79.15	32	DNF R	3	Did not advance				36

=== Sprint ===
Two Former Iranian canoeists, Saeid Fazloula and Saman Soltani; and a former Cuban canoeist, Fernando Jorge; confirmed a boat in their respective classes for the Games, after being selected by the IOC to represent the Refugee Olympic Team.

Athlete	Event	Heats		Quarterfinals		Semifinals		Final	
Athlete	Event	Time	Rank	Time	Rank	Time	Rank	Time	Rank
Fernando Jorge	Men's C-1 1000 m	3:54.90	3 Q	4:06.63	4	Did not advance			22
Saeid Fazloula	Men's K-1 1000 m	3:42.80	4 Q	3:40.94	4	Did not advance			23
Saman Soltani	Women's K-1 500 m	2:02.19	7 Q	2:01.43	6	Did not advance			38

Qualification Legend: Q = Qualify to next round; FA = Qualify to final (medal); FB = Qualify to final B (non-medal)

== Cycling ==
=== Road ===
Refugee Olympic Team, entered two cyclist to compete at the games. Ex-Afghan cyclist Amir Ansari, and ex-Ethiopian cyclist Eyeru Tesfoam Gebru were nominated by the IOC to compete at the games.

Athlete	Event	Time	Rank
Amir Ansari	Men's time trial	40:26.14	30
Eyeru Tesfoam Gebru	Women's road race	DNF	—

== Judo ==
Refugee Olympic Team entered 6 judoka (three men and three women) into Paris 2024. The team including; Two ex-Iranian judoka, Mohammad Rashnonezhad and Mahboubeh Barbari Zharfi; two ex-Afghan judoka, Sibghatullah Arab and Nigara Shaheen; two ex-Syrian judoka, Adnan Khankan and Muna Dahouk. Dahouk, who left Syria for the Netherlands with her family in 2019, told CBS that she wants to use her platform as a refugee athlete to break down stereotypes and challenge misconceptions about refugees: "I will represent the refugees around the world – to show people what the refugees can do. We are not weak people. We can be athletes, we can be students, we can be anything we want." Khankan, aged 30 and originally from Damascus, fled Syria in 2015 and now lives in Cologne in Germany; he describes Muhammad Ali as his inspiration.

Athlete	Event	Round of 32	Round of 16	Quarterfinals	Semifinals	Repechage	Final / BM	Rank
Athlete	Event	Opposition Result	Opposition Result	Opposition Result	Opposition Result	Opposition Result	Opposition Result	Rank
Mohammad Rashnonezhad	Men's −66 kg	Khyar (FRA); L 00–10	Did not advance					17
Sibghatullah Arab	Men's −81 kg	Casse (BEL); L 01–11	Did not advance					17
Adnan Khankan	Men's −100 kg	Eich (SUI); L 00–10	Did not advance					17
Muna Dahouk	Women's −57 kg	Jiménez (PAN); L 00–10	Did not advance					17
Nigara Shaheen	Women's −63 kg	Awiti (MEX); L 00–10	Did not advance					17
Mahboubeh Barbari Zharfi	Women's +78 kg	Morillo (DOM); L 00–10	Did not advance					17

Mixed

Athlete	Event	Round of 32	Round of 16	Quarterfinals	Semifinals	Repechage	Final / BM	
Athlete	Event	Opposition Result	Opposition Result	Opposition Result	Opposition Result	Opposition Result	Opposition Result	Rank
Mohammad Rashnonezhad; Sibghatullah Arab; Adnan Khankan; Muna Dahouk; Nigara Shaheen; Mahboubeh Barbari Zharfi	Team	Spain; L 0–4	Did not advance					17

== Shooting ==
Two shooters achieved quota places for the Refugee Olympics Team. Former Eritrean sport-shooter, Luna Solomon; and former Venezuelan sport-shooter Francisco Edilio Centeno; both would compete at the Games after being announced by the IOC.

Athlete	Event	Qualification		Final	
Athlete	Event	Points	Rank	Points	Rank
Francisco Edilio Centeno	Men's 10 m air pistol	562	30	Did not advance	
Luna Solomon	Women's 10 m air rifle	601.2	43	Did not advance	

== Swimming ==
Two swimmers; Alaa Maso (former Syrian swimmer) and Matin Balsini (former Iranian); would represent the Refugee Olympic Team, after being announced by the IOC.

Athlete	Event	Heat		Semifinal		Final	
Athlete	Event	Time	Rank	Time	Rank	Time	Rank
Alaa Maso	Men's 50 m freestyle	23.90	47	Did not advance			
Matin Balsini	Men's 200 m butterfly	2:00.77	26	Did not advance			

Qualifiers for the latter rounds (Q) of all events were decided on a time only basis, therefore positions shown are overall results versus competitors in all heats.

== Taekwondo ==
Refugee Olympic Team announced five athletes to compete at the games. Three former Iranians; Hadi Tiran, Kasra Mehdipournejad and Dina Pouryounes; one former Syrian, Yahya Al-Ghotany; and one former Afghan, Farzad Mansouri; were all set to compete at the games.

Originally, two athletes already qualified for the games; Ali Reza Abbasi qualified for the games by winning the semifinal round in his division at the 2024 Asian Qualification Tournament in Tai'an, China; and Kimia Alizadeh qualified for the games by winning the semifinal round in her division at the 2024 European Qualification Tournament in Sofia, Bulgaria. Later on, both of them could not compete at the games, because Kimia received her Bulgarian passport, which made her represent the Bulgarian team; and Ali's quota was declined by the IOC and being replaced by Yahya.

Athlete	Event	Qualification	Round of 16	Quarterfinals	Semifinals	Repechage	Final / BM	
Athlete	Event	Opposition Result	Opposition Result	Opposition Result	Opposition Result	Opposition Result	Opposition Result	Rank
Hadi Tiran	Men's −58 kg	Yaser (PLE); L 3–4, 0–5	Did not advance					17=
Yahya Al Ghotany	Men's −68 kg	Lo (HKG); L 0–14, 4–16	Did not advance					17
Farzad Mansouri	Men's −80 kg	—N/a	Nickolas (USA); L 7–10, 1–3	Did not advance				11=
Kasra Mehdipournejad	Men's +80 kg	Mara (PNG); W 3–4, 6–0, 15–2	Cissé (CIV); L 1–6, 1–13	Did not advance				11=
Dina Pouryounes	Women's −49 kg	—N/a	Guo (CHN); L 4–5, 0–12	Did not advance		Dinçel (TUR); L 4–13, 1–13	Did not advance	7=

== Weightlifting ==
Refugee Olympic Team entered two weightlifters into the Olympic competition. Former Cuban weightlifters, Ramiro Mora Romero; and former Iranian weightlifters Yekta Jamali secured their spots, respectively in men's under 102 kg and women's under 81 kg, after being nominated by the IOC.

Athlete	Event	Snatch		Clean & Jerk		Total	Rank
Athlete	Event	Result	Rank	Result	Rank	Total	Rank
Ramiro Mora Romero	Men's −102 kg	166	10	210	7	376	7
Yekta Jamali	Women's −81 kg	103	9	128	9	231	9

== Wrestling ==
Refugee Olympics Team entered two wrestlers to compete at the Olympic competition. Former Iranian wrestlers, Iman Mahdavi and Jamal Valizadeh entered the games after being announced to represent the team by the IOC.

Key:

- VT (ranking points: 5–0 or 0–5) – Victory by fall.
- VB (ranking points: 5–0 or 0–5) – Victory by injury (VF for forfeit, VA for withdrawal or disqualification)
- PP (ranking points: 3–1 or 1–3) – Decision by points – the loser with technical points.
- PO (ranking points: 3–0 or 0–3) – Decision by points – the loser without technical points.
- ST (ranking points: 4–0 or 0–4) – Great superiority – the loser without technical points and a margin of victory of at least 8 (Greco-Roman) or 10 (freestyle) points.
- SP (ranking points: 4–1 or 1–4) – Technical superiority – the loser with technical points and a margin of victory of at least 8 (Greco-Roman) or 10 (freestyle) points.

Freestyle

Athlete	Event	Round of 16	Quarterfinal	Semifinal	Repechage	Final / BM	
Athlete	Event	Opposition Result	Opposition Result	Opposition Result	Opposition Result	Opposition Result	Rank
Iman Mahdavi	Men's 74 kg	Tsabolov (SRB); L 0–4ST	Did not advance				17

Greco-Roman

Athlete	Event	Round of 16	Quarterfinal	Semifinal	Repechage	Final / BM	
Athlete	Event	Opposition Result	Opposition Result	Opposition Result	Opposition Result	Opposition Result	Rank
Jamal Valizadeh	Men's 60 kg	Bakhromov (UZB); L 0–4ST	Did not advance				17
