= Canoeing at the 2024 Summer Olympics – Qualification =

This article details the qualifying phase for canoeing at the 2024 Summer Olympics. Similar to the previous editions, the International Olympic Committee and the International Canoe Federation (ICF) had established a qualification system for both slalom and sprint canoeing. The quota places had already been set for each event by the ICF in October 2022.

== Qualification summary ==
NOC	Slalom						Sprint										Total	
NOC	K1 M	C1 M	KX1 M	K1 W	C1 W	KX1 W	Men					Women					Boats	Athletes
NOC	K1 M	C1 M	KX1 M	K1 W	C1 W	KX1 W	K1 1000	K2 500	K4 500	C1 1000	C2 500	K1 500	K2 500	K4 500	C1 200	C2 500	Boats	Athletes
Algeria				Yes		Yes											2	1
Andorra					Yes	Yes											2	1
Angola											Yes						1	2
Argentina							Yes					Yes					2	2
Australia	Yes	Yes	Yes	Yes	Yes	Yes	Yes	Yes	Yes			Yes		Yes			11	15
Austria	Yes		Yes	Yes		Yes											4	2
Belgium							Yes						Yes				2	3
Brazil	Yes		Yes	Yes	Yes	Yes	Yes			Yes	Yes	Yes			Yes		10	8
Bulgaria												Yes					1	1
Canada		Yes	Yes		Yes	Yes			Yes	Yes		Yes		Yes	Yes	Yes	10	15
Chile															Yes	Yes	2	2
China	Yes		Yes		Yes	Yes			Yes		Yes		Yes	Yes	Yes	Yes	9	17
Chinese Taipei	Yes		Yes	Yes		Yes				Yes							3	3
Colombia															Yes		1	1
Comoros	Yes		Yes														2	1
Croatia		Yes	Yes									Yes					3	2
Cuba										Yes					Yes	Yes	3	3
Czech Republic	Yes	Yes	Yes	Yes	Yes	Yes	Yes	Yes		Yes	Yes						10	9
Denmark									Yes			Yes	Yes				3	6
Egypt												Yes					1	1
France	Yes	Yes	Yes	Yes	Yes	Yes	Yes			Yes	Yes	Yes	Yes		Yes	Yes	13	13
Germany	Yes	Yes	Yes	Yes	Yes	Yes		Yes	Yes	Yes	Yes		Yes	Yes		Yes	13	21
Great Britain	Yes	Yes	Yes	Yes	Yes	Yes											6	4
Guam															Yes		1	1
Hungary							Yes	Yes	Yes	Yes	Yes	Yes		Yes		Yes	8	15
Iran							Yes			Yes							2	2
Ireland	Yes	Yes	Yes	Yes	Yes	Yes											5	3
Italy	Yes	Yes	Yes	Yes	Yes	Yes				Yes	Yes						8	7
Japan	Yes	Yes	Yes	Yes		Yes											5	3
Kazakhstan								Yes			Yes					Yes	3	6
Lithuania								Yes	Yes								2	5
Mexico				Yes		Yes							Yes				3	3
Moldova										Yes						Yes	2	3
Morocco	Yes		Yes				Yes										3	2
Netherlands		Yes	Yes	Yes	Yes	Yes							Yes				6	5
New Zealand	Yes		Yes	Yes		Yes			Yes		Yes	Yes	Yes	Yes			10	13
Nigeria																Yes	1	2
Norway														Yes			1	4
Poland	Yes	Yes	Yes	Yes		Yes		Yes		Yes			Yes	Yes	Yes	Yes	12	16
Portugal							Yes	Yes				Yes					3	4
Romania										Yes	Yes						2	3
Samoa							Yes					Yes					2	2
São Tomé and Príncipe															Yes		1	1
Senegal		Yes													Yes		2	2
Serbia									Yes			Yes		Yes			3	8
Singapore												Yes					1	1
Slovakia	Yes	Yes	Yes	Yes	Yes	Yes											6	4
Slovenia	Yes	Yes	Yes	Yes	Yes	Yes											6	4
South Africa				Yes				Yes					Yes				3	5
Spain	Yes	Yes	Yes	Yes	Yes	Yes	Yes	Yes	Yes	Yes	Yes	Yes		Yes	Yes	Yes	14	19
Sweden	Yes		Yes				Yes					Yes	Yes				5	5
Switzerland	Yes		Yes	Yes		Yes											4	2
Tunisia	Yes									Yes							2	2
Ukraine					Yes	Yes			Yes	Yes					Yes	Yes	6	8
United States		Yes	Yes	Yes	Yes	Yes		Yes							Yes		7	5
Uruguay							Yes										1	1
Uzbekistan							Yes					Yes			Yes		3	3
Vietnam															Yes		1	1
Total: 58 NOCs	22	17	24	21	17	24	15	11	10	16	12	16	11	10	15	13	255	300

== Slalom ==
For the slalom events, the men and women will each compete in C-1, K-1, and the inaugural KX-1 (kayak cross). Quota places are allocated to NOCs, not to specific canoeists. NOCs are limited to one boat for each event. These qualification spots will be awarded as follows:

- World Championships (for canoe and kayak singles) – The highest-ranked eligible canoeists in every single boat (considering only one boat per NOC) will obtain a quota place for their respective NOC. Fifteen qualification spots are available in the K-1 events and twelve in the C-1.
- Global Qualification Tournament (for kayak cross) – The top three eligible NOCs in each kayak cross event will be awarded a quota place.
- Continental Qualification Events – NOCs eligible for qualification in a given event will secure a single quota place for their respective continent.
- Host country – As the host country, France reserves one quota place each for the men's and women's slalom canoe and kayak singles. If one or more French slalom canoeists qualify regularly and directly, their slots will be reallocated to the next highest-ranked eligible NOCs in the kayak singles from the 2023 ICF World Championships, or any of the continental qualification tournaments.
- Universality places – Two invitational places will be entitled to eligible NOCs interested to have their canoeists (whether slalom or sprint) compete in Paris 2024 as granted by the Universality principle.
- Reallocation – Unused quota spots will be reallocated.

=== Timeline ===
Event	Date	Venue
2023 European Games	June 29 – July 2, 2023	Kraków, Poland
2023 ICF Canoe Slalom World Championships	September 19–24, 2023	(United Kingdom) Lee Valley, Great Britain
2023 Asian Canoe Slalom Championships	October 27–29, 2023	Tokyo, Japan
2024 Oceania Canoe Slalom Championships	January 26–28, 2024	Penrith, Australia
2024 African Canoe Slalom Olympic Qualifiers	February 9–11, 2024	(France) Sainte-Suzanne, Réunion
2024 Pan American Canoe Slalom Olympic Qualifiers	March 15–17, 2024	Rio de Janeiro, Brazil
2024 ICF Kayak Cross Global Qualification Tournament	June 7–9, 2024	Prague, Czech Republic

=== Qualification table ===
Event	Men's K-1	Men's C-1	Men's KX-1	Women's K-1	Women's C-1	Women's KX-1
Host nation	—	—	—	—	—	—
2023 World Championships	Great Britain; Czech Republic; Italy; Switzerland; Morocco; Australia; Slovenia; Poland; Spain; China; Sweden; New Zealand; France; Japan; Ireland	Slovenia; Poland; Germany; Czech Republic; Slovakia; Great Britain; France; Italy; Ireland; Croatia; United States; Spain	—	Germany; New Zealand; Poland; Great Britain; Italy; Slovakia; Netherlands; France; Spain; Switzerland; Czech Republic; Austria; Brazil; Slovenia; Japan	Andorra; United States; Australia; Great Britain; Czech Republic; Germany; Slovakia; France; Brazil; Spain; Italy; Ukraine	—
2023 European Games	Austria	Netherlands	—	Ireland	Slovenia	—
2023 Asian Qualifier	Chinese Taipei	Japan	—	Chinese Taipei	China	—
2024 Oceania Championships	—	Australia	—	—	—	—
2024 African Qualifier	Tunisia	Senegal	—	—	—	—
2024 Pan American Qualifier	Brazil	Canada	—	Mexico	Canada	—
2024 Kayak Cross Global Qualifier	—		France; Germany; Spain	—		Australia; France; Great Britain
Universality Places	Comoros		—			—
Reallocation	Slovakia (Note: France obtains a quota through the 2023 World Championships. Therefore, the host country place is reallocated to the next eligible NOC, not yet qualified, in the Kayak single event for the same gender at the 2023 World Championships. Slovakia receive the reallocated quota in the men's event and Australia receive the reallocated quota in the women's event); Germany (Note: There was not enough competing NOCs at the Oceanian Qualifier neither in the World Ranking, therefore the quota gets reallocated to the best next NOC in the World Rankings from any continent.)		—	Australia; Algeria; United States (Note: There were not enough competing NOCs at the African Qualifier neither in the World Ranking, therefore the quota gets reallocated to the best next NOC in the World Rankings from any continent.)	Ireland; Netherlands	—
Invitation Places	—	Refugee Olympic Team	—	—	—	—
Total	22	18	3	21	17	3

== Sprint ==
NOCs are limited to two boats per sprint event, a maximum of six per gender in kayaking, and a maximum of three per gender in canoeing, constituting a roster of eighteen canoeists. The qualification pathway enables the NOC to participate and not necessarily those who earn a direct quota place. These qualification spots will be awarded as follows:

- World Championships – The highest-ranked eligible canoeists in every single boat (considering only one boat per NOC) will obtain a quota place for their respective NOC. Five-boat spots are available in the C-1 events with an additional place reserved for the host country each in the men's 1000 m and women's 200 m, seven in the K-1 events (including a berth reserved for the host country in the men's 1000 m and women's 500 m), six in the K-2 500 m, eight in the C-2 500 m, and ten in the K-4 500 m.
- Continental Qualification Events – NOCs eligible for qualification in a given event will secure an assigned number of quota places for their respective continent. For the K-1 and C-1 events, two-boat spots will be awarded for each continent, except for Africa and Oceania (both of which will earn a single quota place). For the K-2 and C-2 events, a single-boat berth is assigned to each continent based on the results from the World Championships: the highest-ranked NOCs eligible for qualification across five continents will secure a direct quota place.
- Host country – As the host country, France reserves one quota place for the events listed in the World Championships section. If one or more French slalom canoeists qualify regularly and directly, their slots will be reallocated to the next highest-ranked eligible NOCs in the corresponding event from the 2023 ICF World Championships.
- Universality places – Two invitational places will be entitled to eligible NOCs interested to have their canoeists (whether slalom or sprint) compete in Paris 2024 as granted by the Universality principle.
- Reallocation – Unused quota spots will be reallocated. This occurs because several canoeists who qualified for a larger boat category may also compete in a smaller category, freeing up quota place(s) that the NOC has earned in a smaller category.

=== Timeline ===
Event	Date	Venue
2023 ICF Canoe Sprint World Championships	August 23–27, 2023	Duisburg, Germany
2023 African Canoe Sprint Olympic Qualifiers	November 23–26, 2023	Abuja, Nigeria
2024 Oceania Canoe Sprint Qualifier	February 14–18, 2024	Penrith, Australia
2024 Asian Canoe Sprint Championships	April 18–21, 2024	Tokyo, Japan
2024 Pan American Canoe Sprint Olympic Qualifiers	April 23–25, 2024	Sarasota, United States
2024 European Canoe Sprint Qualifier	May 8–9, 2024	Szeged, Hungary

=== Qualification table ===
Event	2023 World Championships	Continental Qualification					Additional	Total
Men Kayak	2023 World Championships	Africa	Oceania	Asia	Americas	Europe	Additional	Total
K-1 1000 m	France*; Portugal; Hungary; Australia; Czech Republic; Belgium; Spain; Sweden; Argentina	Morocco	Samoa	Uzbekistan; Iran	Uruguay; Brazil	Individual Neutral Athletes^{BLR} Denmark	Refugee Olympic Team	18
K-2 500 m	Portugal; Hungary^{AQ} Spain^{AQ} Australia; Czech Republic; Germany; Lithuania^{AQ}	South Africa	New Zealand	Kazakhstan	United States	Poland	—	12
K-4 500 m	Germany; Hungary; Ukraine; Australia; Denmark; Lithuania; Spain; Serbia; Canada; China	—						10
Event	2023 World Championships	Continental Qualification					Additional	Total
Men Canoe	2023 World Championships	Africa	Oceania	Asia	Americas	Europe	Additional	Total
C-1 1000 m	France*; Czech Republic; Romania; Germany; Poland; Hungary; Brazil; Moldova	Tunisia	~~Australia~~; Ukraine	Iran; Chinese Taipei	Cuba; Canada	Italy; Spain	Refugee Olympic Team	17
C-2 500 m	Germany; China; Spain; France; Hungary; Romania; Italy; Czech Republic	Angola	New Zealand	Kazakhstan	Brazil	Individual Neutral Athletes^{RUS}	—	13
Event	2023 World Championships	Continental Qualification					Additional	Total
Women Kayak	2023 World Championships	Africa	Oceania	Asia	Americas	Europe	Additional	Total
K-1 500 m	France*; New Zealand; Denmark; Hungary; Serbia; Australia; Canada; Portugal; Sweden; Croatia; Bulgaria; Spain	Egypt	Samoa	Uzbekistan; Singapore	Argentina; Brazil	Ukraine; Czech Republic	Refugee Olympic Team	21
K-2 500 m	Denmark; Poland; Germany; Belgium; France; Sweden	South Africa	New Zealand	China	Mexico	Netherlands	—	11
K-4 500 m	New Zealand; Poland; Spain; China; Australia; Serbia; Hungary; Germany; Norway; Canada	—						10
Event	2023 World Championships	Continental Qualification					Additional	Total
Women Canoe	2023 World Championships	Africa	Oceania	Asia	Americas	Europe	Additional	Total
C-1 200 m	France*; Cuba; Spain; China; United States; Chile; Canada; Ukraine; Poland	Senegal; São Tomé and Príncipe^{UP}	~~Australia~~; Guam	Uzbekistan; Vietnam	Brazil; Colombia	Hungary; Individual Neutral Athletes^{RUS}	—	17
C-2 500 m	China; Spain; Canada; Germany; Hungary; Cuba; Moldova; Ukraine	Nigeria	Poland^	Kazakhstan	Chile	~~Individual Neutral Athletes^{BLR}~~ France	—	13

^* Host quota
- Italic: National federation has qualified a boat but the athlete that did this was already counted in another boat
- ^{AQ}: National federation has qualified a boat but one of two athletes that did this was already counted in another boat
- ^{UP}: National federation has received an invitation from the Tripartite Commission
- ^{RUS}: Individual Neutral Athletes from Russia
- ^{BLR}: Individual Neutral Athletes from Belarus
- ^: ICF decided that some events in Africa and Oceania require reallocation of spare spots to the World Championships lists because the events shorten eligible competitors.
- º: ICF decided that two quota places are combined and reallocated to the highest-ranked NOC vying for qualification in a larger boat category, should they be available from team boats in the same gender and category.
