= 2024 European Taekwondo Olympic Qualification Tournament =

Taekwondo competition

The 2024 European Qualification Tournament for Paris Olympic Games was held at Sports Hall Engineer Yanko Yankov, Sofia, Bulgaria on 9 and 10 March 2024. Each country could enter a maximum of 2 male and 2 female divisions with only one athlete in each division. The two finalists for each division qualified for the Olympic Games under their NOC.

== Men ==
=== −58 kg ===
10 March

Round of 16
Niko Saarinen (FIN) | 2
Hristiyan Georgiev (BUL) | 0
Aymen Achnine (NED) | 0
Hadi Tiran (EOR) | 2
Ernest Merdanaj (ALB) | 2
Serghei Uscov (MDA) | 0
Georgii Gurtsiev (AIN) | 2
Saidali Aliev (ARM) | 0
Rui Bragança (POR) | 2
Dmitriy Nagaev (ISR) | 0
Bleron Ademi (KOS) | 0
Lev Korneev (SRB) | 2

Quarterfinals
Jack Woolley (IRL) | 2
Niko Saarinen (FIN) | 0
Hadi Tiran (EOR) | 1
Ernest Merdanaj (ALB) | 2
Georgii Gurtsiev (AIN) | 2
Rui Bragança (POR) | 0
Lev Korneev (SRB) | 2
Khaled Abdel-Halim (GER) | 0

Semifinals
Jack Woolley (IRL) | 2
Ernest Merdanaj (ALB) | 1
Georgii Gurtsiev (AIN) | 2
Lev Korneev (SRB) | 1

3rd place
Ernest Merdanaj (ALB) | 0
Lev Korneev (SRB) | 2

=== −68 kg ===
10 March

Round of 32
| Jesse van Vulpen (NED) | 2–0 | Tomáš Sittek (CZE) |
| Sargis Sargsyan (ARM) | 0–2 | Zinedin Bećović (MNE) |
| Juirdo Cani (ALB) | 2–0 | Miroslav Frgolec (SVK) |
| Leo Speight (ISL) | 2–1 | Beka Kavtaradze (GEO) |
| Leroy Nsilu Dilandu (IRL) | 2–0 | Samuel Tarini (SMR) |
| Kristjan Vuks (EST) | 0–2 | Jaouad Achab (BEL) |
| Warrick Galland (SUI) | 0–2 | Dmitri Șuleac (MDA) |

Round of 16
Marko Golubić (CRO) | 2
Jesse van Vulpen (NED) | 1
Mitko Dzhordzhev (BUL) | 1
Sebastian Thune (NOR) | 2
Imran Özkaya (GER) | 0
Zinedin Bećović (MNE) | 2
Juirdo Cani (ALB) | 0
Ali Alian (SWE) | 2
Konstantinos Chamalidis (GRE) | 2
Leo Speight (ISL) | 0
Leroy Nsilu Dilandu (IRL) | 0
Nimrod Krivishkiy (ISR) | 2
Otto Jørgensen (DEN) | 2
Jaouad Achab (BEL) | 0
Dmitri Șuleac (MDA) | 0
Levente Józsa (HUN) | 2

Quarterfinals
Marko Golubić (CRO) | 2
Sebastian Thune (NOR) | 0
Zinedin Bećović (MNE) | 0
Ali Alian (SWE) | 2
Konstantinos Chamalidis (GRE) | 1
Nimrod Krivishkiy (ISR) | 2
Otto Jørgensen (DEN) | 0
Levente Józsa (HUN) | 2

Semifinals
Marko Golubić (CRO) | 2
Ali Alian (SWE) | 1
Nimrod Krivishkiy (ISR) | 0
Levente Józsa (HUN) | 2

3rd place
Ali Alian (SWE) | 2
Nimrod Krivishkiy (ISR) | 0

=== −80 kg ===
9 March

Round of 32
| Evangelos Charalambous (CYP) | 2–0 | Stefano Crescentini (SMR) |
| Júlio Ferreira (POR) | 2–1 | Jon Gashi (KOS) |
| Bardia Mirzaei (FIN) | 1–2 | Vasilije Peruničić (MNE) |
| Mihai Cristescu (ROU) | 0–2 | Ivan Trajkovič (SLO) |

Round of 16
Stefan Takov (SRB) | 2
Evangelos Charalambous (CYP) | 1
Szymon Piątkowski (POL) | 0
Kostiantyn Kostenevych (UKR) | 2
Zurab Kintsurashvili (GEO) | 0
Maksim Khramtsov (AIN) | 2
Júlio Ferreira (POR) | 2
Badr Achab (BEL) | 1
Apostolos Telikostoglou (GRE) | 2
Vasilije Peruničić (MNE) | 0
Kasra Mehdipournejad (EOR) | 0
Edi Hrnic (DEN) | 2
Aleksandar Radojkovic (AUT) | 1
Farzad Mansouri (EOR) | 2
Ivan Trajkovič (SLO) | 0
Nedžad Husić (BIH) | 2

Quarterfinals
Stefan Takov (SRB) | 2
Kostiantyn Kostenevych (UKR) | 0
Maksim Khramtsov (AIN) | 2
Júlio Ferreira (POR) | 0
Apostolos Telikostoglou (GRE) | 0
Edi Hrnic (DEN) | 2
Farzad Mansouri (EOR) | 2
Nedžad Husić (BIH) | 1

Semifinals
Stefan Takov (SRB) | 1
Maksim Khramtsov (AIN) | 2
Edi Hrnic (DEN) | 2
Farzad Mansouri (EOR) | 1

3rd place
Stefan Takov (SRB) | 0
Farzad Mansouri (EOR) | 2

=== +80 kg ===
9 March

Round of 16
Andreas Theocharous (CYP) | 0
Milad Beigi (AZE) | 2
Dinko Šegedin (BIH) | 0
Adam Jochman (CZE) | 2
Laurenţiu Snacov (ROU) | 0
Adrian Wojtkowiak (POL) | 2
Artsiom Plonis (AIN) | 2
Erik Farmakas (SWE) | 0

Quarterfinals
Richard Ordemann (NOR) | 2
Milad Beigi (AZE) | 0
Adam Jochman (CZE) | 0
Andrii Harbar (UKR) | 2
Patrik Divkovič (SLO) | 2
Adrian Wojtkowiak (POL) | 0
Artsiom Plonis (AIN) | 2
Dejan Georgievski (MKD) | 1

Semifinals
Richard Ordemann (NOR) | 2
Andrii Harbar (UKR) | 0
Patrik Divkovič (SLO) | 2
Artsiom Plonis (AIN) | 1

3rd place
Andrii Harbar (UKR) | 0
Artsiom Plonis (AIN) | 2

== Women ==
=== −49 kg ===
9 March

Round of 16
Ela Aydin (GER) | 2
Zemfira Hasanzade (AZE) | 0
Ida Tammila (FIN) | 0
Ilenia Matonti (ITA) | 2
Indra Bodén (SWE) | 2
Naiara Liñán (AND) | 0
Matilde Ferreira (POR) | 0
Kyriaki Kouttouki (CYP) | 2
Dina Pouryounes (EOR) | 1
Mihaela Bajan (ROU) | 2
Džejla Makaš (BIH) | 2
Gerda Meištininkaitė (LTU) | 1
Aleksandra Georgieva (BUL) | 2
Jade Castillo (DEN) | 1
Uladzislava Sarokina (AIN) | 0
Avishag Semberg (ISR) | 2

Quarterfinals
Ela Aydin (GER) | 0
Ilenia Matonti (ITA) | 2
Indra Bodén (SWE) | 2
Kyriaki Kouttouki (CYP) | 0
Mihaela Bajan (ROU) | 0
Džejla Makaš (BIH) | 2
Aleksandra Georgieva (BUL) | 1
Avishag Semberg (ISR) | 2

Semifinals
Ilenia Matonti (ITA) | 2
Indra Bodén (SWE) | 0
Džejla Makaš (BIH) | 0
Avishag Semberg (ISR) | 2

3rd place
Indra Bodén (SWE) | 2
Džejla Makaš (BIH) | 0

=== −57 kg ===
9 March

Round of 32
| Diana Krush (UKR) | 2–0 | Nora Högfeldt (SWE) |
| Kimia Alizadeh (EOR) | 2–0 | Yuliya Vitko (AIN) |
| Kaja Husby Hansen (NOR) | 0–2 | Inese Tarvida (LAT) |
| Petra Ždero (BIH) | 2–0 | Gabriela Coman (ROU) |
| Ingibjörg Grétarsdóttir (ISL) | 2–0 | Helmi Härkönen (FIN) |
| Ela Marić (SRB) | 2–0 | Anna-Maria Antoniou (CYP) |
| Nigar Abdullayeva (AZE) | 0–2 | Melanie Kindl (AUT) |
| Joana Cunha (POR) | 0–2 | Martina Atanasova (BUL) |

Round of 16
Luana Márton (HUN) | 2
Diana Krush (UKR) | 0
Kimia Alizadeh (EOR) | 2
Klaudija Tvaronavičiūtė (LTU) | 0
Bodine Schoenmakers (NED) | 0
Inese Tarvida (LAT) | 2
Petra Ždero (BIH) | 0
Raheleh Asemani (BEL) | 2
Faidra Kalteki (GRE) | 2
Ingibjörg Grétarsdóttir (ISL) | 0
Ela Marić (SRB) | 0
Tatiana Minina (AIN) | 2
Dominika Hronová (CZE) | 2
Melanie Kindl (AUT) | 0
Martina Atanasova (BUL) | 2
Patrycja Adamkiewicz (POL) | 1

Quarterfinals
Luana Márton (HUN) | 1
Kimia Alizadeh (EOR) | 2
Inese Tarvida (LAT) | 2
Raheleh Asemani (BEL) | 0
Faidra Kalteki (GRE) | 0
Tatiana Minina (AIN) | 2
Dominika Hronová (CZE) | 2
Martina Atanasova (BUL) | 0

Semifinals
Kimia Alizadeh (EOR) | 2
Inese Tarvida (LAT) | 1
Tatiana Minina (AIN) | 2
Dominika Hronová (CZE) | 0

3rd place
Inese Tarvida (LAT)
Dominika Hronová (CZE) | WD

=== −67 kg ===
10 March

Round of 16
Carmen Raagmets (EST) | 0
Nina Urganaeva (ARM) | 2
Doris Pole (CRO) | 2
Karoline Gjelsvik (NOR) | 0
Andrea Berišaj (MNE) | 0
Viviana Márton (HUN) | 2
Amy Mink (NED) | 2
Miljana Reljiḱ (MKD) | 0

Quarterfinals
Cecilia Castro (ESP) | 2
Nina Urganaeva (ARM) | 0
Doris Pole (CRO) | 2
Natalia D'Angelo (ITA) | 1
Jolanta Tarvida (LAT) | 0
Viviana Márton (HUN) | 2
Amy Mink (NED) | 2
Theopoula Sarvanaki (GRE) | 0

Semifinals
Cecilia Castro (ESP) | 2
Doris Pole (CRO) | 1
Viviana Márton (HUN) | 2
Amy Mink (NED) | 0

3rd place
Doris Pole (CRO)
Amy Mink (NED) | WD

=== +67 kg ===
10 March

| Quarterfinals | | Semifinals | | 3rd place |
| Marlene Jahl (AUT) | 2 |
| Anđela Berišaj (MNE) | 1 | Marlene Jahl (AUT) | 0 |
| Hafsa Chtioui (DEN) | 1 | Polina Khan (AIN) | 2 |
| Polina Khan (AIN) | 2 | | | Marlene Jahl (AUT) | 2 |
| Dana Azran (ISR) | 2 | | | Dana Azran (ISR) | 0 |
| Mariia Kuts (UKR) | 1 | Dana Azran (ISR) | 1 |
| Petra Štolbová (CZE) | 2 | Petra Štolbová (CZE) | 2 |
| Aleksandra Kowalczuk (POL) | 0 |
