= Taekwondo at the 2024 Summer Olympics – Men's +80 kg =

Men's +80 kg at the Games of the XXXIII Olympiad
- Venue: Grand Palais
- Date: 10 August 2024
- Competitors: 17 from 17 nations

Medalists
1st place, gold medalist(s)		Arian Salimi	Iran
2nd place, silver medalist(s)		Caden Cunningham	Great Britain
3rd place, bronze medalist(s)		Rafael Alba	Cuba
3rd place, bronze medalist(s)		Cheick Sallah Cissé	Ivory Coast

The men's +80 kg competition in Taekwondo at the 2024 Summer Olympics was held on 10 August 2024 at the Grand Palais.

== Background ==
This is the seventh appearance of the men's super heavyweight category.

Vladislav Larin is a defending champion, but the IOC did not claim him neutral, Nikita Rafalovich took his spot, but lost to the eventual champion Arian Salimi, marking Iran won gold in taekwondo for the first time since Beijing 2008, in the 2024 European Taekwondo Olympic Qualification Tournament, 2020 silver medalist Dejan Georgievski lost to Artsiom Plonis and did not qualify, one of the bronze medalists, In Kyo-don did not qualify, and the only returning medalist Rafael Alba won by beating Emre Kutalmış Ateşli and lost to Caden Cunningham, the silver medalist, later, Alba won by beating the 2016 silver medalist, Abdoul Razak Issoufou and Ivan Šapina to win a bronze medal.

== Seeds ==
Every practitioner has numbered a seed.

1. Cheick Sallah Cissé (CIV) (Bronze medalist)
2. Carlos Sansores (MEX) (loser of bronze medals)
3. Ivan Šapina (CRO) (loser of bronze medals)
4. Caden Cunningham (GBR) (silver medalist)
5. Emre Kutalmış Ateşli (TUR) (round of 16)
6. Richard Ordemann (NOR) (quarterfinals)
7. Nikita Rafalovich (UZB) (loser of repechages)
8. Song Zhaoxiang (CHN) (round of 16)
9. Jonathan Healy (USA) (quarterfinals)
10. Arian Salimi (IRI) (Champion)
11. Patrik Divkovič (SLO) (round of 16)
12. Rafael Alba (CUB) (bronze medalist)
13. Abdoul Razak Issoufou (NIG) (loser of repechages)
14. Alasan Ann (GAM) (round of 16)
15. Paivou Gomis (GBS) (round of 16)
16. Gibson Mara (PNG) (qualification)
17. Kasra Mehdipournejad (EOR) (round of 16)

== Results ==
=== Gold medal match ===
Gold medal match
4	Caden Cunningham (GBR)	6	1	3
10	Arian Salimi (IRI)	3	9	6

=== Repechage ===
Repechage					Bronze Medal
					3	Ivan Šapina (CRO)	1	0
					12	Rafael Alba (CUB)	6	9
12	Rafael Alba (CUB)	0	2	6	12	Rafael Alba (CUB)	6	9
13	Abdoul Razak Issoufou (NIG)	4	0	0

Repechage					Bronze Medal
7	Nikita Rafalovich (UZB)	2	0	0
2	Carlos Sansores (MEX)	1	2	1
2	Carlos Sansores (MEX)	1	2	1	2	Carlos Sansores (MEX)	4	6	3
					1	Cheick Sallah Cissé (CIV)	5	5	5

=== Main bracket ===
==== Pool A ====
Qualification round
16	Gibson Mara (PNG)	4	0	2
Kasra Mehdipournejad (EOR)	3	6	15

Round of 16
13	Abdoul Razak Issoufou (NIG)	5	0
4	Caden Cunningham (GBR)	6	0
5	Emre Kutalmış Ateşli (TUR)	0	0
12	Rafael Alba (CUB)	3	9
9	Jonathan Healy (USA)	3	7	8
8	Song Zhaoxiang (CHN)	4	3	0
1	Cheick Sallah Cissé (CIV)	6	13
Kasra Mehdipournejad (EOR)	1	1

Quarter-finals
4	Caden Cunningham (GBR)	0	0	4
12	Rafael Alba (CUB)	0	4	2
9	Jonathan Healy (USA)	2	0
1	Cheick Sallah Cissé (CIV)	4	1

Semi-finals
4	Caden Cunningham (GBR)	11	5	5
1	Cheick Sallah Cissé (CIV)	6	7	5

==== Pool B ====
Qualification round

Round of 16
15	Paivou Gomis (GBS)	1	1
2	Carlos Sansores (MEX)	8	7
7	Nikita Rafalovich (UZB)	2	1
10	Arian Salimi (IRI)	8	5
11	Patrik Divkovič (SLO)	2	2	9
6	Richard Ordemann (NOR)	2	2	12
3	Ivan Šapina (CRO)	7	10
14	Alasan Ann (GAM)	1	1

Quarter-finals
2	Carlos Sansores (MEX)	2	4	0
10	Arian Salimi (IRI)	2	6	12
6	Richard Ordemann (NOR)	5	7	3
3	Ivan Šapina (CRO)	3	13	5

Semi-finals
10	Arian Salimi (IRI)	5	9	9
3	Ivan Šapina (CRO)	12	8	6
