= Emmanuella Atora =

Gabonese taekwondo practitioner (born 1996)

Personal information
- Born: 3 May 1996 (age 29) Libreville, Gabon

Sport
- Country: Gabon
- Sport: Taekwondo
- Weight class: Featherweight

Emmanuella Jurielcy Atora Eyeghe (born 3 May 1996) is a Gabonese taekwondo practitioner. She qualified to represent Gabon at the 2024 Summer Olympics.

== Biography ==
Atora had played football as a youth, but her father enrolled her in taekwondo in 2011. She had only two weeks to learn the sport before competing at the Gabon Taekwondo Cup, but she won the bronze medal. In 2012, she returned to the tournament and won silver before winning gold in 2013.

Atora then won several competitions in the subsequent years; aside from a bronze medal at the 2014 French World Cup, she won gold at the Champions Challenge tournament in 2014, 2015, and 2016, gold (and best fight) at the 2017 Park Master Challenge, gold at the 2018 Africa-Asia Cup and gold at the 2018 University Championship. She also competed at the African Taekwondo Championships in 2014 and at the World Taekwondo Championships and African Games in 2015. However, she did not win a medal at those events.

Atora took a break from competition for a time and had a son. Afterwards, she initially stopped competing altogether. Still, she decided to relaunch her career after receiving support from several people. She participated in the African Championships in 2021 and the 2023 World Taekwondo Grand Prix, and won the bronze medal at the 2023 Senegal Open. At the 2023 African Taekwondo Championships, she won a silver medal in the 57 kg category.

Atora was one of four Gabonese taekwondo practitioners invited to the African Taekwondo Olympic Qualification Tournament in February 2024. She defeated Nada Laaraj of Morocco to qualify for the 2024 Summer Olympics as a representative of Gabon. She was the country's first qualifier for the 2024 Olympics, its only taekwondo qualifier, and its first-ever female taekwondo qualifier. In an interview with Gabon Media Time following her win, she described her career as "I hit people for a living." In March 2024, she was Gabon's flagbearer at the African Games.
