= Eyeru Tesfoam Gebru =

Ethiopian cyclist (born 1996)

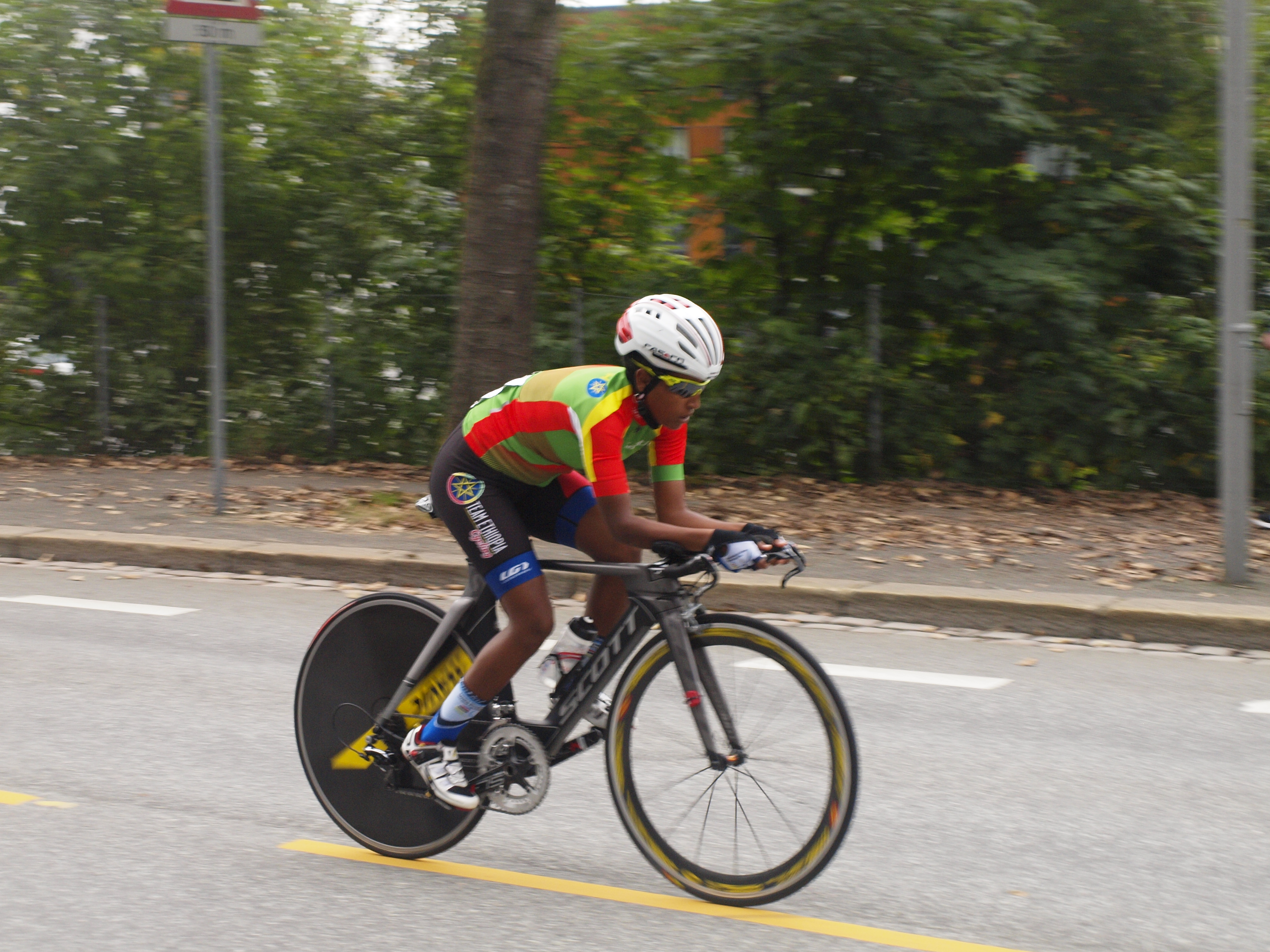
- Eyeru in 2017

Personal information
- Full name: Eyeru Tesfoam Gebru
- Born: 10 December 1996 (age 29) Aksum, Tigray Region, Ethiopia

Cycling career
- Sport: Cycling
- Current team: Team Abadie-Magnan
- Discipline: Road
- Role: Rider

Amateur team
- 2018: UCI WCC Women's Team

Professional teams
- 2019–2020: WCC Team
- 2023–: Team Grand Est–Komugi–La Fabrique

Eyeru Tesfoam Gebru (Tigrinya: እየሩ ተስፎም ገብሩ; born 10 December 1996) is an Ethiopian professional racing cyclist who currently lives in France and rides for Team Buffaz Gestion de Patrimoine. She rode in the women's road race and time trial at the UCI Road World Championships in 2017, 2018 and 2020, and she competed in the 2024 Summer Olympics in Paris for the Refugee Olympic Team.

== Biography ==
Eyeru was born in Aksum and is Tigrayan. She grew up an only child with her mother. She heard about Hanet Asmelash, the wife of racing cyclist Tsgabu Grmay, and wanted to try racing herself, but she was initially unable to afford a bicycle. When she was 16, she started helping her mother sell fruit and homemade snacks, and she used her earnings to rent a bicycle for short periods of time, "10 or 20 minutes", and learned how to ride.

After six months of practice, she joined the local Ketema Axum Cycling Club. The following year, she relocated to Tigray's cycling capital Mekelle, where she was selected for the Messebo Sement Factory Cycling Club's women's team. She began to be selected for international competitions in 2015.

In 2017, she was invited to train at the UCI World Cycling Center in Switzerland. She raced in the Tour Cycliste Féminin International de l'Ardèche, which she described "the hardest race I'd ever done" as the distances were much longer than what she was used to. She also ran into cultural and language barriers that made it difficult for her to socialize with the other cyclists.

Between 2018 and 2020, she often went to Europe to race. However, the Tigray War broke out in October 2020. Eyeru was separated from her mother, and some of her friends and family were killed. When a route was opened up between Mekelle and Addis Abbaba in 2021, Eyeru fled. She asked the Ethiopian Cycling Federation to enter her in the 2021 World Championships; they initially refused to help her obtain a visa because she was from Tigray, but after two months, they gave in to her request. Friends from outside the country attempted to contact her, though without internet, she had no way to see their messages for months.

She arrived in France in August 2021 ahead of the World Championships in Belgium, but she did not show up in protest as "I did not want to represent my country because it would have been supporting the genocide of my people". She instead went to an undisclosed country before she returned to France. She was granted asylum in July 2022, and has since lived in Nice and near Nancy.

Eyeru began learning French and started cycling again, describing it as "like my therapy" as it helped her deal with the difficult situation and news from Ethiopia. The Tigray War ended in late 2022, and she was able to speak regularly with her mother again.

In 2023, she competed a full season, including racing in the Tour de Suisse. She received an International Olympic Committee scholarship in December. In 2024, she was selected to be a torchbearer for the 2024 Summer Olympics. Later in the year, she competed there in the women's individual road race as a member of the Refugee Olympic Team. She missed a time cutoff and did not finish the race.

As of 2025, she rides for Team Buffaz Gestion de Patrimoine.

== Major results ==
2015
3rd Team time trial, African Games
2016
2nd Team time trial, African Road Championships
National Road Championships

2nd Road race
2nd Time trial

2nd Road race, National Junior Road Championships
9th KZN Summer Series Race 1
2017
African Road Championships

2nd Team time trial
7th Time trial

2018
African Road Championships

1st Team time trial
3rd Time trial
4th Road race

2019
African Road Championships

1st Team time trial
2nd Time trial
2nd Road race
