= Taekwondo at the 2024 Summer Olympics =

Taekwondo at the Games of the XXXIII Olympiad
- Venue: Grand Palais
- Dates: 7–10 August 2024
- No. of events: 8 (4 men, 4 women)
- Competitors: 134 from 60 nations

The taekwondo competitions at the 2024 Summer Olympics in Paris ran from 7 to 10 August at the Grand Palais strip. 128 taekwondo fighters, with an equal distribution between men and women, competed across eight different weight categories (four per gender) at the Games, the same amount as the previous editions since Beijing 2008. Each weight category was composed of sixteen taekwondo fighters; however, this figure may increase if additional athletes are invited and selected from the Refugee Olympic Team.

== Qualification ==
The taekwondo competition for Paris will feature a total of 128 athletes (64 men and 64 women) across eight different weight categories, the same amount as the previous editions since Beijing 2008. Each National Olympic Committee (NOC) can enter a maximum of eight taekwondo fighters, with one per bodyweight category and four per gender.

The qualification window commences with the five spots awarded to the top-ranked practitioners in each of the eight weight classes (four per gender) through the World Taekwondo Federation (WTF) Olympic rankings and another spot to the highest of each weight category based on the merit points accrued in the WT Grand Slam Champions Series, scheduled for December 16–17, 2023 in Wuxi, China. At the beginning of the 2024 season, five continental qualification tournaments will offer the majority of the berths to the top two taekwondo fighters of each weight category from Africa, the Americas, Asia, and Europe; and to the highest-ranked from Oceania.

The NOC containing at least two female or male taekwondo fighters through the ranking is deemed ineligible to participate in the respective Continental Qualification Tournament unless it relinquishes the places obtained. This pathway also applies to the host nation France with its reservation of two men's and women's spots (one in each weight category). Four further quota places will be entitled to the eligible NOCs interested to have their taekwondo practitioners compete in Paris 2024 through the Tripartite Commission Invitation.

== Competition schedule ==
Legend
Q	Elimination, quarterfinals, and semifinals	F	Repechage and final medal matches

Schedule
Event↓/Date →	Wed 7		Thu 8		Fri 9		Sat 10	
Men's
Men's 58 kg	Q	F						
Men's 68 kg			Q	F				
Men's 80 kg					Q	F		
Men's +80 kg							Q	F
Women's
Women's 49 kg	Q	F						
Women's 57 kg			Q	F				
Women's 67 kg					Q	F		
Women's +67 kg							Q	F

== Medal summary ==
A total of 32 medals were won by 23 NOCs.

=== Medal table ===
* Host nation (France)

Rank	NOC	Gold	Silver	Bronze	Total
1	South Korea	2	0	1	3
2	Iran	1	2	1	4
3	Uzbekistan	1	1	0	2
4	France*	1	0	1	2
4	Tunisia	1	0	1	2
6	Hungary	1	0	0	1
6	Thailand	1	0	0	1
8	China	0	1	1	2
9	Azerbaijan	0	1	0	1
9	Great Britain	0	1	0	1
9	Jordan	0	1	0	1
9	Serbia	0	1	0	1
13	Belgium	0	0	1	1
13	Brazil	0	0	1	1
13	Bulgaria	0	0	1	1
13	Canada	0	0	1	1
13	Croatia	0	0	1	1
13	Cuba	0	0	1	1
13	Denmark	0	0	1	1
13	Italy	0	0	1	1
13	Ivory Coast	0	0	1	1
13	Turkey	0	0	1	1
13	United States	0	0	1	1
Totals (23 entries)		8	8	16	32

=== Men's events ===
Event	Gold	Silver	Bronze
58 kg	Park Tae-joon; South Korea	Gashim Magomedov; Azerbaijan	Cyrian Ravet; France
58 kg	Park Tae-joon; South Korea	Gashim Magomedov; Azerbaijan	Mohamed Khalil Jendoubi; Tunisia
68 kg	Ulugbek Rashitov; Uzbekistan	Zaid Kareem; Jordan	Liang Yushuai; China
68 kg	Ulugbek Rashitov; Uzbekistan	Zaid Kareem; Jordan	Edival Pontes; Brazil
80 kg	Firas Katoussi; Tunisia	Mehran Barkhordari; Iran	Simone Alessio; Italy
80 kg	Firas Katoussi; Tunisia	Mehran Barkhordari; Iran	Edi Hrnic; Denmark
+80 kg	Arian Salimi; Iran	Caden Cunningham; Great Britain	Rafael Alba; Cuba
+80 kg	Arian Salimi; Iran	Caden Cunningham; Great Britain	Cheick Sallah Cissé; Ivory Coast

=== Women's events ===
Event	Gold	Silver	Bronze
49 kg	Panipak Wongpattanakit; Thailand	Guo Qing; China	Mobina Nematzadeh; Iran
49 kg	Panipak Wongpattanakit; Thailand	Guo Qing; China	Lena Stojković; Croatia
57 kg	Kim Yu-jin; South Korea	Nahid Kiani; Iran	Skylar Park; Canada
57 kg	Kim Yu-jin; South Korea	Nahid Kiani; Iran	Kimia Alizadeh; Bulgaria
67 kg	Viviana Márton; Hungary	Aleksandra Perišić; Serbia	Kristina Teachout; United States
67 kg	Viviana Márton; Hungary	Aleksandra Perišić; Serbia	Sarah Chaâri; Belgium
+67 kg	Althéa Laurin; France	Svetlana Osipova; Uzbekistan	Lee Da-bin; South Korea
+67 kg	Althéa Laurin; France	Svetlana Osipova; Uzbekistan	Nafia Kuş; Turkey

== Participating nations ==
There were 60 participating nations:

- Argentina (1)
- Australia (3)
- Austria (1)
- Azerbaijan (1)
- Belgium (1)
- Brazil (4)
- Bulgaria (1)
- Burkina Faso (2)
- Canada (2)
- Chile (2)
- China (6)
- Chinese Taipei (1)
- Croatia (3)
- Cuba (2)
- Czech Republic (2)
- Denmark (1)
- Dominican Republic (1)
- Timor-Leste (1)
- Egypt (3)
- Fiji (2)
- France (4)
- Gabon (1)
- The Gambia (1)
- Germany (1)
- Great Britain (4)
- Guinea-Bissau (1)
- Hong Kong (1)
- Hungary (3)
- Individual Neutral Athletes (1)
- Ireland (1)
- Iran (4)
- Israel (1)
- Italy (3)
- Ivory Coast (3)
- Jordan (4)
- Kazakhstan (2)
- Lebanon (1)
- Lesotho (1)
- Mali (1)
- Mexico (2)
- Morocco (2)
- Niger (2)
- Nigeria (1)
- North Macedonia (1)
- Norway (1)
- Papua New Guinea (2)
- Palestine (1)
- Refugee Olympic Team (5)
- Saudi Arabia (1)
- Senegal (1)
- Serbia (3)
- Slovenia (1)
- South Korea (4)
- Spain (4)
- Tajikistan (1)
- Thailand (3)
- Tunisia (4)
- Turkey (5)
- United States (4)
- Uruguay (1)
- Uzbekistan (5)
- Venezuela (1)

== See also ==
- Taekwondo at the 2024 Summer Paralympics
