= Croatia at the 2024 Summer Olympics =

- IOC code: CRO
- NOC: Croatian Olympic Committee
- Website: www.hoo.hr (in Croatian and English)

in Paris, France 26 July 2024 – 11 August 2024
- Competitors: 73 (58 men and 15 women) in 15 sports
- Flag bearers (opening): Giovanni Cernogoraz & Barbara Matić
- Flag bearers (closing): Ivan Šapina & Lena Stojković
- Medals Ranked 30th: Gold 2 Silver 2 Bronze 3 Total 7

Summer Olympics appearances (overview)
- 1992; 1996; 2000; 2004; 2008; 2012; 2016; 2020; 2024; 2028

Other related appearances
- Austria (1900); Yugoslavia (1920–1988)

Croatia competed at the 2024 Summer Olympics in Paris from 26 July to 11 August 2024. It was the nation's ninth consecutive appearance at the Summer Olympics as an independent nation.

Croatia is represented by 73 competitors (58 male and 15 female) in 15 sports, with a total delegation of 157 people.

Croatia concluded the Summer Olympics with two golds, two silvers and three broze medals.

== Medalists ==
| Medal | Name | Sport | Event | Date |
|---|---|---|---|---|
| Gold | Barbara Matić | Judo | Women's 70 kg | 31 July |
| Gold | Valent Sinković; Martin Sinković | Rowing | Men's coxless pair | 2 August |
| Silver | Donna Vekić | Tennis | Women's singles | 3 August |
| Silver | Croatia men's national water polo team: Marko Bijač; Rino Burić; Loren Fatović; Luka Lončar; Maro Joković; Luka Bukić; Ante Vukičević; Marko Žuvela; Jerko Marinić Kragić; Josip Vrlić; Matias Biljaka; Konstantin Kharkov; Toni Popadić | Water polo | Men's tournament | 11 August |
| Bronze | Miran Maričić | Shooting | Men's 10 m air rifle | 29 July |
| Bronze | Sandra Elkasević | Athletics | Women's discus throw | 5 August |
| Bronze | Lena Stojković | Taekwondo | Women's 49 kg | 7 August |

Medals by sport
| Sport | 1st place, gold medalist(s) | 2nd place, silver medalist(s) | 3rd place, bronze medalist(s) | Total |
| Judo | 1 | 0 | 0 | 1 |
| Shooting | 0 | 0 | 1 | 1 |
| Rowing | 1 | 0 | 0 | 1 |
| Tennis | 0 | 1 | 0 | 1 |
| Water polo | 0 | 1 | 0 | 1 |
| Athletics | 0 | 0 | 1 | 1 |
| Taekwondo | 0 | 0 | 1 | 1 |
| Total | 2 | 2 | 3 | 7 |

Medals by gender
| Gender | 1st place, gold medalist(s) | 2nd place, silver medalist(s) | 3rd place, bronze medalist(s) | Total |
| Male | 1 | 1 | 1 | 3 |
| Female | 1 | 1 | 2 | 4 |
| Total | 2 | 2 | 3 | 7 |

Medals by date
| Date | 1st place, gold medalist(s) | 2nd place, silver medalist(s) | 3rd place, bronze medalist(s) | Total |
| 29 July | 0 | 0 | 1 | 1 |
| 31 July | 1 | 0 | 0 | 1 |
| 2 August | 1 | 0 | 0 | 1 |
| 3 August | 0 | 1 | 0 | 1 |
| 5 August | 0 | 0 | 1 | 1 |
| 7 August | 0 | 0 | 1 | 1 |
| 11 August | 0 | 1 | 0 | 1 |
| Total | 2 | 2 | 3 | 7 |

== Competitors ==
The following is the list of number of competitors in the Games.

| Sport | Men | Women | Total |
|---|---|---|---|
| Athletics | 4 | 5 | 9 |
| Boxing | 1 | 0 | 1 |
| Canoeing | 1 | 1 | 2 |
| Cycling | 1 | 0 | 1 |
| Gymnastics | 2 | 0 | 2 |
| Handball | 14 | 0 | 14 |
| Judo | 1 | 2 | 3 |
| Rowing | 5 | 0 | 5 |
| Sailing | 4 | 2 | 6 |
| Shooting | 3 | 0 | 3 |
| Swimming | 2 | 1 | 3 |
| Table tennis | 3 | 1 | 4 |
| Taekwondo | 2 | 1 | 3 |
| Tennis | 2 | 2 | 4 |
| Water polo | 13 | 0 | 13 |
| Total | 58 | 15 | 73 |

== Athletics ==
Croatian track and field athletes achieved the entry standards for Paris 2024, either by passing the direct qualifying mark (or time for track and road races) or by world ranking, in the following events (a maximum of 3 athletes each):

Key

- Note–Ranks given for track events are within the athlete's heat only
- Q = Qualified for the next round
- q = Qualified for the next round as a fastest loser or, in field events, by position without achieving the qualifying target
- NR = National record
- N/A = Round not applicable for the event
- Bye = Athlete not required to compete in round

Track and road events

| Athlete | Event | Final | |
| Athlete | Event | Result | Rank |
|---|---|---|---|
| Bojana Bjeljac | Women's marathon | 2:41:13 | 71 |
| Matea Parlov Koštro | Women's marathon | DNF | |

Field events

| Athlete | Event | Qualification | | Final | |
| Athlete | Event | Result | Rank | Result | Rank |
|---|---|---|---|---|---|
| Filip Pravdica | Men's long jump | 8.04 | 5 Q | 7.90 | 9 |
| Filip Mihaljević | Men's shot put | 20.75 | 14 | Did not advance | |
| Martin Marković | Men's discus throw | 62.31 | 16 | Did not advance | |
| Matija Gregurić | Men's hammer throw | 73.69 | 17 | Did not advance | |
| Sandra Elkasević | Women's discus throw | 65.63 | 2 Q | 67.51 | 3rd place, bronze medalist(s) |
| Marija Tolj | Women's discus throw | 59.87 | 23 | Did not advance | |
| Sara Kolak | Women's javelin throw | 64.57 | 2 Q | 63.40 | 4 |

== Boxing ==
Croatia entered one boxer into the Olympic tournament. Gabrijel Veočić scored an outright quarterfinal victory to secure a spot in the men's middleweight division at the 2023 European Games in Nowy Targ, Poland.

| Athlete | Event | Round of 32 | Round of 16 | Quarterfinals | Semifinals | Final | |
| Athlete | Event | Opposition Result | Opposition Result | Opposition Result | Opposition Result | Opposition Result | Rank |
|---|---|---|---|---|---|---|---|
| Gabrijel Veočić | Men's 80 kg | Bye | Ishaish (JOR); W 5–0 | Pinales (DOM); L 0–5 | Did not advance | | |

== Canoeing ==
=== Slalom ===
Croatia entered one single boat into the slalom competition, for the Games through the 2023 ICF Canoe Slalom World Championships in London, Great Britain.

| Athlete | Event | Preliminary | | | | | | Semifinal | | Final | |
| Athlete | Event | Run 1 | Rank | Run 2 | Rank | Best | Rank | Time | Rank | Time | Rank |
|---|---|---|---|---|---|---|---|---|---|---|---|
| Matija Marinić | Men's C-1 | 91.61 | 3 | 98.44 | 9 | 91.61 | 3 Q | 98.82 | 7 Q | 100.35 | 8 |

Kayak cross

| Athlete | Event | Time trial | Rank | Round 1 | Repechage | Heat | Quarterfinal | Semifinal | Final | |
| Athlete | Event | Time trial | Rank | Position | Position | Position | Position | Position | Position | Rank |
|---|---|---|---|---|---|---|---|---|---|---|
| Matija Marinić | Men's KX-1 | 74.80 | 27 | 3 R | 2 Q | 4 | Did not advance | | | 32 |

=== Sprint ===
Croatian canoeists qualified one boats in the following distances for the Games through the 2023 ICF Canoe Sprint World Championships in Duisburg, Germany.

| Athlete | Event | Heats | | Quarterfinals | | Semifinals | | Final | |
| Athlete | Event | Time | Rank | Time | Rank | Time | Rank | Time | Rank |
|---|---|---|---|---|---|---|---|---|---|
| Anamaria Govorčinović | Women's K-1 500 m | 1:55.51 | 4 QF | 1:52.92 | 4 SF | 1.53:13 | 7 | Did not advance | |

Qualification Legend: FA = Qualify to final (medal); FB = Qualify to final B (non-medal)

== Cycling ==
=== BMX ===
Croatia entered one BMX rider to compete in the men's freestyle, by finishing in the top six at the 2024 Olympic Qualifier Series.

| Athlete | Event | Seeding | | Final | |
| Athlete | Event | Score | Rank | Score | Rank |
|---|---|---|---|---|---|
| Marin Ranteš | Men's freestyle | 76.29 | 11 | Did not advance | |

== Gymnastics ==
=== Artistic ===
Croatia entered two male gymnasts into the Games. Tin Srbić directly secured his quota to compete at the Olympics by being the highest-ranked eligible athlete in the horizontal bar exercise at the 2023 World Championships in Antwerp, Belgium; meanwhile, Aurel Benović qualified through the final ranking of 2024 Apparatus World Cup Series.

Men

| Athlete | Event | Qualification | | | | | | | | Final | | | | | | | |
| Athlete | Event | Apparatus | | | | | | Total | Rank | Apparatus | | | | | | Total | Rank |
| Athlete | Event | F | PH | R | V | PB | HB | Total | Rank | F | PH | R | V | PB | HB | Total | Rank |
|---|---|---|---|---|---|---|---|---|---|---|---|---|---|---|---|---|---|
| Aurel Benović | Floor | 13.766 | —N/a | | | | | 13.766 | 28 | Did not advance | | | | | | | |
| Aurel Benović | Vault | —N/a | | | 14.733 | —N/a | | 14.733 | 3 Q | —N/a | | | 14.900 | —N/a | | 14.900 | 5 |
| Tin Srbić | Horizontal bar | —N/a | | | | | 14.600 | 14.600 | 4 Q | —N/a | | | | | 11.333 | 11.333 | 8 |

== Handball ==
Summary

Key:

- ET: After extra time
- P – Match decided by penalty-shootout.

| Team | Event | Group Stage | | | | | | Quarterfinal | Semifinal | Final / BM | |
| Team | Event | Opposition Score | Opposition Score | Opposition Score | Opposition Score | Opposition Score | Rank | Opposition Score | Opposition Score | Opposition Score | Rank |
|---|---|---|---|---|---|---|---|---|---|---|---|
| Croatia men's | Men's tournament | Japan; W 30–29 | Slovenia; L 29–31 | Germany; W 31–26 | Sweden; L 27–38 | Spain; L 31–32 | 5 | Did not advance | | | 9 |

=== Men's tournament ===
Croatia men's national handball team qualified for the Olympics by securing a top two spot at the 2024 IHF Men's Olympic Qualification Tournaments in Hanover, Germany.

Team roster

A 20-player roster was announced on 23 May 2024. The final squad was revealed on 7 July 2024.

Head coach: (Iceland) Dagur Sigurðsson

| No. | Pos. | Name | Date of birth (age) | Height | App. | Goals | Club |
|---|---|---|---|---|---|---|---|
| 1 | GK | Dominik Kuzmanović | 15 August 2002 (aged 21) | 1.93 m | 21 | 0 | (Germany) VfL Gummersbach |
| 2 | LW | Lovro Mihić | 25 August 1994 (age 32) | 1.81 m | 62 | 86 | (Poland) Orlen Wisła Płock |
| 5 | CB | Domagoj Duvnjak | 1 June 1988 (aged 36) | 1.98 m | 257 | 771 | (Germany) THW Kiel |
| 6 | RW | Mario Šoštarič | 25 November 1992 (aged 31) | 1.93 m | 20 | 70 | (Hungary) OTP Bank-Pick Szeged |
| 9 | RB | Luka Lovre Klarica | 25 September 2001 (aged 22) | 1.97 m | 26 | 66 | (Croatia) RK Zagreb |
| 11 | LB | Zvonimir Srna | 18 January 1998 (aged 26) | 2.02 m | 28 | 61 | (Croatia) RK Zagreb |
| 12 | GK | Matej Mandić | 2 May 2002 (aged 22) | 2.06 m | 24 | 0 | (Croatia) RK Zagreb |
| 17 | LB | Josip Šarac | 24 February 1998 (aged 26) | 2.00 m | 33 | 40 | (Germany) Frisch Auf Göppingen |
| 33 | CB | Luka Cindrić | 5 July 1993 (aged 31) | 1.82 m | 112 | 321 | (Hungary) ONE Veszprém |
| 40 | P | Nikola Grahovac | 14 December 1998 (aged 25) | 2.01 m | 15 | 8 | (Hungary) ONE Veszprém |
| 41 | LB | Tin Lučin | 16 August 1999 (aged 24) | 1.97 m | 32 | 82 | (Croatia) Nexe Našice |
| 51 | RB | Ivan Martinović | 6 January 1998 (aged 26) | 1.94 m | 44 | 197 | (Germany) Rhein Neckar-Löwen |
| 53 | P | Marin Šipić | 29 April 1996 (aged 28) | 1.90 m | 72 | 135 | (Switzerland) HC Kriens-Luzern |
| 93 | P | Veron Načinović | 7 March 2000 (aged 24) | 2.04 m | 31 | 69 | (France) Montpellier Handball |

Group play

| Pos | Team | Pld | W | D | L | GF | GA | GD | Pts | Qualification |
|---|---|---|---|---|---|---|---|---|---|---|
| 1 | Germany | 5 | 4 | 0 | 1 | 162 | 144 | +18 | 8 | Quarterfinals |
| 2 | Slovenia | 5 | 3 | 0 | 2 | 140 | 142 | −2 | 6 (Note: Slovenia 2 Pts, +2 GD; Spain 2 Pts, 0 GD; Sweden 2 Pts, −2 GD.) | Quarterfinals |
| 3 | Spain | 5 | 3 | 0 | 2 | 151 | 148 | +3 | 6 | Quarterfinals |
| 4 | Sweden | 5 | 3 | 0 | 2 | 158 | 139 | +19 | 6 | Quarterfinals |
| 5 | Croatia | 5 | 2 | 0 | 3 | 148 | 156 | −8 | 4 | |
| 6 | Japan | 5 | 0 | 0 | 5 | 143 | 173 | −30 | 0 | |

Source: Olympics Paris 2024 rankings
Rules for classification: 1) Points; 2) Head-to-head points; 3) Head-to-head goal difference; 4) Head-to-head goals scored; 5) Goal difference; 6) Goals scored; 7) Draw.
Notes:

| 27 July 2024; 14:00 | Croatia | 30–29 | Japan | Paris Expo Porte de Versailles, Paris; Attendance: 5,749; Referees: Jørum, Kleven (NOR) |
| 27 July 2024; 14:00 | Šoštarič 6 | (13–18) | Yasuhira 10 | Paris Expo Porte de Versailles, Paris; Attendance: 5,749; Referees: Jørum, Kleven (NOR) |
| 27 July 2024; 14:00 | 3× (suspension) | Report | 4× (suspension) | Paris Expo Porte de Versailles, Paris; Attendance: 5,749; Referees: Jørum, Kleven (NOR) |

| 29 July 2024; 11:00 | Slovenia | 31–29 | Croatia | Paris Expo Porte de Versailles, Paris; Attendance: 5,788; Referees: Nachevski, Nikolov (MKD) |
| 29 July 2024; 11:00 | Janc, Vlah 8 | (13–13) | three players 5 | Paris Expo Porte de Versailles, Paris; Attendance: 5,788; Referees: Nachevski, Nikolov (MKD) |
| 29 July 2024; 11:00 | 1× (yellow card) 5× (suspension) | Report | 1× (yellow card) 8× (suspension) 1× (red card) | Paris Expo Porte de Versailles, Paris; Attendance: 5,788; Referees: Nachevski, Nikolov (MKD) |

| 31 July 2024; 11:00 | Croatia | 31–26 | Germany | Paris Expo Porte de Versailles, Paris; Attendance: 5,774; Referees: Horáček, Novotný (CZE) |
| 31 July 2024; 11:00 | Martinović 9 | (15–13) | Golla 8 | Paris Expo Porte de Versailles, Paris; Attendance: 5,774; Referees: Horáček, Novotný (CZE) |
| 31 July 2024; 11:00 | 1× (yellow card) 5× (suspension) 1× (red card) | Report | | Paris Expo Porte de Versailles, Paris; Attendance: 5,774; Referees: Horáček, Novotný (CZE) |

| 2 August 2024; 14:00 | Croatia | 27–38 | Sweden | Paris Expo Porte de Versailles, Paris; Attendance: 5,774; Referees: C. Bonaventura, J. Bonaventura (FRA) |
| 2 August 2024; 14:00 | Martinović 8 | (15–18) | Pellas 9 | Paris Expo Porte de Versailles, Paris; Attendance: 5,774; Referees: C. Bonaventura, J. Bonaventura (FRA) |
| 2 August 2024; 14:00 | 1× (yellow card) 4× (suspension) | Report | 3× (suspension) | Paris Expo Porte de Versailles, Paris; Attendance: 5,774; Referees: C. Bonaventura, J. Bonaventura (FRA) |

| 4 August 2024; 21:00 | Spain | 32–31 | Croatia | Paris Expo Porte de Versailles, Paris; Attendance: 5,723; Referees: Horáček, Novotný (CZE) |
| 4 August 2024; 21:00 | Rodríguez 6 | (20–15) | Klarica 7 | Paris Expo Porte de Versailles, Paris; Attendance: 5,723; Referees: Horáček, Novotný (CZE) |
| 4 August 2024; 21:00 | 2× (suspension) | Report | 1× (yellow card) 6× (suspension) | Paris Expo Porte de Versailles, Paris; Attendance: 5,723; Referees: Horáček, Novotný (CZE) |

== Judo ==
Croatia qualified three judokas for the following weight classes at the Games. Zlatko Kumrić (men's heavyweight, 100 kg), Katarina Krišto (women's half-middleweight, 63 kg) and Barbara Matić (women's middleweight, 70 kg) got qualified via quota based on IJF World Ranking List and continental quota based on Olympic point rankings.

| Athlete | Event | Round of 32 | Round of 16 | Quarterfinals | Semifinals | Repechage | Final / BM | |
| Athlete | Event | Opposition Result | Opposition Result | Opposition Result | Opposition Result | Opposition Result | Opposition Result | Rank |
|---|---|---|---|---|---|---|---|---|
| Zlatko Kumrić | Men's –100 kg | Pirelli (ITA); L 00–10 | Did not advance | | | | | |
| Katarina Krišto | Women's –63 kg | Guimendego (CAF); W 10–00 | Takaichi (JPN); W 01–00 | Kim (KOR); W 10–00 | Awiti Alcaraz (MEX); L 00–11 | Bye | Fazliu (KOS); L 00–10 | 5 |
| Barbara Matić | Women's –70 kg | Bye | Polling (ITA); W 10–00 | Tsunoda (ESP); W 10–00 | van Dijke (NED); W 10–00 | Bye | Butkereit (GER); W 01–00 | 1st place, gold medalist(s) |

== Rowing ==
Croatian rowers qualified boats in each of the following classes through the 2023 World Rowing Championships in Belgrade, Serbia.

| Athlete | Event | Heats | | Repechage | | Quarterfinals | | Semifinals | | Final | |
| Athlete | Event | Time | Rank | Time | Rank | Time | Rank | Time | Rank | Time | Rank |
|---|---|---|---|---|---|---|---|---|---|---|---|
| Damir Martin | Men's single sculls | 6:54.83 | 2 QF | Bye | | 6:53.55 | 2 SA/B | 6:58.23 | 6 FB | 6:57.77 | 11 |
| Valent Sinković; Martin Sinković | Men's coxless pair | 6:35.28 | 1 SA/B | Bye | | —N/a | | 6:29.98 | 1 FA | 6:23.66 | 1st place, gold medalist(s) |
| Anton Lončarić; Patrik Lončarić | Men's double sculls | 6:24.62 | 3 SA/B | Bye | | —N/a | | 6:49.51 | 6 FB | 6:26.04 | 12 |

Qualification Legend: FA=Final A (medal); FB=Final B (non-medal); FC=Final C (non-medal); FD=Final D (non-medal); FE=Final E (non-medal); FF=Final F (non-medal); SA/B=Semifinals A/B; SC/D=Semifinals C/D; SE/F=Semifinals E/F; QF=Quarterfinals; R=Repechage

== Sailing ==
Croatian sailors qualified one boat in each of the following classes through the 2023 Sailing World Championships in The Hague, Netherlands; and 2024 ILCA European Championships in Athens, Greece.

Elimination events

| Athlete | Event | Opening Series | | | | | | | | | | | | | | | | | | | | | | Final Series | | | | | | | | | | | | | Final rank |
| Athlete | Event | 1 | 2 | 3 | 4 | 5 | 6 | 7 | 8 | 9 | 10 | 11 | 12 | 13 | 14 | 15 | 16 | 17 | 18 | 19 | 20 | Net Points | Rank | QF | SF1 | SF2 | SF3 | SF4 | SF5 | SF6 | F1 | F2 | F3 | F4 | F5 | F6 | Final rank |
|---|---|---|---|---|---|---|---|---|---|---|---|---|---|---|---|---|---|---|---|---|---|---|---|---|---|---|---|---|---|---|---|---|---|---|---|---|---|
| Palma Čargo | Women's IQFoil | 17 | 14 | 3 | 4 | 13 | 8 | 15 | 9 | 19 | 9 | 9 | ~~UFD~~; ~~(25)~~ | ~~DNF~~; ~~(25)~~ | 1 | Cancelled | | | | | | 121 | 12 | Did not advance | | | | | | | | | | | | | 12 |
| Martin Dolenc | Men's Formula Kite | ~~14~~ | 14 | ~~18~~ | 13 | 13 | 5 | 8 | Cancelled | | | | | | | | | —N/a | | | | 53 | 14 | —N/a | Did not advance | | | | | | | | | | | | 14 |

Medal race events

| Athlete | Event | Race | | | | | | | | | | | | | Net points | Final rank |
| Athlete | Event | 1 | 2 | 3 | 4 | 5 | 6 | 7 | 8 | 9 | 10 | 11 | 12 | M* | Net points | Final rank |
|---|---|---|---|---|---|---|---|---|---|---|---|---|---|---|---|---|
| Filip Jurišić | Men's ILCA 7 | 13 | 4 | ~~32~~ | 1 | 31 | 24 | 28 | 14 | Cancelled | | —N/a | | EL | 115 | 19 |
| Šime Fantela; Mihovil Fantela | Men's 49er | 12 | ~~15~~ | 12 | 13 | 4 | 6 | 2 | 15 | 8 | 10 | 2 | 1 | OCS (22) | 107 | 9 |
| Elena Vorobeva | Women's ILCA 6 | 5 | 18 | ~~40~~ | 16 | 3 | 12 | 4 | 13 | 8 | Cancelled | —N/a | | 18 | 97 | 6 |

M = Medal race; EL = Eliminated – did not advance into the medal race

== Shooting ==
Croatian shooters achieved quota places for the following events based on their results at the 2022 and 2023 ISSF World Championships, 2022, 2023, and 2024 European Championships, 2023 European Games, and 2024 ISSF World Olympic Qualification Tournament.

| Athlete | Event | Qualification | | Final | |
| Athlete | Event | Points | Rank | Points | Rank |
|---|---|---|---|---|---|
| Petar Gorša | Men's 50 m rifle 3 positions | 583 | 31 | Did not advance | |
| Petar Gorša | Men's 10 m air rifle | 629.8 | 8 Q | 165.6 | 6 |
| Miran Maričić | Men's 50 m rifle 3 positions | 585 | 26 | Did not advance | |
| Miran Maričić | Men's 10 m air rifle | 631.3 | 4 Q | 230.0 | 3rd place, bronze medalist(s) |
| Giovanni Cernogoraz | Men's trap | 122 | 7 | Did not advance | |

== Swimming ==
Croatian swimmers achieved the entry standards in the following events (up to a maximum of 2 swimmers in each event at the Olympic Qualifying Time (OQT), and potentially 1 at the Olympic Consideration Time (OCT):

| Athlete | Event | Heat | | Semifinal | | Final | |
| Athlete | Event | Time | Rank | Time | Rank | Time | Rank |
|---|---|---|---|---|---|---|---|
| Jere Hribar | Men's 50 m freestyle | 22.08 | 22 | Did not advance | | | |
| Nikola Miljenić | Men's 100 m freestyle | 49.34 | 33 | Did not advance | | | |
| Nikola Miljenić | Men's 100 m butterfly | 53.32 | 30 | Did not advance | | | |
| Jana Pavalić | Women's 50 m freestyle | 25.24 | 25 | Did not advance | | | |

== Table tennis ==
Croatia entered a full squad of male athletes and one female single player into the Games. Croatian men's senior team qualified by virtue of the results as the three highest team, not yet qualified, through the final ITTF teams ranking; meanwhile one women's qualified for the games through the world ranking.

| Athlete | Event | Preliminary | Round of 64 | Round of 32 | Round of 16 | Quarterfinals | Semifinals | Final / BM | |
| Athlete | Event | Opposition Result | Opposition Result | Opposition Result | Opposition Result | Opposition Result | Opposition Result | Opposition Result | Rank |
|---|---|---|---|---|---|---|---|---|---|
| Andrej Gaćina | Men's singles | Bye | O Ionescu (ROU); W 4–1 | Lin Y (TPE); L 0–4 | Did not advance | | | | |
| Tomislav Pucar | Men's singles | Bye | Bouloussa (ALG); W 4–0 | Lebrun (FRA); L 0–4 | Did not advance | | | | |
| Andrej Gaćina; Tomislav Pucar; Filip Zeljko | Men's team | —N/a | | | South Korea; L 0–3 | Did not advance | | | |
| Ivana Malobabić | Women's singles | Bye | Jian (SGP); L 3–4 | Did not advance | | | | | |

== Taekwondo ==
Croatia qualified three athlete to compete at the games. Ivan Šapina and Lena Stojković qualified for Paris 2024 by finishing within the top five in the Olympic rankings in their respective divisions. Meanwhile, the third athlete, Marko Golubić, qualified for the Games after his semifinal victory at the 2024 European Olympic Qualification Tournament in Sofia, Bulgaria.

| Athlete | Event | Round of 16 | Quarterfinals | Semifinals | Repechage | Final / BM | |
| Athlete | Event | Opposition Result | Opposition Result | Opposition Result | Opposition Result | Opposition Result | Rank |
|---|---|---|---|---|---|---|---|
| Marko Golubić | Men's −68 kg | Pié (DOM); W 2–0 | Sinden (GBR); L 1–2 | Did not advance | | | |
| Ivan Šapina | Men's +80 kg | Ann (GAM); W 2–0 | Ordemann (NOR); W 2–1 | Salimi (IRI); L 1–2 | Bye | Alba (CUB); L 0–2 | 5 |
| Lena Stojković | Women's −49 kg | Kafadar (CAN); W 2–0 | Dhahri (TUN); W 2–1 | Wongpattanakit (THA); L 0–2 | Bye | Dinçel (TUR); W 2–0 | 3rd place, bronze medalist(s) |

== Tennis ==
Croatia entered four tennis players into the Olympic tournament.

| Athlete | Event | Round of 64 | Round of 32 | Round of 16 | Quarterfinals | Semifinals | Final / BM | |
| Athlete | Event | Opposition Score | Opposition Score | Opposition Score | Opposition Score | Opposition Score | Opposition Score | Rank |
|---|---|---|---|---|---|---|---|---|
| Nikola Mektić; Mate Pavić | Men's doubles | —N/a | Koepfer / Struff (GER); L 3–6, 7–6^{(7–5)}, [5–10] | Did not advance | | | | |
| Petra Martić | Women's singles | Bucșa (ESP); L 4–6, 3–6 | Did not advance | | | | | |
| Donna Vekić | Women's singles | Bronzetti (ITA); W 6–2, 7–5 | Andreescu (CAN); W 6–3, 6–4 | Gauff (USA); W 7–6^{(9–7)}, 6–2 | Kostyuk (UKR); W 6–4, 2–6, 7–6^{(10–8)} | Schmiedlová (SVK); W 6–4, 6–0 | Zheng (CHN); L 2–6, 3–6 | 2nd place, silver medalist(s) |
| Donna Vekić; Mate Pavić | Mixed doubles | —N/a | | Xin Wang / Zhang (CHN) | Withdrew due to Vekić wanting to focus on her singles event | | | |

== Water polo ==
Summary

Key:
- FT – After full time.
- P – Match decided by penalty-shootout.

| Team | Event | Group stage | | | | | | Quarterfinal | Semifinal | Final / BM | |
| Team | Event | Opposition Score | Opposition Score | Opposition Score | Opposition Score | Opposition Score | Rank | Opposition Score | Opposition Score | Opposition Score | Rank |
|---|---|---|---|---|---|---|---|---|---|---|---|
| Croatia men's | Men's tournament | Montenegro; W 11–8 | Italy; L 11–14 | Romania; W 11–8 | Greece; W 14–13 | United States; L 11–14 | 4 Q | Spain; W 10–8 | Hungary; W 9–8 | Serbia; L 11–13 | 2nd place, silver medalist(s) |

=== Men's tournament ===
Croatia men's national water polo team qualified for the Olympics by securing an outright berth at the 2024 World Aquatics Championships.

Team roster

The roster was announced on 7 July 2024.

Head coach: Ivica Tucak

- 1 Marko Bijač (c) GK
- 2 Rino Burić CB
- 3 Loren Fatović W
- 4 Luka Lončar CF
- 5 Maro Joković W
- 6 Luka Bukić D
- 7 Ante Vukičević D
- 8 Marko Žuvela CB
- 9 Jerko Marinić Kragić D
- 10 Josip Vrlić CF
- 11 Matias Biljaka CB
- 12 Konstantin Kharkov W
- 13 Toni Popadić GK

Group play

| Pos | Team | Pld | W | PSW | PSL | L | GF | GA | GD | Pts | Qualification |
|---|---|---|---|---|---|---|---|---|---|---|---|
| 1 | Greece | 5 | 3 | 1 | 0 | 1 | 61 | 52 | +9 | 11 (Note: Greece 9–8 Italy) | Quarterfinals |
| 2 | Italy | 5 | 3 | 1 | 0 | 1 | 60 | 43 | +17 | 11 | Quarterfinals |
| 3 | United States | 5 | 3 | 0 | 0 | 2 | 59 | 51 | +8 | 9 (Note: Croatia 11–14 United States) | Quarterfinals |
| 4 | Croatia | 5 | 3 | 0 | 0 | 2 | 58 | 57 | +1 | 9 | Quarterfinals |
| 5 | Montenegro | 5 | 1 | 0 | 2 | 2 | 45 | 50 | −5 | 5 | |
| 6 | Romania | 5 | 0 | 0 | 0 | 5 | 37 | 67 | −30 | 0 | |

Source: Olympics
Rules for classification: 1) Points; 2) Head-to-head points; 3) Head-to-head goal difference; 4) Head-to-head goals scored; 5) Goal difference.
Notes:

| 28 July 2024; 16:35 v | Report | Croatia | 11–8 | Montenegro | Paris Aquatic Centre, Paris; Referees: Boris Margeta (SLO), David Gómez (ESP) |
| 28 July 2024; 16:35 v | Report | Score by quarters: 3–1, 2–4, 3–1, 3–2 | | | Paris Aquatic Centre, Paris; Referees: Boris Margeta (SLO), David Gómez (ESP) |
| 28 July 2024; 16:35 v | Report | Fatović 3 | Goals | Đurđić 3 | Paris Aquatic Centre, Paris; Referees: Boris Margeta (SLO), David Gómez (ESP) |

| 30 July 2024; 12:05 v | Report | Croatia | 11–14 | Italy | Paris Aquatic Centre, Paris; Referees: Michiel Zwart (NED), Sébastien Dervieux (FRA) |
| 30 July 2024; 12:05 v | Report | Score by quarters: 4–3, 2–3, 3–6, 2–2 | | | Paris Aquatic Centre, Paris; Referees: Michiel Zwart (NED), Sébastien Dervieux (FRA) |
| 30 July 2024; 12:05 v | Report | Fatović, Kharkov 2 | Goals | Di Fulvio 4 | Paris Aquatic Centre, Paris; Referees: Michiel Zwart (NED), Sébastien Dervieux (FRA) |

| 1 August 2024; 19:30 v | Report | Romania | 8–11 | Croatia | Paris Aquatic Centre, Paris; Referees: Tamás Kovács (HUN), Chisato Kurosaki (JPN) |
| 1 August 2024; 19:30 v | Report | Score by quarters: 0–3, 3–3, 4–5, 1–0 | | | Paris Aquatic Centre, Paris; Referees: Tamás Kovács (HUN), Chisato Kurosaki (JPN) |
| 1 August 2024; 19:30 v | Report | Fulea, Țepeluș 2 | Goals | three players 2 | Paris Aquatic Centre, Paris; Referees: Tamás Kovács (HUN), Chisato Kurosaki (JPN) |

| 3 August 2024; 12:05 v | Report | Croatia | 14–13 | Greece | Paris Aquatic Centre, Paris; Referees: Vojin Putniković (SRB), David Gómez (ESP) |
| 3 August 2024; 12:05 v | Report | Score by quarters: 3–3, 1–3, 7–3, 3–4 | | | Paris Aquatic Centre, Paris; Referees: Vojin Putniković (SRB), David Gómez (ESP) |
| 3 August 2024; 12:05 v | Report | Kharkov 4 | Goals | five players 2 | Paris Aquatic Centre, Paris; Referees: Vojin Putniković (SRB), David Gómez (ESP) |

| 5 August 2024; 18:30 v | Report | Croatia | 11–14 | United States | Paris La Défense Arena, Paris; Referees: Sébastien Dervieux (FRA), Frank Ohme (GER) |
| 5 August 2024; 18:30 v | Report | Score by quarters: 2–5, 3–5, 2–1, 4–3 | | | Paris La Défense Arena, Paris; Referees: Sébastien Dervieux (FRA), Frank Ohme (GER) |
| 5 August 2024; 18:30 v | Report | Kharkov 5 | Goals | Daube, Irving 3 | Paris La Défense Arena, Paris; Referees: Sébastien Dervieux (FRA), Frank Ohme (GER) |

Quarterfinal

| 7 August 2024; 14:00 v | Report | Croatia | 10–8 | Spain | Paris La Défense Arena, Paris; Referees: Boris Margeta (SLO), Darren Spiritosanto (USA) |
| 7 August 2024; 14:00 v | Report | Score by quarters: 2–0, 4–3, 2–2, 2–3 | | | Paris La Défense Arena, Paris; Referees: Boris Margeta (SLO), Darren Spiritosanto (USA) |
| 7 August 2024; 14:00 v | Report | three players 2 | Goals | three players 2 | Paris La Défense Arena, Paris; Referees: Boris Margeta (SLO), Darren Spiritosanto (USA) |

Semifinal

| 9 August 2024; 19:35 v | Report | Hungary | 8–9 | Croatia | Paris La Défense Arena, Paris; Referees: Frank Ohme (GER), David Gómez (ESP) |
| 9 August 2024; 19:35 v | Report | Score by quarters: 3–3, 2–4, 2–2, 1–0 | | | Paris La Défense Arena, Paris; Referees: Frank Ohme (GER), David Gómez (ESP) |
| 9 August 2024; 19:35 v | Report | Jansik, Vámos 2 | Goals | Fatović 5 | Paris La Défense Arena, Paris; Referees: Frank Ohme (GER), David Gómez (ESP) |

Final

| 11 August 2024; 14:00 v | Report | Serbia | 13–11 | Croatia | Paris La Défense Arena, Paris; Referees: Boris Margeta (SLO), Michiel Zwart (NED) |
| 11 August 2024; 14:00 v | Report | Score by quarters: 5–2, 3–3, 3–3, 2–3 | | | Paris La Défense Arena, Paris; Referees: Boris Margeta (SLO), Michiel Zwart (NED) |
| 11 August 2024; 14:00 v | Report | Ćuk 3 | Goals | Marinić Kragić 3 | Paris La Défense Arena, Paris; Referees: Boris Margeta (SLO), Michiel Zwart (NED) |

== See also ==
- Croatia at the 2024 Winter Youth Olympics
- Croatia at the 2024 Summer Paralympics
