= Taekwondo at the 2024 Summer Olympics – Men's 68 kg =

Sports event

Men's 68 kg at the Games of the XXXIII Olympiad
- Venue: Grand Palais
- Date: 8 August 2024
- Competitors: 17 from 17 nations

Medalists
1st place, gold medalist(s)		Ulugbek Rashitov	Uzbekistan
2nd place, silver medalist(s)		Zaid Kareem	Jordan
3rd place, bronze medalist(s)		Liang Yushuai	China
3rd place, bronze medalist(s)		Edival Pontes	Brazil

The men's 68 kg competition in Taekwondo at the 2024 Summer Olympics was held on 8 August 2024 at the Grand Palais.

== Summary ==
This is the seventh appearance of the men's 68 kg category, debut in 2000, and it has appeared in every games since then.

Ulugbek Rashitov defended his Tokyo 2020 title and became an eventual champion by beating Zaid Kareem, Bradly Sinden lost to potentially silver medalist Zaid Kareem, later Sinden lost to Liang Yushuai in the bronze medal match, one of the bronze medalists, Hakan Reçber lost to Kareem, later Reçber lost to potentially bronze medalist Edival Pontes in repechage, and Zhao Shuai did not qualify.

== Seeds ==
Each practitioner has every number, the hosting nation is seeded 4 based on Universality places.

1. Ulugbek Rashitov (UZB) (Champion)
2. Bradly Sinden (GBR) (loser of bronze medal matches (Walkover))
3. Hakan Reçber (TUR) (loser of repechages)
4. Souleyman Alaphilippe (FRA) (quarterfinals)
5. Javier Pérez (ESP) (loser of bronze medal matches)
6. Zaid Kareem (JOR) (silver medalist)
7. Marko Golubić (CRO) (quarterfinals)
8. Levente Józsa (HUN) (round of 16)
9. Liang Yushuai (CHN) (bronze medalist)
10. Bernardo Pié (DOM) (round of 16)
11. Edival Pontes (BRA) (bronze medalist)
12. Banlung Tubtimdang (THA) (round of 16)
13. Ahmed Nassar (EGY) (round of 16)
14. Ibrahim Maïga (BUR) (round of 16)
15. Kevin Kassman (PNG) (round of 16)
16. Yahya Al-Ghotany (EOR) (qualifying round)
17. Lo Kai Fung (HKG) (loser of repechages)

== Results ==
=== Gold medal match ===
Gold medal match
1	Ulugbek Rashitov (UZB)	6	5
6	Zaid Kareem (JOR)	4	1

=== Repechage ===
Repechage				Bronze Medal
				2	Bradly Sinden (GBR)
				9	Liang Yushuai (CHN)	w/o
9	Liang Yushuai (CHN)	5	13	9	Liang Yushuai (CHN)	w/o
17	Lo Wai Fung (HKG)	4	0

Repechage					Bronze Medal
11	Edival Pontes (BRA)	8	3	7
3	Hakan Reçber (TUR)	7	3	1
3	Hakan Reçber (TUR)	7	3	1	11	Edival Pontes (BRA)	3	4	4
					5	Javier Pérez (ESP)	3	6	3

=== Main bracket ===
==== Pool A ====
Qualification round
16	Yahya Al Ghotany (EOR)	0	4
17	Lo Wai Fung (HKG)	14	16

Round of 16
13	Ahmed Nassar (EGY)	5	2
4	Souleyman Alaphilippe (FRA)	8	3
5	Javier Pérez (ESP)	7	2
12	Banlung Tubtimdang (THA)	1	2
9	Liang Yushuai (CHN)	4	5	13
8	Levente Józsa (HUN)	7	5	0
1	Ulugbek Rashitov (UZB)	12	9
17	Lo Wai Fung (HKG)	0	2

Quarter-finals
4	Souleyman Alaphilippe (FRA)	1	5	2
5	Javier Pérez (ESP)	2	4	4
9	Liang Yushuai (CHN)	1	2
1	Ulugbek Rashitov (UZB)	2	9

Semi-finals
5	Javier Pérez (ESP)	3	3
1	Ulugbek Rashitov (UZB)	7	3

==== Pool B ====
Qualification round

Round of 16
15	Kevin Kassman (PNG)	0	3
2	Bradly Sinden (GBR)	12	15
7	Marko Golubić (CRO)	3	10
10	Bernardo Pié (DOM)	0	2
11	Edival Pontes (BRA)	2	6	3
6	Zaid Kareem (JOR)	9	5	9
3	Hakan Reçber (TUR)	11	16
Ibrahim Maïga (BUR)	4	15

Quarter-finals
2	Bradly Sinden (GBR)	8	9	18
7	Marko Golubić (CRO)	6	11	10
6	Zaid Kareem (JOR)	5	9
3	Hakan Reçber (TUR)	1	5

Semi-finals
2	Bradly Sinden (GBR)	2	2	2
6	Zaid Kareem (JOR)	1	4	10
