= Hadi Tiranvalipour =

Iranian taekwondo practitioner (born 1998)

Personal information
- Native name: هادی تیران ولی‌پور
- Born: 21 March 1998 (age 28) Karaj, Iran
- Occupation: Taekwondo practitioner

Sport
- Team: Refugee Olympic Team (2024)

Hadi Tiranvalipour (Persian: هادی تیران ولی‌پور; born 21 March 1998) is an Iranian taekwondo practitioner from Karaj. He competed with the Refugee Olympic Team at the 2024 Summer Olympics.

== Life and career ==
Tiranvalipour was born on 21 March 1998, in Iran and grew up near Karaj. He recalls watching Hadi Saei win his first Olympic gold medal in taekwondo at the 2004 Summer Olympics, telling his mother he wanted to be like Saei and participate in the Olympic Games. Tiranvalipour was a member of the Iranian national taekwondo team for eight years. He was also a television presenter, a position which he used to advocate for women's rights in Iran, which have historically been severely restricted. Tiranvalipour was forced to leave Iran in 2022 and became a refugee in Italy.

Upon his arrival as a refugee in Italy, Tiranvalipour applied for a student visa to study for a master's degree at the University of Tor Vergata. He spent his first ten days in Italy living in a forest, later spending the next several months living on couches and working as a dishwasher. After arriving in Italy, Tiranvalipour wrote an email to the Italian Taekwondo Federation asking for an opportunity to compete. After not receiving a response, he visited the federation in person, where they accepted his request. He began training with the Italian national taekwondo team at Stadio Olimpico in Rome. On 10 March 2024, Tiranvalipour failed to qualify for the taekwondo men's −58 kg category in the 2024 Summer Olympics through the European Qualification Tournament. However, on 2 May, he was announced as a member of the Refugee Olympic Team for its participation in the Olympics.
