= Mohammad Rashnonezhad =

Iranian judoka (born 1996)

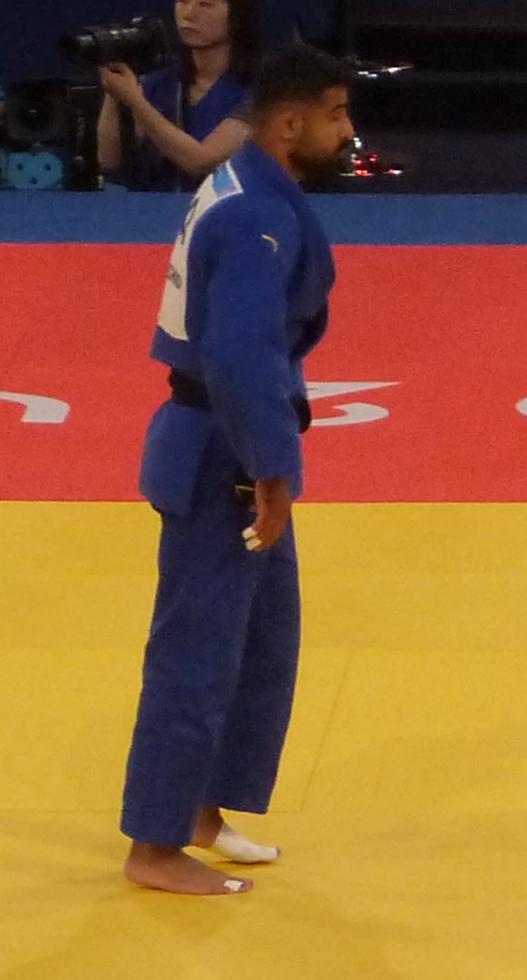

Personal information
- Born: 3 April 1996 (age 30) Andimeshk, Iran
- Occupation: Judoka

Sport
- Country: Iran
- Sport: Judo
- Weight class: ‍–‍60 kg

Achievements and titles
- Olympic Games: R32 (2024)
- World Champ.: R16 (2017, 2022)
- Asian Champ.: (silver) (2017)
Medal record
Men's judo
Representing Iran
Asian Championships
Silver medal – second place	2017 Hong Kong	‍–‍60 kg
Asian Junior Championships
Bronze medal – third place	2014 Hong Kong	‍–‍55 kg
Bronze medal – third place	2015 Bangkok	‍–‍55 kg
Asian Cadet Championships
Silver medal – second place	2010 Bangkok	‍–‍42 kg
Bronze medal – third place	2013 Hainan	‍–‍55 kg

Profile at external databases
- IJF: 13532
- JudoInside.com: 76180
- Updated on 28 July 2024

Mohammad Rashnonezhad (Persian: محمد رشنونژاد; born 3 April 1996) is an Iranian judoka who competes in the IOC Refugee team. He won a silver medal at the 2017 Asian Judo Championships in the ‍–‍60 kg category.

== Early life ==
He began judo at the age of 8 years-old. By 13 years-old, he had been invited to train with Iran's national team. He fled Iran to seek refuge in the Netherlands in 2017 after officials of the Iranian Judo Federation pressured him to avoid competing against Israelis.

== Career ==
He won the Junior Asian Championships in 2016. He finished in second place at the 2017 Asian Judo Championships in 2017.

In 2019, finished in fifth place at the Hohhot Grand Prix and won bronze at the Belgian Open Visé. Once based in the Netherlands he began to be coached by Vahid Sarlak and trained at the Olympic Training Center in Papendal.

He won a bronze medal at the European Cup in Málaga in 2019 to become the first member of the IJF refugee team to win a podium spot at an international event. He competed as part of the refugee team at the Tel Aviv Grand Prix in January 2020, posting on social media that his attendance proved "sports and politics are separate".

He competed as part of the IJF Refugee team at the European Judo Championships in Marseille in 2023. In 2023, he was awarded a scholarship by the Olympic Refuge Foundation (ORF).

In May 2024, he was confirmed on the IOC Refugee Team for the 2024 Paris Olympics.

== Personal life ==
They were one of four featured refugee athletes on a promotional video entitled Watch Where We're Going made by Nike in collaboration with the International Olympic Committee (IOC) and advertising agency Wieden+Kennedy Amsterdam designed to highlight the experiences of discrimination and prejudice faced by refugees.
