= Lo Wai Fung =

Hong Kong taekwondo practitioner

Lo Wai Fung (born 12 September 2002) is a Hong Kong taekwondo practitioner. At the 2024 Summer Olympics, Lo became the first taekwondo practitioner to represent Hong Kong since taekwondo was introduced as an Olympic event in 2000. He had initially missed qualifying for the Games after losing to Ali Reza Abbasi in the qualifying tournament in Taian, China, but gained the spot after Abbasi was disqualified. In the men's 68kg taekwondo event, Lo placed seventh after a loss to Liang Yushuai of China in the repechage. Lo was one of Hong Kong's flag bearers during the closing ceremonies.
