= Mahboubeh Barbari Zharfi =

Iranian judoka (born 1991)

Personal information
- Native name: محبوبه بربری‌ژرفی
- Born: 28 December 1991 (age 34)
- Occupation: Judoka

Sport
- Sport: Judo
- Weight class: +78 kg

Achievements and titles
- Olympic Games: R32 (2024)
- World Champ.: R64 (2023)
- European Champ.: R16 (2023)

Profile at external databases
- IJF: 70761
- JudoInside.com: 156529
- Updated on 3 August 2024

Mahboubeh Barbari Zharfi (Persian: محبوبه بربری‌ژرفی; born 28 December 1991) is an Iranian judoka. She competed at the 2024 Summer Olympics as a member of the Refugee Olympic Team in the mixed teams event and at the +78 kg category.

== Life ==
Barbari Zharfi was raised in Bandar Anzali in Iran's Gilan province. She began practicing judo at age 15, with her mother's encouragement. She later became a member of Iran's national judo team.

Barbari Zharfi sought asylum in Germany in 2018 with her daughter.

In 2023, she became the first Iranian woman to compete at the World Judo Championships without a hijab.
