= Matin Balsini =

Iranian swimmer

Matin Balsini متین بالِسینی
Personal information
- Full name: Matin Balsini
- Nationality: Iran
- Born: 19 February 2001 (age 24); Mianeh, Iran
- Height: 185 cm (6 ft 1 in)
- Weight: 75 kg (165 lb)

Sport
- Sport: Swimming
- Event: 200 butterfly
- Club: Guildford city swimming club

Matin Balesini, known as Matin Balsini (Persian: متین بالسینی; born 19 February 2001 in Tehran), is an Iranian swimmer. He competed in the 2020 Tokyo Summer Olympics. Matin is currently training with the Guildford City Swimming Club, under coach Lee Spindlow.

He was a member of the Refugee Olympic Team at the 2024 Summer Olympics in Paris.
