= Yahya Al-Ghotany =

Syrian taekwondo practitioner

Personal information
- Nationality: Syrian
- Born: 2004 (age 20–21); Syria

Sport
- Sport: Taekwondo
- Weight class: 68 kg

Yahya Al-Ghotany (Arabic: يحيى الغوطاني; born 2004) is a Syrian taekwondo practitioner. A refugee in Jordan, he was selected to compete at the 2024 Summer Olympics and was named the flag bearer for the Refugee Olympic Team.

== Biography ==
Al Ghotany was born in Syria as the first of seven children. The Syrian civil war started when he was age seven, and his family fled the country for the Azraq refugee camp in Jordan. In 2016, at age 12, he learned of taekwondo "by chance": a friend informed him of courses taught nearby by the Taekwondo Humanitarian Foundation (THF), at the Azraq Academy. His coach recalled "When Yahya started taekwondo in 2016, he was a young boy, 12 years old. He came to me and said, 'I want taekwondo'".

According to The Korea Times, "It didn't take long before Al Ghotany showed a natural ability for the sport and began aspiring for the highest levels as an athlete." Within five years, he reached a rank of black belt second-dan, which usually requires seven years of training. With the help of World Taekwondo (WT), he started participating in international tournaments. In 2023, he participated at the World Taekwondo Championships in the 63 kg category. At the Hope and Dreams Sports Festival, organized by the THF and WT in 2024, Al Ghotany qualified for the 2024 Summer Olympics as a member of the Refugee Olympic Team (EOR), to compete in the 68 kg category. In preparation for the Olympics, Al Ghotany trained with the Jordanian national taekwondo team under coach Faris Al Assaf, who helped Ahmad Abughaush win Jordan's first Olympic medal in 2016 with a gold in taekwondo. He was later selected the co-flag bearer for the EOR at the opening Olympic ceremony alongside boxer Cindy Ngamba; at age 19, he became one of the youngest Olympic flag bearers in history.
