= Omid Ahmadisafa =

Iranian kickboxer (born 1992)

- Born: Omid Ahmadisafa; September 24, 1992 (age 34); Karaj, Iran
- Native name: امید احمدی‌صفا
- Nationality: Iranian
- Height: 170 cm (5 ft 7 in)
- Weight: 147 lb (67 kg; 10 st 7 lb)
- Division: Welterweight
- Style: Boxing
- Fighting out of: Karaj, Iran
- Years active: 2016-present

Kickboxing record
- Total: 22
- Wins: 20
- By knockout: 18
- Losses: 2
- By knockout: 1

Omid Ahmadisafa (born 24 September 1992) is an Iranian martial artist and boxer. He is a former member of Iran's national boxing and kickboxing teams and has won medals in both sports. After leaving Iran, his asylum in Germany was reported by media outlets on November 5, 2021. As a member of the Refugee Olympic Team, he competed in boxing at the 2024 Summer Olympics in Paris. He currently trains in boxing with the support of the International Olympic Committee (IOC) Refugee Athlete Scholarship programme.

== Biography ==
Omid Ahmadi Safa was born in 1992 in Tehran. He is a martial artist and a former member of Iran's national boxing and kickboxing teams, who has won medals in boxing and kickboxing. He was forced to leave Iran, and his asylum in Germany was published in the media on November 5, 2021. As part of the Refugee Olympic Team, he competed in boxing at the 2024 Olympic Games in Paris. Now, thanks to the International Olympic Committee (IOC) Refugee Athlete Scholarship, he is training in boxing with the German National Team.

== Championships and awards ==
- WAKO World Championship
  - (gold) 2017 WAKO World Muay Thai Championship
  - (gold) 2015 WAKO Asian Championship
  - (silver) 2020 World Muay Thai Championship

== See also ==
- List of WBC Muaythai world champions
- List of Muay Thai practitioners
- List of male kickboxers
