= Alasan Ann =

American-Gambian taekwondo athlete (born 2000)

Personal information
- Nationality: American-Gambian
- Born: September 29, 2000 (age 25) Maple Grove, Minnesota, U.S.
- Height: 6 ft 0 in (183 cm)

Sport
- Country: Gambia
- Sport: Taekwondo
- Weight class: Heavyweight
Medal record
Men's taekwondo
Representing Gambia
African Championships
| Bronze medal – third place | 2022 Kigali | +87 kg |

Alasan Ann (born September 29, 2000) is an American-Gambian taekwondo practitioner. He qualified to represent The Gambia at the 2024 Summer Olympics.

== Biography ==
Ann was born on September 29, 2000, in Maple Grove, Minnesota, where he grew up. His father is from The Gambia and his mother from Liberia, having met him when he was part of an international force fighting the First Liberian Civil War. After his parents separated, Ann lived two years in Gambia with his father before returning to Minnesota. He first played football before being enrolled in taekwondo classes when he was age six. He started training with Grandmaster Eui Lee at Maple Grove's World Taekwondo Academy when he was age seven. As a youth, he was selected several times for the U.S. national team in his age group, including winning the Pan American junior championship in 2016. He also won gold at the 2016 US Open, bronze at the 2016 Mexico Open, gold at the 2017 US Open and bronze at the 2017 Pan American Championships in the 78 kg youth category.

Ann graduated from Maple Grove Senior High School. He began competing in senior tournaments in 2018, winning bronze at that year's Mexico Open, Pan Am Open, Costa Rica Open and Canada Open competitions. He won bronze at the 2019 US Open, Dominican Republic Open and WT Presidents Cup, and silver at the 2019 Canada Open in the 87 kg category. In 2020, he won bronze at the Costa Rica Open and won the US Open tournament.

In 2021, Ann, who had dual citizenship, switched from representing the U.S. internationally to The Gambia. He competed at his first competitions for the Gambia in 2022, earning a bronze medal at that year's African Taekwondo Championships. He also won silver at the 2022 Puerto Rico Open and the Rio Open and was the bronze medalist at the Polish Open. He won the Costa Rica Open in 2023. Ann opened a taekwondo school in Andover, Minnesota, in 2024.

Four months before the 2024 Olympic Qualification Tournament, Ann was shot in his right leg by a stray bullet in Saint Paul. He underwent a successful surgery and recovered in time for the tournament. There, he reached the finals and defeated Olympic medalist Anthony Obame to qualify for the 2024 Summer Olympics. He became the first Gambian to ever qualify for the Olympics in taekwondo. He lost in the opening match to Ivan Sapina.
