= Kasra Mehdipournejad =

Iranian Taekwondo practitioner (born 1992)

Personal information
- Native name: کسری مهدی پورنژاد
- Nationality: Iranian
- Born: 26 December 1992 (age 33) Isfahan, Iran
- Occupation: Taekwondo Practitioner
- Height: 1.91 m (6 ft 3 in)
- Weight: 80 kg (176 lb)

Sport
- Country: Iran (until 2017)
- Sport: Taekwondo
- Event: Heavyweight ( –80 kg)
Medal record
Representing International Olympic Committee
Men's taekwondo
Open Tournaments
Gold medal – first place	2019 Poland	-74 kg
Silver medal – second place	2019 Austria	-74 kg
Gold medal – first place	2018 Netherland	-74 kg
Gold medal – first place	2018 Belgium	-74 kg
Silver medal – second place	2018 Austria	-74 kg
Silver medal – second place	2018 Germany	-74 kg
Bronze medal – third place	2018 Luxembourg	-74 kg
Gold medal – first place	2022 Luxembourg	-80 kg
Bronze medal – third place	2022 Estonia	-80 kg
Gold medal – first place	2022 Solidarity Open	-80

Kasra Mehdipournejad (Persian: کسری مهدی‌پورنژاد, born on 26 December 1992 in Isfahan, Iran) is an Iranian taekwondo practitioner who lives in Berlin, Germany. Kasra is a part of Refugee Olympic Team at the 2024 Summer Olympics.

== Early life ==
He started taekwondo at the age of 10 and became the champion of Iran several times and was invited to taekwondo national team of Iran. He won the Iranian Taekwondo Super League twice with Azad university team. He left Iran in 2017 and applied for asylum in Germany. His first international competition was Deutsch Open and he won a gold medal in -74 kg category (after 6 fights) and 10 points for the Olympic rankings.

In 2019, he participated in World Taekwondo Championships in Manchester as a refugee athlete and succeeded to hold scholarship of International Olympic committee refugee team for Tokyo Olympic Games.

He participated in European qualification for Tokyo Olympic Games.

== Personal life ==
On 8 January 2026, during the 2025–2026 Iranian protests, Mehdipournejad publicly opposed the Iranian government's internet blackouts in an attempt to quell the protests, and called for international forums to engage in dialogue with Reza Pahlavi, Crown Prince of Iran.

== Medal records ==
- 2019
  - Gold: Polish Open Warsaw Cup
  - Silver: Austrian Open
- 2018
  - Gold: Dutch Open Taekwondo Championships
  - Gold: Belgian Open 2018 (Kyorugi Divisions)
  - Silver: German Open
  - Silver: Austrian Open
  - Bronze: Luxembourg Open (LuxOpen)
