= Dina Pouryounes =

Iranian Taekwondo athlete

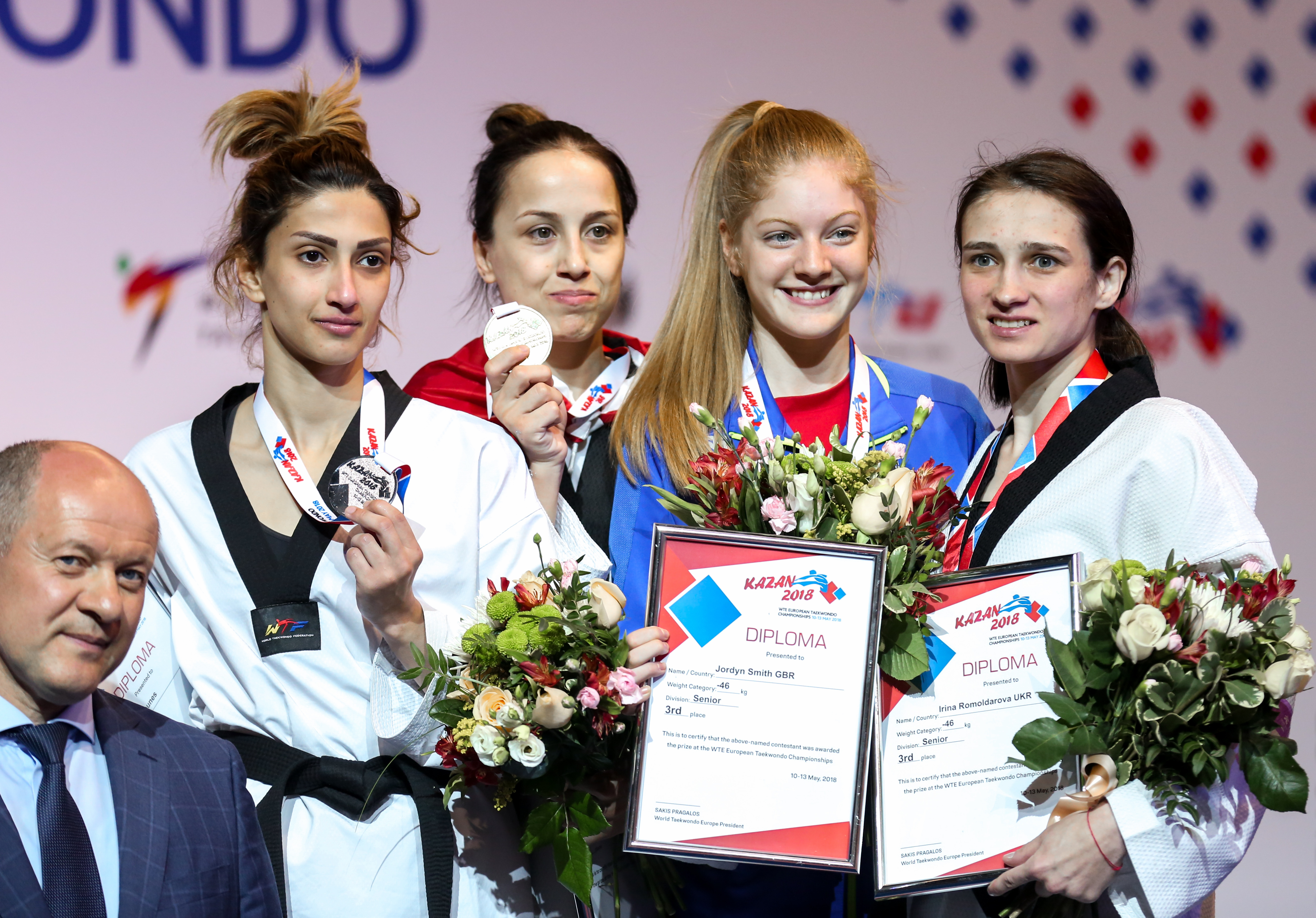
- Pouryounes at the 2018 European Championships

Personal information
- Native name: دینا پوریونس
- Born: 1 January 1992 (age 34) Langarud, Iran

Sport
- Country: Netherlands
- Sport: Taekwondo
Medal record
Representing Netherlands
Women's taekwondo
European Championships
Silver medal – second place	2018 Kazan	46 kg
Representing Iran
Women's taekwondo
Asian Championships
Bronze medal – third place	2012 Ho Chi Minh City	46 kg

Dina Pouryounes Langeroudi (Persian: دینا پوریونس لنگرودی; born 1 January 1992) is a taekwondo athlete from Iran, who lives in the Netherlands and competes for the IOC Refugee Team. She participated in the 2020 Tokyo Olympics and 2024 Paris Olympics.

== Career ==
Pouryounes competed in her first major international event as a senior at the Asian Championships in Ho Chi Minh City in 2012, where she claimed a bronze medal in the women's 46 kg competition. She was a member of the Iranian national team for eight years. Since moving to the Netherlands, she competes for the latter as well as the refugee team under the IOC team flag.

Pouryounes left Iran for the Netherlands in 2015. In September 2015, she won her first international world ranking medal at the Polish Open while she was still living in an asylum centre. She then became the first refugee athlete to compete at the World Taekwondo Championships.

She was included as one of 29 members of the IOC Refugee Olympic Team to compete at the 2020 Summer Olympics.

Pouryounes has won 50 world ranking medals and has almost always been ranked top 5 of her category in the World Rankings. Her latest medal is a bronze in the women's 49 kg competition at the 2024 Croatia Open, held in the Zagreb.

She was selected for the IOC Refugee Team for the Paris Games. She was defeated by eventual silver medalist Guo Qing of China. She became 7th at the Paris Olympic Games and got an Olympic diploma.
