= Croatia at the 2023 European Games =

- Flag of Croatia
- IOC code: CRO
- NOC: Croatian Olympic Committee
- Website: www.hoo.hr

in Kraków and Małopolska, Poland 21 June – 2 July 2023
- Competitors: 130 in 23 sports
- Flag bearers: Nikolina Ćaćić; Matej Neveščanin (opening)
- Medals Ranked 17th: Gold 5 Silver 4 Bronze 4 Total 13

European Games appearances (overview)
- 2015; 2019; 2023; 2027

Croatia competed at the 2023 European Games, in Kraków and Małopolska, Poland, from 21 June to 2 July 2023.

== Medalists ==
Medal	Name	Sport	Event	Date
Gold	Anđelo Kvesić	Karate	Men's +84 kg	23 June
Gold	Lena Stojković	Taekwondo	Women's -46 kg	23 June
Gold	Ivana Duvančić	Taekwondo	Women's -53 kg	24 June
Gold	Ivan Šapina	Taekwondo	Men's -87 kg	26 June
Gold	Giovanni Cernogoraz; Anton Glasnović; Francesco Ravalico	Shooting	Men's team trap	2 July
Silver	Filip Mihaljević	Athletics	Men's shot put	22 June
Silver	Josip Sikavica; Petar Gorša; Miran Maričić	Shooting	Men's team 10 meter air rifle	24 June
Silver	Lovre Brečić	Taekwondo	Men's -63 kg	24 June
Silver	Gabrijel Veočić	Boxing	Men's -80 kg	1 July
Bronze	Kristina Tomić	Taekwondo	Women's -57 kg	24 June
Bronze	Paško Božić	Taekwondo	Men's +87 kg	26 June
Bronze	Nika Klepac	Taekwondo	Women's -73 kg	26 June
Bronze	Antonija Zec	Kickboxing	Women's FC -70 kg	1 July

== Competitors ==
The following is the list of number of competitors at the Games.

Sport	Men	Women	Total
Archery	1	0	1
Athletics	20	20	45
Badminton	1	0	1
Beach handball	12	0	12
Boxing	5	3	8
Canoe slalom	2	1	3
Canoe sprint	0	2	2
Cycling BMX	1	0	1
Diving	2	0	2
Fencing	4	3	7
Judo	3	3	6
Karate	2	1	3
Kickboxing	0	2	2
Muaythai	1	2	3
Shooting	7	2	9
Table tennis	4	2	6
Taekwondo	7	8	15
Teqball	2	2	4
Total	54	31	130

== Archery ==
Individual Events

Athlete	Event	Ranking round		Round of 64	Round of 32	Round of 16	Quarterfinal	Semi-final	Final / BM	
Athlete	Event	Score	Seed	Opposition Score	Opposition Score	Opposition Score	Opposition Score	Opposition Score	Opposition Score	Rank
Lovro Černi	Men's recurve	658	24	Duchon (SVK); L 2-6	Did not advanced					

== Athletics ==
Croatia is set to compete in the second division of the 2023 European Athletics Team Championships which is going to be held in Chorzów during the Games.

=== Team events ===
Team	Event		Event points																			Total	Rank
Team	Event		100m	200m	400m	800m	1500m	5000m	110m h*	400m h	3000m SC	4 × 100 m	4 × 400 m**	SP	JT	HT	DT	PV	HJ	TJ	LJ	Total	Rank
Croatia	Team Championships Second Division	Men	4	2	7	16	3	2	7	3	13	3	9	16	3	13	11	15.5	4	4	16	301.5	9
Croatia	Team Championships Second Division	Women	5	4	10	8	9	12	7	8	3	8	9	7	14	5	14	12	8	11	6	301.5	9

key: h: hurdles; SC; Steeplechase: SP; Shot put: JT: Javelin: HT: Hammer: DT: Discus: PV: Pole vault: HJ: High jump: TJ: Triple Jump: LJ: Long Jump

- Women compete at 100 metre hurdles, rather than 110 metre hurdles.
- 4 x 400 metres is held as a single mixed sex event

=== Individual events ===
As a participant in the Team event, each nation automatically enters one athlete in each of the individual events.

Event	Male Athlete	Score	Rank	Female athlete	Score	Rank
100 m	Toma Batistić	10.91		Vita Penezić	11.72	
200 m	Marko Orešković	21.69		Veronika Drljačić	23.91	
400 m	Marko Orešković	47.09		Veronika Drljačić	52.97	
800 m	Marino Bloudek	1:47.11		Nina Vuković	2:05.53	
1500 m	Nino Jambrešić	3:49.75		Klara Andrijašević	4:17.91	
5000 m	Dino Bošnjak	15:17.21		Bojana Bjeljac	15:44.57	
110/100 m h	Lukas Cik	14.27		Ivana Lončarek	13.45	
400m h	Mateo Parlov	53.93		Natalija Švenda	1:00.87	
3000m SC	Bruno Belčić	8:25.88		Viva Kovač	11:07.41	
4 × 100 m	Toma Batistić; Hrvoje Kašik; Bruno Perec; Vito Kovačić	41.40		Melani Bosić; Margareta Risek; Mia Wild; Vita Penezić	45.48	
4 × 400 m (mixed)	—N/a			Marko Orešković; Nina Vuković; Jakov Vuković; Veronika Drljačić	3:20.24	
High jump	Martin Mlinarić	1.97		Sara Aščić	1.79	
Pole vault	Ivan Horvat	5.40		Lara Juriša	3.80	
Long Jump	Marko Čeko	7.86		Klara Barnjak	5.97	
Triple Jump	Filip Kozina	14.42		Paola Borović	13.42	
Shot put	Filip Mihaljević	21.33	2nd place, silver medalist(s)	Lucija Leko	13.74	
Discus	Martin Marković	61.72		Marija Tolj	57.06	
Hammer	Matija Gregurić	72.91		Lucija Pendić	55.98	
Javelin	Arno Marković	64.79		Sara Kolak	59.62	

== Badminton ==
Athletes	Event	Group stage		Round of 16	Quarterfinals	Semifinals	Finals	Rank
Athletes	Event	Opposition Score	Rank	Opposition Score	Opposition Score	Opposition Score	Opposition Score	Rank
Filip Špoljarec	Men's singles	C Popov (FRA) L 11–21, 9–21; Pytel (HUN) L 19–21, 6–21; Abela (MLT) W 21–11, 21–12	3	Did not advance				

== Beach Handball ==
Team	Event	Group stage				Quarterfinals / Pl	Semifinals / Pl	Final / BM / Pl	
Team	Event	Opposition Score	Opposition Score	Opposition Score	Rank	Opposition Score	Opposition Score	Opposition Score	Rank
Croatia	Men's tournament	Germany; W 2-0	Portugal; L 2-0	Hungary; W 2-0	1 Q	Denmark; L 1-2	Germany; W 2-0	Norway; W 2-1	5

== Boxing ==
Men

Athlete	Event	Round of 64	Round of 32	Round of 16	Quarterfinal	Semi-final	Final	
Athlete	Event	Opposition Result	Opposition Result	Opposition Result	Opposition Result	Opposition Result	Opposition Result	Rank
Mateo Komadina	-63 kg	Bye	Bajoku (KOS); L 1–4	Did not advance				
Petar Knežević	-71 kg	Bye	Hermeziu (ROU); W 5–0	Traore (FRA); L 0–5	Did not advance			
Gabrijel Veočić	-80 kg	Bye	Nikolov (BUL); W 4-1	Arădoaie (ROU); W 5-0	Aas (EST); W 5-0	Allahverdiyev (AZE); W 5-0	Khyzhniak (UKR); L RSC	2nd place, silver medalist(s)
Marko Čalić	-92 kg	Bye	Bošnjak (BIH); W 5-0	Urbonavičius (LTU); W 5-0	Marley (IRL); L 1-4	Did not advance		
Marko Milun	+92 kg	Bye	Orie (GBR); L 0-4	Did not advance				

Women

Athlete	Event	Round of 32	Round of 16	Quarterfinal	Semi-final	Final	
Athlete	Event	Opposition Result	Opposition Result	Opposition Result	Opposition Result	Opposition Result	Rank
Nikolina Ćaćić	-54 kg	Bye	Charaabi (ITA); L 0-5	Did not advance			
Dea Bolanča	-57 kg	Bye	Mortensen (DEN); L 0-5	Did not advance			
Sara Beram	-60 kg	Büchner (GER); W 5-0	Mehmedova (BUL); W 4-0	Shadrina (SRB); L 0-5	Did not advance		

== Canoe slalom ==
Men's events

Athlete	Event	Preliminary						Semifinal		Final	
Athlete	Event	Run 1	Rank	Run 2	Rank	Best	Rank	Time	Rank	Time	Rank
Ren Korpes	Cross	—N/a				73.24	34	Did not advance			
Ren Korpes	K-1	99.97	46	100.88	20	100.88	50	Did not advance			
Matija Marinić	C1	94.13	13	—N/a		94.13	13	107.06	23	Did not advance	

Women's events

Athlete	Event	Preliminary						Semifinal		Final	
Athlete	Event	Run 1	Rank	Run 2	Rank	Best	Rank	Time	Rank	Time	Rank
Katja Bengeri	C-1	125.54	32	120.06	12	125.54	32	Did not advance			
Katja Bengeri	K-1	102.86	24	109.78	12	109.78	32	Did not advance			

== Canoe sprint ==
Women's events

Athlete	Event	Heats		Semi-final		Final	
Athlete	Event	Time	Rank	Time	Rank	Time	Rank
Vanesa Tot	C-1 200 metres	47.694	2 QF	Bye		48.155	5
Anamaria Govorčinović	K-1 500 metres	1:54.680	3 QSF	1:53.051	1 QFA	1:51.512	4

Qualification legend: SF – Qualify to semifinal; FA – Qualify to medal final; FB – Qualify to non-medal final

== Cycling ==
BMX (park)

Athlete	Event	Qualification				Final			
Athlete	Event	Run 1	Rank	Run 2	Rank	Run 1	Rank	Run 2	Rank
Marin Rantes	Men's BMX park	85.00	2	75	11	~~36.50~~	~~12~~	83.06	5

== Diving ==
Men

Athlete	Event	Qualification		Final	
Athlete	Event	Points	Rank	Points	Rank
Matej Neveščanin	1 m springboard	306.80	18	Did not advanced	
Luka Martinović	3 m springboard	297.60	26	Did not advanced	
Matej Neveščanin	3 m springboard	355.80	20	Did not advanced	
Luka Martinović; Matej Neveščanin	Synchronized 3 m springboard	—N/a		322.20	10

== Fencing ==
Men's

Athlete	Event	Preliminaries		Round of 64	Round of 32	Round of 16	Quarterfinals	Semifinals	Final / BM	
Athlete	Event	V/B	Rank	Opposition Score	Opposition Score	Opposition Score	Opposition Score	Opposition Score	Opposition Score	Rank
Vedran Markota	Épée	2/4	75	Did not advanced						
Borna Špoljar	Foil									
Ivan Komšić	Foil									
Petar Files	Foil			Bye						

Women's

Athlete	Event	Preliminaries		Round of 64	Round of 32	Round of 16	Quarterfinals	Semifinals	Final / BM	
Athlete	Event	V/B	Rank	Opposition Score	Opposition Score	Opposition Score	Opposition Score	Opposition Score	Opposition Score	Rank
Andrea Majdandžić	Épée									
Dorja Blažić	Foil	3/3	28 q	Bye	Walczyk-Klimaszyk (POL); L 7-15	Did not advanced				
Zoe Marie Baldo	Sabre	1/5	49	Did not advanced						

Team Events

Athlete	Event	Round of 32	Round of 16	Quarterfinals	Semifinals	Final / BM
Athlete	Event	Opposition Score	Opposition Score	Opposition Score	Opposition Score	Rank
Petar Files; Ivan Komšić; Borna Špoljar	Men's team foil	Slovakia (SVK); W 45-33	France (FRA); L 29-45	Did not advanced		

== Judo ==
Athlete	Category	Round of 32	Round of 16	Quarterfinals	Semifinals	Final	
Athlete	Category	Opposition Result	Opposition Result	Opposition Result	Opposition Result	Opposition Result	Rank
Robert Klačar; Anđela Violić; Josip Bulić; Tina Radić; Marko Kumrić	Mixed team	Lithuania (LTU); W 4-0	Georgia (GEO); L 1-4	Did not advanced			

== Karate ==
Athlete	Event	Group stage				Semifinal	Final	
Athlete	Event	Opposition Score	Opposition Score	Opposition Score	Rank	Opposition Score	Opposition Score	Rank
Enes Garibović	Men's -84 kg	Bąbos (POL); W 7-0	Karaqi (ALB); L 0-2	Mastrogiannis (GRE); L 0-2	4	Did not advanced		
Anđelo Kvesić	Men's +84 kg	Şen (TUR); W 5-3	Tzanos (GRE); W 4-1	Gębka (POL); W 4-0	1 Q	Gurbanli (AZE); W 5-3	Şen (TUR); W DSQ	1st place, gold medalist(s)
Lucija Lesjak	Women's +68 kg	Ferracuti (ITA); W 2-1	Torres (ESP); L 0-2	Aliyeva (AZE); W 4-0	3	Did not advanced		

== Kickboxing ==
Athlete	Event	Quarterfinals	Semifinals	Final	
Athlete	Event	Opposition Result	Opposition Result	Opposition Result	Rank
Lara Mihalić	Women's PF 70 kg	Browne (IRL); L 2-12	Did not advance		
Antonija Zec	Women's FC 70 kg	Gur (TUR); W 2-1	Krstić (SER); L 0-3	Did not advance	3rd place, bronze medalist(s)

== Muaythai ==
Athlete	Event	Quarterfinals	Semifinals	Final	
Athlete	Event	Opposition Result	Opposition Result	Opposition Result	Rank
Toni Ćatipović	Men's -91 kg	Pryimachov (UKR); L 26-30	Did not advance		
Željana Piteša	Women's -57 kg	Devrishova (AZE); L 26-30	Did not advance		
Marija Bodač	Women's -63.5 kg	Tacyıldız (TUR); L 27-30	Did not advance		

== Shooting ==
Men's

Athlete	Event	Qualification		Semifinal		Final	
Athlete	Event	Points	Rank	Points	Rank	Points	Rank
Josip Sikavica	10 meter air rifle	625.9	26	—N/a		Did not advanced	
Petar Gorša	50 meter rifle three positions	591	7 Q	—N/a		301.3	8
Miran Maričić	50 meter rifle three positions	589	10	—N/a		Did not advanced	
Francesco Ravalico	Trap	122	6 Q	20	2 Q	30	4
Anton Glasnović	Trap	121	10	—N/a		Did not advanced	
Josip Sikavica; Petar Gorša; Miran Maričić	Team 10 meter air rifle	939.3	8 Q	627.8	2 Q	Turkey (TUR); L 2-16	2nd place, silver medalist(s)
Josip Sikavica; Petar Gorša; Miran Maričić	Team 50 meter rifle three positions	1313	7 Q	873	8	Did not advanced	
Giovanni Cernogoraz; Anton Glasnović; Francesco Ravalico	Team trap	218	1 Q	—N/a		Slovakia (SVK); W 7-3	1st place, gold medalist(s)

Women's

Athlete	Event	Qualification		Final	
Athlete	Event	Points	Rank	Points	Rank
Lana Skelendžija	10 meter air pistol	564	26	Did not advanced	
Marta Zeljković	10 meter air rifle	621.6	34	Did not advanced	
Marta Zeljković	50 meter rifle three positions	587	8 Q	302.9	8

Mixed

Athlete	Event	Qualification		Final	
Athlete	Event	Points	Rank	Points	Rank
Marta Zeljković; Miran Maričić	Mixed team 10 meter air rifle	NM	DNS	Did not advanced	
Marta Zeljković; Petar Gorša	Mixed team 50 meter rifle three positions	871	15	Did not advanced	

== Table tennis ==
Athlete	Event	Round 1	Round 2	Round 3	Round of 16	Quarterfinals	Semifinals	Final / BM	
Athlete	Event	Opposition Score	Opposition Score	Opposition Score	Opposition Score	Opposition Score	Opposition Score	Opposition Score	Rank
Andrej Gaćina	Men's singles	Bye		Kožul (SLO); W 4-2	Nuytinck (BEL); W 4-1	Habesohn (AUT); W 4-1	F. Lebrun (FRA); L 0-4	A. Lebrun (FRA); L w/o	4
Tomislav Pucar	Men's singles	Bye		Freitas (POR); L 2-4	Did not advanced				
Hana Arapović	Women's singles	Bye	Marchetti (BEL); W 4-3	Matelová (CZE); L 3-4	Did not advanced				
Ivana Malobabić	Women's singles	Bye	Mischek (AUT); W 4-3	Balážová (SVK); W 4-1	Samara (ROU); W 0-4	Did not advanced			
Frane Kojić; Tomislav Pucar; Filip Zeljko	Men's team	—N/a			Denmark (DNK); L 1-3	Did not advanced			

== Taekwondo ==
Men's events

Athlete	Event	Round of 16	Quarterfinal	Semi-final	Repechage	Final	
Athlete	Event	Opposition Result	Opposition Result	Opposition Result	Opposition Result	Opposition Result	Rank
Josip Teskera	-54 kg	Bye	Marwan (SWE); L 0-2	Did not advanced			
Lovre Brečić	-63 kg	Pilavakis (CYP); W 2-0	Stanić (SRB); W 2-0	Alaphilippe (FRA); W 2-0	—N/a	Baretta (ITA); L 0-2	2nd place, silver medalist(s)
Leon Glasnović	-68 kg	Galland (SUI); W 2-1	Dzhordzhev (BUL); W 2-1	Sinden (GBR); L 1-2	—N/a	Chamalidis (GRE); L 1-2	5
Marko Golubić	-74 kg	Chehade (SWE); W 2-0	Yıldız (TUR); W 2-1	Husić (BIH); L 0-2	—N/a	Quesada (ESP); L 0-2	5
Matej Nikolić	-80 kg	Mehdipournejad (ROT); L 0-2	Did not advanced				
Ivan Šapina	-87 kg	Bye	Tholiotis (GRE); W 2-0	Biçer (TUR); W 2-0	—N/a	Divković (SLO); W 2-0	1st place, gold medalist(s)
Paško Božić	+87 kg	Lenkewitz (GER); W 2-0	Szaferski (POL); W 2-0	Cunningham (GBR); L 0-2	—N/a	Harbar (UKR); W 2-0	3rd place, bronze medalist(s)

Women's events

Athlete	Event	Round of 16	Quarterfinal	Semi-final	Repechage	Final	
Athlete	Event	Opposition Result	Opposition Result	Opposition Result	Opposition Result	Opposition Result	Rank
Lena Stojković	-46 kg	Csáki (HUN); W 2-0	Goodman (GBR); W 2-0	Kouttouki (CYP); W 2-0	—N/a	Zampetti (ITA); W 2-0	1st place, gold medalist(s)
Bruna Duvančić	-49 kg	Maestro (ITA); L 1-2	Did not advance				
Ivana Duvančić	-53 kg	Coman (ROU); W 2-0	Lager (ISR); W 2-0	Aydin (GER); W 2-1	—N/a	Pérez (ESP); W 2-0	1st place, gold medalist(s)
Kristina Tomić	-57 kg	Schoenmakers (NED); W 2-0	Adamkiewicz (POL); W 2-0	Jones (GBR); L w/o	—N/a	Kalteki (GRE); W 2-0	3rd place, bronze medalist(s)
Ivana Arelić	-62 kg	Frömming (GER); W 2-0	Sarvanaki (GRE); W 2-0	Štolbová (CZE); L 0-2	—N/a	Tarvida (LAT); L 1-2	5
Matea Jelić	-67 kg	Kayır (TUR); W 2-0	Körndl (GER); W 2-1	Perišić (SRB); L 1-2	—N/a	D'Angelo (ITA); L 1-2	5
Nika Klepac	-73 kg	Georgievska (MKD); W 2-0	McGowan (GBR); W WD	Uzunçavdar (TUR); L 0-2	—N/a	Smiraglia (ITA); W 2-0	3rd place, bronze medalist(s)
Nika Petanjek	+73 kg	Castiñeira (ESP); L 0-2	Did not advance				

== Teqball ==
Athlete	Event	Group stage				Quarterfinal	Semifinal	Final	
Athlete	Event	Opposition Score	Opposition Score	Opposition Score	Rank	Opposition Score	Opposition Score	Opposition Score	Rank
Antonija Vranić	Women's singles	Janicsek (HUN); L 0-2	Lemajić (SRB); L 0-2	Sommer (AUT); L 0-2	4	Did not advanced			
Antonija Vranić; Patricija Pejić	Women's doubles	Romania (ROM); L 0-2	Czech Republic (CZE); L 0-2	—N/a	3	Did not advanced			
Filip Bungić; Patricija Pejić	Mixed doubles	Ukraine (UKR); L 0-2	Armenia (ARM); L 0-2	Serbia (SRB); L 0-2	4	Did not advanced			
