= 2022 World Taekwondo Championships – Men's heavyweight =

Taekwondo competitions

Men's heavyweight at the 2022 World Championships
- Venue: Centro Acuático CODE Metropolitano
- Dates: 17 November 2022
- Competitors: 37 from 37 nations

Medalists
gold medal	Carlos Sansores	Mexico
silver medal	Iván García	Spain
bronze medal	Sajjad Mardani	Iran
bronze medal	Song Zhaoxiang	China

The men's heavyweight is a competition featured at the 2022 World Taekwondo Championships, and was held at the Centro Acuático CODE Metropolitano in Guadalajara, Mexico on 17 November 2022. Heavyweights were limited to a minimum of 87 kilograms in body mass.

== Results ==
Legend

- DQ — Won by disqualification
- R — Won by referee stop contest
- W — Won by withdrawal

=== Finals ===
Semifinals				Final
Sajjad Mardani (IRI)	3	3	2
Carlos Sansores (MEX)	1	3	2	Carlos Sansores (MEX)	5	4
Song Zhaoxiang (CHN)	1	2		Iván García (ESP)	3	0
Iván García (ESP)	2	2

=== Top half ===
==== Section 1 ====
Round of 64
Kyle Nolan (AUS)	2	2
Anas Sadek (JOR)	8	10

Round of 32
Emre Kutalmış Ateşli (TUR)	6	4
Anas Sadek (JOR)	0	2
Alasan Ann (GAM)	4	2	5
Anthony Obame (GAB)	4	3	3
Ayoub Bassel (MAR)	3	7	1
Andrii Harbar (UKR)	5	0	2
Luis Álvarez (VEN)	0	7	2
Sajjad Mardani (IRI)	3	6	4

Round of 16
Emre Kutalmış Ateşli (TUR)	5	2
Alasan Ann (GAM)	6	2
Andrii Harbar (UKR)	2	2
Sajjad Mardani (IRI)	3	4

Quarterfinals
Alasan Ann (GAM)	2	2
Sajjad Mardani (IRI)	3	4

==== Section 2 ====
Round of 64
Marat Mavlonov (UZB)	D	Q
~~Moses Obara (KEN)~~
~~Raja Wanigasekara (SRI)~~
Kensuke Wada (JPN)	D	Q

Round of 32
Jonathan Healy (USA)	1	6	5
Marat Mavlonov (UZB)	2	0	3
Abdoul Razak Issoufou (NIG)	3	3
Paško Božić (CRO)	1	2
Ivan Trajkovič (SLO)	5	11
Ray Rahy (LBN)	3	4
Kensuke Wada (JPN)	1	2
Carlos Sansores (MEX)	7	12^{R}

Round of 16
Jonathan Healy (USA)	1	1
Abdoul Razak Issoufou (NIG)	1	0
Ivan Trajkovič (SLO)	3	4
Carlos Sansores (MEX)	5	8

Quarterfinals
Jonathan Healy (USA)	0	1	1
Carlos Sansores (MEX)	0	2	5

=== Bottom half ===
==== Section 3 ====
Round of 64
~~Aboubacar Soumah (GUI)~~
Andreas Stylianou (CYP)	D	Q

Round of 32
Rafael Alba (CUB)	8	4^{W}
Andreas Stylianou (CYP)	0	0
Marc-André Bergeron (CAN)	3	0
Ruslan Zhaparov (KAZ)	7	2
Song Zhaoxiang (CHN)	13	4
Milos Pilipovic (NOR)	5	1
Walter Saldarriaga (COL)	1	5
Dejan Georgievski (MKD)	5	8

Round of 16
Rafael Alba (CUB)	11
Ruslan Zhaparov (KAZ)	8	W
Song Zhaoxiang (CHN)	8	13
Dejan Georgievski (MKD)	4	1

Quarterfinals
Ruslan Zhaparov (KAZ)	4	4
Song Zhaoxiang (CHN)	6	6

==== Section 4 ====
Round of 64
Jonathan Laurent (MRN)	5	4	4
Jung Jiun-jie (TPE)	1	8	5

Round of 32
Iván García (ESP)	11	8
Jerry Vázquez (PUR)	0	1
Seydou Gbané (CIV)	3	5	2
Omar El-Yazidi (FRA)	4	3	4
Caden Cunningham (GBR)	9	6	7
Kang Yeon-ho (KOR)	10	3	4
Jung Jiun-jie (TPE)	2	0
Maicon Andrade (BRA)	3	2

Round of 16
Iván García (ESP)	1	2
Omar El-Yazidi (FRA)	0	2
Caden Cunningham (GBR)	2	0	1
Maicon Andrade (BRA)	2	3	3

Quarterfinals
Iván García (ESP)	4	10
Maicon Andrade (BRA)	2	5
