= 2019 World Taekwondo Championships – Men's heavyweight =

Men's heavyweight at the 2019 World Championships
- Venue: Manchester Arena
- Dates: 19 May 2019
- Competitors: 36 from 36 nations

Medalists
gold medal	Rafael Alba	Cuba
silver medal	Carlos Sansores	Mexico
bronze medal	Maicon Andrade	Brazil
bronze medal	Hamza Kattan	Jordan

The men's heavyweight is a competition featured at the 2019 World Taekwondo Championships, and was held at the Manchester Arena in Manchester, United Kingdom on 19 May. Heavyweights were limited to a minimum of 87 kilograms in body mass.

== Results ==
Legend

- R — Won by referee stop contest
- W — Won by withdrawal

=== Finals ===
Semifinals		Final
Rafael Alba (CUB)	17
Maicon Andrade (BRA)	13	Rafael Alba (CUB)	9
Carlos Sansores (MEX)	18	Carlos Sansores (MEX)	5
Hamza Kattan (JOR)	6

=== Top half ===
==== Section 1 ====
Round of 64
Yamikani Guba (MAW)	5
Christian Ocampo (PER)	31

Round of 32
In Kyo-don (KOR)	23
Christian Ocampo (PER)	3
Dejan Georgievski (MKD)	7
Rafail Aiukaev (RUS)	22
Jonathan Healy (USA)	7
Rafael Alba (CUB)	12
Mykhailo Shelest (UKR)	8
Vedran Golec (CRO)	22

Round of 16
In Kyo-don (KOR)	21
Rafail Aiukaev (RUS)	19
Rafael Alba (CUB)	27
Vedran Golec (CRO)	6

Quarterfinals
In Kyo-don (KOR)	11
Rafael Alba (CUB)	16

==== Section 2 ====
Round of 64
Itai Sango (MOZ)	3
Lin Guan-ting (TPE)	24

Round of 32
Sajjad Mardani (IRI)	18
Jesús Perea (ECU)	2
Ayoub Bassel (MAR)	5
Maicon Andrade (BRA)	12
Marc-André Bergeron (CAN)	13
Emre Kutalmış Ateşli (TUR)	13
Lin Guan-ting (TPE)	0
Mahama Cho (GBR)	11^{R}

Round of 16
Sajjad Mardani (IRI)	8
Maicon Andrade (BRA)	10
Marc-André Bergeron (CAN)	5
Mahama Cho (GBR)	17

Quarterfinals
Maicon Andrade (BRA)	15
Mahama Cho (GBR)	12

=== Bottom half ===
==== Section 3 ====
Round of 64
Askia Alleyne (BAR)	1
Antonio Artal (ESP)	41

Round of 32
Radik Isayev (AZE)	7
Antonio Artal (ESP)	5
Carlos Sansores (MEX)	21
Sun Hongyi (CHN)	6
Ruslan Zhaparov (KAZ)	26
Cem Ünlüsoy (GER)	14
Athanasios Nikolaidis (GRE)	4
Dmitriy Shokin (UZB)	16

Round of 16
Radik Isayev (AZE)	2
Carlos Sansores (MEX)	7
Ruslan Zhaparov (KAZ)	12
Dmitriy Shokin (UZB)	15

Quarterfinals
Carlos Sansores (MEX)	16
Dmitriy Shokin (UZB)	7

==== Section 4 ====
Round of 64
Andreas Stylianou (CYP)	36
Don Berisha (KOS)	22

Round of 32
Anthony Obame (GAB)	9
Danilo Vukelić (SRB)	1
Mohamed Ayman (EGY)	2
Hamza Kattan (JOR)	9^{W}
Omar El-Yazidi (FRA)	14
Martín Sio (ARG)	3
Andreas Stylianou (CYP)	W
Abdoul Razak Issoufou (NIG)

Round of 16
Anthony Obame (GAB)	12
Hamza Kattan (JOR)	13
Omar El-Yazidi (FRA)	17
Andreas Stylianou (CYP)	5

Quarterfinals
Hamza Kattan (JOR)	12
Omar El-Yazidi (FRA)	10
