= 2025 World Taekwondo Championships – Men's heavyweight =

Taekwondo competitions

Men's heavyweight at the 2025 World Championships
- Venue: Taihu International Expo Center
- Dates: 24 October 2025
- Competitors: 43 from 41 nations

Medalists
gold medal	Kang Sang-hyun	South Korea
silver medal	Rafail Aiukaev	Individual Neutral Athletes
bronze medal	Jonathan Healy	United States
bronze medal	Caden Cunningham	Great Britain

The men's heavyweight competition at the 2025 World Taekwondo Championships was held on 24 October 2025 in Wuxi, China. Heavyweights were limited to a minimum of 87 kilograms in body mass.

== Results ==
Legend

- DQ — Won by disqualification
- P — Won by punitive declaration
- R — Won by referee stop contest

=== Finals ===
Semifinals			Final
Jonathan Healy (USA)	0	6
Kang Sang-hyun (KOR)	0	9	Kang Sang-hyun (KOR)	5	8	6
Caden Cunningham (GBR)	2	3	Rafail Aiukaev (AIN)	7	7	2
Rafail Aiukaev (AIN)	4	9

=== Top half ===
==== Section 1 ====
Round of 64
Chioke Holder (BAR)	3	2
Luis Álvarez (VEN)	6	14
Daniel Pinheiro (POR)	0	0
Paško Božić (CRO)	14	10
Paivou Gomis (GBS)	0	0
Soufiane El-Asbi (MAR)	12	9

Round of 32
Jonathan Healy (USA)	4	2^{R}
Luis Álvarez (VEN)	5	1
Huang Yu-jen (TPE)	6	10
Sotirios Michopoulos (GRE)	5	0
Beibarys Kablan (KAZ)	6	4
Paško Božić (CRO)	4	4
Soufiane El-Asbi (MAR)	0	3	2
Carlos Sansores (MEX)	4	3	3

Round of 16
Jonathan Healy (USA)	5	2
Huang Yu-jen (TPE)	0	0
Beibarys Kablan (KAZ)	11	11	4
Carlos Sansores (MEX)	3	7^{P}	3

Quarterfinals
Jonathan Healy (USA)	12	9
Beibarys Kablan (KAZ)	6	5

==== Section 2 ====
Round of 64
Seydina Seye (SEN)	7^{P}	4^{R}
Isa Saidi (AUT)	2	0
Ali Akbar Amiri (AFG)	4	5
César Silva (COL)	4	0

Round of 32
Iván García (ESP)	3	1	9
Seydina Seye (SEN)	1	5	2
Petros Andreou (CYP)	0	3
Kang Sang-hyun (KOR)	3	5
Omar El-Yazidi (FRA)	3	6
Patrik Divkovič (SLO)	2	5
Ali Akbar Amiri (AFG)	0	2
Wang Yaoxi (CHN)	4	3

Round of 16
Iván García (ESP)	3	6	1
Kang Sang-hyun (KOR)	6	6	4
Omar El-Yazidi (FRA)	7	1
Wang Yaoxi (CHN)	10	6

Quarterfinals
Kang Sang-hyun (KOR)	9	2
Wang Yaoxi (CHN)	2	1

=== Bottom half ===
==== Section 3 ====
Round of 64
~~Seyni Souleymane (NIG)~~
Jonathan Laurent (MRN)	D	Q
Shiva Singh (IND)	1	2
Pedro Alves (BRA)	5	13
Alexandre Essogho (GAB)	12	8
Raihau Mai-Apa (FPO)	0	0

Round of 32
Marat Mavlonov (UZB)	2	10
Jonathan Laurent (MRN)	0	0
Mattia Molin (ITA)	0	4	5
Artsiom Plonis (AIN)	9	4	5
Abdullah Essam (EGY)	1	2	4
Pedro Alves (BRA)	0	6	3
Alexandre Essogho (GAB)	0	8
Caden Cunningham (GBR)	12	10

Round of 16
Marat Mavlonov (UZB)	5	7
Mattia Molin (ITA)	2	5
Abdullah Essam (EGY)	0	5
Caden Cunningham (GBR)	9	7

Quarterfinals
Marat Mavlonov (UZB)	0	5
Caden Cunningham (GBR)	8	7

==== Section 4 ====
Round of 64
Mamadou Bassirou Thiam (CAN)	3	0
Emre Kutalmış Ateşli (TUR)	9	2
Alasan Ann (GAM)	2	3	5
Charbel Kyrillos (LBN)	1	4	5
Ilir Soulimani (SUI)	1	0
Yoikel Goicochea (CUB)	4	12

Round of 32
Rafail Aiukaev (AIN)	5	5
Emre Kutalmış Ateşli (TUR)	2	0
Charbel Kyrillos (LBN)	7	3
Aiden Stilley (AUS)	14	4
Krystian Haremza (POL)	0	2	4
Andrii Harbar (UKR)	1	2	11
Yoikel Goicochea (CUB)	0	2
Arian Salimi (IRI)	9	7

Round of 16
Rafail Aiukaev (AIN)	4	9
Aiden Stilley (AUS)	2	2
Andrii Harbar (UKR)	6	1	4
Arian Salimi (IRI)	6	3	3

Quarterfinals
Rafail Aiukaev (AIN)	6^{P}	7^{P}
Andrii Harbar (UKR)	2	2
