= 2013 World Taekwondo Championships – Men's middleweight =

Taekwondo competition

Men's middleweight at the 2013 World Championships
- Venue: Exhibition Center of Puebla
- Dates: 19 July 2013
- Competitors: 49 from 48 nations

Medalists
gold medal	Rafael Alba	Cuba
silver medal	Ma Zhaoyong	China
bronze medal	Yassine Trabelsi	Tunisia
bronze medal	Radik Isayev	Azerbaijan

The men's middleweight is a competition featured at the 2013 World Taekwondo Championships, and was held at the Exhibition Center of Puebla in Puebla, Mexico on July 19. Middleweights were limited to a minimum of 87 kilograms in body mass.

== Results ==
- DQ — Won by disqualification
- K — Won by knockout
- P — Won by punitive declaration
- W — Won by disqualification

=== Finals ===
Semifinals		Final
Yassine Trabelsi (TUN)	3
Rafael Alba (CUB)	9	Rafael Alba (CUB)	4
Ma Zhaoyong (CHN)	3	Ma Zhaoyong (CHN)	2
Radik Isayev (AZE)	2

=== Top half ===
==== Section 1 ====
Round of 64
Mehdi Khodabakhshi (IRI)	18
Shin Yeong-rae (KOR)	8
Yang Yi-chang (TPE)	3
Rémy Alazoula (CAF)	4
Balázs Tóth (HUN)	3
Douglas Marcelino (BRA)	6
Yassine Trabelsi (TUN)	15
Constantinos Odysseos (CYP)	1
Eje Celestin (TTO)	1
M'Bar N'Diaye (FRA)	14

Round of 32
Jason Neville (USA)	6
Mehdi Khodabakhshi (IRI)	9
Rémy Alazoula (CAF)	5^{K}
Douglas Marcelino (BRA)	4
Ivan Nikitin (RUS)	1
Yassine Trabelsi (TUN)	2
M'Bar N'Diaye (FRA)	7
Uche Chukwumerije (NGR)	4

Round of 16
Mehdi Khodabakhshi (IRI)	9
Rémy Alazoula (CAF)	2
Yassine Trabelsi (TUN)	11
M'Bar N'Diaye (FRA)	9

Quarterfinals
Mehdi Khodabakhshi (IRI)	3
Yassine Trabelsi (TUN)	4

==== Section 2 ====
Round of 64
Leonardo Salimbeni (ARG)	6
Steeven Molina (HON)	8
Tuarai Hery (FPO)	8
Vitoldas Dzikevič (LTU)	4
Ángel Román (PUR)	1
Rafael Alba (CUB)	4
~~Jurmen Amiena (SUR)~~
Moisés Molinares (COL)	DQ

Round of 32
Marc-André Bergeron (CAN)	5
Steeven Molina (HON)	1
Tuarai Hery (FPO)	5
David Adjetey (GHA)	7^{P}
Christian Alvarado (MEX)	0
Rafael Alba (CUB)	11
Moisés Molinares (COL)	11
Lutalo Muhammad (GBR)	15

Round of 16
Marc-André Bergeron (CAN)	7
David Adjetey (GHA)	4
Rafael Alba (CUB)	10
Lutalo Muhammad (GBR)	3

Quarterfinals
Marc-André Bergeron (CAN)	3
Rafael Alba (CUB)	9

=== Bottom half ===
==== Section 3 ====
Round of 64
Kenneth Edwards (JAM)	DQ
~~Jean Basile Kalisa (RWA)~~
Dafydd Sanders (NZL)	12
Abdullah Al-Enezi (KUW)	7
Ioseb Osidze (GEO)	8
Ma Zhaoyong (CHN)	20
Dionys Kronreif (GER)	8
Aram Muñoz (ESP)	7

Round of 32
Seydou Gbané (CIV)	7
Kenneth Edwards (JAM)	10
Dafydd Sanders (NZL)	DQ
~~Fatai Souleymane (CHA)~~
Kristopher Uy (PHI)	5
Ma Zhaoyong (CHN)	6
Dionys Kronreif (GER)	4
Jasur Baykuziyev (UZB)	7

Round of 16
Kenneth Edwards (JAM)	18
Dafydd Sanders (NZL)	4
Ma Zhaoyong (CHN)	5
Jasur Baykuziyev (UZB)	2

Quarterfinals
Kenneth Edwards (JAM)	6
Ma Zhaoyong (CHN)	7

==== Section 4 ====
Round of 64
Konstantinos Gkoltsios (GRE)	8
Tomáš Kališka (SVK)	2
Anand Pandiarajan (WTF)	7
Douglas Townsend (ISV)	4
Đorđe Marčetić (SRB)	4
Radik Isayev (AZE)	17
Genadi Arustamyan (ARM)	19
Michael Stevens (AUS)	4

Round of 32
Jeroen Wanrooij (NED)	5
Konstantinos Gkoltsios (GRE)	6
Anand Pandiarajan (WTF)	3
Ali Sarı (TUR)	5
Mohammed El-Hatri (NOR)	4
Radik Isayev (AZE)	9
Genadi Arustamyan (ARM)	DQ
~~Carlo Molfetta (ITA)~~

Round of 16
Konstantinos Gkoltsios (GRE)	7
Ali Sarı (TUR)	6
Radik Isayev (AZE)	W
Genadi Arustamyan (ARM)

Quarterfinals
Konstantinos Gkoltsios (GRE)	5
Radik Isayev (AZE)	9
