= 2015 World Taekwondo Championships – Men's middleweight =

Taekwondo competition

Men's middleweight at the 2015 World Championships
- Venue: Traktor Ice Arena
- Dates: 16–17 May 2015
- Competitors: 47 from 47 nations

Medalists
gold medal	Radik Isayev	Azerbaijan
silver medal	Jasur Baykuziyev	Uzbekistan
bronze medal	Vladislav Larin	Russia
bronze medal	Rafael Alba	Cuba

The men's middleweight is a competition featured at the 2015 World Taekwondo Championships, and was held at the Traktor Ice Arena in Chelyabinsk, Russia on May 16 and May 17. Middleweights were limited to a maximum of 87 kilograms in body mass.

== Results ==
Legend

- DQ — Won by disqualification

=== Finals ===
Semifinals		Final
Jasur Baykuziyev (UZB)	3
Vladislav Larin (RUS)	1	Jasur Baykuziyev (UZB)	4
Radik Isayev (AZE)	7	Radik Isayev (AZE)	5
Rafael Alba (CUB)	6

=== Top half ===
==== Section 1 ====
Round of 64
Miloš Golubović (SRB)	19
Vladyslav Bondar (UKR)	10
~~Phillip Rufasha (ZIM)~~
Karamoko Soumaré (MLI)	DQ
~~Douglas Townsend (ISV)~~
Claudiu Roseanu (ROU)	DQ

Round of 32
Jasur Baykuziyev (UZB)	8
Miloš Golubović (SRB)	2
Carlo Molfetta (ITA)	12
Dafydd Sanders (NZL)	5
Misael López (MEX)	9
Karamoko Soumaré (MLI)	5
Claudiu Roseanu (ROU)	3
Alexander Bachmann (GER)	4

Round of 16
Jasur Baykuziyev (UZB)	9
Carlo Molfetta (ITA)	5
Misael López (MEX)	2
Alexander Bachmann (GER)	1

Quarterfinals
Jasur Baykuziyev (UZB)	3
Misael López (MEX)	2

==== Section 2 ====
Round of 64
Lee Seung-hwan (KOR)	10
Kyriakos Stratouras (CYP)	1
Smaiyl Duisebay (KAZ)	15
Saturday Bashir (NGR)	7
Edson Breedy (TTO)	5
Kenneth Edwards (JAM)	8
Apostolos Telikostoglou (GRE)	6
John Lee da Silva (BRA)	5

Round of 32
Marc-André Bergeron (CAN)	6
Lee Seung-hwan (KOR)	5
Smaiyl Duisebay (KAZ)	12
Daniel Ros (ESP)	16
Ma Zhaoyong (CHN)	8
Kenneth Edwards (JAM)	5
Apostolos Telikostoglou (GRE)	9
Vladislav Larin (RUS)	15

Round of 16
Marc-André Bergeron (CAN)	7
Daniel Ros (ESP)	8
Ma Zhaoyong (CHN)	2
Vladislav Larin (RUS)	10

Quarterfinals
Daniel Ros (ESP)	5
Vladislav Larin (RUS)	10

=== Bottom half ===
==== Section 3 ====
Round of 64
Imtiaz Ibne Ali (BAN)	DQ
~~Ahmed Yousif (SUD)~~
Omid Amidi (IRI)	DQ
~~Eugene Mulunda (KEN)~~
Hao Chao (MAC)	10
Moisés Molinares (COL)	3
Tero Kuorikoski (FIN)	2
Bartosz Kołecki (POL)	7

Round of 32
Radik Isayev (AZE)	19
Imtiaz Ibne Ali (BAN)	0
Omid Amidi (IRI)	13
Chang Kai (TPE)	14
Jeroen Wanrooij (NED)	7
Hao Chao (MAC)	6
Bartosz Kołecki (POL)	4
M'Bar N'Diaye (FRA)	10

Round of 16
Radik Isayev (AZE)	13
Chang Kai (TPE)	3
Jeroen Wanrooij (NED)	7
M'Bar N'Diaye (FRA)	17

Quarterfinals
Radik Isayev (AZE)	8
M'Bar N'Diaye (FRA)	2

==== Section 4 ====
Round of 64
Mohammed El-Hatri (NOR)	3
Mohammad Ayman (JOR)	0
Abdelrahman El-Gohary (EGY)	6
Kanstantsin Yarmak (BLR)	7
Issa Bamba (CIV)	10
Carlos Rivas (VEN)	13
Phillip Yun (USA)	8
Noureddine Ziani (MAR)	7

Round of 32
Rafael Alba (CUB)	7
Mohammed El-Hatri (NOR)	2
Kanstantsin Yarmak (BLR)	DQ
~~Lutalo Muhammad (GBR)~~
Serdar Yüksel (TUR)	9
Carlos Rivas (VEN)	4
Phillip Yun (USA)	8
Yassine Trabelsi (TUN)	9

Round of 16
Rafael Alba (CUB)	13
Kanstantsin Yarmak (BLR)	1
Serdar Yüksel (TUR)	7
Yassine Trabelsi (TUN)	8

Quarterfinals
Rafael Alba (CUB)	9
Yassine Trabelsi (TUN)	4
