= 2023 World Taekwondo Championships – Men's heavyweight =

Taekwondo competitions

Men's heavyweight at the 2023 World Championships
- Venue: Baku Crystal Hall
- Dates: 4 June 2023
- Competitors: 45 from 45 nations

Medalists
gold medal	Cheick Sallah Cissé	Ivory Coast
silver medal	Carlos Sansores	Mexico
bronze medal	Emre Kutalmış Ateşli	Turkey
bronze medal	Paško Božić	Croatia

The men's heavyweight is a competition featured at the 2023 World Taekwondo Championships, and was held at the Baku Crystal Hall in Baku, Azerbaijan on 4 June 2023. Heavyweights were limited to a minimum of 87 kilograms in body mass.

== Results ==
=== Finals ===
Semifinals			Final
Carlos Sansores (MEX)	1	2
Emre Kutalmış Ateşli (TUR)	0	0	Carlos Sansores (MEX)	1	1
Cheick Sallah Cissé (CIV)	8	5	Cheick Sallah Cissé (CIV)	2	2
Paško Božić (CRO)	6	1

=== Top half ===
==== Section 1 ====
Round of 64
Lee Meng-en (TPE)	4	2	12
Jonathan Laurent (MRN)	3	4	0
Preetham Raghu (IND)	8	0
Luis Álvarez (VEN)	10	10
Anas Sadek (JOR)	21	8
Filippos Dimitrakopoulos (GRE)	5	5

Round of 32
Carlos Sansores (MEX)	5	2
Lee Meng-en (TPE)	3	0
Alasan Ann (GAM)	1	4	3
Marc-André Bergeron (CAN)	9	3	1
Song Zhaoxiang (CHN)	6	5	5
Luis Álvarez (VEN)	2	5	0
Anas Sadek (JOR)	9	3
Jonathan Healy (USA)	0	0

Round of 16
Carlos Sansores (MEX)	4	5
Alasan Ann (GAM)	3	2
Song Zhaoxiang (CHN)	3	8	3
Anas Sadek (JOR)	6	7	9

Quarterfinals
Carlos Sansores (MEX)	2	5	4
Anas Sadek (JOR)	1	7	3

==== Section 2 ====
Round of 64
Malick Niang (SEN)	3	4
Mikołaj Szaferski (POL)	13	10
Hamzah Omar Saeed (PAK)	2	4	4
Petros Andreou (CYP)	3	3	1
Adam Meyers (AUS)	0	4
Abdoul Razak Issoufou (NIG)	9	11
Nouhoum Diawara (MLI)	5	2	7
César Nazareno (ECU)	6	1	6

Round of 32
Emre Kutalmış Ateşli (TUR)	5	3
Mikołaj Szaferski (POL)	2	2
Hamzah Omar Saeed (PAK)	5	1
Ruslan Zhaparov (KAZ)	13	5
Omar El-Yazidi (FRA)	3	0	2
Abdoul Razak Issoufou (NIG)	1	6	0
Nouhoum Diawara (MLI)	0	5	3
Hamid Reza Badri (AZE)	5	5	8

Round of 16
Emre Kutalmış Ateşli (TUR)	17	2	7
Ruslan Zhaparov (KAZ)	7	2	6
Omar El-Yazidi (FRA)	3	3	0
Hamid Reza Badri (AZE)	8	2	0

Quarterfinals
Emre Kutalmış Ateşli (TUR)	9	1	8
Hamid Reza Badri (AZE)	2	3	3

=== Bottom half ===
==== Section 3 ====
Round of 64
Marat Mavlonov (UZB)	10	10	15
Marc Lenkewitz (GER)	5	10	2
Chioke Holder (BAR)	1	6
Ray Rahy (LBN)	7	18
Ali Akbar Amiri (AFG)	6	13
Aleksandr Filippov (ISR)	0	5

Round of 32
Cheick Sallah Cissé (CIV)	7	13
Marat Mavlonov (UZB)	1	1
Anthony Obame (GAB)	7	2	4
Ivan Trajkovič (SLO)	4	4	4
Ayoub Bassel (MAR)	7	7
Ray Rahy (LBN)	5	5
Ali Akbar Amiri (AFG)	2	7
Dejan Georgievski (MKD)	2	3

Round of 16
Cheick Sallah Cissé (CIV)	3	5	2
Anthony Obame (GAB)	0	8	0
Ayoub Bassel (MAR)	4	0	3
Ali Akbar Amiri (AFG)	1	2	2

Quarterfinals
Cheick Sallah Cissé (CIV)	10	9
Ayoub Bassel (MAR)	1	3

==== Section 4 ====
Round of 64
Ermin Trncic (SWE)	4	0
Bae Yoon-min (KOR)	9	8
Bryan Zonderop (NED)	0	5
Dragoș Marinescu (MDA)	6	5
Walter Saldarriaga (COL)	0	8
Agustin Alves (ARG)	1	10

Round of 32
Iván García (ESP)	2	2
Bae Yoon-min (KOR)	7	4
Dragoș Marinescu (MDA)	0	2
Paško Božić (CRO)	4	5
Caden Cunningham (GBR)	9	7
Alireza Nadalian (IRI)	7	1
Agustin Alves (ARG)	2	5
Maicon Andrade (BRA)	3	6

Round of 16
Bae Yoon-min (KOR)	12	1
Paško Božić (CRO)	13	2
Caden Cunningham (GBR)	2	0	1
Maicon Andrade (BRA)	0	2	1

Quarterfinals
Paško Božić (CRO)	4	7
Caden Cunningham (GBR)	2	6
