= Rafail Aiukaev =

Russian taekwondo practitioner (born 1996)

Personal information
- Nationality: Russian
- Born: 10 November 1996 (age 29)

Sport
- Sport: Taekwondo
- Event: Heavyweight
Medal record
Men's taekwondo
Representing Individual Neutral Athletes
World Championships
Silver medal – second place	2025 Wuxi	+87 kg
Representing Russia
Universiade
Gold medal – first place	2017 Taipei	+87 kg
Gold medal – first place	2017 Taipei	Team Kyorugi

Rafail Rushanovich Aiukaev (Russian: Рафаиль Рушанович Аюкаев; born 10 November 1996) is a Russian taekwondo practitioner. He was a silver medalist at the 2025 World Taekwondo Championships.

== Career ==
From Syzran, he was coached in Taekwondo by Anar and Tural Askerovs. He won the +87 kg division at the 2017 World University Games in Taipei, Taiwan, defeating 2016 Olympic champion Radik Isayev in the semi final and was awarded gold after his opponent in the final, Maicon Andrade of Brazil, withdrew.

In 2019 in Bari, Italy, he won the G4 Extra European Taekwondo Championships defeating Alexander Bachmann of Germany in the final of the 87 kg division.

Competing as a Russian Individual Neutral Athletes (AIN) he defeated compatriot and 2020 Olympic champion Vladislav Larin in the final of the men’s +87 kg category at the 10th WT Presidents Cup 2025 Europe Region in May 2025 in Sofia, Bulgaria.

He was a silver medalist in the heavyweight division at the 2025 World Taekwondo Championships in China in October 2025, defeating Andrii Harbar of Ukraine and then Caden Cunningham of Great Britain in the semi-final in two rounds (4-2, 9-4), before losing in the final in three rounds against South Korean Kang Sang-hyun.
