= Divkovic =

Divkovic may refer to:

- Divković, a surname found in Bosnia and Croatia
- Divkovič, a surname found in Slovenia
