= 2024 European Taekwondo Championships – Men's +87 kg =

Men's +87 kg at the 2024 European Taekwondo Championships
- Venue: Belgrade Fair – Hall 1
- Location: Belgrade, Serbia
- Dates: 12 May
- Competitors: 19 from 19 nations

Medalists
gold medal	Caden Cunningham	Great Britain
silver medal	Iván García	Spain
bronze medal	Krystian Haremza	Poland
bronze medal	Emre Kutalmış Ateşli	Turkey

The men's +87 kg competition at the 2024 European Taekwondo Championships was held on 12 May 2024.

== Results ==
=== Finals ===
Semifinals
Caden Cunningham (GBR)	2
Krystian Haremza (POL)	0
Iván García (ESP)	2
Emre Kutalmış Ateşli (TUR)	0

Final
Caden Cunningham (GBR)	2
Iván García (ESP)	1

=== Top half ===
==== Section 1 ====
Round of 32
Filippos Dimitrakopoulos (GRE)	2
Petros Andreou (CYP)	1

Round of 16
Caden Cunningham (GBR)	2
Filippos Dimitrakopoulos (GRE)	0
Andrii Harbar (UKR)	0
Ivan Trajkovič (SLO)	2

Quarterfinals
Caden Cunningham (GBR)	2
Ivan Trajkovič (SLO)	0

==== Section 2 ====
Round of 16
Paško Božić (CRO)	0
Krystian Haremza (POL)	2
Aleksandr Filippov (ISR)	2
Mihailo Radaković (SRB)	0

Quarterfinals
Krystian Haremza (POL)	2
Aleksandr Filippov (ISR)	0

=== Bottom half ===
==== Section 3 ====
Round of 32
André Viana (POR)	0
Dragoș Marinescu (MDA)	2

Round of 16
Iván García (ESP)	2
Dragoș Marinescu (MDA)	0
Hamidreza Badrialiabadi (AZE)	2
Dejan Georgievski (MKD)	0

Quarterfinals
Iván García (ESP)	2
Hamidreza Badrialiabadi (AZE)	0

==== Section 4 ====
Round of 32
Mattia Molin (ITA)
Robert Manea (ROU)

Round of 16
Vladislav Larin (AIN)	2
Bryan Zonderop (NED)	0
Mattia Molin (ITA)	0
Emre Kutalmış Ateşli (TUR)	2

Quarterfinals
Vladislav Larin (AIN)	1
Emre Kutalmış Ateşli (TUR)	2
