= Taekwondo at the 2015 Pan American Games – Men's +80 kg =

Taekwondo – Men's +80 kg at the 2015 Pan American Games
- Venue: Mississauga Sports Centre
- Dates: July 22
- Competitors: 13 from 13 nations

Medalists
Gold medal	Rafael Alba	Cuba
Silver medal	Carlos Rivas	Venezuela
Bronze medal	Marc-Andre Bergeron	Canada
Bronze medal	Philip Yun	United States

The men's +80 kg competition of the taekwondo events at the 2015 Pan American Games took place on July 22 at the Mississauga Sports Centre. The defending Pan American Games champion was Robelis Despaigne of Cuba.

== Qualification ==
All athletes qualified through the qualification tournament held in March 2015 in Mexico, while host nation Canada was permitted to enter one athlete.

== Schedule ==
All times are Eastern Daylight Time (UTC-4).

Date	Time	Round
July 22, 2015	14:20	Preliminaries
July 22, 2015	15:20	Quarterfinals
July 22, 2015	16:20	Semifinals
July 22, 2015	20:20	Repechage
July 22, 2015	20:50	Bronze medal matches/Final

== Results ==
=== Main bracket ===
The final results were:

Preliminary round
Kenneth Edwards (JAM)	0
Philip Yun (USA)	7
Braian Elliot (URU)	11
Douglas Townsend (ISV)	2
Victor Feliz (DOM)	5
Misael Lopez (MEX)	18
Martin Sio (ARG)	8
Leonardo Zamora (CHI)	5
Moises Molinares (COL)	1
Carlos Rivas (VEN)	14

Quarter-finals
Rafael Alba (CUB)	15
Philip Yun (USA)	3
Braian Elliot (URU)	2
Misael Lopez (MEX)	3
Guilherme Cezario (BRA)	2
Martin Sio (ARG)	4
Carlos Rivas (VEN)	4
Marc-Andre Bergeron (CAN)	1

Semi-finals
Rafael Alba (CUB)	8
Misael Lopez (MEX)	5
Martin Sio (ARG)	9
Carlos Rivas (VEN)	10

Gold medal match
Rafael Alba (CUB)	11
Carlos Rivas (VEN)	4

=== Repechage ===
Semifinal			Bronze medal match
			1	Misael Lopez (MEX)	7
2	Marc-Andre Bergeron (CAN)	9		Marc-Andre Bergeron (CAN)	8
3	Moises Molinares (COL)	2

Bronze medal match
Philip Yun (USA)	9
Martin Sio (ARG)	2
