= Taekwondo at the 2023 Pan American Games – Men's +80 kg =

Men's +80 kg at the 2023 Pan American Games
- Venue: Contact Sports Center
- Start date: October 23, 2023
- End date: October 23, 2023
- Competitors: 12 from 11 nations

Medalists
Gold medal	Carlos Sansores	Mexico
Silver medal	Jonathan Healy	United States
Bronze medal	Agustín Alves	Argentina
Bronze medal	Marc-André Bergeron	Canada

The men's +80 kg competition of the taekwondo events at the 2023 Pan American Games in Santiago, Chile, was held on October 23 at the Contact Sports Center. A total of 12 athletes from 11 NOC's competed.

== Qualification ==
The host nation, Chile, automatically qualified automatically and the quotas spots were awarded at the qualification tournament held in Rio de Janeiro in March 2023. The final quota spots were awarded as wildcards (if applicable).

== Results ==
=== Bracket ===
Round of 16
Guillermo Pérez Cervantes (CUB)	0
Julio Cesar Arroyo (ECU)	2
Luis Álvarez (VEN)	2
Miguel Ferrera (HON)	0
Dallas Parker (USA)	0
Luis Soto (COL)	2
Agustín Alves (ARG)	2
Chioke Holder (BAR)	0

Quarterfinals
Carlos Sansores (MEX)	2
Julio Cesar Arroyo (ECU)	0
Luis Álvarez (VEN)	0
Marc-André Bergeron (CAN)	2
Jonathan Healy (USA)	2
Luis Soto (COL)	0
Agustín Alves (ARG)	2
Maicon Andrade (BRA)	1

Semifinals
Carlos Sansores (MEX)	2
Marc-André Bergeron (CAN)	1
Jonathan Healy (USA)	2
Agustín Alves (ARG)	0

Gold medal match
Carlos Sansores (MEX)	2
Jonathan Healy (USA)	1

=== Repechage ===
Bronze medal match
Agustín Alves (ARG)	2
Julio Cesar Arroyo (ECU)	0

Bronze medal match
Marc-André Bergeron (CAN)	2
Luis Soto (COL)	1
