= 2023 World Taekwondo Championships – Men's middleweight =

Taekwondo competitions

Men's middleweight at the 2023 World Championships
- Venue: Baku Crystal Hall
- Dates: 31 May 2023
- Competitors: 43 from 41 nations

Medalists
gold medal	Kang Sang-hyun	South Korea
silver medal	Ivan Šapina	Croatia
bronze medal	Arian Salimi	Iran
bronze medal	Artsiom Plonis	Individual Neutral Athletes

The men's middleweight is a competition featured at the 2023 World Taekwondo Championships, and was held at the Baku Crystal Hall in Baku, Azerbaijan on 31 May 2023. Middleweights were limited to a maximum of 87 kilograms in body mass.

== Results ==
Legend

- DQ — Won by disqualification
- P — Won by punitive declaration
- W — Won by withdrawal

=== Finals ===
Semifinals				Final
Kang Sang-hyun (KOR)	9	16	7
Arian Salimi (IRI)	6	16	6	Kang Sang-hyun (KOR)	6	9
Artsiom Plonis (AIN)	9	2	1	Ivan Šapina (CRO)	5	7
Ivan Šapina (CRO)	3	4	15^{P}

=== Top half ===
==== Section 1 ====
Round of 64
Gulshan Sharma (IND)	8	8
Niraj Deuba (NEP)	3	5
Ozdjan Pashaev (GEO)	3	6
Ethienne Brunet (CAN)	6	13
Luis Soto (COL)	1	3
Huang Yu-jen (TPE)	2	9

Round of 32
Ícaro Miguel Soares (BRA)	4	1
Gulshan Sharma (IND)	0	0
Kang Sang-hyun (KOR)	6	9	9
Soufiane El-Asbi (MAR)	4	11	6
Patrik Divkovič (SLO)	4	3
Ethienne Brunet (CAN)	11	4
Huang Yu-jen (TPE)	1	3	4
Ahmad Rawy (EGY)	0	5	6

Round of 16
Ícaro Miguel Soares (BRA)	1	2
Kang Sang-hyun (KOR)	11	3
Ethienne Brunet (CAN)	7	2	8
Ahmad Rawy (EGY)	3	6	14

Quarterfinals
Kang Sang-hyun (KOR)	11	4	0
Ahmad Rawy (EGY)	11	3	0

==== Section 2 ====
Round of 64
Ahmed Al-Muwallad (KSA)	0	4
Seydou Gbané (CIV)	3	4
Manuel Pollet (BEL)	7	8	10
Laurenţiu Snacov (ROU)	10	1	3

Round of 32
Bryan Salazar (MEX)	1	1	3
Seydou Gbané (CIV)	0	1	0
Arian Salimi (IRI)	0	9	6
Raúl Martínez (ESP)	5	5	5
Michael Rodriguez (USA)	13	8
Arash Mozhdeh (AUS)	5	3
Manuel Pollet (BEL)	0	8
Taleh Suleymanov (AZE)	3	9

Round of 16
Bryan Salazar (MEX)	1	4
Arian Salimi (IRI)	8	10
Michael Rodriguez (USA)	4	4
Taleh Suleymanov (AZE)	0	4

Quarterfinals
Arian Salimi (IRI)	12	12
Michael Rodriguez (USA)	8	8

=== Bottom half ===
==== Section 3 ====
Round of 64
Fred Gwali (SOL)	2	0
Hassan Amer Ali (DEN)	4	12
Manuel Martinho (POR)	0	6
Vasileios Tholiotis (GRE)	10	7
Paivou Gomis (GBS)	0	1
Artsiom Plonis (AIN)	12	9

Round of 32
Mehdi Khodabakhshi (SRB)	0	7
Hassan Amer Ali (DEN)	0	2
Rafael Kamalov (AIN)	1	2	0
Roberto Botta (ITA)	1	2	1^{DQ}
Smaiyl Duisebay (KAZ)	5	7
Vasileios Tholiotis (GRE)	2	5
Artsiom Plonis (AIN)	11	7
Meng Mingkuan (CHN)	8	4

Round of 16
Mehdi Khodabakhshi (SRB)	W
Roberto Botta (ITA)
Smaiyl Duisebay (KAZ)	1	3
Artsiom Plonis (AIN)	1	5

Quarterfinals
Mehdi Khodabakhshi (SRB)	2	4
Artsiom Plonis (AIN)	6	4

==== Section 4 ====
Round of 64
Karol Robak (POL)	21	12
Jahn Estrada (PUR)	9	0
Motaz Ifaoui (TUN)	6	14
Otgonjargalyn Azkhüü (MGL)	2	2
Andreas Theocharous (CYP)	14	17^{P}	12
Ashraf Shukran (AFG)	19	9	6

Round of 32
Nikita Rafalovich (UZB)	10	13
Karol Robak (POL)	2	3
Motaz Ifaoui (TUN)	6	9	3
Fahed Ammar Sbeihi (JOR)	15	7	3
Enbiya Taha Biçer (TUR)	7	10
Dinko Šegedin (BIH)	3	6
Andreas Theocharous (CYP)	5	2
Ivan Šapina (CRO)	13	11

Round of 16
Nikita Rafalovich (UZB)	6	11
Fahed Ammar Sbeihi (JOR)	4	0
Enbiya Taha Biçer (TUR)	7	1	3
Ivan Šapina (CRO)	7	12^{P}	4

Quarterfinals
Nikita Rafalovich (UZB)	3	2	0
Ivan Šapina (CRO)	6	2	1
