= Divković =

Divković is a surname. Notable people with the surname include:

- Marko Divković (born 1999), Croatian footballer
- Matija Divković (1563–1631), Bosnian Franciscan

== See also ==
- Divkovič
