= Taekwondo at the 2023 European Games – Men's +87 kg =

Taekwondo competition

Men's +87 kg at the 2023 European Games
- Venue: Krynica-Zdrój Arena
- Date: 26 June
- Competitors: 16 from 16 nations

Medalists
gold medal	Caden Cunningham	Great Britain
silver medal	Dejan Georgievski	North Macedonia
bronze medal	Emre Kutalmış Ateşli	Turkey
bronze medal	Paško Božić	Croatia

The men's +87 kg competition in taekwondo at the 2023 European Games took place on 26 June at the Krynica-Zdrój Arena.

== Schedule ==
All times are Central European Summer Time (UTC+2).

Date	Time	Event
Monday, 26 June 2023	09:12	Round of 16
Monday, 26 June 2023	14:12	Quarterfinals
Monday, 26 June 2023	15:48	Semifinals
Monday, 26 June 2023	16:36	Repechage
Monday, 26 June 2023	19:12	Bronze medal bouts
Monday, 26 June 2023	20:36	Final

== Results ==
Round of 16
Emre Kutalmış Ateşli (TUR)	10	9
Dragoș Marinescu (MDA)	1	1
Milos Pilipovic (NOR)	0	3
Caden Cunningham (GBR)	12	16
Paško Božić (CRO)	12	12
Marc Lenkewitz (GER)	0	0
Andreas Stylianou (CYP)	WD
Mikołaj Szaferski (POL)
Iván García (ESP)	5	4
Sotirios Michopoulos (GRE)	2	1
Bryan Zonderop (NED)	11	8
Ivan Trajkovič (SLO)	4	6
Omar El Yazidi (FRA)	3	1
Andrii Harbar (UKR)	6	5
Mattia Molin (ITA)	1	3
Dejan Georgievski (MKD)	14	7

Quarterfinals
Emre Kutalmış Ateşli (TUR)	2	1
Caden Cunningham (GBR)	4	9
Paško Božić (CRO)	10	13
Mikołaj Szaferski (POL)	5	5
Iván García (ESP)	2	4	10
Bryan Zonderop (NED)	3	0	8
Andrii Harbar (UKR)	4	0	14
Dejan Georgievski (MKD)	2	7	16

Semifinals
Caden Cunningham (GBR)	3	3
Paško Božić (CRO)	2	3
Iván García (ESP)	2	3
Dejan Georgievski (MKD)	4	8

Final
Caden Cunningham (GBR)	4	13
Dejan Georgievski (MKD)	0	2

=== Repechage ===
Repechage				Bronze medal bout
				Iván García (ESP)	3	2
Emre Kutalmış Ateşli (TUR)	4	6	6	Emre Kutalmış Ateşli (TUR)	4	5
Milos Pilipovic (NOR)	5	2	2
Mattia Molin (ITA)	2	1
Andrii Harbar (UKR)	7	5		Andrii Harbar (UKR)	0	1
				Paško Božić (CRO)	5	5
