= Kang Sang-hyun =

South Korean taekwondo practitioner (born 2002)

Personal information
- Nationality: South Korean
- Born: 1 September 2002 (age 24)

Sport
- Country: South Korea
- Sport: Taekwondo
- Events: Middleweight; Heavyweight
Medal record
Men's taekwondo
Representing South Korea
World Championships
Gold medal – first place	2023 Baku	87 kg
Gold medal – first place	2025 Wuxi	+87 kg
Asian Games
Bronze medal – third place	2026 Aichi-Nagoya	+80 kg
Asian Championships
Bronze medal – third place	2026 Ulaanbaatar	+87 kg
World University Games
Gold medal – first place	2025 Rhine-Ruhr	+87 kg
Gold medal – first place	2025 Rhine-Ruhr	Team Kyorugi

Kang Sang-hyun (born 1 September 2002) is a South Korean taekwondo practitioner. He has competed as a middleweight and heavyweight and is a two-time medalist, including gold, at the World Taekwondo Championships.

== Career ==
In May 2023, Kang won the gold medal in the men's middleweight event at the World Championships in Baku after defeating Croatian Ivan Šapina in the final. It was South Korea's first World Championship middleweight gold in 15 years since Oh Seon-taek won gold at the 2005 World Championships in Madrid. In October 2023, he won the bronze medal in the +80 kg class at the Grand Prix in Taiyuan.

In 2025, Kang represented South Korea at the 2025 Summer World University Games in Rhine–Ruhr, Germany, where he won the gold medal in the men's +87 kg event, defeating Marat Mavlonov (Uzbekistan) in the final. He also won the gold medal in the Team Kyorugi event. He won the gold medal in the men's heavyweight event at the 2025 World Taekwondo Championships held in Wuxi, China.
