= Taekwondo at the 2018 Asian Games – Men's +80 kg =

Taekwondo competition

Men's +80 kg at the 2018 Asian Games
- Venue: Jakarta Convention Center
- Date: 21 August 2018
- Competitors: 15 from 15 nations

Medalists
gold medal	Saeid Rajabi	Iran
silver medal	Dmitriy Shokin	Uzbekistan
bronze medal	Hamza Kattan	Jordan
bronze medal	Ruslan Zhaparov	Kazakhstan

The men's heavyweight (+80 kilograms) event at the 2018 Asian Games took place on 21 August 2018 at Jakarta Convention Center Plenary Hall, Jakarta, Indonesia.

A total of fifteen competitors from fifteen countries competed in this event, limited to fighters whose body weight was more than 80 kilograms.

Saeid Rajabi from Iran won the gold medal after defeating the former world champion Dmitriy Shokin from Uzbekistan in the gold medal match in the golden round by the score of 3–2. Dmitriy Shokin was also a silver medalist from the previous edition in Incheon, South Korea.

Rajabi won Iran's first ever gold medal in this heavyweight event at the history of the Asian Games.

The bronze medal was shared by semifinal losers (without having a third place match) Hamza Kattan of Jordan and Ruslan Zhaparov from Kazakhstan.

== Schedule ==
All times are Western Indonesia Time (UTC+07:00)

Date	Time	Event
Tuesday, 21 August 2018	09:00	Round of 16
Tuesday, 21 August 2018	09:00	Quarterfinals
Tuesday, 21 August 2018	15:00	Semifinals
Tuesday, 21 August 2018	15:00	Final

== Results ==
Round of 16
Sheron Fernando (SRI)	8
Akshay Kumar (IND)	13
Rizky Anugrah Prasetyo (INA)	3
Yang Tsung-yeh (TPE)	23
Tan Yen Ming (MAS)	7
Hamza Kattan (JOR)	17
Saeid Rajabi (IRI)	6
Lee Seung-hwan (KOR)	3
Kristopher Uy (PHI)	7
Sun Hongyi (CHN)	9
Nattapat Tantramart (THA)	12
Tenzin Lhendup (BHU)	1
Anoj Pujari (NEP)	0
Ruslan Zhaparov (KAZ)	21

Quarterfinals
Dmitriy Shokin (UZB)	15
Akshay Kumar (IND)	1
Yang Tsung-yeh (TPE)	12
Hamza Kattan (JOR)	24
Saeid Rajabi (IRI)	5
Sun Hongyi (CHN)	4
Nattapat Tantramart (THA)	15
Ruslan Zhaparov (KAZ)	30

Semifinals
Dmitriy Shokin (UZB)	5
Hamza Kattan (JOR)	4
Saeid Rajabi (IRI)	11
Ruslan Zhaparov (KAZ)	7

Final
Dmitriy Shokin (UZB)	2
Saeid Rajabi (IRI)	3
