= Taekwondo at the 2019 Pan American Games – Men's +80 kg =

Taekwondo – Men's +80 kg at the 2019 Pan American Games
- Venue: Polideportivo Callao
- Dates: July 29
- Competitors: 15 from 15 nations

Medalists
Gold medal	Jonathan Healy; United States
Silver medal	Rafael Alba; Cuba
Bronze medal	Carlos Sansores; Mexico
Bronze medal	Maicon Andrade; Brazil

The men's +80 kg competition of the taekwondo events at the 2019 Pan American Games took place on July 29 at the Polideportivo Callao.

== Results ==
=== Main bracket ===
The final results were:

Preliminary round
Fernando Baeza (CHI)	25
Jesús Perea (ECU)	27
Carlos Sansores (MEX)	12
Luis Álvarez (VEN)	8
Juan Álvarez (PUR)	21
Christian Ocampo (PER)	1
Maicon Andrade (BRA)	19
Stuart Smit (ARU)	6
Askia Alleyne (BAR)	4
Jordan Stewart (CAN)	24
Martin Sio (ARG)	24
Fraily Mora (DOM)	10
Yorman Montalvo (COL)	7
Jonathan Healy (USA)	11

Quarterfinals
Rafael Alba (CUB)	21
Jesús Perea (ECU)	7
Carlos Sansores (MEX)	15
Juan Álvarez (PUR)	4
Maicon Andrade (BRA)	14
Jordan Stewart (CAN)	4
Martin Sio (ARG)	12
Jonathan Healy (USA)	18

Semifinals
Rafael Alba (CUB)	33
Carlos Sansores (MEX)	25
Maicon Andrade (BRA)	4
Jonathan Healy (USA)	9

Gold medal match
Rafael Alba (CUB)	6
Jonathan Healy (USA)	13

=== Repechage ===
Semifinal			Bronze medal match
			1	Carlos Sansores (MEX)	17
2	Martin Sio (ARG)	17		Martin Sio (ARG)	13
3	Yorman Montalvo (COL)	11

Bronze medal match
Jesús Perea (ECU)	4
Maicon Andrade (BRA)	15
