= Taekwondo at the 2026 Asian Games – Men's +80 kg =

Taekwondo competition

Men's +80 kg at the 2026 Asian Games
- Venue: Toyohashi City General Gymnasium
- Date: 3 October 2026
- Competitors: 13 from 13 nations

Medalists
| gold medal | Arian Salimi | Iran |
| silver medal | Marat Mavlonov | Uzbekistan |
| bronze medal | Mohammad Al-Adarbi | Jordan |
| bronze medal | Kang Sang-hyun | South Korea |

The men's 80 kilograms event at the 2026 Asian Games took place on 3 October 2026 at Toyohashi City General Gymnasium, Toyohashi, Japan.

Each bout consisted of up to three rounds, lasting two minutes apiece. The athlete who scored more points in each round was the winner of that round; the bout finished when one athlete had won two rounds (and thus the match).

Arian Salimi from Iran won the gold medal.

== Schedule ==
All times are Japan Standard Time (UTC+09:00)

| Date | Time | Event |
|---|---|---|
| Saturday, 3 October 2026 | 09:00 | Round of 16 |
| Saturday, 3 October 2026 | 09:00 | Quarterfinals |
| Saturday, 3 October 2026 | 14:30 | Semifinals |
| Saturday, 3 October 2026 | 14:30 | Gold medal contest |

== Results ==
Round of 16
Mohammad Al-Adarbi (JOR) | 8 | 5
Hidenori Ebata (JPN) | 1 | 2
Beibarys Kablan (KAZ) | 9 | 8
Ali Akbar Amiri (AFG) | 4 | 2
Trần Hồ Nhân Văn (VIE) | 6 | 12
Tang Hao (CHN) | 16 | 18
Huang Yu-jen (TPE) | 9 | 16
Syafiq Zuber (MAS) | 0 | 12
Jack Woody Mercer (THA) | 4 | 7
Hamzah Omar Saeed (PAK) | 2 | 5

Quarterfinals
Mohammad Al-Adarbi (JOR) | 6 | 9 | 4
Beibarys Kablan (KAZ) | 7 | 6 | 3
Tang Hao (CHN) | 10 | 4
Arian Salimi (IRI) | 19 | 14
Marat Mavlonov (UZB) | 4 | 12 | 11
Huang Yu-jen (TPE) | 14 | 8 | 9
Jack Woody Mercer (THA) | 2 | 0
Kang Sang-hyun (KOR) | 17 | 15

Semifinals
Mohammad Al-Adarbi (JOR) | 2 | 2
Arian Salimi (IRI) | 15 | 13
Marat Mavlonov (UZB) | 15 | 8
Kang Sang-hyun (KOR) | 8 | 8

Gold medal contest
Arian Salimi (IRI) | 26 | 20
Marat Mavlonov (UZB) | 4 | 8
