= 2023 World Taekwondo Grand Prix =

Taekwondo competition

The 2023 World Taekwondo Grand Prix is the 9th edition of the World Taekwondo Grand Prix series.

== Schedule ==
Event	Date	Venue	Ref.
Series 1	June 9–11	Rome, Italy	
Series 2	September 1–3	Paris, France	
Series 3	October 10-12	Taiyuan, China	
Final	December 2–3	Manchester, United Kingdom	

== Men ==
=== 58 kg ===
Event	Gold	Silver	Bronze
Rome	Adrián Vicente (ESP)	Mehdi Haji Mousaei (IRI)	Jang Jun (KOR)
Rome	Adrián Vicente (ESP)	Mehdi Haji Mousaei (IRI)	Abolfazl Zandi (IRI)
Paris	Mehdi Haji Mousaei (IRI)	Abolfazl Zandi (IRI)	Bailey Lewis (AUS)
Paris	Mehdi Haji Mousaei (IRI)	Abolfazl Zandi (IRI)	Mohamed Khalil Jendoubi (TUN)
Taiyuan	Mohamed Khalil Jendoubi (TUN)	Jang Jun (KOR)	Park Tae-joon (KOR)
Taiyuan	Mohamed Khalil Jendoubi (TUN)	Jang Jun (KOR)	Adrián Vicente (ESP)
Manchester	Vito Dell'Aquila (ITA)	Adrián Vicente (ESP)	Hugo Arillo (ESP)

=== 68 kg ===
Event	Gold	Silver	Bronze
Rome	Ulugbek Rashitov (UZB)	Levente Józsa (HUN)	Marko Golubić (CRO)
Rome	Ulugbek Rashitov (UZB)	Levente Józsa (HUN)	Konstantinos Chamalidis (GRE)
Paris	Ulugbek Rashitov (UZB)	Edival Pontes (BRA)	Marko Golubić (CRO)
Paris	Ulugbek Rashitov (UZB)	Edival Pontes (BRA)	Zaid Al-Halawani (JOR)
Taiyuan	Jin Ho-jun (KOR)	Souleyman Alaphilippe (FRA)	Ulugbek Rashitov (UZB)
Taiyuan	Jin Ho-jun (KOR)	Souleyman Alaphilippe (FRA)	Javier Pérez (ESP)
Manchester	Levente Józsa (HUN)	Javier Pérez (ESP)	Zaid Kareem (JOR)

=== 80 kg ===
Event	Gold	Silver	Bronze
Rome	Saleh El-Sharabaty (JOR)	Mehran Barkhordari (IRI)	Seo Geon-woo (KOR)
Rome	Saleh El-Sharabaty (JOR)	Mehran Barkhordari (IRI)	Richard Ordemann (NOR)
Paris	Mehran Barkhordari (IRI)	Apostolos Telikostoglou (GRE)	Carl Nickolas (USA)
Paris	Mehran Barkhordari (IRI)	Apostolos Telikostoglou (GRE)	Muhammed Emin Yıldız (TUR)
Taiyuan	Firas Katoussi (TUN)	Seo Geon-woo (KOR)	Carl Nickolas (USA)
Taiyuan	Firas Katoussi (TUN)	Seo Geon-woo (KOR)	Jasurbek Jaysunov (UZB)
Manchester	Seo Geon-woo (KOR)	Seif Eissa (EGY)	Carl Nickolas (USA)

=== +80 kg ===
Event	Gold	Silver	Bronze
Rome	Caden Cunningham (GBR)	Nikita Rafalovich (UZB)	Song Zhaoxiang (CHN)
Rome	Caden Cunningham (GBR)	Nikita Rafalovich (UZB)	Ivan Šapina (CRO)
Paris	Cheick Sallah Cissé (CIV)	Caden Cunningham (GBR)	Paško Božić (CRO)
Paris	Cheick Sallah Cissé (CIV)	Caden Cunningham (GBR)	Carlos Sansores (MEX)
Taiyuan	Vladislav Larin (AIN)	Nikita Rafalovich (UZB)	Kang Sang-hyun (KOR)
Taiyuan	Vladislav Larin (AIN)	Nikita Rafalovich (UZB)	Ivan Šapina (CRO)
Manchester	Cheick Sallah Cissé (CIV)	Maicon Andrade (BRA)	Iván García (ESP)

== Women ==
=== 49 kg ===
Event	Gold	Silver	Bronze
Rome	Panipak Wongpattanakit (THA)	Adriana Cerezo (ESP)	Mobina Nematzadeh (IRI)
Rome	Panipak Wongpattanakit (THA)	Adriana Cerezo (ESP)	Guo Qing (CHN)
Paris	Merve Dinçel (TUR)	Adriana Cerezo (ESP)	Wang Xiaolu (CHN)
Paris	Merve Dinçel (TUR)	Adriana Cerezo (ESP)	Mobina Nematzadeh (IRI)
Taiyuan	Panipak Wongpattanakit (THA)	Guo Qing (CHN)	Madinabonu Mannopova (UZB)
Taiyuan	Panipak Wongpattanakit (THA)	Guo Qing (CHN)	Kang Mi-reu (KOR)
Manchester	Panipak Wongpattanakit (THA)	Adriana Cerezo (ESP)	Merve Dinçel (TUR)

=== 57 kg ===
Event	Gold	Silver	Bronze
Rome	Jade Jones (GBR)	Nahid Kiani (IRI)	Faith Dillon (USA)
Rome	Jade Jones (GBR)	Nahid Kiani (IRI)	Kim Yu-jin (KOR)
Paris	Jade Jones (GBR)	Luo Zongshi (CHN)	Hatice Kübra İlgün (TUR)
Paris	Jade Jones (GBR)	Luo Zongshi (CHN)	Aaliyah Powell (GBR)
Taiyuan	Skylar Park (CAN)	Nahid Kiani (IRI)	Lee Ah-reum (KOR)
Taiyuan	Skylar Park (CAN)	Nahid Kiani (IRI)	Tatiana Minina (AIN)
Manchester	Luo Zongshi (CHN)	Faith Dillon (USA)	Aaliyah Powell (GBR)

=== 67 kg ===
Event	Gold	Silver	Bronze
Rome	Song Jie (CHN)	Sarah Chaâri (BEL)	Magda Wiet-Hénin (FRA)
Rome	Song Jie (CHN)	Sarah Chaâri (BEL)	Aya Shehata (EGY)
Paris	Zhang Mengyu (CHN)	Song Jie (CHN)	Hong Hyo-rim (KOR)
Paris	Zhang Mengyu (CHN)	Song Jie (CHN)	Magda Wiet-Hénin (FRA)
Taiyuan	Aleksandra Perišić (SRB)	Sarah Chaâri (BEL)	Elizabeth Anyanacho (NGR)
Taiyuan	Aleksandra Perišić (SRB)	Sarah Chaâri (BEL)	Julyana Al-Sadeq (JOR)
Manchester	Sarah Chaâri (BEL)	Zhang Mengyu (CHN)	Julyana Al-Sadeq (JOR)

=== +67 kg ===
Event	Gold	Silver	Bronze
Rome	Xu Lei (CHN)	Althéa Laurin (FRA)	Rebecca McGowan (GBR)
Rome	Xu Lei (CHN)	Althéa Laurin (FRA)	Zhou Zeqi (CHN)
Paris	Althéa Laurin (FRA)	Rebecca McGowan (GBR)	Sude Yaren Uzunçavdar (TUR)
Paris	Althéa Laurin (FRA)	Rebecca McGowan (GBR)	Lee Da-bin (KOR)
Taiyuan	Xu Lei (CHN)	Sude Yaren Uzunçavdar (TUR)	Lorena Brandl (GER)
Taiyuan	Xu Lei (CHN)	Sude Yaren Uzunçavdar (TUR)	Lee Da-bin (KOR)
Manchester	Lee Da-bin (KOR)	Rebecca McGowan (GBR)	Althéa Laurin (FRA)

== Medal table ==
Rank	Nation	Gold	Silver	Bronze	Total
1	China	5	4	4	13
2	Great Britain	3	3	3	9
3	South Korea	3	2	10	15
4	Thailand	3	0	0	3
5	Iran	2	5	3	10
6	Uzbekistan	2	2	3	7
7	Tunisia	2	0	1	3
8	Ivory Coast	2	0	0	2
9	Spain	1	5	4	10
10	France	1	2	3	6
11	Belgium	1	2	0	3
12	Turkey	1	1	4	6
13	Hungary	1	1	0	2
14	Jordan	1	0	4	5
–	Individual Neutral Athletes ^{a}	1	0	1	2
15	Canada	1	0	0	1
15	Italy	1	0	0	1
15	Serbia	1	0	0	1
18	Brazil	0	2	0	2
19	United States	0	1	4	5
20	Egypt	0	1	1	2
20	Greece	0	1	1	2
22	Croatia	0	0	5	5
23	Australia	0	0	1	1
23	Germany	0	0	1	1
23	Mexico	0	0	1	1
23	Nigeria	0	0	1	1
23	Norway	0	0	1	1
Totals (27 entries)		32	32	56	120

== Russian and Belarusian participation ==
a In accordance with sanctions imposed following by the 2022 Russian invasion of Ukraine, taekwondo athletes from Russia and Belarus were not permitted to use the name, flag, or anthem of Russia or Belarus. They instead participated as "Individual Neutral Athletes (AIN)", their medals were not included in the official medal table.
