= Hamza Kattan =

Jordan taekwondo practitioner

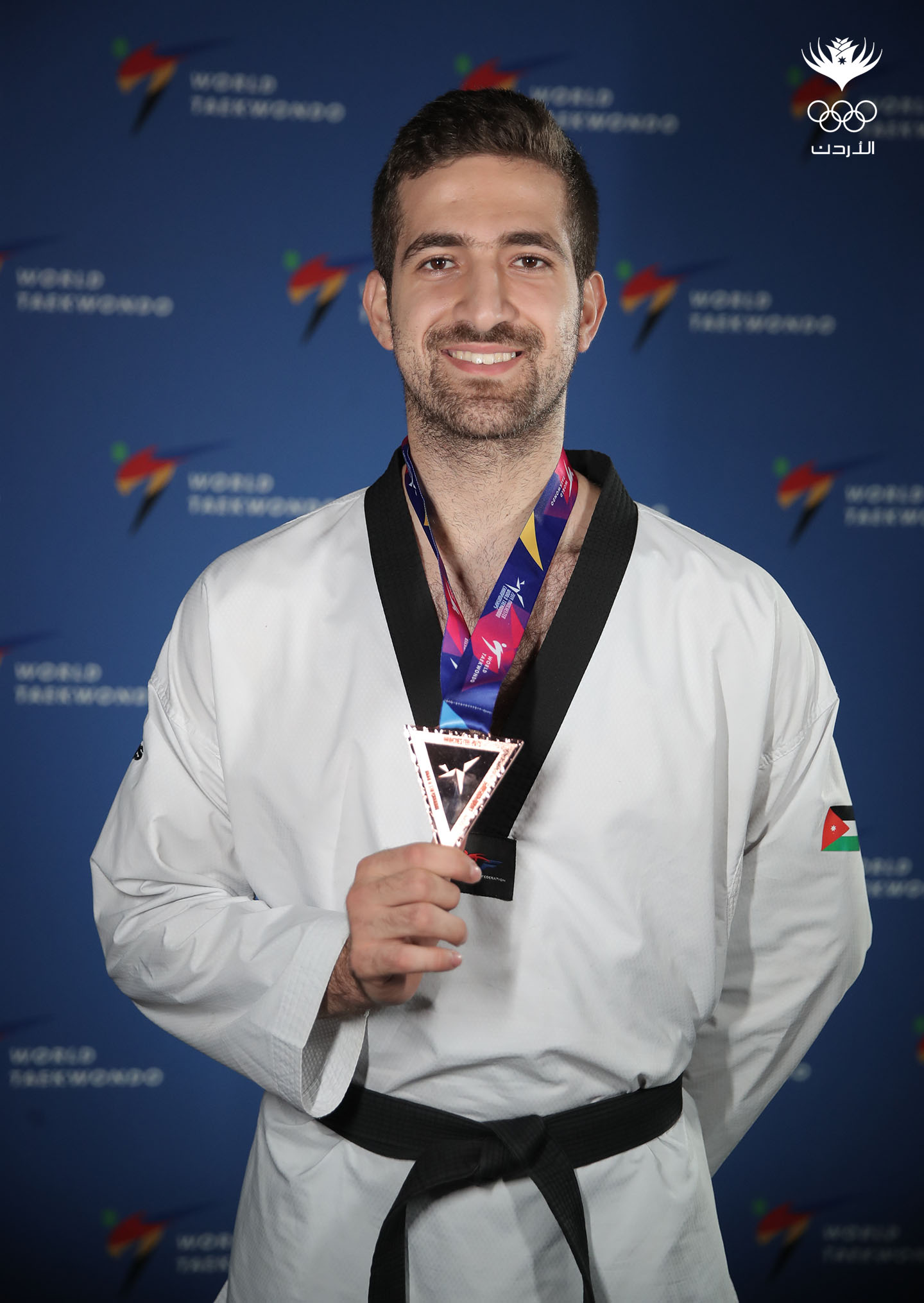
- Hamza Kattan (2019)

Personal information
- Born: 19 April 1997 (age 29)

Sport
- Country: Jordan
- Sport: Taekwondo
Medal record
Representing Jordan
Men's taekwondo
World Championships
Bronze medal – third place	2019 Manchester	Heavyweight
Asian Games
Bronze medal – third place	2018 Jakarta–Palembang	+80 kg

Hamza Kattan (Arabic: حمزة قطان) (born 19 April 1997) is a Jordan taekwondo practitioner. In 2019, he won a bronze medal in the men's heavyweight (87+ kg) event at the 2019 World Taekwondo Championships held in Manchester, United Kingdom.

At the 2018 Asian Games held in Jakarta, Indonesia, he won one of the bronze medals in the men's +80 kg event.
