= Taekwondo at the 2023 European Games – Men's 87 kg =

Taekwondo competition

Men's 87 kg at the 2023 European Games
- Venue: Krynica-Zdrój Arena
- Date: 26 June
- Competitors: 13 from 13 nations

Medalists
gold medal	Ivan Šapina	Croatia
silver medal	Patrik Divković	Slovenia
bronze medal	Raúl Martínez	Spain
bronze medal	Kelen Bailey	Hungary

The men's 87 kg competition in taekwondo at the 2023 European Games took place on 26 June at the Krynica-Zdrój Arena.

== Schedule ==
All times are Central European Summer Time (UTC+2).

Date	Time	Event
Monday, 26 June 2023	09:36	Round of 16
Monday, 26 June 2023	14:12	Quarterfinals
Monday, 26 June 2023	15:48	Semifinals
Monday, 26 June 2023	19:12	Bronze medal bouts
Monday, 26 June 2023	20:12	Final

== Results ==
Round of 16
Vasileios Tholiotis (GRE)	11	16
Dinko Šegedin (BIH)	4	3
Enbiya Taha Biçer (TUR)	10	15
Andreas Theocharous (CYP)	1	2
Laurenţiu Snacov (ROU)	6
Karol Robak (POL)	16	WD
Alexander Bachmann (GER)	0	10	4
Taleh Suleymanov (AZE)	6	4	1
Vladyslav Bondar (UKR)	10	12	4
Kelen Bailey (HUN)	11	10	7

Quarterfinals
Ivan Šapina (CRO)	7	5
Vasileios Tholiotis (GRE)	4	2
Enbiya Taha Biçer (TUR)	6	12
Laurenţiu Snacov (ROU)	1	0
Raúl Martínez (ESP)	4	8
Alexander Bachmann (GER)	1	5
Kelen Bailey (HUN)	3	5
Patrik Divković (SLO)	10	7

Semifinals
Ivan Šapina (CRO)	8	10
Enbiya Taha Biçer (TUR)	6	7
Raúl Martínez (ESP)	0	3
Patrik Divković (SLO)	2	3

Final
Ivan Šapina (CRO)	8	14
Patrik Divković (SLO)	3	6

=== Repechage ===
Repechage	Bronze medal bout
	Raúl Martínez (ESP)	8	3	8
	Vasileios Tholiotis (GRE)	7	16^{P}	6
	Kelen Bailey (HUN)	9	22	15
	Enbiya Taha Biçer (TUR)	8^{P}	17	5
