= Taekwondo at the 2016 Summer Olympics – Men's +80 kg =

Taekwondo competition

Men's +80kg at the Games of the XXXI Olympiad
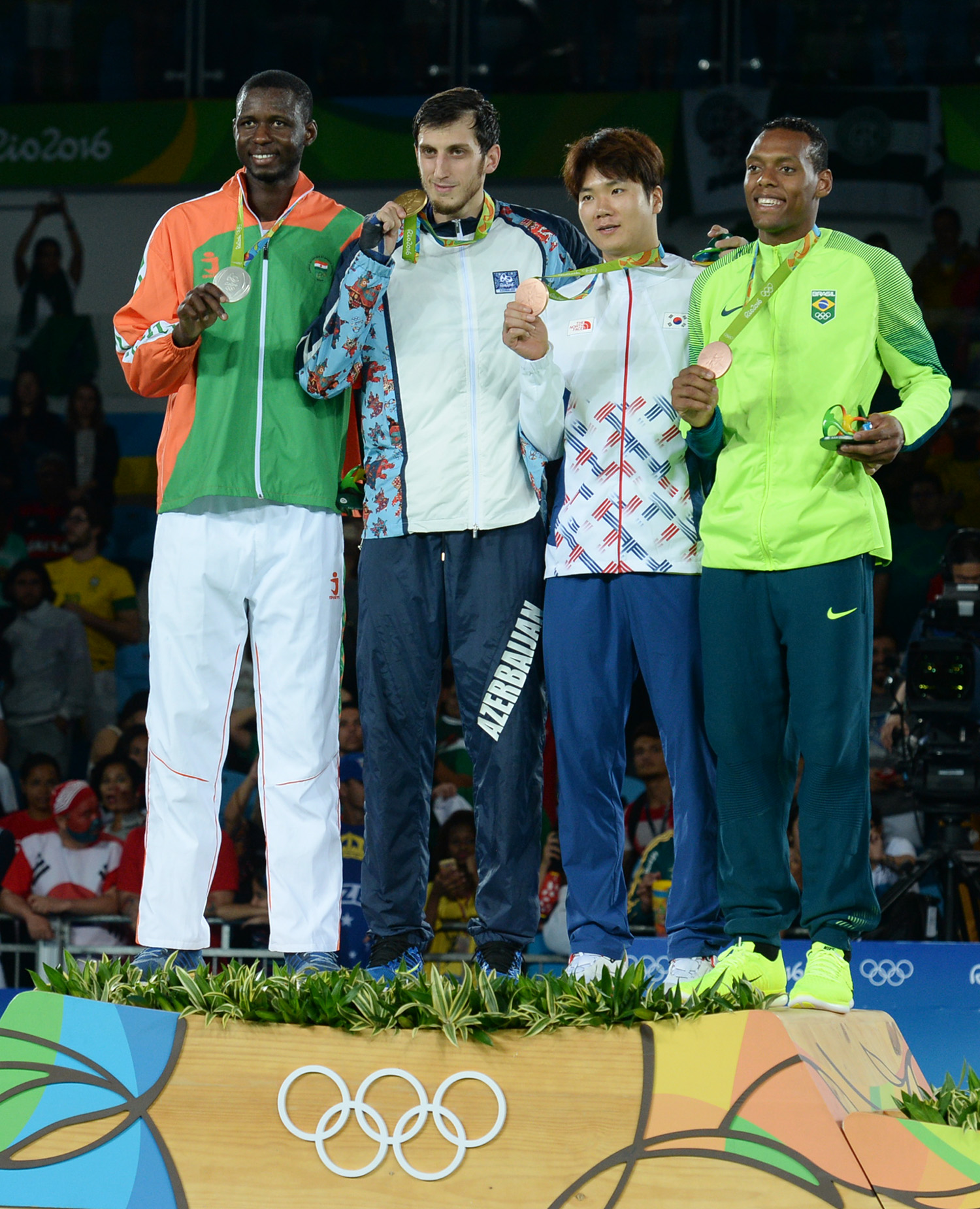
- Awarding ceremony
- Venue: Carioca Arena 3
- Date: 20 August 2016
- Competitors: 16 from 16 nations

Medalists
1st place, gold medalist(s)		Radik Isayev	Azerbaijan
2nd place, silver medalist(s)		Abdoul Issoufou	Niger
3rd place, bronze medalist(s)		Maicon Siqueira	Brazil
3rd place, bronze medalist(s)		Cha Dong-min	South Korea

The men's +80 kg competition at the 2016 Summer Olympics was held on 20 August, at the Carioca Arena 3.

The medals for the competition were presented by Nicole Hoevertsz, Aruba, IOC member and the gifts were presented by Dr. Choue Chungwon, President of the World Taekwondo Federation.

== Competition format ==
The main bracket consisted of a single elimination tournament, culminating in the gold medal match. The top eight athletes in each event were seeded so as not to face each other in the preliminary round. The remainder of the qualified athletes were drawn randomly on 15 August 2016. Two bronze medals were awarded at the Taekwondo competitions. A repechage was used to determine the bronze medal winners. Every competitor who lost to one of the two finalists competed in the repechage, another single-elimination competition. Each semifinal loser faced the last remaining repechage competitor from the opposite half of the bracket in a bronze medal match.

== Schedule ==
All times are in local time (UTC-3).

Date	Time	Round
Saturday, 20 August 2016	09:15; 15:15; 17:15; 20:15; 21:15; 22:15	Preliminary round Quarterfinals; Semifinals; Repechage; Bronze medal matches Final

== Seeds ==
Every practitioner was seeded at the event. Practitioners representing the hosting nation were seeded as no. 4 regardless of their current world ranking.

1. Dmitriy Shokin (UZB)
2. Sajjad Mardani (IRI)
3. Radik Isayev (AZE)
4. Maicon Siqueira (BRA)
5. M'bar N'diaye (FRA)
6. Cha Dong-min (KOR)
7. Anthony Obame (GAB)
8. Yassine Trabelsi (TUN)
9. Rafael Castillo (CUB)
10. Mahama Cho (GBR)
11. Arman-Marshall Silla (BLR)
12. Abdoul Razak Issoufou (NIG)
13. Stephen Lambdin (USA)
14. Ruslan Zhaparov (KAZ)
15. Pita Taufatofua (TGA)
16. Qiao Sen (CHN)

== Results ==
Legend

- DSQ – Disqualified
- PTG – Won by points gap
- SUD – Won by sudden death
- SUP – Won by Superiority

=== Main bracket ===
Preliminary round
13	Stephen Lambdin (USA)	7
4	Maicon Siqueira (BRA)	9
5	M'bar N'diaye (FRA)	0
12	Abdoul Issoufou (NIG)	6
9	Rafael Castillo (CUB)	13
8	Yassine Trabelsi (TUN)	4
1	Dmitriy Shokin (UZB)	15
16	Qiao Sen (CHN)	8
15	Pita Taufatofua (TGA)	1
2	Sajjad Mardani (IRI)	16 (PTG)
7	Anthony Obame (GAB)	6
10	Mahama Cho (GBR)	12
11	Arman-Marshall Silla (BLR)	DSQ^{1}
6	Cha Dong-min (KOR)
3	Radik Isayev (AZE)	11
14	Ruslan Zhaparov (KAZ)	2

Quarterfinals
4	Maicon Siqueira (BRA)	1
12	Abdoul Issoufou (NIG)	6
9	Rafael Castillo (CUB)	1
1	Dmitriy Shokin (UZB)	1 (SUP)
2	Sajjad Mardani (IRI)	3
10	Mahama Cho (GBR)	4 (SUD)
6	Cha Dong-min (KOR)	8
3	Radik Isayev (AZE)	12

Semifinals
12	Abdoul Issoufou (NIG)	8
1	Dmitriy Shokin (UZB)	2
10	Mahama Cho (GBR)	1
3	Radik Isayev (AZE)	4

Gold medal match
12	Abdoul Issoufou (NIG)	2
3	Radik Isayev (AZE)	6

^{1} Silla was ejected from the competition after he tested positive for melodonium prior to the Olympics.

=== Repechage ===
Repechage
M'bar N'diaye (FRA)	2
Maicon Siqueira (BRA)	5
Ruslan Zhaparov (KAZ)	8
Cha Dong-min (KOR)	15

Bronze medal matches
Mahama Cho (GBR)	4
Maicon Siqueira (BRA)	5
Cha Dong-min (KOR)	4 (SUD)
Dmitriy Shokin (UZB)	3
