= Fatih Şen =

Turkish footballer

Personal information
- Date of birth: 23 September 1984 (age 42)
- Place of birth: Beykoz near Istanbul
- Height: 1.85 m (6 ft 1 in)
- Position: Midfielder

Youth career
- –2003: Yozgatspor

Senior career*
Years	Team	Apps	(Gls)
2003–2005	Gaskispor		
2004–2005	→ Gaziantep BB (loan)		
2005–2006	Gaziantep BB	6	(0)
2006–2009	Gaziantepspor	17	(0)
2008	→ Kartalspor (loan)		
2008–2009	→ Gaziantep BB (loan)	28	(1)
2009–2010	Orduspor	30	(4)
2010–2012	Giresunspor	44	(1)
2012–2013	Karşıyaka	29	(3)
2013	Samsunspor	16	(0)
2013–2014	Boluspor	16	(1)
2014–2015	Adanaspor	25	(2)
2015	Adana Demirspor	6	(1)
2015–2016	Pendikspor	14	(0)
2016–2017	Diyarbekirspor	14	(2)
2017	Kahramanmaraşspor	12	(2)
2017–2018	Pazarspor	13	(0)
2018	Yeşil Bursa	13	(1)
2018–2019	Kırşehir FK	30	(2)
2019–2020	Cizrespor	10	(1)
2020	Kızılcabölükspor	10	(0)
2020–2021	Mersin 33 FK		
2021	Bayrampaşa	0	(0)
2021	Mersin 33 FK		
- * Club domestic league appearances and goals

Fatih Şen (born 23 September 1984) is a Turkish former professional footballer.
