= Carlos Sansores =

Mexican taekwondo practitioner

Personal information
- Full name: Carlos Adrian Sansores Acevedo
- Born: 25 June 1997 (age 29) Chetumal, Mexico

Sport
- Country: Mexico
- Sport: Taekwondo
- Weight class: +87 kg
- University team: Universidad Anáhuac México Sur
Medal record
Men's taekwondo
Representing Mexico
World Championships
Gold medal – first place	2022 Guadalajara	+87 kg
Silver medal – second place	2019 Manchester	+87 kg
Silver medal – second place	2023 Baku	+87 kg
Grand Prix
Silver medal – second place	2022 Riyadh (F)	+80 kg
Bronze medal – third place	2023 Paris	+80 kg
Pan American Games
Gold medal – first place	2023 Santiago	+80 kg
Bronze medal – third place	2019 Lima	+80 kg
Pan American Championships
Gold medal – first place	2018 Spokane	+87kg
Central American and Caribbean Games
Gold medal – first place	2026 Santo Domingo	+87 kg
Grand Slam
Silver medal – second place	2018 Wuxi	+80 kg
- Updated on 9 December 2023

Carlos Adrian Sansores Acevedo (Note: In this Spanish name, the first or paternal surname is Sansores and the second or maternal family name is Acevedo.) (born 25 June 1997) is a Mexican taekwondo athlete. He won the gold medal at the 2018 Pan American Championships on the men's heavyweights and the silver medal at the 2019 World Taekwondo Championships.

He won the silver medal in the men's heavyweight event at the 2023 World Taekwondo Championships held in Baku, Azerbaijan.

Sansores competed for Mexico at the 2020 Summer Olympics and 2024 Summer Olympics.
