= Jasur Baykuziyev =

Uzbekistani taekwondo practitioner

Sport
- Country: Uzbekistan
- Sport: Taekwondo
- Weight class: 87 kg
Medal record
Men's taekwondo
Representing Uzbekistan
World Championships
Silver medal – second place	2015 Chelyabinsk	87 kg
Asian Games
Gold medal – first place	2014 Incheon	87 kg
Asian Championships
Gold medal – first place	2014 Tashkent	87 kg
Silver medal – second place	2012 Ho Chi Minh City	87 kg
Silver medal – second place	2018 Ho Chi Minh City	87 kg
Bronze medal – third place	2016 Pasay	87 kg

Jasur Baykuziyev is an Uzbekistani taekwondo practitioner. He won the gold medal in the men's 87 kg event at the 2014 Asian Games held in Incheon, South Korea. In 2015, he won the silver medal in the men's middleweight event at the World Taekwondo Championships held in Chelyabinsk, Russia.

Baykuziyev competed in the men's 80 kg event at the 2010 Asian Games in Guangzhou, China without winning a medal. In 2016, he won one of the bronze medals in the men's −87 kg event at the 2016 Asian Taekwondo Championships in Pasay, Philippines.
