= Ivan Šapina =

Croatian taekwondo practitioner

Personal information
- Born: 17 November 1999 (age 26) Zagreb
- Height: 191 cm (6 ft 3 in)

Sport
- Country: Croatia
- Sport: Taekwondo
- Weight class: 87 kg
Medal record
Men's taekwondo
Representing Croatia
World Championships
Silver medal – second place	2023 Baku	87 kg
Bronze medal – third place	2019 Manchester	87 kg
Grand Prix
Silver medal – second place	2022 Paris	+80 kg
Bronze medal – third place	2019 Sofia	+80 kg
Bronze medal – third place	2023 Rome	+80 kg
Bronze medal – third place	2023 Taiyuan	+80 kg
European Games
Gold medal – first place	2023 Kraków-Małopolska	87 kg
European Championships
Gold medal – first place	2022 Manchester	87 kg
Bronze medal – third place	2021 Sofia	87 kg
Bronze medal – third place	2026 Munich	+87 kg
Mediterranean Games
Gold medal – first place	2022 Oran	+80 kg
Silver medal – second place	2026 Taranto	+80 kg

Ivan Šapina (born 17 November 1999) is a Croatian taekwondo practitioner. He is a two-time medalist in the men's 87 kg event at the World Taekwondo Championships. He is also a two-time medalist, including gold, in his event at the European Taekwondo Championships. He competed at the 2020 and 2024 Olympic Games.

== Career ==
He is a member of Marjan Taekwondo Club in Split, Croatia, a club that also includes fellow champion practitioners Matea Jelić, Bruna Duvančić and Lena Stojković.

Šapina won one of the bronze medals in the men's middleweight event at the 2019 World Taekwondo Championships held in Manchester, United Kingdom. In 2021, he won one of the bronze medals in the men's 87 kg event at the European Taekwondo Championships held in Sofia, Bulgaria.

Šapina represented Croatia at the delayed 2020 Summer Olympics held in Tokyo, Japan, in 2021. He competed in the men's +80 kg event where he was eliminated in his second match by Sun Hongyi of China.

Šapina won the gold medal in the men's +80 kg event at the 2022 Mediterranean Games held in Oran, Algeria. He defeated Ayoub Bassel of Morocco in his gold medal match.

He won the silver medal in the men's middleweight event at the 2023 World Taekwondo Championships held in Baku, Azerbaijan.

He competed at the 2024 Olympic Games in Paris, France, where he was defeated in the bronze medal of the men's +80 kg division match, by Rafael Alba of Cuba. He was however, given the honour of being a flag bearer for his country at the Games' closing ceremony.

== Achievements ==
Year	Event	Location	Place
2019	World Championships	Manchester, United Kingdom	3rd
2021	European Championships	Sofia, Bulgaria	3rd
2022	European Championships	Manchester, United Kingdom	1st
2022	Mediterranean Games	Oran, Algeria	1st
2023	World Championships	Baku, Azerbaijan	2nd
