= Lana Skeledžija =

Croatian sport shooter

Personal information
- Nationality: Croatian
- Born: 5 April 1982 (age 44)

Sport
- Country: Croatia
Medal record
Women's Shooting
Representing Croatia
Deaflympics
Silver medal – second place	Sofia 2013	10m air pistol

Lana Skeledžija (born 5 April 1982) is a Croatian female sport shooter. She competed at the 2013 Summer Deaflympics and in the 2017 Summer Deaflympics representing Croatia.

She claimed her first Deaflympic medal which was a silver medal in the women's air pistol event at the 2013 Summer Deaflympics. In the 2017 Summer Deaflympics, she equalled the Deaflympic record in the women's 10m air pistol qualification event held by Russia's Katorgina Evdokia.
