= Arian Salimi =

Iranian taekwondo practitioner

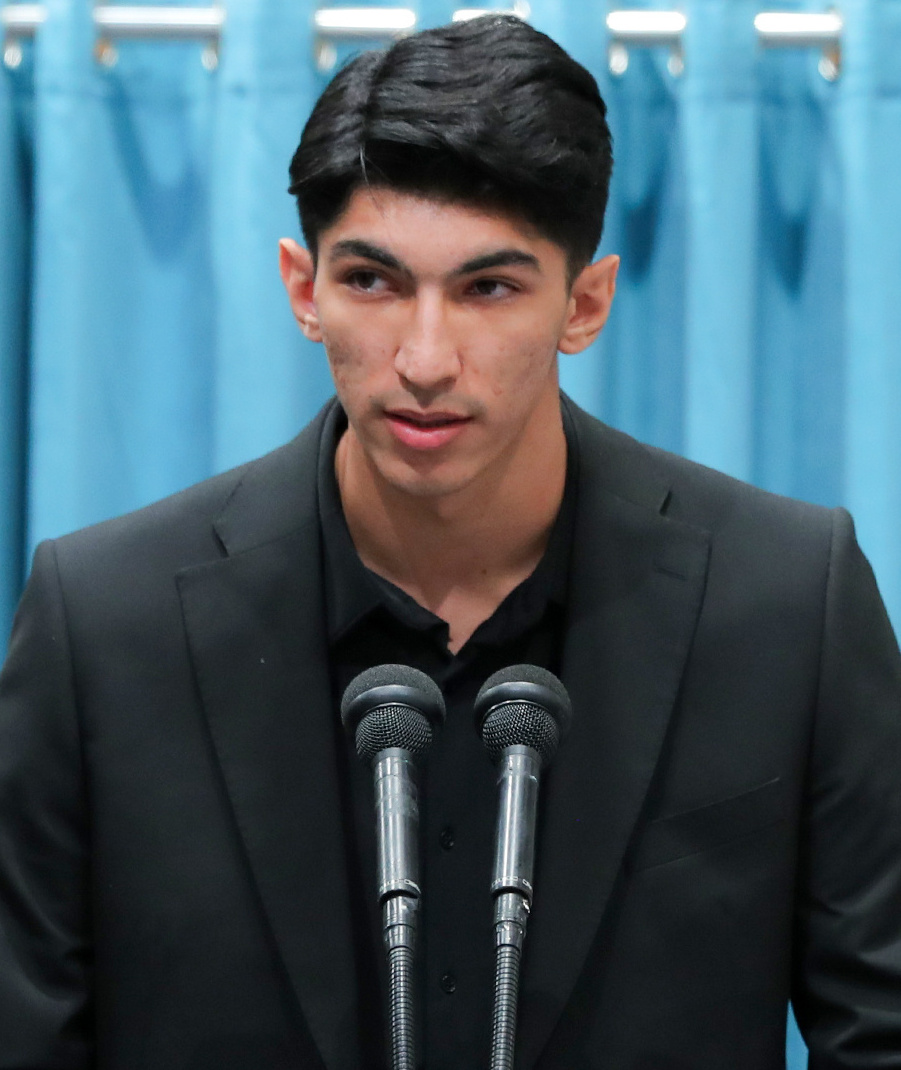
- Salimi in 2024

Personal information
- Born: 16 December 2003 (age 22) Kermanshah, Iran
- Height: 198 cm (6 ft 6 in)
- Weight: 87 kg (192 lb)
- Spouse: Kosar Asaseh

Sport
- Country: Iran
- Sport: Taekwondo
- Coached by: Majid Aflaki (National Team)
Medal record
Men's taekwondo
Representing Iran
Olympic Games
Gold medal – first place	2024 Paris	+80 kg
World Championships
Bronze medal – third place	2023 Baku	87 kg
Asian Games
Gold medal – first place	2026 Aichi-Nagoya	+80 kg
Silver medal – second place	2022 Hangzhou	+80 kg
Asian Championships
Gold medal – first place	2024 Da Nang	+87 kg
Gold medal – first place	2026 Ulaanbaatar	+87 kg
Universiade
Silver medal – second place	2021 Chengdu	87 kg

Arian Salimi (Persian: آرین سلیمی; born 16 December 2003 in Kermanshah) is an Iranian Taekwondo athlete. He won a silver medal at the 2022 Asian Games in the Men's +80 kg weight class. Salimi won the gold medal at the Paris 2024 Summer Olympic Games by defeating Caden Cunningham in the final.
