= Yassine Trabelsi =

Tunisian taekwondo practitioner

Personal information
- Nationality: Tunisian
- Born: 12 July 1990 (age 35)
- Height: 189 cm (6 ft 2 in)

Sport
- Sport: Taekwondo
Medal record
World Championships
Bronze medal – third place	2013 Puebla	Lightweight
African Games
Gold medal – first place	2015 Brazzaville	+87kg
Silver medal – second place	2011 Maputo	+87kg

Yassine Trabelsi (born 12 July 1990) is a Tunisian taekwondo athlete.

== Career ==
He represented Tunisia at the 2016 Summer Olympics in Rio de Janeiro, in the men's +80 kg.
