= Ruslan Zhaparov =

Kazakh taekwondo practitioner

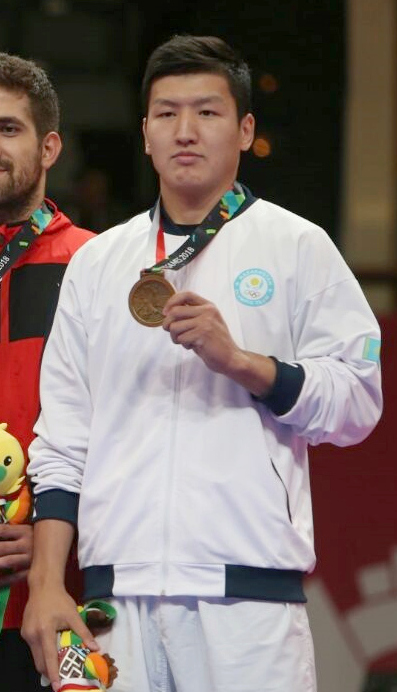
- Zhaparov at the 2018 Asian Games

Personal information
- Native name: Руслан Қайратұлы Жапаров
- Full name: Ruslan Kayratuly Zhaparov
- National team: Kazakhstan
- Born: 27 May 1996 (age 30) Taraz, Kazakhstan
- Height: 1.97 m (6 ft 6 in)
- Weight: 80 kg (176 lb)

Sport
- Country: Kazakhstan
- Sport: Taekwondo
- Event: +80 kg
- Coached by: Altynbek Musinov (personal); Yu Yong-Jin (national)
Medal record
Representing Kazakhstan
Asian Games
Bronze medal – third place	2018 Jakarta	+80 kg
Asian Championships
Silver medal – second place	2018 Ho Chi Minh City	+87 kg
Military World Games
Gold medal – first place	2019 Wuhan	+87 kg

Ruslan Kayratuly Zhaparov (Руслан Қайратұлы Жапаров; born 27 May 1996) is a Kazakh heavyweight taekwondo competitor. He represented Kazakhstan at the 2016 Summer Olympics in Rio de Janeiro in the men's +80 kg. He was defeated by Azerbaijan's Radik Isaev in the round of 16 and South Korea's Cha Dong-min in the repechages. Zhaparov was the flag bearer for Kazakhstan during the Parade of Nations.

In 2018, Zhaparov won a bronze medal at the Asian Games and a silver at the Asian Championships.

He also competed for Kazakhstan at the 2020 Summer Olympics in the men's +80 kg event.

Olympic Games
Preceded by Yerdos Akhmadiyev	Flagbearer for Kazakhstan; Rio 2016	Succeeded by Abzal Azhgaliyev
