= M'Bar N'Diaye =

French taekwondo practitioner

M'bar N'diaye
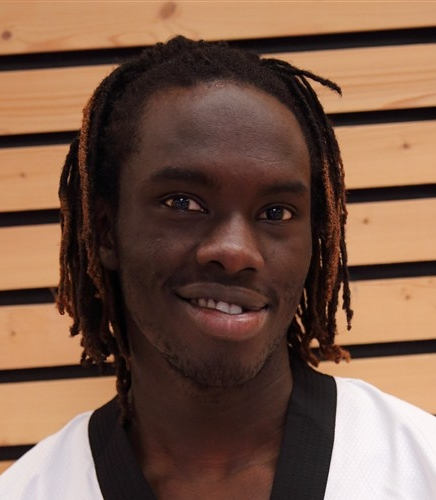
- N'Diaye in 2015

Personal information
- Born: 15 June 1983 (age 43) Mantes-la-Jolie, France
- Height: 1.93 m (6 ft 4 in)
- Weight: 84 kg (185 lb)

Sport
- Country: France
- Sport: Taekwondo

M'bar N'diaye (born 15 June 1983 in Paris) is a French taekwondo athlete.

He represented France at the 2016 Summer Olympics in Rio de Janeiro, in the men's +80 kg.
