= Rafael Alba =

Cuban taekwondo practitioner

Personal information
- Full name: Rafael Yunier Alba Castillo
- Born: 12 August 1993 (age 32) Santiago de Cuba, Cuba
- Height: 202 cm (6 ft 8 in)
- Weight: 87 kg (192 lb)

Sport
- Sport: Taekwondo
- Weight class: +80 kg (180 lb)
Medal record
Men's taekwondo
Representing Cuba
Olympic Games
Bronze medal – third place	2020 Tokyo	+80 kg
Bronze medal – third place	2024 Paris	+80 kg
World Championships
Gold medal – first place	2013 Puebla	–87 kg
Gold medal – first place	2019 Manchester	+87 kg
Bronze medal – third place	2015 Chelyabinsk	–87 kg
Grand Prix
Gold medal – first place	2022 Paris	+80 kg
Silver medal – second place	2015 Manchester	+87 kg
Pan American Games
Gold medal – first place	2015 Toronto	+80 kg
Silver medal – second place	2019 Lima	+80 kg
Pan American Championships
Gold medal – first place	2016 Queretaro	+87 kg
Gold medal – first place	2021 Cancun	+87 kg

Rafael Yunier Alba Castillo (Note: In this Spanish name, the first or paternal surname is Alba and the second or maternal family name is Castillo.) (born 12 August 1993) is a Cuban taekwondo athlete.

Alba competed at the 2016 Summer Olympics in Rio de Janeiro, in the men's +80 kg. At the 2020 Summer Olympics, he won the bronze medal in the men's +80 kg event. Alba won another bronze medal in the same event at the 2024 Summer Olympics.
