= Maicon Andrade =

Brazilian taekwondo practitioner

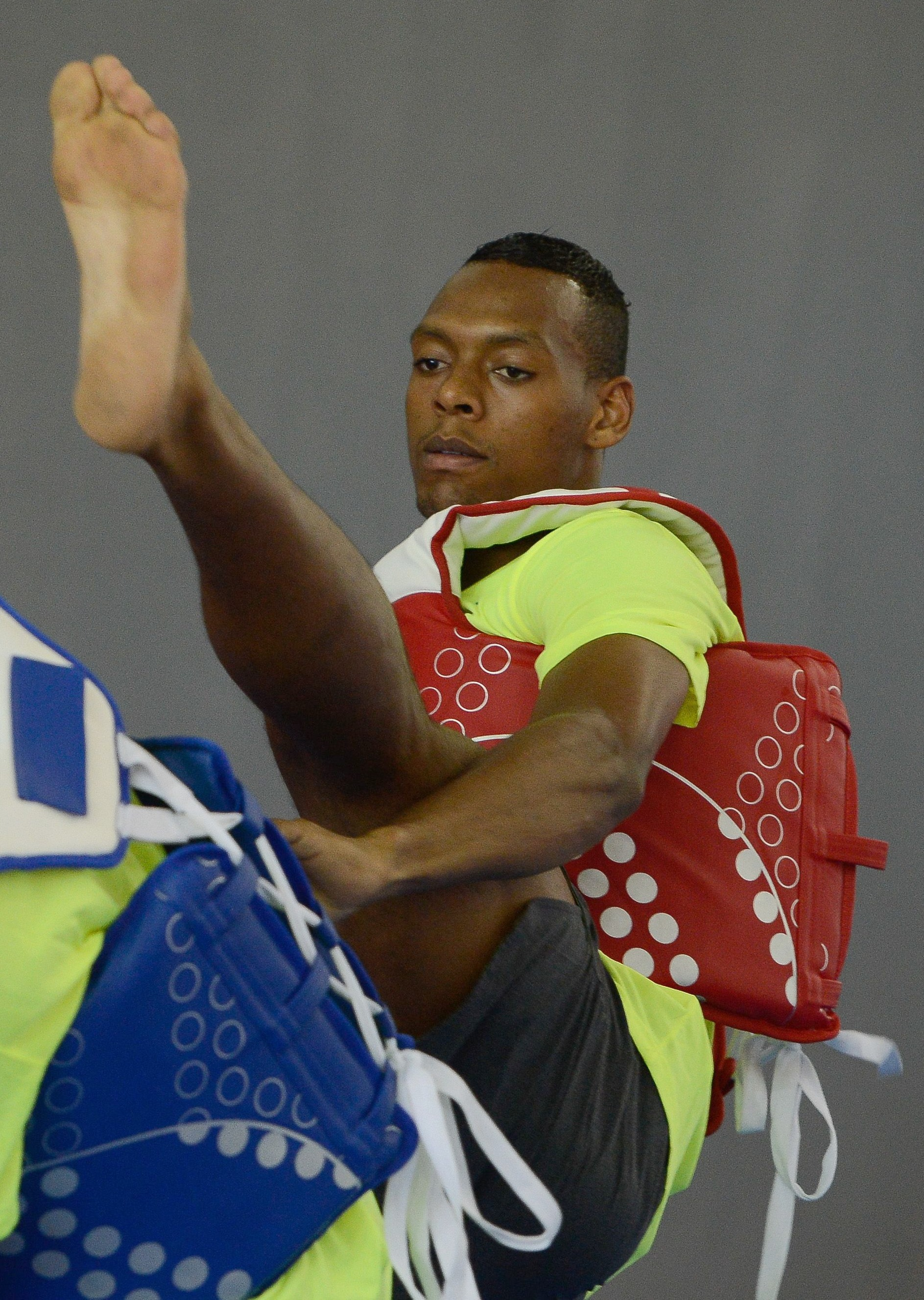
- Maicon de Andrade in 2016

Personal information
- Full name: Maicon de Andrade Siqueira
- Born: 9 January 1993 (age 33) Justinópolis, Ribeirão das Neves, MG, Brazil
- Height: 190 cm (6 ft 3 in)
- Weight: 90 kg (198 lb)

Sport
- Sport: Taekwondo
- Club: São Caetano
Medal record
Men's taekwondo
Representing Brazil
Olympic Games
| Bronze medal – third place | 2016 Rio de Janeiro | +80 kg |
World Championships
| Bronze medal – third place | 2019 Manchester | +87 kg |
Grand Prix
| Gold medal – first place | 2019 Sofia | +80 kg |
| Gold medal – first place | 2022 Manchester | +80 kg |
| Silver medal – second place | 2023 Manchester (F) | +80 kg |
| Bronze medal – third place | 2018 Rome | +80 kg |
Pan American Games
| Gold medal – first place | 2023 Santiago | Team |
| Bronze medal – third place | 2019 Lima | +80 kg |
Pan American Championships
| Bronze medal – third place | 2018 Spokane | +87 kg |
| Bronze medal – third place | 2022 Punta Cana | +87 kg |
South American Games
| Gold medal – first place | 2018 Cochabamba | +80 kg |
Universiade
| Silver medal – second place | 2017 Taipei | +87 kg |
| Bronze medal – third place | 2015 Gwangju | +87 kg |

Maicon de Andrade Siqueira (born 9 January 1993) is a taekwondo competitor from Brazil. He won bronze medals at the 2016 Summer Olympics, at the 2019 World Taekwondo Championships and at the 2019 Pan American Games, being the first Brazilian man to get an Olympic medal in that sport - and second overall after Natália Falavigna.

Maicon is currently serving a two-year ban set to expire in January 2028 for an anti-doping rule violation relating to missed tests.

== Career ==
After starting the sport in a social project in Ribeirão das Neves and combining taekwondo with work as a bricklayer's assistant and waiter to help around the house, Maicon only began to dedicate himself exclusively to fighting in 2013, when he moved to São Caetano do Sul.

At the 2015 Summer Universiade, Maicon obtained a bronze medal in the +87 kg category.

Due to a dispute between the Brazilian Taekwondo Confederation (CBTKD) and the Two Brother Team, he ended up left out of the team that would go to the 2015 Pan American Games in Toronto, Canada.

At the 2016 Rio Olympics, he won his first fight against the American Stephen Lambdin; in the quarterfinals he lost to the Nigerien athlete, Abdoul Razak Issoufou. When the Nigerien qualified for the final, Andrade was able to compete in the repechage. After beating Frenchman M'Bar N'Diaye, he went on to compete for bronze against Mahama Cho, from the United Kingdom, and won by one point after blows at the end. Maicon ended up winning the bronze medal, being the first Brazilian male taekwondist to win an Olympic medal, and Brazil's second achievement in the sport after Natália Falavigna took bronze in Beijing 2008.

At the 2017 World Taekwondo Championships, Maicon almost won a medal, reaching the quarterfinals but being eliminated by Abdoul Razak Issoufou.

At the 2017 Summer Universiade, Maicon reached the final, but was unable to compete due to a muscle contracture in his lower back, taking silver.

At the 2018 South American Games he won a gold medal in the +80 kg modality.

At the 2018 Pan American Taekwondo Championships held in Spokane, USA, Maicon won a bronze medal.

At the 2019 World Taekwondo Championships, Maicon achieved the best result of his career at the world championships by obtaining the bronze medal.

At the 2019 Pan American Games, after defeating Ecuadorian Jesus Perea in the third place match, he won bronze in the over 80 kg category.

Despite having won bronze at the 2019 World Championships, Maicon Andrade was not called up for the pre-Olympics in March 2020. Each country can send only two athletes per gender to the pre-Olympics, despite taekwondo having four categories at the Olympics. The Brazilian Taekwondo Confederation called up Ícaro Miguel (up to 80 kg) and Edival Pontes up to 68 kg. Maicon, Ícaro and Edival closed the world Olympic classification ranking in ninth place in their respective categories, and, subjectively, Maicon was cut from the pre-Olympics. Maicon took legal action against the Brazilian Taekwondo Confederation, but did not obtain the Olympic place.

At the 2022 Pan American Taekwondo Championships held in Punta Cana, Maicon obtained his second bronze at the Taekwondo Pans.

At the 2022 World Taekwondo Championships, Maicon came close to obtaining his second world medal, but was eliminated in the quarterfinals.

At the 2023 World Taekwondo Championships, Maicon, second best in the world rankings, debuted against Argentine Agustin Alves, with the Brazilian winning in two rounds, with 3/1 and 6/5. Then, the Olympic medalist faced Britain's Caden Cunnigham and lost 2-1 (2/0, 0/2 and 1/1).

At the 2023 Pan American Games, the men's team, formed by Maicon Andrade, Edival Pontes and Paulo Melo, won an unprecedented gold medal for the country, after a comeback over Cuba in the semifinals, with a 76–60 triumph, and a decisive victory over Chile 48 to 16.
