= Andrii Harbar =

Ukrainian taekwondo practitioner (born 2000)

Personal information
- Nationality: Ukrainian
- Born: 11 August 2000 (age 25)

Sport
- Sport: Taekwondo
- Event: Heavyweight
Medal record
Men's taekwondo
Representing Ukraine
European Championships
Bronze medal – third place	2021 Sofia	+87 kg
Summer World University Games
Bronze medal – third place	2025 Essen	+87 kg
Bronze medal – third place	2021 Chengdu	+87 kg

Andrii Harbar (born 11 August 2000) is a Ukrainian taekwondo practitioner.

== Early and personal life ==
Harbar lived in Krasnyi Luch and was trained alongside his brother Artem Harbar in taekwondo by their father. In 2014, his family was moved to Druzhkivka in neighbouring Donetsk Oblast due to Russian occupation of their home town. After the Russian invasion of Ukraine, they were forced to move to Kyiv. He studies at the Donbass State Engineering Academy.

== Career ==
Harbar was a bronze medalist in the +87 kg division at the 2021 European Taekwondo Championships in Sofia, Bulgaria. He placed fifth in the +87 kg division at the 2023 European Games. He was a gold medalist in the +87 kg division at the European Universities Combat Sports Championship 2023 in Zagreb. In August 2023a as, he won the 2023 European Championships in Olympic Weights in Tallinn, Estonia.

In July 2025, Harbar won a bronze medal in the +87 kg division at the 2025 World University Games in Germany. Harbar won the -87 kg division at the Polish Open 2025 in Warsaw in September 2025. He defeated the 2024 Olympic champion Arian Salimi before losing against eventual silver medalist Rafail Aiukaev at the 2025 World Taekwondo Championships in China in October 2025.
