= Emre Kutalmış Ateşli =

Turkish taekwondo practitioner

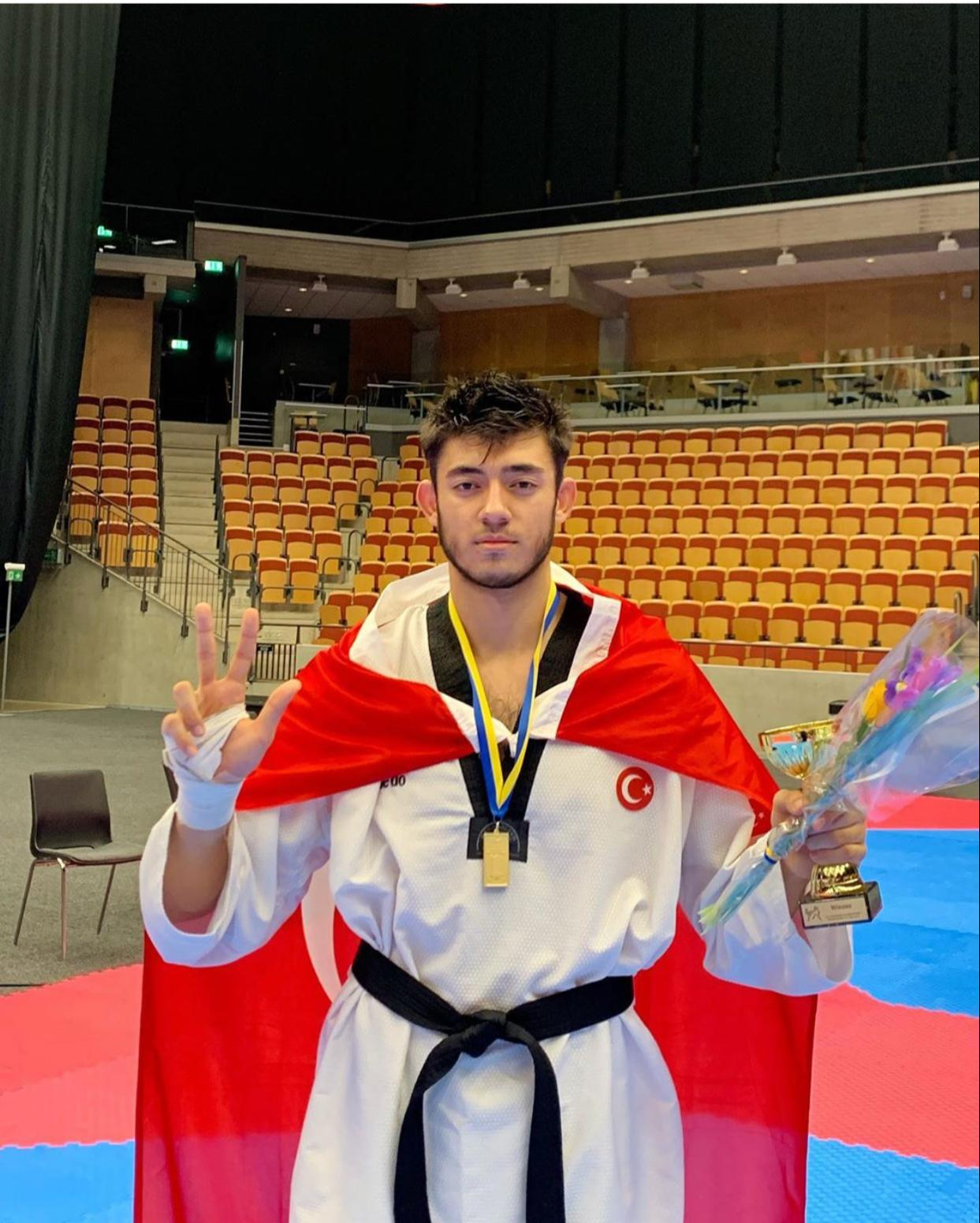

Personal information
- Born: 1 January 2001 (age 25) Tokat, Turkey
- Home town: Ankara, Turkey
- Height: 196 cm (6 ft 5 in)
- Weight: 95 kg (209 lb)

Sport
- Country: Turkey
- Sport: Taekwondo
- Event: Heavyweight
Medal record
Men's taekwondo
Representing Turkey
World Championships
| Bronze medal – third place | 2023 Baku | +87 kg |
European Championships
| Gold medal – first place | 2022 Manchester | +87 kg |
| Bronze medal – third place | 2024 Belgrade | +87 kg |
European Games
| Bronze medal – third place | 2023 Kraków-Małopolska | +87 kg |
Grand Prix
| Gold medal – first place | 2022 Rome | +80 kg |
| Bronze medal – third place | 2022 Manchester | +80 kg |
Mediterranean Games
| Bronze medal – third place | 2018 Tarragona | +80 kg |
Islamic Solidarity Games
| Bronze medal – third place | 2021 Konya | +87 kg |
World University Games
| Gold medal – first place | 2021 Chengdu | +87 kg |
European U21 Championships
| Gold medal – first place | 2018 Warsaw | +87 kg |
| Gold medal – first place | 2019 Helsingborg | +87 kg |
World Junior Championships
| Gold medal – first place | 2018 Hammamet | +78 kg |
European Junior Championships
| Gold medal – first place | 2017 Larnaca | +78 kg |

Emre Kutalmış Ateşli (born 1 January 2001) is a Turkish taekwondo athlete. He won the gold medal at the 2022 European Taekwondo Championships.

== Career ==
Emre Kutalmış Ateşli has won a gold medal at theWorld Taekwondo Junior Championships held in Tunisia's Hammamet. He won the gold medal in the men's +87 kg event at the 2022 European Taekwondo Championships held in Manchester, England. He clinched gold at the 2022 World Taekwondo Grand Prix. Ateşli defeated Cheick Sallah from Ivory Coast to take the top prize in Rome during the men's +87 kg event final.

He won one of the bronze medals in the men's heavyweight event at the 2023 World Taekwondo Championships held in Baku, Azerbaijan.

== Tournament record ==
| Year | Event | Location | G-Rank | Place |
|---|---|---|---|---|
| 2022 | European Championships | (United Kingdom) Manchester | G-4 | 1st |
| 2022 | Grand Prix | (Italy) Rome | G-6 | 1st |
| 2022 | Turkish Open | (Turkey) Antalya | G-1 | 3rd |
| 2022 | Spanish Open | (Spain) La Nucia | G-1 | 3rd |
| 2021 | Olympic Games qualification Europe | (Bulgaria) Sofia | G-1 | 3rd |
| 2021 | WT Presidents Cup - Europe | (Turkey) Istanbul | G-1 | 1st |
| 2021 | Beirut Open | (Lebanon) Beirut | G-1 | 1st |
| 2021 | Sofia Open | (Bulgaria) Sofia | G-1 | 1st |
| 2021 | Albania Open | (Albania) Tirana | G-1 | 1st |
| 2021 | Bosnia Herzegovina Open | (Bosnia and Herzegovina) Sarajevo | G-1 | 1st |
| 2020 | European Clubs Championships | (Croatia) Zagreb | G-1 | 1st |
| 2019 | European U-21 Championships | (Sweden) Helsingborg | G-4 | 1st |
| 2019 | Dutch Open | (Netherlands) Nijmegen | G-1 | 1st |
| 2019 | US Open | (United States) Las Vegas | G-1 | 1st |
| 2019 | Spanish Open | (Spain) Castellon | G-1 | 2nd |
| 2018 | World Junior Championships | (Tunisia) Hammamet | G-12 | 1st |
| 2018 | European U-21 Championships | (Poland) Warsaw | G-4 | 1st |
| 2018 | Mediterranean Games | (Spain) Tarragona | G-4 | 3rd |
| 2018 | Dutch Open | (Germany) Eindhoven | G-1 | 1st |
| 2017 | European Youth Championships | (Cyprus) Larnaca | G-4 | 1st |
| 2017 | Turkish Open | (Turkey) Antalya | G-1 | 1st |
| 2017 | Dutch Open | (Germany) Eindhoven | G-1 | 1st |
| 2017 | WT Presidents Cup - Europe | (Greece) Athen | G-1 | 3rd |
| 2016 | German Open | (Germany) Hamburg | G-1 | 1st |
| 2016 | WT Presidents Cup - Europe | (Germany) Bonn | G-1 | 3rd |
| 2015 | European Cadets Championships | (France) Strasbourg | G-4 | 2nd |
