= Paško Božić =

Croatian taekwondo practitioner

Sport
- Country: Croatia
- Sport: Taekwondo
- Weight class: +87 kg
Medal record
Men's taekwondo
Representing Croatia
World Championships
Bronze medal – third place	2023 Baku	+87 kg
Grand Prix
Bronze medal – third place	2023 Paris	+80 kg
European Games
Bronze medal – third place	2023 Kraków-Małopolska	+87 kg
European Championships
Bronze medal – third place	2022 Manchester	+87 kg

Paško Božić (born 30 January 2002) is a Croatian taekwondo practitioner from Split. He won one of the bronze medals in the men's heavyweight event at the 2023 World Taekwondo Championships held in Baku, Azerbaijan. He also won a bronze medal in his event at the 2022 European Taekwondo Championships held in Manchester, United Kingdom.

In 2022, Božić competed in the men's heavyweight event at the World Taekwondo Championships held in Guadalajara, Mexico where he was eliminated in his first match.

== Achievements ==
Year	Event	Location	Place
2022	European Championships	Manchester, United Kingdom	3rd
2023	World Championships	Baku, Azerbaijan	3rd
2023	European Games	Kraków and Małopolska, Poland	3rd
