= Kenneth Edwards (taekwondo) =

Jamaican taekwondo practitioner

Personal information
- Nickname: Kenman
- Nationality: Jamaica
- Born: 30 December 1985 (age 40) Kingston, Jamaica
- Education: Calabar High School & The University of Technology
- Years active: 20
- Height: 188 cm (6.17 ft)

Sport
- Country: Jamaica
- Sport: Taekwondo
- Club: Ningen Martial Arts
- Team: Jamaica Combined Martial Arts Team

Achievements and titles
- Olympic finals: 2012
Medal record
Men's taekwondo
Representing Jamaica
Central American and Caribbean Games
Bronze medal – third place	2010 Mayagüez	-87 kg
- Updated on 17 September 2012

Kenneth Edwards (born 30 December 1985) is a Jamaican taekwondo athlete, born in Kingston. He started training in Martial Arts at a very young age in Ningen Martial Arts Academy. Later he joined the Jamaica Combined Martial Arts team competing in international Karate, Kickboxing and Taekwondo competitions. He started competing in World Taekwondo in 2005. He competed +80 kg event at the 2012 Summer Olympics.
