= Jonathan Healy (taekwondo) =

American taekwondo practitioner

Personal information
- Full name: Jonathan Daniel Healy
- Born: April 4, 1997 (age 29) Houston, Texas, U. S.
- Home town: Spring, Texas, U. S.
- Height: 6 ft 6 in (198 cm)
- Weight: 225 lb (102 kg)

Sport
- Sport: Taekwondo
- Weight class: +80 kg (180 lb)
- University team: Liberty University
- Coached by: Arlene Limas
Medal record
Men's taekwondo
Representing United States
World Championships
Bronze medal – third place	2025 Wuxi	+87 kg
Pan American Games
Gold medal – first place	2019 Lima	+80 kg
Silver medal – second place	2023 Santiago	+80 kg
Universiade
Bronze medal – third place	2017 Taipei	+87 kg
World Junior Championships
Bronze medal – third place	2014 Taipei	78 kg

Jonathan Daniel Healy (born April 4, 1997) is an American taekwondo athlete. He won the gold medal at the 2019 Pan American Games in the men's +80 kg and a silver medal in the same event at the 2023 Pan American Games.

Healy competed for the United States at the 2024 Summer Olympics.
