= Radik Isayev =

Azerbaijani taekwondo practitioner

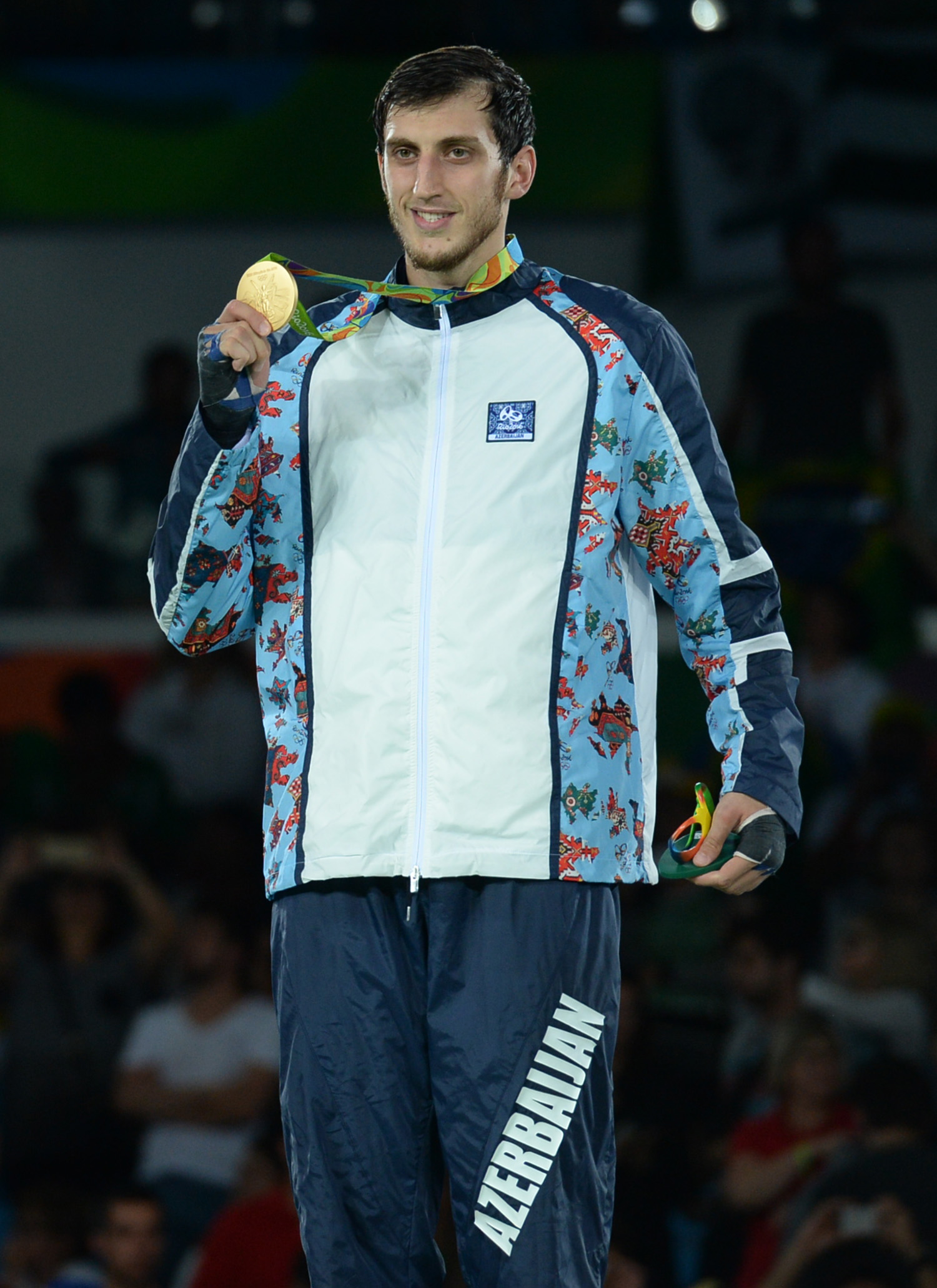

Medal record

Men's taekwondo

Representing Azerbaijan

Summer Olympics
Gold medal – first place	2016 Rio De Janeiro	+80 kg

World Championships
Gold medal – first place	2015 Chelyabinsk	+87 kg
Bronze medal – third place	2013 Puebla	+87 kg

European Games
Gold medal – first place	2015 Baku	+80 kg

European Championships
Gold medal – first place	2014 Baku	+87 kg
Gold medal – first place	2018 Kazan	+87 kg
Bronze medal – third place	2022 Manchester	+87 kg

Islamic Solidarity Games
Gold medal – first place	2017 Baku	+87 kg

World Cup
Gold medal – first place	2015 Mexico	Team
Gold medal – first place	2016 Baku	Team

Universiade
Bronze medal – third place	2017 Taipei	+87 kg

Radik Isayev (born September 26, 1989, in Ukhul, Akhtynsky District, Dagestan) is a Russian-born naturalized Azerbaijani taekwondo practitioner of Lezgin origin. He won the gold medal at the 2014 European Championships in the men's 87 kg event, and also won bronze at the 2013 World Championships. Radik also won a gold medal at the 2016 Summer Olympics in Rio.

Olympic and World Champion Radik Isayev from Azerbaijan won a gold medal at the 2016 Rio Summer Olympics. Radik became World Champion in 2015 and won bronze at World Championships in 2016. Radik became champion of 1st European Games in 2015. He is 2 times European Champion and 2 times World Cup Champion. He became champion of Islamic Games in 2017.
