= Patrik Divkovič =

Slovenian taekwondo practitioner (born 1999)

Patrik Divković
Personal information
- Born: 4 June 1999 (age 27) Ljubljana, Slovenia

Sport
- Country: Slovenia
- Sport: Taekwondo
- Event: +80 kg
Medal record
Men's taekwondo
Representing Slovenia
European Games
| Silver medal – second place | 2023 Kraków-Małopolska | 87 kg |

Patrik Divković (born 4 June 1999) is a Slovenian taekwondo practitioner. He represented Slovenia at the 2024 Summer Olympics.

== Career ==
In March 2024, he competed at the 2024 European Qualification Tournament in Sofia, Bulgaria. He won his semifinal match and qualified to represent Slovenia at the 2024 Summer Olympics.
