= Marc-André Bergeron (taekwondo) =

Canadian taekwondo practitioner

Personal information
- Born: 22 July 1991 (age 34) Quebec City, Quebec, Canada

Sport
- Country: Canada
- Sport: Taekwondo
Medal record
Men's taekwondo
Representing Canada
Pan American Games
Bronze medal – third place	2015 Toronto	+80 kg
Bronze medal – third place	2023 Santiago	+80 kg

Marc-André Bergeron (born 22 July 1991) is a Canadian taekwondo practitioner. In 2015, he was named to be in Canada's team at the 2015 Pan American Games, which were held in Toronto. He won a gold medal at the 2013 Dutch Open and a gold medal at the 2014 Pan American Championships.
