= Caden Cunningham =

British taekwondo practitioner (born 2003)

Personal information
- Full name: Caden Luis Cunningham
- Nationality: British
- Born: 7 May 2003 (age 23) Huddersfield, West Yorkshire, England

Sport
- Country: Great Britain
- Sport: Taekwondo
- Event: Heavyweight
Medal record
Men's taekwondo
Representing Great Britain
Olympic Games
Silver medal – second place	2024 Paris	+80 kg
World Championships
Bronze medal – third place	2025 Wuxi	+87 kg
Grand Prix
Gold medal – first place	2023 Rome	+87 kg
Silver medal – second place	2022 Manchester	+87 kg
Silver medal – second place	2023 Paris	+87 kg
Bronze medal – third place	2022 Rome	+87 kg
European Games
Gold medal – first place	2023 Kraków-Małopolska	+87 kg
European Championships
Gold medal – first place	2024 Belgrade	+87 kg
Gold medal – first place	2026 Munich	+87 kg

Caden Luis Cunningham (born 7 May 2003) is a British taekwondo practitioner. He competes in the + 87 kg Heavyweight division and was a medalist at the 2024 Olympic Games and the 2025 World Taekwondo Championships.

== Early life ==
Cunningham is from Huddersfield, Yorkshire. He attended King James's School, Almondbury. He trained at Quest Taekwondo as a youngster.

== Career ==
Cunningham was a precocious talent winning his first overseas Taekwondo title in Germany, aged twelve years-old. He was subsequently selected to represent Europe at the Children's Taekwondo Union Europe/Asia Challenge in 2016.

Cunningham become the British Cadet taekwondo champion at the national finals in Manchester in 2017, winning the male −49 kg category. He was subsequently selected to represent Great Britain at the European Championships in Hungary later that year.

In his opening fight of the 2022 World Championships he injured the anterior cruciate ligament in his knee but still won the bout, although he missed several months of competitive action after the tournament.

Cunningham won the +80 kg division at the World Taekwondo Grand Prix held at the Foro Italico, Rome in June 2023. He defeated Nikita Rafalovich of Uzbekistan in the final. That month he was also announced in the British squad to take part in the 2023 European Games held in Kraków. Cunningham won the gold medal at the Games in the Men's +87 kg division.

In June 2024, he was selected for the 2024 Paris Olympics. Cunningham won the silver medal in the men's 80+Kg category.

Cunningham was a bronze medalist at the 2025 World Taekwondo Championships in China in October 2025.

In May 2026, Cunningham retained his title at the 2026 European Taekwondo Championships in Munich, Germany in the men's +87 kg category.
