= 2023 ICF Canoe Sprint World Championships – Men's C-1 1000 metres =

Men's C-1 1000 metres at the 2023 ICF Canoe Sprint World Championships
- Venue: Sportpark Duisburg
- Location: Duisburg, Germany
- Dates: 23–26 August
- Competitors: 35 from 35 nations
- Winning time: 3:45.124

Medalists
gold medal	Martin Fuksa	Czech Republic
silver medal	Cătălin Chirilă	Romania
bronze medal	Sebastian Brendel	Germany

The men's C-1 1000 metres competition at the 2023 ICF Canoe Sprint World Championships in Duisburg took place in Sportpark Duisburg.

== Schedule ==
The schedule is as follows:

Date	Time	Round
Wednesday 23 August 2023	17:27	Heats
Thursday 24 August 2023	16:34	Semifinals
Saturday 26 August 2023	9:44	Final C
Saturday 26 August 2023	9:51	Final B
Saturday 26 August 2023	12:01	Final A

== Results ==
=== Heats ===
The fastest five boats in each heat, plus the fastest two remaining boats, advanced to the semi-finals.

==== Heat 1 ====
Rank	Canoeist	Country	Time	Notes
1	Wiktor Glazunow	Poland	4:03.958	QS
2	Pavlo Altukhov	Ukraine	4:05.413	QS
3	Yu Yuebin	China	4:05.872	QS
4	Joosep Karlson	Estonia	4:07.427	QS
5	Manfred Pallinger	Austria	4:08.535	QS
6	Mattia Alfonsi	Italy	4:14.298	QS
7	Mohamed Ali Merzougui	Algeria	4:46.020	
8	Michael Akpos Moses	Nigeria	5:01.061	

==== Heat 2 ====
Rank	Canoeist	Country	Time	Notes
1	Balázs Adolf	Hungary	4:05.668	QS
2	Serghei Tarnovschi	Moldova	4:09.964	QS
3	Diego Domínguez	Spain	4:11.772	QS
4	Jonathan Grady	United States	4:13.064	QS
5	Rigoberto Camilo	Mexico	4:14.190	QS
6	Michael Martínez	Chile	4:19.155	QS
7	Marco Apura	Portugal	4:26.535	
8	Admilson André Batista De Souza	São Tomé and Príncipe	4:53.244	

==== Heat 3 ====
Rank	Canoeist	Country	Time	Notes
1	Martin Fuksa	Czech Republic	4:03.580	QS
2	Benjamin Manning	Australia	4:12.398	QS
3	Sergio Díaz	Colombia	4:15.275	QS
4	Arjun Singh	India	4:17.349	QS
5	John-Paul Selecio	Philippines	4:40.158	QS
6	Umar Rustamov	Tajikistan	5:06.855	
	Edwar Paredes	Venezuela	DNF	
	Rade Pedich	Armenia	DNS	

==== Heat 4 ====
Rank	Canoeist	Country	Time	Notes
1	Cătălin Chirilă	Romania	3:57.524	QS
2	Isaquias Santos	Brazil	4:07.828	QS
3	Connor Fitzpatrick	Canada	4:09.873	QS
4	Stefanos Dimopoulos	Greece	4:11.280	QS
5	Cristian Sola	Ecuador	4:35.371	QS
6	Joaquim Lobo	Mozambique	4:55.667	

==== Heat 5 ====
Rank	Canoeist	Country	Time	Notes
1	Sebastian Brendel	Germany	4:02.949	QS
2	Adrien Bart	France	4:03.259	QS
3	José Córdova	Cuba	4:04.643	QS
4	Mohammad Nabi Rezaei	Iran	4:05.319	QS
5	Takanori Tome	Japan	4:25.892	QS
6	Benilson Sanda	Angola	4:41.364	QS

=== Semifinal ===
The fastest three boats in each semi advanced to the A final.
The next three fastest boats in each semi advanced to the final B.

==== Semifinal 1 ====
Rank	Canoeist	Country	Time	Notes
1	Cătălin Chirilă	Romania	3:45.235	QA
2	Wiktor Glazunow	Poland	3:46.346	QA
3	Serghei Tarnovschi	Moldova	3:50.359	QA
4	Stefanos Dimopoulos	Greece	3:52.648	QB
5	Adrien Bart	France	3:54.409	QB
6	Takanori Tome	Japan	3:55.670	QB
7	Joosep Karlson	Estonia	3:59.613	QC
8	Rigoberto Camilo	Mexico	4:07.364	QC
9	Sergio Díaz	Colombia	4:11.984	QC

==== Semifinal 2 ====
Rank	Canoeist	Country	Time	Notes
1	Martin Fuksa	Czech Republic	3:45.161	QA
2	Isaquias Santos	Brazil	3:47.449	QA
3	Pavlo Altukhov	Ukraine	3:49.330	QA
4	José Córdova	Cuba	3:52.164	QB
5	Manfred Pallinger	Austria	3:57.458	QB
6	Mattia Alfonsi	Italy	3:57.476	QB
7	Diego Domínguez	Spain	3:59.761	QC
8	Arjun Singh	India	4:02.896	QC
9	Cristian Sola	Ecuador	4:04.863	QC

==== Semifinal 3 ====
Rank	Canoeist	Country	Time	Notes
1	Balázs Adolf	Hungary	3:45.919	QA
2	Sebastian Brendel	Germany	3:47.689	QA
3	Connor Fitzpatrick	Canada	3:51.164	QA
4	Mohammad Nabi Rezaei	Iran	3:52.555	QB
5	Jonathan Grady	United States	4:00.600	QB
6	Benjamin Manning	Australia	4:02.354	QB
7	Yu Yuebin	China	4:18.164	QC
8	John-Paul Selecio	Philippines	4:28.544	QC
9	Michael Martínez	Chile	4:26.206	QC

=== Finals ===
==== Final C ====
Competitors in this final raced for positions 19 to 26.

Rank	Canoeist	Country	Time
1	Diego Domínguez	Spain	3:54.462
2	Sergio Díaz	Colombia	3:54.588
3	Joosep Karlson	Estonia	3:58.716
4	Arjun Singh	India	4:01.661
5	Rigoberto Camilo	Mexico	4:01.967
6	Cristian Sola	Ecuador	4:06.039
7	Michael Martínez	Chile	4:06.960
8	Yu Yuebin	China	4:07.950
9	John-Paul Selecio	Philippines	4:32.942

==== Final B ====
Competitors in this final raced for positions 10 to 18.

Rank	Canoeist	Country	Time
1	José Córdova	Cuba	3:49.456
2	Adrien Bart	France	3:53.654
3	Stefanos Dimopoulos	Greece	3:54.392
4	Mohammad Nabi Rezaei	Iran	3:54.583
5	Mattia Alfonsi	Italy	3:56.344
6	Manfred Pallinger	Austria	3:56.882
7	Takanori Tome	Japan	3:57.235
8	Benjamin Manning	Australia	4:02.161
9	Jonathan Grady	United States	4:13.081

==== Final A ====
Competitors raced for positions 1 to 9, with medals going to the top three.

Rank	Canoeist	Country	Time
1st place, gold medalist(s)	Martin Fuksa	Czech Republic	3:45.124
2nd place, silver medalist(s)	Cătălin Chirilă	Romania	3:45.958
3rd place, bronze medalist(s)	Sebastian Brendel	Germany	3:46.581
4	Wiktor Glazunow	Poland	3:46.605
5	Balázs Adolf	Hungary	3:47.828
6	Isaquias Santos	Brazil	3:48.860
7	Serghei Tarnovschi	Moldova	3:52.380
8	Pavlo Altukhov	Ukraine	3:53.060
9	Connor Fitzpatrick	Canada	3:53.334
