= 2022 ICF Canoe Sprint World Championships – Men's C-1 1000 metres =

Men's C-1 1000 metres at the 2022 ICF Canoe Sprint World Championships
- Venue: Lake Banook
- Location: Dartmouth, Canada
- Dates: 4–7 August
- Competitors: 23 from 23 nations
- Winning time: 4:14.28

Medalists
gold medal	Cătălin Chirilă	Romania
silver medal	Isaquias Santos	Brazil
bronze medal	Martin Fuksa	Czech Republic

The men's C-1 1000 metres competition at the 2022 ICF Canoe Sprint World Championships in Dartmouth took place on Lake Banook.

== Schedule ==
The schedule is as follows:

Date	Time	Round
Thursday 4 August 2022	11:10	Heats
Friday 5 August 2022	15:10	Semifinals
Sunday 7 August 2022	10:20	Final B
Sunday 7 August 2022	11:33	Final A

== Results ==
=== Heats ===
The fastest boat in each heat advanced directly to the A final.
The next six fastest boats in each heat advanced to the semifinals.

==== Heat 1 ====
Rank	Canoeist	Country	Time	Notes
1	Carlo Tacchini	Italy	4:01.68	QA
2	Martin Fuksa	Czech Republic	4:06.28	QS
3	Wiktor Głazunow	Poland	4:09.57	QS
4	José Córdova	Cuba	4:10.97	QS
5	Matej Rusnák	Slovakia	4:13.98	QS
6	Ian Ross	United States	4:24.29	QS
7	Hikaru Sato	Japan	4:24.29	QS
	Sergio Díaz	Colombia	DNS	

==== Heat 2 ====
Rank	Canoeist	Country	Time	Notes
1	Cătălin Chirilă	Romania	3:59.40	QA
2	Isaquias Santos	Brazil	3:59.71	QS
3	Serghei Tarnovschi	Moldova	4:13.54	QS
4	Zheng Pengfei	China	4:15.26	QS
5	Pablo Crespo	Spain	4:18.49	QS
6	Roberts Lazdiņš	Latvia	4:19.97	QS
7	Rigoberto Camilo	Mexico	4:40.22	QS

==== Heat 3 ====
Rank	Canoeist	Country	Time	Notes
1	Adrien Bart	France	4:05.82	QA
2	Pavlo Altukhov	Ukraine	4:10.84	QS
3	Balázs Adolf	Hungary	4:12.94	QS
4	Connor Fitzpatrick	Canada	4:13.74	QS
5	Joosep Karlson	Estonia	4:16.48	QS
6	Lai Kuan	Chinese Taipei	4:17.89	QS
7	Angel Kodinov	Bulgaria	4:36.44	QS
8	Ghailene Khattali	Tunisia	4:38.66	

=== Semifinals ===
The three fastest boats in each semi advanced to the A final.
The next four fastest boats in each semi, plus the fastest remaining boat advanced to the B final.

==== Semifinal 1 ====
Rank	Canoeist	Country	Time	Notes
1	Zheng Pengfei	China	4:09.87	QA
2	Serghei Tarnovschi	Moldova	4:10.43	QA
3	Wiktor Głazunow	Poland	4:12.37	QA
4	Connor Fitzpatrick	Canada	4:16.79	QB
5	Matej Rusnák	Slovakia	4:18.44	QB
6	Pavlo Altukhov	Ukraine	4:21.88	QB
7	Ian Ross	United States	4:27.88	QB
8	Roberts Lazdiņš	Latvia	4:29.29	
9	Angel Kodinov	Bulgaria	5:38.68	

==== Semifinal 2 ====
Rank	Canoeist	Country	Time	Notes
1	Isaquias Santos	Brazil	4:09.37	QA
2	Martin Fuksa	Czech Republic	4:10.34	QA
3	José Córdova	Cuba	4:10.75	QA
4	Balázs Adolf	Hungary	4:11.10	QB
5	Joosep Karlson	Estonia	4:17.37	QB
6	Pablo Crespo	Spain	4:18.02	QB
7	Rigoberto Camilo	Mexico	4:23.82	QB
8	Lai Kuan	Chinese Taipei	4:23.84	qB
9	Hikaru Sato	Japan	4:34.88	

=== Finals ===
==== Final B ====
Competitors in this final raced for positions 10 to 18.

Rank	Canoeist	Country	Time
1	Pavlo Altukhov	Ukraine	4:16.22
2	Connor Fitzpatrick	Canada	4:16.97
3	Balázs Adolf	Hungary	4:19.68
4	Pablo Crespo	Spain	4:23.41
5	Matej Rusnák	Slovakia	4:25.74
6	Lai Kuan	Chinese Taipei	4:26.27
7	Ian Ross	United States	4:28.45
8	Joosep Karlson	Estonia	4:29.77
9	Rigoberto Camilo	Mexico	4:30.19

==== Final A ====
Competitors in this final raced for positions 1 to 9, with medals going to the top three.

Rank	Canoeist	Country	Time
1st place, gold medalist(s)	Cătălin Chirilă	Romania	4:14.28
2nd place, silver medalist(s)	Isaquias Santos	Brazil	4:15.80
3rd place, bronze medalist(s)	Martin Fuksa	Czech Republic	4:16.21
4	Adrien Bart	France	4:16.80
5	Carlo Tacchini	Italy	4:17.26
6	Serghei Tarnovschi	Moldova	4:19.25
7	Wiktor Głazunow	Poland	4:19.80
8	Zheng Pengfei	China	4:21.55
9	José Córdova	Cuba	4:21.64
