= 2021 ICF Canoe Sprint World Championships – Men's C-1 1000 metres =

International sporting competition

Men's C-1 1000 metres at the 2021 ICF Canoe Sprint World Championships
- Venue: Lake Bagsværd
- Location: Copenhagen, Denmark
- Dates: 16–18 September
- Competitors: 20 from 20 nations
- Winning time: 3:50.73

Medalists
gold medal	Conrad-Robin Scheibner	Germany
silver medal	Martin Fuksa	Czech Republic
bronze medal	Balázs Adolf	Hungary

The men's C-1 1000 metres competition at the 2021 ICF Canoe Sprint World Championships in Copenhagen took place on Lake Bagsværd.

== Schedule ==
The schedule was as follows:

Date	Time	Round
Thursday 16 September 2021	10:41	Heats
Thursday 16 September 2021	18:05	Semifinals
Saturday 18 September 2021	09:53	Final B
Saturday 18 September 2021	11:32	Final A

All times are Central European Summer Time (UTC+2)

== Results ==
=== Heats ===
Heat winners advanced directly to the A final.
The next six fastest boats in each heat advanced to the semifinals.

==== Heat 1 ====
Rank	Canoeist	Country	Time	Notes
1	Serghei Tarnovschi	Moldova	4:05.43	QA
2	José Ramón Pelier	Cuba	4:08.22	QS
3	Mohammad Nabi Rezaei	Iran	4:10.06	QS
4	Connor Fitzpatrick	Canada	4:11.94	QS
5	Matej Rusnák	Slovakia	4:12.36	QS
6	Angel Kodinov	Bulgaria	4:43.02	QS
–	Baker Nsamba	Uganda	DNS	

==== Heat 2 ====
Rank	Canoeist	Country	Time	Notes
1	Martin Fuksa	Czech Republic	4:07.17	QA
2	Conrad-Robin Scheibner	Germany	4:08.79	QS
3	Maksim Piatrou	Belarus	4:09.45	QS
4	Balázs Adolf	Hungary	4:13.26	QS
5	Ilya Pervukhin	RCF	4:13.42	QS
6	Vadim Korobov	Lithuania	5:00.38	QS
7	David Barreiro	Spain	5:02.12	QS

==== Heat 3 ====
Rank	Canoeist	Country	Time	Notes
1	Adrien Bart	France	4:07.67	QA
2	Carlo Tacchini	Italy	4:11.95	QS
3	Mateusz Kamiński	Poland	4:13.50	QS
4	Joosep Karlson	Estonia	4:29.64	QS
5	Bruno Kumpez	Croatia	4:34.36	QS
6	Pavlo Altukhov	Ukraine	4:37.25	QS

=== Semifinals ===
Qualification was as follows:

The fastest three boats in each semi advanced to the A final.
The next four fastest boats in each semi, plus the fastest remaining boat advanced to the B final.

==== Semifinal 1 ====
Rank	Canoeist	Country	Time	Notes
1	Maksim Piatrou	Belarus	3:59.72	QA
2	Balázs Adolf	Hungary	4:00.78	QA
3	Carlo Tacchini	Italy	4:02.39	QA
4	Angel Kodinov	Bulgaria	4:03.86	QB
5	Matej Rusnák	Slovakia	4:05.74	QB
6	Mohammad Nabi Rezaei	Iran	4:05.89	QB
7	Joosep Karlson	Estonia	4:10.75	QB
8	Vadim Korobov	Lithuania	4:43.30	

==== Semifinal 2 ====
Rank	Canoeist	Country	Time	Notes
1	Conrad-Robin Scheibner	Germany	3:57.79	QA
2	José Ramón Pelier	Cuba	3:58.70	QA
3	Mateusz Kamiński	Poland	4:00.02	QA
4	Ilya Pervukhin	RCF	4:01.19	QB
5	Connor Fitzpatrick	Canada	4:05.24	QB
6	David Barreiro	Spain	4:06.26	QB
7	Pavlo Altukhov	Ukraine	4:11.08	QB
8	Bruno Kumpez	Croatia	4:31.20	qB

=== Finals ===
==== Final B ====
Competitors in this final raced for positions 10 to 18.

Rank	Canoeist	Country	Time
1	Connor Fitzpatrick	Canada	3:56.51
2	Ilya Pervukhin	RCF	3:56.78
3	Mohammad Nabi Rezaei	Iran	3:57.72
4	Angel Kodinov	Bulgaria	3:58.47
5	Pavlo Altukhov	Ukraine	3:59.29
6	Matej Rusnák	Slovakia	4:01.23
7	David Barreiro	Spain	4:02.70
8	Joosep Karlson	Estonia	4:20.01
9	Bruno Kumpez	Croatia	4:27.57

==== Final A ====
Competitors raced for positions 1 to 9, with medals going to the top three.

Rank	Canoeist	Country	Time
1st place, gold medalist(s)	Conrad-Robin Scheibner	Germany	3:50.73
2nd place, silver medalist(s)	Martin Fuksa	Czech Republic	3:51.39
3rd place, bronze medalist(s)	Balázs Adolf	Hungary	3:51.69
4	Mateusz Kamiński	Poland	3:52.45
5	Maksim Piatrou	Belarus	3:52.66
6	Serghei Tarnovschi	Moldova	3:53.51
7	José Ramón Pelier	Cuba	3:58.29
8	Carlo Tacchini	Italy	4:00.63
9	Adrien Bart	France	4:09.18
