= 2019 ICF Canoe Sprint World Championships – Men's C-1 1000 metres =

Men's C-1 1000 metres at the 2019 ICF Canoe Sprint World Championships
- Venue: Olympic Centre of Szeged
- Location: Szeged, Hungary
- Dates: 23–25 August
- Competitors: 45 from 45 nations
- Winning time: 3:59.23

Medalists
| gold medal | Isaquias Queiroz | Brazil |
| silver medal | Tomasz Kaczor | Poland |
| bronze medal | Adrien Bart | France |

The men's C-1 1000 metres competition at the 2019 ICF Canoe Sprint World Championships in Szeged took place at the Olympic Centre of Szeged.

== Schedule ==
The schedule was as follows:

| Date | Time | Round |
|---|---|---|
| Friday 23 August 2019 | 10:05 | Heats |
| Saturday 24 August 2019 | 15:51 | Semifinals |
| Sunday 25 August 2019 | 10:50 | Final C |
| Sunday 25 August 2019 | 10:57 | Final B |
| Sunday 25 August 2019 | 12:12 | Final A |

All times are Central European Summer Time (UTC+2)

== Results ==
=== Heats ===
The four fastest boats in each heat, plus the three fastest fifth-place boats advanced to the semifinals.

==== Heat 1 ====
| Rank | Canoeist | Country | Time | Notes |
|---|---|---|---|---|
| 1 | Martin Fuksa | Czech Republic | 3:47.08 | QS |
| 2 | Zheng Pengfei | China | 3:48.40 | QS |
| 3 | Ilia Shtokalov | Russia | 3:51.19 | QS |
| 4 | Vadim Korobov | Lithuania | 3:52.19 | QS |
| 5 | Mohammad Nabi Rezaei | Iran | 3:52.55 | qS |
| 6 | Masato Hashimoto | Japan | 4:13.31 | |
| 7 | Joaquim Lobo | Mozambique | 4:28.96 | |
| – | Leon Mussel | Cook Islands | DNF | |

==== Heat 2 ====
| Rank | Canoeist | Country | Time | Notes |
|---|---|---|---|---|
| 1 | Sebastian Brendel | Germany | 3:52.33 | QS |
| 2 | Oleg Tarnovschi | Moldova | 3:53.68 | QS |
| 3 | Vadim Menkov | Uzbekistan | 3:53.88 | QS |
| 4 | Ian Ross | United States | 3:55.76 | QS |
| 5 | Angel Kodinov | Bulgaria | 3:56.06 | qS |
| 6 | Everardo Cristóbal | Mexico | 3:56.39 | |
| 7 | Nikolozi Khatiashvili | Georgia | 4:27.76 | |

==== Heat 3 ====
| Rank | Canoeist | Country | Time | Notes |
|---|---|---|---|---|
| 1 | Maksim Piatrou | Belarus | 3:48.30 | QS |
| 2 | Adrien Bart | France | 3:50.23 | QS |
| 3 | Kim Tae-eun | South Korea | 4:03.52 | QS |
| 4 | Gonzalo Martín | Spain | 4:05.12 | QS |
| 5 | Edwar Paredes | Venezuela | 4:10.14 | |
| 6 | Buly Da Conceição Triste | São Tomé and Príncipe | 4:23.08 | |
| 7 | Benilson Sanda | Angola | 4:29.03 | |
| 8 | Lai Kuan-chieh | Chinese Taipei | 4:30.11 | |

==== Heat 4 ====
| Rank | Canoeist | Country | Time | Notes |
|---|---|---|---|---|
| 1 | Isaquias Queiroz | Brazil | 3:52.95 | QS |
| 2 | Leonid-Valentin Carp | Romania | 3:53.81 | QS |
| 3 | Matej Rusnák | Slovakia | 3:55.72 | QS |
| 4 | Roberts Lagzdins | Latvia | 3:58.14 | QS |
| 5 | Shahriyor Daminov | Tajikistan | 3:58.31 | qS |
| 6 | Velibor Marinkovic | Bosnia and Herzegovina | 4:20.52 | |
| 7 | Josaphat Ngali | Kenya | 4:42.74 | |
| – | Ojay Fuentes | Philippines | DNS | |

==== Heat 5 ====
| Rank | Canoeist | Country | Time | Notes |
|---|---|---|---|---|
| 1 | José Ramón Pelier | Cuba | 3:52.05 | QS |
| 2 | Tomasz Kaczor | Poland | 3:53.79 | QS |
| 3 | Joosep Karlson | Estonia | 3:58.39 | QS |
| 4 | Pavlo Altukhov | Ukraine | 3:59.63 | QS |
| 5 | Bruno Kumpez | Croatia | 4:01.76 | |
| 6 | Gaurav Tomar | India | 4:03.15 | |
| 7 | Ara Virabyan | Armenia | 4:26.32 | |
| 8 | Hadj-Khlifa Dernani | Algeria | 4:42.07 | |

==== Heat 6 ====
| Rank | Canoeist | Country | Time | Notes |
|---|---|---|---|---|
| 1 | Carlo Tacchini | Italy | 3:50.93 | QS |
| 2 | Tamás Kiss | Hungary | 3:52.46 | QS |
| 3 | Mark Oldershaw | Canada | 3:55.87 | QS |
| 4 | Manfred Pallinger | Austria | 3:57.47 | QS |
| 5 | Hélder Silva | Portugal | 4:02.41 | |
| 6 | Ghailene Khattali | Tunisia | 4:19.70 | |
| – | Gaona Grifa Beldin | Peru | DNS | |

=== Semifinals ===
Qualification in each semi was as follows:

The fastest three boats advanced to the A final.
The next three fastest boats advanced to the B final.
The seventh, eighth and ninth-place boats advanced to the C final.

==== Semifinal 1 ====
| Rank | Canoeist | Country | Time | Notes |
|---|---|---|---|---|
| 1 | Sebastian Brendel | Germany | 3:55.33 | QA |
| 2 | José Ramón Pelier | Cuba | 3:56.55 | QA |
| 3 | Adrien Bart | France | 3:57.49 | QA |
| 4 | Pavlo Altukhov | Ukraine | 3:57.75 | QB |
| 5 | Ilia Shtokalov | Russia | 3:59.26 | QB |
| 6 | Matej Rusnák | Slovakia | 4:00.09 | QB |
| 7 | Mark Oldershaw | Canada | 4:02.83 | QC |
| 8 | Shahriyor Daminov | Tajikistan | 4:10.78 | QC |
| 9 | Ian Ross | United States | 4:27.94 | QC |

==== Semifinal 2 ====
| Rank | Canoeist | Country | Time | Notes |
|---|---|---|---|---|
| 1 | Isaquias Queiroz | Brazil | 3:55.73 | QA |
| 2 | Martin Fuksa | Czech Republic | 3:55.81 | QA |
| 3 | Tomasz Kaczor | Poland | 3:56.78 | QA |
| 4 | Tamás Kiss | Hungary | 4:02.43 | QB |
| 5 | Mohammad Nabi Rezaei | Iran | 4:03.23 | QB |
| 6 | Vadim Korobov | Lithuania | 4:04.68 | QB |
| 7 | Roberts Lagzdins | Latvia | 4:08.24 | QC |
| 8 | Kim Tae-eun | South Korea | 4:29.94 | QC |
| 9 | Oleg Tarnovschi | Moldova | 4:59.97 | QC |

==== Semifinal 3 ====
| Rank | Canoeist | Country | Time | Notes |
|---|---|---|---|---|
| 1 | Zheng Pengfei | China | 3:58.63 | QA |
| 2 | Maksim Piatrou | Belarus | 3:59.04 | QA |
| 3 | Carlo Tacchini | Italy | 4:01.19 | QA |
| 4 | Leonid-Valentin Carp | Romania | 4:04.13 | QB |
| 5 | Gonzalo Martín | Spain | 4:05.17 | QB |
| 6 | Manfred Pallinger | Austria | 4:08.86 | QB |
| 7 | Vadim Menkov | Uzbekistan | 4:15.05 | QC |
| 8 | Angel Kodinov | Bulgaria | 4:22.46 | QC |
| 9 | Joosep Karlson | Estonia | 4:23.09 | QC |

=== Finals ===
==== Final C ====
Competitors in this final raced for positions 19 to 27.

| Rank | Canoeist | Country | Time |
|---|---|---|---|
| 1 | Angel Kodinov | Bulgaria | 4:22.22 |
| 2 | Vadim Menkov | Uzbekistan | 4:22.46 |
| 3 | Oleg Tarnovschi | Moldova | 4:22.81 |
| 4 | Mark Oldershaw | Canada | 4:24.65 |
| 5 | Roberts Lagzdins | Latvia | 4:25.35 |
| 6 | Joosep Karlson | Estonia | 4:27.30 |
| 7 | Shahriyor Daminov | Tajikistan | 4:31.57 |
| 8 | Kim Tae-eun | South Korea | 4:33.59 |
| 9 | Ian Ross | United States | 5:04.52 |

==== Final B ====
Competitors in this final raced for positions 10 to 18.

| Rank | Canoeist | Country | Time |
|---|---|---|---|
| 1 | Pavlo Altukhov | Ukraine | 4:16.86 |
| 2 | Tamás Kiss | Hungary | 4:17.38 |
| 3 | Ilia Shtokalov | Russia | 4:17.71 |
| 4 | Mohammad Nabi Rezaei | Iran | 4:20.04 |
| 5 | Matej Rusnák | Slovakia | 4:20.61 |
| 6 | Gonzalo Martín | Spain | 4:20.83 |
| 7 | Vadim Korobov | Lithuania | 4:23.71 |
| 8 | Manfred Pallinger | Austria | 4:33.11 |
| 9 | Leonid-Valentin Carp | Romania | 4:35.60 |

==== Final A ====
Competitors in this final raced for positions 1 to 9, with medals going to the top three.

| Rank | Canoeist | Country | Time |
|---|---|---|---|
| 1st place, gold medalist(s) | Isaquias Queiroz | Brazil | 3:59.23 |
| 2nd place, silver medalist(s) | Tomasz Kaczor | Poland | 4:00.92 |
| 3rd place, bronze medalist(s) | Adrien Bart | France | 4:01.55 |
| 4 | Sebastian Brendel | Germany | 4:01.60 |
| 5 | Martin Fuksa | Czech Republic | 4:02.02 |
| 6 | Maksim Piatrou | Belarus | 4:04.13 |
| 7 | Zheng Pengfei | China | 4:04.28 |
| 8 | Carlo Tacchini | Italy | 4:05.33 |
| 9 | José Ramón Pelier | Cuba | 4:05.62 |
