= Canoeing at the 2020 Summer Olympics – Men's C-1 1000 metres =

Olympic canoeing event

Men's C-1 1000 metres at the Games of the XXXII Olympiad
- Canoeing pictogram
- Venue: Sea Forest Waterway
- Dates: 6 August 2021 (heats and quarterfinal); 7 August 2021 (semifinal & final)
- Competitors: 33 from 20 nations
- Winning time: 4:04.408

Medalists
1st place, gold medalist(s)		Isaquias Queiroz	Brazil
2nd place, silver medalist(s)		Liu Hao	China
3rd place, bronze medalist(s)		Serghei Tarnovschi	Moldova

The men's C-1 1000 metres sprint canoeing event at the 2020 Summer Olympics took place on 6 and 7 August 2021 at the Sea Forest Waterway. At least 12 canoeists from at least 12 nations competed.

== Background ==
This was the 20th appearance of the event, one of four events to be held at every Summer Games since canoeing was introduced in 1936.

The reigning World Champion was Isaquias Queiroz of Brazil; Queiroz took silver at Rio 2016. The reigning Olympic champion is Sebastian Brendel of Germany, who is on the German team after qualifying in C-2 and is eligible to be selected as a second canoeist in C-1.

== Qualification ==
A National Olympic Committee (NOC) could only qualify one boat (and thus earn one women's canoe quota place) in the event; however, NOCs could enter up to 2 boats in the event if they had enough women's canoe quota places from other events (that is, the C-2). A total of 12 qualification places were available, initially allocated as follows:

- 1 place for the host nation, Japan
- 5 places awarded through the 2019 ICF Canoe Sprint World Championships
- 5 places awarded through continental tournaments, 1 per continent
- 1 place awarded through the 2021 Canoe Sprint World Cup Stage 2.

Qualifying places were awarded to the NOC, not to the individual canoeist who earned the place.

Isaquias Queiroz of Brazil qualified in both the C-2 and the C-1, resulting in an additional quota place added to the C-2 (no additional place in C-1). This made a total of 4 World Championship places that were awarded as follows:

Rank	Canoeist	Nation	Qualification	Selected competitor
1	Isaquias Queiroz	Brazil	Earned quota in C-2 1000 m; quota reallocated to C-2	Could enter via C-2
2	Tomasz Kaczor	Poland	Quota #1 in C-1 1000 m	
3	Adrien Bart	France	Quota #2 in C-1 1000 m	Adrien Bart
4	Sebastian Brendel	Germany	Quota #3 in C-1 1000 m	Conrad Scheibner
5	Martin Fuksa	Czech Republic	Quota #4 in C-1 1000 m	

The Americas continental tournament was cancelled; that place was allocated through the World Championships, with the place going to Cuba. One of the two Tripartite Commission invitational spots in canoeing was extended to Joaquim Lobo of Mozambique. Asia's continental place was earned by China, Europe's by Ukraine, Africa's by Tunisia, and Oceania's by Samoa (after Australia declined the spot). Moldova earned the final spot at the World Cup.:

Nation	Qualification	Selected competitor
Tunisia	Africa quota in C-1 1000 m	
Cuba	Americas quota in C-1 1000 m	
China	Asia quota in C-1 1000 m	
Ukraine	Europe quota in C-1 1000 m	
Samoa	Oceania quota in C-1 1000 m	Rudolph Berking-Williams
Moldova	World Cup quota in C-1 1000 m	
Mozambique	Tripartite Invitation	Joaquim Lobo
Japan	Host quota for men's canoe	

Nations that could enter (additional) boats due to qualifying in the C-2:

Nation	Selected competitor 1	Selected competitor 2
Brazil		
Canada		
China		2 boat limit
Cuba		2 boat limit
Czech Republic		2 boat limit
Germany		2 boat limit
Hungary		
Kazakhstan		
Poland		2 boat limit
Romania		
ROC		
São Tomé and Príncipe		
Spain		
Ukraine		2 boat limit

== Competition format ==
Sprint canoeing uses a four-round format for events with at least 11 boats, with heats, quarterfinals, semifinals, and finals. The details for each round depend on how many boats ultimately enter.

The course is a flatwater course 9 metres wide. The name of the event describes the particular format within sprint canoeing. The "C" format means a canoe, with the canoeist kneeling and using a single-bladed paddle to paddle and steer (as opposed to a kayak, with a seated canoeist, double-bladed paddle, and foot-operated rudder). The "1" is the number of canoeists in each boat. The "1000 metres" is the distance of each race.

== Schedule ==
The event was held over two consecutive days, with two rounds per day. All sessions started at 9:30 a.m. local time, though there were multiple events with races in each session.

Legend
H	Heats	¼	Quarter-finals	½	Semi-finals	F	Final

Sprint
Event↓/Date →	Mon 2	Tue 3	Wed 4	Thu 5	Fri 6		Sat 7	
Men's C-1 1000 m					H	¼	½	F

== Results ==
=== Heats ===
Progression System: 1st-2nd to SF, rest to QF.

==== Heat 1 ====
Rank	Lane	Canoer	Country	Time	Notes
1	6	Cătălin Chirilă	Romania	4:05.617	SF
2	5	José Ramón Pelier	Cuba	4:06.343	SF
3	4	Zheng Pengfei	China	4:10.115	QF
4	3	Mateusz Kamiński	Poland	4:11.202	QF
5	6	Viktor Melantyev	ROC	4:14.004	QF
6	1	Dániel Fejes	Hungary	4:34.000	QF
7	2	Takanori Tōme	Japan	4:37.208	QF

==== Heat 2 ====
Rank	Lane	Canoer	Country	Time	Notes
1	5	Isaquias Queiroz	Brazil	3:59.894	SF
2	6	Liu Hao	China	4:06.914	SF
3	2	Petr Fuksa	Czech Republic	4:14.482	QF
4	3	Pavlo Altukhov	Ukraine	4:15.508	QF
5	1	Sergey Yemelyanov	Kazakhstan	4:16.039	QF
6	4	Wiktor Głazunow	Poland	4:25.996	QF
7	7	Rudolph Berking-Williams	Samoa	5:19.538	QF

==== Heat 3 ====
Rank	Lane	Canoer	Country	Time	Notes
1	5	Martin Fuksa	Czech Republic	4:01.620	SF
2	2	Balázs Adolf	Hungary	4:01.665	SF
3	4	Sebastian Brendel	Germany	4:02.351	QF
4	6	Jacky Godmann	Brazil	4:24.732	QF
5	6	Roland Varga	Canada	4:49.250	QF
6	3	Joaquim Lobo	Mozambique	4:49.676	QF
7	1	Roque Fernandes Dos Ramos	São Tomé and Príncipe	5:00.977	QF

==== Heat 4 ====
Rank	Lane	Canoer	Country	Time	Notes
1	4	Serghei Tarnovschi	Moldova	4:02.794	SF
2	5	Adrien Bart	France	4:03.771	SF
3	1	Vladislav Chebotar	ROC	4:28.951	QF
4	6	Cayetano García	Spain	4:34.418	QF
5	2	Victor Mihalachi	Romania	4:39.865	QF
6	3	Buly Da Conceição Triste	São Tomé and Príncipe	4:57.659	QF

==== Heat 5 ====
Rank	Lane	Canoer	Country	Time	Notes
1	4	Fernando Jorge	Cuba	4:04.378	SF
2	5	Conrad-Robin Scheibner	Germany	4:04.920	SF
3	2	Connor Fitzpatrick	Canada	4:05.577	QF
4	1	Yurii Vandiuk	Ukraine	4:11.346	QF
5	6	Pablo Martínez	Spain	4:21.729	QF
6	3	Ghailene Khattali	Tunisia	4:39.791	QF

=== Quarterfinals ===
Progression System: 1st-2nd to SF, rest out.

==== Quarterfinal 1 ====
Rank	Lane	Canoer	Country	Time	Notes
1	5	Zheng Pengfei	China	4:05.502	SF
2	4	Pavlo Altukhov	Ukraine	4:06.018	SF
3	3	Mateusz Kamiński	Poland	4:08.172	
4	6	Sergey Yemelyanov	Kazakhstan	4:21.734	
5	7	Dániel Fejes	Hungary	4:21.847	
6	2	Roland Varga	Canada	4:28.174	
7	1	Buly Da Conceição Triste	São Tomé and Príncipe	4:55.527	
	8	Rudolph Berking-Williams	Samoa	DNS	

==== Quarterfinal 2 ====
Rank	Lane	Canoer	Country	Time	Notes
1	7	Wiktor Głazunow	Poland	4:07.632	SF
2	4	Connor Fitzpatrick	Canada	4:09.622	SF
3	6	Viktor Melantyev	ROC	4:11.095	
4	5	Petr Fuksa	Czech Republic	4:14.476	
5	2	Victor Mihalachi	Romania	4:15.007	
6	3	Jacky Godmann	Brazil	4:18.208	
7	1	Ghailene Khattali	Tunisia	4:35.417	
8	8	Roque Fernandes Dos Ramos	São Tomé and Príncipe	5:10.506	

==== Quarterfinal 3 ====
Rank	Lane	Canoer	Country	Time	Notes
1	5	Sebastian Brendel	Germany	4:07.036	SF
2	3	Yurii Vandiuk	Ukraine	4:08.719	SF
3	2	Pablo Martínez	Spain	4:09.102	
4	4	Vladislav Chebotar	ROC	4:18.517	
5	6	Cayetano García	Spain	4:31.929	
6	1	Takanori Tōme	Japan	4:38.546	
7	7	Joaquim Lobo	Mozambique	5:04.687	

=== Semifinals ===
Progression System: 1st-4th to Final A, rest to Final B.

==== Semifinal 1 ====
Rank	Lane	Canoer	Country	Time	Notes
1	2	Adrien Bart	France	4:04.026	FA
2	6	Liu Hao	China	4:04.196	FA
3	4	Martin Fuksa	Czech Republic	4:04.220	FA
4	3	Fernando Jorge	Cuba	4:04.725	FA
5	1	Pavlo Altukhov	Ukraine	4:05.857	FB
6	5	Cătălin Chirilă	Romania	4:09.397	FB
7	7	Wiktor Głazunow	Poland	4:09.876	FB
8	8	Yurii Vandiuk	Ukraine	4:20.098	FB

==== Semifinal 2 ====
Rank	Lane	Canoer	Country	Time	Notes
1	4	Isaquias Queiroz	Brazil	4:05.579	FA
2	5	Serghei Tarnovschi	Moldova	4:06.635	FA
3	2	Conrad-Robin Scheibner	Germany	4:08.503	FA
4	7	Zheng Pengfei	China	4:09.139	FA
5	6	Balázs Adolf	Hungary	4:09.177	FB
6	3	José Ramón Pelier	Cuba	4:09.696	FB
7	1	Sebastian Brendel	Germany	4:11.413	FB
8	8	Connor Fitzpatrick	Canada	4:12.609	FB

=== Finals ===
==== Final A ====
Rank	Lane	Canoer	Country	Time	Notes
1st place, gold medalist(s)	4	Isaquias Queiroz	Brazil	4:04.408	
2nd place, silver medalist(s)	3	Liu Hao	China	4:05.724	
3rd place, bronze medalist(s)	6	Serghei Tarnovschi	Moldova	4:06.069	
4	5	Adrien Bart	France	4:06.171	
5	7	Martin Fuksa	Czech Republic	4:08.755	
6	2	Conrad-Robin Scheibner	Germany	4:13.725	
7	1	Fernando Jorge	Cuba	4:13.918	
8	8	Zheng Pengfei	China	4:14.048	

==== Final B ====
Rank	Lane	Canoer	Country	Time	Notes
1	6	José Ramón Pelier	Cuba	4:02.915	
2	2	Sebastian Brendel	Germany	4:03.723	
3	3	Cătălin Chirilă	Romania	4:03.973	
4	5	Pavlo Altukhov	Ukraine	4:04.098	
5	7	Wiktor Głazunow	Poland	4:04.463	
6	8	Connor Fitzpatrick	Canada	4:06.043	
7	4	Balázs Adolf	Hungary	4:07.613	
8	1	Yurii Vandiuk	Ukraine	4:10.910	
