= Canoeing at the 2024 Summer Olympics – Men's C-1 1000 metres =

Men's C-1 1000 metres at the Games of the XXXIII Olympiad
- Venue: National Olympic Nautical Stadium of Île-de-France, Vaires-sur-Marne
- Dates: 7 August 2024 (heats and quarterfinals); 9 August 2024 (semifinals & finals)
- Competitors: 25 from 21 nations
- Winning time: 3:43.16

Medalists
1st place, gold medalist(s)		Martin Fuksa	Czech Republic
2nd place, silver medalist(s)		Isaquias Queiroz	Brazil
3rd place, bronze medalist(s)		Serghei Tarnovschi	Moldova

The men's C-1 1000 metres sprint canoeing event at the 2024 Summer Olympics took place on 7 and 9 August 2024 at the National Olympic Nautical Stadium of Île-de-France in Vaires-sur-Marne.

Martin Fuksa won the competition. The defending 2020 Olympic champion Isaquias Queiroz won the silver medal, and Serghei Tarnovschi took the bronze medal.

== Background ==
This was the 21st appearance of the event after it was introduced at the 1936 Olympics.

== Competition format ==
Sprint canoeing uses a four-round format for events with at least 11 boats, with heats, quarterfinals, semifinals, and finals. The details for each round depend on how many boats ultimately enter.

The course is a flatwater course 9 metres wide. The name of the event describes the particular format within sprint canoeing. The "C" format means a canoe, with the canoeist kneeling and using a single-bladed paddle to paddle and steer (as opposed to a kayak, with a seated canoeist, double-bladed paddle, and foot-operated rudder). The "1" is the number of canoeists in each boat. The "1000 metres" is the distance of each race.

== Schedule ==
All times are Central European Summer Time (UTC+2)

The event will be held over two days, with two rounds per day.

Date	Time	Round
7 August 2024	11:40; 14:40	Heats; Quarterfinals
9 August 2024	11:30; 13:40	Semifinals; Finals

== Results ==
The first and second finishers of every heat advances to the semifinal and the rest go to the quarterfinals.

Heat 1

Rank	Lane	Canoer	Country	Time	Notes
1	5	Wiktor Głazunow	Poland	3:48.40	SF
2	6	Zakhar Petrov	Individual Neutral Athletes	3:49.86	SF
3	4	José Ramón Pelier	Cuba	3:52.17	QF
4	3	Nicolae Craciun	Italy	3:53.90	QF
5	7	Ji Bowen	China	4:02.85	QF

Heat 2

Rank	Lane	Canoer	Country	Time	Notes
1	5	Martin Fuksa	Czech Republic	3:50.39	SF
2	4	Isaquias Queiroz	Brazil	3:53.94	SF
3	3	Fernando Jorge	Refugee Olympic Team	3:54.90	QF
4	7	Dániel Fejes	Hungary	3:56.00	QF
5	6	Pablo Crespo	Spain	4:05.05	QF

Heat 3

Rank	Lane	Canoer	Country	Time	Notes
1	4	Cătălin Chirilă	Romania	3:44.75	SF, OB
2	5	Adrien Bart	France	3:46.93	SF
3	7	Carlo Tacchini	Italy	3:59.59	QF
4	3	Sergey Yemelyanov	Kazakhstan	4:05.31	QF
5	6	Pavlo Altukhov	Ukraine	4:11.32	QF

Heat 4

Rank	Lane	Canoer	Country	Time	Notes
1	4	Serghei Tarnovschi	Moldova	3:49.27	SF
2	5	Connor Fitzpatrick	Canada	3:50.79	SF
3	7	Mateus Nunes Bastos	Brazil	3:52.60	QF
4	3	Lai Kuan-chieh	Chinese Taipei	4:01.26	QF
5	6	Ghailene Khattali	Tunisia	4:23.05	QF

Heat 5

Rank	Lane	Canoer	Country	Time	Notes
1	5	Sebastian Brendel	Germany	3:45.48	SF
2	7	Liu Hao	China	3:45.85	SF
3	4	Balázs Adolf	Hungary	3:48.21	QF
4	6	Mohammad Nabi Rezaei	Iran	4:10.36	QF
5	3	Benilson Sanda	Angola	4:11.40	QF

=== Quarterfinals ===
Progression System: 1st-2nd to SF, rest out.

Quarterfinal 1

Rank	Lane	Canoer	Country	Time	Notes
1	6	Dániel Fejes	Hungary	3:47.88	SF
2	5	José Ramón Pelier	Cuba	3:49.41	SF
3	7	Pavlo Altukhov	Ukraine	3:51.58	
4	3	Mohammad Nabi Rezaei	Iran	3:52.41	
5	4	Mateus Nunes Bastos	Brazil	4:08.50	

Quarterfinal 2

Rank	Lane	Canoer	Country	Time	Notes
1	5	Carlo Tacchini	Italy	3:49.15	SF
2	3	Pablo Crespo	Spain	3:50.24	SF
3	4	Nicolae Craciun	Italy	3:53.13	
4	6	Lai Kuan-chieh	Chinese Taipei	3:58.79	
5	7	Benilson Sanda	Angola	4:12.73	

Quarterfinal 3

Rank	Lane	Canoer	Country	Time	Notes
1	5	Balázs Adolf	Hungary	3:53.65	SF
2	3	Ji Bowen	China	3:56.36	SF
3	6	Sergey Yemelyanov	Kazakhstan	3:59.68	
4	4	Fernando Jorge	Refugee Olympic Team	4:06.63	
5	7	Ghailene Khattali	Tunisia	4:28.44	

=== Semifinals ===
Progression: 1st-4th to Final A, rest to Final B.

Semifinal 1

Rank	Lane	Canoer	Country	Time	Notes
1	3	Sebastian Brendel	Germany	3:44.78	FA
2	6	Isaquias Queiroz	Brazil	3:44.80	FA
3	5	Wiktor Głazunow	Poland	3:45.30	FA
4	7	Carlo Tacchini	Italy	3:45.42	FA
5	4	Cătălin Chirilă	Romania	3:45.78	FB
6	1	José Ramón Pelier	Cuba	3:46.37	FB
7	8	Ji Bowen	China	3:46.48	FB
8	2	Connor Fitzpatrick	Canada	3:56.31	FB

Semifinal 2

Rank	Lane	Canoer	Country	Time	Notes
1	4	Martin Fuksa	Czech Republic	3:44.69	FA, OB
2	5	Serghei Tarnovschi	Moldova	3:45.33	FA
3	3	Zakhar Petrov	Individual Neutral Athletes	3:45.99	FA
4	8	Balázs Adolf	Hungary	3:46.61	FA
5	7	Dániel Fejes	Hungary	3:47.83	FB
6	6	Adrien Bart	France	3:49.56	FB
7	2	Liu Hao	China	4:01.95	FB
8	1	Pablo Crespo	Spain	4:03.04	FB

=== Finals ===
Final A

Rank	Lane	Canoer	Country	Time	Notes
1st place, gold medalist(s)	4	Martin Fuksa	Czech Republic	3:43.16	OB
2nd place, silver medalist(s)	3	Isaquias Queiroz	Brazil	3:44.33	
3rd place, bronze medalist(s)	6	Serghei Tarnovschi	Moldova	3:44.68	
4	2	Zakhar Petrov	Individual Neutral Athletes	3:45.28	
5	1	Carlo Tacchini	Italy	3:48.97	
6	7	Wiktor Głazunow	Poland	3:49.05	
7	8	Balázs Adolf	Hungary	3:49.83	
8	5	Sebastian Brendel	Germany	3:51.44	

Final B

Rank	Lane	Canoer	Country	Time	Notes
9	5	Cătălin Chirilă	Romania	3:47.48	
10	3	José Ramón Pelier	Cuba	3:48.58	
11	4	Dániel Fejes	Hungary	3:50.22	
12	8	Pablo Crespo	Spain	3:50.54	
13	2	Liu Hao	China	3:52.25	
14	1	Connor Fitzpatrick	Canada	3:52.46	
15	7	Ji Bowen	China	3:58.13	
16	6	Adrien Bart	France	3:59.82	
