= 2025 ICF Canoe Sprint World Championships – Men's C-1 1000 metres =

Men's C-1 1000 metres at the 2025 ICF Canoe Sprint World Championships
- Venue: Idroscalo Regatta Course
- Location: Milan, Italy
- Dates: 20–23 August
- Competitors: 27 from 27 nations
- Winning time: 3:46.09

Medalists
gold medal	Martin Fuksa	Czech Republic
silver medal	Stefanos Dimopoulos	Greece
bronze medal	Balázs Adolf	Hungary

The men's C-1 1000 metres competition at the 2025 ICF Canoe Sprint World Championships in Milan took place in Idroscalo Regatta Course.

== Schedule ==
The schedule is as follows:

Date	Time	Round
Wednesday 20 August 2025	13:22	Heats
Friday 22 August 2025	09:56	Semifinals
Saturday 23 August 2025	14:18	Final B
Saturday 23 August 2025	14:48	Final A

== Results ==
=== Heats ===
The fastest boat in each heat advanced directly to the final (QF). The next six fastest boats in each heat advanced to the semifinal (QS).

==== Heat 1 ====
Rank	Canoeist	Country	Time	Notes
1	Martin Fuksa	Czech Republic	3:46.32	QF
2	Serghei Tarnovschi	Moldova	3:47.82	QS
3	Pablo Crespo	Spain	3:48.38	QS
4	Ivan Patapenka	Individual Neutral Athletes	3:50.15	QS
5	Wu Shengyue	China	3:50.17	QS
6	Thomas Lambert	Great Britain	4:05.74	QS
7	Hwang Seon-hong	South Korea	4:07.22	QS
8	Hikaru Sato	Japan	4:10.81	
9	Alejandro Rodríguez	Colombia	4:25.76	

==== Heat 2 ====
Rank	Canoeist	Country	Time	Notes
1	Stefanos Dimopoulos	Greece	3:50.40	QF
2	Vladlen Denisov	Uzbekistan	3:55.89	QS
3	Balázs Adolf	Hungary	3:57.46	QS
4	Jonathan Grady	United States	4:00.48	QS
5	Pavlo Altukhov	Ukraine	4:00.66	QS
6	Lucas Laroche	France	4:01.46	QS
7	Peter Kizek	Slovakia	4:10.76	QS
8	Joosep Karlson	Estonia	4:13.60	
9	Amirjon Bobojonov	Tajikistan	4:15.83	

==== Heat 3 ====
Rank	Canoeist	Country	Time	Notes
1	David Bauschke	Germany	3:52.31	QF
2	Wiktor Glazunow	Poland	3:53.56	QS
3	Cătălin Chirilă	Romania	3:56.58	QS
4	Ilya Pervukhin	Individual Neutral Athletes	3:58.38	QS
5	Connor Fitzpatrick	Canada	4:01.36	QS
6	Nicolae Craciun	Italy	4:09.93	QS
7	Gyaneshwor Singh Philem	India	4:11.33	QS
8	Preslav Georgiev	Bulgaria	4:13.63	
9	Benilson Sanda	Angola	4:25.40	

=== Semifinals ===
The fastest three boats in each semi advanced to the A final. The next four fastest boats in each semi and best 8th advanced to the final B.

==== Semifinal 1 ====
Rank	Canoeist	Country	Time	Notes
1	Balázs Adolf	Hungary	3:56.16	FA
2	Cătălin Chirilă	Romania	3:56.22	FA
3	Serghei Tarnovschi	Moldova	3:56.89	FA
4	Ivan Patapenka	Individual Neutral Athletes	3:57.63	FB
5	Ilya Pervukhin	Individual Neutral Athletes	4:01.03	FB
6	Pavlo Altukhov	Ukraine	4:05.43	FB
7	Thomas Lambert	Great Britain	4:06.33	FB
8	Peter Kizek	Slovakia	4:09.15	fB
9	Nicolae Craciun	Italy	4:17.69	

==== Semifinal 2 ====
Rank	Canoeist	Country	Time	Notes
1	Wiktor Glazunow	Poland	3:58.31	FA
2	Pablo Crespo	Spain	3:58.76	FA
3	Wu Shengyue	China	3:59.69	FA
4	Connor Fitzpatrick	Canada	4:00.93	FB
5	Vladlen Denisov	Uzbekistan	4:06.93	FB
6	Lucas Laroche	France	4:11.23	FB
7	Jonathan Grady	United States	4:15.48	FB
8	Gyaneshwor Singh Philem	India	4:23.36	
9	Hwang Seon-hong	South Korea	5:05.26	

=== Finals ===
==== Final B ====
Competitors in this final raced for positions 10 to 18.

Rank	Canoeist	Country	Time	Notes
1	Ivan Patapenka	Individual Neutral Athletes	3:55.43	
2	Ilya Pervukhin	Individual Neutral Athletes	3:56.09	
3	Connor Fitzpatrick	Canada	3:59.38	
4	Vladlen Denisov	Uzbekistan	3:59.64	
5	Pavlo Altukhov	Ukraine	4:01.63	
6	Jonathan Grady	United States	4:03.18	
7	Thomas Lambert	Great Britain	4:08.11	
8	Peter Kizek	Slovakia	4:10.01	
9	Lucas Laroche	France	4:10.73	

==== Final A ====
Competitors raced for positions 1 to 9, with medals going to the top three.

Rank	Canoeist	Country	Time	Notes
1st place, gold medalist(s)	Martin Fuksa	Czech Republic	3:46.09	
2nd place, silver medalist(s)	Stefanos Dimopoulos	Greece	3:47.92	
3rd place, bronze medalist(s)	Balázs Adolf	Hungary	3:49.40	
4	Cătălin Chirilă	Romania	3:49.56	
5	Pablo Crespo	Spain	3:49.92	
6	Wiktor Glazunow	Poland	3:51.63	
7	David Bauschke	Germany	3:51.78	
8	Serghei Tarnovschi	Moldova	3:52.78	
9	Wu Shengyue	China	3:59.22	
