= 2023 ICF Canoe Sprint World Championships – Men's C-1 500 metres =

Men's C-1 500 metres at the 2023 ICF Canoe Sprint World Championships
- Venue: Sportpark Duisburg
- Location: Duisburg, Germany
- Dates: 23–25 August
- Competitors: 31 from 31 nations
- Winning time: 1:45.373

Medalists
gold medal	Cătălin Chirilă	Romania
silver medal	Conrad-Robin Scheibner	Germany
bronze medal	Serghei Tarnovschi	Moldova

The men's C-1 500 metres competition at the 2023 ICF Canoe Sprint World Championships in Duisburg took place in Sportpark Duisburg.

== Schedule ==
The schedule is as follows:

Date	Time	Round
Wednesday 23 August 2023	11:55	Heats
Friday 25 August 2023	13:27	Semifinals
Friday 25 August 2023	18:08	Final A
Friday 25 August 2023	19:08	Final B

== Results ==
=== Heats ===
The fastest six boats in each heat, plus the fastest three remaining boats, advanced to the semi-finals.

==== Heat 1 ====
Rank	Canoeist	Country	Time	Notes
1	Cătălin Chirilă	Romania	1:47.349	QS
2	Pavlo Altukhov	Ukraine	1:49.193	QS
3	Dániel Fejes	Hungary	1:49.460	QS
4	Andrew Billard	Canada	1:50.975	QS
5	Alejandro Rodríguez	Colombia	1:51.650	QS
6	Jonathan Grady	United States	1:55.671	QS
7	Gevorg Pilosyan	Armenia	2:00.529	QS
8	Mohamed Ali Merzougui	Algeria	2:02.735	
	Josephat Ngali	Kenya	DNS	

==== Heat 2 ====
Rank	Canoeist	Country	Time	Notes
1	Serghei Tarnovschi	Moldova	1:47.653	QS
2	Conrad-Robin Scheibner	Germany	1:47.744	QS
3	Adrian Sieiro	Spain	1:50.992	QS
4	Manfred Pallinger	Austria	1:53.611	QS
5	Michael Martínez	Chile	1:54.092	QS
6	Michael Akpos Moses	Nigeria	2:09.726	QS
7	Kelvi Nazare	São Tomé and Príncipe	2:19.185	
	Mussa Chamaune	Mozambique	DNS	

==== Heat 3 ====
Rank	Canoeist	Country	Time	Notes
1	Filipe Santana	Brazil	39.812	QS
2	Sergey Yemelyanov	Kazakhstan	40.779	QS
3	Dominik Nowacki	Poland	41.147	QS
4	Yu Chenwei	China	42.938	QS
5	Ali Aldain	Iraq	43.368	QS
6	Cristian Sola	Ecuador	45.935	QS
7	Sunil Singh Salam	India	1:58.407	QS
8	Manuel António	Angola	2:04.582	
	Edwar Paredes	Venezuela	DNS	

==== Heat 4 ====
Rank	Canoeist	Country	Time	Notes
1	Jiří Minařík	Czech Republic	1:48.721	QS
2	Mohammad Nabi Rezaei	Iran	1:49.990	QS
3	Angel Kodinov	Bulgaria	1:50.627	QS
4	Benjamin Manning	Australia	1:50.862	QS
5	Javier Requeiro	Cuba	1:56.379	QS
6	Gia Gabedava	Georgia	2:01.871	QS
7	Dario Maksimovic	Luxembourg	2:02.942	QS
8	Umar Rustamov	Tajikistan	2:09.741	

=== Semifinal ===
The fastest three boats in each semi advanced to the A final.
The next three fastest boats in each semi advanced to the final B.

==== Semifinal 1 ====
Rank	Canoeist	Country	Time	Notes
1	Cătălin Chirilă	Moldova	1:46.861	QA
2	Conrad-Robin Scheibner	Germany	1:47.994	QA
3	Sergey Yemelyanov	Kazakhstan	1:49.858	QA
4	Angel Kodinov	Bulgaria	1:50.221	QB
5	Benjamin Manning	Australia	1:51.763	QB
6	Alejandro Rodríguez	Colombia	1:58.618	QB
7	Sunil Singh Salam	India	2:01.454	
8	Michael Akpos Moses	Nigeria	2:12.198	
9	Ali Aldain	Iraq	2:24.030	

==== Semifinal 2 ====
Rank	Canoeist	Country	Time	Notes
1	Serghei Tarnovschi	Moldova	1:47.246	QA
2	Yu Chenwei	China	1:48.177	QA
3	Dániel Fejes	Hungary	1:48.534	QA
4	Mohammad Nabi Rezaei	Iran	1:50.106	QB
5	Andrew Billard	Canada	1:51.398	QB
6	Dominik Nowacki	Poland	1:51.526	QB
7	Michael Martínez	Chile	1:54.492	
8	Gevorg Pilosyan	Armenia	2:02.383	
9	Gia Gabedava	Georgia	2:05.003	

==== Semifinal 3 ====
Rank	Canoeist	Country	Time	Notes
1	Pavlo Altukhov	Ukraine	1:48.245	QA
2	Jiří Minařík	Czech Republic	1:48.341	QA
3	Adrian Sieiro	Spain	1:48.531	QA
4	Filipe Santana	Brazil	1:49.235	QB
5	Manfred Pallinger	Austria	1:51.184	QB
6	Cristian Sola	Ecuador	1:54.419	QB
7	Jonathan Grady	United States	1:56.315	
8	Javier Requeiro	Cuba	1:59.486	
9	Dario Maksimovic	Luxembourg	2:07.565	

=== Final B ===
Competitors in this final raced for positions 10 to 18.

Rank	Canoeist	Country	Time
1	Filipe Santana	Brazil	1:50.633
2	Dominik Nowacki	Poland	1:52.011
3	Angel Kodinov	Bulgaria	1:52.413
4	Andrew Billard	Canada	1:52.861
5	Alejandro Rodríguez	Colombia	1:53.415
6	Mohammad Nabi Rezaei	Iran	1:53.506
7	Manfred Pallinger	Austria	1:53.719
8	Benjamin Manning	Australia	1:54.363
9	Cristian Sola	Ecuador	1:57.525

=== Final A ===
Competitors raced for positions 1 to 9, with medals going to the top three.

Rank	Canoeist	Country	Time
1st place, gold medalist(s)	Cătălin Chirilă	Romania	1:45.373
2nd place, silver medalist(s)	Conrad-Robin Scheibner	Germany	1:45.723
3rd place, bronze medalist(s)	Serghei Tarnovschi	Moldova	1:46.746
4	Jiří Minařík	Czech Republic	1:47.697
5	Adrian Sieiro	Spain	1:47.961
6	Yu Chenwei	China	1:48.148
6	Pavlo Altukhov	Ukraine	1:48.148
8	Dániel Fejes	Hungary	1:48.477
9	Sergey Yemelyanov	Kazakhstan	1:50.043
