= 2022 ICF Canoe Sprint World Championships – Men's C-1 500 metres =

Men's C-1 500 metres at the 2022 ICF Canoe Sprint World Championships
- Venue: Lake Banook
- Location: Dartmouth, Canada
- Dates: 3–6 August
- Competitors: 21 from 21 nations
- Winning time: 1:54.49

Medalists
gold medal	Isaquias Queiroz	Brazil
silver medal	Cătălin Chirilă	Romania
bronze medal	Martin Fuksa	Czech Republic

The men's C-1 500 metres competition at the 2022 ICF Canoe Sprint World Championships in Dartmouth took place on Lake Banook.

== Schedule ==
The schedule is as follows:

Date	Time	Round
Wednesday 3 August 2022	15:54	Heats
Friday 5 August 2022	12:33	Semifinals
Saturday 6 August 2022	12:35	Final A
Saturday 6 August 2022	15:00	Final B

== Results ==
=== Heats ===
The fastest boat in each heat advanced directly to the A final.
The next six fastest boats in each heat advanced to the semifinals.

==== Heat 1 ====
Rank	Canoeist	Country	Time	Notes
1	Catalin Chirila	Romania	1:50.27	QA
2	Angel Kodinov	Bulgaria	1:50.73	QS
3	Martin Fuksa	Czech Republic	1:51.96	QS
4	Zheng Pengfei	China	1:53.05	QS
5	Manuel Fontan	Spain	1:56.53	QS
6	Moritz Adam	Germany	1:56.86	QS
7	Matej Rusnák	Slovakia	1:56.93	QS
8	Aoto Yabu	Japan	2:00.00	

==== Heat 2 ====
Rank	Canoeist	Country	Time	Notes
1	Pavlo Altukhov	Ukraine	1:55.46	QA
2	Roberts Lagzdins	Latvia	1:57.22	QS
3	Andrew Billard	Canada	1:59.20	QS
4	Ian Ross	United States	1:59.75	QS
5	Guillermo Quirino	Mexico	1:59.95	QS
	Sergio Díaz	Colombia	DNS	

==== Heat 3 ====
Rank	Canoeist	Country	Time	Notes
1	Isaquias Queiroz	Brazil	1:52.70	QA
2	Carlo Tacchini	Italy	1:55.52	QS
3	Aleksander Kitewski	Poland	1:56.25	QS
4	Dániel Fejes	Hungary	1:57.28	QS
5	Lai Kuan-chieh	Chinese Taipei	1:57.30	QS
6	Joosep Karlson	Estonia	1:59.45	QS
7	Ghailene Kattali	Tunisia	2:07.85	QS

=== Semifinal ===
The fastest three boats in each semi advanced to the A final.
The next four fastest boats in each semi, plus the fastest remaining boat advanced to the final B.

==== Semifinal 1 ====
Rank	Canoeist	Country	Time	Notes
1	Martin Fuksa	Czech Republic	1:53.78	QA
2	Carlo Tacchini	Italy	1:54.98	QA
3	Moritz Adam	Germany	1:55.47	QA
4	Manuel Fontan	Spain	1:55.84	QB
5	Dániel Fejes	Hungary	1:58.22	QB
6	Andrew Billard	Canada	1:59.22	QB
7	Ian Ross	United States	1:59.99	QB
8	Ghailene Kattali	Tunisia	2:05.59	

==== Semifinal 2 ====
Rank	Canoeist	Country	Time	Notes
1	Angel Kodinov	Bulgaria	1:53.67	QA
2	Zheng Pengfei	China	1:54.36	QA
3	Aleksander Kitewski	Poland	1:56.69	QA
4	Lai Kuan-chieh	Chinese Taipei	1:56.99	QB
5	Matej Rusnák	Slovakia	1:57.91	QB
6	Joosep Karlson	Estonia	2:00.19	QB
7	Roberts Lagzdins	Latvia	2:01.41	QB
8	Guillermo Quirino	Mexico	2:02.09	qB

=== Finals ===
==== Final B ====
Competitors in this final raced for positions 10 to 18.

Rank	Canoeist	Country	Time
1	Manuel Fontan	Spain	2:01.11
2	Lai Kuan-chieh	Chinese Taipei	2:02.37
3	Dániel Fejes	Hungary	2:02.79
4	Matej Rusnák	Slovakia	2:03.16
5	Andrew Billard	Canada	2:03.88
6	Joosep Karlson	Estonia	2:04.73
7	Roberts Lagzdins	Latvia	2:05.13
8	Guillermo Quirino	Mexico	2:05.43
9	Ian Ross	United States	2:09.23

==== Final A ====
Competitors in this final raced for positions 1 to 9, with medals going to the top three.

Rank	Canoeist	Country	Time
1st place, gold medalist(s)	Isaquias Queiroz	Brazil	1:54.49
2nd place, silver medalist(s)	Catalin Chirila	Romania	1:56.51
3rd place, bronze medalist(s)	Martin Fuksa	Czech Republic	1:56.79
4	Angel Kodinov	Bulgaria	1:57.13
5	Zheng Pengfei	China	1:57.40
6	Carlo Tacchini	Italy	1:57.86
7	Pavlo Altukhov	Ukraine	1:59.05
8	Aleksander Kitewski	Poland	1:59.65
9	Moritz Adam	Germany	2:03.16
