= 2019 ICF Canoe Sprint World Championships – Men's C-1 500 metres =

Men's C-1 500 metres at the 2019 ICF Canoe Sprint World Championships
- Venue: Olympic Centre of Szeged
- Location: Szeged, Hungary
- Dates: 22–24 August
- Competitors: 35 from 35 nations
- Winning time: 1:53.59

Medalists
gold medal	Sebastian Brendel	Germany
silver medal	Angel Kodinov	Bulgaria
bronze medal	Oleg Tarnovschi	Moldova

The men's C-1 500 metres competition at the 2019 ICF Canoe Sprint World Championships in Szeged took place at the Olympic Centre of Szeged.

== Schedule ==
The schedule was as follows:

Date	Time	Round
Thursday 22 August 2019	11:55	Heats
Friday 23 August 2019	12:03	Semifinals
Saturday 24 August 2019	09:31	Final B
Saturday 24 August 2019	12:40	Final A

All times are Central European Summer Time (UTC+2)

== Results ==
=== Heats ===
The six fastest boats in each heat, plus the three fastest seventh-place boats advanced to the semifinals.

==== Heat 1 ====
Rank	Canoeist	Country	Time	Notes
1	Thomas Simart	France	1:47.54	QS
2	Lai Kuan-chieh	Chinese Taipei	1:48.54	QS
3	Angel Kodinov	Bulgaria	1:48.62	QS
4	András Bodonyi	Hungary	1:48.89	QS
5	Shahriyor Daminov	Tajikistan	1:50.42	QS
6	Joosep Karlson	Estonia	1:50.44	QS
7	Štefo Lutz	Croatia	1:51.11	qS
8	Phanuphong Jiranarongchai	Thailand	1:57.28	
9	Leon Mussell	Cook Islands	2:46.30	

==== Heat 2 ====
Rank	Canoeist	Country	Time	Notes
1	Pavlo Altukhov	Ukraine	1:49.93	QS
2	David Barreiro	Spain	1:50.80	QS
3	Xu Jiabin	China	1:51.02	QS
4	Vladlen Denisov	Uzbekistan	1:51.85	QS
5	Manfred Pallinger	Austria	1:52.28	QS
6	Ian Ross	United States	1:52.30	QS
7	Ghailene Khattali	Tunisia	1:53.80	qS
8	Edwar Paredes	Venezuela	1:55.44	
9	Dario Maksimovic	Luxembourg	2:13.88	

==== Heat 3 ====
Rank	Canoeist	Country	Time	Notes
1	Sebastian Brendel	Germany	1:47.32	QS
2	Wiktor Głazunow	Poland	1:48.29	QS
3	Filip Dvořák	Czech Republic	1:48.40	QS
4	Oleg Tarnovschi	Moldova	1:50.77	QS
5	Gaurav Tomar	India	1:52.21	QS
6	Nicolae Craciun	Italy	1:56.05	QS
7	Chin Chuen Tan	Singapore	2:04.96	
8	Gia Gabedava	Georgia	2:07.32	
9	Josephat Ngali	Kenya	2:10.94	

==== Heat 4 ====
Rank	Canoeist	Country	Time	Notes
1	Mikhail Karpov	Russia	1:48.31	QS
2	Ștefan-Andrei Strat	Romania	1:49.56	QS
3	Matej Rusnák	Slovakia	1:50.71	QS
4	Kim Tae-eun	South Korea	1:53.38	QS
5	Ara Virabyan	Armenia	1:56.72	QS
6	Velibor Marinkovic	Bosnia and Herzegovina	1:57.17	QS
7	Joaquim Lobo	Mozambique	2:01.05	qS
–	Gaona Grifa Beldin	Peru	DNS	

=== Semifinals ===
Qualification in each semi was as follows:

The fastest three boats advanced to the A final.
The next three fastest boats advanced to the B final.

==== Semifinal 1 ====
Rank	Canoeist	Country	Time	Notes
1	Wiktor Głazunow	Poland	1:47.74	QA
2	Thomas Simart	France	1:49.18	QA
3	David Barreiro	Spain	1:49.32	QA
4	Matej Rusnák	Slovakia	1:49.74	QB
5	Ian Ross	United States	1:51.93	QB
6	Gaurav Tomar	India	1:52.43	QB
7	Kim Tae-eun	South Korea	1:52.53	
8	Štefo Lutz	Croatia	1:53.06	
9	Shahriyor Daminov	Tajikistan	1:56.21	

==== Semifinal 2 ====
Rank	Canoeist	Country	Time	Notes
1	Filip Dvořák	Czech Republic	1:47.22	QA
2	Oleg Tarnovschi	Moldova	1:47.77	QA
3	Angel Kodinov	Bulgaria	1:48.34	QA
4	Pavlo Altukhov	Ukraine	1:48.75	QB
5	András Bodonyi	Hungary	1:49.18	QB
6	Ștefan-Andrei Strat	Romania	1:51.85	QB
7	Manfred Pallinger	Austria	1:54.17	
8	Ghailene Khattali	Tunisia	1:54.54	
9	Velibor Marinkovic	Bosnia and Herzegovina	1:58.17	

==== Semifinal 3 ====
Rank	Canoeist	Country	Time	Notes
1	Mikhail Karpov	Russia	1:46.98	QA
2	Sebastian Brendel	Germany	1:47.17	QA
3	Lai Kuan-chieh	Chinese Taipei	1:47.67	QA
4	Nicolae Craciun	Italy	1:47.75	QB
5	Xu Jiabin	China	1:49.30	QB
6	Joosep Karlson	Estonia	1:49.99	QB
7	Vladlen Denisov	Uzbekistan	1:52.71	
8	Ara Virabyan	Armenia	1:58.29	
9	Joaquim Lobo	Mozambique	2:01.44	

=== Finals ===
==== Final B ====
Competitors in this final raced for positions 10 to 18.

Rank	Canoeist	Country	Time
1	Nicolae Craciun	Italy	1:53.17
2	Pavlo Altukhov	Ukraine	1:53.41
3	Xu Jiabin	China	1:55.36
4	Matej Rusnák	Slovakia	1:55.72
5	András Bodonyi	Hungary	1:56.30
6	Joosep Karlson	Estonia	1:57.28
7	Ștefan-Andrei Strat	Romania	1:57.88
8	Gaurav Tomar	India	1:58.17
9	Ian Ross	United States	2:00.59

==== Final A ====
Competitors raced for positions 1 to 9, with medals going to the top three.

Rank	Canoeist	Country	Time
1st place, gold medalist(s)	Sebastian Brendel	Germany	1:53.59
2nd place, silver medalist(s)	Angel Kodinov	Bulgaria	1:54.49
3rd place, bronze medalist(s)	Oleg Tarnovschi	Moldova	1:54.94
4	Wiktor Głazunow	Poland	1:55.28
5	Mikhail Karpov	Russia	1:55.79
6	Filip Dvořák	Czech Republic	1:56.18
7	Thomas Simart	France	1:56.21
8	David Barreiro	Spain	1:59.56
9	Lai Kuan-chieh	Chinese Taipei	2:00.36
