= 2017 ICF Canoe Sprint World Championships – Men's C-1 500 metres =

Men's C-1 500 metres at the 2017 ICF Canoe Sprint World Championships
- Venue: Sportcentrum Račice
- Location: Račice, Czech Republic
- Dates: 25–27 August
- Competitors: 18 from 18 nations
- Winning time: 1:49.725

Medalists
gold medal	Martin Fuksa	Czech Republic
silver medal	Carlo Tacchini	Italy
bronze medal	Maksim Piatrou	Belarus

The men's C-1 500 metres competition at the 2017 ICF Canoe Sprint World Championships in Račice took place at the Sportcentrum Račice.

== Schedule ==
The schedule was as follows:

Date	Time	Round
Friday 25 August 2017	11:08	Heats
Friday 25 August 2017	16:30	Semifinals
Sunday 27 August 2017	09:43	Final B
Sunday 27 August 2017	11:33	Final A

All times are Central European Summer Time (UTC+2)

== Results ==
=== Heats ===
Heat winners advanced directly to the A final. The next six fastest boats in each heat advanced to the semifinals.

==== Heat 1 ====
Rank	Canoeist	Country	Time	Notes
1	Martin Fuksa	Czech Republic	1:49.947	QA
2	Vadim Menkov	Uzbekistan	1:50.692	QS
3	Ádám Fekete	Hungary	1:52.475	QS
4	David Fernández	Spain	1:54.919	QS
5	Angel Kodinov	Bulgaria	1:58.208	QS
6	Stefanos Dimopoulos	Greece	1:58.397	QS
7	Štefo Lutz	Croatia	2:14.530	QS

==== Heat 2 ====
Rank	Canoeist	Country	Time	Notes
1	Carlo Tacchini	Italy	1:51.001	QA
2	Takayuki Kokaji	Japan	1:55.307	QS
3	Oleksandr Maksymchuk	Ukraine	1:58.018	QS
4	Matej Rusnák	Slovakia	1:59.212	QS
5	Jan Vandrey	Germany	2:00.540	QS
6	Ali Dherar Kadhim Al Dain	Iraq	2:04.907	QS

==== Heat 3 ====
Rank	Canoeist	Country	Time	Notes
1	Tomasz Kaczor	Poland	1:48.913	QA
2	Maksim Piatrou	Belarus	1:52.469	QS
3	Ilia Shtokalov	Russia	1:53.130	QS
4	Mikhail Yemelyanov	Kazakhstan	1:59.736	QS
5	Joosep Karlson	Estonia	2:06.275	QS

=== Semifinals ===
Qualification was as follows:

The fastest three boats in each semi advanced to the A final.
The next four fastest boats in each semi, plus the fastest remaining boat advanced to the B final.

==== Semifinal 1 ====
Rank	Canoeist	Country	Time	Notes
1	Vadim Menkov	Uzbekistan	1:50.926	QA
2	Ilia Shtokalov	Russia	1:51.293	QA
3	Jan Vandrey	Germany	1:52.321	QA
4	Stefanos Dimopoulos	Greece	1:53.810	QB
5	David Fernández	Spain	1:54.010	QB
6	Oleksandr Maksymchuk	Ukraine	1:55.221	QB
7	Mikhail Yemelyanov	Kazakhstan	2:06.188	QB

==== Semifinal 2 ====
Rank	Canoeist	Country	Time	Notes
1	Maksim Piatrou	Belarus	1:52.166	QA
2	Angel Kodinov	Bulgaria	1:53.450	QA
3	Ádám Fekete	Hungary	1:53.722	QA
4	Matej Rusnák	Slovakia	1:54.172	QB
5	Štefo Lutz	Croatia	1:59.272	QB
6	Takayuki Kokaji	Japan	2:00.827	QB
7	Joosep Karlson	Estonia	2:02.544	QB
8	Ali Dherar Kadhim Al Dain	Iraq	2:04.883	qB

=== Finals ===
==== Final B ====
Competitors in this final raced for positions 10 to 18.

Rank	Canoeist	Country	Time
1	David Fernández	Spain	1:52.430
2	Stefanos Dimopoulos	Greece	1:52.714
3	Matej Rusnák	Slovakia	1:54.580
4	Oleksandr Maksymchuk	Ukraine	1:54.653
5	Mikhail Yemelyanov	Kazakhstan	1:56.219
6	Takayuki Kokaji	Japan	1:56.403
7	Štefo Lutz	Croatia	1:57.397
8	Joosep Karlson	Estonia	1:57.986
9	Ali Dherar Kadhim Al Dain	Iraq	2:03.325

==== Final A ====
Competitors in this final raced for positions 1 to 9, with medals going to the top three.

Rank	Canoeist	Country	Time
1st place, gold medalist(s)	Martin Fuksa	Czech Republic	1:49.725
2nd place, silver medalist(s)	Carlo Tacchini	Italy	1:50.309
3rd place, bronze medalist(s)	Maksim Piatrou	Belarus	1:50.583
4	Tomasz Kaczor	Poland	1:50.898
5	Vadim Menkov	Uzbekistan	1:50.940
6	Jan Vandrey	Germany	1:51.593
7	Ilia Shtokalov	Russia	1:51.651
8	Angel Kodinov	Bulgaria	1:53.367
9	Ádám Fekete	Hungary	1:56.693
