= 2021 ICF Canoe Sprint World Championships – Men's C-1 500 metres =

Men's C-1 500 metres at the 2021 ICF Canoe Sprint World Championships
- Venue: Lake Bagsværd
- Location: Copenhagen, Denmark
- Dates: 17–19 September
- Competitors: 16 from 16 nations
- Winning time: 1:46.55

Medalists
gold medal	Conrad-Robin Scheibner	Germany
silver medal	Martin Fuksa	Czech Republic
bronze medal	Oleg Tarnovschi	Moldova
bronze medal	Carlo Tacchini	Italy

The men's C-1 500 metres competition at the 2021 ICF Canoe Sprint World Championships in Copenhagen took place on Lake Bagsværd.

== Schedule ==
The schedule was as follows:

Date	Time	Round
Friday 17 September 2021	11:56	Heats
Saturday 18 September 2021	14:00	Semifinal
Sunday 19 September 2021	12:06	Final

All times are Central European Summer Time (UTC+2)

== Results ==
=== Heats ===
The fastest three boats in each heat advanced directly to the final.
The next four fastest boats in each heat, plus the fastest remaining boat advanced to the semifinal.

==== Heat 1 ====
Rank	Canoeist	Country	Time	Notes
1	Maksim Piatrou	Belarus	1:51.39	QF
2	Oleg Tarnovschi	Moldova	1:51.68	QF
3	Mateusz Kamiński	Poland	1:52.54	QF
4	Carlo Tacchini	Italy	1:52.77	QS
5	Taras Mishchuk	Ukraine	1:53.13	QS
6	Craig Spence	Canada	1:55.83	QS
7	Manuel Fontán	Spain	1:55.97	QS
8	Joosep Karlson	Estonia	1:58.82	qS

==== Heat 2 ====
Rank	Canoeist	Country	Time	Notes
1	Martin Fuksa	Czech Republic	1:50.69	QF
2	Conrad-Robin Scheibner	Germany	1:51.63	QF
3	José Ramón Pelier	Cuba	1:52.40	QF
4	Balázs Kiss	Hungary	1:53.94	QS
5	Dmitrii Sharov	RCF	1:54.47	QS
6	Adel Mojallali	Iran	1:54.70	QS
7	Hélder Silva	Portugal	1:57.01	QS
8	Angel Kodinov	Bulgaria	1:59.62	

=== Semifinal ===
The fastest three boats advanced to the final.

Rank	Canoeist	Country	Time	Notes
1	Carlo Tacchini	Italy	1:50.18	QF
2	Adel Mojallali	Iran	1:50.29	QF
3	Taras Mishchuk	Ukraine	1:50.47	QF
4	Balázs Kiss	Hungary	1:50.96	
5	Craig Spence	Canada	1:52.10	
6	Dmitrii Sharov	RCF	1:52.77	
7	Manuel Fontán	Spain	1:53.98	
8	Hélder Silva	Portugal	1:54.13	
9	Joosep Karlson	Estonia	1:56.76	

=== Final ===
Competitors in this final raced for positions 1 to 9, with medals going to the top four as two boats were tied for third place.

Rank	Canoeist	Country	Time
1st place, gold medalist(s)	Conrad-Robin Scheibner	Germany	1:46.55
2nd place, silver medalist(s)	Martin Fuksa	Czech Republic	1:47.58
3rd place, bronze medalist(s)	Oleg Tarnovschi	Moldova	1:48.50
3rd place, bronze medalist(s)	Carlo Tacchini	Italy	1:48.50
5	Maksim Piatrou	Belarus	1:49.35
6	Mateusz Kamiński	Poland	1:49.60
7	Taras Mishchuk	Ukraine	1:50.07
8	Adel Mojallali	Iran	1:50.48
9	José Ramón Pelier	Cuba	1:50.57
