= 2024 ICF Canoe Sprint World Championships – Men's C-1 500 metres =

Men's C-1 500 metres at the 2024 ICF Canoe Sprint World Championships
- Venue: Rowing and Canoeing Race Course in Samarkand
- Location: Samarkand, Uzbekistan
- Dates: 23–25 August
- Competitors: 26 from 25 nations
- Winning time: 1:47.312

Medalists
gold medal	Serghei Tarnovschi	Moldova
gold medal	Zakhar Petrov	Individual Neutral Athletes
silver medal	Martin Fuksa	Czech Republic
bronze medal	Cătălin Chirilă	Romania

The men's C-1 500 metres competition at the 2024 ICF Canoe Sprint World Championships in Samarkand took place in Rowing and Canoeing Race Course in Samarkand.

== Schedule ==
The schedule is as follows:

Date	Time	Round
Friday 23 August 2024	15:00	Heats
Friday 23 August 2024	16:48	Semifinals
Sunday 25 August 2024	11:42	Final B
Sunday 25 August 2024	12:04	Final A

== Results ==
=== Heats ===
The fastest boat in each heat advanced directly to the final. The next six fastest boats in each heat advanced to the semifinal.

==== Heat 1 ====
Rank	Canoeist	Country	Time	Notes
1	Serghei Tarnovschi	Moldova	1:56.319	QF
2	Zakhar Petrov	Individual Neutral Athletes	1:58.800	QS
3	Vladlen Denisov	Uzbekistan	2:01.002	QS
4	Hwang Seon-hong	South Korea	2:03.691	QS
5	Eduard Strýček	Slovakia	2:04.059	QS
6	Ara Virabyan	Armenia	2:11.053	QS
7	Manuel Fontán	Spain	2:11.436	QS
8	Huang Wei-jung	Chinese Taipei	2:24.975	
	Pasha Askerov	Azerbaijan	DNF	

==== Heat 2 ====
Rank	Canoeist	Country	Time	Notes
1	Martin Fuksa	Czech Republic	1:52.280	QF
2	Conrad-Robin Scheibner	Germany	1:56.676	QS
3	Dániel Fejes	Hungary	1:57.691	QS
4	Wu Shengyue	China	2:01.061	QS
5	Ilya Verashchaka	Individual Neutral Athletes	2:01.196	QS
6	Daniel Pacheco	Colombia	2:03.378	QS
7	Shahriyor Daminov	Tajikistan	2:05.528	QS
8	Ojay Fuentes	Philippines	2:07.857	
9	Dario Maksimovic	Luxembourg	2:21.199	

==== Heat 3 ====
Rank	Canoeist	Country	Time	Notes
1	Cătălin Chirilă	Romania	1:54.412	QF
2	Wiktor Głazunow	Poland	2:00.581	QS
3	Polat Turebekov	Kazakhstan	2:03.739	QS
4	Arjun Singh	India	2:04.871	QS
5	Shuhei Hosumi	Japan	2:04.910	QS
6	Taras Mazovskiy	Ukraine	2:04.945	QS
7	Štefo Lutz	Croatia	2:14.317	QS
8	Ali Aldain	Iraq	2:36.351	

=== Semifinal ===
The fastest three boats in each semi advanced to the A final.
The next four fastest boats in each semi, plus the fastest remaining boat advanced to the final B.

==== Semifinal 1 ====
Rank	Canoeist	Country	Time	Notes
1	Taras Mazovskyi	Ukraine	1:55.409	QA
2	Zakhar Petrov	Individual Neutral Athletes	1:55.429	QA
3	Hwang Seon-hong	South Korea	1:55.534	QA
4	Dániel Fejes	Hungary	1:57.031	QB
5	Polat Turebekov	Kazakhstan	2:00.709	QB
6	Shahriyor Daminov	Tajikistan	2:01.976	QB
7	Ilya Verashchaka	Individual Neutral Athletes	2:04.646	QB
8	Ara Virabyan	Armenia	2:08.124	
9	Arjun Singh	India	2:17.776	

==== Semifinal 2 ====
Rank	Canoeist	Country	Time	Notes
1	Conrad-Robin Scheibner	Germany	1:52.759	QA
2	Wiktor Głazunow	Poland	1:53.279	QA
3	Manuel Fontán	Spain	1:53.539	QA
4	Vladlen Denisov	Uzbekistan	1:54.156	QB
5	Eduard Strýček	Slovakia	1:57.528	QB
6	Wu Shengyue	China	1:57.752	QB
7	Shuhei Hosumi	Japan	1:59.709	QB
8	Daniel Pacheco	Colombia	2:01.354	QB
9	Štefo Lutz	Croatia	2:01.650	

=== Finals ===
==== Final B ====
Competitors in this final raced for positions 10 to 18.

Rank	Canoeist	Country	Time
1	Vladlen Denisov	Uzbekistan	1:50.022
2	Ilya Verashchaka	Individual Neutral Athletes	1:53.414
3	Daniel Pacheco	Colombia	1:55.404
4	Wu Shengyue	China	1:55.832
5	Shuhei Hosumi	Japan	1:57.048
6	Shahriyor Daminov	Tajikistan	1:57.426
7	Dániel Fejes	Hungary	1:57.531
8	Polat Turebekov	Kazakhstan	2:01.116
9	Eduard Strýček	Slovakia	2:09.912

==== Final A ====
Competitors raced for positions 1 to 9, with medals going to the top three.

Rank	Canoeist	Country	Time
1st place, gold medalist(s)	Serghei Tarnovschi	Moldova	1:47.312
1st place, gold medalist(s)	Zakhar Petrov	Individual Neutral Athletes	1:47.312
2nd place, silver medalist(s)	Martin Fuksa	Czech Republic	1:48.405
3rd place, bronze medalist(s)	Cătălin Chirilă	Romania	1:48.456
5	Manuel Fontán	Spain	1:49.850
6	Wiktor Głazunow	Poland	1:50.629
7	Hwang Seon-hong	South Korea	1:54.255
8	Taras Mazovskyi	Ukraine	1:54.766
	Conrad-Robin Scheibner	Germany	DNS
