= Canoe sprint at the 2023 European Games – Men's C-1 500 metres =

Men's C-1 500 metres at the 2023 European Games
- Venue: Kryspinów Waterway
- Date: 23–24 June
- Competitors: 18 from 18 nations
- Winning time: 1:45.462

Medalists
gold medal	Martin Fuksa	Czech Republic
silver medal	Cătălin Chirilă	Romania
bronze medal	Serghei Tarnovschi	Moldova

The men's C-1 500 metres canoe sprint competition at the 2023 European Games took place on 23 and 24 June at the Kryspinów Waterway.

== Schedule ==
All times are local (UTC+2).

Date	Time	Round
Friday, 23 June 2023	10:19	Heats
Friday, 23 June 2023	16:37	Semifinal
Saturday, 24 June 2023	12:57	Final

== Results ==
=== Heats ===
==== Heat 1 ====
Rank	Canoeist	Country	Time	Notes
1	Martin Fuksa	Czech Republic	1:48.470	QF, GB
2	Wiktor Głazunow	Poland	1:48.784	QF
3	Angel Kodinov	Bulgaria	1:50.571	QF
4	Nicolae Craciun	Italy	1:51.977	QS
5	Adrien Bart	France	1:53.224	QS
6	Henrikas Žustautas	Lithuania	1:55.204	QS
7	Joosep Karlson	Estonia	1:56.458	QS
8	Manfred Pallinger	Austria	1:56.671	qS
9	Milan Dörner	Slovakia	3:20.828	

==== Heat 2 ====
Rank	Canoeist	Country	Time	Notes
1	Cătălin Chirilă	Romania	1:49.007	QF
2	Serghei Tarnovschi	Moldova	1:49.050	QF
3	Adrián Sieiro	Spain	1:51.210	QF
4	Taras Mazovskyi	Ukraine	1:51.430	QS
5	Balázs Adolf	Hungary	1:51.564	QS
6	Stefanos Dimopoulos	Greece	1:52.227	QS
7	Marco Apura	Portugal	1:58.054	QS
8	Staņislavs Leščinskis	Latvia	1:59.148	
9	Resül Aydın	Turkey	2:00.081	

=== Semifinal ===
Rank	Canoeist	Country	Time	Notes
1	Adrien Bart	France	1:50.207	QF
2	Balázs Adolf	Hungary	1:50.447	QF
3	Nicolae Craciun	Italy	1:50.539	QF
4	Stefanos Dimopoulos	Greece	1:51.359	
5	Henrikas Žustautas	Lithuania	1:52.649	
6	Taras Mazovskyi	Ukraine	1:53.313	
7	Manfred Pallinger	Austria	1:53.985	
8	Marco Apura	Portugal	1:54.433	
9	Joosep Karlson	Estonia	1:55.869	

=== Final ===
Rank	Canoeist	Country	Time
1st place, gold medalist(s)	Martin Fuksa	Czech Republic	1:45.462 GB
2nd place, silver medalist(s)	Cătălin Chirilă	Romania	1:46.340
3rd place, bronze medalist(s)	Serghei Tarnovschi	Moldova	1:46.460
4	Wiktor Głazunow	Poland	1:46.676
5	Angel Kodinov	Bulgaria	1:46.952
6	Adrián Sieiro	Spain	1:47.344
7	Balázs Adolf	Hungary	1:48.264
8	Nicolae Craciun	Italy	1:48.800
9	Adrien Bart	France	1:49.064
