= 2026 ICF Canoe Sprint World Championships – Men's C-1 500 metres =

Men's C-1 500 metres at the 2026 ICF Canoe Sprint World Championships
- Location: Poznań, Poland
- Dates: 26–29 August
- Winning time: 1:46.08

Medalists
gold medal	Isaquias Guimaraes Queiroz	Brazil
silver medal	Martin Fuksa	Czech Republic
bronze medal	Ji Bowen	China

The men's C-1 500 metres competition at the 2026 ICF Canoe Sprint World Championships in Poznań is taking place between 26 and 29 August 2026.

== Schedule ==
The schedule is as follows:

Date	Time	Round
Wednesday 26 August 2026	09:00	Heats
Friday 28 August 2026	13:30	Semifinals
Saturday 29 August 2026	14:25	Final B
Saturday 29 August 2026	15:04	Final A

== Results ==
=== Heats ===
Five heats were held on morning of 26 August 2026.

Qualification rule : First five in each heat (SF) plus two next fastest (qBT) qualify for semi-finals; remainder are eliminated. (1-5 -> SF; next 2 ->SF; remainder->el.

Heat 1

Rank	Lane	Name(s)	Nation	Time	Behind	Notes
1	4	Ji Bowen	China	1:58.97		SF
2	5	Dániel Fejes	Hungary	1:59.58	+0.61	SF
3	6	Vladlen Denisov	Uzbekistan	2:03.11	+4.14	SF
4	3	Ryo Naganuma	Japan	2:04.24	+5.27	SF
5	8	Resul Aydin	Turkey	2:06.21	+7.24	SF
6	1	Staņislavs Leščinskis	Latvia	2:08.85	+9.88	qBT
7	2	Admilson Andre Batista De Sousa	São Tomé and Príncipe	2:19.84	+20.87	
0	7	Sofiyanto Sofiyanto	Indonesia	DNS		

Heat 2

Rank	Lane	Name(s)	Nation	Time	Behind	Notes
1	5	Isaquias Queiroz	Brazil	1:58.67		SF
2	6	Florin Bange	Germany	1:59.07	+0.4	SF
3	4	Diego Domínguez	Spain	1:59.38	+0.71	SF
4	3	Alix Plomteux	Canada	2:00.25	+1.58	SF
5	7	Ali Dherar Kadhim Aldain	Iraq	2:15.21	+16.54	SF
6	2	Mohamed Ali Hmida	Tunisia	2:27.40	+28.73	
7	8	Julius Omojola Almede	Nigeria	2:31.81	+33.14	
0	1	Bobojon Bobojonov	Tajikistan	DNS		

Heat 3

Rank	Lane	Name(s)	Nation	Time	Behind	Notes
1	5	Martin Fuksa	Czech Republic	2:03.54		SF
2	6	Aleksander Kitewski	Poland	2:06.08	+2.54	SF
3	7	Tsung Chen	Chinese Taipei	2:09.81	+6.27	SF
4	4	Yurii Vandiuk	Ukraine	2:09.91	+6.37	SF
5	3	Ryan Grady	United States	2:11.55	+8.01	SF
6	8	Dario Maksimovic	Luxembourg	2:34.89	+31.35	
7	2	Ibrahima Seck	Senegal	2:41.50	+37.96	

Heat 4

Rank	Lane	Name(s)	Nation	Time	Behind	Notes
1	6	Alexey Korovashkov	Neutral Athlete A	1:56.95		SF
2	5	Serghei Tarnovschi	Moldova	1:58.69	+1.74	SF
3	4	Nicolae Craciun	Italy	2:00.03	+3.08	SF
4	8	Braulio Nicolae Flores-Mateescu	Romania	2:05.59	+8.64	SF
5	2	Cristián Ávila	Colombia	2:09.48	+12.53	SF
6	3	Mohamed Gouda	Egypt	2:10.96	+14.01	qBT
7	7	William Reyser Figueroa Del Aguila	Peru	2:27.14	+30.19	

Heat 5

Rank	Lane	Name(s)	Nation	Time	Behind	Notes
1	5	Stefanos Dimopoulos	Greece	1:58.20		SF
2	6	Aramis Caleb Sánchez Ayala	Argentina	1:59.44	+1.24	SF
3	3	Preslav Georgiev	Bulgaria	2:01.73	+3.53	SF
4	4	Thomas Lambert	Great Britain	2:04.31	+6.11	SF
5	7	Sunil Singh Salam	India	2:13.85	+15.65	SF
6	8	Joaquim Lobo	Mozambique	2:20.95	+22.75	
7	2	Mohamed Ali Merzougui	Algeria	2:22.06	+23.86	

=== Semi finals ===
The first three in each semi final qualify for the A final; the next thee in each semi final for the B final; the remainder the C final.

Semi final 1

Rank	Lane	Name(s)	Nation	Time	Behind	Notes
1	5	Ji Bowen	China	1:56.18		FA
2	6	Florin Bange	Germany	1:56.51	+0.33	FA
3	3	Aramis Caleb Sánchez Ayala	Argentina	1:57.23	+1.05	FA
4	4	Alexey Korovashkov	Neutral Athlete A	1:58.98	+2.8	FB
5	8	Braulio Nicolae Flores-Mateescu	Romania	2:01.87	+5.69	FB
6	2	Ryo Naganuma	Japan	2:02.55	+6.37	FB
7	1	Ali Dherar Kadhim Aldain	Iraq	2:10.04	+13.86	FC
8	9	Sunil Singh Salam	India	2:10.56	+14.38	FC
9	7	Tsung Chen	Chinese Taipei	2:15.10	+18.92	FC

Semi final 2

Rank	Lane	Name(s)	Nation	Time	Behind	Notes
1	6	Serghei Tarnovschi	Moldova	1:59.51		FA
2	5	Martin Fuksa	Czech Republic	2:00.98	+1.47	FA
3	4	Dániel Fejes	Hungary	2:02.46	+2.95	FA
4	7	Preslav Georgiev	Bulgaria	2:06.42	+6.91	FB
5	3	Diego Domínguez	Spain	2:06.66	+7.15	FB
6	8	Resul Aydin	Turkey	2:07.90	+8.39	FB
7	2	Yurii Vandiuk	Ukraine	2:08.42	+8.91	FC
8	9	Staņislavs Leščinskis	Latvia	2:16.34	+16.83	FC
9	1	Cristián Ávila	Colombia	2:34.00	+34.49	FC

Semi final 3

Rank	Lane	Name(s)	Nation	Time	Behind	Notes
1	5	Isaquias Queiroz	Brazil	2:01.98		FA
2	4	Stefanos Dimopoulos	Greece	2:02.41	+0.43	FA
3	2	Alix Plomteux	Canada	2:02.80	+0.82	FA
4	7	Nicolae Craciun	Italy	2:02.83	+0.85	FB
5	3	Vladlen Denisov	Uzbekistan	2:04.41	+2.43	FB
6	8	Thomas Lambert	Great Britain	2:04.62	+2.64	FB
7	6	Aleksander Kitewski	Poland	2:07.72	+5.74	FC
8	1	Ryan Grady	United States	2:11.92	+9.94	FC
-	9	Mohamed Gouda	Egypt	DNS		

=== Finals ===
The finals were held on the afternoon of 29 August.

==== Final C ====
Rank	Canoeist	Country	Time	Notes
1	Yurii Vandiuk	Ukraine	1:52.29	
2	Ali Dherar Kadhim Aldain	Iraq	1:53.68	
3	Ryan Grady	United States	1:54.73	
4	Sunil Singh Salam	India	1:54.85	
5	Staņislavs Leščinskis	Latvia	1:55.95	
6	Tsung Chen	Chinese Taipei	1:56.82	
7	Cristián Ávila	Colombia	1:58.57	
8	Aleksander Kitewski	Poland	2:10.08	

==== Final B ====
Rank	Canoeist	Country	Time	Notes
1	Vladlen Denisov	Uzbekistan	1:48.09	
2	Diego Domínguez	Spain	1:48.85	
3	Nicolae Craciun	Italy	1:50.08	
4	Alexey Korovashkov	Neutral Athlete A	1:50.97	
5	Ryo Naganuma	Japan	1:51.68	
6	Resul Aydin	Turkey	1:52.56	
7	Thomas Lambert	United Kingdom	1:53.05	
8	Braulio Nicolae Flores-Mateescu	Romania	1:55.34	
9	Preslav Georgiev	Bulgaria	2:03.92	

==== Final A ====
Rank	Canoeist	Country	Time	Notes
1st place, gold medalist(s)	Isaquias Queiroz	Brazil	1:46.08	
2nd place, silver medalist(s)	Martin Fuksa	Czech Republic	1:46.32	
3rd place, bronze medalist(s)	Ji Bowen	China	1:47.10	
4	Florin Bange	Germany	1:48.25	
4	Stefanos Dimopoulos	Greece	1:48.25	
6	Alix Plomteux	Canada	1:48.70	
7	Serghei Tarnovschi	Moldova	1:48.76	
8	Dániel Fejes	Hungary	1:48.88	
9	Aramis Caleb Sánchez Ayala	Argentina	1:50.33	
