= Canoeing at the 2023 Pan American Games – Men's C-1 1000 metres =

Men's C-1 1000 metres at the 2023 Pan American Games
- Venue: Laguna Grande
- Dates: November 2 and November 4
- Competitors: 12 from 11 nations
- Winning time: 3:48.69

Medalists
Gold medal	José Ramón Pelier	Cuba
Silver medal	Isaquias Queiroz	Brazil
Bronze medal	Connor Fitzpatrick	Canada

The men's C-1 1000 metres competition of the canoeing events at the 2023 Pan American Games was held on November 2 and 4 at the Laguna Grande in San Pedro de la Paz, Chile.

== Schedule ==
Date	Time	Round
November 2, 2023	09:20	Heats
November 2, 2023	11:30	Semi-final
November 4, 2023	09:25	Final

== Results ==
=== Heats ===
The best two score of each heat advance directly to the final, while the rest advance to the semifinal.

==== Heat 1 ====
Rank	Name	Nation	Time	Notes
1	Isaquias Queiroz	Brazil	3:55.32	FA
2	José Ramón Pelier	Cuba	3:55.44	FA
3	Michael Martínez	Chile	4:13.68	SF
4	Rigoberto Camilo	Mexico	4:24.56	SF
5	Sergio Díaz	Colombia	4:26.03	SF
6	Edwar Paredes	Venezuela	4:53.99	SF

==== Heat 2 ====
Rank	Name	Nation	Time	Notes
1	Connor Fitzpatrick	Canada	4:06.66	FA
2	Jonathan Grady	United States	4:09.12	FA
3	Elvis Reyes	Cuba	4:10.33	SF
4	Joaquín Lukac	Argentina	4:36.52	SF
5	Antonely Viloria	Dominican Republic	4:39.78	SF
6	Colin Portocarrero	Peru	4:51.97	SF

=== Semifinals ===
The best four scores advance to the Final A, while the rest advance to the Final B.

Rank	Name	Nation	Time	Notes
1	Sergio Díaz	Colombia	4:03.80	FA
2	Michael Martínez	Chile	4:04.00	FA
3	Edwar Paredes	Venezuela	4:06.88	FA
4	Rigoberto Camilo	Mexico	4:07.38	FA
5	Elvis Reyes	Cuba	4:15.10	FB
6	Antonely Viloria	Dominican Republic	4:33.32	FB
7	Joaquín Lukac	Argentina	4:34.52	FB
8	Colin Portocarrero	Peru	5:06.44	FB

=== Finals ===
The results for the finals were as follows:

==== Final B ====
Rank	Name	Nation	Time	Notes
9	Elvis Reyes	Cuba	4:14.04	
10	Antonely Viloria	Dominican Republic	4:29.87	
11	Colin Portocarrero	Peru	4:45.60	
12	Joaquín Lukac	Argentina	5:01.91	

==== Final A ====
Rank	Name	Nation	Time	Notes
1st place, gold medalist(s)	José Ramón Pelier	Cuba	3:48.69	
2nd place, silver medalist(s)	Isaquias Queiroz	Brazil	3:54.05	
3rd place, bronze medalist(s)	Connor Fitzpatrick	Canada	3:55.13	
4	Michael Martínez	Chile	3:59.43	
5	Rigoberto Camilo	Mexico	4:00.10	
6	Sergio Díaz	Colombia	4:00.12	
7	Edwar Paredes	Venezuela	4:03.54	
8	Jonathan Grady	United States	4:16.64	
