= Canoeing at the 2023 Pan American Games – Men's C-2 500 metres =

Men's C-2 500 metres at the 2023 Pan American Games
- Venue: Laguna Grande
- Dates: November 3
- Competitors: 14 from 7 nations
- Winning time: 1:42.12

Medalists
Gold medal	Craig Spence; Alix Plomteaux	Canada
Silver medal	Filipe Vieira; Evandilson Neto	Brazil
Bronze medal	José Ramón Pelier; Javier Requeiro	Cuba

The men's C-2 500 metres competition of the canoeing events at the 2023 Pan American Games was held on November 3 at the Laguna Grande in San Pedro de la Paz, Chile.

The men's C-2 event was changed from 1000 metres, as it was contested during the previous games, to 500 metres.

== Schedule ==
Date	Time	Round
November 3, 2023	09:30	Final

== Results ==
The results were as follows:

Rank	Name	Nation	Time
1st place, gold medalist(s)	Craig Spence; Alix Plomteaux	Canada	1:42.12
2nd place, silver medalist(s)	Filipe Vieira; Evandilson Neto	Brazil	1:43.52
3rd place, bronze medalist(s)	José Ramón Pelier; Javier Requeiro	Cuba	1:43.66
4	Alejandro Rodríguez; Daniel Pacheco	Colombia	1:44.93
5	Rigoberto Camilo; Gustavo Eslava	Mexico	1:45.00
6	Jonathan Grady; Ian Ross	United States	1:49.39
7	Benjamín Cardozo; Joaquín Lukac	Argentina	1:53.48
