= Sergei Yemelyanov =

Russian footballer and coach

Personal information
- Full name: Sergei Arkadyevich Yemelyanov
- Date of birth: 24 June 1981 (age 45)
- Place of birth: Izhevsk, Russian SFSR
- Height: 1.80 m (5 ft 11 in)
- Positions: Defender; midfielder

Team information
- Current team: FC KAMAZ Naberezhnye Chelny (assistant coach)

Senior career*
Years	Team	Apps	(Gls)
1999–2000	FC Dynamo Izhevsk	38	(2)
2000–2006	FC KAMAZ Naberezhnye Chelny	193	(33)
2007–2008	FC Nosta Novotroitsk	39	(2)
2009	FC Krasnodar	11	(0)
2009	FC Metallurg Lipetsk	9	(1)
2010	FC SOYUZ-Gazprom Izhevsk	26	(5)
2011–2013	FC Metallurg-Kuzbass Novokuznetsk	51	(1)
2013–2014	FC Zenit-Izhevsk	14	(0)

Managerial career
- 2015–2018: FC Zenit-Izhevsk-2 (assistant)
- 2018: FC Zenit-Izhevsk (assistant)
- 2018–2020: FC Zenit-Izhevsk
- 2021–2022: FC Zvezda Perm (assistant)
- 2022–2024: FC Irtysh Omsk (assistant)
- 2024–2026: FC Torpedo Miass (assistant)
- 2026–: FC KAMAZ Naberezhnye Chelny (assistant)
- * Club domestic league appearances and goals

Sergei Arkadyevich Yemelyanov (Russian: Сергей Аркадьевич Емельянов; born 24 June 1981) is a Russian professional football coach and a former player. He is an assistant coach with FC KAMAZ Naberezhnye Chelny.

== Club career ==
He made his Russian Football National League debut for FC KAMAZ Naberezhnye Chelny on 31 March 2004 in a game against FC Neftekhimik Nizhnekamsk.
