= Ghailene Khattali =

Tunisian canoeist (born 2000)

Personal information
- Born: 17 June 2000 (age 26)

Sport
- Country: Tunisia
- Sport: Canoeing
Medal record
Men's canoe sprint
Representing Tunisia
African Games
Gold medal – first place	2019 Rabat	C-1 200 m
Gold medal – first place	2019 Rabat	C-1 1000 m
Bronze medal – third place	2019 Rabat	C-2 200 m
Bronze medal – third place	2019 Rabat	C-2 1000 m

Ghailene Khattali (Arabic: غيلان الختالي, born 17 June 2000) is a Tunisian sprint canoeist. He competed at the 2019 African Games and he won the gold medals in the C-1 200 metres and C-1 1000 metres events. He also won the bronze medals in the C-2 200 metres and C-2 1000 metres events, alongside Mohamed Kendaoui.

In that same year, he also competed in the men's C-1 200 metres, men's C-1 500 metres and men's C-1 1000 metres events at the 2019 ICF Canoe Sprint World Championships held in Szeged, Hungary. A year earlier, he competed in several events at the 2018 ICF Canoe Sprint World Championships held in Montemor-o-Velho, Portugal.

He competed in the men's C-1 1000 metres event at the 2020 Summer Olympics held in Tokyo, Japan. He also competed in the men's C-1 1000 metres event at the 2024 Summer Olympics held in Paris, France.
