= Oleksandr Maksymchuk =

Ukrainian canoeist

Medal record

Men's canoe sprint

Representing Ukraine

World Championships
Silver medal – second place	2010 Poznań	C-1 4x200 m
Silver medal – second place	2014 Moscow	C-1 4x200 m
Bronze medal – third place	2011 Szeged	C-1 500 m

Oleksandr Maksymchuk (born 1983) is a Ukrainian sprint canoer who has competed since the late 2000s. He won a silver medal in the C-1 4 × 200 m relay at the 2010 ICF Canoe Sprint World Championships in Poznań.
