= Isaquias Queiroz =

Brazilian canoeist (born 1994)

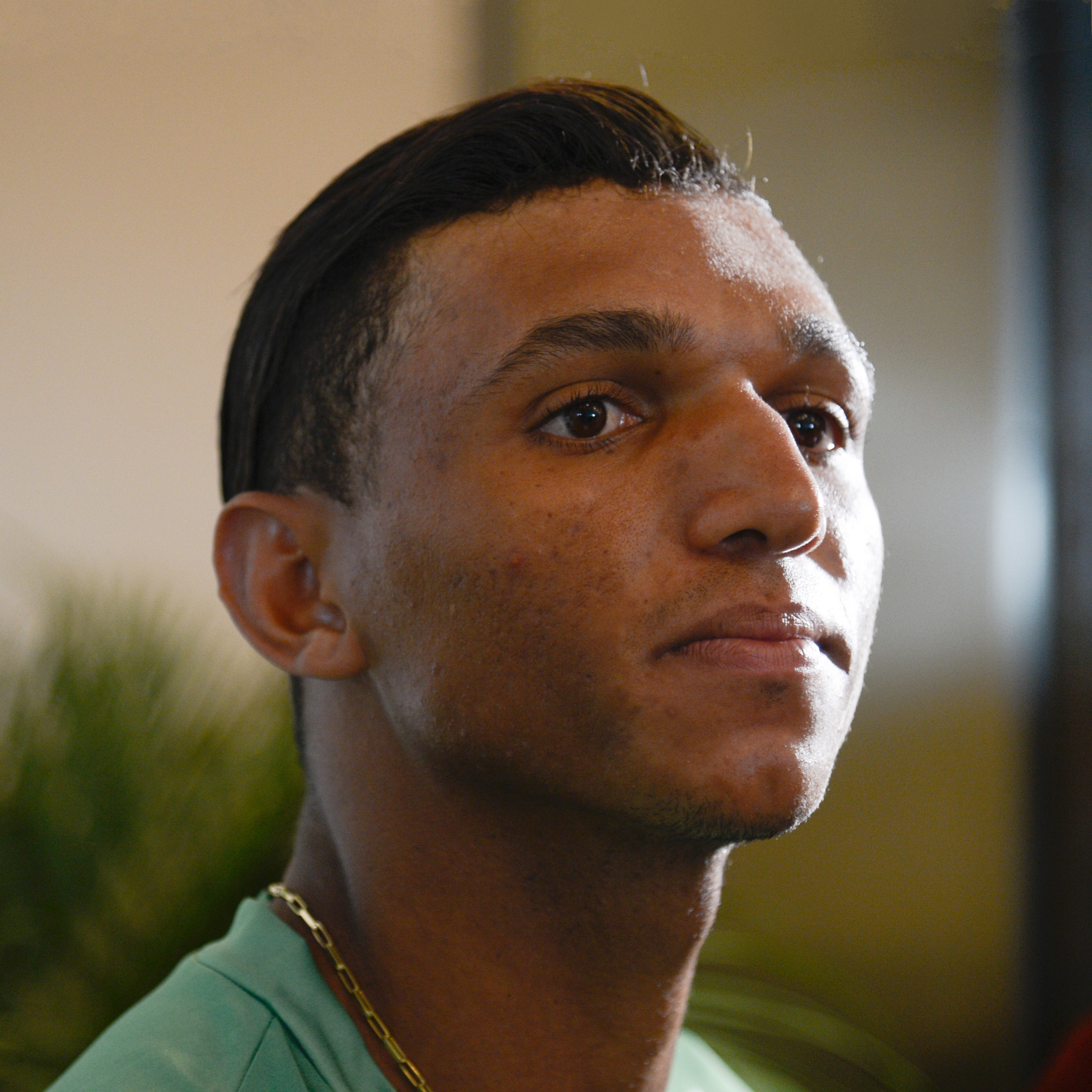
- Queiroz in 2016

Personal information
- Full name: Isaquias Queiroz dos Santos
- Born: 3 January 1994 (age 32) Ubaitaba, Brazil
- Height: 1.75 m (5 ft 9 in)
- Weight: 85 kg (187 lb)

Sport
- Country: Brazil
- Sport: Sprint canoe
- Events: C–1 200 m, C–1 500 m, C–1 1000 m, C–2 500 m, C-2 1000 m
- Club: Flamengo
- Coached by: Jesús Morlán (until 2018); Lauro de Souza Júnior (2019 onward)
Medal record
Event	1st	2nd	3rd
Olympic Games	1	3	1
World Championships	8	1	6
Pan American Games	3	2	0
Total	12	6	7
Men's canoe sprint
Representing Brazil
Olympic Games
Gold medal – first place	2020 Tokyo	C–1 1000 m
Silver medal – second place	2016 Rio de Janeiro	C–1 1000 m
Silver medal – second place	2016 Rio de Janeiro	C–2 1000 m
Silver medal – second place	2024 Paris	C–1 1000 m
Bronze medal – third place	2016 Rio de Janeiro	C–1 200 m
World Championships
Gold medal – first place	2013 Duisburg	C–1 500 m
Gold medal – first place	2014 Moscow	C–1 500 m
Gold medal – first place	2015 Milan	C–2 1000 m
Gold medal – first place	2018 Montemor-o-Velho	C–1 500 m
Gold medal – first place	2018 Montemor-o-Velho	C–2 500 m
Gold medal – first place	2019 Szeged	C–1 1000 m
Gold medal – first place	2022 Dartmouth	C–1 500 m
Gold medal – first place	2026 Poznań	C-1 500 m
Silver medal – second place	2022 Dartmouth	C–1 1000 m
Bronze medal – third place	2013 Duisburg	C–1 1000 m
Bronze medal – third place	2014 Moscow	C–2 200 m
Bronze medal – third place	2015 Milan	C–1 200 m
Bronze medal – third place	2017 Račice	C–1 1000 m
Bronze medal – third place	2018 Montemor-o-Velho	C–1 1000 m
Bronze medal – third place	2019 Szeged	C–2 1000 m
Pan American Games
Gold medal – first place	2015 Toronto	C–1 200 m
Gold medal – first place	2015 Toronto	C–1 1000 m
Gold medal – first place	2019 Lima	C–1 1000 m
Silver medal – second place	2015 Toronto	C–2 1000 m
Silver medal – second place	2023 Santiago	C–1 1000 m

Isaquias Queiroz dos Santos (born 3 January 1994), also known as Isaquias Guimarães Queiroz, is a Brazilian sprint canoeist who has competed since 2005. He is the first Brazilian athlete to ever win three medals in a single edition of the Olympic Games, and the second most decorated Brazilian athlete with five medals overall, including a gold medal.

== Early life ==
He's been through adversity in his younger years. As a toddler, he poured boiling water on himself and spent a month in the hospital recovering. At the age of 5, he was kidnapped and offered up for adoption before being rescued by his mother, and five years later, he fell out of a tree while trying to catch a snake and lost a kidney.

== Career ==
Queiroz is the first Brazilian sprint canoeist to win a medal at ICF Canoe Sprint World Championships. His first medal was a bronze medal at the 2013 ICF Canoe Sprint World Championships in C–1 1000 event, and his first gold medal was in the C-1 500 event in the same year. Up to the 2022 ICF Canoe Sprint World Championships, Queiroz has already conquered 14 medals in World Championships, seven gold medals.

=== 2016 Olympic Games ===
During the 2016 Summer Olympics, Queiroz won three Olympic medals at a single Games: two silver and one bronze. In the C–1 1000 metres event, he finished second, defeated only by Sebastian Brendel, who successfully defended his title. In the process, he became the first Brazilian sprint canoeist to win an Olympic medal. Two days later, he took the bronze medal in the C–1 200 metres event when Yuriy Cheban and Valentin Demyanenko were faster than him. Together with Erlon Silva, they won the silver medal during the last day of canoe sprint competitions in the C–2 1000 metres category. Queiroz was the first Brazilian athlete in history to win three medals at a single edition of the Olympic Games and the first sprint canoe athlete from any nationality to do so in the history of the Olympics.

=== 2020 Olympic Games ===
The 2020 Summer Olympics had Queiroz partnered with Jacky Godmann as Erlon Silva had not recovered from a hip injury. In the C–2 1000 metres category, Queiroz and Godmann finished in fourth place. Queiroz won the gold in his remaining race, the C-1 1000 meters. He considered a consolidation of extensive training to get a victory that eluded him in Rio and became the first Brazilian Olympic champion in canoeing.

=== 2024 Olympic Games ===
Queiroz was one of eight sprint canoeists named to represent Brazil at the 2024 Summer Olympics. On 22 July 2024, the Brazil Olympic Committee designated Queiroz and rugby player Raquel Kochhann to be the Brazilian flag bearers at the 2024 Summer Olympics Parade of Nations. During the Olympics, Queiroz and Goodman again reached the C–2 1000 metres final, finishing eighth. In the C-1 1000 meters Queiroz finished with a silver, marking his fifth Olympic medal and tying him with Robert Scheidt and Torben Grael as the most condecorated Brazilian man in the Games.

Olympic Games
Preceded by Edson Bindilatti; Jaqueline Mourão	Flagbearer for Brazil; París 2024; With: Raquel Kochhann	Succeeded by Incumbent
