= Takanori Tōme =

Japanese canoeist

Personal information
- Nationality: Japanese
- Born: 21 December 1992 (age 33)

Sport
- Sport: Canoe sprint
- Club: Sanjo Sports Association
- Coached by: Pedro Sena; Alexandr Nikonorov

Takanori Tōme (當銘 孝仁, Tōme Takanori, born 21 December 1992) is a Japanese canoeist. He competed in the men's C-1 1000 metres event at the 2020 Summer Olympics.

== Career ==
In August 2018, Tōme represented Japan at the 2018 Asian Games in the men's C-2 1000 metres event. He also represented Japan at the 2017 and 2019 ICF Canoe Sprint World Championships.

Tome represented Japan at the 2020 Summer Olympics in the men's C-2 1000 metres event.
