= Martin Fuksa =

Czech canoeist

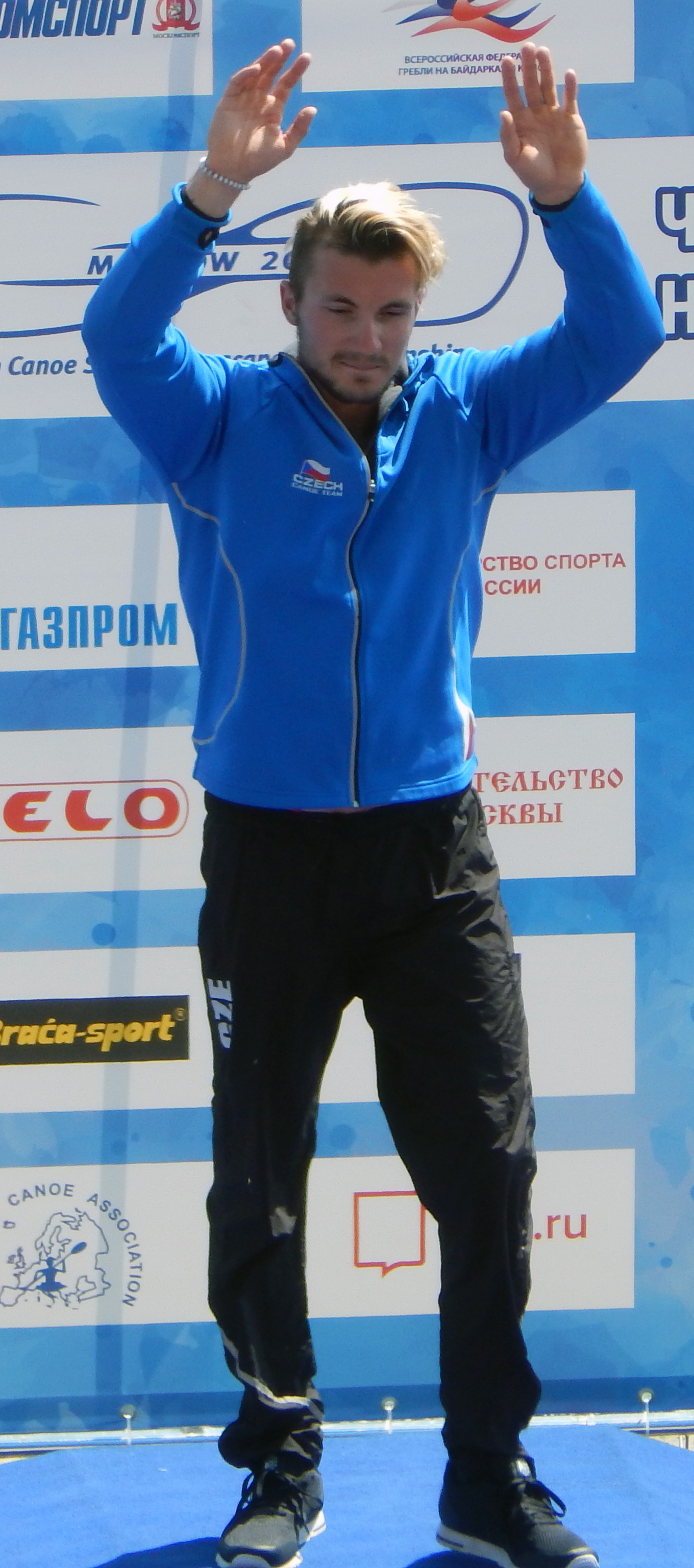
- Fuksa in 2016

Personal information
- Born: 30 April 1993 (age 33) Nymburk, Czech Republic
- Height: 1.80 m (5 ft 11 in)
- Weight: 82 kg (181 lb)

Sport
- Country: Czech Republic
- Sport: Canoe sprint
- Events: C-1 500 m, C-1 1000 m
- Club: ASC Dukla
Medal record
Men's canoe sprint
Representing Czech Republic
Olympic Games
Gold medal – first place	2024 Paris	C-1 1000 m
World Championships
Gold medal – first place	2015 Milan	C-1 500 m
Gold medal – first place	2017 Račice	C-1 500 m
Gold medal – first place	2023 Duisburg	C-1 1000 m
Gold medal – first place	2025 Milan	C-1 1000 m
Gold medal – first place	2026 Poznań	C-1 1000 m
Silver medal – second place	2014 Moscow	C-1 1000 m
Silver medal – second place	2015 Milan	C-1 1000 m
Silver medal – second place	2017 Račice	C-1 1000 m
Silver medal – second place	2018 Montemor-o-Velho	C-1 1000 m
Silver medal – second place	2021 Copenhagen	C-1 500 m
Silver medal – second place	2021 Copenhagen	C-1 1000 m
Silver medal – second place	2024 Samarkand	C-1 500 m
Silver medal – second place	2025 Milan	C-1 500 m
Silver medal – second place	2026 Poznań	C-1 500 m
Bronze medal – third place	2014 Moscow	C-1 500 m
Bronze medal – third place	2018 Montemor-o-Velho	C-1 500 m
Bronze medal – third place	2022 Dartmouth	C-1 500 m
Bronze medal – third place	2022 Dartmouth	C-1 1000 m
European Championships
Gold medal – first place	2013 Montemor-o-Velho	C-1 1000 m
Gold medal – first place	2013 Montemor-o-Velho	C-1 500 m
Gold medal – first place	2014 Brandenburg	C-1 500 m
Gold medal – first place	2015 Racice	C-1 500 m
Gold medal – first place	2016 Moscow	C-1 500 m
Gold medal – first place	2017 Plovdiv	C-1 500 m
Gold medal – first place	2018 Belgrade	C-1 500 m
Gold medal – first place	2018 Belgrade	C-1 1000 m
Gold medal – first place	2021 Poznań	C-1 500 m
Gold medal – first place	2021 Poznań	C-1 1000 m
Gold medal – first place	2022 Munich	C-1 500 m
Gold medal – first place	2023 Kraków	C-1 500 m
Gold medal – first place	2025 Racice	C-1 500 m
Gold medal – first place	2026 Montemor-o-Velho	C-1 500 m
Gold medal – first place	2026 Montemor-o-Velho	C-1 1000 m
Silver medal – second place	2012 Zagreb	C-1 500 m
Silver medal – second place	2017 Plovdiv	C-1 1000 m
Silver medal – second place	2022 Munich	C-1 1000 m
Silver medal – second place	2024 Szeged	C-1 1000 m
Silver medal – second place	2025 Racice	C-1 1000 m
Bronze medal – third place	2016 Moscow	C-1 1000 m
Bronze medal – third place	2024 Szeged	C-1 500 m
European Games
Gold medal – first place	2023 Kraków-Małopolska	C-1 500 m
Silver medal – second place	2015 Baku	C-1 1000 m
Bronze medal – third place	2015 Baku	C-1 200 m

Martin Fuksa (Czech pronunciation: [ˈmarcɪn ˈfuksa]; born 30 April 1993) is a Czech sprint canoeist. Five-times world champion (in C-1 500 and C-1 1000 metres), Fuksa won the gold medal at the 2024 Summer Olympics in the C-1 1000 metres event.

== Career ==
Fuksa and his brother Petr represented the Czech Republic together in the men's C-2 1000 metres event at the 2020 Summer Olympics.

== Personal life ==
Fuksa is the son of former canoeist Petr Fuksa, and the brother of Petr Fuksa Jr.

== Major results ==
=== Olympic Games ===
Year	C-1 200	C-1 1000	C-2 500	C-2 1000
2016	9	5	—N/a	
2020	—N/a	5	—N/a	2 FB
2024	—N/a	1st place, gold medalist(s)	7	—N/a

=== World championships ===
Year	C-1 200	C-1 500	C-1 1000	C-2 500	C-2 1000
2011	3 FB	6			
2014		3rd place, bronze medalist(s)	2nd place, silver medalist(s)		
2015		1st place, gold medalist(s)	2nd place, silver medalist(s)		
2017		1st place, gold medalist(s)	2nd place, silver medalist(s)		
2018		3rd place, bronze medalist(s)	2nd place, silver medalist(s)	5 SF	
2019			5		9
2021	—N/a	2nd place, silver medalist(s)	2nd place, silver medalist(s)		
2022	—N/a	3rd place, bronze medalist(s)	3rd place, bronze medalist(s)		
2023			1st place, gold medalist(s)	8	
2024		2nd place, silver medalist(s)	—N/a	—N/a	

=== European championships ===
Year	C-1 200	C-1 500	C-1 1000	C-2 500	C-2 1000
2012	1 FB	2nd place, silver medalist(s)	4		
2013	6	1st place, gold medalist(s)	1st place, gold medalist(s)		
2014		1st place, gold medalist(s)	8		
2015	4	1st place, gold medalist(s)	4		
2016	5	1st place, gold medalist(s)	3rd place, bronze medalist(s)		
2017	4	1st place, gold medalist(s)	2nd place, silver medalist(s)		
2018	7	1st place, gold medalist(s)	1st place, gold medalist(s)		
2019	5 SF	—N/a	9	—N/a	6
2021		1st place, gold medalist(s)	1st place, gold medalist(s)		
2022		1st place, gold medalist(s)	2nd place, silver medalist(s)		
2023		1st place, gold medalist(s)	—N/a	5	—N/a
2024		3rd place, bronze medalist(s)	2nd place, silver medalist(s)	5	

== Awards and recognition ==
- Medal of Merit (2025)
