= Conrad-Robin Scheibner =

German sprint canoeist

Conrad Scheibner
Personal information
- Full name: Conrad-Robin Scheibner
- Nationality: German
- Born: 7 May 1996 (age 30) Berlin, Germany
- Height: 1.82 m (6 ft 0 in)

Sport
- Country: Germany
- Sport: Canoe sprint
- Club: Sportclub Berlin-Grünau
Medal record
Men's canoe sprint
Representing Germany
World Championships
Gold medal – first place	2017 Račice	C-4 1000 m
Gold medal – first place	2021 Copenhagen	C-1 500 m
Gold medal – first place	2021 Copenhagen	C-1 1000 m
Silver medal – second place	2019 Szeged	C-4 500 m
Silver medal – second place	2023 Duisburg	C-1 500 m
European Championships
Silver medal – second place	2017 Plovdiv	C-4 1000 m
Silver medal – second place	2021 Poznań	C-1 1000 m
Bronze medal – third place	2021 Poznań	C-1 500 m

Conrad-Robin Scheibner (born 7 May 1996) is a German sprint canoeist.

He won a medal at the 2019 ICF Canoe Sprint World Championships and was a double World Champion at the 2021 ICF Canoe Sprint World Championships in the C-1 500 m and C-1 1000 m.

== Major results ==
=== Olympic Games ===
Year	C-1 1000	C-2 1000
2020	6	

=== World championships ===
Year	C-1 500	C-1 1000	C-1 5000	C-2 500	C-4 500	C-4 1000
2017				9	—N/a	1st place, gold medalist(s)
2018					4	—N/a
2019				5	2nd place, silver medalist(s)	—N/a
2021	1st place, gold medalist(s)	1st place, gold medalist(s)				—N/a
2023	2nd place, silver medalist(s)				6	—N/a
2024	DNS FA	—N/a	DNS	—N/a	—N/a	—N/a
