= Cătălin Chirilă =

Romanian canoeist (born 1998)

Personal information
- Nationality: Romanian
- Born: 11 May 1998 (age 28) Tulcea, Romania

Sport
- Sport: Canoe sprint
- Club: CSA Steaua Bucuresti
Medal record
World Championships
Gold medal – first place	2022 Dartmouth	C-1 1000 m
Gold medal – first place	2023 Duisburg	C-1 500 m
Silver medal – second place	2022 Dartmouth	C-1 500 m
Silver medal – second place	2023 Duisburg	C-1 1000 m
Bronze medal – third place	2024 Samarkand	C-1 500 m
European Games
Gold medal – first place	2019 Minsk	C-2 1000 m
Silver medal – second place	2023 Kraków-Małopolska	C-1 500 m
European Championships
Gold medal – first place	2022 Munich	C-1 1000 m
Gold medal – first place	2024 Szeged	C-1 1000 m
Gold medal – first place	2025 Racice	C-1 1000 m
Silver medal – second place	2023 Kraków	C-1 500 m
Bronze medal – third place	2021 Poznań	C-2 1000 m
Bronze medal – third place	2022 Munich	C-1 500 m
Bronze medal – third place	2025 Racice	C-1 500 m

Cătălin Chirilă (born 11 May 1998) is a Romanian canoeist. He competed in the men's C-2 1000 metres event at the 2020 Summer Olympics.

== Major results ==
=== Olympic Games ===
Year	C-1 1000	C-2 500	C-2 1000
2020	3 FB	—N/a	5
2024	1 FB		—N/a

=== World championships ===
Year	C-1 200	C-1 500	C-1 1000	C-1 5000	C-2 1000	C-4 500	C-4 1000
2017				20		—N/a	5
2018			9 SF			5	—N/a
2019					5		—N/a
2022		2nd place, silver medalist(s)	1st place, gold medalist(s)				—N/a
2023		1st place, gold medalist(s)	2nd place, silver medalist(s)				—N/a
2024	8	3rd place, bronze medalist(s)	—N/a			—N/a	—N/a
