= Shahriyor Daminov =

Tajik canoeist (born 1997)

Personal information
- Nationality: Tajikistan
- Born: 1 January 1997 (age 29)
- Height: 176 cm (5 ft 9 in)
- Weight: 78 kg (172 lb)

Sport
- Country: Tajikistan
- Sport: sprint canoeist
Medal record
Men's canoe sprint
Representing Tajikistan
Asian Games
Silver medal – second place	2018 Jakarta-Palembang	C-1 1000 m
Asian Championships
Silver medal – second place	2017 Shanghai	C-1 1000 m
Bronze medal – third place	2025 Nanchang	C-2 1000 m

Shahriyor Daminov (Russian: Шахриёр Даминов; born 1 January 1997) is a Tajikistani sprint canoer.

== Career ==
He was the silver medalist at the 2017 Asian Championships and at the 2018 Asian Games in the men's sprint C-1 1000 metres event. In 2018, he claimed the title at the Asian Championships in the C-1 1000 metres and also won the bronze in the C-4 1000 metres event.

== Major results ==
=== World championships ===
Year	C-1 200	C-1 500	C-1 1000	C-1 5000	C-2 200
2013			9 SF		9 H
2015	8 SF	8 FB	8 SF		
2019		9 SF	7 FC	16	
2024	5 FB	6 FB	—N/a		—N/a
