= Zheng Pengfei =

Chinese canoeist

Personal information
- Nationality: Chinese
- Born: 7 April 1993 (age 33)

Sport
- Sport: Canoe sprint
Medal record
Men's canoe sprint
Representing China
Olympic Games
Silver medal – second place	2020 Tokyo	C-2 1000 m
Asian Championships
Silver medal – second place	2015 Palembang	C-2 1000 m
Silver medal – second place	2017 Shanghai	C-4 1000 m
Bronze medal – third place	2017 Shanghai	C-1 1000 m

Zheng Pengfei (born 7 April 1993) is a Chinese sprint canoeist. He along with Canoe Sprint partner Liu Hao, competed in the men's C-2 1000 metres event at the Tokyo 2020 Summer Olympics and won Silver.
