= Serghei Tarnovschi =

Ukrainian-Moldovan canoeist

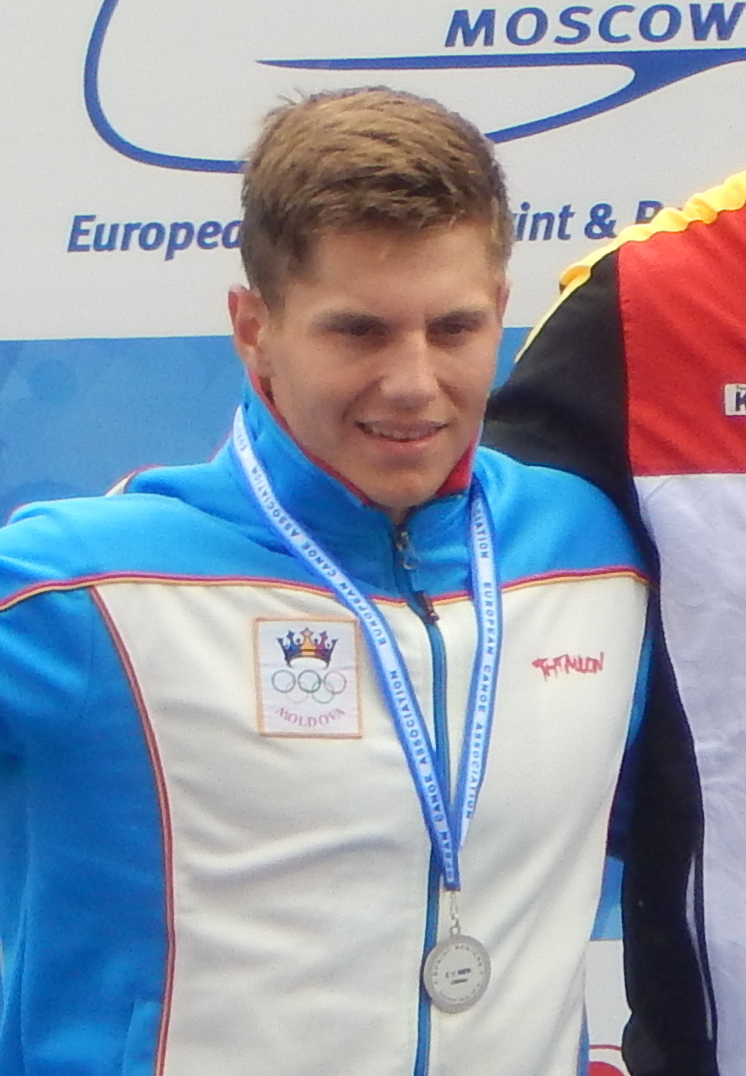
- Tarnovschi in 2016

Personal information
- Nationality: Moldovan
- Born: 24 June 1997 (age 29) Lviv, Ukraine
- Height: 1.78 m (5 ft 10 in)
- Weight: 80 kg (176 lb)

Sport
- Country: Moldova
- Sport: Canoe sprint
Medal record
Representing Moldova
Men's canoe sprint
Olympic Games
Disqualified	2016 Rio de Janeiro	C-1 1000 m
Bronze medal – third place	2020 Tokyo	C-1 1000 m
Bronze medal – third place	2024 Paris	C-1 1000 m
World Championships
Gold medal – first place	2022 Dartmouth	C-1 5000 m
Gold medal – first place	2024 Samarkand	C-1 500 m
Gold medal – first place	2025 Milan	C-1 5000 m
Silver medal – second place	2024 Samarkand	C-1 5000 m
Bronze medal – third place	2015 Milan	C-1 1000 m
Bronze medal – third place	2023 Duisburg	C-1 500 m
Bronze medal – third place	2025 Milan	C-1 500 m
European Championships
Gold medal – first place	2024 Szeged	C-1 500 m
Gold medal – first place	2025 Račice	C-1 5000 m
Gold medal – first place	2026 Montemor-o-Velho	C-1 5000 m
Silver medal – second place	2016 Moscow	C-1 1000 m
Silver medal – second place	2021 Poznań	C-1 500 m
Silver medal – second place	2022 Munich	C-1 500 m
Silver medal – second place	2025 Račice	C-1 500 m
Bronze medal – third place	2024 Szeged	C-1 1000 m
Bronze medal – third place	2024 Szeged	C-1 5000 m
Bronze medal – third place	2025 Račice	C-1 1000 m
Bronze medal – third place	2025 Račice	C-4 Mix 500 m
European Games
Bronze medal – third place	2023 Kraków-Małopolska	C-1 500 m
World University Championships
Gold medal – first place	2022 Bydgoszcz	C-1 1000 m
Gold medal – first place	2022 Bydgoszcz	C-1 500 m
Gold medal – first place	2022 Bydgoszcz	C-1 200 m
Youth Olympic Games
Gold medal – first place	2014 Nanjing	Sprint C1
Men's canoe marathon
World Championships
Silver medal – second place	2025 Győr	C-1 short race
Bronze medal – third place	2026 Gualeguaychú	C-1 short race

Serghei Olegovich Tarnovschi (Ukrainian: Сергій Олегович Тарновський, romanized: Serhiy Olegovich Tarnovsky; born 24 June 1997) is a Ukrainian and Moldovan sprint canoeist. He won two Olympic bronze medals in the men's C-1 1000 metres event, at the 2020 Summer Olympics and the 2024 Summer Olympics.

== Career ==
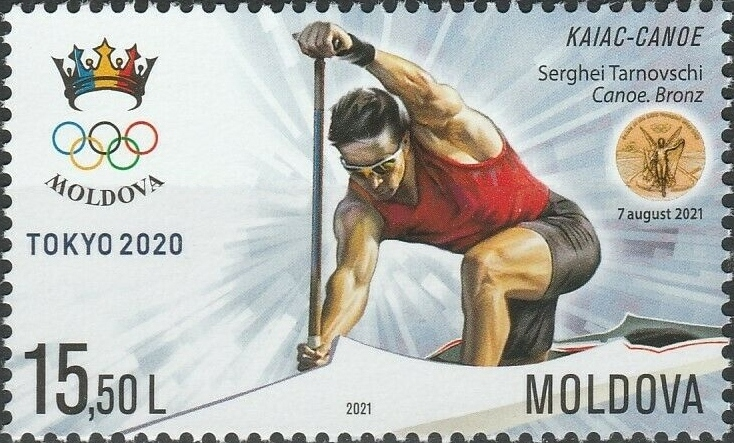
Tarnovschi on a 2021 stamp of Moldova

Tarnovschi represented Moldova at the 2016 Summer Olympics, where he was awarded a bronze medal at Men's C-1 1000 metres. It was subsequently stripped from him due to doping, as on 18 August 2016, he was suspended after failing doping test.

On 30 November 2016, Tarnovschi's lawyer Paul J. Greene admitted that a prohibited substance was in fact found in the athlete's urine sample, claiming that "the substance could not produce any effect".

On 19 August 2016, in a press release, the Olympic Committee of Moldova stated that the prohibited substance in Tarnovschi's urine sample was the Growth Hormone Releasing Peptide.

In an article from 3 November 2016, a Moldova news agency Unimedia stated that the B sample of Tarnovschi's urine also tested positive for GHRP 2. On the same day the MOLDPRES news agency stated that Tarnovschi's Olympic bronze medal will be stripped, and the prize money (2 million MDL) will be withheld until the International Canoe Federation's final decision in his case. ICF held an annual conference on 27 November 2016, in Baku, Azerbaijan, where on 30 November the deliberations in Tarnovschi's doping case took place. According to Moldova National Olympic Committee, the decision was to be made public "in a few weeks".

In a press release from 3 February 2017, the International Canoe Federation announced that Tarnovschi was found guilty, and disqualified for 4 years under Section 2.1 of ICF Anti-Doping Rules, effective from the date that the positive urine sample was obtained on 8 July 2016, and that all results, points, and awards after that date deemed invalid. By consequence, Tarnovshi's bronze Olympic medal will be stripped and passed on Ilia Shtokalov, a Russian athlete who came in 4th in the C1 1000m race in Rio Olympics 2016.

== Major results ==
=== Olympic Games ===
Year	C-1 1000	C-2 1000
2016	DSQ	DNS
2020	3rd place, bronze medalist(s)	
2024	3rd place, bronze medalist(s)	—N/a

=== World championships ===
Year	C-1 500	C-1 1000	C-1 5000	C-2 500	C-2 1000
2015		3rd place, bronze medalist(s)			
2021		6	5		
2022		6	1st place, gold medalist(s)	1 FB	
2023	3rd place, bronze medalist(s)	7	4		
2024	1st place, gold medalist(s)	—N/a	2nd place, silver medalist(s)	—N/a	4

=== European championships ===
Year	C-1 200	C-1 500	C-1 1000	C-1 5000	C-2 500	C-2 1000
2015	1 FB	4				9 SF
2016			2nd place, silver medalist(s)		4	4
2021		2nd place, silver medalist(s)				
2022		2nd place, silver medalist(s)	7			
2023	4	3rd place, bronze medalist(s)	—N/a	—N/a		—N/a
2024		1st place, gold medalist(s)	3rd place, bronze medalist(s)	3rd place, bronze medalist(s)		
