= Mohammad Nabi Rezaei =

Iranian canoeist (born 1999)

Personal information
- Nationality: Iranian
- Born: 10 April 1999 (age 27) Babolsar, Iran

Sport
- Country: Iran
- Sport: Canoe sprint
Medal record
Men's canoe sprint
Representing Iran
Asian Games
Bronze medal – third place	2018 Jakarta–Palembang	C-1 1000 m
Asian Championships
Gold medal – first place	2022 Rayong	C-1 1000 m
Gold medal – first place	2024 Tokyo	C-1 1000 m
Silver medal – second place	2022 Rayong	C-2 200 m
Silver medal – second place	2022 Rayong	C-2 500 m
Silver medal – second place	2025 Nanchang	C-1 1000 m
World U23 Championships
Gold medal – first place	2022 Szeged	C–1 5000 m

Mohammad Nabi Rezaei (Persian: محمدنبی رضایی; born 10 April 1999, in Babolsar) is an Iranian canoeist. He represents Iran at the 2024 Summer Olympics Paris.
