= Connor Fitzpatrick =

Canadian canoeist (born 1998)

Personal information
- Born: April 15, 1998 (age 28) Dartmouth, Nova Scotia, Canada
Medal record
Men's Canoeing
Representing Canada
World Championships
Gold medal – first place	2022 Dartmouth	C-2 Mix 500 m
Gold medal – first place	2023 Duisburg	C-2 Mix 500 m
Pan American Games
Bronze medal – third place	2023 Santiago	C–1 1000 m

Connor Fitzpatrick (born April 15, 1998) is a Canadian canoeist.

== Career ==
In 2019, Fitzpatrick formed a C-2 boat with Roland Varga. They won the C-2 1000m B final in their first World Cup event in Szeged, Hungary and the following week they advanced to the A final. At the World Championships, they placed sixth in the B final of the C-2 1000m.

In 2019, Fitzpatrick and Varga broke the National record at the 2019 World Championships in the C-2 1000m to 3:28.742 in semifinals before finishing second in the B final (11th overall). In May 2021, Fitzpatrick along with Varga were named to their first Olympic team in the C-2 1000 event.
