= Adrien Bart =

French canoeist (born 1991)

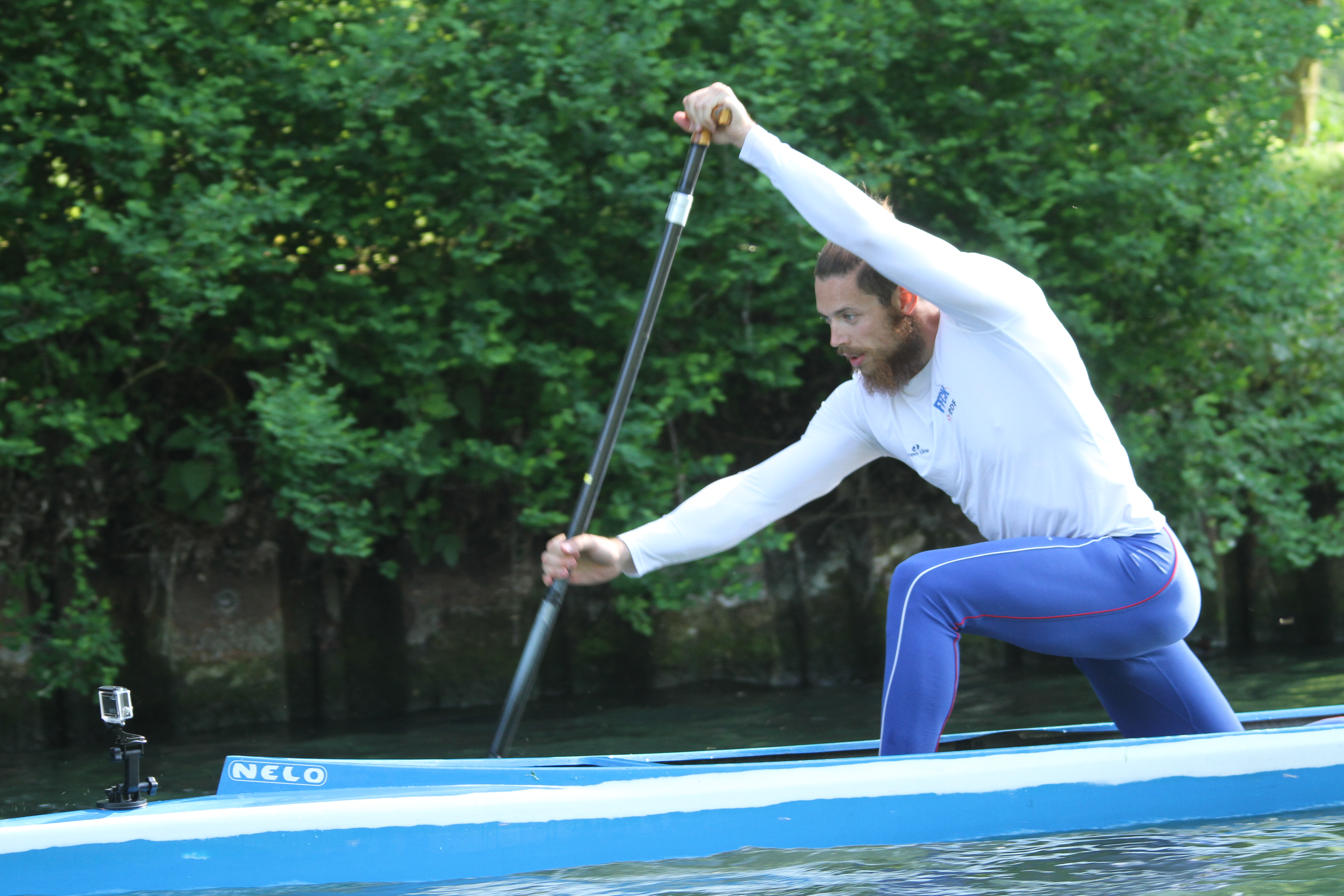
- Adrien Bart in 2016

Personal information
- Nationality: French
- Born: 4 September 1991 (age 35) Orléans, France
- Height: 1.85 m (6 ft 1 in)
- Weight: 90 kg (198 lb)

Sport
- Country: France
- Sport: Sprint canoe
- Event: C-1 1000 m
- Club: ASL Saint-Laurent-Blangy
Medal record
Men's canoe sprint
Representing France
World Championships
Bronze medal – third place	2019 Szeged	C-1 1000 m

Adrien Bart (born 4 September 1991) is a French sprint canoeist. He competed in the men's C-1 1000 metres event at the 2016 Summer Olympics.
