= José Ramón Pelier =

Cuban sprint canoeist (born 2001)

Personal information
- Full name: José Ramón Pelier Córdova
- Nationality: Cuban
- Born: 7 February 2001 (age 25) Baracoa, Guantánamo, Cuba

Sport
- Country: Cuba
- Sport: Canoeing
Medal record
Men's canoe sprint
Representing Cuba
Pan American Games
Gold medal – first place	2023 Santiago	C-1 1000 m
Bronze medal – third place	2023 Santiago	C-2 500 m

José Ramón Pelier Córdova (born 7 February 2001) is a Cuban sprint canoeist who competed in the Men's Canoe Single 1000m event at the 2020 Summer Olympics.

He won a gold medal in the C1 1000m event during stage two of the 2021 Canoe Sprint World Cup in Russia.

== Career highlights ==
Rank	Year	Event	Competition	Location	Result
1	2021	Canoe Single 1000m	World Cup	Barnaul, RUS	4:03.063
1	2019	Canoe Single 1000m	World Cup	Poznan, POL	3:45.142
4	2021	Canoe Single 1000m	World Cup	Szeged, HUN	4:01.79
