= Angel Kodinov =

Bulgarian canoeist (born 1997)

Personal information
- Native name: Ангел Кодинов
- Nationality: Bulgarian
- Born: 4 September 1997 (age 28) Plovdiv, Bulgaria
- Height: 1.89 m (6 ft 2 in)
- Weight: 90 kg (198 lb)

Sport
- Country: Bulgaria
- Sport: Sprint canoe
- Event(s): C-1 1000m, 500 m
Medal record
Men's canoe sprint
Representing Bulgaria
World Championships
Silver medal – second place	2019 Szeged	C-1 500 m

Angel Kodinov (Bulgarian: Ангел Кодинов, born 4 September 1997) is a Bulgarian sprint canoeist. He competed in the men's C-1 1000 metres event at the 2016 Summer Olympics.
