= Pavlo Altukhov =

Ukrainian canoeist (born 1995)

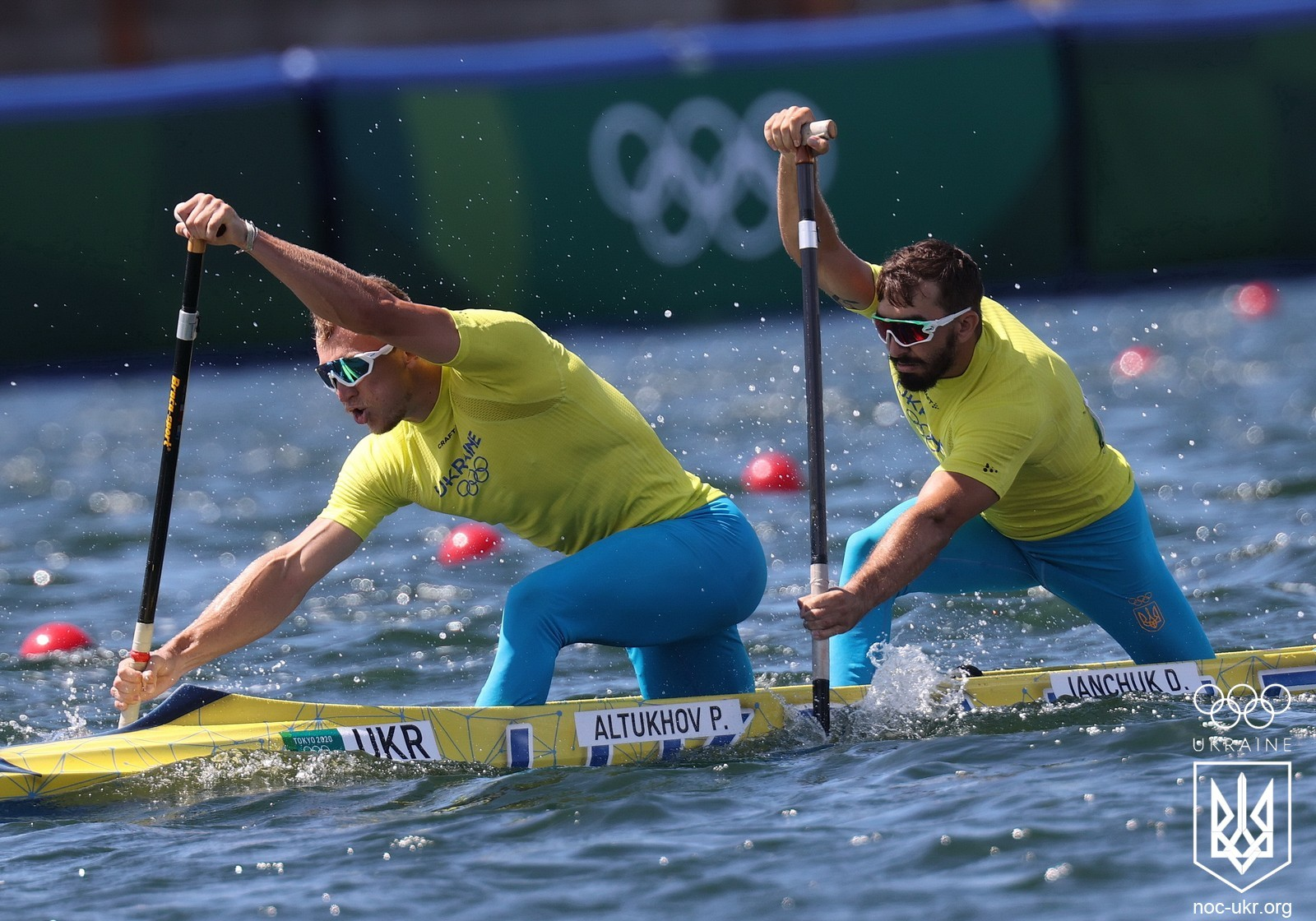
- 2020 Olympics

Personal information
- Born: Павло Сергійович Алтухов; 23 December 1995 (age 30) Khmelnytskyi, Ukraine

Sport
- Sport: Canoe sprint

Pavlo Altukhov (Ukrainian: Павло Сергійович Алтухов; born 23 December 1995) is a Ukrainian canoeist. He competed in the men's C-1 1000 metres event at the 2016 Summer Olympics.
