= 2019 ICF Canoe Sprint World Championships – Men's C-2 1000 metres =

Men's C-2 1000 metres at the 2019 ICF Canoe Sprint World Championships
- Venue: Olympic Centre of Szeged
- Location: Szeged, Hungary
- Dates: 22–24 August
- Competitors: 64 from 32 nations
- Winning time: 3:40.55

Medalists
gold medal	Liu Hao; Wang Hao	China
silver medal	Serguey Torres; Fernando Jorge	Cuba
bronze medal	Erlon Silva; Isaquias Queiroz	Brazil

The men's C-2 1000 metres competition at the 2019 ICF Canoe Sprint World Championships in Szeged took place at the Olympic Centre of Szeged.

== Schedule ==
The schedule was as follows:

Date	Time	Round
Thursday 22 August 2019	09:00	Heats
Friday 23 August 2019	17:32	Semifinals
Saturday 24 August 2019	10:30	Final B
Saturday 24 August 2019	12:03	Final A

All times are Central European Summer Time (UTC+2)

== Results ==
=== Heats ===
The six fastest boats in each heat, plus the three fastest seventh-place boats advanced to the semifinals.

==== Heat 1 ====
Rank	Canoeist	Country	Time	Notes
1	Peter Kretschmer; Yul Oeltze	Germany	3:33.87	QS
2	Adrián Sieiro; Sergio Vallejo	Spain	3:35.05	QS
3	Eduard Shemetylo; Yurii Vandiuk	Ukraine	3:36.98	QS
4	Aivis Tints; Gatis Pranks	Latvia	3:38.97	QS
5	Henrikas Žustautas; Ilja Davidovskij	Lithuania	3:51.11	QS
6	Gaurav Tomar; Sunil Singh Salam	India	3:54.50	QS
7	Hwang Seon-hong; Kim Yi-yeol	South Korea	3:54.69	qS
8	Mussa Chamaune; Nordino Mussa	Mozambique	4:22.34	

==== Heat 2 ====
Rank	Canoeist	Country	Time	Notes
1	Erlon Silva; Isaquias Queiroz	Brazil	3:29.32	QS
2	Ilya Pervukhin; Kirill Shamshurin	Russia	3:30.51	QS
3	Michał Kudła; Mateusz Kamiński	Poland	3:30.57	QS
4	Victor Mihalachi; Cătălin Chirilă	Romania	3:31.63	QS
5	Róbert Mike; Balázs Kiss	Hungary	3:32.27	QS
6	Oleg Tarnovschi; Oleg Nuţa	Moldova	3:45.13	QS
7	Yutthana Porananon; Pitpiboon Mahawattanangkul	Thailand	3:55.58	qS
8	Nadir Boukhari-Sardi; Hadj-Khlifa Dernani	Algeria	4:22.59	

==== Heat 3 ====
Rank	Canoeist	Country	Time	Notes
1	Roland Varga; Connor Fitzpatrick	Canada	3:31.36	QS
2	Daniele Santini; Luca Incollingo	Italy	3:32.79	QS
3	Sergey Yemelyanov; Timofey Yemelyanov	Kazakhstan	3:33.71	QS
4	Adrien Bart; Loïc Leonard	France	3:34.86	QS
5	Takanori Tome; Kaiki Oshiro	Japan	3:41.94	QS
6	Andrei Bahdanovich; Vitali Asetski	Belarus	3:49.11	QS
7	Ryan Grady; Jonathan Grady	United States	3:54.30	qS
8	Manuel Antonio; Benilson Sanda	Angola	4:13.38	

==== Heat 4 ====
Rank	Canoeist	Country	Time	Notes
1	Liu Hao; Wang Hao	China	3:26.06	QS
2	Serguey Torres; Fernando Jorge	Cuba	3:26.73	QS
3	Martin Fuksa; Petr Fuksa	Czech Republic	3:31.46	QS
4	Rigoberto Camilo; Guillermo Quirino	Mexico	3:39.55	QS
5	Gerasim Kochnev; Bekzodbek Umaraliev	Uzbekistan	3:42.02	QS
6	Bruno Afonso; Marco Apura	Portugal	4:04.49	QS
7	Buly Da Conceição Triste; Roque Fernandes Dos Ramos	São Tomé and Príncipe	4:08.18	
–	Daniel Leon; Cristian Sola	Ecuador	DNS	

=== Semifinals ===
Qualification in each semi was as follows:

The fastest three boats advanced to the A final.
The next three fastest boats advanced to the B final.

==== Semifinal 1 ====
Rank	Canoeist	Country	Time	Notes
1	Peter Kretschmer; Yul Oeltze	Germany	3:28.17	QA
2	Ilya Pervukhin; Kirill Shamshurin	Russia	3:28.60	QA
3	Martin Fuksa; Petr Fuksa	Czech Republic	3:29.04	QA
4	Daniele Santini; Luca Incollingo	Italy	3:29.84	QB
5	Takanori Tome; Kaiki Oshiro	Japan	3:32.20	QB
6	Rigoberto Camilo; Guillermo Quirino	Mexico	3:45.79	QB
7	Ryan Grady; Jonathan Grady	United States	3:53.65	
8	Oleg Tarnovschi; Oleg Nuţa	Moldova	4:09.05	
–	Henrikas Žustautas; Ilja Davidovskij	Lithuania	DSQ	

==== Semifinal 2 ====
Rank	Canoeist	Country	Time	Notes
1	Erlon Silva; Isaquias Queiroz	Brazil	3:27.34	QA
2	Serguey Torres; Fernando Jorge	Cuba	3:28.70	QA
3	Eduard Shemetylo; Yurii Vandiuk	Ukraine	3:30.53	QA
4	Adrien Bart; Loïc Leonard	France	3:31.00	QB
5	Róbert Mike; Balázs Kiss	Hungary	3:33.09	QB
6	Aivis Tints; Gatis Pranks	Latvia	3:33.80	QB
7	Sergey Yemelyanov; Timofey Yemelyanov	Kazakhstan	3:34.04	
8	Bruno Afonso; Marco Apura	Portugal	4:09.62	
9	Hwang Seon-hong; Kim Yi-yeol	South Korea	4:09.72	

==== Semifinal 3 ====
Rank	Canoeist	Country	Time	Notes
1	Liu Hao; Wang Hao	China	3:24.08	QA
2	Michał Kudła; Mateusz Kamiński	Poland	3:25.95	QA
3	Victor Mihalachi; Cătălin Chirilă	Romania	3:26.63	QA
4	Roland Varga; Connor Fitzpatrick	Canada	3:28.74	QB
5	Adrián Sieiro; Sergio Vallejo	Spain	3:31.50	QB
6	Gerasim Kochnev; Bekzodbek Umaraliev	Uzbekistan	3:34.31	QB
7	Gaurav Tomar; Sunil Singh Salam	India	3:46.34	
8	Yutthana Porananon; Pitpiboon Mahawattanangkul	Thailand	3:58.72	
–	Andrei Bahdanovich; Vitali Asetski	Belarus	DNF	

=== Finals ===
==== Final B ====
Competitors in this final raced for positions 10 to 18.

Rank	Canoeist	Country	Time
1	Adrien Bart; Loïc Leonard	France	3:45.32
2	Roland Varga; Connor Fitzpatrick	Canada	3:46.17
3	Róbert Mike; Balázs Kiss	Hungary	3:46.97
4	Takanori Tome; Kaiki Oshiro	Japan	3:47.68
5	Adrián Sieiro; Sergio Vallejo	Spain	3:48.45
6	Daniele Santini; Luca Incollingo	Italy	3:48.51
7	Gerasim Kochnev; Bekzodbek Umaraliev	Uzbekistan	3:50.67
8	Aivis Tints; Gatis Pranks	Latvia	3:51.67
9	Rigoberto Camilo; Guillermo Quirino	Mexico	3:53.03

==== Final A ====
Competitors raced for positions 1 to 9, with medals going to the top three.

Rank	Canoeist	Country	Time
1st place, gold medalist(s)	Liu Hao; Wang Hao	China	3:40.55
2nd place, silver medalist(s)	Serguey Torres; Fernando Jorge	Cuba	3:41.46
3rd place, bronze medalist(s)	Erlon Silva; Isaquias Queiroz	Brazil	3:44.34
4	Peter Kretschmer; Yul Oeltze	Germany	3:45.17
5	Victor Mihalachi; Cătălin Chirilă	Romania	3:45.34
6	Michał Kudła; Mateusz Kamiński	Poland	3:46.93
7	Ilya Pervukhin; Kirill Shamshurin	Russia	3:47.80
8	Eduard Shemetylo; Yurii Vandiuk	Ukraine	3:49.50
9	Martin Fuksa; Petr Fuksa	Czech Republic	4:02.02
