= 2017 ICF Canoe Sprint World Championships – Men's C-2 1000 metres =

Men's C-2 1000 metres at the 2017 ICF Canoe Sprint World Championships
- Venue: Sportcentrum Račice
- Location: Račice, Czech Republic
- Dates: 25–27 August
- Competitors: 46 from 23 nations
- Winning time: 3:31.613

Medalists
gold medal	Peter Kretschmer; Yul Oeltze	Germany
silver medal	Serguey Torres; Fernando Enriquez	Cuba
bronze medal	Viktor Melantyev; Vladislav Chebotar	Russia

The men's C-2 1000 metres competition at the 2017 ICF Canoe Sprint World Championships in Račice took place at the Sportcentrum Račice.

== Schedule ==
The schedule was as follows:

Date	Time	Round
Friday 25 August 2017	09:14	Heats
Saturday 26 August 2017	15:27	Semifinals
Sunday 27 August 2017	09:21	Final B
Sunday 27 August 2017	10:31	Final A

All times are Central European Summer Time (UTC+2)

== Results ==
=== Heats ===
Heat winners advanced directly to the A final. The next six fastest boats in each heat advanced to the semifinals.

==== Heat 1 ====
Rank	Canoeists	Country	Time	Notes
1	Daniele Santini; Luca Incollingo	Italy	3:36.504	QA
2	Peter Kretschmer; Yul Oeltze	Germany	3:36.910	QS
3	Loïc Leonard; Adrien Bart	France	3:39.026	QS
4	Sergey Yemelyanov; Timofey Yemelyanov	Kazakhstan	3:39.160	QS
5	Erlon Silva; Isaquias Queiroz	Brazil	3:47.476	QS
6	Iain Weir; Jonathan Jones	Great Britain	3:49.282	QS
7	Hélder Silva; Nuno Silva	Portugal	3:54.182	QS
8	Anwar Tarra; Dedi Saputra	Indonesia	4:04.438	
9	Andrei Bahdanovich; Dzianis Makhlai	Belarus	4:20.143	

==== Heat 2 ====
Rank	Canoeists	Country	Time	Notes
1	Viktor Melantyev; Vladislav Chebotar	Russia	3:36.336	QA
2	Dávid Korisánszky; Róbert Mike	Hungary	3:38.325	QS
3	Filip Dvořák; Tomáš Janda	Czech Republic	3:43.941	QS
4	Ilie Sprincean; Oleg Nuţa	Moldova	3:47.397	QS
5	Serguey Torres; Fernando Enriquez	Cuba	3:47.975	QS
6	Gaurav Tomar; Ajit Kumar Sha	India	4:06.825	QS
7	Osvaldas Murza; Jevgenij Kuracionok	Lithuania	4:13.747	QS

==== Heat 3 ====
Rank	Canoeists	Country	Time	Notes
1	Mateusz Kamiński; Vincent Slominski	Poland	3:37.774	QA
2	Leonid Carp; Victor Mihalachi	Romania	3:37.952	QS
3	Dmytro Ianchuk; Taras Mishchuk	Ukraine	3:41.629	QS
4	Hikaru Sato; Takanori Tome	Japan	3:41.990	QS
5	Aivis Tints; Gatis Pranks	Latvia	3:43.963	QS
6	Sergio Vallejo; Adrián Sieiro	Spain	3:53.896	QS
7	Mark Oldershaw; Mark James	Canada	4:07.468	QS

=== Semifinals ===
Qualification was as follows:

The fastest three boats in each semi advanced to the A final.
The next four fastest boats in each semi, plus the fastest remaining boat advanced to the B final.

==== Semifinal 1 ====
Rank	Canoeists	Country	Time	Notes
1	Erlon Silva; Isaquias Queiroz	Brazil	3:43.435	QA
2	Leonid Carp; Victor Mihalachi	Romania	3:44.219	QA
3	Loïc Leonard; Adrien Bart	France	3:44.597	QA
4	Filip Dvořák; Tomáš Janda	Czech Republic	3:44.797	QB
5	Hikaru Sato; Takanori Tome	Japan	3:47.235	QB
6	Mark Oldershaw; Mark James	Canada	3:51.763	QB
7	Ilie Sprincean; Oleg Nuţa	Moldova	3:54.130	QB
8	Iain Weir; Jonathan Jones	Great Britain	3:55.635	
9	Gaurav Tomar; Ajit Kumar Sha	India	4:19.052	

==== Semifinal 2 ====
Rank	Canoeists	Country	Time	Notes
1	Serguey Torres; Fernando Enriquez	Cuba	3:41.192	QA
2	Peter Kretschmer; Yul Oeltze	Germany	3:41.498	QA
3	Dávid Korisánszky; Róbert Mike	Hungary	3:42.164	QA
4	Sergio Vallejo; Adrián Sieiro	Spain	3:42.648	QB
5	Dmytro Ianchuk; Taras Mishchuk	Ukraine	3:43.398	QB
6	Sergey Yemelyanov; Timofey Yemelyanov	Kazakhstan	3:44.437	QB
7	Aivis Tints; Gatis Pranks	Latvia	3:44.948	QB
8	Osvaldas Murza; Jevgenij Kuracionok	Lithuania	3:53.475	qB
9	Hélder Silva; Nuno Silva	Portugal	3:55.648	

=== Finals ===
==== Final B ====
Competitors in this final raced for positions 10 to 18.

Rank	Canoeists	Country	Time
1	Sergio Vallejo; Adrián Sieiro	Spain	3:38.843
2	Sergey Yemelyanov; Timofey Yemelyanov	Kazakhstan	3:40.087
3	Hikaru Sato; Takanori Tome	Japan	3:40.570
4	Aivis Tints; Gatis Pranks	Latvia	3:41.076
5	Dmytro Ianchuk; Taras Mishchuk	Ukraine	3:41.170
6	Ilie Sprincean; Oleg Nuţa	Moldova	3:42.365
7	Filip Dvořák; Tomáš Janda	Czech Republic	3:42.631
8	Osvaldas Murza; Jevgenij Kuracionok	Lithuania	3:43.915
9	Mark Oldershaw; Mark James	Canada	3:51.720

==== Final A ====
Competitors in this final raced for positions 1 to 9, with medals going to the top three.

Rank	Canoeists	Country	Time
1st place, gold medalist(s)	Peter Kretschmer; Yul Oeltze	Germany	3:31.613
2nd place, silver medalist(s)	Serguey Torres; Fernando Enriquez	Cuba	3:31.955
3rd place, bronze medalist(s)	Viktor Melantyev; Vladislav Chebotar	Russia	3:33.123
4	Erlon Silva; Isaquias Queiroz	Brazil	3:34.323
5	Leonid Carp; Victor Mihalachi	Romania	3:34.392
6	Daniele Santini; Luca Incollingo	Italy	3:34.823
7	Mateusz Kamiński; Vincent Slominski	Poland	3:35.708
8	Loïc Leonard; Adrien Bart	France	3:37.697
9	Dávid Korisánszky; Róbert Mike	Hungary	3:37.939
