= 2018 ICF Canoe Sprint World Championships – Men's C-2 1000 metres =

2018 ICF Canoe Sprint World Championships event

Men's C-2 1000 metres at the 2018 ICF Canoe Sprint World Championships
- Venue: Centro de Alto Rendimento de Montemor-o-Velho
- Location: Montemor-o-Velho, Portugal
- Dates: 23–24 August
- Competitors: 40 from 20 nations
- Winning time: 3:38.207

Medalists
gold medal	Yul Oeltze; Peter Kretschmer	Germany
silver medal	Serguey Torres; Fernando Jorge	Cuba
bronze medal	Kirill Shamshurin; Ilya Pervukhin	Russia

The men's C-2 1000 metres competition at the 2018 ICF Canoe Sprint World Championships in Montemor-o-Velho took place at the Centro de Alto Rendimento de Montemor-o-Velho.

== Schedule ==
The schedule was as follows:

Date	Time	Round
Thursday 23 August 2018	10:05	Heats
Friday 24 August 2018	09:44	Semifinals
Friday 24 August 2018	14:50	Final B
Friday 24 August 2018	15:34	Final A

All times are Western European Summer Time (UTC+1)

== Results ==
=== Heats ===
Heat winners advanced directly to the A final. The next six fastest boats in each heat advanced to the semifinals.

==== Heat 1 ====
Rank	Canoeists	Country	Time	Notes
1	Daniele Santini; Luca Incollingo	Italy	3:38.627	QA
2	Mateusz Kamiński; Vincent Slominski	Poland	3:38.897	QS
3	Aivis Tints; Gatis Pranks	Latvia	3:43.722	QS
4	Yurii Vandiuk; Andrii Rybachok	Ukraine	3:48.427	QS
5	Vladislav Lukashuk; Ivan Patapenka	Belarus	4:16.684	QS
6	Yul Oeltze; Peter Kretschmer	Germany	4:17.704	QS
7	Mussa Chamaune; Nordino Mussa	Mozambique	4:40.795	QS

==== Heat 2 ====
Rank	Canoeists	Country	Time	Notes
1	Serguey Torres; Fernando Jorge	Cuba	3:39.383	QA
2	Leonid Carp; Victor Mihalachi	Romania	3:42.683	QS
3	Roland Varga; Connor Fitzpatrick	Canada	3:43.023	QS
4	Thomas Simart; Adrien Bart	France	3:43.683	QS
5	Bruno Afonso; Marco Apura	Portugal	3:52.889	QS
6	Ilie Sprincean; Oleg Nuţa	Moldova	4:04.824	QS
7	Aoto Yabu; Masato Hashimoto	Japan	4:16.000	QS

==== Heat 3 ====
Rank	Canoeists	Country	Time	Notes
1	Kirill Shamshurin; Ilya Pervukhin	Russia	3:39.092	QA
2	Filip Dvořák; Tomáš Janda	Czech Republic	3:40.727	QS
3	Sergio Vallejo; Adrián Sieiro	Spain	3:42.612	QS
4	Dávid Korisánszky; Róbert Mike	Hungary	3:42.662	QS
5	Erlon Silva; Maico Santos	Brazil	3:42.987	QS
6	Ilja Davidovskij; Henrikas Žustautas	Lithuania	3:49.853	QS

=== Semifinals ===
Qualification was as follows:

The fastest three boats in each semi advanced to the A final.
The next four fastest boats in each semi, plus the fastest remaining boat advanced to the B final.

==== Semifinal 1 ====
Rank	Canoeists	Country	Time	Notes
1	Yul Oeltze; Peter Kretschmer	Germany	3:34.655	QA
2	Sergio Vallejo; Adrián Sieiro	Spain	3:35.775	QA
3	Mateusz Kamiński; Vincent Slominski	Poland	3:35.875	QA
4	Yurii Vandiuk; Andrii Rybachok	Ukraine	3:37.395	QB
5	Dávid Korisánszky; Róbert Mike	Hungary	3:40.545	QB
6	Roland Varga; Connor Fitzpatrick	Canada	3:41.515	QB
7	Ilja Davidovskij; Henrikas Žustautas	Lithuania	3:44.605	QB
8	Bruno Afonso; Marco Apura	Portugal	3:51.386	qB
9	Aoto Yabu; Masato Hashimoto	Japan	3:57.396	

==== Semifinal 2 ====
Rank	Canoeists	Country	Time	Notes
1	Thomas Simart; Adrien Bart	France	3:35.435	QA
2	Leonid Carp; Victor Mihalachi	Romania	3:36.810	QA
3	Filip Dvořák; Tomáš Janda	Czech Republic	3:37.005	QA
4	Erlon Silva; Maico Santos	Brazil	3:37.135	QB
5	Ilie Sprincean; Oleg Nuţa	Moldova	3:37.931	QB
6	Aivis Tints; Gatis Pranks	Latvia	3:38.666	QB
7	Vladislav Lukashuk; Ivan Patapenka	Belarus	3:48.226	QB
8	Mussa Chamaune; Nordino Mussa	Mozambique	4:40.379	

=== Finals ===
==== Final B ====
Competitors in this final raced for positions 10 to 18.

Rank	Canoeists	Country	Time
1	Yurii Vandiuk; Andrii Rybachok	Ukraine	3:43.185
2	Aivis Tints; Gatis Pranks	Latvia	3:43.360
3	Erlon Silva; Maico Santos	Brazil	3:44.315
4	Dávid Korisánszky; Róbert Mike	Hungary	3:44.575
5	Ilja Davidovskij; Henrikas Žustautas	Lithuania	3:46.065
6	Roland Varga; Connor Fitzpatrick	Canada	3:46.115
7	Vladislav Lukashuk; Ivan Patapenka	Belarus	3:50.250
8	Bruno Afonso; Marco Apura	Portugal	3:50.485
9	Ilie Sprincean; Oleg Nuţa	Moldova	4:09.486

==== Final A ====
Competitors in this final raced for positions 1 to 9, with medals going to the top three.

Rank	Canoeists	Country	Time
1st place, gold medalist(s)	Yul Oeltze; Peter Kretschmer	Germany	3:38.207
2nd place, silver medalist(s)	Serguey Torres; Fernando Jorge	Cuba	3:39.462
3rd place, bronze medalist(s)	Kirill Shamshurin; Ilya Pervukhin	Russia	3:40.647
4	Mateusz Kamiński; Vincent Slominski	Poland	3:42.217
5	Daniele Santini; Luca Incollingo	Italy	3:42.277
6	Thomas Simart; Adrien Bart	France	3:44.792
7	Filip Dvořák; Tomáš Janda	Czech Republic	3:45.837
8	Sergio Vallejo; Adrián Sieiro	Spain	3:46.042
9	Leonid Carp; Victor Mihalachi	Romania	3:52.532
