= 2017 ICF Canoe Sprint World Championships – Men's C-2 500 metres =

Canoe Sprint World Championships

Men's C-2 500 metres at the 2017 ICF Canoe Sprint World Championships
- Venue: Sportcentrum Račice
- Location: Račice, Czech Republic
- Dates: 24–26 August
- Competitors: 32 from 16 nations
- Winning time: 1:38.868

Medalists
gold medal	Ivan Shtyl; Viktor Melantyev	Russia
silver medal	Victor Mihalachi; Leonid Carp	Romania
bronze medal	Sergiu Craciun; Nicolae Craciun	Italy

The men's C-2 500 metres competition at the 2017 ICF Canoe Sprint World Championships in Račice took place at the Sportcentrum Račice.

== Schedule ==
The schedule was as follows:

Date	Time	Round
Thursday 24 August 2017	09:12	Heats
Thursday 24 August 2017	16:00	Semifinal
Saturday 26 August 2017	10:47	Final

All times are Central European Summer Time (UTC+2)

== Results ==
=== Heats ===
The fastest three boats in each heat advanced directly to the final. The next four fastest boats in each heat, plus the fastest remaining boat advanced to the semifinal.

==== Heat 1 ====
Rank	Canoeists	Country	Time	Notes
1	Ivan Shtyl; Viktor Melantyev	Russia	1:42.516	QF
2	Conrad Scheibner; Stefan Kiraj	Germany	1:43.549	QF
3	Dávid Korisánszky; Róbert Mike	Hungary	1:43.788	QF
4	Ilie Sprincean; Oleg Nuţa	Moldova	1:43.988	QS
5	Andrei Bahdanovich; Dzianis Makhlai	Belarus	1:44.282	QS
6	Roland Varga; Drew Hodges	Canada	1:46.632	QS
7	Petr Fuksa; Daniel Kořínek	Czech Republic	1:47.643	QS
8	Anwar Tarra; Dedi Saputra	Indonesia	1:51.966	qS
9	Taito Ambo; Makoto Nishikawa	Japan	1:52.788	

==== Heat 2 ====
Rank	Canoeists	Country	Time	Notes
1	Victor Mihalachi; Leonid Carp	Romania	1:41.438	QF
2	Wiktor Głazunow; Tomasz Barniak	Poland	1:42.099	QF
3	Dmytro Ianchuk; Taras Mishchuk	Ukraine	1:42.733	QF
4	Sergiu Craciun; Nicolae Craciun	Italy	1:44.194	QS
5	Mohssine Moutahir; Gonzalo Martín	Spain	1:46.960	QS
6	Sergey Yemelyanov; Timofey Yemelyanov	Kazakhstan	1:47.694	QS
7	Gaurav Tomar; Ajit Kumar Sha	India	1:55.160	QS

=== Semifinal ===
The fastest three boats advanced to the final.

Rank	Canoeists	Country	Time	Notes
1	Sergiu Craciun; Nicolae Craciun	Italy	1:43.236	QF
2	Andrei Bahdanovich; Dzianis Makhlai	Belarus	1:44.902	QF
3	Ilie Sprincean; Oleg Nuţa	Moldova	1:45.297	QF
4	Sergey Yemelyanov; Timofey Yemelyanov	Kazakhstan	1:45.352	
5	Mohssine Moutahir; Gonzalo Martín	Spain	1:46.824	
6	Petr Fuksa; Daniel Kořínek	Czech Republic	1:47.330	
7	Roland Varga; Drew Hodges	Canada	1:47.591	
8	Anwar Tarra; Dedi Saputra	Indonesia	1:52.419	
9	Gaurav Tomar; Ajit Kumar Sha	India	1:53.908	

=== Final ===
Competitors raced for positions 1 to 9, with medals going to the top three.

Rank	Canoeists	Country	Time
1st place, gold medalist(s)	Ivan Shtyl; Viktor Melantyev	Russia	1:38.868
2nd place, silver medalist(s)	Victor Mihalachi; Leonid Carp	Romania	1:39.796
3rd place, bronze medalist(s)	Sergiu Craciun; Nicolae Craciun	Italy	1:39.979
4	Wiktor Głazunow; Tomasz Barniak	Poland	1:40.935
5	Dmytro Ianchuk; Taras Mishchuk	Ukraine	1:41.624
6	Ilie Sprincean; Oleg Nuţa	Moldova	1:42.324
7	Dávid Korisánszky; Róbert Mike	Hungary	1:42.496
8	Andrei Bahdanovich; Dzianis Makhlai	Belarus	1:43.163
9	Conrad Scheibner; Stefan Kiraj	Germany	1:51.951
