= 2018 ICF Canoe Sprint World Championships – Men's C-2 500 metres =

Canoe Sprint World Championships

Men's C-2 500 metres at the 2018 ICF Canoe Sprint World Championships
- Venue: Centro de Alto Rendimento de Montemor-o-Velho
- Location: Montemor-o-Velho, Portugal
- Dates: 25–26 August
- Competitors: 34 from 17 nations
- Winning time: 1:40.043

Medalists
gold medal	Erlon Silva; Isaquias Queiroz	Brazil
silver medal	Viktor Melantyev; Vladislav Chebotar	Russia
bronze medal	Arsen Śliwiński; Michał Lubniewski	Poland

The men's C-2 500 metres competition at the 2018 ICF Canoe Sprint World Championships in Montemor-o-Velho took place at the Centro de Alto Rendimento de Montemor-o-Velho.

== Schedule ==
The schedule was as follows:

Date	Time	Round
Saturday 25 August 2018	16:29	Heats
Saturday 25 August 2018	18:00	Semifinal
Sunday 26 August 2018	12:54	Final

All times are Western European Summer Time (UTC+1)

== Results ==
=== Heats ===
The fastest three boats in each heat advanced directly to the final. The next four fastest boats in each heat, plus the fastest remaining boat advanced to the semifinal.

==== Heat 1 ====
Rank	Canoeists	Country	Time	Notes
1	Arsen Śliwiński; Michał Lubniewski	Poland	1:46.335	QF
2	Viktor Melantyev; Vladislav Chebotar	Russia	1:46.755	QF
3	Dmytro Ianchuk; Taras Mishchuk	Ukraine	1:47.122	QF
4	Sergio Vallejo; Adrián Sieiro	Spain	1:48.605	QS
5	Roland Varga; Connor Fitzpatrick	Canada	1:48.682	QS
6	Yul Oeltze; Peter Kretschmer	Germany	1:49.038	QS
7	Siarhei Pryvolkin; Evgeniy Tenhel	Belarus	1:49.148	QS
8	Petr Fuksa; Martin Fuksa	Czech Republic	1:50.505	qS
9	Aoto Yabu; Masato Hashimoto	Japan	1:54.349	

==== Heat 2 ====
Rank	Canoeists	Country	Time	Notes
1	Erlon Silva; Isaquias Queiroz	Brazil	1:44.718	QF
2	Jonatán Hajdu; Ádám Fekete	Hungary	1:47.255	QF
3	Leonid Carp; Victor Mihalachi	Romania	1:47.928	QF
4	Ilie Sprincean; Oleg Nuţa	Moldova	1:52.005	QS
5	Osvaldas Murza; Jevgenij Kuracionok	Lithuania	1:53.332	QS
6	Nicolae Craciun; Sergiu Craciun	Italy	1:56.379	QS
7	Bruno Afonso; Marco Apura	Portugal	2:01.062	QS
8	Nordino Mussa; Joaquim Lobo	Mozambique	2:13.432	

=== Semifinal ===
The fastest three boats advanced to the final.

Rank	Canoeists	Country	Time	Notes
1	Yul Oeltze; Peter Kretschmer	Germany	1:44.817	QF
2	Sergio Vallejo; Adrián Sieiro	Spain	1:45.124	QF
3	Ilie Sprincean; Oleg Nuţa	Moldova	1:45.341	QF
4	Nicolae Craciun; Sergiu Craciun	Italy	1:45.941	
5	Petr Fuksa; Martin Fuksa	Czech Republic	1:46.471	
6	Bruno Afonso; Marco Apura	Portugal	1:47.151	
7	Roland Varga; Connor Fitzpatrick	Canada	1:48.268	
8	Osvaldas Murza; Jevgenij Kuracionok	Lithuania	1:48.931	
9	Siarhei Pryvolkin; Evgeniy Tenhel	Belarus	1:49.131	

=== Final ===
Competitors raced for positions 1 to 9, with medals going to the top three.

Rank	Canoeists	Country	Time
1st place, gold medalist(s)	Erlon Silva; Isaquias Queiroz	Brazil	1:40.043
2nd place, silver medalist(s)	Viktor Melantyev; Vladislav Chebotar	Russia	1:41.590
3rd place, bronze medalist(s)	Arsen Śliwiński; Michał Lubniewski	Poland	1:41.787
4	Sergio Vallejo; Adrián Sieiro	Spain	1:41.830
5	Yul Oeltze; Peter Kretschmer	Germany	1:41.997
6	Jonatán Hajdu; Ádám Fekete	Hungary	1:42.047
7	Leonid Carp; Victor Mihalachi	Romania	1:42.650
8	Dmytro Ianchuk; Taras Mishchuk	Ukraine	1:43.300
9	Ilie Sprincean; Oleg Nuţa	Moldova	1:43.917
