= Michał Łubniewski =

Polish canoeist (born 1993)

Personal information
- Full name: Michał Marek Łubniewski
- Nationality: Polish
- Born: 20 October 1993 (age 32)

Sport
- Country: Poland
- Sport: Canoe sprint
- Club: Stomil Poznan
Medal record
Men's canoe sprint
Representing Poland
World Championships
Silver medal – second place	2017 Račice	C-2 200 m
Silver medal – second place	2018 Montemor-o-Velho	C-2 200 m
Silver medal – second place	2019 Szeged	C-2 200 m
Silver medal – second place	2021 Copenhagen	C-4 500 m
Silver medal – second place	2021 Copenhagen	C-2 Mix 200 m
Bronze medal – third place	2018 Montemor-o-Velho	C-2 500 m
European Championships
Silver medal – second place	2021 Poznań	C-2 200 m
Bronze medal – third place	2018 Belgrade	C-2 200 m
Bronze medal – third place	2018 Belgrade	C-4 500 m

Michał Marek Łubniewski (born 20 October 1993) is a Polish sprint canoeist. He participated at the 2018 ICF Canoe Sprint World Championships.
