= 2019 ICF Canoe Sprint World Championships – Men's C-4 500 metres =

Men's C-4 500 metres at the 2019 ICF Canoe Sprint World Championships
- Venue: Olympic Centre of Szeged
- Location: Szeged, Hungary
- Dates: 22–25 August
- Competitors: 40 from 10 nations
- Winning time: 1:34.69

Medalists
gold medal	Ivan Shtyl; Pavel Petrov; Viktor Melantyev; Mikhail Pavlov	Russia
silver medal	Jan Vandrey; Conrad-Robin Scheibner; Tim Hecker; Moritz Adam	Germany
bronze medal	Andrei Bahdanovich; Evgeniy Tengel; Maksim Krysko; Vitali Asetski	Belarus

The men's C-4 500 metres competition at the 2019 ICF Canoe Sprint World Championships in Szeged took place at the Olympic Centre of Szeged.

== Schedule ==
The schedule was as follows:

Date	Time	Round
Thursday 22 August 2019	16:45	Heats
Saturday 24 August 2019	17:00	Semifinal
Sunday 25 August 2019	13:01	Final

All times are Central European Summer Time (UTC+2)

== Results ==
=== Heats ===
The fastest three boats in each heat advanced directly to the final.
The next four fastest boats in each heat, plus the fastest remaining boat advanced to the semifinal.

==== Heat 1 ====
Rank	Canoeists	Country	Time	Notes
1	Marcin Grzybowski; Aleksander Kitewski; Tomasz Barniak; Wiktor Głazunow	Poland	1:31.23	QF
2	Dávid Korisánszky; Róbert Mike; Tamás Bakó; Mátyás Sáfrán	Hungary	1:34.16	QF
3	Leonid Carp; Constantin Diba; Gheorghe Stoian; Ștefan-Andrei Strat	Romania	1:34.96	QF
4	David Fernández; Mohssine Moutahir; Ignacio Calvo; Pablo Martínez	Spain	1:36.60	QS
5	Raju Rawat; Sunil Singh Salam; Vivek Kumar; Shourabh	India	1:48.43	QS

==== Heat 2 ====
Rank	Canoeists	Country	Time	Notes
1	Ivan Shtyl; Pavel Petrov; Viktor Melantyev; Mikhail Pavlov	Russia	1:30.54	QF
2	Eduard Shemetylo; Yurii Vandiuk; Oleh Borovyk; Volodymyr Trotsiuk	Ukraine	1:31.56	QF
3	Andrei Bahdanovich; Evgeniy Tengel; Maksim Krysko; Vitali Asetski	Belarus	1:33.71	QF
4	Jan Vandrey; Conrad-Robin Scheibner; Tim Hecker; Moritz Adam	Germany	1:35.46	QS
5	Kryštof Hájek; Daniel Kořínek; Ivan Procházka; Antonín Hrabal	Czech Republic	1:37.45	QS

=== Semifinal ===
The fastest three boats advanced to the final.

Rank	Canoeists	Country	Time	Notes
1	Jan Vandrey; Conrad-Robin Scheibner; Tim Hecker; Moritz Adam	Germany	1:33.94	QF
2	Kryštof Hájek; Daniel Kořínek; Ivan Procházka; Antonín Hrabal	Czech Republic	1:38.21	QF
3	David Fernández; Mohssine Moutahir; Ignacio Calvo; Pablo Martínez	Spain	1:39.35	QF
4	Raju Rawat; Sunil Singh Salam; Vivek Kumar; Shourabh	India	1:46.80	

=== Final ===
Competitors raced for positions 1 to 9, with medals going to the top three.

Rank	Canoeists	Country	Time
1st place, gold medalist(s)	Ivan Shtyl; Pavel Petrov; Viktor Melantyev; Mikhail Pavlov	Russia	1:34.69
2nd place, silver medalist(s)	Jan Vandrey; Conrad-Robin Scheibner; Tim Hecker; Moritz Adam	Germany	1:35.83
3rd place, bronze medalist(s)	Andrei Bahdanovich; Evgeniy Tengel; Maksim Krysko; Vitali Asetski	Belarus	1:37.14
4	Eduard Shemetylo; Yurii Vandiuk; Oleh Borovyk; Volodymyr Trotsiuk	Ukraine	1:37.68
5	Dávid Korisánszky; Róbert Mike; Tamás Bakó; Mátyás Sáfrán	Hungary	1:39.17
6	David Fernández; Mohssine Moutahir; Ignacio Calvo; Pablo Martínez	Spain	1:39.25
7	Leonid Carp; Constantin Diba; Gheorghe Stoian; Ștefan-Andrei Strat	Romania	1:41.63
8	Kryštof Hájek; Daniel Kořínek; Ivan Procházka; Antonín Hrabal	Czech Republic	1:42.43
9	Marcin Grzybowski; Aleksander Kitewski; Tomasz Barniak; Wiktor Głazunow	Poland	1:50.20
