= Canoe sprint at the 2019 European Games – Men's C-2 1000 metres =

Men's C-2 1000 metres at the 2019 European Games
- Venue: Zaslavl Regatta Course
- Date: 25–26 June
- Competitors: 32 from 16 nations
- Winning time: 3:40.919

Medalists
gold medal	Cătălin Chirilă; Victor Mihalachi	Romania
silver medal	Andrii Rybachok; Yurii Vandiuk	Ukraine
bronze medal	Ilya Pervukhin; Kirill Shamshurin	Russia

The men's C-2 1000 metres canoe sprint competition at the 2019 European Games in Minsk took place between 25 and 26 June at the Zaslavl Regatta Course.

== Schedule ==
The schedule was as follows:

Date	Time	Round
Tuesday 25 June 2019	10:17	Heats
Tuesday 25 June 2019	16:37	Semifinal
Wednesday 26 June 2019	11:22	Final

All times are Further-eastern European Time (UTC+3)

== Results ==
=== Heats ===
The fastest three boats in each heat advanced directly to the final. The next four fastest boats in each heat, plus the fastest remaining boat advanced to the semifinal.

==== Heat 1 ====
Rank	Canoeists	Country	Time	Notes
1	Yurii Vandiuk; Andrii Rybachok	Ukraine	3:32.436	QF
2	Kirill Shamshurin; Ilya Pervukhin	Russia	3:32.889	QF
3	Yul Oeltze; Peter Kretschmer	Germany	3:32.956	QF
4	Mateusz Kamiński; Michał Kudła	Poland	3:33.001	QS
5	Aivis Tints; Gatis Pranks	Latvia	3:45.466	QS
6	Ilja Davidovskij; Henrikas Žustautas	Lithuania	3:47.764	QS
7	Bruno Afonso; Marco Apura	Portugal	3:53.966	QS
–	Ara Virabyan; Davit Marabyan	Armenia	DSQ	

==== Heat 2 ====
Rank	Canoeists	Country	Time	Notes
1	Cătălin Chirilă; Victor Mihalachi	Romania	3:35.535	QF
2	Daniele Santini; Luca Incollingo	Italy	3:35.539	QF
3	Andrei Bahdanovich; Vitali Asetski	Belarus	3:36.822	QF
4	Noel Domínguez; David Fernández	Spain	3:38.502	QS
5	Petr Fuksa; Martin Fuksa	Czech Republic	3:40.732	QS
6	Balázs Kiss; Bence Dóri	Hungary	3:40.797	QS
7	Loïc Léonard; Thomas Simart	France	3:42.845	QS
8	Ilie Oprea; Oleg Nuţa	Moldova	3:49.392	qS

=== Semifinal ===
The fastest three boats advanced to the final.

Rank	Canoeists	Country	Time	Notes
1	Mateusz Kamiński; Michał Kudła	Poland	3:34.029	QF
2	Petr Fuksa; Martin Fuksa	Czech Republic	3:34.681	QF
3	Balázs Kiss; Bence Dóri	Hungary	3:35.379	QF
4	Bruno Afonso; Marco Apura	Portugal	3:36.639	
5	Aivis Tints; Gatis Pranks	Latvia	3:37.416	
6	Ilie Oprea; Oleg Nuţa	Moldova	3:42.129	
7	Loïc Léonard; Thomas Simart	France	3:43.566	
8	Noel Domínguez; David Fernández	Spain	3:44.426	
9	Ilja Davidovskij; Henrikas Žustautas	Lithuania	3:45.441	

=== Final ===
Competitors in this final raced for positions 1 to 9, with medals going to the top three.

Rank	Canoeists	Country	Time
1st place, gold medalist(s)	Cătălin Chirilă; Victor Mihalachi	Romania	3:40.919
2nd place, silver medalist(s)	Yurii Vandiuk; Andrii Rybachok	Ukraine	3:41.692
3rd place, bronze medalist(s)	Kirill Shamshurin; Ilya Pervukhin	Russia	3:42.547
4	Yul Oeltze; Peter Kretschmer	Germany	3:43.427
5	Mateusz Kamiński; Michał Kudła	Poland	3:43.704
6	Petr Fuksa; Martin Fuksa	Czech Republic	3:46.072
7	Andrei Bahdanovich; Vitali Asetski	Belarus	3:46.762
8	Daniele Santini; Luca Incollingo	Italy	3:46.844
9	Balázs Kiss; Bence Dóri	Hungary	3:48.027
