= 2018 ICF Canoe Sprint World Championships – Men's C-4 500 metres =

Men's C-4 500 metres at the 2018 ICF Canoe Sprint World Championships
- Venue: Centro de Alto Rendimento de Montemor-o-Velho
- Location: Montemor-o-Velho, Portugal
- Dates: 23–25 August
- Competitors: 40 from 10 nations
- Winning time: 1:35.606

Medalists
| gold medal | Pavel Petrov; Viktor Melantyev; Mikhail Pavlov; Ivan Shtyl | Russia |
| silver medal | Yurii Vandiuk; Oleh Borovyk; Andrii Rybachok; Eduard Shemetylo | Ukraine |
| bronze medal | Daniele Santini; Sergiu Craciun; Nicolae Craciun; Luca Incollingo | Italy |

The men's C-4 500 metres competition at the 2018 ICF Canoe Sprint World Championships in Montemor-o-Velho took place at the Centro de Alto Rendimento de Montemor-o-Velho.

== Schedule ==
The schedule was as follows:

| Date | Time | Round |
|---|---|---|
| Thursday 23 August 2018 | 16:20 | Heats |
| Friday 24 August 2018 | 18:24 | Semifinal |
| Saturday 25 August 2018 | 13:18 | Final |

All times are Western European Summer Time (UTC+1)

== Results ==
=== Heats ===
The fastest three boats in each heat advanced directly to the final. The next four fastest boats in each heat, plus the fastest remaining boat advanced to the semifinal.

==== Heat 1 ====
| Rank | Canoeists | Country | Time | Notes |
|---|---|---|---|---|
| 1 | Pavel Petrov; Viktor Melantyev; Mikhail Pavlov; Ivan Shtyl | Russia | 1:38.402 | QF |
| 2 | Tomasz Kaczor; Piotr Kuleta; Tomasz Barniak; Marcin Grzybowski | Poland | 1:39.768 | QF |
| 3 | Noel Domínguez; Mohssine Moutahir; Pablo Graña; David Barreiro | Spain | 1:40.668 | QF |
| 4 | Artsem Kozyr; Hleb Saladukha; Dzmitry Lapata; Dzianis Makhlai | Belarus | 1:40.738 | QS |
| 5 | Pál Sarudi; Balázs Kiss; Tamás Kiss; Mihály Takács | Hungary | 1:40.868 | QS |

==== Heat 2 ====
| Rank | Canoeists | Country | Time | Notes |
|---|---|---|---|---|
| 1 | Daniele Santini; Sergiu Craciun; Nicolae Craciun; Luca Incollingo | Italy | 1:39.122 | QF |
| 2 | Yurii Vandiuk; Oleh Borovyk; Andrii Rybachok; Eduard Shemetylo | Ukraine | 1:39.997 | QF |
| 3 | Moritz Adam; Conrad Scheibner; Michael Müller; Jan Vandrey | Germany | 1:40.897 | QF |
| 4 | Cătălin Chirilă; Gheorghe Stoian; Constantin Diba; Ștefan-Andrei Strat | Romania | 1:41.737 | QS |
| 5 | Ivan Procházka; Daniel Kořínek; Antonín Hrabal; Jan Pocta | Czech Republic | 1:44.662 | QS |

=== Semifinal ===
The fastest three boats advanced to the final.

| Rank | Canoeists | Country | Time | Notes |
|---|---|---|---|---|
| 1 | Pál Sarudi; Balázs Kiss; Tamás Kiss; Mihály Takács | Hungary | 1:36.972 | QF |
| 2 | Cătălin Chirilă; Gheorghe Stoian; Constantin Diba; Ștefan-Andrei Strat | Romania | 1:37.018 | QF |
| 3 | Artsem Kozyr; Hleb Saladukha; Dzmitry Lapata; Dzianis Makhlai | Belarus | 1:37.282 | QF |
| 4 | Ivan Procházka; Daniel Kořínek; Antonín Hrabal; Jan Pocta | Czech Republic | 1:39.715 | |

=== Final ===
Competitors raced for positions 1 to 9, with medals going to the top three.

| Rank | Canoeists | Country | Time |
|---|---|---|---|
| 1st place, gold medalist(s) | Pavel Petrov; Viktor Melantyev; Mikhail Pavlov; Ivan Shtyl | Russia | 1:35.606 |
| 2nd place, silver medalist(s) | Yurii Vandiuk; Oleh Borovyk; Andrii Rybachok; Eduard Shemetylo | Ukraine | 1:36.726 |
| 3rd place, bronze medalist(s) | Daniele Santini; Sergiu Craciun; Nicolae Craciun; Luca Incollingo | Italy | 1:37.196 |
| 4 | Moritz Adam; Conrad Scheibner; Michael Müller; Jan Vandrey | Germany | 1:37.290 |
| 5 | Cătălin Chirilă; Gheorghe Stoian; Constantin Diba; Ștefan-Andrei Strat | Romania | 1:37.700 |
| 6 | Artsem Kozyr; Hleb Saladukha; Dzmitry Lapata; Dzianis Makhlai | Belarus | 1:38.640 |
| 7 | Tomasz Kaczor; Piotr Kuleta; Tomasz Barniak; Marcin Grzybowski | Poland | 1:39.276 |
| 8 | Pál Sarudi; Balázs Kiss; Tamás Kiss; Mihály Takács | Hungary | 1:39.676 |
| – | Noel Domínguez; Mohssine Moutahir; Pablo Graña; David Barreiro | Spain | DSQ |
