= 2017 ICF Canoe Sprint World Championships – Men's C-2 200 metres =

Men's C-2 200 metres at the 2017 ICF Canoe Sprint World Championships
- Venue: Sportcentrum Račice
- Location: Račice, Czech Republic
- Dates: 25–27 August
- Competitors: 32 from 16 nations
- Winning time: 36.088

Medalists
gold medal	Ivan Shtyl; Alexander Kovalenko	Russia
silver medal	Michał Lubniewski; Arsen Śliwiński	Poland
bronze medal	Ádám Fekete; Jonatán Hajdu	Hungary

The men's C-2 200 metres competition at the 2017 ICF Canoe Sprint World Championships in Račice took place at the Sportcentrum Račice.

== Schedule ==
The schedule was as follows:

Date	Time	Round
Friday 25 August 2017	10:43	Heats
Saturday 26 August 2017	16:34	Semifinal
Sunday 27 August 2017	11:09	Final

All times are Central European Summer Time (UTC+2)

== Results ==
=== Heats ===
The fastest three boats in each heat advanced directly to the final. The next four fastest boats in each heat, plus the fastest remaining boat advanced to the semifinal.

==== Heat 1 ====
Rank	Canoeists	Country	Time	Notes
1	Ivan Shtyl; Alexander Kovalenko	Russia	36.338	QF
2	Michał Lubniewski; Arsen Śliwiński	Poland	36.726	QF
3	Ádám Fekete; Jonatán Hajdu	Hungary	37.304	QF
4	Erlon Silva; Maico Ferreira dos Santos	Brazil	37.521	QS
5	Spens Stuber Mehue; Marjuki Marjuki	Indonesia	38.865	QS
6	Vitaliy Vergeles; Denys Kamerylov	Ukraine	39.293	QS
7	Andres Lazo; Vicente González	Ecuador	39.549	QS
8	Gaurav Tomar; Ajit Kumar Sha	India	40.299	

==== Heat 2 ====
Rank	Canoeists	Country	Time	Notes
1	Antoni Segura; Alfonso Benavides	Spain	36.707	QF
2	Merey Medetov; Timur Khaidarov	Kazakhstan	36.834	QF
3	Andrei Bahdanovich; Dzianis Makhlai	Belarus	36.857	QF
4	Sergiu Craciun; Nicolae Craciun	Italy	37.245	QS
5	Adel Mojallali; Ali Ojaghi	Iran	38.373	QS
6	Vytautas Prunskas; Arturas Giliasevicius	Lithuania	38.701	QS
7	Petr Bubanec; Dan Drahokoupil	Czech Republic	39.412	QS
8	Marko Jelkić; Emanuel Horvatiček	Croatia	40.207	qS

=== Semifinal ===
The fastest three boats advanced to the final.

Rank	Canoeists	Country	Time	Notes
1	Sergiu Craciun; Nicolae Craciun	Italy	37.466	QF
2	Erlon Silva; Maico Ferreira dos Santos	Brazil	38.283	QF
3	Vitaliy Vergeles; Denys Kamerylov	Ukraine	38.372	QF
4	Petr Bubanec; Dan Drahokoupil	Czech Republic	38.483	
5	Spens Stuber Mehue; Marjuki Marjuki	Indonesia	38.722	
6	Andres Lazo; Vicente González	Ecuador	39.077	
7	Vytautas Prunskas; Arturas Giliasevicius	Lithuania	39.872	
8	Marko Jelkić; Emanuel Horvatiček	Croatia	40.777	
9	Adel Mojallali; Ali Ojaghi	Iran	41.350	

=== Final ===
Competitors raced for positions 1 to 9, with medals going to the top three.

Rank	Canoeists	Country	Time
1st place, gold medalist(s)	Ivan Shtyl; Alexander Kovalenko	Russia	36.088
2nd place, silver medalist(s)	Michał Lubniewski; Arsen Śliwiński	Poland	36.673
3rd place, bronze medalist(s)	Ádám Fekete; Jonatán Hajdu	Hungary	36.762
4	Andrei Bahdanovich; Dzianis Makhlai	Belarus	36.894
5	Antoni Segura; Alfonso Benavides	Spain	36.962
6	Sergiu Craciun; Nicolae Craciun	Italy	37.467
7	Merey Medetov; Timur Khaidarov	Kazakhstan	37.657
8	Erlon Silva; Maico Ferreira dos Santos	Brazil	38.246
9	Vitaliy Vergeles; Denys Kamerylov	Ukraine	38.773
