= 2018 Canoe Sprint European Championships =

International canoeing and kayaking event

- Venue: Ada Ciganlija regatta venue
- Location: Belgrade, Serbia
- Start date: 8 June
- End date: 10 June
- Competitors: 567 from 40 nations

The 2018 Canoe Sprint European Championships was the 30th edition of the Canoe Sprint European Championships, an international sprint canoe/kayak and paracanoe event organised by the European Canoe Association, and was held in Belgrade, Serbia, between 8 and 10 June.

== Canoe sprint ==
=== Medal table ===
Rank	Nation	Gold	Silver	Bronze	Total
1	Hungary	6	5	4	15
2	Germany	4	5	2	11
3	Russia	3	5	4	12
4	Belarus	3	5	1	9
5	Spain	3	1	3	7
6	Czech Republic	3	0	0	3
7	Poland	2	1	4	7
8	Portugal	2	1	1	4
9	Serbia	1	1	1	3
10	France	1	1	0	2
10	Romania	1	1	0	2
12	Georgia	1	0	0	1
13	Ukraine	0	2	3	5
14	Lithuania	0	1	0	1
14	Slovakia	0	1	0	1
16	Belgium	0	0	2	2
16	Italy	0	0	2	2
18	Denmark	0	0	1	1
18	Moldova	0	0	1	1
18	Norway	0	0	1	1
18	Sweden	0	0	1	1
Totals (21 entries)		30	30	31	91

=== Men ===
Event	Gold	Time	Silver	Time	Bronze	Time
C-1 200 m	Zaza Nadiradze (GEO)	39.200	Ivan Shtyl (RUS)	39.224	Artsem Kozyr (BLR)	39.468
C-1 500 m	Martin Fuksa (CZE)	1:47.404	Sebastian Brendel (GER)	1:47.659	Oleg Tarnovschi (MDA)	1:48.454
C-1 1000 m	Martin Fuksa (CZE)	3:46.723	Sebastian Brendel (GER)	3:46.810	Carlo Tacchini (ITA)	3:51.916
C-1 5000 m	Sebastian Brendel (GER)	22:51.010	Kirill Shamshurin (RUS)	23:06.650	Carlo Tacchini (ITA)	23:11.350
C-2 200 m	Russia; Aleksandr Kovalenko; Ivan Shtyl	35.919	Belarus; Hleb Saladukha; Dzianis Makhlai	36.139	Poland; Arsen Śliwiński; Michał Łubniewski	36.475
C-2 500 m	Romania; Leonid Carp; Victor Mihalachi	1:38.165	Russia; Pavel Petrov; Mikhail Pavlov	1:38.945	Ukraine; Dmytro Ianchuk; Taras Mishchuk	1:38.985
C-2 1000 m	Germany; Yul Oeltze; Peter Kretschmer	3:25.041	Romania; Leonid Carp; Victor Mihalachi	3:25.481	Spain; Sergio Vallejo; Adrián Sieiro	3:27.414
C-4 500 m	Russia; Pavel Petrov; Viktor Melantyev; Mikhail Pavlov; Ivan Shtyl	1:29.155	Ukraine; Yurii Vandiuk; Oleh Borovyk; Andrii Rybachok; Oleksandr Sivkov	1:30.941	Poland; Wiktor Głazunow; Michał Łubniewski; Arsen Śliwiński; Marcin Grzybowski	1:31.008
K-1 200 m	Carlos Garrote (ESP)	34.655	Artūras Seja (LTU)	34.783	Marko Dragosavljević (SRB)	34.801
K-1 500 m	Josef Dostál (CZE)	1:36.398	Oleh Kukharyk (UKR)	1:37.333	Fernando Pimenta (POR)	1:37.393
K-1 1000 m	Fernando Pimenta (POR)	3:29.200	Bálint Kopasz (HUN)	3:29.480	Max Rendschmidt (GER)	3:31.520
K-1 5000 m	Max Hoff (GER)	20:27.960	Fernando Pimenta (POR)	20:38.790	Eivind Vold (NOR)	20:50.610
K-2 200 m	Spain; Saúl Craviotto; Cristian Toro	31.250	Serbia; Nebojša Grujić; Marko Novaković	31.388	Hungary; Márk Balaska; Balázs Birkás	31.600
K-2 500 m	Hungary; Milán Mozgi; Tamás Somorácz	1:27.500	Spain; Marcus Walz; Rodrigo Germade	1:27.630	Russia; Yury Postrigay; Vasily Pogreban	1:27.630
K-2 1000 m	Serbia; Marko Tomićević; Milenko Zorić	3:04.940 WB	Germany; Max Hoff; Marcus Gross	3:06.206	Spain; Francisco Cubelos; Íñigo Peña	3:06.750
K-4 500 m	Spain; Saúl Craviotto; Marcus Walz; Cristian Toro; Rodrigo Germade	1:18.559	Germany; Max Rendschmidt; Tom Liebscher; Ronald Rauhe; Max Lemke	1:18.573	Hungary; Sándor Tótka; Miklós Dudás; Péter Molnár; István Kuli	1:19.939
K-4 1000 m	Belarus; Kiryl Nikitsin; Vitaliy Bialko; Ilya Fedarenka; Raman Piatrushenka	2:48.841	Slovakia; Samuel Baláž; Gábor Jakubík; Milan Frana; Tibor Linka	2:49.491	Spain; Javier Hernanz; Aitor Gorrotxategi; Pelayo Roza; Ruben Millan	2:49.701

=== Women ===
Event	Gold	Time	Silver	Time	Bronze	Time
C-1 200 m	Olesia Romasenko (RUS)	45.726	Dorota Borowska (POL)	46.222	Virág Balla (HUN)	46.470
C-1 500 m	Alena Nazdrova (BLR)	2:03.053	Kseniia Kurach (RUS)	2:05.013	Liudmyla Luzan (UKR)	2:07.173
C-1 5000 m	Volha Klimava (BLR)	25:58.260	Zsanett Lakatos (HUN)	26:49.770	Liudmyla Babak (UKR)	27:02.130
C-2 200 m	Hungary; Virág Balla; Kincső Takács	42.730	Belarus; Alena Nazdrova; Kamila Bobr	43.247	Russia; Irina Andreeva; Olesia Romasenko	43.374
C-2 500 m	Hungary; Virág Balla; Kincső Takács	1:55.678	Belarus; Nadzeya Makarchanka; Volha Klimava	1:56.238	Russia; Irina Andreeva; Olesia Romasenko	1:56.987
K-1 200 m	Marta Walczykiewicz (POL)	39.697	Danuta Kozák (HUN)	40.023	Emma Jørgensen (DEN)	40.199
K-1 500 m	Danuta Kozák (HUN)	1:47.742	Volha Khudzenka (BLR)	1:48.762	Anna Puławska (POL)	1:50.518
K-1 1000 m	Nina Krankemann (GER)	3:57.229	Tamara Takács (HUN)	3:57.355	Karin Johansson (SWE)	4:02.645
K-1 5000 m	Tamara Takács (HUN)	22:58.560	Sarah Troël (FRA)	23:27.440	Hermien Peters (BEL)	23:31.700
K-2 200 m	Portugal; Teresa Portela; Joana Vasconcelos	37.055	Russia; Natalia Podolskaya; Vera Sobetova	37.083	Poland; Dominika Włodarczyk; Katarzyna Kołodziejczyk	37.147
K-2 500 m	France; Manon Hostens; Sarah Guyot	1:39.257	Hungary; Erika Medveczky; Tamara Csipes	1:39.447	Belgium; Hermien Peters; Lize Broekx Germany; Jasmin Fritz; Steffi Kriegerstein	1:40.412
K-2 1000 m	Poland; Justyna Iskrzycka; Paulina Paszek	3:31.645	Germany; Sarah Brüßler; Melanie Gebhardt	3:31.915	Hungary; Noémi Pupp; Tamara Csipes	3:36.271
K-4 500 m	Hungary; Anna Kárász; Erika Medveczky; Danuta Kozák; Dóra Bodonyi	1:28.933	Belarus; Alina Svita; Nadzeya Liapeshka; Maryna Litvinchuk; Volha Khudzenka	1:30.067	Russia; Kira Stepanova; Vera Sobetova; Svetlana Chernigovskaya; Anastasia Panchenko	1:30.553

== Paracanoe ==
=== Medal table ===
Rank	Nation	Gold	Silver	Bronze	Total
1	Great Britain (GBR)	4	3	1	8
2	Italy (ITA)	2	0	0	2
3	Russia (RUS)	1	3	3	7
4	Ukraine (UKR)	1	1	1	3
5	Austria (AUT)	1	0	0	1
5	Sweden (SWE)	1	0	0	1
7	Poland (POL)	0	1	2	3
8	Hungary (HUN)	0	1	1	2
9	Romania (ROU)	0	1	0	1
10	France (FRA)	0	0	1	1
10	Germany (GER)	0	0	1	1
Totals (11 entries)		10	10	10	30

=== Medal events ===
Non-Paralympic classes

Event	Gold		Silver		Bronze	
Men's KL1	Esteban Farias; Italy	47.658	Róbert Suba; Hungary	48.278	Rémy Boullé; France	48.278
Men's KL2	Marcus Swoboda; Austria	42.906	Nick Beighton; Great Britain	43.326	Mykola Syniuk; Ukraine	43.336
Men's KL3	Serhii Yemelianov; Ukraine	39.595	Leonid Krylov; Russia	40.140	Artem Voronkov; Russia	40.320
Men's VL1	No entries					
Men's VL2	Marius-Bogdan Ciustea; Italy	54.513	Roman Serebryakov; Russia	56.126	Tamás Juhász; Hungary	58.223
Men's VL3	David Phillipson; Great Britain	50.018	Tomasz Moździerski; Poland	51.334	Jack Eyers; Great Britain	51.651
Women's KL1	Jeanette Chippington; Great Britain	56.631	Alexandra Dupik; Russia	56.981	Kamila Kubas; Poland	57.531
Women's KL2	Emma Wiggs; Great Britain	48.568	Charlotte Henshaw; Great Britain	49.002	Nadezda Andreeva; Russia	53.957
Women's KL3	Helene Ripa; Sweden	51.027	Mihaela Lulea; Romania	52.972	Katarzyna Sobczak; Poland	53.112
Women's VL1	No entries					
Women's VL2	Emma Wiggs; Great Britain	57.903	Jeanette Chippington; Great Britain	1:00.516	Maria Nikiforova; Russia	1:01.242
Women's VL3	Larisa Volik; Russia	1:00.430	Nataliia Lagutenko; Ukraine	1:03.553	Anja Adler; Germany	1:05.786
