= 2019 ICF Canoe Sprint World Championships – Men's C-2 200 metres =

Men's C-2 200 metres at the 2019 ICF Canoe Sprint World Championships
- Venue: Olympic Centre of Szeged
- Location: Szeged, Hungary
- Dates: 21–23 August
- Competitors: 44 from 22 nations
- Winning time: 36.06

Medalists
gold medal	Alberto Pedrero; Pablo Graña	Spain
silver medal	Michał Lubniewski; Arsen Śliwiński	Poland
bronze medal	Artur Guliev; Elyorjon Mamadaliev	Uzbekistan

The men's C-2 200 metres competition at the 2019 ICF Canoe Sprint World Championships in Szeged took place at the Olympic Centre of Szeged.

== Schedule ==
The schedule was as follows:

Date	Time	Round
Wednesday 21 August 2019	10:10	Heats
Wednesday 21 August 2019	15:05	Semifinals
Friday 23 August 2019	14:30	Final B
Friday 23 August 2019	15:10	Final A

All times are Central European Summer Time (UTC+2)

== Results ==
=== Heats ===
Heat winners advanced directly to the A final.
The next six fastest boats in each heat advanced to the semifinals.

==== Heat 1 ====
Rank	Canoeists	Country	Time	Notes
1	Michał Lubniewski; Arsen Śliwiński	Poland	37.21	QA
2	Marko Jelkić; Petar Ivić	Croatia	38.80	QS
3	Vitalii Goliuk; Volodymyr Trotsiuk	Ukraine	38.89	QS
4	Ilie Sprincean; Ilie Oprea	Moldova	39.36	QS
5	Wang Longkui; Xu Jiabin	China	39.50	QS
6	Gaurav Tomar; Sunil Singh Salam	India	41.30	QS
7	Ryan Grady; Jonathan Grady	United States	43.81	QS
–	Ali Dherar Kadhim Aldain; Tareq Sameer Al-Gburi	Iraq	DNS	

==== Heat 2 ====
Rank	Canoeists	Country	Time	Notes
1	Merey Medetov; Timur Khaidarov	Kazakhstan	36.76	QA
2	Hleb Saladukha; Dzianis Makhlai	Belarus	36.90	QS
3	Constantin Diba; Gheorghe Stoian	Romania	39.14	QS
4	Chun Leng Tan; Lucas Zhi Kai Huan	Singapore	40.57	QS
5	Mussa Chamaune; Nordino Mussa	Mozambique	42.94	QS
6	Manuel Antonio; Benilson Sanda	Angola	44.93	QS
7	Nadir Boukhari-Sardi; Hadj-Khlifa Dernani	Algeria	45.80	QS

==== Heat 3 ====
Rank	Canoeists	Country	Time	Notes
1	Alberto Pedrero; Pablo Graña	Spain	36.35	QA
2	Ivan Shtyl; Alexander Kovalenko	Russia	37.03	QS
3	Artur Guliev; Elyorjon Mamadaliev	Uzbekistan	37.04	QS
4	Dávid Korisánszky; Róbert Mike	Hungary	38.42	QS
5	Kryštof Hájek; Daniel Kořínek	Czech Republic	40.75	QS
6	Buly Da Conceição Triste; Roque Fernandes Dos Ramos	São Tomé and Príncipe	43.77	QS
–	Hermie Macarana; Ojay Fuentes	Philippines	DNS	

=== Semifinals ===
Qualification was as follows:

The fastest three boats in each semi advanced to the A final.
The next four fastest boats in each semi, plus the fastest remaining boat advanced to the B final.

==== Semifinal 1 ====
Rank	Canoeists	Country	Time	Notes
1	Artur Guliev; Elyorjon Mamadaliev	Uzbekistan	36.11	QA
2	Dávid Korisánszky; Róbert Mike	Hungary	36.96	QA
3	Marko Jelkić; Petar Ivić	Croatia	37.67	QA
4	Constantin Diba; Gheorghe Stoian	Romania	38.07	QB
5	Ilie Sprincean; Ilie Oprea	Moldova	38.89	QB
6	Gaurav Tomar; Sunil Singh Salam	India	38.98	QB
7	Mussa Chamaune; Nordino Mussa	Mozambique	41.03	QB
8	Buly Da Conceição Triste; Roque Fernandes Dos Ramos	São Tomé and Príncipe	42.22	qB
9	Nadir Boukhari-Sardi; Hadj-Khlifa Dernani	Algeria	44.63	

==== Semifinal 2 ====
Rank	Canoeists	Country	Time	Notes
1	Ivan Shtyl; Alexander Kovalenko	Russia	35.85	QA
2	Hleb Saladukha; Dzianis Makhlai	Belarus	36.77	QA
3	Wang Longkui; Xu Jiabin	China	36.99	QA
4	Vitalii Goliuk; Volodymyr Trotsiuk	Ukraine	37.86	QB
5	Kryštof Hájek; Daniel Kořínek	Czech Republic	39.11	QB
6	Chun Leng Tan; Lucas Zhi Kai Huan	Singapore	40.48	QB
7	Ryan Grady; Jonathan Grady	United States	42.52	QB
8	Manuel Antonio; Benilson Sanda	Angola	42.67	

=== Finals ===
==== Final B ====
Competitors in this final raced for positions 10 to 18.

Rank	Canoeists	Country	Time
1	Vitalii Goliuk; Volodymyr Trotsiuk	Ukraine	36.88
2	Constantin Diba; Gheorghe Stoian	Romania	37.01
3	Ilie Sprincean; Ilie Oprea	Moldova	37.17
4	Kryštof Hájek; Daniel Kořínek	Czech Republic	37.86
5	Gaurav Tomar; Sunil Singh Salam	India	38.21
6	Mussa Chamaune; Nordino Mussa	Mozambique	39.17
7	Chun Leng Tan; Lucas Zhi Kai Huan	Singapore	39.37
8	Buly Da Conceição Triste; Roque Fernandes Dos Ramos	São Tomé and Príncipe	41.39
9	Ryan Grady; Jonathan Grady	United States	41.43

==== Final A ====
Competitors raced for positions 1 to 9, with medals going to the top three.

Rank	Canoeists	Country	Time
1st place, gold medalist(s)	Alberto Pedrero; Pablo Graña	Spain	36.06
2nd place, silver medalist(s)	Michał Lubniewski; Arsen Śliwiński	Poland	36.18
3rd place, bronze medalist(s)	Artur Guliev; Elyorjon Mamadaliev	Uzbekistan	36.42
4	Hleb Saladukha; Dzianis Makhlai	Belarus	36.61
5	Merey Medetov; Timur Khaidarov	Kazakhstan	36.73
6	Ivan Shtyl; Alexander Kovalenko	Russia	37.75
7	Marko Jelkić; Petar Ivić	Croatia	37.84
8	Dávid Korisánszky; Róbert Mike	Hungary	38.21
9	Wang Longkui; Xu Jiabin	China	38.40
