= Rybachok =

Rybachok (Ukrainian: Рибачок) is a Ukrainian surname. Notable people with the surname include:

- Anastasiia Rybachok
- Andrii Rybachok
