= 2021 ICF Canoe Sprint World Championships – Men's C-4 500 metres =

Men's C-4 500 metres at the 2021 ICF Canoe Sprint World Championships
- Venue: Lake Bagsværd
- Location: Copenhagen, Denmark
- Dates: 18 September
- Competitors: 28 from 7 nations
- Winning time: 1:31.20

Medalists
gold medal	Vitaliy Vergeles; Andrii Rybachok; Yurii Vandiuk; Taras Mishchuk	Ukraine
silver medal	Aleksander Kitewski; Arsen Śliwiński; Michał Łubniewski; Norman Zezula	Poland
bronze medal	Pavel Petrov; Mikhail Pavlov; Viktor Melantyev; Ivan Shtyl	International Olympic Committee

The men's C-4 500 metres competition at the 2021 ICF Canoe Sprint World Championships in Copenhagen took place on Lake Bagsværd.

== Schedule ==
The schedule was as follows:

Date	Time	Round
Saturday 18 September 2021	12:48	Final

All times are Central European Summer Time (UTC+2)

== Results ==
With fewer than ten boats entered, this event was held as a direct final.

Rank	Canoeists	Country	Time
1st place, gold medalist(s)	Vitaliy Vergeles; Andrii Rybachok; Yurii Vandiuk; Taras Mishchuk	Ukraine	1:31.20
2nd place, silver medalist(s)	Aleksander Kitewski; Arsen Śliwiński; Michał Łubniewski; Norman Zezula	Poland	1:31.31
3rd place, bronze medalist(s)	Pavel Petrov; Mikhail Pavlov; Viktor Melantyev; Ivan Shtyl	RCF	1:31.55
4	Joan Moreno; Pablo Martínez; Cayetano García; Adrián Sieiro	Spain	1:32.02
5	Mikita Rudzevich; Vitali Asetski; Maksim Krysko; Dzianis Makhlai	Belarus	1:33.26
6	Jiří Minařík; Filip Dvořák; Antonín Hrabal; Jiří Zalubil	Czech Republic	1:33.51
7	Kristóf Kollár; Dominik Zombori; Dávid Korisánszky; Dávid Hodován	Hungary	1:33.92
