= Sivkov =

Sivkov (masculine, Russian: Сивков) or Sivkova (feminine, Russian: Сивкова) is a Russian surname. Notable people with the surname include:

- Anatoly Sivkov (born 1952), Russian painter
- Anna Sivkova (born 1982), Russian fencer
- Grigory Sivkov
- Kristina Sivkova
- Oleksandr Sivkov
