= Saladukha =

Saladukha is a surname. Notable people with the surname include:

- Hleb Saladukha (born 1994), Belarusian sprint canoeist
- Olha Saladuha (born 1983), Ukrainian triple jumper
