= Canoe sprint at the 2019 European Games – Qualification =

There will be a total of 350 athlete quota places available for canoe sprint at the 2019 European Games; 175 each for men and women.

The sole qualification event was the 2018 Canoe Sprint European Championships in Belgrade between 8 and 10 June 2018.

== Qualification rules ==
Each National Olympic Committee (NOC) is restricted to one boat per event, which equates to a maximum quota of sixteen boats (ergo a maximum quota of 27 qualified athletes). Quota places were awarded to NOCs rather than individual athletes (unless stated otherwise) as follows:

- Host NOC: Belarus was guaranteed a minimum quota of four boats - C-1 1000m and K-1 1000m for men; C-1 200m and K-1 500m for women.
- European Championships: The bulk of quota places were awarded by virtue of performances at the qualification event. Each event had its own quota as listed in the qualification system.
- Universality (1): NOCs that failed to earn any men's or women's quota places in the qualification event were entitled to a single athlete-specific quota place in the men's C-1 1000m or women's C-1 200m respectively, provided their athlete contested those events at the qualification event. Two places per event were available for this purpose.
- Universality (2): A single boat quota place in the men's C-2 1000m and women's C-2 500m was awarded by the Tripartite Commission.
- Reallocation: Unused quota spots were reallocated. In practice, this was used where some of an NOC's competitors in a larger boat category also competed in a smaller category, freeing up the athlete quota spot that NOC had earned in the smaller category.

Athletes that qualify and are selected by their NOC can participate in as many canoe sprint events as they wish (including the event they qualified in) as long as no other athlete/boat from their NOC is in their event(s) of choice.
