= Canoeing at the 2016 Summer Olympics – Men's C-2 1000 metres =

Men's canoe sprint C-2 1000 metres at the Games of the XXXI Olympiad
- Venue: Lagoa Stadium
- Date: 19–20 August 2016
- Competitors: 22 from 11 nations
- Winning time: 3:43.912

Medalists
1st place, gold medalist(s)		Sebastian Brendel; Jan Vandrey	Germany
2nd place, silver medalist(s)		Erlon Silva; Isaquias Queiroz	Brazil
3rd place, bronze medalist(s)		Dmytro Ianchuk; Taras Mishchuk	Ukraine

The men's canoe sprint C-2 1,000 metres at the 2016 Olympic Games in Rio de Janeiro took place between 19 and 20 August at Lagoa Stadium. The medals were presented by Bernard Rajzman, IOC member, Brazil and Jens Perlwitz, Board Member of the ICF.

== Competition format ==
The competition comprised heats, semifinals, and a final round.

== Schedule ==
All times are Brasilia Time (UTC-03:00)

Date	Time	Round
Friday, 19 August 2016	9:21; 10:21	Heats; Semifinals
Saturday, 20 August 2016	9:14	Finals

== Results ==
=== Heats ===
==== Heat 1 ====
Rank	Canoer	Country	Time	Notes
1	Erlon Silva; Isaquias Queiroz	Brazil	3:33.269	FA
2	Dmytro Ianchuk; Taras Mishchuk	Ukraine	3:35.284	SF
3	Ilya Shtokalov; Ilya Pervukhin	Russia	3:43.105	SF
4	Martin Marinov; Ferenc Szekszárdi	Australia	4:07.372	SF
5	Mussa Chamaune; Joaquim Lobo	Mozambique	4:14.002	SF

==== Heat 2 ====
Rank	Canoer	Country	Time	Notes
1	Sebastian Brendel; Jan Vandrey	Germany	3:33.482	FA
2	Jorge Dayán; Serguey Torres	Cuba	3:34.939	SF
3	Róbert Mike; Henrik Vasbányai	Hungary	3:35.501	SF
4	Filip Dvořák; Jaroslav Radoň	Czech Republic	3:36.818	SF
5	Mateusz Kamiński; Michał Kudła	Poland	3:44.717	SF
6	Gerasim Kochnev; Serik Mirbekov	Uzbekistan	4:00.330	SF

=== Semifinals ===
==== Semifinal 1 ====
Rank	Canoer	Country	Time	Notes
1	Dmytro Ianchuk; Taras Mishchuk	Ukraine	3:38.384	FA
2	Filip Dvořák; Jaroslav Radoň	Czech Republic	3:42.166	FA
3	Róbert Mike; Henrik Vasbányai	Hungary	3:56.126	FA
4	Mussa Chamaune; Joaquim Lobo	Mozambique	4:23.965	FB

==== Semifinal 2 ====
Rank	Canoer	Country	Time	Notes
1	Jorge Dayán; Serguey Torres	Cuba	3:40.192	FA
2	Gerasim Kochnev; Serik Mirbekov	Uzbekistan	3:40.772	FA
3	Ilya Shtokalov; Ilya Pervukhin	Russia	3:42.127	FA
4	Mateusz Kamiński; Michał Kudła	Poland	3:43.467	FB
5	Martin Marinov; Ferenc Szekszárdi	Australia	4:13.754	FB

=== Finals ===
==== Final B ====
Rank	Canoer	Country	Time	Notes
1	Mateusz Kamiński; Michał Kudła	Poland	3:52.964	
2	Martin Marinov; Ferenc Szekszárdi	Australia	4:10.238	
3	Mussa Chamaune; Joaquim Lobo	Mozambique	4:38.732	

==== Final A ====
Rank	Canoer	Country	Time	Notes
1st place, gold medalist(s)	Sebastian Brendel; Jan Vandrey	Germany	3:43.912	
2nd place, silver medalist(s)	Erlon Silva; Isaquias Queiroz	Brazil	3:44.819	
3rd place, bronze medalist(s)	Dmytro Ianchuk; Taras Mishchuk	Ukraine	3:45.949	
4	Róbert Mike; Henrik Vasbányai	Hungary	3:46.198	
5	Ilya Shtokalov; Ilya Pervukhin	Russia	3:46.776	
6	Jorge Dayán; Serguey Torres	Cuba	3:48.133	
7	Filip Dvořák; Jaroslav Radoň	Czech Republic	3:49.352	
8	Gerasim Kochnev; Serik Mirbekov	Uzbekistan	3:52.920	
