= Fernando Jorge (canoeist) =

Cuban canoeist

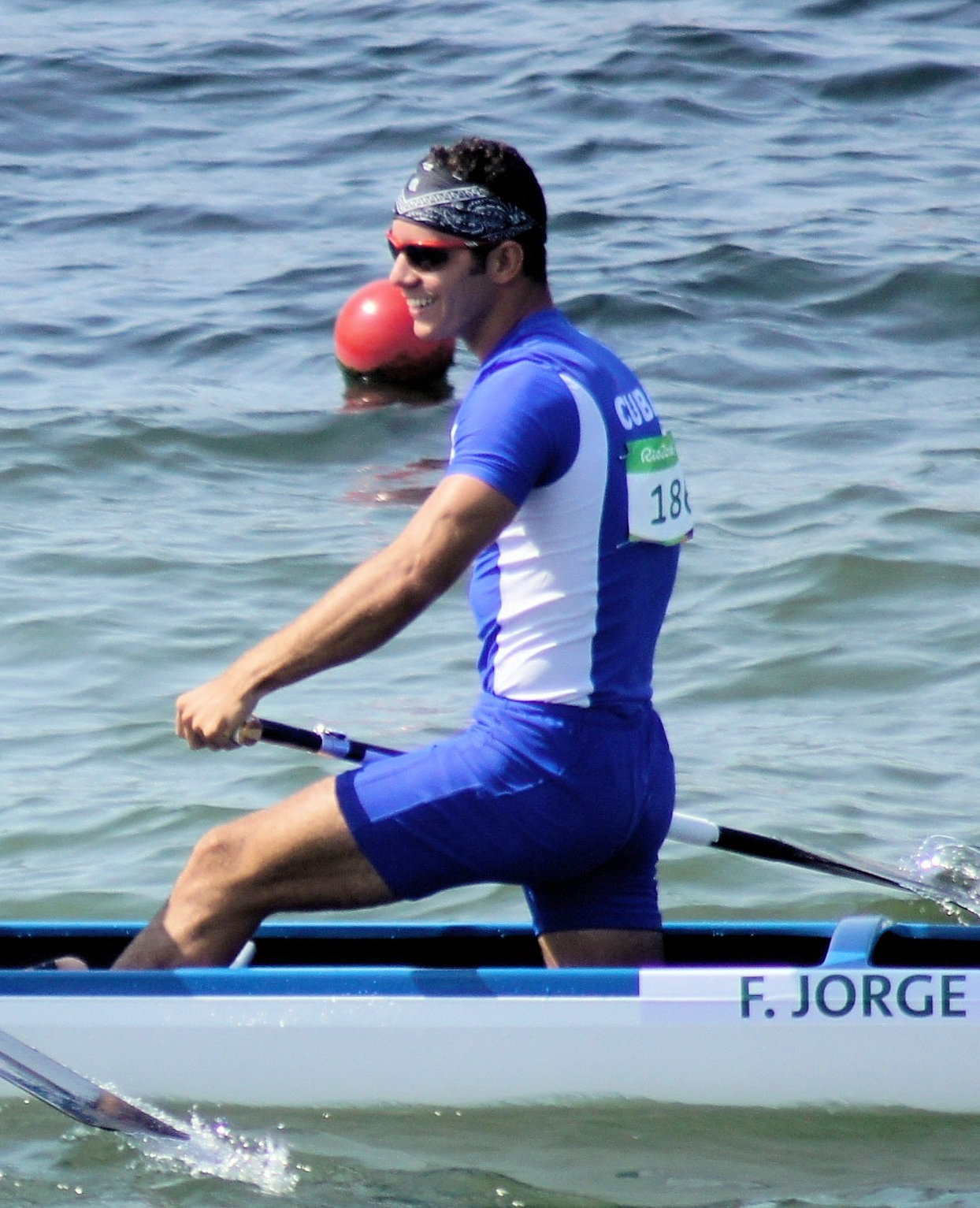
- Jorge at the 2016 Summer Olympics

Personal information
- Full name: Fernando Dayan Jorge Enriquez
- Born: 3 December 1998 (age 27) Cienfuegos, Cuba
- Height: 173 cm (5 ft 8 in)
- Weight: 70 kg (154 lb)

Sport
- Country: Cuba
- Sport: Canoe sprint
- Club: Equipo Nacional
Medal record
Men's canoe sprint
Representing Cuba
Olympic Games
Gold medal – first place	2020 Tokyo	C-2 1000 m
World Championships
Silver medal – second place	2017 Račice	C-2 1000 m
Silver medal – second place	2018 Montemor-o-Velho	C-1 5000 m
Silver medal – second place	2018 Montemor-o-Velho	C-2 1000 m
Silver medal – second place	2019 Szeged	C-2 1000 m
Bronze medal – third place	2019 Szeged	C-1 5000 m
Bronze medal – third place	2021 Copenhagen	C-2 1000 m
Pan American Games
Gold medal – first place	2019 Lima	C-2 1000 m
Silver medal – second place	2019 Lima	C-1 1000 m

Fernando Dayan Jorge Enriquez (born 3 December 1998) is a Cuban sprint canoeist. He took up canoeing in late 2015 and won the 2016 Pan American Championships with Serguey Torres in the C-2 1000 m event . They finished sixth at the 2016 Olympics. He also competed in the Tokyo 2020 Olympic Games and won a gold medal in the Men's C-2 1000 metres event.

In 2022, Jorge defected from Cuba while he was traveling in Mexico. He competed as a refugee athlete representing the Refugee Olympic Team in the 2024 Summer Olympics.
