= Pavel Petrov =

Russian canoeist

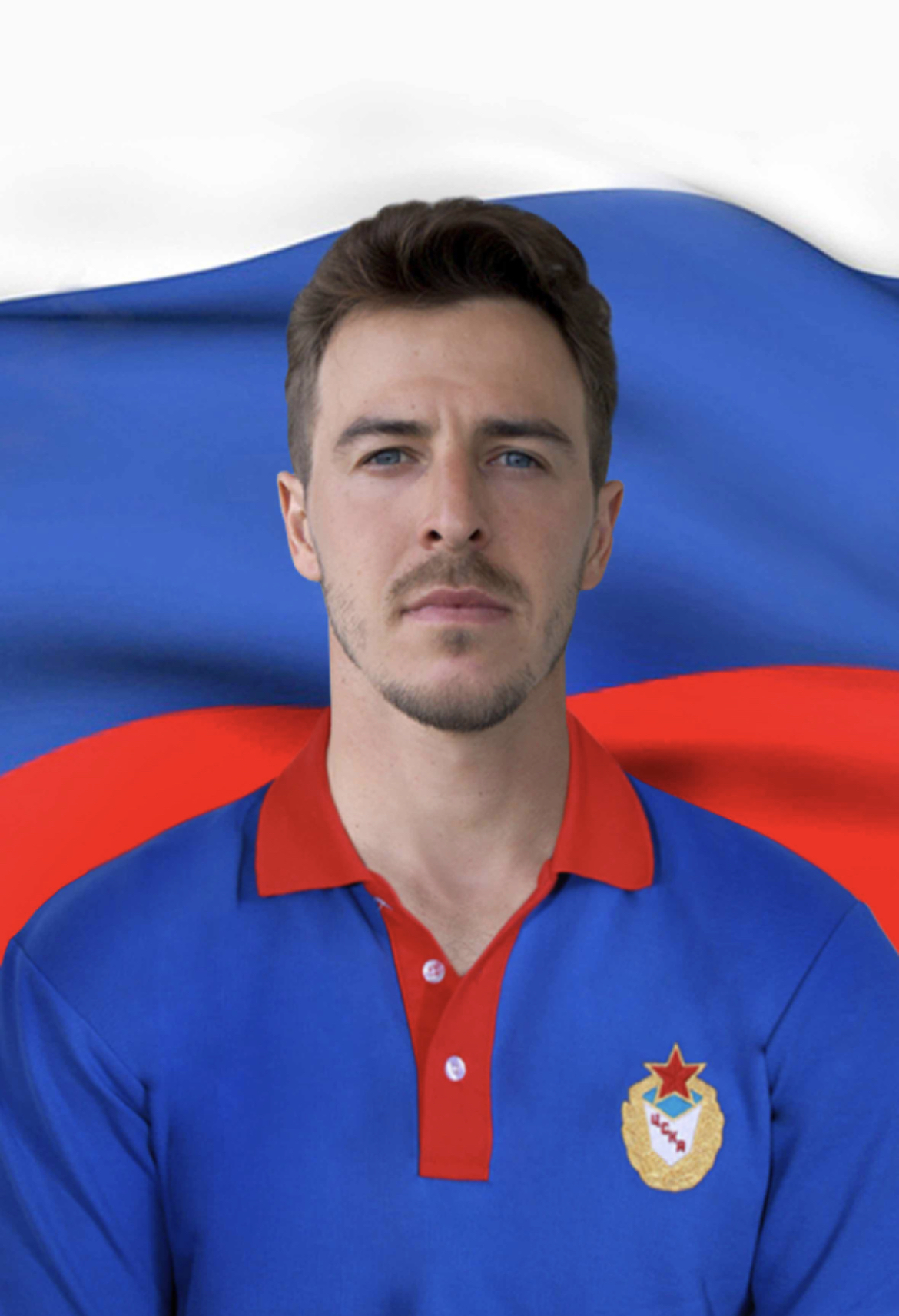

Personal information
- Nationality: Russian
- Born: 20 March 1987 (age 39) Leninabad, Tajik SSR, Soviet Union
- Height: 1.78 m (5 ft 10 in)
- Weight: 80 kg (176 lb)

Sport
- Country: Russia
- Sport: Canoe sprint
Medal record
Men's canoe sprint
Representing Russia
World Championships
Gold medal – first place	2015 Milan	C–2 500 m
Gold medal – first place	2018 Montemor-o-Velho	C-4 500 m
Gold medal – first place	2019 Szeged	C-4 500 m
Bronze medal – third place	2010 Poznań	C-2 500 m
Bronze medal – third place	2014 Moscow	C-1 5000 m
Bronze medal – third place	2021 Copenhagen	C-4 500 m
European Championships
Gold medal – first place	2010 Trasona	C-4 1000 m
Gold medal – first place	2018 Belgrade	C-4 500 m
Silver medal – second place	2015 Račice	C-1 5000 m
Silver medal – second place	2018 Belgrade	C-2 500 m
Bronze medal – third place	2014 Brandenburg	C-1 5000 m
Universiade
Gold medal – first place	2013 Kazan	C-4 500 m
Silver medal – second place	2013 Kazan	C-4 1000 m

Pavel Pavlovich Petrov (Russian: Павел Павлович Петров; born 20 March 1987) is a Russian sprint canoeist who has competed since the late 2000s. He won a bronze medal in the C-2 500 m event at the 2010 ICF Canoe Sprint World Championships in Poznań.
