= 2018 ICF Canoe Sprint World Championships – Men's C-2 200 metres =

Men's C-2 200 metres at the 2018 ICF Canoe Sprint World Championships
- Venue: Centro de Alto Rendimento de Montemor-o-Velho
- Location: Montemor-o-Velho, Portugal
- Dates: 24 August
- Competitors: 18 from 9 nations
- Winning time: 37.646

Medalists
gold medal	Hleb Saladukha; Dzianis Makhlai	Belarus
silver medal	Arsen Śliwiński; Michał Lubniewski	Poland
bronze medal	Alexander Kovalenko; Ivan Shtyl	Russia

The men's C-2 200 metres competition at the 2018 ICF Canoe Sprint World Championships in Montemor-o-Velho took place at the Centro de Alto Rendimento de Montemor-o-Velho.

== Schedule ==
The schedule was as follows:

Date	Time	Round
Friday 24 August 2018	16:10	Final

All times are Western European Summer Time (UTC+1)

== Results ==
With fewer than ten competitors entered, this event was held as a direct final.

Rank	Canoeists	Country	Time
1st place, gold medalist(s)	Hleb Saladukha; Dzianis Makhlai	Belarus	37.646
2nd place, silver medalist(s)	Arsen Śliwiński; Michał Lubniewski	Poland	37.816
3rd place, bronze medalist(s)	Alexander Kovalenko; Ivan Shtyl	Russia	37.993
4	Antoni Segura; Alfonso Benavides	Spain	38.396
5	Jonatán Hajdu; Ádám Fekete	Hungary	39.026
6	Vitaliy Vergeles; Denys Kamerylov	Ukraine	39.130
7	Gheorghe Stoian; Constantin Diba	Romania	41.323
8	Aoto Yabu; Masato Hashimoto	Japan	42.093
9	Mussa Chamaune; Nordino Mussa	Mozambique	47.617
