= Mikhail Pavlov (canoeist) =

Russian canoeist

Personal information
- Nationality: Russian
- Born: 12 January 1986 (age 40) Belaya Kalitva, Russian SSR, Soviet Union
- Height: 1.72 m (5 ft 8 in)
- Weight: 86 kg (190 lb)

Sport
- Country: Russia
- Sport: Canoe sprint
Medal record
Men's canoe sprint
Representing Russia
World Championships
Gold medal – first place	2010 Poznań	C-1 4 x 200 m
Gold medal – first place	2015 Milan	C–2 500 m
Gold medal – first place	2018 Montemor-o-Velho	C-4 500 m
Gold medal – first place	2019 Szeged	C-4 500 m
Bronze medal – third place	2021 Copenhagen	C-4 500 m
European Championships
Gold medal – first place	2018 Belgrade	C-4 500 m
Silver medal – second place	2015 Račice	C–1 500 m
Silver medal – second place	2016 Moscow	C–1 500 m
Silver medal – second place	2018 Belgrade	C-2 500 m
Bronze medal – third place	2008 Milan	C–4 500 m
Universiade
Gold medal – first place	2013 Kazan	C-4 500 m

Mikhail Sergeyevich Pavlov (Russian: Михаил Сергеевич Павлов; born 1 December 1986) is a Russian sprint canoeist who has competed since the late 2000s. He won a gold medal in the C-1 4 × 200 m relay at the 2010 ICF Canoe Sprint World Championships in Poznań.
