= Ferenc Szekszárdi =

Australian canoeist

Personal information
- Born: 22 September 1979 (age 46)

Sport
- Sport: Canoe sprint

Ferenc Szekszárdi (born 22 September 1979) is a Hungarian-born Australian canoeist. He competed in the men's C-1 200 metres and men's C-2 1000 metres events at the 2016 Summer Olympics.
