= Arsen Śliwiński =

Polish sprint canoeist

Personal information
- Nationality: Polish
- Born: 3 April 1996 (age 30)

Sport
- Country: Poland
- Sport: Canoe sprint
- Event(s): C-2 200 m, C-2 500 m
Medal record
Men's canoe sprint
Representing Poland
World Championships
| Silver medal – second place | 2017 Račice | C-2 200 m |
| Silver medal – second place | 2018 Montemor-o-Velho | C-2 200 m |
| Silver medal – second place | 2019 Szeged | C-2 200 m |
| Silver medal – second place | 2021 Copenhagen | C-4 500 m |
| Silver medal – second place | 2022 Dartmouth | C-4 500 m |
| Bronze medal – third place | 2018 Montemor-o-Velho | C-2 500 m |
European Championships
| Gold medal – first place | 2022 Munich | C-2 200 m |
| Silver medal – second place | 2021 Poznań | C-2 200 m |
| Silver medal – second place | 2024 Szeged | C-2 500 m |
| Bronze medal – third place | 2018 Belgrade | C-2 200 m |
| Bronze medal – third place | 2018 Belgrade | C-4 500 m |

Arsen Śliwiński (born 3 April 1996) is a Polish sprint canoeist. He participated at the 2017 ICF Canoe Sprint World Championships and 2018 ICF Canoe Sprint World Championships.
