= Viktor Melantyev =

Russian canoeist

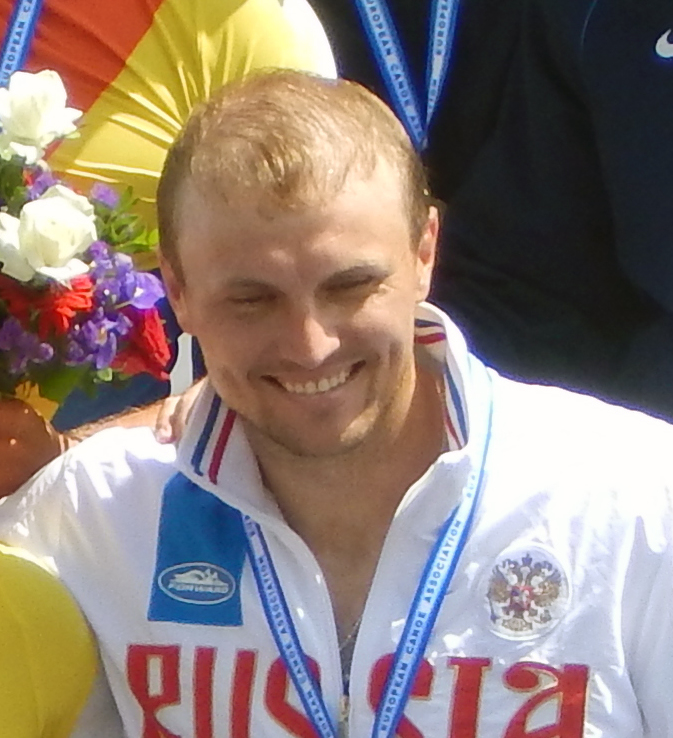
- Melantyev in 2016

Personal information
- Full name: Viktor Sergeyevich Melantyev
- Nationality: Russian
- Born: 2 June 1986 (age 40) Bryukhovetskaya, Krasnodar Krai, RSFSR, USSR (now Russia)
- Height: 1.95 m (6 ft 5 in)
- Weight: 95 kg (209 lb)

Sport
- Country: Russia
- Sport: Canoe sprint
Medal record
Men's canoe sprint
Representing Russia
World Championships
Gold medal – first place	2009 Dartmouth	C-1 4 x 200 m
Gold medal – first place	2011 Szeged	C-1 4 x 200 m
Gold medal – first place	2013 Duisburg	C-2 500 m
Gold medal – first place	2013 Duisburg	C-1 4 x 200 m
Gold medal – first place	2014 Moscow	C-4 1000 m
Gold medal – first place	2017 Račice	C-2 500 m
Gold medal – first place	2018 Montemor-o-Velho	C-4 500 m
Gold medal – first place	2019 Szeged	C-4 500 m
Silver medal – second place	2009 Dartmouth	C-4 200 m
Silver medal – second place	2011 Szeged	C-2 200 m
Silver medal – second place	2013 Duisburg	C-2 1000 m
Silver medal – second place	2018 Montemor-o-Velho	C-2 500 m
Bronze medal – third place	2009 Dartmouth	C-2 1000 m
Bronze medal – third place	2017 Račice	C-2 1000 m
Bronze medal – third place	2021 Copenhagen	C-2 500 m
Bronze medal – third place	2021 Copenhagen	C-4 500 m
European Championships
Gold medal – first place	2008 Milan	C-4 200 m
Gold medal – first place	2009 Brandenburg	C-4 200 m
Gold medal – first place	2009 Brandenburg	C-1 4 x 200 m
Gold medal – first place	2015 Račice	C-4 500 m
Gold medal – first place	2016 Moscow	C-4 1000 m
Gold medal – first place	2016 Moscow	C-2 500 m
Gold medal – first place	2017 Plovdiv	C-2 500 m
Gold medal – first place	2018 Belgrade	C-4 500 m
Gold medal – first place	2021 Poznań	C-2 500 m
Silver medal – second place	2017 Plovdiv	C-2 1000 m
Bronze medal – third place	2009 Brandenburg	C-2 1000 m
Bronze medal – third place	2014 Brandenburg	C-1 1000 m
Universiade
Gold medal – first place	2013 Kazan	C-2 200 m
Gold medal – first place	2013 Kazan	C-2 500 m
Gold medal – first place	2013 Kazan	C-2 1000 m

Viktor Sergeyevich Melantyev (Russian: Виктор Сергеевич Мелантьев, also transliterated Melantev, born 2 June 1986) is a Russian sprint canoeist who has competed since the late 2000s. He won a complete set of medals at the 2009 ICF Canoe Sprint World Championships in Dartmouth with a gold in the C-1 4 × 200 m, a silver in the C-4 200 m, and a bronze in the C-2 1000 m events.

Melantev also competed for Russia at the 2008 Summer Olympics in the C-1 1000 m event, but was eliminated in the semifinals.

He competed with the Russian Olympic Committee athletes at the 2020 Summer Olympics in the C-1 1000 m and C-2 1000 m events.
