= Oleksandr Sivkov =

Ukrainian canoeist

Personal information
- Nationality: Ukrainian
- Born: Poltava, Ukraine

Sport
- Country: Ukraine
- Sport: Canoe sprint
Medal record
Men's canoe sprint
Representing Ukraine
European Championships
Silver medal – second place	2018 Belgrade	C-4 500 m

Oleksandr Sivkov (born in Poltava Oblast, Ukraine) is a Ukrainian sprint canoer. He is a silver medalists of the 2018 European Championships.
