= Oleh Borovyk =

Ukrainian canoeist (born 1996)

Personal information
- Nationality: Ukrainian
- Born: 13 August 1996 (age 29) Poltava, Ukraine

Sport
- Country: Ukraine
- Sport: Canoe sprint
Medal record
Men's canoe sprint
Representing Ukraine
World Championships
| Silver medal – second place | 2018 Montemor-o-Velho | C-4 500 m |
European Championships
| Silver medal – second place | 2018 Belgrade | C-4 500 m |

Oleh Borovyk (Ukrainian: Олег Володимирович Боровик; born 13 August 1996) is a Ukrainian sprint canoer. He is a silver medalists of the 2018 World Championships and silver medalist of the 2018 European Championships.
