= Nicolae Craciun =

Italian sprint canoeist (born 1994)

Personal information
- Nationality: Italian
- Born: 14 June 1994 (age 32) Chișinău, Moldova
- Height: 1.86 m (6 ft 1 in)
- Weight: 90 kg (198 lb)

Sport
- Country: Italy
- Sport: Canoe sprint
- Club: Circolo Canottieri Aniene, Polizia di Stato FFOO
Medal record
Men's canoe sprint
Representing Italy
World Championships
Gold medal – first place	2021 Copenhagen	C-2 500 m
Gold medal – first place	2023 Duisburg	C-2 1000 m
Bronze medal – third place	2017 Račice	C-2 500 m
Bronze medal – third place	2018 Montemor-o-Velho	C-4 500 m
European Games
Silver medal – second place	2019 Minsk	C-1 200 m
European Championships
Silver medal – second place	2022 Munich	C-2 1000 m
Bronze medal – third place	2017 Plovdiv	C-2 1000 m

Nicolae Craciun (born 14 June 1994) is an Italian sprint canoeist.

He participated at the 2018 ICF Canoe Sprint World Championships. Craciun also competed for Italy at the 2024 Summer Olympics.

== Honours ==
Collare d'oro al merito sportivo - ribbon for ordinary uniform

Collare d'oro al merito sportivo
2021 World Champion
— 20 December 2021
