= Andrii Rybachok =

Ukrainian canoeist (born 1994)

Personal information
- Nationality: Ukrainian
- Born: 11 November 1994 (age 31) Kovel, Ukraine
- Height: 1.90 m (6 ft 3 in)
- Weight: 86 kg (190 lb)

Sport
- Country: Ukraine
- Sport: Canoe sprint
Medal record
Men's canoe sprint
Representing Ukraine
World Championships
Gold medal – first place	2021 Copenhagen	C-4 500 m
Silver medal – second place	2018 Montemor-o-Velho	C-4 500 m
Bronze medal – third place	2022 Dartmouth	C-4 500 m
Bronze medal – third place	2023 Duisburg	C-4 500 m
European Games
Silver medal – second place	2019 Minsk	C-2 1000 m
European Championships
Silver medal – second place	2018 Belgrade	C-4 500 m
Bronze medal – third place	2021 Poznań	C-2 500 m
Bronze medal – third place	2025 Racice	C-1 200 m

Andrii Rybachok (born 11 November 1994) is a Ukrainian sprint canoeist. He is 2021 World Champion and multiple medalist. He also won several medals at the European Championships.
