= Eduard Shemetylo =

Ukrainian canoeist

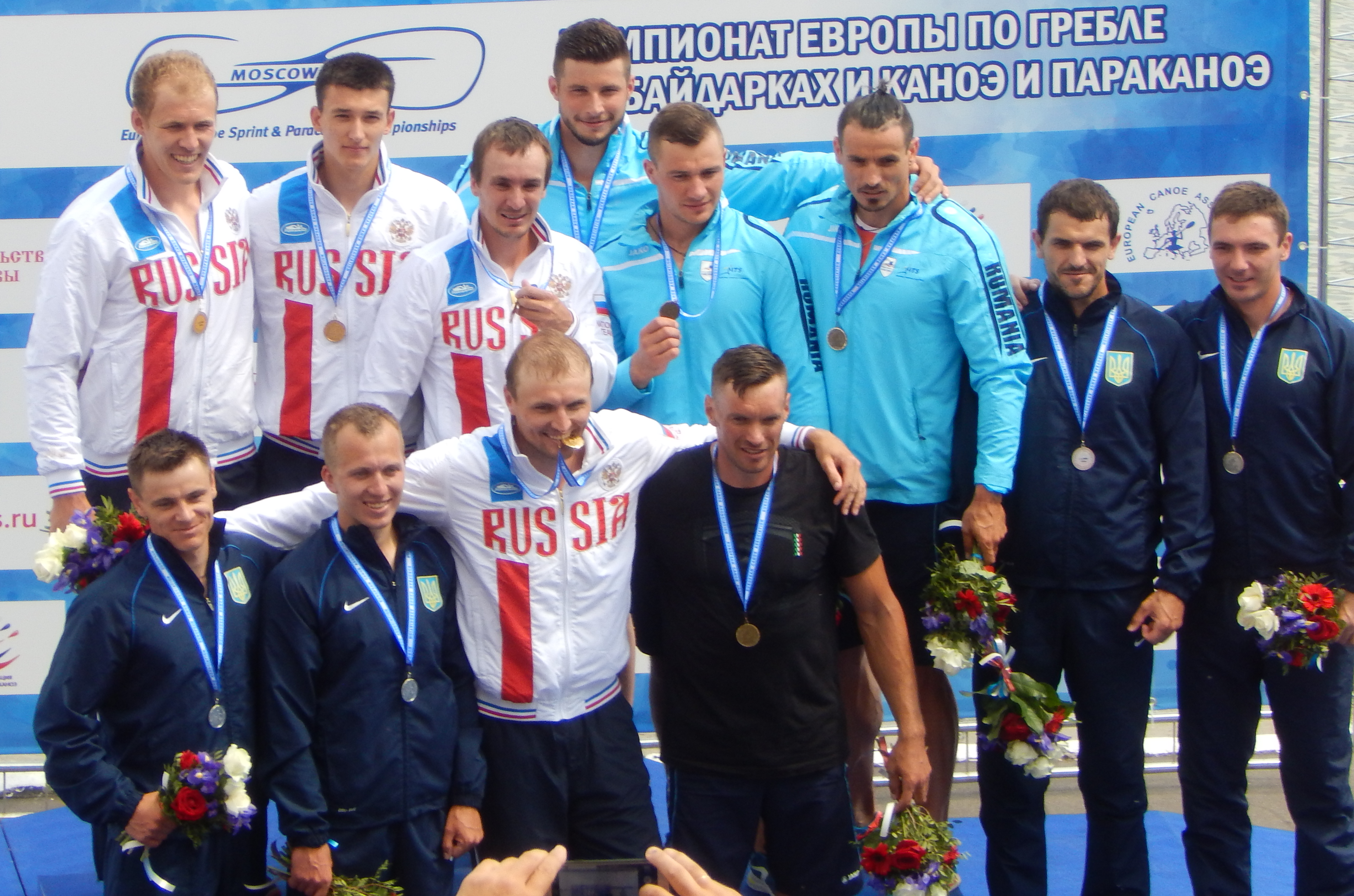

Personal information
- Nationality: Ukrainian
- Born: 14 August 1990 (age 35) Poltava, Ukraine

Sport
- Country: Ukraine
- Sport: Canoe sprint
Medal record
Men's canoe sprint
Representing Ukraine
World Championships
Silver medal – second place	2015 Milan	C-4 1000 m
Silver medal – second place	2018 Montemor-o-Velho	C-4 500 m
Bronze medal – third place	2017 Račice	C-4 1000 m
European Championships
Silver medal – second place	2014 Brandenburg	C-1 5000 m
Silver medal – second place	2016 Moscow	C-4 1000 m
Bronze medal – third place	2013 Montemor-o-Velho	C-4 1000 m
Bronze medal – third place	2015 Račice	C-4 1000 m
Universiade
Gold medal – first place	2013 Kazan	C-4 1000 m
Silver medal – second place	2013 Kazan	C-4 500 m
Men's canoe marathon
Representing Ukraine
World Championships
Silver medal – second place	2011 Singapore	C-2

Eduard Shemetylo (born 14 August 1990) is a Ukrainian sprint canoer and marathon canoeist. He is a silver medalists of the World Championships and medalist of the European Championships.
