= Yurii Vandiuk =

Ukrainian canoeist

Personal information
- Native name: Юрій Васильович Вандюк
- Full name: Yurii Vasylovych Vandiuk
- Nationality: Ukrainian
- Born: 7 May 1994 (age 32) Kovel, Ukraine
- Height: 1.78 m (5 ft 10 in)

Sport
- Country: Ukraine
- Sport: Canoe sprint
Medal record
Men's canoe sprint
Representing Ukraine
World Championships
Gold medal – first place	2021 Copenhagen	C-4 500 m
Silver medal – second place	2018 Montemor-o-Velho	C-4 500 m
Bronze medal – third place	2022 Dartmouth	C-4 500 m
Bronze medal – third place	2024 Samarkand	C-2 1000 m
European Games
Silver medal – second place	2019 Minsk	C-2 1000 m
European Championships
Silver medal – second place	2018 Belgrade	C-4 500 m

Yurii Vasylovych Vandiuk (Ukrainian: Юрій Васильович Вандюк; born 7 May 1994) is a Ukrainian sprint canoeist. He is 2021 world champion, a silver medalists of the 2018 World Championships and a bronze medalist of the 2022 World Championships. He is also a silver medalist of the 2018 European Championships.

== Major results ==
=== Olympic Games ===
Year	C-1 1000	C-2 1000
2020	8 FB	

=== World championships ===
Year	C-1 1000	C-1 5000	C-2 500	C-2 1000	C-4 500
2017	5 FB				—N/a
2018				1 FB	2nd place, silver medalist(s)
2019		13	5 SF	8	4
2021					1st place, gold medalist(s)
2022		11			3rd place, bronze medalist(s)
2024	—N/a		—N/a	3rd place, bronze medalist(s)	—N/a
