= Taras Mishchuk =

Ukrainian canoeist (born 1995)

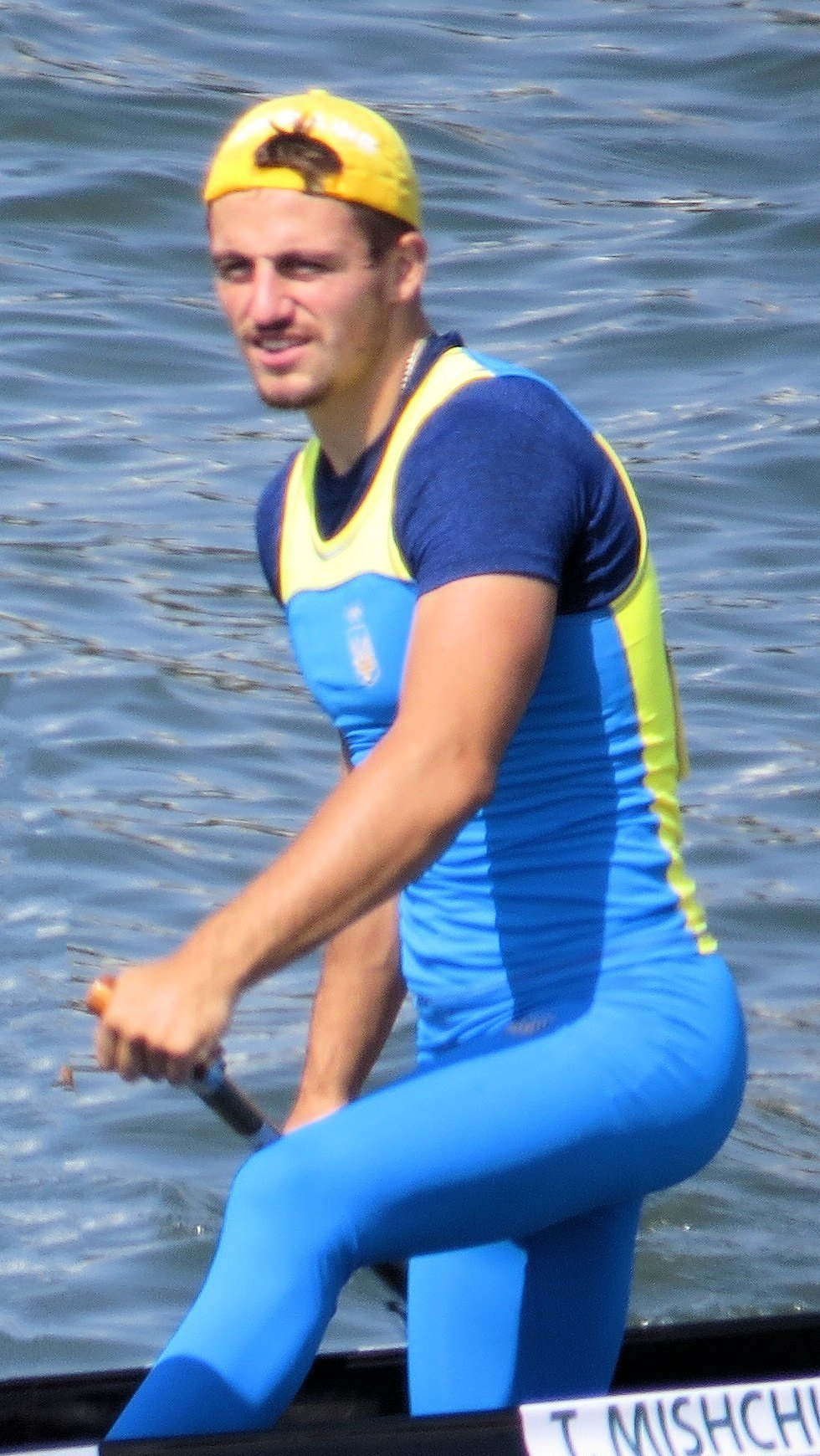
- Mishchuk at the 2016 Olympics

Personal information
- Native name: Тарас Вікторович Міщук
- Full name: Taras Viktorovych Mishchuk
- Born: 22 July 1995 (age 30) Dubno, Ukraine
- Education: Lviv State University of Physical Culture
- Height: 187 cm (6 ft 2 in)
- Weight: 85 kg (187 lb)

Sport
- Sport: Canoe sprint
- Club: Kolos, Lviv
- Coached by: Roman Bundz
Medal record
Men's canoe sprint
Representing Ukraine
Olympic Games
Bronze medal – third place	2016 Rio de Janeiro	C-2 1000 m
World Championships
Gold medal – first place	2021 Copenhagen	C-4 500 m
Bronze medal – third place	2015 Milan	C-2 500 m
Bronze medal – third place	2022 Dartmouth	C-4 500 m
Bronze medal – third place	2023 Duisburg	C-4 500 m
European Championships
Gold medal – first place	2015 Račice	C-2 1000 m
Silver medal – second place	2015 Račice	C-2 500 m
Bronze medal – third place	2014 Brandenburg	C-4 1000 m
Bronze medal – third place	2017 Plovdiv	C-2 500 m
Bronze medal – third place	2018 Belgrade	C-2 500 m

Taras Viktorovych Mishchuk (Ukrainian: Тарас Вікторович Міщук; born 22 July 1995) is a Ukrainian sprint canoeist. He is the 2016 Olympic bronze medalist in the C-2 1000 metres event, the 2015 World bronze medalist in C-2 500 metres, and the 2015 European champion in C-2 1000 m. Mishchuk competes together with Dmytro Ianchuk.

Mishchuk took up canoeing aged 12 in Dubno because "there was no other sport to do there".
