= Sergiu Craciun =

Italian canoeist

Personal information
- Nationality: Italian
- Born: 30 June 1984 (age 41)
- Height: 1.70 m (5 ft 7 in)
- Weight: 78 kg (172 lb)

Sport
- Country: Italy
- Sport: Canoe sprint
- Event: Canoeing
- Club: Fiamme Oro
Medal record
World Championships
Bronze medal – third place	2018 Montemor-o-Velho	C-4 500 m

Sergiu Craciun (born 30 June 1984) is an Italian sprint canoeist.

He participated at the 2018 ICF Canoe Sprint World Championships.
