= Dmytro Ianchuk =

Ukrainian canoeist (born 1992)

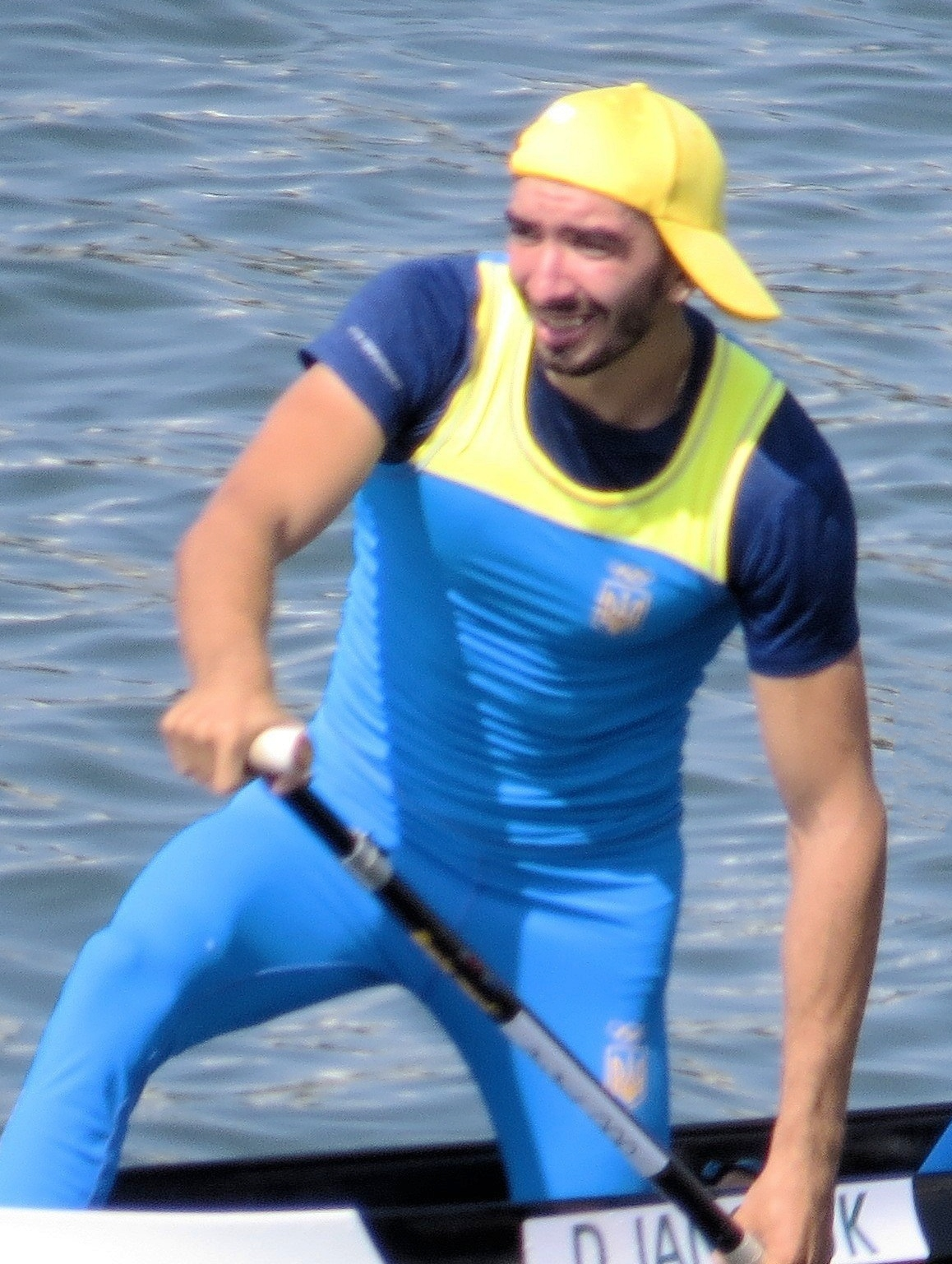
- Ianchuk at the 2016 Olympics

Personal information
- Native name: Дмитро Миколайович Янчук
- Full name: Dmytro Mykolayevych Ianchuk
- Born: 14 November 1992 (age 33) Khmelnytskyi, Ukraine
- Education: Khmelnytskyi National University
- Height: 184 cm (6 ft 0 in)
- Weight: 75 kg (165 lb)

Sport
- Sport: Canoe sprint
- Club: Hirnyk Sports Club
- Coached by: Mykola Matsapura
Medal record
Representing Ukraine
Olympic Games
Bronze medal – third place	2016 Rio de Janeiro	C-2 1000 m
World Championships
Bronze medal – third place	2015 Milan	C-2 500 m
Bronze medal – third place	2023 Duisburg	C-4 500 m
European Championships
Gold medal – first place	2015 Račice	C-2 1000 m
Silver medal – second place	2015 Račice	C-2 500 m
Bronze medal – third place	2014 Brandenburg	C-4 1000 m
Bronze medal – third place	2015 Račice	C-4 1000 m
Bronze medal – third place	2017 Plovdiv	C-2 500 m
Bronze medal – third place	2018 Belgrade	C-2 500 m
Universiade
Gold medal – first place	2013 Kazan	C-4 1000 m
Silver medal – second place	2013 Kazan	C-4 500 m

Dmytro Mykolayovych Ianchuk (Ukrainian: Дмитро Миколайович Янчук; born 14 November 1992) is a Ukrainian sprint canoeist.

== Career ==
He is the 2016 Olympic bronze medalist in the C-2 1000 metres event, the 2015 World bronze medalist in C-2 500 metres, and the 2015 European champion in C-2 1000 m. Ianchuk competes together with Taras Mishchuk.

Ianchuk took up canoeing in 2004 following his brother. He has a degree in health studies from the Khmelnytskyi National University.

At the 2016 Olympic Games, Dmytro Yanchuk, along with Taras Mishchuk, finished second in the first race, behind the Brazilian crew, and reached the final after winning the semifinals. In the final race, the Ukrainians finished third with a time of 3 minutes 45.949 seconds, again lagging behind the Brazilians and letting the German crew take first place.

At the 2020 Olympic Games in Tokyo, he took 13th place in the canoe double with Pavlo Altukhov C-2 1000m 13th place.
