= Hleb Saladukha =

Belarusian canoeist

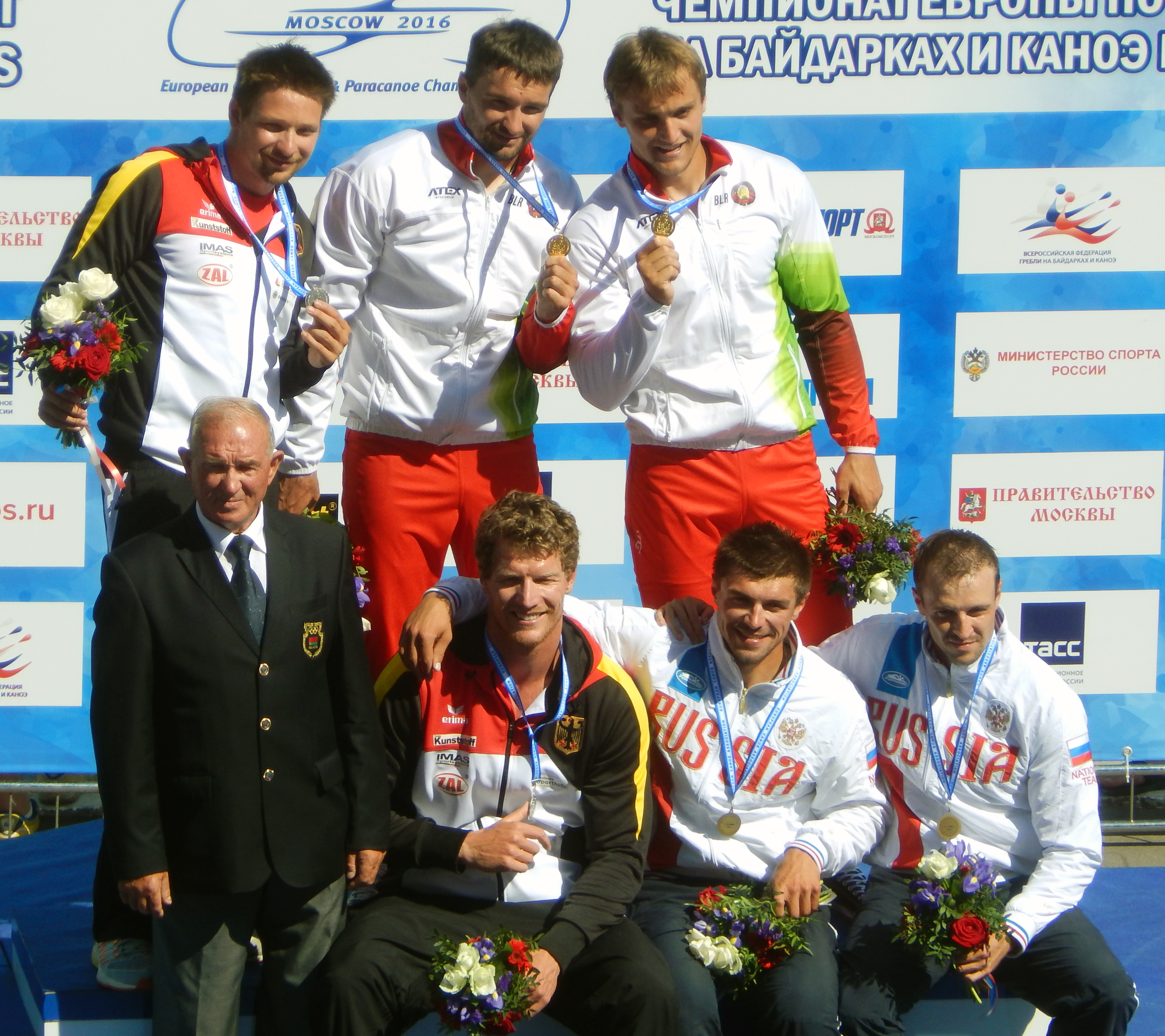

Personal information
- Nationality: Belarusian
- Born: 27 December 1994 (age 31)
- Height: 1.84 m (6 ft 0 in)
- Weight: 85 kg (187 lb)

Sport
- Country: Belarus
- Sport: Canoe sprint
- Event: Canoeing
Medal record
World Championships
Gold medal – first place	2018 Montemor-o-Velho	C-2 200 m

Hleb Saladukha (born 27 December 1994) is a Belarusian sprint canoeist. He participated at the 2018 ICF Canoe Sprint World Championships.
