= Victor Mihalachi =

Romanian canoeist

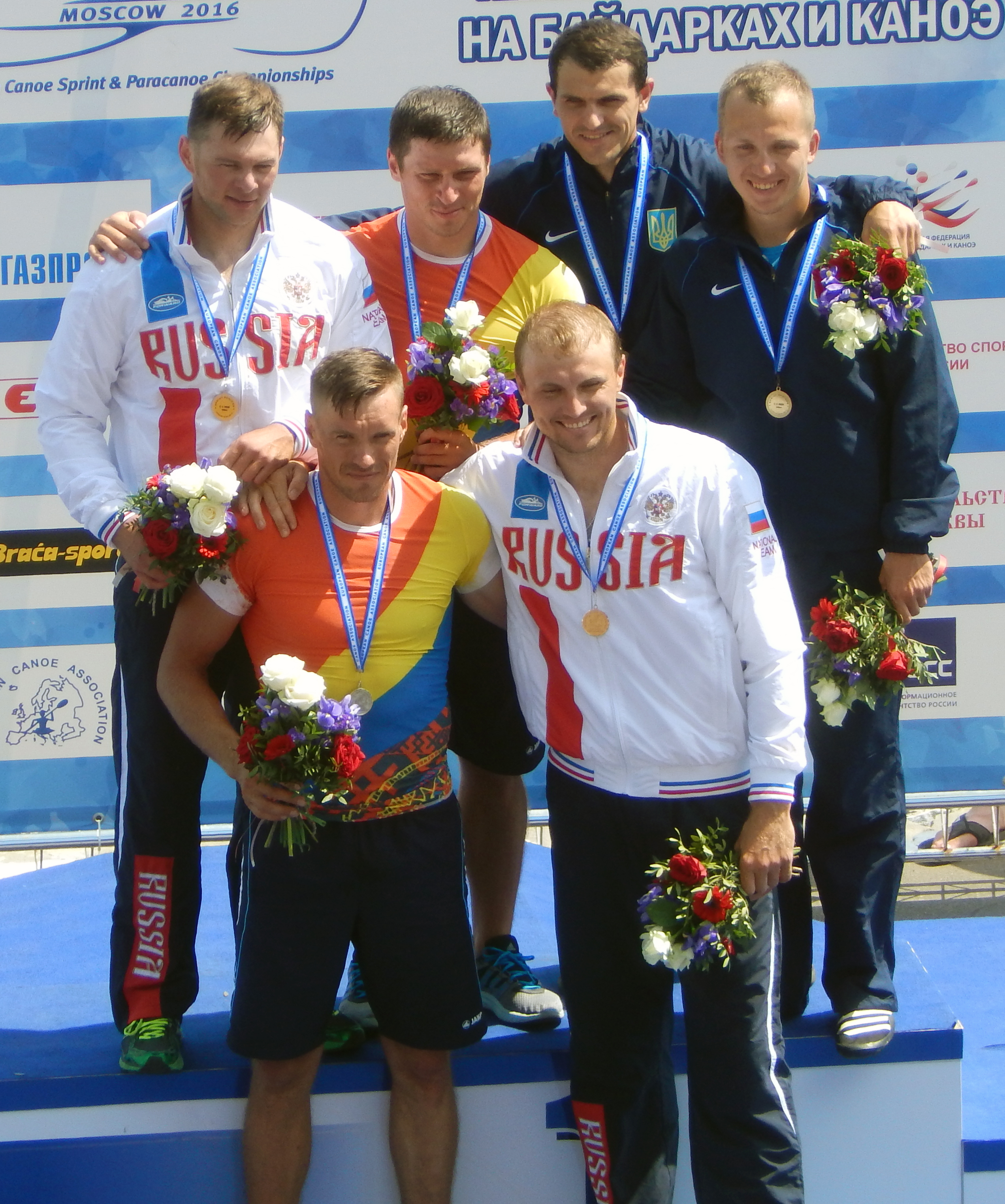
- Mihalachi at awards for two-man canoe, bottom left

Personal information
- Born: 24 February 1989 (age 37) Mirnoe, Ciobanovca, Anenii Noi, Moldova
Medal record
Men's canoe sprint
Representing Romania
World Championships
Gold medal – first place	2010 Poznań	C-2 500 m
Gold medal – first place	2010 Poznań	C-2 1000 m
Gold medal – first place	2011 Szeged	C-2 500 m
Gold medal – first place	2014 Moscow	C-2 1000 m
Silver medal – second place	2014 Moscow	C-2 500 m
Silver medal – second place	2017 Račice	C-2 500 m
Bronze medal – third place	2011 Szeged	C-2 1000 m
European Games
Gold medal – first place	2019 Minsk	C-2 1000 m
European Championships
Gold medal – first place	2010 Trasona	C-2 500 m
Gold medal – first place	2011 Belgrade	C-2 500 m
Gold medal – first place	2012 Zagreb	C-2 1000 m
Gold medal – first place	2018 Belgrade	C-2 500 m
Silver medal – second place	2012 Zagreb	C-2 500 m
Silver medal – second place	2013 Montemor-o-Velho	C-2 500 m
Silver medal – second place	2014 Brandenburg	C-2 500 m
Silver medal – second place	2016 Moscow	C-2 500 m
Silver medal – second place	2017 Plovdiv	C-2 500 m
Silver medal – second place	2018 Belgrade	C-2 1000 m
Bronze medal – third place	2010 Trasona	C-2 1000 m
Bronze medal – third place	2011 Belgrade	C-2 1000 m
Bronze medal – third place	2013 Montemor-o-Velho	C-2 1000 m
Bronze medal – third place	2014 Brandenburg	C-2 200 m
Bronze medal – third place	2021 Poznań	C-2 1000 m

Victor Mihalachi (born 24 February 1989) is a Romanian sprint canoeist who has competed since the late 2000s.

He won 4 gold medals at the ICF Canoe Sprint World Championships, two at the 2010 ICF Canoe Sprint World Championships in Poznań, earning them in the C-2 500 m and C-2 1000 m events, one at the 2011 ICF Canoe Sprint World Championships in Szeged (in the C-2 500 m) and one at the 2014 ICF Canoe Sprint World Championships in Moscow (in the C-2 1000 m). He has also won two silvers, in the C-2 500 m (2014, 2017) and a bronze in the C-2 1000 m (2011).

He has also won three European gold medals (C-2 500 m 2010, 2011; C-2 1000 m 2012), 5 silvers (C-2 500 m 2012, 2013, 2014, 2016, 2017) and 4 bronze (C-2 1000 m 2010, 2011, 2013, C-2 200 m 2014).

He and his teammate Liviu Dumitrescu have worn lucky caps with marijuana leaves on to race in. They competed at the 2012 Summer Olympics.

Mihalachi took up the sport at the age of 9. He competed for Moldova as a junior but switched to competing for Romania as he felt he was not receiving enough support from the Moldovan Canoeing Federation.
