= Daniele Santini =

Italian canoeist (born 1992)

Personal information
- Nationality: Italian
- Born: 3 November 1992 (age 33) Sezze

Sport
- Country: Italy
- Sport: Canoe sprint
Medal record
Men's canoe sprint
Representing Italy
World Championships
Gold medal – first place	2021 Copenhagen	C-2 500 m
Gold medal – first place	2023 Duisburg	C-2 1000 m
Bronze medal – third place	2018 Montemor-o-Velho	C-4 500 m
Bronze medal – third place	2023 Duisburg	C-2 Mix 500 m
European Championships
Silver medal – second place	2022 Munich	C-2 1000 m
Bronze medal – third place	2012 Zagreb	C-2 200 m
Bronze medal – third place	2015 Račice	C-2 200 m

Daniele Santini (born 3 November 1992) is an Italian sprint canoeist.

He participated at the 2018 ICF Canoe Sprint World Championships.
