= Yul Oeltze =

German canoeist (born 1993)

Personal information
- Nationality: German
- Born: 13 September 1993 (age 32) Magdeburg, Germany

Sport
- Country: Germany
- Sport: Canoe sprint
- Event: Canoeing
- Club: SC Magdeburg
Medal record
World Championships
Gold medal – first place	2017 Račice	C-2 1000 m
Gold medal – first place	2018 Montemor-o-Velho	C-2 1000 m

Yul Oeltze (born 13 September 1993) is a German sprint canoeist. He participated at the 2018 ICF Canoe Sprint World Championships.
