= Luca Incollingo =

Italian canoeist

Personal information
- Nationality: Italian
- Born: 26 May 1987 (age 39)
- Height: 1.81 m (5 ft 11 in)
- Weight: 77 kg (170 lb)

Sport
- Country: Italy
- Sport: Canoe sprint
- Event: Canoeing
Medal record
World Championships
Bronze medal – third place	2018 Montemor-o-Velho	C-4 500 m

Luca Incollingo (born 26 May 1987) is an Italian sprint canoeist.

He participated at the 2018 ICF Canoe Sprint World Championships.
