= 2018 ICF Canoe Sprint World Championships =

- Venue: Centro de Alto Rendimento de Montemor-o-Velho
- Location: Montemor-o-Velho, Portugal
- Dates: 22–26 August

The 2018 ICF Canoe Sprint World Championships, the 44th edition of the World Championships, were held in Montemor-o-Velho, Portugal, from 22 to 26 August 2018.

== Explanation of events ==
Canoe sprint competitions were contested in either a Canadian canoe (C), an open canoe with a single-blade paddle, or in a kayak (K), a closed canoe with a double-bladed paddle. Each canoe or kayak can hold one person (1), two people (2), or four people (4). For each of the specific canoes or kayaks, such as a K-1 (kayak single), the competition distances can be 200, 500, 1000 or 5000 metres. When a competition is listed as a K-2 500m event, for example, it means two people were in a kayak competing over a distance of 500 metres.

Paracanoe competitions were contested in either a va'a (V), an outrigger canoe (which includes a second pontoon) with a single-blade paddle, or in a kayak (as above). All international competitions were held over 200 metres in single-man boats, with three event classes in both types of vessel for men and women depending on the level of an athlete's impairment. The lower the classification number, the more severe the impairment is - for example, VL1 is a va'a competition for those with particularly severe impairments.

== Canoe sprint ==
=== Medal table ===
Rank	Nation	Gold	Silver	Bronze	Total
1	Germany	7	4	2	13
2	Hungary	6	1	2	9
3	Russia	3	3	5	11
4	Belarus	3	2	3	8
5	Canada	3	0	1	4
6	Brazil	2	0	1	3
7	Portugal	2	0	0	2
8	New Zealand	1	4	0	5
9	Spain	1	3	2	6
10	Czech Republic	1	1	2	4
11	Great Britain	1	1	0	2
12	Poland	0	3	3	6
13	Cuba	0	2	0	2
13	Denmark	0	2	0	2
15	Lithuania	0	1	2	3
15	Serbia	0	1	2	3
17	Ukraine	0	1	1	2
18	Slovakia	0	1	0	1
19	Chile	0	0	1	1
19	Ireland	0	0	1	1
19	Italy	0	0	1	1
19	South Africa	0	0	1	1
19	Sweden	0	0	1	1
Totals (23 entries)		30	30	31	91

=== Men's events ===
Non-Olympic classes

==== Canoe ====
Event	Gold		Silver		Bronze	
C–1 200 m	Artsem Kozyr; Belarus	39.810	Ivan Shtyl; Russia	39.970	Henrikas Žustautas; Lithuania	40.043
C–1 500 m	Isaquias Queiroz; Brazil	1:49.203	Sebastian Brendel; Germany	1:49.496	Martin Fuksa; Czech Republic	1:50.143
C–1 1000 m	Sebastian Brendel; Germany	3:48.390	Martin Fuksa; Czech Republic	3:49.625	Isaquias Queiroz; Brazil	3:50.190
C–1 5000 m	Sebastian Brendel; Germany	23:40.857	Fernando Jorge; Cuba	23:46.646	Kirill Shamshurin; Russia	24:09.504
C–2 200 m	Belarus; Hleb Saladukha; Dzianis Makhlai	37.646	Poland; Arsen Śliwiński; Michał Łubniewski	37.816	Russia; Alexander Kovalenko; Ivan Shtyl	37.993
C–2 500 m	Brazil; Isaquias Queiroz; Erlon Silva	1:40.043	Russia; Viktor Melantev; Vladislav Chebotar	1:41.590	Poland; Arsen Śliwiński; Michał Łubniewski	1:41.787
C–2 1000 m	Germany; Yul Oeltze; Peter Kretschmer	3:38.207	Cuba; Serguey Torres; Fernando Jorge	3:39.462	Russia; Kirill Shamshurin; Ilya Pervukhin	3:40.647
C–4 500 m	Russia; Pavel Petrov; Viktor Melantyev; Mikhail Pavlov; Ivan Shtyl	1:35.606	Ukraine; Yurii Vandiuk; Oleh Borovyk; Andrii Rybachok; Eduard Shemetylo	1:36.726	Italy; Daniele Santini; Sergiu Craciun; Nicolae Craciun; Luca Incollingo	1:37.196

==== Kayak ====
Event	Gold		Silver		Bronze	
K–1 200 m	Carlos Garrote; Spain	35.259	Artūras Seja; Lithuania	35.366	Evgenii Lukantsov; Russia	35.512
K–1 500 m	Josef Dostál; Czech Republic	1:37.905	Tom Liebscher; Germany	1:38.912	Bence Nádas; Hungary	1:39.516
K–1 1000 m	Fernando Pimenta; Portugal	3:27.666	Max Rendschmidt; Germany	3:28.391	Josef Dostál; Czech Republic	3:29.177
K–1 5000 m	Fernando Pimenta; Portugal	21:42.196	René Holten Poulsen; Denmark	21:43.723	Javier Hernanz; Spain	21:46.565
K–2 200 m	Hungary; Márk Balaska; Balázs Birkás	31.873	Spain; Saúl Craviotto; Cristian Toro	32.133	Serbia; Nebojša Grujić; Marko Novaković	32.156
K–2 500 m	Russia; Artem Kuzakhmetov; Vladislav Blintsov	1:30.666	Serbia; Stefan Vekić; Vladimir Torubarov	1:30.953	Lithuania; Ričardas Nekriošius; Andrej Olijnik	1:31.449
K–2 1000 m	Germany; Max Hoff; Marcus Gross	3:15.797	Spain; Francisco Cubelos; Íñigo Peña	3:16.617	Serbia; Marko Tomićević; Milenko Zorić	3:17.407
K–4 500 m	Germany; Max Rendschmidt; Tom Liebscher; Ronald Rauhe; Max Lemke	1:20.056	Spain; Saúl Craviotto; Marcus Walz; Cristian Toro; Rodrigo Germade	1:20.423	Hungary; Sándor Tótka; Péter Molnár; Miklós Dudás; István Kuli	1:21.480
K–4 1000 m	Germany; Tamás Gecső; Jakob Thordsen; Jacob Schopf; Lukas Reuschenbach	2:57.947	Slovakia; Samuel Baláž; Juraj Tarr; Erik Vlček; Gábor Jakubík	2:58.914	Spain; Francisco Cubelos; Rubén Millán; Pelayo Roza; Íñigo Peña	2:59.341

=== Women's events ===
Non-Olympic classes

==== Canoe ====
Event	Gold		Silver		Bronze	
C–1 200 m	Laurence Vincent-Lapointe; Canada	45.567	Olesia Romasenko; Russia	46.242	Dorota Borowska; Poland	46.812
C–1 200 m	Laurence Vincent-Lapointe; Canada	45.567	Olesia Romasenko; Russia	46.242	Alena Nazdrova; Belarus	46.812
C–1 500 m	Kseniia Kurach; Russia	2:10.991	Alena Nazdrova; Belarus	2:11.631	Katie Vincent; Canada	2:12.148
C–1 5000 m	Laurence Vincent-Lapointe; Canada	27:43.020	Annika Loske; Germany	27:52.541	María Mailliard; Chile	27:59.547
C–2 200 m	Belarus; Alena Nazdrova; Kamila Bobr	45.234	Poland; Sylwia Szczerbińska; Dorota Borowska	46.158	Russia; Kseniia Kurach; Olesya Nikiforova	46.668
C–2 500 m	Canada; Laurence Vincent-Lapointe; Katie Vincent	1:56.395	Hungary; Virág Balla; Kincső Takács	1:58.632	Belarus; Nadzeya Makarchanka; Volha Klimava	2:00.485

==== Kayak ====
Event	Gold		Silver		Bronze	
K–1 200 m	Lisa Carrington; New Zealand	38.821	Emma Jørgensen; Denmark	40.548	Linnea Stensils; Sweden	40.585
K–1 500 m	Danuta Kozák; Hungary	1:47.254	Lisa Carrington; New Zealand	1:47.984	Volha Khudzenka; Belarus	1:48.724
K–1 1000 m	Dóra Bodonyi; Hungary	4:02.892	Lizzie Broughton; Great Britain	4:03.927	Bridgitte Hartley; South Africa	4:04.017
K–1 5000 m	Lizzie Broughton; Great Britain	24:01.737	Maryna Litvinchuk; Belarus	24:12.014	Jennifer Egan; Ireland	24:15.075
K–2 200 m	Germany; Franziska Weber; Tina Dietze	37.157	New Zealand; Kayla Imrie; Aimee Fisher	37.197	Ukraine; Mariia Kichasova-Skoryk; Anastasiya Horlova	37.294
K–2 500 m	Hungary; Anna Kárász; Danuta Kozák	1:43.065	New Zealand; Lisa Carrington; Caitlin Ryan	1:43.088	Germany; Jasmin Fritz; Steffi Kriegerstein	1:45.589
K–2 1000 m	Hungary; Tamara Csipes; Erika Medveczky	3:39.811	Poland; Paulina Paszek; Justyna Iskrzycka	3:43.758	Germany; Sarah Brüßler; Melanie Gebhardt	3:45.091
K–4 500 m	Hungary; Anna Kárász; Erika Medveczky; Danuta Kozák; Dóra Bodonyi	1:33.761	New Zealand; Lisa Carrington; Aimee Fisher; Kayla Imrie; Caitlin Ryan	1:33.771	Poland; Karolina Naja; Helena Wiśniewska; Anna Puławska; Katarzyna Kołodziejczyk	1:34.568

== Paracanoe ==
=== Medal table ===
Rank	Nation	Gold	Silver	Bronze	Total
1	Great Britain	2	2	3	7
2	Ukraine	2	1	1	4
3	Australia	2	1	0	3
4	Brazil	1	3	1	5
5	Italy	1	1	1	3
6	Russia	1	0	3	4
7	Sweden	1	0	0	1
8	Hungary	0	1	0	1
8	New Zealand	0	1	0	1
10	Romania	0	0	1	1
Totals (10 entries)		10	10	10	30

=== Medal events ===
Non-Paralympic classes

Event	Gold		Silver		Bronze	
Men's KL1	Esteban Farias; Italy	49.796	Róbert Suba; Hungary	50.606	Luis Carlos Cardoso da Silva; Brazil	51.376
Men's KL2	Curtis McGrath; Australia	41.735	Scott Martlew; New Zealand	42.360	Mykola Syniuk; Ukraine	43.230
Men's KL3	Serhii Yemelianov; Ukraine	39.031	Caio Carvalho; Brazil	39.761	Leonid Krylov; Russia	40.896
Men's VL1 (Note: Not included in the medal table due to lack of participation)	Peter Happ; Germany	1:18.764	Robinson Méndez; Chile	1:34.300	not awarded as there were only 2 entries	
Men's VL2	Igor Tofalini; Brazil	54.316	Luis Carlos Cardoso da Silva; Brazil	54.911	Marius Ciustea; Italy	55.246
Men's VL3	Curtis McGrath; Australia	47.642	Caio Carvalho; Brazil	48.837	Jack Eyers; Great Britain	49.492
Women's KL1	Maryna Mazhula; Ukraine	55.665	Eleonora de Paolis; Italy	56.795	Jeanette Chippington; Great Britain	57.050
Women's KL2	Charlotte Henshaw; Great Britain	52.627	Emma Wiggs; Great Britain	53.402	Nadezda Andreeva; Russia	56.412
Women's KL3	Helene Ripa; Sweden	53.671	Amanda Reynolds; Australia	53.881	Mihaela Lulea; Romania	54.826
Women's VL1	Monika Seryu; Japan	1:14.942	not awarded as there was only 1 entry			
Women's VL2	Emma Wiggs; Great Britain	57.766	Jeanette Chippington; Great Britain	1:00.491	Maria Nikiforova; Russia	1:00.546
Women's VL3	Larisa Volik; Russia	1:06.262	Nataliia Lagutenko; Ukraine	1:06.397	Charlotte Henshaw; Great Britain	1:06.407
