= Andrei Bahdanovich =

Belarusian canoeist (born 1987)

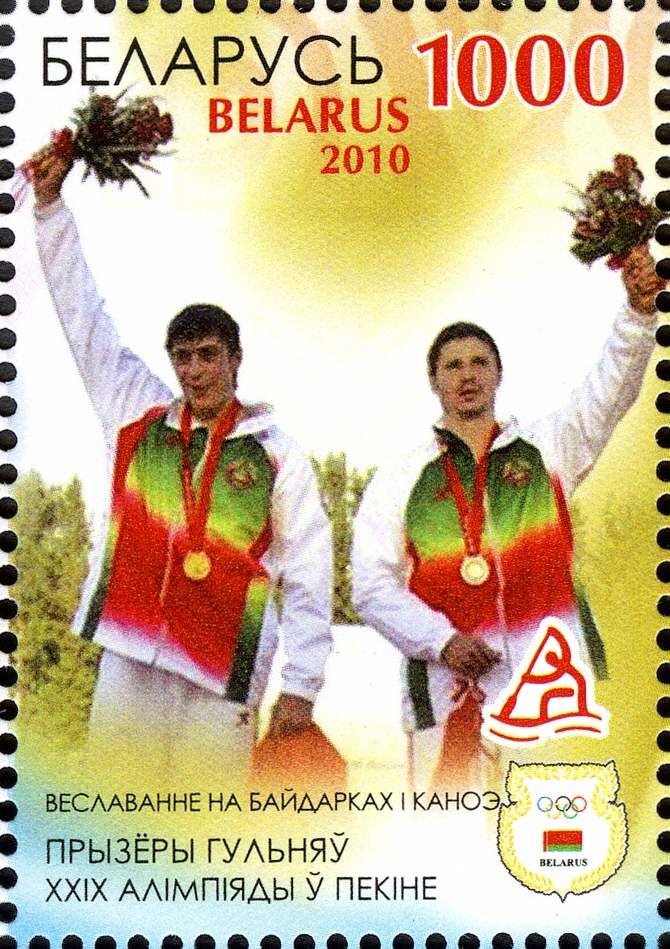
- Andrei (left) and Aliaksandr Bahdanovich on a 2010 Belarusian stamp

Personal information
- Nationality: Belarusian
- Born: 15 October 1987 (age 38) Mahilyow, Byelorussian SSR, USSR
- Height: 1.93 m (6 ft 4 in)
- Weight: 87 kg (192 lb)

Sport
- Country: Belarus
- Sport: Sprint canoe
- Event(s): C-1 500 m, C-2 1000 m, C-4 200 m, C-4 500 m, C-4 1000 m
- Club: BSKP Mahilyow
Medal record
Men's canoe sprint
Representing Belarus
Olympic Games
Gold medal – first place	2008 Beijing	C-2 1000 m
Silver medal – second place	2012 London	C-2 1000 m
World Championships
Silver medal – second place	2010 Poznań	C-2 1000 m
Bronze medal – third place	2006 Szeged	C-4 1000 m
Bronze medal – third place	2019 Szeged	C-4 500 m
European Games
Gold medal – first place	2015 Baku	C-2 1000 m
European Championships
Gold medal – first place	2007 Pontevedra	C-2 500 m
Gold medal – first place	2007 Pontevedra	C-4 500 m
Gold medal – first place	2008 Milan	C-2 500 m
Silver medal – second place	2006 Račice	C-4 500 m
Silver medal – second place	2011 Belgrade	C-2 1000 m
Silver medal – second place	2011 Belgrade	C-4 1000 m
Silver medal – second place	2016 Moscow	C-2 1000 m
Silver medal – second place	2017 Plovdiv	C-2 200 m
Bronze medal – third place	2006 Račice	C-2 1000 m
Bronze medal – third place	2007 Pontevedra	C-2 1000 m
Bronze medal – third place	2008 Milan	C-4 200 m
Bronze medal – third place	2009 Brandenburg	C-4 200 m
Bronze medal – third place	2012 Zagreb	C-2 1000 m
Universiade
Silver medal – second place	2013 Kazan	C-4 200 m
Bronze medal – third place	2013 Kazan	C-1 500 m

Andrei Viktaravich Bahdanovich (Belarusian: Андрэй Віктаравіч Багдановіч, born 15 October 1987) is a Belarusian sprint canoeist. He won a gold medal in the C-2 1000 m event at the 2008 Summer Olympics, rowing together with his brother Aliaksandr Bahdanovich. They finished second in the same event in 2012 Summer Olympics and fourth in the C-2 500 m in 2008.

Bahadanovich also won two medals at the ICF Canoe Sprint World Championships with a silver (C-2 1000 m: 2010) and a bronze (C-4 1000 m: 2006).
