= Róbert Mike =

Hungarian canoeist

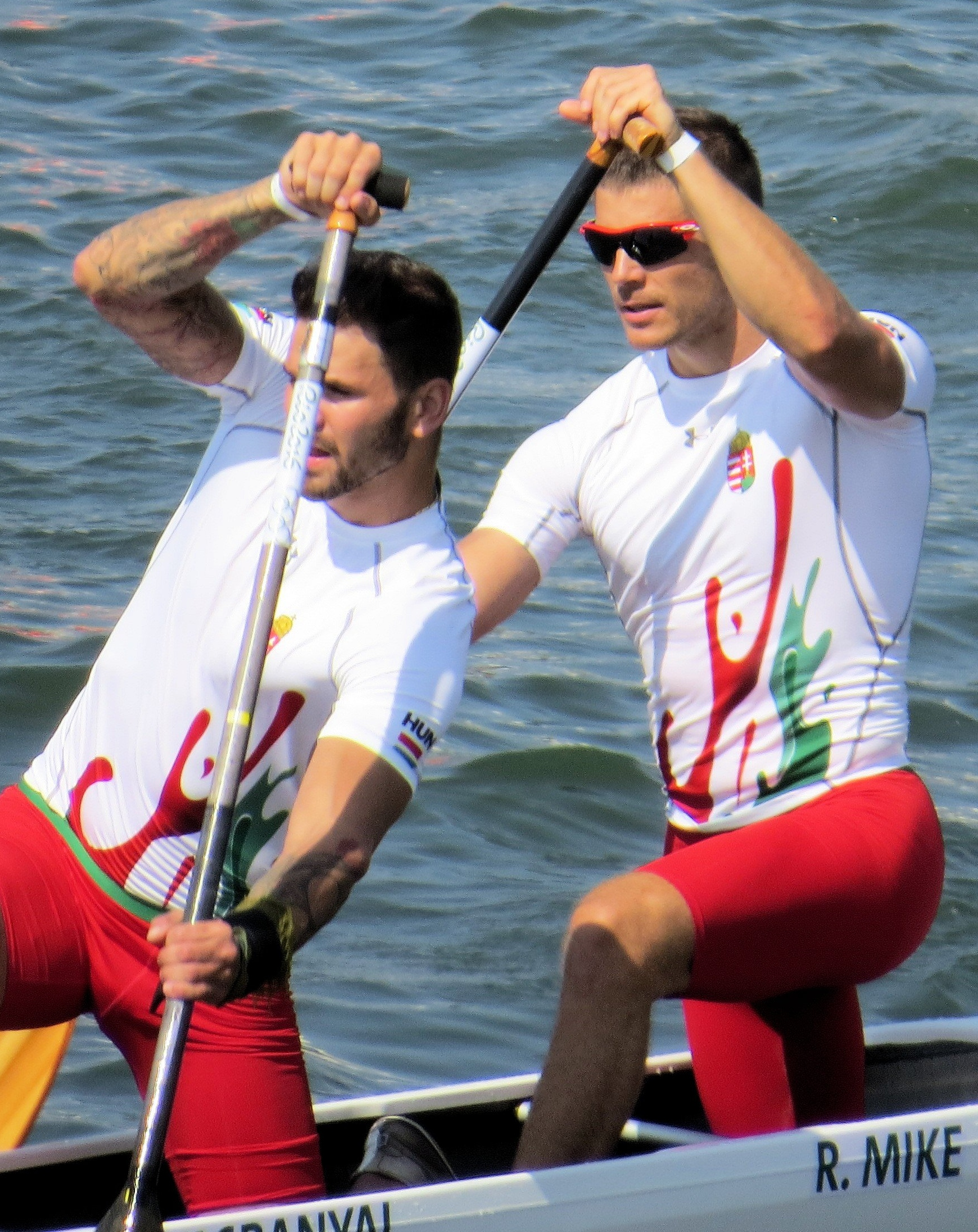
- Vasbányai and Mike (right) at the 2016 Olympics

Personal information
- Born: 8 May 1984 (age 42) Temesvár, Romania
- Height: 176 cm (5 ft 9 in)
- Weight: 80 kg (176 lb)

Sport
- Sport: Canoe sprint
- Club: KSI SE, Budapest
- Coached by: Tamas Olah (personal); Botond Storcz (national)
Medal record
Representing Hungary
World Championships
Bronze medal – third place	2007 Duisburg	C-4 1000 m
Bronze medal – third place	2010 Poznań	C-2 1000 m
Gold medal – first place	2013 Duisburg	C-2 1000 m
Silver medal – second place	2013 Duisburg	C-2 500 m
Silver medal – second place	2014 Moscow	C-2 1000 m
Silver medal – second place	2015 Milan	C-2 1000 m
European Championships
Gold medal – first place	2011 Belgrade	C-4 1000 m
Bronze medal – third place	2012 Zagreb	C-4 1000 m
Silver medal – second place	2013 Montemor-o-Velho	C-2 1000 m
Gold medal – first place	2014 Brandenburg	C-2 1000 m
Bronze medal – third place	2016 Moscow	C-2 1000 m

Róbert Mike (born 8 May 1984) is a Hungarian sprint canoeist who competed in two-man and four-man events, mostly with Henrik Vasbányai. Between 2013 and 2015 they won one gold and three silver medals at the world championships. They placed fourth at the 2016 Olympics.
