= Dzianis Makhlai =

Belarusian sprint canoeist

Personal information
- Nationality: Belarusian
- Born: 19 September 1990 (age 35)
- Height: 1.82 m (6 ft 0 in)
- Weight: 82 kg (181 lb)

Sport
- Country: Belarus
- Sport: Canoe sprint
- Event: Canoeing
Medal record
World Championships
Gold medal – first place	2018 Montemor-o-Velho	C-2 200 m

Dzianis Makhlai (born 19 September 1990) is a Belarusian sprint canoeist. He participated at the 2018 ICF Canoe Sprint World Championships.
