= 2026 ICF Canoe Sprint World Championships – Men's C-2 500 metres =

Men's C-2 500 metres at the 2026 ICF Canoe Sprint World Championships
- Venue: Lake Malta
- Location: Poznań, Poland
- Dates: 27–30 August
- Competitors: 50 from 25 nations
- Winning time: 1:39.23

Medalists
gold medal	Zakhar Petrov; Ivan Shtyl	Individual Neutral Athletes
silver medal	Gabriel Assunção; Jacky Godmann	Brazil
bronze medal	Kristóf Kollár; István Juhász	Hungary

The men's C-2 500 metres competition at the 2026 ICF Canoe Sprint World Championships in Poznań took place in Lake Malta.

== Schedule ==
The schedule is as follows:

Date	Time	Round
Thursday 27 August 2026	10:21	Heats
Saturday 29 August 2026	10:23	Semifinals
Sunday 30 August 2026	09:03	Final B
Sunday 30 August 2026	10:47	Final A

== Results ==
=== Heats ===
The following are the results of the heats of the C-2 500 metres men event. Qualification: first in each heat to final; 2 to 7 in each heat to semi final; remainder eliminated.

Heat 1

Rank	Lane	Team	Time	Gap	Notes
1	8	Neutral Athlete A Uladzislau Paleshko; Danila Verashchaka	1:46.56		FA
2	6	Poland; Wiktor Głazunow; Norman Zezula	1:46.74	+0.18	SF
3	5	Czech Republic; Petr Fuksa; Martin Fuksa	1:47.06	+0.50	SF
4	3	Romania; Ilie Sprincean; Oleg Nuță	1:47.21	+0.65	SF
5	4	China; Yu Yuebin; Yu Chenwei	1:50.79	+4.23	SF
6	2	Ukraine; Volodymyr Savchyn; Taras Kuzyk	1:52.47	+5.91	SF
7	7	Moldova; Mihai Chihaia; Oleg Tarnovschi	1:54.72	+8.16	SF
8	1	India; Raju Rawat; Gyaneshwor Singh Philem	2:03.78	+17.22	
9	9	São Tomé and Príncipe; Admilson Sousa; Jacuberto Conceição	2:13.54	+26.98	

Heat 2

Rank	Lane	Team	Time	Gap	Notes
1	4	Neutral Athlete B Zakhar Petrov; Ivan Shtyl	1:48.16		FA
2	3	Germany; David Töpel; Moritz Adam	1:50.06	+1.90	SF
3	6	Lithuania; Henrikas Žustautas; Vadim Korobov	1:50.66	+2.50	SF
4	5	Italy; Gabriele Casadei; Carlo Tacchini	1:50.69	+2.53	SF
5	8	Kazakhstan; Sergey Yemelyanov; Timofey Yemelyanov	1:53.89	+5.73	SF
6	9	Japan; Komei Iwanaga; Kaito Nagai	1:59.12	+10.96	SF
7	2	Colombia; Daniel Pacheco; Cristián Ávila	2:01.93	+13.77	SF
8	7	United States; Jonathan Grady; Ryan Grady	2:02.44	+14.28	
—	1	Tajikistan; Bobojon Bobojonov; Amirjon Bobojonov	DNS		

Heat 3

Rank	Lane	Team	Time	Gap	Notes
1	6	Spain; Daniel Grijalba; Adrián Sieiro	1:47.90		FA
2	4	Brazil; Gabriel Assunção; Jacky Godmann	1:48.22	+0.32	SF
3	5	Hungary; Kristóf Kollár; István Juhász	1:48.69	+0.79	SF
4	3	Uzbekistan; Artur Guliev; Vladlen Denisov	1:57.22	+9.32	SF
5	7	Canada; Connor Fitzpatrick; Eric Chouinard	1:58.12	+10.22	SF
6	1	Mexico; Gustavo Eslava; Guillermo Quirino	1:58.23	+10.33	SF
7	2	Angola; Manuel António; Domingos Pacavira	2:06.81	+18.91	SF
—	8	Nigeria; Ifeanyi Okuchukwu; Isyaka Muhammed Ibrahim	DSQ		
—	9	Indonesia; Rudiansyah Rudiansyah; Muh Burhan	DNS		

=== Semifinals ===
The results of the semifinals of the C-2 500 metres men event were as follows:

Qualification: Top three in each semi final progress to A final; boats in fourth to seventh and next fastest boat on time progress to B final; remainder are eliminated.

Semifinal 1

Rank	Lane	Team	Time	Gap	Notes
1	5	Brazil; Gabriel Assunção; Jacky Godmann	1:38.47		FA
2	7	Italy; Gabriele Casadei; Carlo Tacchini	1:39.27	+0.80	FA
3	4	Lithuania; Henrikas Žustautas; Vadim Korobov	1:40.27	+1.80	FA
4	6	Czech Republic; Petr Fuksa; Martin Fuksa	1:40.28	+1.81	FB
5	3	Uzbekistan; Artur Guliev; Vladlen Denisov	1:40.37	+1.90	FB
6	2	China; Yu Yuebin; Yu Chenwei	1:41.57	+3.10	FB
7	9	Ukraine; Volodymyr Savchyn; Taras Kuzyk	1:42.51	+4.04	FB
8	1	Angola; Manuel António; Domingos Pacavira	1:47.34	+8.87	qBT
9	8	Japan; Komei Iwanaga; Kaito Nagai	1:53.45	+14.98	

Semifinal 2

Rank	Lane	Team	Time	Gap	Notes
1	6	Hungary; Kristóf Kollár; István Juhász	1:38.54		FA
2	3	Romania; Ilie Sprincean; Oleg Nuță	1:39.18	+0.64	FA
3	5	Poland; Wiktor Głazunow; Norman Zezula	1:39.34	+0.80	FA
4	2	Canada; Connor Fitzpatrick; Eric Chouinard	1:40.35	+1.81	FB
5	4	Germany; David Töpel; Moritz Adam	1:41.07	+2.53	FB
6	9	Moldova; Mihai Chihaia; Oleg Tarnovschi	1:42.74	+4.20	FB
7	7	Kazakhstan; Sergey Yemelyanov; Timofey Yemelyanov	1:43.79	+5.25	FB
8	1	Colombia; Daniel Pacheco; Cristián Ávila	1:48.34	+9.80	
9	8	Mexico; Gustavo Eslava; Guillermo Quirino	1:54.50	+15.96	

=== Finals ===
The results of the finals in the men's C-2 500 metres were as follows:

B final

Rank	Lane	Team	Time	Gap	Notes
1	4	Czech Republic; Petr Fuksa; Martin Fuksa	1:43.49		
2	6	Uzbekistan; Artur Guliev; Vladlen Denisov	1:43.58	+0.09	
3	2	China; Yu Yuebin; Yu Chenwei	1:43.59	+0.10	
4	3	Germany; David Töpel; Moritz Adam	1:44.70	+1.21	
5	5	Canada; Connor Fitzpatrick; Eric Chouinard	1:45.97	+2.48	
6	8	Ukraine; Volodymyr Savchyn; Taras Kuzyk	1:46.12	+2.63	
7	7	Moldova; Mihai Chihaia; Oleg Tarnovschi	1:46.25	+2.76	
8	9	Kazakhstan; Sergey Yemelyanov; Timofey Yemelyanov	1:48.56	+5.07	
9	1	Angola; Manuel António; Domingos Pacavira	1:52.13	+8.64	

A final

Rank	Lane	Team	Time	Gap	Notes
1st place, gold medalist(s)	5	Neutral Athletes A Zakhar Petrov; Ivan Shtyl	1:39.23		
2nd place, silver medalist(s)	7	Brazil; Gabriel Assunção; Jacky Godmann	1:39.81	+0.58	
3rd place, bronze medalist(s)	3	Hungary; Kristóf Kollár; István Juhász	1:40.03	+0.80	
4	4	Spain; Daniel Grijalba; Adrián Sieiro	1:40.09	+0.86	
5	2	Italy; Gabriele Casadei; Carlo Tacchini	1:40.69	+1.46	
6	8	Romania; Ilie Sprincean; Oleg Nuță	1:40.83	+1.60	
7	9	Lithuania; Henrikas Žustautas; Vadim Korobov	1:40.95	+1.72	
8	1	Poland; Wiktor Głazunow; Norman Zezula	1:41.04	+1.81	
9	6	Neutral Athletes B Uladzislau Paleshko; Danila Verashchaka	1:46.39	+7.16	
