= 2025 ICF Canoe Sprint World Championships – Men's C-4 500 metres =

Men's C-4 500 metres at the 2025 ICF Canoe Sprint World Championships
- Venue: Idroscalo Regatta Course
- Location: Milan, Italy
- Dates: 20–23 August
- Competitors: 52 from 13 nations
- Winning time: 1:30.38

Medalists
gold medal	Kristóf Kollár; István Dávid Juhász; Jonatán Hajdu; Dániel Fejes	Hungary
silver medal	Daniel Grijalba; Martin Jacome Couto; Manuel Fontán; Adrián Sieiro	Spain
bronze medal	Ilya Verashchaka; Stanislau Savelyeu; Uladzislau Paleshko; Danila Verashchaka	Individual Neutral Athletes

The men's C-4 500 metres competition at the 2025 ICF Canoe Sprint World Championships in Milan took place in Idroscalo Regatta Course.

== Schedule ==
The schedule is as follows:

Date	Time	Round
Wednesday 20 August 2025	14:52	Heats
Friday 22 August 2025	11:13	Semifinals
Saturday 23 August 2025	15:36	Final A

== Results ==
=== Heats ===
The fastest three boats in each heat advanced directly to the final.
The next four fastest boats in each heat, plus the fastest remaining boat advanced to the semifinal

==== Heat 1 ====
Rank	Canoeist	Country	Time	Notes
1	Kristóf Kollár; István Dávid Juhász; Jonatán Hajdu; Dániel Fejes	Hungary	1:30.71	FA
2	Ilya Verashchaka; Stanislau Savelyeu; Uladzislau Paleshko; Danila Verashchaka	Individual Neutral Athletes	1:31.51	FA
3	Aleksander Kitewski; Juliusz Kitewski; Krystian Holdak; Oleksii Koliadych	Poland	1:32.52	FA
4	Yaroslav Verbliud; Taras Kuzyk; Volodymyr Savchyn; Vitalii Prystai	Ukraine	1:34.57	QS
5	Viktor Stepanov; Polat Turebekov; Anuar Almagambetov; Timofey Yemelyanov	Kazakhstan	1:35.60	QS
6	Zachary Kralik; Alix Plomteux; Andrew Billard; Nikita Ciudin	Canada	1:36.21	QS
7	Georgel Baragau; Ioan Mihai Rotundu; Andrei Rosioru; Nicolae Flores Mateescu	Romania	1:55.32	QS

==== Heat 2 ====
Rank	Canoeist	Country	Time	Notes
1	Daniel Grijalba; Martin Jacome Couto; Manuel Fontán; Adrián Sieiro	Spain	1:30.47	FA
2	Alexey Korovashkov; Aleksandr Bots; Zakhar Petrov; Ivan Shtyl	Individual Neutral Athletes	1:30.50	FA
3	Florin Bange; David Töpel; Moritz Adam; Tim Hecker	Germany	1:32.91	FA
4	Petr Fuksa; Petr Tettinger; Jiří Minařík; Zbyněk Pták	Czech Republic	1:33.69	QS
5	Nicolae Craciun; Samuele Veglianti; Mattia Alfonsi; Marco Tontodonati	Italy	1:34.19	QS
6	Arvind Verma; Gyaneshwor Singh Philem; Raju Rawat; Sunil Singh Salam	India	1:54.93	QS

=== Semifinal ===
The fastest three boats advanced to the A final.

Rank	Canoeist	Country	Time	Notes
1	Zachary Kralik; Alix Plomteux; Andrew Billard; Nikita Ciudin	Canada	1:35.30	FA
2	Petr Fuksa; Petr Tettinger; Jiří Minařík; Zbyněk Pták	Czech Republic	1:35.65	FA
3	Yaroslav Verbliud; Taras Kuzyk; Volodymyr Savchyn; Vitalii Prystai	Ukraine	1:36.46	FA
4	Nicolae Craciun; Samuele Veglianti; Mattia Alfonsi; Marco Tontodonati	Italy	1:36.86	
5	Viktor Stepanov; Polat Turebekov; Anuar Almagambetov; Timofey Yemelyanov	Kazakhstan	1:38.35	
6	Georgel Baragau; Ioan Mihai Rotundu; Andrei Rosioru; Nicolae Flores Mateescu	Romania	1:38.90	
7	Arvind Verma; Gyaneshwor Singh Philem; Raju Rawat; Sunil Singh Salam	India	1:48.59	

=== Final ===
Competitors raced for positions 1 to 9, with medals going to the top three.

Rank	Canoeist	Country	Time	Notes
1st place, gold medalist(s)	Kristóf Kollár; István Dávid Juhász; Jonatán Hajdu; Dániel Fejes	Hungary	1:30.38	
2nd place, silver medalist(s)	Daniel Grijalba; Martin Jacome Couto; Manuel Fontán; Adrián Sieiro	Spain	1:31.15	
3rd place, bronze medalist(s)	Ilya Verashchaka; Stanislau Savelyeu; Uladzislau Paleshko; Danila Verashchaka	Individual Neutral Athletes	1:31.45	
4	Alexey Korovashkov; Aleksandr Bots; Zakhar Petrov; Ivan Shtyl	Individual Neutral Athletes	1:32.12	
5	Aleksander Kitewski; Juliusz Kitewski; Krystian Holdak; Oleksii Koliadych	Poland	1:33.40	
6	Petr Fuksa; Petr Tettinger; Jiří Minařík; Zbyněk Pták	Czech Republic	1:33.85	
7	Florin Bange; David Töpel; Moritz Adam; Tim Hecker	Germany	1:34.04	
8	Zachary Kralik; Alix Plomteux; Andrew Billard; Nikita Ciudin	Canada	1:34.15	
9	Yaroslav Verbliud; Taras Kuzyk; Volodymyr Savchyn; Vitalii Prystai	Ukraine	1:34.64	
