= 2023 ICF Canoe Sprint World Championships – Men's C-4 500 metres =

Men's C-4 500 metres at the 2023 ICF Canoe Sprint World Championships
- Venue: Sportpark Duisburg
- Location: Duisburg, Germany
- Dates: 26 August
- Competitors: 32 from 8 nations
- Winning time: 1:30.808

Medalists
gold medal	Joan Antoni Moreno; Pablo Graña; Manuel Fontán; Adrián Sieiro	Spain
silver medal	Aleksander Kitewski; Tomasz Barniak; Wiktor Głazunow; Norman Zezula	Poland
bronze medal	Vitaliy Vergeles; Andrii Rybachok; Dmytro Ianchuk; Taras Mishchuk	Ukraine

The men's C-4 500 metres competition at the 2023 ICF Canoe Sprint World Championships in Duisburg took place in Sportpark Duisburg.

== Schedule ==
The schedule is as follows:

Date	Time	Round
Saturday 26 August 2023	12:39	Final

== Results ==
=== Final ===
With fewer than ten boats entered, this event was held as a direct final.

Rank	Canoeist	Country	Time
1st place, gold medalist(s)	Joan Antoni Moreno; Pablo Graña; Manuel Fontán; Adrián Sieiro	Spain	1:30.808
2nd place, silver medalist(s)	Aleksander Kitewski; Tomasz Barniak; Wiktor Głazunow; Norman Zezula	Poland	1:32.373
3rd place, bronze medalist(s)	Vitaliy Vergeles; Andrii Rybachok; Dmytro Ianchuk; Taras Mishchuk	Ukraine	1:32.725
4	David Koczkas; Ádám Slihoczki; Jonatán Hajdu; David Hodovan	Hungary	1:33.250
5	Viktor Stepanov; Timur Khaidarov; Sergey Yemelyanov; Timofey Yemelyanov	Kazakhstan	1:34.235
6	Moritz Adam; Nico Pickert; Conrad-Robin Scheibner; Michael Müller	Germany	1:36.050
7	Ara Virabyan; Vahe Davtyan; Gevorg Pilosyan; Norik Margaryan	Armenia	1:44.269
8	Arjun Singh; Niraj Verma; Ribason Singh Ningthoujam; Gyaneshwor Singh Philem	India	1:44.842
