= 2025 ICF Canoe Sprint World Championships – Men's C-2 500 metres =

Men's C-2 500 metres at the 2025 ICF Canoe Sprint World Championships
- Venue: Idroscalo Regatta Course
- Location: Milan, Italy
- Dates: 21–24 August
- Competitors: 50 from 25 nations
- Winning time: 1:39.63

Medalists
gold medal	Zakhar Petrov; Ivan Shtyl	Individual Neutral Athletes
silver medal	Yu Yuebin; Yu Chenwei	China
bronze medal	Kristóf Kollár; István Juhász	Hungary

The men's C-2 500 metres competition at the 2025 ICF Canoe Sprint World Championships in Milan took place in Idroscalo Regatta Course.

== Schedule ==
The schedule is as follows:

Date	Time	Round
Thursday 21 August 2025	10:21	Heats
Saturday 23 August 2025	10:28	Semifinals
Sunday 24 August 2025	09:15	Final B
Sunday 24 August 2025	10:47	Final A

== Results ==
=== Heats ===
The fastest boat in each heat advanced directly to the final (QF). The next six fastest boats in each heat advanced to the semifinal (QS)..

==== Heat 1 ====
Rank	Canoeist	Country	Time	Notes
1	Joan Moreno; Diego Domínguez	Spain	1:39.29	QF
2	Nico Pickert; Conrad-Robin Scheibner	Germany	1:40.53	QS
3	Henrikas Žustautas; Vadim Korobov	Lithuania	1:41.65	QS
4	Petr Tettinger; Jiří Minařík	Czech Republic	1:43.16	QS
5	Alix Plomteux; Andrew Billard	Canada	1:43.19	QS
6	Artur Guliev; Vladlen Denisov	Uzbekistan	1:43.89	QS
7	Jonathan Grady; Anuar Akchurin	United States	1:45.49	QS
8	Ryo Naganuma; Shungo Yoshida	Japan	1:47.65	
9	Gevorg Pilosyan; Vahe Davtyan	Armenia	2:01.03	

==== Heat 2 ====
Rank	Canoeist	Country	Time	Notes
1	Zakhar Petrov; Ivan Shtyl	Individual Neutral Athletes	1:38.26	QF
2	Gabriele Casadei; Carlo Tacchini	Italy	1:38.84	QS
3	Ilie Sprîncean; Oleg Nuță	Romania	1:41.16	QS
4	Taras Mazovskyi; Andrii Rybachok	Ukraine	1:44.23	QS
5	Evans Monim; Sofiyanto Sofiyanto	Indonesia	1:48.36	QS
6	Gyaneshwor Singh Philem; Sunil Singh Salam	India	1:50.74	QS
7	Manuel Antonio; Benilson Sanda	Angola	1:52.30	QS
8	Oleg Tarnovschi; Alexandru Tacu	Moldova	2:02.50	

==== Heat 3 ====
Rank	Canoeist	Country	Time	Notes
1	Yu Yuebin; Yu Chenwei	China	1:38.26	QF
2	Kristóf Kollár; István Juhász	Hungary	1:38.49	QS
3	Uladzislau Paleshko; Danila Verashchaka	Individual Neutral Athletes	1:39.70	QS
4	Gabriel Assunção; Jacky Godmann	Brazil	1:39.90	QS
5	Wiktor Głazunow; Arsen Śliwiński	Poland	1:40.05	QS
6	Alejandro Rodríguez; Daniel Pacheco	Colombia	1:43.87	QS
7	Shahriyor Daminov; Amirjon Bobojonov	Tajikistan	1:56.01	QS
8	Janus Ercilla; Neljohn Fabro	Philippines	1:56.51	

=== Semifinals ===
The fastest three boats in each semi advanced to the A final. The next four fastest boats in each semi and best 8th advanced to the final B.

==== Semifinal 1 ====
Rank	Canoeist	Country	Time	Notes
1	Gabriel Assunção; Jacky Godmann	Brazil	1:40.76	FA
2	Nico Pickert; Conrad-Robin Scheibner	Germany	1:41.72	FA
3	Uladzislau Paleshko; Danila Verashchaka	Individual Neutral Athletes	1:42.01	FA
4	Ilie Sprîncean; Oleg Nuță	Romania	1:42.67	FB
5	Artur Guliev; Vladlen Denisov	Uzbekistan	1:44.62	FB
6	Petr Tettinger; Jiří Minařík	Czech Republic	1:44.70	FB
7	Alejandro Rodríguez; Daniel Pacheco	Colombia	1:45.28	FB
8	Evans Monim; Sofiyanto Sofiyanto	Indonesia	1:46.62	fB
9	Manuel Antonio; Benilson Sanda	Angola	1:50.80	

==== Semifinal 2 ====
Rank	Canoeist	Country	Time	Notes
1	Gabriele Casadei; Carlo Tacchini	Italy	1:39.79	FA
2	Kristóf Kollár; István Juhász	Hungary	1:39.96	FA
3	Henrikas Žustautas; Vadim Korobov	Lithuania	1:40.63	FA
4	Wiktor Głazunow; Arsen Śliwiński	Poland	1:40.93	FB
5	Taras Mazovskyi; Andrii Rybachok	Ukraine	1:41.93	FB
6	Alix Plomteux; Andrew Billard	Canada	1:44.67	FB
7	Jonathan Grady; Anuar Akchurin	United States	1:46.10	FB
8	Shahriyor Daminov; Amirjon Bobojonov	Tajikistan	1:49.22	
9	Gyaneshwor Singh Philem; Sunil Singh Salam	India	1:50.24	

=== Finals ===
==== Final B ====
Competitors in this final raced for positions 10 to 18.

Rank	Canoeist	Country	Time	Notes
1	Wiktor Głazunow; Arsen Śliwiński	Poland	1:47.13	
2	Ilie Sprîncean; Oleg Nuță	Romania	1:47.32	
3	Alix Plomteux; Andrew Billard	Canada	1:48.68	
4	Alejandro Rodríguez; Daniel Pacheco	Colombia	1:49.61	
5	Petr Tettinger; Jiří Minařík	Czech Republic	1:49.80	
6	Artur Guliev; Vladlen Denisov	Uzbekistan	1:50.29	
7	Jonathan Grady; Anuar Akchurin	United States	1:51.96	
8	Evans Monim; Sofiyanto Sofiyanto	Indonesia	1:56.43	
DNS	Taras Mazovskyi; Andrii Rybachok	Ukraine		

==== Final A ====
Competitors raced for positions 1 to 9, with medals going to the top three.

Rank	Canoeist	Country	Time	Notes
1st place, gold medalist(s)	Zakhar Petrov; Ivan Shtyl	Individual Neutral Athletes	1:39.63	
2nd place, silver medalist(s)	Yu Yuebin; Yu Chenwei	China	1:40.60	
3rd place, bronze medalist(s)	Kristóf Kollár; István Juhász	Hungary	1:40.74	
4	Gabriel Assunção; Jacky Godmann	Brazil	1:41.19	
5	Joan Moreno; Diego Domínguez	Spain	1:41.38	
6	Gabriele Casadei; Carlo Tacchini	Italy	1:41.60	
6	Henrikas Žustautas; Vadim Korobov	Lithuania	1:41.60	
8	Uladzislau Paleshko; Danila Verashchaka	Individual Neutral Athletes	1:42.44	
9	Nico Pickert; Conrad-Robin Scheibner	Germany	1:42.74	
