= 2024 ICF Canoe Sprint World Championships – Mixed C-4 500 metres =

Mixed C-4 500 metres at the 2024 ICF Canoe Sprint World Championships
- Venue: Rowing and Canoeing Race Course in Samarkand
- Location: Samarkand, Uzbekistan
- Dates: 24–25 August
- Competitors: 40 from 10 nations
- Winning time: 1:37.187

Medalists
| gold medal | Sofiia Shtil; Ekaterina Shliapnikova; Zakhar Petrov; Ivan Shtyl | Individual Neutral Athletes |
| silver medal | Anhelina Bardanouskaya; Uladzislau Paleshko; Vitali Asetski; Volha Klimava | Individual Neutral Athletes |
| bronze medal | Valéria Oliveira; Viktoriia Yarchevska; Manuel Fontán; Adrián Sieiro | Spain |

The mixed C-4 500 metres competition at the 2024 ICF Canoe Sprint World Championships in Samarkand took place in Rowing and Canoeing Race Course in Samarkand.

== Schedule ==
The schedule is as follows:

| Date | Time | Round |
|---|---|---|
| Saturday 24 August 2024 | 10:42 | Heats |
| Saturday 24 August 2024 | 17:30 | Semifinal |
| Sunday 25 August 2024 | 14:39 | Final A |

== Results ==
=== Heats ===
The fastest three boats in each heat advanced directly to the final.
The next four fastest boats in each heat, plus the fastest remaining boat advanced to the semifinal

==== Heat 1 ====
| Rank | Canoeist | Country | Time | Notes |
|---|---|---|---|---|
| 1 | Sofiia Shtil; Ekaterina Shliapnikova; Zakhar Petrov; Ivan Shtyl | Individual Neutral Athletes | 1:43.840 | QF |
| 2 | Virág Balla; Giada Bragato; Kristóf Kollár; István Juhász | Hungary | 1:45.806 | QF |
| 3 | Liudmyla Luzan; Valeriia Tereta; Taras Mazovskyi; Andrii Rybachok | Ukraine | 1:47.080 | QF |
| 4 | Xu Shengnan; Teng Anshuo; Wu Shengyue; Qu Xiangjie | China | 1:47.447 | QS |
| 5 | Arvind Verma; Parvinder Kaur; Masuma Yadav; Nepolian Ningthoujam | India | DSQ | |

==== Heat 2 ====
| Rank | Canoeist | Country | Time | Notes |
|---|---|---|---|---|
| 1 | Anhelina Bardanouskaya; Uladzislau Paleshko; Vitali Asetski; Volha Klimava | Individual Neutral Athletes | 1:43.744 | QF |
| 2 | Sergey Yemelyanov; Rufina Iskakova; Mariya Brovkova; Timofey Yemelyanov | Kazakhstan | 1:43.874 | QF |
| 3 | Mihai Chihaia; Maria Olărașu; Daniela Cociu; Oleg Tarnovschi | Moldova | 1:44.307 | QF |
| 4 | Valéria Oliveira; Viktoriia Yarchevska; Manuel Fontán; Adrián Sieiro | Spain | 1:53.959 | QS |
| 5 | Elyorjon Mamadaliev; Mukhammadali Mirismanov; Dilnoza Rakhmatova; Khamzoda Erkinova | India | DSQ | |

=== Semifinal ===
The fastest three boats advanced to the A final.

The race was not held

=== Final ===
Competitors raced for positions 1 to 9, with medals going to the top three.

| Rank | Canoeist | Country | Time |
|---|---|---|---|
| 1st place, gold medalist(s) | Sofiia Shtil; Ekaterina Shliapnikova; Zakhar Petrov; Ivan Shtyl | Individual Neutral Athletes | 1:37.187 |
| 2nd place, silver medalist(s) | Anhelina Bardanouskaya; Uladzislau Paleshko; Vitali Asetski; Volha Klimava | Individual Neutral Athletes | 1:38.694 |
| 3rd place, bronze medalist(s) | Valéria Oliveira; Viktoriia Yarchevska; Manuel Fontán; Adrián Sieiro | Spain | 1:39.753 |
| 4 | Sergey Yemelyanov; Rufina Iskakova; Mariya Brovkova; Timofey Yemelyanov | Kazakhstan | 1:40.035 |
| 5 | Virág Balla; Giada Bragato; Kristóf Kollár; István Juhász | Hungary | 1:40.318 |
| 6 | Mihai Chihaia; Maria Olărașu; Daniela Cociu; Oleg Tarnovschi | Moldova | 1:41.536 |
| 7 | Liudmyla Luzan; Valeriia Tereta; Taras Mazovskyi; Andrii Rybachok | Ukraine | 1:42.361 |
| 8 | Xu Shengnan; Teng Anshuo; Wu Shengyue; Qu Xiangjie | China | 1:44.315 |
