= Canoeing at the 2024 Summer Olympics – Men's C-2 500 metres =

Men's C-2 500 metres at the Games of the XXXIII Olympiad
- Venue: National Olympic Nautical Stadium of Île-de-France, Vaires-sur-Marne
- Dates: 6 August 2024 (heats and quarterfinals); 8 August 2024 (semifinals & finals)
- Competitors: 26 (13 boats) from 13 nations
- Winning time: 1:39.48

Medalists
1st place, gold medalist(s)		Liu Hao; Ji Bowen	China
2nd place, silver medalist(s)		Gabriele Casadei; Carlo Tacchini	Italy
3rd place, bronze medalist(s)		Joan Antoni Moreno; Diego Domínguez	Spain

The men's C-2 500 metres sprint canoeing event at the 2024 Summer Olympics took place on 6 and 8 August 2024 at the National Olympic Nautical Stadium of Île-de-France in Vaires-sur-Marne.

== Background ==
This was the 10th appearance of the event after it was introduced at the 1976 Olympics. The last time the event took place was at the 2008 Olympics, after which Men's C-2 1000 metres was introduced.

== Competition format ==
Sprint canoeing uses a four-round format for events with at least 11 boats, with heats, quarterfinals, semifinals, and finals. For a 13-boat event, the rounds are as follows:

- Heats: Two heats of 6 and 7 boats each. The top 2 boats in each heat (4 boats total) advance directly to the semifinals, with all others (9 boats) going to the quarterfinals.
- Quarterfinals: Two heats of 4 and 5 boats each. The top 3 boats in each heat (6 boats total) advance to the semifinals, with the remaining 3 boats out of medal contention and competing in the consolation Final B.
- Semifinals: Two heats of 5 boats each. The top 4 boats in each heat (8 boats total) advance to the medal Final A, with the remaining 2 boats out of medal contention and competing in consolation Final B.
- Finals: Final A consists of the top 8 boats, awarding the medals as well as 4th through 8th place. Final B features the remaining 5 boats, awarding 9th through 13th places.

The course is a flatwater course 9 metres wide. The name of the event describes the particular format within sprint canoeing. The "C" format means a canoe, with the canoeist kneeling and using a single-bladed paddle to paddle and steer (as opposed to a kayak, with a seated canoeist, double-bladed paddle, and foot-operated rudder). The "2" is the number of canoeists in each boat. The "500 metres" is the distance of each race.

== Schedule ==
All times are Central European Summer Time (UTC+2)

The event will be held over two days, with two rounds per day.

Date	Time	Round
6 August 2024	10:30; 13:50	Heats; Quarterfinals
8 August 2024	11:20; 13:20	Semifinals; Finals

== Results ==
=== Heats ===
Progression System: 1st-2nd to SF, rest to QF.

Heat 1

Rank	Lane	Canoer	Country	Time	Notes
1	8	Zakhar Petrov; Alexey Korovashkov	Individual Neutral Athletes	1:38.65	SF
2	4	Gabriele Casadei; Carlo Tacchini	Italy	1:39.17	SF
3	3	Jacky Godmann; Isaquias Queiroz	Brazil	1:39.38	QF
4	5	Balázs Adolf; Jonatán Hajdu	Hungary	1:40.02	QF
5	7	Ilie Sprîncean; Oleg Nuță	Romania	1:40.84	QF
6	6	Peter Kretschmer; Tim Hecker	Germany	1:41.58	QF
7	2	Max Brown; Grant Clancy	New Zealand	2:22.09	QF

Heat 2

Rank	Lane	Canoer	Country	Time	Notes
1	5	Liu Hao; Ji Bowen	China	1:37.40	SF, OB
2	6	Joan Antoni Moreno; Diego Domínguez	Spain	1:37.78	SF
3	4	Petr Fuksa; Martin Fuksa	Czech Republic	1:41.49	QF
4	3	Loïc Léonard; Adrien Bart	France	1:44.00	QF
5	7	Sergey Yemelyanov; Timur Khaidarov	Kazakhstan	1:45.94	QF
6	2	Manuel António; Benilson Sanda	Angola	1:51.53	QF

=== Quarterfinals ===
Progression System: 1st-3rd to SF, rest to Final B.

Quarterfinal 1

Rank	Lane	Canoer	Country	Time	Notes
1	5	Jacky Godmann; Isaquias Queiroz	Brazil	1:38.78	SF
2	3	Ilie Sprîncean; Oleg Nuță	Romania	1:40.00	SF
3	4	Loïc Léonard; Adrien Bart	France	1:45.24	SF
4	6	Manuel António; Benilson Sanda	Angola	1:49.00	FB
5	2	Max Brown; Grant Clancy	New Zealand	2:24.09	FB

Quarterfinal 2

Rank	Lane	Canoer	Country	Time	Notes
1	6	Peter Kretschmer; Tim Hecker	Germany	1:39.94	SF
2	4	Balázs Adolf; Jonatán Hajdu	Hungary	1:40.95	SF
3	5	Petr Fuksa; Martin Fuksa	Czech Republic	1:41.02	SF
4	3	Sergey Yemelyanov; Timur Khaidarov	Kazakhstan	1:44.03	FB

=== Semifinals ===
Progression: 1st-4th to Final A, rest to Final B.

Semifinal 1

Rank	Lane	Canoer	Country	Time	Notes
1	5	Zakhar Petrov; Alexey Korovashkov	Individual Neutral Athletes	1:39.57	FA
2	2	Balázs Adolf; Jonatán Hajdu	Hungary	1:39.83	FA
3	3	Jacky Godmann; Isaquias Queiroz	Brazil	1:39.95	FA
4	4	Joan Antoni Moreno; Diego Domínguez	Spain	1:40.23	FA
5	6	Loïc Léonard; Adrien Bart	France	1:40.98	FB

Semifinal 2

Rank	Lane	Canoer	Country	Time	Notes
1	5	Liu Hao; Ji Bowen	China	1:40.83	FA
2	6	Peter Kretschmer; Tim Hecker	Germany	1:41.58	FA
3	4	Gabriele Casadei; Carlo Tacchini	Italy	1:41.59	FA
4	2	Petr Fuksa; Martin Fuksa	Czech Republic	1:42.69	FA
5	3	Ilie Sprîncean; Oleg Nuță	Romania	1:43.42	FB

=== Finals ===
Final A

Rank	Lane	Canoer	Country	Time	Notes
1st place, gold medalist(s)	4	Liu Hao; Ji Bowen	China	1:39.48	
2nd place, silver medalist(s)	2	Gabriele Casadei; Carlo Tacchini	Italy	1:41.08	
3rd place, bronze medalist(s)	1	Joan Antoni Moreno; Diego Domínguez	Spain	1:41.18	
4	5	Zakhar Petrov; Alexey Korovashkov	Individual Neutral Athletes	1:41.27	
5	6	Peter Kretschmer; Tim Hecker	Germany	1:41.62	
6	3	Balázs Adolf; Jonatán Hajdu	Hungary	1:41.66	
7	8	Petr Fuksa; Martin Fuksa	Czech Republic	1:41.83	
8	7	Jacky Godmann; Isaquias Queiroz	Brazil	1:42.58	

Final B

Rank	Lane	Canoer	Country	Time	Notes
9	4	Ilie Sprîncean; Oleg Nuță	Romania	1:43.80	
10	5	Loïc Léonard; Adrien Bart	France	1:43.82	
11	3	Sergey Yemelyanov; Timur Khaidarov	Kazakhstan	1:46.75	
12	6	Manuel António; Benilson Sanda	Angola	1:55.74	
13	2	Max Brown; Grant Clancy	New Zealand	2:31.04	
