= 2025 ICF Canoe Sprint World Championships – Men's C-1 500 metres =

Men's C-1 500 metres at the 2025 ICF Canoe Sprint World Championships
- Venue: Idroscalo Regatta Course
- Location: Milan, Italy
- Dates: 20–22 August
- Competitors: 31 from 31 nations
- Winning time: 1:46.27

Medalists
gold medal	Zakhar Petrov	Individual Neutral Athletes
silver medal	Martin Fuksa	Czech Republic
bronze medal	Serghei Tarnovschi	Moldova

The men's C-1 500 metres competition at the 2025 ICF Canoe Sprint World Championships in Milan took place in Idroscalo Regatta Course.

== Schedule ==
The schedule is as follows:

Date	Time	Round
Wednesday 20 August 2025	09:00	Heats
Thursday 21 August 2025	13:30	Semifinals
Friday 22 August 2025	14:25	Final B
Friday 22 August 2025	15:04	Final A

== Results ==
=== Heats ===
The fastest six fastest boats (QS) in each heat plus the fastest three remaining boats (qs), advanced to the semi-finals.

==== Heat 1 ====
Rank	Canoeist	Country	Time	Notes
1	Martin Fuksa	Czech Republic	1:52.14	QS
2	Moritz Adam	Germany	1:54.08	QS
3	Ryo Naganuma	Japan	1:54.10	QS
4	Thomas Lambert	Great Britain	1:56.58	QS
5	Edward Surles	United States	1:58.44	QS
6	Sunil Singh Salam	India	1:59.58	QS
7	Ojay Fuentes	Philippines	2:00.55	qS
8	Shahriyor Daminov	Tajikistan	2:01.40	

==== Heat 2 ====
Rank	Canoeist	Country	Time	Notes
1	Dániel Fejes	Hungary	1:52.18	QS
2	Stefanos Dimopoulos	Greece	1:53.11	QS
3	Lai Kuan-chieh	Chinese Taipei	1:54.32	QS
4	Hwang Seon-hong	South Korea	1:54.94	QS
5	Loïc Léonard	France	1:55.71	QS
6	Daniel Pacheco	Colombia	1:59.56	QS
7	Sofiyanto Sofiyanto	Indonesia	2:01.48	qS
8	Vahe Davtyan	Armenia	2:29.01	

==== Heat 3 ====
Rank	Canoeist	Country	Time	Notes
1	Gabriel Assunção	Brazil	1:52.56	QS
2	Serghei Tarnovschi	Moldova	1:52.62	QS
3	Hleb Chabatarou	Individual Neutral Athletes	1:52.91	QS
4	Mattia Alfonsi	Italy	1:53.68	QS
5	Manuel Fontán	Spain	1:54.34	QS
6	Connor Fitzpatrick	Canada	1:55.36	QS
7	Pavlo Borsuk	Ukraine	1:56.04	qS
8	Manuel Antonio	Angola	2:08.79	

==== Heat 4 ====
Rank	Canoeist	Country	Time	Notes
1	Zakhar Petrov	Individual Neutral Athletes	1:55.58	QS
2	Cătălin Chirilă	Romania	1:56.27	QS
3	Kacper Sieradzan	Poland	1:56.41	QS
4	Pitpiboon Mahawattanangkul	Thailand	1:57.83	QS
5	Peter Kizek	Slovakia	2:00.13	QS
6	Joosep Karlson	Estonia	2:08.07	QS
7	Dario Maksimovic	Luxembourg	2:13.88	

=== Semifinals ===
The fastest three boats in each semi advanced to the A final. The next three fastest boats in each semi advanced to the final B.

==== Semifinal 1 ====
Rank	Canoeist	Country	Time	Notes
1	Martin Fuksa	Czech Republic	1:48.26	FA
2	Serghei Tarnovschi	Moldova	1:49.58	FA
3	Stefanos Dimopoulos	Greece	1:49.70	FA
4	Manuel Fontán	Spain	1:49.93	FB
5	Pavlo Borsuk	Ukraine	1:53.25	FB
6	Kacper Sieradzan	Poland	1:54.19	FB
7	Pitpiboon Mahawattanangkul	Thailand	1:55.47	
8	Edward Surles	United States	1:57.19	
9	Daniel Pacheco	Colombia	2:00.51	

==== Semifinal 2 ====
Rank	Canoeist	Country	Time	Notes
1	Dániel Fejes	Hungary	1:48.42	FA
2	Mattia Alfonsi	Italy	1:49.55	FA
3	Hleb Chabatarou	Individual Neutral Athletes	1:49.67	FA
4	Cătălin Chirilă	Romania	1:50.21	FB
5	Ryo Naganuma	Japan	1:50.40	FB
6	Thomas Lambert	Great Britain	1:52.58	FB
7	Loïc Léonard	France	1:53.44	
8	Joosep Karlson	Estonia	1:57.24	
9	Ojay Fuentes	Philippines	1:59.84	

==== Semifinal 3 ====
Rank	Canoeist	Country	Time	Notes
1	Zakhar Petrov	Individual Neutral Athletes	1:48.02	FA
2	Gabriel Assunção	Brazil	1:49.00	FA
3	Lai Kuan-chieh	Chinese Taipei	1:50.37	FA
4	Connor Fitzpatrick	Canada	1:50.42	FB
5	Moritz Adam	Germany	1:50.54	FB
6	Hwang Seon-hong	South Korea	1:51.71	FB
7	Peter Kizek	Slovakia	1:53.32	
8	Sofiyanto Sofiyanto	Indonesia	1:55.94	
9	Sunil Singh Salam	India	2:01.52	

=== Finals ===
==== Final B ====
Competitors in this final raced for positions 10 to 18.

Rank	Canoeist	Country	Time	Notes
1	Cătălin Chirilă	Romania	1:47.71	
2	Manuel Fontán	Spain	1:48.55	
3	Moritz Adam	Germany	1:49.47	
4	Connor Fitzpatrick	Canada	1:49.63	
5	Ryo Naganuma	Japan	1:50.23	
6	Hwang Seon-hong	South Korea	1:50.71	
7	Kacper Sieradzan	Poland	1:50.86	
8	Thomas Lambert	Great Britain	1:52.21	
9	Pavlo Borsuk	Ukraine	1:54.21	

==== Final A ====
Competitors raced for positions 1 to 9, with medals going to the top three.

Rank	Canoeist	Country	Time	Notes
1st place, gold medalist(s)	Zakhar Petrov	Individual Neutral Athletes	1:46.27	
2nd place, silver medalist(s)	Martin Fuksa	Czech Republic	1:46.71	
3rd place, bronze medalist(s)	Serghei Tarnovschi	Moldova	1:47.38	
4	Dániel Fejes	Hungary	1:47.57	
5	Gabriel Assunção	Brazil	1:48.53	
6	Stefanos Dimopoulos	Greece	1:48.73	
7	Lai Kuan-chieh	Chinese Taipei	1:49.85	
8	Mattia Alfonsi	Italy	1:55.58	
9	Hleb Chabatarou	Individual Neutral Athletes	1:53.15	
