= 2022 ICF Canoe Sprint World Championships – Men's C-4 500 metres =

Men's C-4 500 metres at the 2022 ICF Canoe Sprint World Championships
- Venue: Lake Banook
- Location: Dartmouth, Canada
- Dates: 7 August
- Competitors: 24 from 6 nations
- Winning time: 1:39.42

Medalists
gold medal	Joan Moreno; Pablo Graña; Manuel Fontán; Adrián Sieiro	Spain
silver medal	Aleksander Kitewski; Arsen Śliwiński; Wiktor Głazunow; Norman Zezula	Poland
bronze medal	Vitaliy Vergeles; Andrii Rybachok; Yurii Vandiuk; Taras Mishchuk	Ukraine

The men's C-4 500 metres competition at the 2022 ICF Canoe Sprint World Championships in Dartmouth took place on Lake Banook.

== Schedule ==
The schedule is as follows:

Date	Time	Round
Sunday 7 August 2022	12:38	Final

== Results ==
With fewer than ten boats entered, this event was held as a direct final.

Rank	Canoeist	Country	Time
1st place, gold medalist(s)	Joan Moreno; Pablo Graña; Manuel Fontán; Adrián Sieiro	Spain	1:39.42
2nd place, silver medalist(s)	Aleksander Kitewski; Arsen Śliwiński; Wiktor Głazunow; Norman Zezula	Poland	1:39.91
3rd place, bronze medalist(s)	Vitaliy Vergeles; Andrii Rybachok; Yurii Vandiuk; Taras Mishchuk	Ukraine	1:40.52
4	Dominik Zombori; Dávid Koczkás; Ádám Slihoczki; Kristóf Kollár	Hungary	1:43.32
5	Tyler Laidlaw; Alix Plomteux; Andrew Billard; Matthew O'Neill	Canada	1:44.12
	Peter Kretschmer; Fabien Schatz; Moritz Adam; Nico Pickert	Germany	DNS
