= 2026 ICF Canoe Sprint World Championships – Men's C-1 1000 metres =

Men's C-1 1000 metres at the 2026 ICF Canoe Sprint World Championships
- Location: Poznań, Poland
- Dates: 26–28 August
- Competitors: 34 from 34 nations
- Winning time: 4:07.44

Medalists
gold medal	Martin Fuksa	Czech Republic
gold medal	Dániel Fejes	Hungary
bronze medal	Zakhar Petrov	Individual Neutral Athletes

The men's C-1 1000 metres was held from 26 to 28 August 2026 at the 2026 ICF Canoe Sprint World Championships in Poznań, Poland.

36 canoeists entered of which 34 started.

== Records ==
Before the beginning of the event, the world best in the event was as follows:

Men's C-1 1000 metres
World Best	3:41.46	Zakhar Petrov	Neutral Athlete A	Szeged (HUN)
World Best	3:41.46	Martin Fuksa	Czech Republic	Szeged (HUN)

== Heats ==
Four heats were held on morning of 26 August 2026.

Qualification rule : First six in each heat (SF) plus three next fastest (qBT) qualify for semi-finals; remainder are eliminated.

Heat 1

Rank	Lane	Name(s)	Nation	Time	Behind	Notes
1	4	Wu Shengyue	China	4:02.77	–	SF
2	5	Martin Fuksa	Czech Republic	4:04.98	+2.21	SF
3	6	Zakhar Petrov	Neutral Athlete A	4:14.03	+11.26	SF
4	3	Loïc Léonard	France	4:23.12	+20.35	SF
5	9	Braulio Flores-Mateescu	Romania	4:24.89	+22.12	SF
6	7	Daniel Pacheco	Colombia	4:27.85	+25.08	SF
7	8	Gyaneshwor Singh Philem	India	4:33.00	+30.23	qBT
8	2	William Figueroa	Peru	4:51.16	+48.39	
9	1	Ibrahima Seck	Senegal	5:30.91	+1:28.14	

Heat 2

Rank	Lane	Name(s)	Nation	Time	Behind	Notes
1	4	Isaquias Queiroz	Brazil	4:13.84	–	SF
2	6	Pablo Crespo	Spain	4:15.67	+1.83	SF
3	5	Serghei Tarnovschi	Moldova	4:20.89	+7.05	SF
4	3	Pavlo Altukhov	Ukraine	4:24.31	+10.47	SF
5	7	Ryo Naganuma	Japan	4:25.94	+12.10	SF
6	1	Admilson Andre Batista De Sousa	São Tomé and Príncipe	4:47.45	+33.61	SF
7	2	Chen Tsung	Chinese Taipei	4:54.58	+40.74	qBT
8	9	Joaquim Lobo	Mozambique	5:02.38	+48.54	
9	8	Mohamed Ali Hmida	Tunisia	5:08.14	+54.30	

Heat 3

Rank	Lane	Name(s)	Nation	Time	Behind	Notes
1	7	Ivan Patapenka	Neutral Athlete B	4:10.65	–	SF
2	6	David Bauschke	Germany	4:11.36	+0.71	SF
3	5	Stefanos Dimopoulos	Greece	4:13.26	+2.61	SF
4	4	Wiktor Głazunow	Poland	4:19.14	+8.49	SF
5	3	Connor Fitzpatrick	Canada	4:21.29	+10.64	SF
6	9	Resul Aydın	Turkey	4:34.23	+23.58	SF
7	1	Mohamed Ali Merzougui	Algeria	4:58.17	+47.52	
-	8	Evans Monim	Indonesia	DNS		
-	2	Amirjon Bobojoniv	Tajikistan	DNS		

Heat 4

Rank	Lane	Name(s)	Nation	Time	Behind	Notes
1	4	Gabriele Casadei	Italy	4:05.58	–	SF
2	5	Dániel Fejes	Hungary	4:07.84	+2.26	SF
3	1	Diiorbek Mamatkulov	Uzbekistan	4:18.51	+12.93	SF
4	7	Preslav Georgiev	Bulgaria	4:21.32	+15.74	SF
5	8	Guillermo Quirino	Mexico	4:23.26	+17.68	SF
6	6	Jonathan Grady	United States	4:24.08	+18.50	SF
7	3	Thomas Lambert	Great Britain	4:28.50	+22.92	qBT
8	2	Mohamed Gouda	Egypt	4:38.65	+33.07	
9	9	Isyaka Muhammed Ibrahim	Nigeria	4:58.12	+52.54	

== Semifinals ==
Three semifinals were held.

The first three in each semi final progressed to the A final. The next three in each semi final progressed t the B final and the remainder wer eliminated.

Semifinal 1

Rank	Lane	Name(s)	Nation	Time	Behind	Notes
1	5	Wu Shengyue	China	4:20.01		FA
2	6	David Bauschke	Germany	4:21.55	+1.54	FA
3	4	Pablo Crespo	Spain	4:23.88	+3.87	FA
4	2	Connor Fitzpatrick	Canada	4:24.42	+4.41	FB
5	7	Preslav Georgiev	Bulgaria	4:30.71	+10.7	FB
6	9	Thomas Lambert	Great Britain	4:31.41	+11.4	FB
7	3	Diiorbek Mamatkulov	Uzbekistan	4:31.58	+11.57	
8	8	Braulio Nicolae Flores-Mateescu	Romania	4:44.67	+24.66	
9	1	Admilson Andre Batista De Sousa	São Tomé and Príncipe	5:10.10	+50.09	

Semifinal 2

Rank	Lane	Name(s)	Nation	Time	Behind	Notes
1	4	Dániel Fejes	Hungary	4:21.14		FA
2	5	Isaquias Queiroz	Brazil	4:23.65	+2.51	FA
3	6	Zakhar Petrov	Neutral Athlete A	4:24.87	+3.73	FA
4	3	Stefanos Dimopoulos	Greece	4:27.82	+6.68	FB
5	7	Wiktor Głazunow	Poland	4:29.11	+7.97	FB
6	8	Ryo Naganuma	Japan	4:35.42	+14.28	FB
7	9	Jonathan Grady	United States	4:35.75	+14.61	
8	2	Loïc Léonard	France	5:00.83	+39.69	
9	1	Gyaneshwor Singh Philem	India	5:01.33	+40.19	

Semifinal 3

Rank	Lane	Name(s)	Nation	Time	Behind	Notes
1	3	Serghei Tarnovschi	Moldova	4:22.00		FA
2	4	Ivan Patapenka	Neutral Athlete B	4:22.63	+0.63	FA
3	6	Martin Fuksa	Czech Republic	4:22.94	+0.94	FA
4	5	Gabriele Casadei	Italy	4:23.22	+1.22	FB
5	8	Resul Aydın	Turkey	4:37.45	+15.45	FB
6	2	Guillermo Quirino	Mexico	4:43.27	+21.27	FB
7	1	Daniel Pacheco	Colombia	4:43.87	+21.87	
8	7	Pavlo Altukhov	Ukraine	4:44.15	+22.15	
9	9	Chen Tsung	Chinese Taipei	5:25.57	+1:03.57	

== Finals ==
The A and B finals were held on the afternoon of 28 August.

B Final

Rank	Lane	Athlete	Nation	Time	Behind	Notes
1	4	Connor Fitzpatrick	Canada	4:26.54		
2	6	Gabriele Casadei	Italy	4:27.80	+1.26	
3	5	Stefanos Dimopoulos	Greece	4:28.17	+1.63	
4	7	Wiktor Głazunow	Poland	4:32.45	+5.91	
5	9	Thomas Lambert	Great Britain	4:35.48	+8.94	
6	2	Ryo Naganuma	Japan	4:40.17	+13.63	
7	8	Preslav Georgiev	Bulgaria	4:41.71	+15.17	
8	1	Guillermo Quirino	Mexico	4:43.42	+16.88	
9	3	Resul Aydın	Turkey	4:53.60	+27.06	

A Final

The first two finishers, Dániel Fejes and Martin Fuksa, could not be separated even on a photo finish, so both were awarded the gold medal. The third place finisher Zakhar Petrov was placed two hundredths of a second further back, and won the bronze.

Rank	Lane	Athlete	Nation	Time	Behind	Notes
1st place, gold medalist(s)	5	Dániel Fejes	Hungary	4:07.44		
1st place, gold medalist(s)	1	Martin Fuksa	Czech Republic	4:07.44		
3rd place, bronze medalist(s)	8	Zakhar Petrov	Neutral Athlete A	4:07.46	+0.02	
4	4	Serghei Tarnovschi	Moldova	4:08.74	+1.30	
5	7	Ivan Patapenka	Neutral Athlete B	4:09.56	+2.12	
6	9	Pablo Crespo	Spain	4:11.47	+4.03	
7	6	Wu Shengyue	China	4:12.01	+4.57	
8	2	David Bauschke	Germany	4:12.57	+5.13	
9	3	Isaquias Queiroz	Brazil	4:22.13	+14.69	
