= 2026 ICF Canoe Sprint World Championships – Men's C-4 500 metres =

Men's C-4 500 metres at the 2026 ICF Canoe Sprint World Championships
- Venue: Lake Malta
- Location: Poznań, Poland
- Dates: 26–29 August
- Competitors: 44 from 11 nations
- Teams: 11
- Winning time: 1:29.44

Medalists
| gold medal | Kristóf Kollár; István Juhász; Jonatán Hajdu; Dániel Fejes | Hungary |
| silver medal | Alexey Korovashkov; Aleksandr Bots; Dmitrii Sharov; Matvei Arsenov | Individual Neutral Athletes |
| bronze medal | Cayetano García; Pablo Martínez; Manuel Fontán; Diego Domínguez | Spain |

The men's C-4 500 metres competition at the 2026 ICF Canoe Sprint World Championships in Poznań, Poland took place on Lake Malta.

== Schedule ==
The schedule is as follows:

| Date | Time | Round |
|---|---|---|
| Wednesday 26 August 2026 | 14:52 | Heats |
| Friday 28 August 2026 | 11:13 | Semifinals |
| Saturday 29 August 2026 | 15:36 | Final A |

== Results ==
=== Heats ===
The results of the heats were as follows; the first three boats in each heat advanced straight to the final; the remaining boats advanced to the semi final.

Heat 1

| Rank | Lane | Nation | Athletes | Time | Gap | Notes |
|---|---|---|---|---|---|---|
| 1 | 3 | Spain | Cayetano García; Pablo Martínez; Manuel Fontán; Diego Domínguez | 1:39.27 | | FA |
| 2 | 5 | Germany | Florin Bange; Nico Pickert; Conrad-Robin Scheibner; Tim Hecker | 1:40.53 | +1.26 | FA |
| 3 | 4 | China | Xu Jian; Ji Bowen; Zhang Liwen; Yu Chenwei | 1:41.76 | +2.49 | FA |
| 4 | 7 | Ukraine | Volodymyr Savchyn; Pavlo Altukhov; Dmytro Ianchuk; Taras Kuzyk | 1:42.39 | +3.12 | SF |
| 5 | 6 | Czech Republic | Adam Rudolf; Petr Tettinger; Antonín Hrabal; Zbyněk Pták | 1:43.51 | +4.24 | SF |
| 6 | 2 | Lithuania | Danielius Gaurys; Dovydas Gaurys; Lukas Kybartas; Adas Stefanovič | 1:53.83 | +14.56 | SF |

Heat 2

| Rank | Lane | Nation | Athletes | Time | Gap | Notes |
|---|---|---|---|---|---|---|
| 1 | 5 | Hungary | Kristóf Kollár; István Juhász; Jonatán Hajdu; Dániel Fejes | 1:36.35 | | FA |
| 2 | 6 | Neutral Athletes A | Alexey Korovashkov; Aleksandr Bots; Dmitrii Sharov; Matvei Arsenov | 1:37.97 | +1.62 | FA |
| 3 | 4 | Poland | Aleksander Kitewski; Kacper Sieradzan; Łukasz Witkowski; Juliusz Kitewski | 1:39.29 | +2.94 | FA |
| 4 | 7 | Neutral Athletes B | Ilya Verashchaka; Ivan Patapenka; Uladzislau Paleshko; Danila Verashchaka | 1:45.57 | +9.22 | SF |
| 5 | 3 | Canada | Zachary Kralik; Connor Fitzpatrick; Eric Chouinard; Nikita Ciudin | 1:46.37 | +10.02 | SF |

=== Semifinal ===
The result of the semifinal was as follows; the first three boats qualified for the final, the remainder are eliminated.

| Rank | Lane | Nation | Athletes | Time | Gap | Notes |
|---|---|---|---|---|---|---|
| 1 | 5 | Ukraine | Volodymyr Savchyn; Pavlo Altukhov; Dmytro Ianchuk; Taras Kuzyk | 1:43.54 | | FA |
| 2 | 3 | Canada | Zachary Kralik; Connor Fitzpatrick; Eric Chouinard; Nikita Ciudin | 1:43.67 | +0.13 | FA |
| 3 | 4 | Neutral Athletes B | Ilya Verashchaka; Ivan Patapenka; Uladzislau Paleshko; Danila Verashchaka | 1:44.66 | +1.12 | FA |
| 4 | 6 | Czech Republic | Adam Rudolf; Petr Tettinger; Antonín Hrabal; Zbyněk Pták | 1:45.01 | +1.47 | |
| 5 | 2 | Lithuania | Danielius Gaurys; Dovydas Gaurys; Lukas Kybartas; Adas Stefanovič | 1:48.00 | +4.46 | |

=== Final ===
A Final

The results of the A final were as follows:

| Rank | Lane | Nation | Athletes | Time | Gap | Notes |
|---|---|---|---|---|---|---|
| 1st place, gold medalist(s) | 4 | Hungary | Kristóf Kollár; István Juhász; Jonatán Hajdu; Dániel Fejes | 1:29.44 | | |
| 2nd place, silver medalist(s) | 6 | Neutral Athletes A | Alexey Korovashkov; Aleksandr Bots; Dmitrii Sharov; Matvei Arsenov | 1:30.69 | +1.25 | |
| 3rd place, bronze medalist(s) | 5 | Spain | Cayetano García; Pablo Martínez; Manuel Fontán; Diego Domínguez | 1:30.97 | +1.53 | |
| 4 | 9 | Neutral Athletes B | Ilya Verashchaka; Ivan Patapenka; Uladzislau Paleshko; Danila Verashchaka | 1:31.13 | +1.69 | |
| 5 | 2 | Poland | Aleksander Kitewski; Kacper Sieradzan; Łukasz Witkowski; Juliusz Kitewski | 1:32.29 | +2.85 | |
| 6 | 3 | Germany | Florin Bange; Nico Pickert; Conrad-Robin Scheibner; Tim Hecker | 1:33.48 | +4.04 | |
| 7 | 1 | Canada | Zachary Kralik; Connor Fitzpatrick; Eric Chouinard; Nikita Ciudin | 1:33.51 | +4.07 | |
| 8 | 8 | Ukraine | Volodymyr Savchyn; Pavlo Altukhov; Dmytro Ianchuk; Taras Kuzyk | 1:33.91 | +4.47 | |
| 9 | 7 | China | Xu Jian; Ji Bowen; Zhang Liwen; Yu Chenwei | 1:43.19 | +13.75 | |
