= 2026 Canoe Sprint European Championships =

International canoeing and kayaking event

- Venue: Centro de Alto Rendimento de Montemor-o-Velho
- Location: Montemor-o-Velho, Portugal
- Dates: 10–14 June

The 2026 Canoe Sprint European Championships (36th) was held from 10 to 14 June 2026 in Montemor-o-Velho, Portugal.

== Canoe sprint ==
=== Medal table ===
* Host nation (Portugal)

Rank	Nation	Gold	Silver	Bronze	Total
1	Hungary	4	5	5	14
2	Ukraine	4	0	0	4
3	Spain	3	4	1	8
–	Individual Neutral Athletes	3	3	4	10
4	Germany	3	2	2	7
5	Czech Republic	2	1	1	4
6	Poland	1	3	3	7
7	Portugal*	1	1	1	3
8	Denmark	1	1	0	2
9	Moldova	1	0	0	1
10	Italy	0	2	2	4
11	Sweden	0	2	0	2
12	Greece	0	0	2	2
13	Slovenia	0	0	1	1
Totals (13 entries)		23	24	22	69

Source: Medal Table

=== Men ===
Event	Gold		Silver		Bronze	
C-1 200 m	Sergey Svinarev; Individual Neutral Athletes	38.279	Pablo Graña; Spain	38.354	Aliaksandr Zubok; Individual Neutral Athletes	38.769
C-1 500 m	Martin Fuksa; Czech Republic	1:45.367	Alexey Korovashkov; Individual Neutral Athletes	1:46.142	Stefanos Dimopoulos; Greece	1:46.967
C-1 1000 m	Martin Fuksa; Czech Republic	3:41.797 (EBT)	Zakhar Petrov; Individual Neutral Athletes	3:42.182	Stefanos Dimopoulos; Greece	3:43.687
C-1 5000 m	Serghei Tarnovschi; Moldova	23:06.332	Balázs Adolf; Hungary	23:19.199	Wiktor Głazunow; Poland	23:48.723
C-2 500 m	Zakhar Petrov; Ivan Shtyl; Individual Neutral Athletes	1:42.801	Manuel Fontán; Diego Domínguez; Spain	1:43.301	Dániel Fejes; Jonatán Hajdu; Hungary	1:43.816
K-1 200 m	Carlos Arévalo; Spain	34.103	Messias Baptista; Portugal	34.178	Gergely Balogh; Hungary	34.218
K-1 500 m	Alex Borucki; Poland	1:37.749	Josef Dostál; Czech Republic	1:38.029	Jacob Schopf; Germany	1:38.124
K-1 1000 m	Uladzislau Kravets; Individual Neutral Athletes	3:24.311	Bálint Kopasz; Hungary	3:25.011	Fernando Pimenta; Portugal	3:25.316
K-1 5000 m	Fernando Pimenta; Portugal	21:09.116	Mads Pedersen; Denmark	21:10.102	Samuel Baláž; Slovakia	21:12.850
K-2 500 m	Jacob Schopf; Max Lemke; Germany	1:30.921	Levente Kurucz; Bence Fodor; Hungary	1:31.806	Jakub Špicar; Daniel Havel; Czech Republic	1:32.016
K-4 500 m	Bence Nádas; Bence Fodor; Levente Kurucz; Sándor Tótka; Hungary	1:18.500 (EBT)	Max Rendschmidt; Max Lemke; Jacob Schopf; Tom Liebscher; Germany Adrian Del Rio; Carlos Arévalo; Marcus Cooper; Rodrigo Germade; Spain	1:18.630	Not awarded	

=== Women ===
Event	Gold		Silver		Bronze	
C-1 200 m	Liudmyla Luzan; Ukraine	43.710 (EBT)	Olympia Della Giustina; Italy	45.439	Dorota Borowska; Poland	45.504
C-1 500 m	Liudmyla Luzan; Ukraine	2:00.822 (EBT)	Olympia Della Giustina; Italy	2:03.347	Réka Opavszky; Hungary	2:03.981
C-1 5000 m	Zsófia Csorba; Hungary	27:06.548	Maryia Papichych; Individual Neutral Athletes	27:08.867	Carlotta Loske; Germany	27:09.299
C-2 200 m	Liudmyla Luzan; Anastasiia Rybachok; Ukraine	43.399	Àngels Moreno; Viktoriia Yarchevska; Spain	44.579	Milena Mackiewicz; Dorota Borowska; Poland	44.914
C-2 500 m	Liudmyla Luzan; Anastasiia Rybachok; Ukraine	2:00.787	Ágnes Kiss; Bianka Nagy; Hungary	2:02.507	Àngels Moreno; Viktoriia Yarchevska; Spain	2:03.707
K-1 200 m	Frederikke Moercke; Denmark	39.345	Anna Lucz; Hungary	40.329	Anja Apollonio; Slovenia	40.434
K-1 500 m	Pauline Jagsch; Germany	1:47.164 (EBT)	Anna Pulawska; Poland	1:48.004	Zsóka Csikós; Hungary	1:48.024
K-1 1000 m	Emese Kőhalmi; Hungary	3:56.731	Melina Andersson; Sweden	3:57.681	Lucrezia Zironi; Italy	3:59.511
K-1 5000 m	Emese Kőhalmi; Hungary	22:50.480	Melina Andersson; Sweden	22:51.363	Uladzislava Skryhanava; Individual Neutral Athletes	23:09.408
K-2 500 m	Paulina Paszek; Pauline Jagsch; Germany	1:45.896	Martyna Klatt; Anna Pulawska; Poland	1:46.426	Lucrezia Zironi; Giada Rossetti; Italy	1:46.856
K-4 500 m	Sara Ouzande; Lucía Val; Daniela Garcia; Bárbara Pardo; Spain	1:31.576	Sandra Ostrowska; Dominika Putto; Adrianna Kąkol; Katarzyna Kołodziejczyk; Poland	1:32.336	Marharyta Tkachova; Uladzislava Skryhanava; Ina Sauchuk; Nadzeya Kushner; Individual Neutral Athletes	1:32.651

=== Mixed ===
Event	Gold		Silver		Bronze	
C-4 500 m +	Spain; Antía Jácome; Viktoriia Yarchevska; Manuel Fontán; Diego Domínguez	1:38.098	Germany; Moritz Adam; Tim Hecker; Maike Jakob; Hedi Kliemke	1:38.158	Hungary; Zsófia Csorba; Réka Opavszky; Kristóf Kollár; Dániel Fejes	1:39.753
