= Wang Hao (canoeist) =

Chinese canoeist

Personal information
- Nationality: Chinese
- Born: 17 October 1993 (age 32)

Sport
- Country: China
- Sport: Sprint canoe
- Event: C-2 1000 m
Medal record
Men's canoe sprint
Representing China
World Championships
Gold medal – first place	2019 Szeged	C-2 1000 m
Asian Games
Gold medal – first place	2018 Jakarta–Palembang	C-2 1000 m
Asian Championships
Silver medal – second place	2017 Shanghai	C-2 1000 m
Silver medal – second place	2017 Shanghai	C-4 1000 m

Wang Hao (Chinese: 王浩; pinyin: Wáng Hào; born 17 October 1993) is a Chinese sprint canoeist.

He won a medal at the 2019 ICF Canoe Sprint World Championships.
