= Eléa Charvet =

French paracanoeist (born 2002)

Personal information
- Born: 26 July 2002 (age 23) Bayonne, France
- Home town: Sadirac, France

Sport
- Sport: Paracanoe
Medal record
Representing France
European Championships
| Bronze medal – third place | 2024 Szeged | VL3 |
| Bronze medal – third place | 2025 Racice | VL3 |
| Bronze medal – third place | 2026 Montemor-o-Velho | VL3 |

Eléa Charvet (born 26 July 2002) is a French paracanoeist who competes in international canoe competitions. She is a European bronze medalist and competed at the 2024 Summer Paralympics.

== Personal life ==
Charvet was involved in a traffic accident aged 18 which resulted in the loss of her left leg. She took up paracanoe in 2021 when she approached by "Comme les Autres" who introduced her to a sporting program organised the French Paralympic Committee.
