= Vitali Asetski =

Belarusian sprint canoeist

Personal information
- Nationality: Belarusian
- Born: 9 August 2000 (age 25)

Sport
- Country: Belarus
- Sport: Sprint canoe
- Event: C-4 500 m
Medal record
Men's canoe sprint
Representing Belarus
World Championships
Bronze medal – third place	2019 Szeged	C-4 500 m
Representing Authorised Neutral Athletes
World Championships
Silver medal – second place	2024 Samarkand	C-4 Mix 500 m

Vitali Asetski (Belarusian: Віталі Асецкі; born 9 August 2000) is a Belarusian sprint canoeist.

He won a medal at the 2019 ICF Canoe Sprint World Championships.

== Major results ==
=== Olympic Games ===
Year	C-1 200
2012	2nd place, silver medalist(s)

=== World championships ===
Year	C-2 500	C-2 1000	C-4 500	XC-2 200	XC-4 500
2019		DNF SF	3rd place, bronze medalist(s)	—N/a	—N/a
2021	6 SF		5	6	—N/a
2024	—N/a	DSQ SF	—N/a	—N/a	2nd place, silver medalist(s)
