= Canoeing at the 2010 Asian Games – Men's C-2 1000 metres =

Men's C-2 1000 metres at the 2010 Asian Games
- Venue: Guangzhou International Rowing Centre
- Date: 25 November 2010
- Competitors: 16 from 8 nations

Medalists
gold medal	Serik Mirbekov; Gerasim Kochnev	Uzbekistan
silver medal	Huang Maoxing; Xie Weiyong	China
bronze medal	Mikhail Yemelyanov; Timofey Yemelyanov	Kazakhstan

The men's C-2 1000 metres sprint canoeing competition at the 2010 Asian Games in Guangzhou was held on 25 November at the International Rowing Centre.

== Schedule ==
All times are China Standard Time (UTC+08:00)

Date	Time	Event
Thursday, 25 November 2010	12:30	Final

== Results ==
Legend

- DNF — Did not finish

Rank	Team	Time
1st place, gold medalist(s)	Uzbekistan (UZB); Serik Mirbekov; Gerasim Kochnev	3:34.248
2nd place, silver medalist(s)	China (CHN); Huang Maoxing; Xie Weiyong	3:34.289
3rd place, bronze medalist(s)	Kazakhstan (KAZ); Mikhail Yemelyanov; Timofey Yemelyanov	3:41.399
4	Japan (JPN); Taito Ambo; Naoya Sakamoto	3:44.181
5	Indonesia (INA); Anwar Tarra; Eka Octarorianus	3:52.673
6	Vietnam (VIE); Trần Văn Long; Lưu Văn Hoàn	3:53.145
7	India (IND); Ajit Kumar Sha; Prakant Sharma	4:20.217
—	Mongolia (MGL); Oyuunchimegiin Shükherbayar; Mukhaan Tümenjargal	DNF
