= Alexey Korovashkov =

Russian canoeist (born 1992)

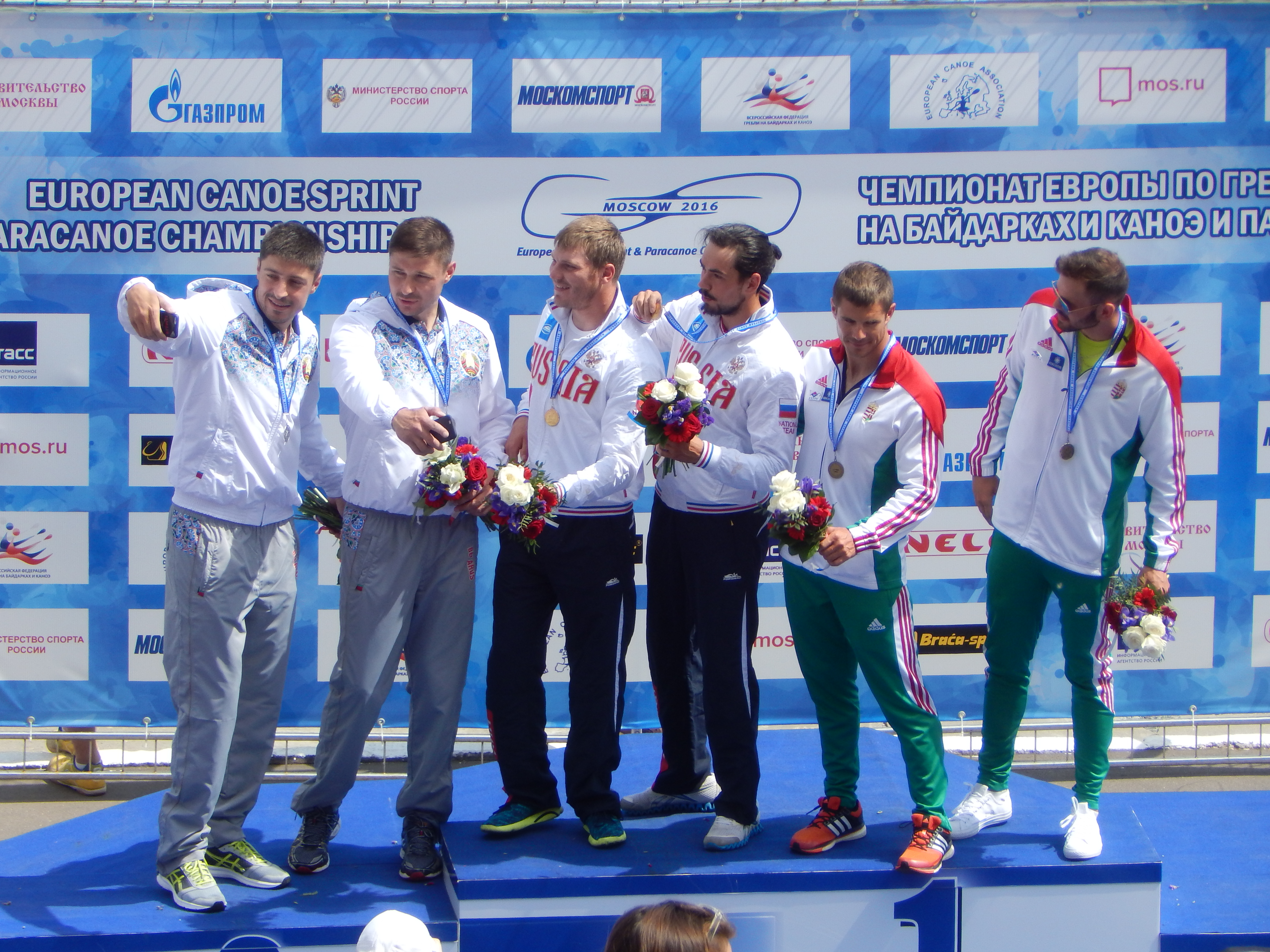
- Moscow 2016

Personal information
- Full name: Alexey Igorevich Korovashkov
- Born: 1 April 1992 (age 34) Stepnohirsk, Ukraine

Sport
- Country: Russia
- Sport: canoe
Medal record
Men's canoe sprint
Representing Russia
Olympic Games
Bronze medal – third place	2012 London	C-2 1000 m
World Championships
Gold medal – first place	2011 Szeged	C-1 4 x 200 m
Gold medal – first place	2014 Moscow	C-2 200 m
Gold medal – first place	2014 Moscow	C-2 500 m
Gold medal – first place	2014 Moscow	C-1 4 x 200 m
Gold medal – first place	2015 Milan	C-2 200 m
Silver medal – second place	2014 Moscow	C-1 200 m
European Championships
Gold medal – first place	2013 Montemor-o-Velho	C-2 500 m
Gold medal – first place	2013 Montemor-o-Velho	C-2 1000 m
Gold medal – first place	2014 Brandenburg	C-1 200 m
Gold medal – first place	2014 Brandenburg	C-2 200 m
Gold medal – first place	2014 Brandenburg	C-2 500 m
Gold medal – first place	2015 Račice	C-2 200 m
Gold medal – first place	2015 Račice	C-2 500 m
Gold medal – first place	2016 Moscow	C-2 1000 m
Silver medal – second place	2014 Brandenburg	C-2 1000 m
Silver medal – second place	2015 Račice	C-2 1000 m
Silver medal – second place	2017 Plovdiv	C-1 200 m
Representing ANA
World Championships
Gold medal – first place	2024 Samarkand	C-2 Mix 500 m
Silver medal – second place	2026 Poznań	C-4 500 m
European Championships
Gold medal – first place	2024 Szeged	C-2 200 m
Gold medal – first place	2024 Szeged	C-2 500 m
Silver medal – second place	2026 Montemor-o-Velho	C-1 500 m

Alexey Igorevich Korovashkov (Russian: Алексей Игоревич Коровашков; born 1 April 1992) is a Russian canoeist.

== Career ==
In 2011, he was part of the Russian team that won gold in the 4 x 200 m C-1 event at the sprint canoe World Championships, alongside Ivan Shtyl, Viktor Melantev, and Yevgeny Ignatov.

He has won a bronze medal at the 2012 Summer Olympics in the C-2 1000 m event.

In 2014, he won World gold in the C-2 200 m and 500 m with Shtyl, and regained the C-1 4 x 200 m title, this time with Shtyl, Andrey Kraitor and Nikolay Lipkin. He also won a silver in the individual 200 m.

At the 2015 Sprint Canoe World Championships, he won gold in men's C-2 200 m also with Shtyl.

In June 2015, he competed in the inaugural European Games, for Russia in canoe sprint, more specifically, Men's C-2 1000m. He earned a silver medal. At the 2015 European Championships, he won gold in the C-2 200 m and C-2 500 m (also with Shtyl), and silver in the C-2 1000 m with Ilya Pervukhin.

In 2016, he won gold in the C-2 1000 m at the European sprint championships, also with Pervukhin.

In 2017, he won silver in the C-1 200 m event at the European Championships.

He competed as a neutral athlete at the 2024 Olympics, finishing fourth in the C-2 500 m with Zakhar Petrov. That year, also as a neutral athlete, he won the mixed C-2 500 m event at the World Championships, with Ekaterina Shliapnikova. That year, he and Shtyl won gold in the C-2 500 m at the European Championships.

== Major results ==
=== Olympic Games ===
Year	C-2 500	C-2 1000
2012		3rd place, bronze medalist(s)
2024	4	

=== World championships ===
Year	C-1 200	C-2 200	C-2 500	C-2 1000	XC-2 500	C-1 4 × 200
2010				4	—N/a	
2011				5	—N/a	1st place, gold medalist(s)
2014	2nd place, silver medalist(s)	1st place, gold medalist(s)	1st place, gold medalist(s)		—N/a	1st place, gold medalist(s)
2015	4	1st place, gold medalist(s)			—N/a	—N/a
2017	4				—N/a	—N/a
2024		—N/a	—N/a		1st place, gold medalist(s)	—N/a
