= Canoeing at the 2018 Asian Games – Men's C-2 1000 metres =

Asian Games competition

Men's C-2 1000 metres at the 2018 Asian Games
- Venue: Jakabaring Lake
- Date: 30 August 2018
- Competitors: 18 from 9 nations

Medalists
| gold medal | Liu Hao; Wang Hao | China |
| silver medal | Sergey Yemelyanov; Timofey Yemelyanov | Kazakhstan |
| bronze medal | Nurislom Tukhtasin Ugli; Serik Mirbekov | Uzbekistan |

The men's sprint C-2 (canoe double) 1000 metres competition at the 2018 Asian Games was held on 30 August 2018.

== Schedule ==
All times are Western Indonesia Time (UTC+07:00)

| Date | Time | Event |
|---|---|---|
| Thursday, 30 August 2018 | 10:40 | Final |

== Results ==
| Rank | Team | Time |
|---|---|---|
| 1st place, gold medalist(s) | China (CHN); Liu Hao; Wang Hao | 3:39.825 |
| 2nd place, silver medalist(s) | Kazakhstan (KAZ); Sergey Yemelyanov; Timofey Yemelyanov | 3:41.893 |
| 3rd place, bronze medalist(s) | Uzbekistan (UZB); Nurislom Tukhtasin Ugli; Serik Mirbekov | 3:44.061 |
| 4 | Iran (IRI); Shahoo Nasseri; Ali Ojaghi | 3:49.265 |
| 5 | South Korea (KOR); Park Seung-jin; Choi Ji-sung | 3:56.083 |
| 6 | India (IND); Gaurav Tomar; Sunil Singh Salam | 3:56.477 |
| 7 | Japan (JPN); Hikaru Sato; Takanori Tome | 4:00.763 |
| 8 | Indonesia (INA); Anwar Tarra; Dedi Saputra | 4:11.561 |
| 9 | Tajikistan (TJK); Shahriyor Daminov; Mustafo Daminov | 4:41.997 |
