= 2024 Canoe Sprint European Championships =

International canoeing and kayaking event

- Venue: Maty-ér National Kayak and Rowing Olympic Centre
- Location: Szeged, Hungary
- Dates: 12–16 June

The 2024 Canoe Sprint European Championships (34th) was held from 12 to 16 June 2024 in Szeged, Hungary.

== Canoe sprint ==
=== Medal table ===
* Host nation (Hungary)

Rank	Nation	Gold	Silver	Bronze	Total
1	Hungary*	10	6	4	20
–	Individual Neutral Athletes	7	3	2	12
2	Poland	3	10	1	14
3	Portugal	2	1	1	4
4	Italy	2	0	2	4
5	Spain	1	2	3	6
6	Denmark	1	1	2	4
7	Ukraine	1	1	0	2
8	Moldova	1	0	3	4
9	Romania	1	0	0	1
10	Sweden	0	2	1	3
11	Czech Republic	0	1	1	2
12	Germany	0	1	0	1
12	Slovenia	0	1	0	1
14	Norway	0	0	3	3
15	Georgia	0	0	2	2
16	Austria	0	0	1	1
16	France	0	0	1	1
16	Lithuania	0	0	1	1
16	Serbia	0	0	1	1
Totals (19 entries)		29	29	29	87

=== Men ===
Event	Gold		Silver		Bronze	
C-1 200 m	Oleksii Koliadych; Poland	38.614	Pablo Graña; Spain	38.874	Zaza Nadiradze; Georgia	38.898
C-1 500 m	Serghei Tarnovschi; Moldova	1:50.432	Zakhar Petrov; Individual Neutral Athletes	1:50.442	Martin Fuksa; Czech Republic	1:51.248
C-1 1000 m	Cătălin Chirilă; Romania	4:03.010	Martin Fuksa; Czech Republic	4:03.254	Serghei Tarnovschi; Moldova	4:05.744
C-1 5000 m	Balázs Adolf; Hungary	22:35.300	Ivan Patapenka; Individual Neutral Athletes	22:40.889	Serghei Tarnovschi; Moldova	23:13.527
C-2 200 m	Individual Neutral Athletes; Alexey Korovashkov; Ivan Shtyl	37.438	Poland; Aleksander Kitewski; Oleksii Koliadych	37.758	Spain; Manuel Fontán; Adrián Sieiro	38.105
C-2 500 m	Individual Neutral Athletes; Alexey Korovashkov; Ivan Shtyl	1:42.228	Poland; Wiktor Głazunow; Arsen Śliwiński	1:42.404	Italy; Gabriele Casadei; Carlo Tacchini	1:42.584
C-2 1000 m	Italy; Gabriele Casadei; Carlo Tacchini	3:29.372	Germany; Moritz Adam; Nico Pickert	3:31.639	Moldova; Oleg Tarnovschi; Mihai Chihaia	3:31.826
K-1 200 m	Oleksandr Zaitsev; Ukraine	35.407	Jakub Stepun; Poland	35.435	Badri Kavelashvili; Georgia	35.441
K-1 500 m	Ádám Varga; Hungary	1:36.962	Fernando Pimenta; Portugal	1:38.222	Timon Maurer; Austria	1:38.365
K-1 1000 m	Aleh Yurenia; Individual Neutral Athletes	3:35.122	Bálint Kopasz; Hungary	3:35.492	Fernando Pimenta; Portugal	3:38.099
K-1 5000 m	Fernando Pimenta; Portugal	20:26.749	Ádám Varga; Hungary	20:27.290	Mads Pedersen; Denmark	20:27.434
K-2 200 m	Portugal; Iago Bebiano; Kevin Santos	31.580	Poland; Jakub Stepun; Przemysław Korsak	31.897	Hungary; Levente Kurucz; Márk Opavszky	32.013
K-2 500 m	Hungary; Bence Nádas; Sándor Tótka	1:30.434	Individual Neutral Athletes; Uladzislau Kravets; Dzmitry Natynchyk	1:31.154	Lithuania; Mindaugas Maldonis; Andrejus Olijnikas	1:32.351
K-2 1000 m	Italy; Samuele Burgo; Andrea Schera	3:11.133	Hungary; Bence Vajda; Tamás Szabó	3:11.680	France; Cyrille Carré; Étienne Hubert	3:13.484
K-4 500 m	Individual Neutral Athletes; Mikita Borykau; Uladzislau Kravets; Uladzislau Litvinau; Dzmitry Natynchyk	1:21.727	Poland; Jakub Stepun; Przemysław Korsak; Piotr Morawski; Sławomir Witczak	1:21.781	Italy; Manfredi Rizza; Tommaso Freschi; Francesco Lanciotti; Giovanni Penato	1:22.268
K-4 1000 m	Individual Neutral Athletes; Mikita Borykau; Uladzislau Kravets; Uladzislau Litvinau; Dzmitry Natynchyk	2:57.756	Hungary; Márk Opavszky; Balint Kollek; Hunor Hidvégi; Tamás Szabó	3:00.073	Spain; Alex Graneri; Roi Rodríguez; Pedro Vázquez; Íñigo Peña	3:01.013

=== Women ===
Event	Gold		Silver		Bronze	
C-1 200 m	Dorota Borowska; Poland	46.322	Antía Jácome; Spain	47.262	Yuliya Trushkina; Individual Neutral Athletes	47.712
C-1 500 m	Alena Nazdrova; Individual Neutral Athletes	2:02.749	Giada Bragato; Hungary	2:04.096	María Corbera; Spain	2:04.356
C-1 5000 m	Volha Klimava; Individual Neutral Athletes	26:02.860	Valeriia Tereta; Ukraine	26:21.898	Zsófia Kisbán; Hungary	26:41.366
C-2 200 m	Spain; Antía Jácome; María Corbera	44.976	Poland; Sylwia Szczerbińska; Dorota Borowska	45.356	Hungary; Ágnes Kiss; Bianka Nagy	45.442
C-2 500 m	Hungary; Ágnes Kiss; Bianka Nagy	2:00.490	Poland; Sylwia Szczerbińska; Dorota Borowska	2:00.574	Individual Neutral Athletes; Angelina Bardanouskaya; Volha Klimava	2:00.784
K-1 200 m	Anna Lucz; Hungary	39.543	Katarzyna Kołodziejczyk; Poland	40.280	Bolette Nyvang Iversen; Denmark	40.330
K-1 500 m	Tamara Csipes; Hungary	1:54.580	Emma Jørgensen; Denmark	1:56.530	Milica Novaković; Serbia	1:57.177
K-1 1000 m	Justyna Iskrzycka; Poland	3:52.701	Eszter Rendessy; Hungary	3:53.908	Melina Andersson; Sweden	3:54.355
K-1 5000 m	Emese Kőhalmi; Hungary	22:33.539	Melina Andersson; Sweden	22:34.641	Maria Virik; Norway	22:35.532
K-2 200 m	Hungary; Blanka Kiss; Anna Lucz	38.023	Slovenia; Mia Medved; Anja Osterman	38.166	Poland; Katarzyna Kołodziejczyk; Sandra Ostrowska	38.623
K-2 500 m	Denmark; Emma Jørgensen; Frederikke Mathiesen	1:45.804	Poland; Justyna Iskrzycka; Katarzyna Kołodziejczyk	1:45.911	Hungary; Alida Dóra Gazsó; Tamara Csipes	1:46.574
K-2 1000 m	Hungary; Noémi Pupp; Sára Fojt	3:55.154	Sweden; Melina Andersson; Julia Lagerstam	3:56.081	Norway; Maria Virik; Hedda Øritsland	3:56.217
K-4 500 m	Hungary; Noémi Pupp; Sára Fojt; Tamara Csipes; Alida Dóra Gazsó	1:35.168	Poland; Justyna Iskrzycka; Sandra Ostrowska; Julia Olszewska; Katarzyna Kołodziejczyk	1:36.388	Norway; Maria Virik; Anna Sletsjøe; Hedda Øritsland; Kristine Amundsen	1:37.151

== Paracanoe ==
=== Medal table ===
* Host nation (Hungary)

Rank	Nation	Gold	Silver	Bronze	Total
1	Ukraine	3	1	0	4
2	Spain	2	2	0	4
3	France	1	2	1	4
4	Hungary*	1	1	1	3
–	Individual Neutral Athletes	1	1	0	2
5	Great Britain	1	0	1	2
6	Portugal	1	0	0	1
7	Italy	0	1	2	3
8	Germany	0	1	1	2
8	Poland	0	1	1	2
10	Israel	0	0	2	2
11	Serbia	0	0	1	1
Totals (11 entries)		10	10	10	30

=== Medal events ===
Non-Paralympic classes

Event	Gold		Silver		Bronze	
Men's KL1	Rémy Boullé; France	49.572	Róbert Suba; Hungary	50.208	Esteban Farias; Italy	52.232
Men's KL2	Mykola Syniuk; Ukraine	43.454	Christian Volpi; Italy	44.188	Strahinja Bukvić; Serbia	44.788
Men's KL3	Juan Valle; Spain	40.646	Mateusz Surwiło; Poland	41.533	Ron Halevi; Israel	41.847
Men's VL1	Ilya Taupianets; Individual Neutral Athletes	1:08.275	David González; Spain	1:14.205	Moritz Berthold; Germany	1:18.346
Men's VL2	Norberto Mourão; Portugal	55.455	Andrii Kryvchun; Ukraine	55.605	Róbert Suba; Hungary	55.771
Men's VL3	Vladyslav Yepifanov; Ukraine	49.181	Abel Aber; France	51.415	Stuart Wood; Great Britain	51.622
Women's KL1	Maryna Mazhula; Ukraine	54.802	Edina Müller; Germany	55.952	Eleonora De Paolis; Italy	59.659
Women's KL2	Katalin Varga; Hungary	52.357	Anja Adler; Germany	53.781	Talia Eilat; Israel	58.035
Women's KL3	Araceli Menduiña; Spain	51.057	Nélia Barbosa; France	51.323	Katarzyna Kozikowska; Poland	51.420
Women's VL1	Viktoryia Pistis Shablova; Italy	1:24.125	Lillemor Köper; Germany	1:34.346	Esther Bode; Germany	1:48.204
Women's VL2	Ellen Field; Great Britain	1:04.283	Anastasia Miasnikova; Individual Neutral Athletes	1:06.130	Veronica Biglia; Italy	1:07.853
Women's VL3	Nataliia Lahutenko; Ukraine	59.058	María Jiménez; Spain	59.825	Eléa Charvet; France	1:01.148
