= Manuel Fontán =

Spanish canoeist (born 2001)

Personal information
- Full name: Manuel Fontán Señorans
- Born: 17 April 2001 (age 25) Pontevedra, Spain

Sport
- Country: Spain
- Sport: Canoe sprint
- Events: C–2 200 m, C–4 500 m
Medal record
Men's canoe sprint
Representing Spain
World Championships
Gold medal – first place	2022 Dartmouth	C-4 500 m
Gold medal – first place	2023 Duisburg	C-4 500 m
Silver medal – second place	2025 Milan	C-4 500 m
Bronze medal – third place	2024 Samarkand	C-4 Mix 500 m
Bronze medal – third place	2026 Poznań	C-4 500 m
European Championships
Gold medal – first place	2026 Montemor-o-Velho	C-4 Mix 500 m
Silver medal – second place	2026 Montemor-o-Velho	C-2 500 m
Bronze medal – third place	2024 Szeged	C-2 200 m

Manuel Fontán Señorans (born 17 April 2001) is a Spanish sprint canoeist.

== Career ==
Fontán competed at the 2022 ICF Canoe Sprint World Championships and won a gold medal in the C-4 500 metres with a time of 1:39.42. He competed at the 2023 ICF Canoe Sprint World Championships and again won a gold medal in the C-4 500 metres with a time of 1:30.808.

In August 2024, he competed at the 2024 ICF Canoe Sprint World Championships and won a bronze medal in the mixed C-4 500 metres. In August 2025, he competed at the 2025 ICF Canoe Sprint World Championships and won a silver medal in the C-4 500 metres with a time of 1:31.15.

In June 2026, he competed at the 2026 Canoe Sprint European Championships and won a gold medal in the mixed C-4 500 metres and a silver medal in the C-2 500 metres, along with Diego Domínguez. In August 2026, he competed at the 2026 ICF Canoe Sprint World Championships and won a bronze medal in the C-4 500 metres with a time of 1:30.97.
