= Canoeing at the 2026 Asian Games – Men's C-2 500 metres =

Men's C-2 500 metres at the 2026 Asian Games
- Venue: Miyoshi Lake
- Date: 24 September 2026
- Competitors: 18 from 9 nations

Medalists
gold medal	Wu Shengyue; Ji Bowen	China
silver medal	Artur Guliev; Vladlen Denisov	Uzbekistan
bronze medal	Sergey Yemelyanov; Timofey Yemelyanov	Kazakhstan

The men's sprint C-2 (canoe double) 500 metres competition at the 2026 Asian Games was held on 24 September 2026.

== Schedule ==
All times are Japan Standard Time (UTC+09:00)

Date	Time	Event
Thursday, 24 September 2026	12:00	Final

== Results ==
Rank	Athlete	Time	Notes
1st place, gold medalist(s)	China (CHN); Wu Shengyue; Ji Bowen	1:40.741	
2nd place, silver medalist(s)	Uzbekistan (UZB); Artur Guliev; Vladlen Denisov	1:42.878	
3rd place, bronze medalist(s)	Kazakhstan (KAZ); Sergey Yemelyanov; Timofey Yemelyanov	1:44.972	
4	Tajikistan (TJK); Mukhammadi Rajabov; Shahriyor Daminov	1:45.533	
5	Japan (JPN); Hikaru Sato; Shungo Yoshida	1:47.352	
6	Thailand (THA); Mongkhonchai Sisong; Pitpiboon Mahawattanangkul	1:48.584	
7	South Korea (KOR); Hwang Seon-hong; Kim Yi-yeol	1:49.389	
8	Indonesia (INA); Rudiansyah; Muh Burhan	1:50.199	
9	India (IND); Raju Rawat; Gyaneshwor Singh Philem	1:56.121	
