= Sergey Yemelyanov (canoeist) =

Kazakhstani canoeist (born 1995)

Personal information
- Born: 19 May 1995 (age 31) Zhezkazgan, Kazakhstan
- Home town: Shymkent, Kazakhstan
- Height: 1.80 m (5 ft 11 in)

Sport
- Country: Kazakhstan
- Sport: Canoeing
- Event: Sprint canoe
Medal record
Men's canoe sprint
Representing Kazakhstan
Asian Games
Silver medal – second place	2014 Incheon	C-1 1000 m
Silver medal – second place	2018 Jakarta-Palembang	C-2 1000 m
Bronze medal – third place	2026 Aichi–Nagoya	C-2 500 m
Bronze medal – third place	2026 Aichi–Nagoya	Mixed C-2 500 m
Asian Championships
Gold medal – first place	2017 Shanghai	C-2 1000 m
Gold medal – first place	2017 Shanghai	C-4 200 m
Gold medal – first place	2017 Shanghai	C-4 500 m
Gold medal – first place	2017 Shanghai	C-4 1000 m
Gold medal – first place	2022 Rayong	C-4 200 m
Gold medal – first place	2022 Rayong	C-4 500 m
Gold medal – first place	2022 Rayong	C-4 1000 m
Gold medal – first place	2024 Tokyo	C-2 500 m
Gold medal – first place	2024 Tokyo	Mixed C-2 500 m
Gold medal – first place	2025 Nanchang	Mixed C-2 500 m
Silver medal – second place	2011 Tehran	C-2 500 m
Silver medal – second place	2011 Tehran	C-2 1000 m
Silver medal – second place	2022 Rayong	C-2 1000 m
Silver medal – second place	2025 Nanchang	C-2 500 m
Bronze medal – third place	2015 Palembang	C-2 1000 m
Bronze medal – third place	2022 Rayong	C-1 500 m
Bronze medal – third place	2022 Rayong	C-2 200 m
Bronze medal – third place	2022 Rayong	C-2 500 m
Bronze medal – third place	2025 Nanchang	Mixed C-4 500 m

Sergey Yemelyanov (Сергей Емельянов, born 19 May 1995) is a Kazakhstani canoeist. He competed in the men's C-2 1000 metres (with Timofey Yemelyanov) and Men's C-1 1000 metres events for Kazakhstan at the 2020 Summer Olympics. Yemelyanov also competed for Kazakhstan at the 2024 Summer Olympics in the men's C-2 500 metres (with Bekarys Ramatulla) and men's C-1 1000 metres events.

His brothers are Olympic canoeists Mikhail Yemelyanov and Timofey Yemelyanov.
