= Dániel Fejes =

Hungarian canoeist (born 1999)

Personal information
- Nickname: Dani
- Born: 14 November 1999 (age 26) Budapest, Hungary
- Height: 178 cm (5 ft 10 in)
- Weight: 78 kg (172 lb)

Sport
- Sport: Canoe sprint
- Club: Budapesti Honved Sports Association
- Coached by: Pál Pétervári, István Demeter
Medal record
Men's canoe sprint
Representing Hungary
World Championships
Gold medal – first place	2025 Milan	C-4 500 m
Gold medal – first place	2026 Poznań	C-1 1000 m
Gold medal – first place	2026 Poznań	C-4 500 m
Silver medal – second place	2024 Samarkand	C-2 1000 m
European Championships
Bronze medal – third place	2022 Munich	C-2 1000 m
Bronze medal – third place	2026 Montemor-o-Velho	C-4 Mix 500 m
Bronze medal – third place	2026 Montemor-o-Velho	C-2 500 m

Dániel Fejes (born 14 November 1999) is a Hungarian canoeist. He competed in the men's C-2 1000 metres event at the 2020 Summer Olympics.

== Major results ==
=== Olympic Games ===
Year	C-1 1000	C-2 500	C-2 1000
2020	5 QF	—N/a	3 FB
2024	3 FB		—N/a

=== World championships ===
Year	C-1 500	C-2 1000	XC-2 500
2022	3 FB		6
2023	8	5	
2024	7 FB	2nd place, silver medalist(s)	
