= Diego Domínguez (canoeist) =

Spanish canoeist

Personal information
- Full name: Diego Domínguez Martín
- Nationality: Spanish
- Born: 4 May 2003 (age 23) Madrid, Spain

Sport
- Country: Spain
- Sport: Sprint canoe
Medal record
Men's canoe sprint
Representing Spain
Olympic Games
Bronze medal – third place	2024 Paris	C-2 500m
World Championships
Bronze medal – third place	2026 Poznań	C-4 500 m
European Championships
Gold medal – first place	2026 Montemor-o-Velho	C-4 Mix 500 m
Silver medal – second place	2026 Montemor-o-Velho	C-2 500 m

Diego Domínguez Martín (Note: In this Spanish name, the first or paternal surname is Domínguez and the second or maternal family name is Martín.) (born 4 May 2003) is a Spanish sprint canoeist. He won bronze at the 2024 Summer Olympics in the C-2 500m event.
