= Adrián Sieiro =

Spanish canoeist (born 1992)

Personal information
- Full name: Adrián Sieiro Barreiro
- Born: 7 December 1992 (age 33)

Sport
- Country: Spain
- Sport: Canoe sprint
- Events: C–2 500 m, C–4 500 m
Medal record
Men's canoe sprint
Representing Spain
World Championships
Gold medal – first place	2022 Dartmouth	C-4 500 m
Gold medal – first place	2023 Duisburg	C-4 500 m
Silver medal – second place	2025 Milan	C-4 500 m
Bronze medal – third place	2024 Samarkand	C-4 Mix 500 m
European Championships
Gold medal – first place	2022 Munich	C-2 500 m
Gold medal – first place	2025 Racice	C-4 Mix 500 m
Silver medal – second place	2025 Racice	C-2 500 m
Bronze medal – third place	2018 Belgrade	C-2 1000 m
Bronze medal – third place	2024 Szeged	C-2 200 m

Adrián Sieiro Barreiro (Note: In this Spanish name, the first or paternal surname is Sieiro and the second or maternal family name is Barreiro.) (born 7 December 1992) is a Spanish sprint canoeist.

== Career ==
Sieiro competed at the 2022 ICF Canoe Sprint World Championships and won a gold medal in the C-4 500 metres with a time of 1:39.42. He competed at the 2023 ICF Canoe Sprint World Championships and again won a gold medal in the C-4 500 metres with a time of 1:30.808. In August 2024, he competed at the 2024 ICF Canoe Sprint World Championships and won a bronze medal in the mixed C-4 500 metres.

In June 2025, he competed at the 2025 Canoe Sprint European Championships and won a gold medal in the mixed C-4 500 metres and a silver medal in the C-2 500 metres event. In August 2025, he competed at the 2025 ICF Canoe Sprint World Championships and won a silver medal in the C-4 500 metres with a time of 1:31.15.
