= Daniela García =

Daniela García may refer to:

- Daniela Garcia (politician)
- Daniela García (athlete)
- Daniela García (footballer)

== See also ==
- Daniel García (disambiguation)
