= Aleksander Kitewski =

Polish canoeist

Personal information
- Nationality: Polish
- Born: 14 February 1996 (age 30)

Sport
- Country: Poland
- Sport: Canoe sprint
Medal record
Men's canoe sprint
Representing Poland
World Championships
| Silver medal – second place | 2021 Copenhagen | C-4 500 m |
| Silver medal – second place | 2022 Dartmouth | C-4 500 m |
| Silver medal – second place | 2023 Duisburg | C-4 500 m |
| Bronze medal – third place | 2022 Dartmouth | C-2 Mix 500 m |
European Games
| Silver medal – second place | 2023 Kraków–Małopolska | C-2 Mix 200 m |
| Bronze medal – third place | 2023 Kraków–Małopolska | C-2 500 m |
European Championships
| Gold medal – first place | 2022 Munich | C-2 200 m |
| Silver medal – second place | 2024 Szeged | C-2 200 m |

Aleksander Kitewski (born 14 February 1996) is a Polish sprint canoeist.

He competed at the 2021 ICF Canoe Sprint World Championships, winning a silver medal in the C-4 500 m distance.
