= Jacky Godmann =

Brazilian canoeist

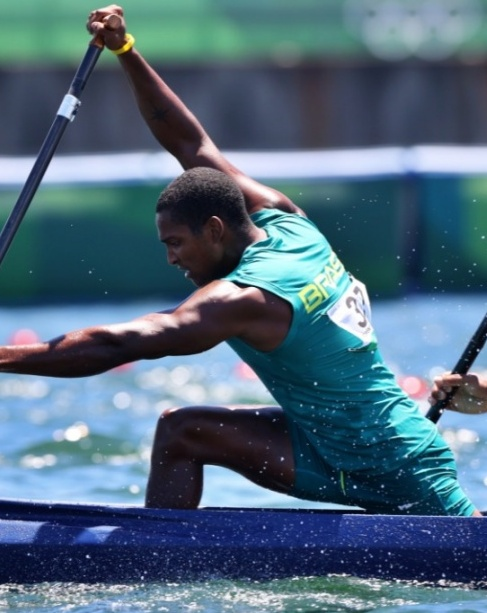
- Godmann at the 2020 Summer Olympics

Personal information
- Full name: Jacky Jamael Nascimento Godmann
- Born: 14 April 1999 (age 27) Itacaré, Brazil
- Height: 174 cm (5 ft 9 in)
- Weight: 74 kg (163 lb)

Sport
- Sport: Canoe sprint
Medal record
World Championships
Silver medal – second place	2026 Poznań	C-2 500 m
South American Games
Silver medal – second place	2026 Santa Fe	C-2 500 m

Jacky Jamael Nascimento Godmann (born 14 April 1999) is a Brazilian canoeist. His family has a tradition in the sport, with uncle Vilson Nascimento winning a two medals in the 2007 Pan American Games, and his aunt Valdenice do Nascimento getting a bronze medal in the 2015 edition. He competed in the men's C-2 1000 metres event at the 2020 Summer Olympics alongside Isaquias Queiroz as a replacement for Queiroz's usual partner Erlon Silva, finishing in fourth place. In the same C-1 1000 meters race that Queiroz got the gold medal, Godmann went to the quarterfinals. He also competed for Brazil at the 2024 Summer Olympics.
