= Zakhar Petrov =

Russian canoeist (born 2002)

Personal information
- Born: 13 May 2002 (age 24)
- Home town: Ryazan, Russia

Sport
- Country: Russia
- Sport: Canoe sprint
- Events: C–1 500 m, C–2 1000 m
Medal record
Men's canoe sprint
Representing ANA
World Championships
Gold medal – first place	2024 Samarkand	C-2 1000 m
Gold medal – first place	2024 Samarkand	C-1 500 m
Gold medal – first place	2024 Samarkand	C-4 Mix 500 m
Gold medal – first place	2025 Milan	C-1 500 m
Gold medal – first place	2025 Milan	C-2 500 m
Gold medal – first place	2026 Poznań	C-2 500 m
Bronze medal – third place	2026 Poznań	C-1 1000 m
European Championships
Gold medal – first place	2026 Montemor-o-Velho	C-2 500 m
Silver medal – second place	2024 Szeged	C-1 500 m
Silver medal – second place	2026 Montemor-o-Velho	C-1 1000 m

Zakhar Petrov (Захар Петров, born 13 May 2002) is a Russian canoeist. He represented Individual Neutral Athletes at the 2024 Summer Olympics.

== Career ==
Petrov competed at the 2024 European Canoe Sprint Qualifier in Szeged, Hungary and won the C–1 1000 metres, and qualified to represent Individual Neutral Athletes at the 2024 Summer Olympics. He finished in fourth place in the C-2 500 metres and C-1 1000 metres events.

In June 2024, he competed at the 2024 Canoe Sprint European Championships and won a silver medal in the C-1 500 metres event with a time of 1:50.442. In August 2024, he competed at the 2024 ICF Canoe Sprint World Championships and won a gold medal in the C–2 1000 metres event with a time of 3:41.510.

== Major results ==
=== Olympic Games ===
Year	C-1 1000	C-2 500
2024	4	4

=== World championships ===
Year	C-1 500	C-2 1000	XC-4 500
2024	DNF FA	1st place, gold medalist(s)	1st place, gold medalist(s)
