= Ivan Shtyl =

Russian sprint canoeist (born 1986)

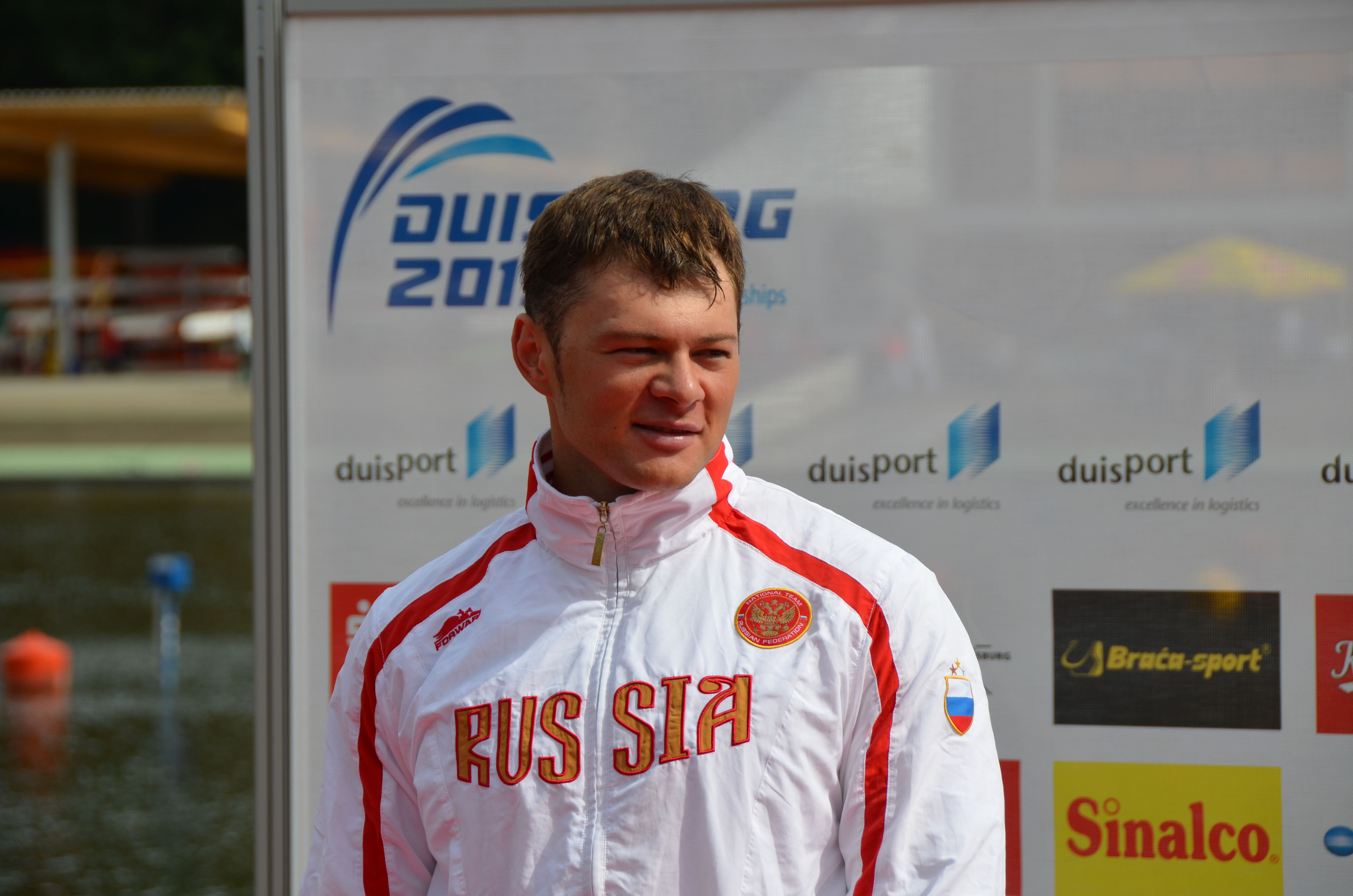

Personal information
- Nationality: Russian
- Born: 6 August 1986 (age 40) Komsomolsk-on-Amur, Khabarovsk Krai, Russian SFSR
- Height: 1.80 m (5 ft 11 in)
- Weight: 86 kg (190 lb)

Sport
- Country: Russia
- Sport: Canoe sprint
Medal record
Men's canoe sprint
Representing Russia
Olympic Games
| Silver medal – second place | 2012 London | C-1 200 m |
World Championships
| Gold medal – first place | 2006 Szeged | C-2 200 m |
| Gold medal – first place | 2007 Duisburg | C-2 200 m |
| Gold medal – first place | 2009 Dartmouth | C-1 4 x 200 m |
| Gold medal – first place | 2010 Poznań | C-1 200 m |
| Gold medal – first place | 2010 Poznań | C-1 4 x 200 m |
| Gold medal – first place | 2011 Szeged | C-1 4 x 200 m |
| Gold medal – first place | 2013 Duisburg | C-1 4 x 200 m |
| Gold medal – first place | 2013 Duisburg | C-2 500 m |
| Gold medal – first place | 2014 Moscow | C-2 200 m |
| Gold medal – first place | 2014 Moscow | C-2 500 m |
| Gold medal – first place | 2014 Moscow | C-1 4 x 200 m |
| Gold medal – first place | 2015 Milan | C-2 200 m |
| Gold medal – first place | 2017 Račice | C-2 200 m |
| Gold medal – first place | 2017 Račice | C-2 500 m |
| Gold medal – first place | 2018 Montemor-o-Velho | C-4 500 m |
| Gold medal – first place | 2019 Szeged | C-4 500 m |
| Gold medal – first place | 2021 Copenhagen | C-2 Mix 200 m |
| Gold medal – first place | 2025 Milan | C-2 500 m |
| Silver medal – second place | 2007 Duisburg | C-4 200 m |
| Silver medal – second place | 2009 Dartmouth | C-2 200 m |
| Silver medal – second place | 2009 Dartmouth | C-2 500 m |
| Silver medal – second place | 2010 Poznań | C-2 200 m |
| Silver medal – second place | 2011 Szeged | C-1 200 m |
| Silver medal – second place | 2013 Duisburg | C-1 200 m |
| Silver medal – second place | 2018 Montemor-o-Velho | C-1 200 m |
| Bronze medal – third place | 2018 Montemor-o-Velho | C-2 200 m |
| Bronze medal – third place | 2021 Copenhagen | C-4 500 m |
European Championships
| Gold medal – first place | 2006 Račice | C-2 200 m |
| Gold medal – first place | 2007 Pontevedra | C-4 200 m |
| Gold medal – first place | 2008 Milan | C-4 200 m |
| Gold medal – first place | 2009 Brandenburg | C-1 4 x 200 m |
| Gold medal – first place | 2013 Montemor-o-Velho | C-2 500 m |
| Gold medal – first place | 2014 Brandenburg | C-2 200 m |
| Gold medal – first place | 2014 Brandenburg | C-2 500 m |
| Gold medal – first place | 2016 Moscow | C-2 500 m |
| Gold medal – first place | 2017 Plovdiv | C-2 200 m |
| Gold medal – first place | 2017 Plovdiv | C-2 500 m |
| Gold medal – first place | 2018 Belgrade | C-2 200 m |
| Gold medal – first place | 2018 Belgrade | C-4 500 m |
| Silver medal – second place | 2007 Pontevedra | C-2 200 m |
| Silver medal – second place | 2008 Milan | C-2 200 m |
| Silver medal – second place | 2009 Brandenburg | C-1 200 m |
| Silver medal – second place | 2009 Brandenburg | C-2 200 m |
| Silver medal – second place | 2010 Trasona | C-2 200 m |
| Silver medal – second place | 2018 Belgrade | C-1 200 m |
| Bronze medal – third place | 2010 Trasona | C-1 200 m |
Universiade
| Gold medal – first place | 2013 Kazan | C-2 200 m |
| Gold medal – first place | 2013 Kazan | C-2 500 m |
Representing ANA
World Championships
| Gold medal – first place | 2024 Samarkand | C-4 Mix 500 m |
| Gold medal – first place | 2026 Poznań | C-2 500 m |
European Championships
| Gold medal – first place | 2024 Szeged | C-2 200 m |
| Gold medal – first place | 2024 Szeged | C-2 500 m |
| Gold medal – first place | 2026 Montemor-o-Velho | C-2 500 m |

Ivan Aleksandrovich Shtyl (Russian: Иван Александрович Штыль; born 6 August 1986) is a Russian sprint canoeist who has competed since 2004.

== Career ==
Shtyl won 26 medals at the ICF Canoe Sprint World Championships with 18 gold and 7 silver. He also won an Olympic bronze medal at the 2012 Summer Olympics in the men's C-1 200 m. After the original silver medalist, Jevgenij Shuklin of Lithuania, was disqualified due to doping, Ivan was eventually awarded the silver medal in 2021.

== Major results ==
=== Olympic Games ===
| Year | C-1 200 |
|---|---|
| 2012 | 2nd place, silver medalist(s) |

=== World championships ===
| Year | C-1 200 | C-2 200 | C-2 500 | C-4 200 | C-4 500 | XC-2 200 | XC-4 500 | C-1 4 × 200 |
|---|---|---|---|---|---|---|---|---|
| 2006 | | 1st place, gold medalist(s) | | | 4 | —N/a | —N/a | —N/a |
| 2007 | | 1st place, gold medalist(s) | | 2nd place, silver medalist(s) | | —N/a | —N/a | —N/a |
| 2009 | | 2nd place, silver medalist(s) | 2nd place, silver medalist(s) | | —N/a | —N/a | —N/a | 1st place, gold medalist(s) |
| 2010 | 1st place, gold medalist(s) | 2nd place, silver medalist(s) | | —N/a | —N/a | —N/a | —N/a | 1st place, gold medalist(s) |
| 2011 | 2nd place, silver medalist(s) | | 5 | —N/a | —N/a | —N/a | —N/a | 1st place, gold medalist(s) |
| 2013 | 2nd place, silver medalist(s) | | 1st place, gold medalist(s) | —N/a | —N/a | —N/a | —N/a | 1st place, gold medalist(s) |
| 2014 | | 1st place, gold medalist(s) | 1st place, gold medalist(s) | —N/a | —N/a | —N/a | —N/a | 1st place, gold medalist(s) |
| 2015 | | 1st place, gold medalist(s) | | —N/a | —N/a | —N/a | —N/a | —N/a |
| 2017 | | 1st place, gold medalist(s) | 1st place, gold medalist(s) | —N/a | —N/a | —N/a | —N/a | —N/a |
| 2018 | 2nd place, silver medalist(s) | 3rd place, bronze medalist(s) | | —N/a | 1st place, gold medalist(s) | —N/a | —N/a | —N/a |
| 2019 | | 6 | | —N/a | 1st place, gold medalist(s) | —N/a | —N/a | —N/a |
| 2021 | | | | —N/a | 3rd place, bronze medalist(s) | 1st place, gold medalist(s) | —N/a | —N/a |
| 2024 | | —N/a | —N/a | —N/a | —N/a | —N/a | 1st place, gold medalist(s) | —N/a |
