= Joan Moreno =

Spanish canoeist

Personal information
- Nationality: Spanish
- Born: Joan Antoni Moreno; 4 April 2000 (age 26)

Sport
- Country: Spain
- Sport: Sprint canoe
Medal record
Men's canoe sprint
Representing Spain
Olympic Games
Bronze medal – third place	2024 Paris	C-2 500 m
World Championships
Gold medal – first place	2022 Dartmouth	C-4 500 m
Gold medal – first place	2023 Duisburg	C-4 500 m
Silver medal – second place	2023 Duisburg	C-1 200 m
European Championships
Gold medal – first place	2021 Poznań	C-1 200 m
Gold medal – first place	2022 Munich	C-2 500 m

Joan Antoni Moreno (born 4 April 2000) is a Spanish sprint canoeist. He won bronze at the 2024 Summer Olympics in the C-2 500m event.
