= Gabriele Casadei =

Italian canoeist (born 2002)

Personal information
- Born: 10 August 2002 (age 24) Turin, Italy

Sport
- Country: Italy
- Sport: Sprint canoe
Medal record
Men's canoe sprint
Representing Italy
Olympic Games
Silver medal – second place	2024 Paris	C-2 500m
European Games
Gold medal – first place	2023 Kraków-Małopolska	C-2 500m
European Championships
Gold medal – first place	2023 Kraków	C-2 500 m
Gold medal – first place	2024 Szeged	C-2 1000 m
Gold medal – first place	2025 Racice	C-2 500 m
Bronze medal – third place	2024 Szeged	C-2 500 m

Gabriele Casadei (born 10 August 2002) is an Italian sprint canoeist. He won silver at the 2024 Summer Olympics in the C-2 500m event.
