= Kristóf Kollár =

Hungarian canoeist (born 2001)

Personal information
- Born: 18 October 2001 (age 24)

Sport
- Country: Hungary
- Sport: Canoe sprint
- Events: C–2 500 m, C–4 500 m
Medal record
Men's canoe sprint
Representing Hungary
World Championships
Gold medal – first place	2025 Milan	C-4 500 m
Gold medal – first place	2026 Poznań	C-4 500 m
Bronze medal – third place	2025 Milan	C-2 500 m
Bronze medal – third place	2026 Poznań	C-2 500 m
European Championships
Silver medal – second place	2025 Racice	C-4 Mix 500 m
Bronze medal – third place	2025 Racice	C–2 500 m
Bronze medal – third place	2026 Montemor-o-Velho	C-4 Mix 500 m

Kristóf Kollár (born 18 October 2001) is a Hungarian sprint canoeist.

== Career ==
In June 2025, Kollár competed at the 2025 Canoe Sprint European Championships and won a silver medal in the mixed C-4 500 metres and a bronze medal in the C–2 500 metres event, along with István Juhász. In August 2025, he competed at the 2025 ICF Canoe Sprint World Championships and won a gold medal in the C-4 500 metres.
