= 2026 ICF Canoe Sprint World Championships =

Canoeing competition in Poznań, Poland

- Venue: Lake Malta (Maltánski Reservoir)
- Location: Poznań, Poland
- Dates: 26–30 August

The 2026 ICF Canoe Sprint World Championships were held from 26 to 30 August 2026 on Lake Malta, in Poznań, Poland. The event included both a fully integrated para canoe schedule of Paralympic Games events in both KL (Kayak) and VL (Va'a/outrigger) classifications, and a series of Special Olympics class (SO) races for canoeists with intellectual impairment.

== Medal summary ==
=== Medal table ===
* Host nation (Poland)

Rank	Nation	Gold	Silver	Bronze	Total
1	Germany	5	0	2	7
2	Hungary	4	7	1	12
3	Australia	2	1	2	5
3	China	2	1	2	5
5	Portugal	2	1	1	4
6	Czech Republic	1	1	3	5
7	AIN-A	1	1	1	3
7	Canada	1	1	1	3
9	Brazil	1	1	0	2
9	Ukraine	1	1	0	2
11	AIN-B	1	0	4	5
12	Denmark	1	0	2	3
12	Poland*	1	0	2	3
14	Italy	1	0	0	1
14	Sweden	1	0	0	1
16	Spain	0	3	3	6
17	Uzbekistan	0	2	0	2
18	New Zealand	0	1	0	1
18	Serbia	0	1	0	1
18	South Africa	0	1	0	1
21	United States	0	0	1	1
Totals (21 entries)		25	23	25	73

- AIN-A & AIN-B refers to Individual neutral athletes A and Individual neutral athletes B, the designations allowing for athletes from Russia (AIN-A) and Belarus (AIN-B) to compete.

=== Men ===
==== Canoe ====
Event	Gold		Silver		Bronze	
C–1 200 m	Oleksii Koliadych; Poland	40.95	Artur Guliev; Uzbekistan	41.05	Andrei Zholabau; AIN-B	41.15
C–1 500 m	Isaquias Queiroz; Brazil	1:46.08	Martin Fuksa; Czech Republic	1:46.32	Ji Bowen; China	1:47.10
C–1 1000 m	Dániel Fejes; Hungary Martin Fuksa; Czech Republic	4:07.44	None awarded		Zakhar Petrov; AIN-A	4:07.46
C–1 5000 m	Balázs Adolf; Hungary	27:16.73	Jaime Duro; Spain	27:47.15	Robin Hirsch; Czech Republic	28:18.58
C–2 500 m	AIN-A; Zakhar Petrov; Ivan Shtyl	1:39.23	Brazil; Gabriel Assunção; Jacky Godmann	1:39.81	Hungary; Kristóf Kollár; István Juhász	1:40.03
C–4 500 m	Hungary; Kristóf Kollár; István Juhász; Jonatán Hajdu; Dániel Fejes	1:29.44	AIN-A; Alexey Korovashkov; Aleksandr Bots; Dmitrii Sharov; Matvei Arsenov	1:30.69	Spain; Cayetano García; Pablo Martínez; Manuel Fontán; Diego Domínguez	1:30.97

==== Kayak ====
Event	Gold		Silver		Bronze	
K–1 200 m	Andrea Di Liberto; Italy	34.15	Marko Dragosavljević; Serbia	34.72	Carlos Arévalo; Spain	34.98
K–1 500 m	Thomas Green; Australia	1:37.66	Ádám Varga; Hungary	1:38.07	Alex Borucki; Poland	1:38.95
K–1 1000 m	Fernando Pimenta; Portugal	3:24.39	Bálint Kopasz; Hungary	3:24.61	Thomas Green; Australia	3:25.80
K–1 5000 m	Fernando Pimenta; Portugal	24:15.72	Hamish Lovemore; South Africa	24:17.17	Mads Pedersen; Denmark	24:18.17
K–2 500 m	Germany; Jacob Schopf; Max Lemke	1:27.57	Portugal; João Ribeiro; Messias Baptista	1:29.29	Czech Republic; Jakub Špicar; Daniel Havel	1:29.94
K–4 500 m	Germany; Max Rendschmidt; Max Lemke; Jacob Schopf; Tom Liebscher	1:23.95	Australia; Jean van der Westhuyzen; Pierre van der Westhuyzen; Riley Fitzsimmons; Noah Havard	1:24.57	Portugal; Gustavo Gonçalves; João Ribeiro; Messias Baptista; Pedro Casinha	1:25.53

=== Women ===
==== Canoe ====
Event	Gold		Silver		Bronze	
C–1 200 m	Liudmyla Luzan; Ukraine	44.40	Sophia Jensen; Canada	44.90	Nevin Harrison; United States	45.04
C–1 500 m	Sophia Jensen; Canada	2:00.78	Ágnes Kiss; Hungary	2:02.80	Alena Nazdrova; AIN-B	2:04.80
C–1 5000 m	Carlotta Loske; Germany	31:15.19	Zsófia Csorba; Hungary	31:45.85	Maryia Papichych; AIN-B	31:47.48
C–2 200 m	AIN-B; Yuliya Trushkina; Inna Nedelkina	42.26	Uzbekistan; Shokhsanam Sherzodova; Nilufar Zokirova	42.52	China; Shuai Changwen; Lin Wenjun	42.65
C–2 500 m	Germany; Carlotta Loske; Maike Jakob	2:01.65	Ukraine; Liudmyla Luzan; Anastasiia Rybachok	2:02.28	AIN-B; Anhelina Bardanouskaya; Inna Nedelkina	2:02.67
C–4 500 m	China; Jiang Xina; Teng Anshuo; Sun Mengya; Ma Yanan	1:45.68	Hungary; Ágnes Kiss; Bianka Nagy; Réka Opavszky; Zsófia Csorba	1:46.61	Canada; Zoe Wojtyk; Élizabeth Desrosiers-McArthur; Sloan MacKenzie; Katie Vincent	1:48.17

==== Kayak ====
Event	Gold		Silver		Bronze	
K–1 200 m	Frederikke Mørcke; Denmark	39.71	Anna Lucz; Hungary	40.31	Sara Ouzande; Spain	40.71
K–1 500 m	Pauline Jagsch; Germany	1:47.55	Aimee Fisher; New Zealand	1:48.02	Natalia Drobot; Australia Anna Pulawska; Poland	1:48.58
K–1 1000 m	Zsóka Csikós; Hungary	4:11.95	Laia Pelachs; Spain	4:14.76	Pernille Knudsen; Denmark	4:17.30
K–1 5000 m	Melina Andersson; Sweden	27:19.42	Emese Kőhalmi; Hungary	27:51.18	Katerina Milová; Czech Republic	27:52.07
K–2 500 m	Australia; Kailey Harlen; Natalia Drobot	1:39.54	China; Yu Shimeng; Yin Mengdie	1:41.19	Germany; Paulina Paszek; Pauline Jagsch	1:41.20
K–4 500 m	China; Yu Shimeng; Yin Mengdie; Wang Nan; Shen Siyu	1:38.67	Spain; Sara Ouzande; Lucía Val; Daniela García; Bárbara Pardo	1:39.91	Germany; Paulina Paszek; Finja Hermanussen; Pauline Jagsch; Nele Reinwardt	1:39.93

== Paracanoe ==
=== Medal table ===
* Host nation (Poland)

Rank	Nation	Gold	Silver	Bronze	Total
1	Great Britain	4	0	1	5
2	Australia	2	0	0	2
3	China	1	2	0	3
–	Neutral Athletes	1	1	3	5
4	Hungary	1	1	0	2
5	Chile	1	0	0	1
5	Georgia	1	0	0	1
5	United States	1	0	0	1
8	Brazil	0	4	2	6
9	Canada	0	1	1	2
10	France	0	1	0	1
10	Italy	0	1	0	1
10	Ukraine	0	1	0	1
13	Germany	0	0	2	2
13	Uzbekistan	0	0	2	2
15	Japan	0	0	1	1
Totals (15 entries)		12	12	12	36

=== Medal events ===
Event	Gold		Silver		Bronze	
Men's KL1	Péter Pál Kiss; Hungary	46.35	Luis Cardoso da Silva; Brazil	47.25	Aleksandr Ilichev; Individual Neutral Athletes-B	48.39
Men's KL2	Curtis McGrath; Australia	42.76	Fernando Rufino; Brazil	42.79	Azizbek Abdulkhabibov; Uzbekistan	43.22
Men's KL3	Serhii Yemelianov; Georgia	39.82	Gabriel Paixão Porto; Brazil	39.91	Miquéias Elias Rodrigues; Brazil	40.68
Men's VL1	Benjamin Sainsbury; Australia	1:04.65	Ilya Taupianets; Individual Neutral Athletes-B	1:04.87	Artur Chuprov; Individual Neutral Athletes-A	1:05.74
Men's VL2	Steven Haxton; United States	49.71	Fernando Rufino; Brazil	51.34	Igor Alex Tofalini; Brazil	51.87
Men's VL3	Yi Pu; China	46.48 WB	Vladyslav Yepifanov; Ukraine	46.76	Stuart Wood; Great Britain	46.95
Women's KL1	Katherinne Wollermann; Chile	52.23	Xie Maosan; China	53.92	Brianna Hennessy; Canada	54.20
Women's KL2	Charlotte Henshaw; Great Britain	48.32	Katalin Varga; Hungary	51.66	Anja Adler; Germany	51.67
Women's KL3	Hope Gordon; Great Britain	45.53	Nélia Barbosa; France	45.65	Felicia Laberer; Germany	46.48
Women's VL1	Aleksandra Dupik; Individual Neutral Athletes-A	1:14.79	Viktoryia Shablova; Italy	1:17.49	Monika Seryu; Japan	1:20.86
Women's VL2	Emma Wiggs; Great Britain	58.76	Brianna Hennessy; Canada	1:00.82	Anastasia Miasnikova; Individual Neutral Athletes-B	1:02.31
Women's VL3	Hope Gordon; Great Britain	55.01	Zhong Yongyuan; China	57.04	Shakhzoda Mamadalieva; Uzbekistan	58.76

== Special Olympic (SO) ==
A series of races were also held for Special Olympic canoeists. No separate medal table was kept in relation to these races, and they did not form part of the overall medal table.

=== Events ===
Event	Gold	Silver	Bronze
Men's II Para KT-1 SO 200m details	Justas Jonas Guenther; Germany	Kevin Tobin; Canada	Samuel Kaser; Poland
Men's II KT-1 SO 200m details	Kevin Tobin; Canada	Niklas Hermes; Germany	Krystian Skiba; Poland
Men's II KT-2 U SO 200m details	Canada; Nikita Ciudin; Kevin Tobin	Poland; Szymon Klonowski; Maciej Antoniuk	Germany; Justyn Schubert; Kevin Engel
Men's II KT-2 SO 200m details	Poland-1; Rafal Kniter; Krystian Skiba	Poland-2; Konrad Pajak; Szymon Klonowski	Germany; Jan Eichler; Martin Schubert
Women's II Para KT-1 SO 200m details	Payton Dicks; Canada	Leona Johs; Germany	Joice Kreft; Germany
Women's II KT-2 U SO 200m details	Canada; Toshka Besharah; Payton Dicks	Germany; Phoebe Duffy; Leona Johs	Poland; Katarzyna Delecka; Patrycja Skrobala
Women's/Men's II KT-1 SO 200m details	Leona Johs; Germany	Katarzyna Delecka; Poland	Dominik Polczynski; Poland
