= Jonatán Hajdu =

Hungarian canoeist (born 1996)

Personal information
- Full name: Jonatán Dániel Hajdu
- Born: 6 June 1996 (age 30) Budapest, Hungary
- Height: 1.88 m (6 ft 2 in)
- Weight: 79 kg (174 lb)

Sport
- Country: Hungary
- Sport: Canoe sprint
- Events: C-2 200 m, C-2 500 m
- Club: Dunaferr SE
- Coached by: Gergely Molnár
Medal record
Men's canoe sprint
Representing Hungary
World Championships
Gold medal – first place	2025 Milan	C-4 500 m
Gold medal – first place	2026 Poznań	C-4 500 m
Silver medal – second place	2019 Szeged	C-2 500 m
Silver medal – second place	2021 Copenhagen	C-2 500 m
Silver medal – second place	2024 Samarkand	C-2 Mix 500 m
Bronze medal – third place	2014 Moscow	C-1 4×200 m
Bronze medal – third place	2017 Račice	C-2 200 m
European Championships
Bronze medal – third place	2017 Plovdiv	C-2 200 m

Jonatán Dániel Hajdu (born 28 June 1996) is a Hungarian sprint canoeist. He represented his country at the 2016 Summer Olympics.

== Major results ==
=== Olympic Games ===
Year	C-1 200	C-2 500
2016	2 FB	—N/a
2024	—N/a	6

=== World championships ===
Year	C-1 200	C-2 200	C-2 500	C-4 500	XC-2 500	C-1 4 × 200
2014				—N/a	—N/a	3rd place, bronze medalist(s)
2015	7			—N/a	—N/a	—N/a
2017	6	3rd place, bronze medalist(s)		—N/a	—N/a	—N/a
2018		5	6		—N/a	—N/a
2019	5		2nd place, silver medalist(s)		—N/a	—N/a
2021	—N/a	—N/a	2nd place, silver medalist(s)		—N/a	—N/a
2022		—N/a	7			—N/a
2023		—N/a		4	4	—N/a
2024	5	—N/a	—N/a	—N/a	2nd place, silver medalist(s)	—N/a
