= Moritz Adam =

German canoeist

Personal information
- Nationality: German
- Born: 6 October 1999 (age 26) Berlin, Germany

Sport
- Country: Germany
- Sport: Sprint canoe
- Club: SC Berlin Grünau
Medal record
Men's canoe sprint
Representing Germany
World Championships
Silver medal – second place	2019 Szeged	C-4 500 m
Silver medal – second place	2023 Duisburg	C-2 1000 m
European Championships
Silver medal – second place	2024 Szeged	C-2 1000 m
Silver medal – second place	2026 Montemor-o-Velho	C-4 Mix 500 m
World U23 Championships
Gold medal – first place	2018 Plovdiv	C-2 1000 m
Gold medal – first place	2021 Montemor-o-Velho	C-2 1000 m
Bronze medal – third place	2021 Montemor-o-Velho	C-2 500 m
European U23 Championships
Gold medal – first place	2019 Poznań	C-2 1000 m

Moritz Adam (born 6 October 1999) is a German sprint canoeist.

He won a medal at the 2019 ICF Canoe Sprint World Championships.
