= Timofey Yemelyanov =

Kazakhstani canoeist (born 1993)

Personal information
- Nationality: Kazakhstani
- Born: 14 June 1993 (age 33) Shymkent, Kazakhstan

Sport
- Sport: Canoeing
- Event: Sprint canoe
Medal record
Men's canoe sprint
Representing Kazakhstan
Asian Games
Gold medal – first place	2014 Incheon	C-2 1000m
Silver medal – second place	2018 Jakarta-Palembang	C-2 1000m
Bronze medal – third place	2010 Guangzhou	C-2 1000m
Bronze medal – third place	2026 Aichi–Nagoya	C-2 500m
Asian Championships
Gold medal – first place	2013 Samarkand	C-2 200 m
Gold medal – first place	2017 Shanghai	C-2 1000 m
Gold medal – first place	2017 Shanghai	C-4 200 m
Gold medal – first place	2017 Shanghai	C-4 500 m
Gold medal – first place	2017 Shanghai	C-4 1000 m
Gold medal – first place	2022 Rayong	C-4 200 m
Gold medal – first place	2022 Rayong	C-4 500 m
Gold medal – first place	2022 Rayong	C-4 1000 m
Silver medal – second place	2011 Tehran	C-2 500 m
Silver medal – second place	2011 Tehran	C-2 1000 m
Silver medal – second place	2013 Samarkand	C-2 500 m
Silver medal – second place	2022 Rayong	C-2 1000 m
Bronze medal – third place	2015 Palembang	C-2 1000 m
Bronze medal – third place	2022 Rayong	C-2 200 m
Bronze medal – third place	2022 Rayong	C-2 500 m
Bronze medal – third place	2025 Nanchang	Mixed C-4 500 m

Timofey Yemelyanov (Тимофей Александрович Емельянов, born 14 June 1993) is a Kazakhstani canoeist. He competed in the men's C-2 1000 metres event at the 2020 Summer Olympics.
