= Sprint canoe =

Racing boat with 1, 2 or 4 paddlers

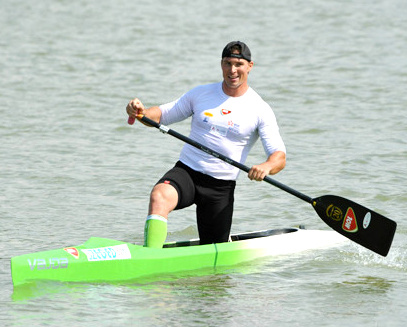
Sprint canoe

A sprint canoe is a canoe used in International Canoe Federation canoe sprint. It is an open boat propelled by one, two or four paddlers from a kneeling position, using single-bladed paddles. The difficulty of balance can depend on how wide or narrow the canoe is, although regularly the less contact a canoe has with the water the faster it goes. This makes the narrower boats much faster and popular when it comes to racing.

== History ==
Canoeing was a demonstration sport at the 1924 Summer Olympics in Paris. It was the first time that the sport was part of the Olympic program. The French Olympic Committee asked the Canadian Olympic Committee to demonstrate the sport in Paris. Races were arranged between the Canadian Canoe Association and the Washington Canoe Club from the United States. Events were held for C1, C2, and C4. Canoeing has been a medal sport since the 1936 Games in Berlin where C1s and C2s raced. 1924 was the last time C4s were raced in the Olympics.

The trend is towards reducing the course distance. Early races were staged over 1,000 and 10,000 meters for men and 5,000 meters for women. Today, they are over distances of 200, 500 and 1000 meters. For the 2012 Games in London, the 500m events were replaced by 200m events. However, in the ICF World Championships, distances of 5000m are still raced today.

Women's canoe debuted internationally at the 2010 championships in Poznań, Poland and will be in the Olympics for the first time with a C1 event at the 2020 Summer Olympics in Tokyo, Japan.

== Women's canoe ==
The exclusion of women's sprint canoe events in the Olympics has been a cause of controversy. Non-Olympic events such as the Pan American Championship also excluded women's canoe for 1000, 500, and 200 meter events since 2001. The Senior and U23 World Championships only include 2 official events for women's canoe. The group WomenCAN International works to push sprint canoe organizations to include more events for women's canoe. WomenCAN is led by American canoeist Pamela Boteler, who made canoe-kayak history in the 2000 National Championships by becoming the first woman to compete in sprint canoe, against the men, winning gold and bronze medals. In 2002, Boteler's lobbying convinced USA Canoe-Kayak to allow women to compete at the National Championships in their own events.

== Equipment ==
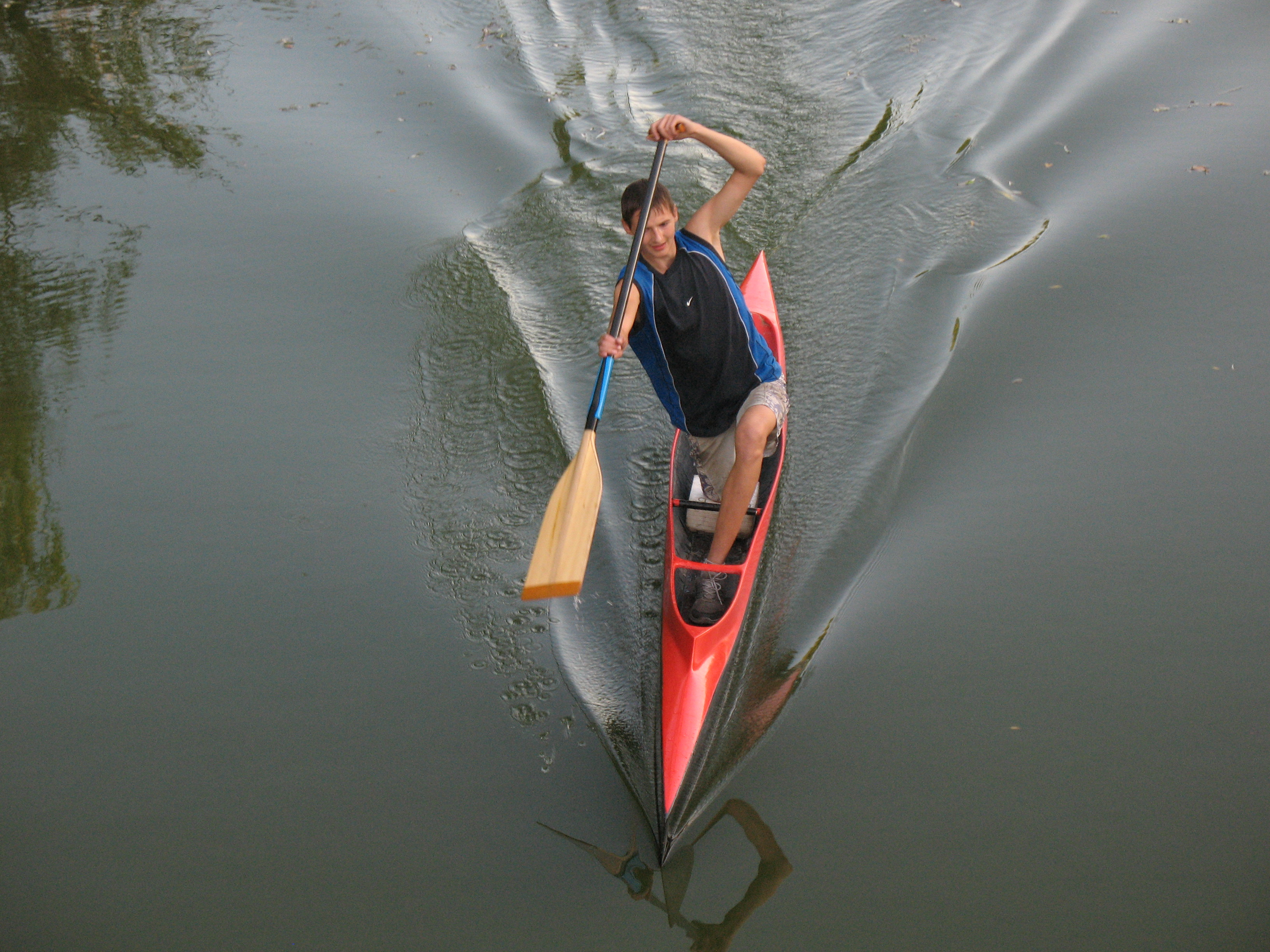
Sprint C1 viewed from above

Boats are symmetrical along the length and only paddled with single-bladed paddles. To keep course paddlers use what is called a J-stroke while they paddle. Paddlers kneel on a foam or cushioned block to stabilize their knee, and often have foot braces to secure their position. ICF Sprint boats are called C1, C2, C4, with the 'C' for canoe and the number for the number of paddlers required to (successfully) propel the vessel. (In several European countries the 'C' was interpreted as the 'C' for Canadian canoe.)

Boats	C1	C2	C4
Max. length in cm	520	650	900
Min. weight in kg	14	20	30

In Canada there also is the Canadian C4, which is wider than the ICF C4, and the C15 or war canoe.

Up to the year 2000 there was a regulation that a canoe had to have a minimum width of 75 cm, which led to boats flaring out above the water line to meet that requirement. These canoes were known as deltas, and typically have a diamond-shape, when viewed from above. An example was the Struer Delta, designed in 1956. The restriction was dropped soon after Plastex began manufacturing boats with wings.

There are three main companies who manufacture sprint canoes: Nelo, Plastex, and Vajda. Nelo are based in Portugal and was established in 1978. They are recognized as the largest canoe manufacturer in the world. Plastex was founded in 1990 by slalom canoeist Richard Seruga. They are Nelo's main competition in design innovation in sprint canoe. In 1999, Plastex made a design revolution, which pushed ICF Committee to change the rules concerning boats dimensions during ICF Congress 2000. Vajda, or Vajdagroup, specializes in sprint canoes and whirlpool spas. Their use of carbon and Nomex Honeycomb in their construction helps them build very light boats.

== Canada ==
Sprint Canoe-Kayak is very popular in Canada, unlike in the United States whose water sport activity is dominated by rowing. Many famous Canadian Olympic athletes competed in sprint canoe, such as Sue Holloway, the first Canadian and first woman to ever compete in both Summer and Winter Olympic Games in 1976 for cross-country skiing and sprint kayaking. Adam van Koeverden is another athlete who has become a prominent Canadian figure, working as a sports analyst for the Canadian national public service broadcaster, CBC, covering the Sochi Winter Olympics in 2014. In 2019 he was elected to the Canadian House of Commons, representing the electoral district of Milton. Van Koeverden first captured the world's attention at the 2004 Olympic Games where he was a double medalist, winning gold and bronze. Van Koeverden was selected as Canada's flag bearer at the closing ceremonies following his impressive performance, and as opening ceremonies flag-bearer in the London Olympics. He then won silver at both 2008 and 2012 Games. Van Koeverden was named "Canada's Athlete of the Year" in 2012. He is also an ambassador for Right to Play, and involved with the Canadian Olympic Committee's Athlete Commission, the David Suzuki Foundation, Colon Cancer Canada, and the World Wildlife Fund.

Canada is the only country in the world to race war canoe, or C15, and is the focal point of the club system. War canoes are often made of wood and their design has remained mostly unchanged for decades. War canoe may also be made of fibreglass, or another composite. War canoe paddles are single bladed and made of wood or carbon-fibre. These paddles are shorter than a C1 or C2 paddler would use. War canoes are steered by a cox, or steersperson, who use a much bigger and longer blade to allow for more control. War canoe races are exciting and allow for canoe clubs to showcase club pride. Races vary between distances of 200, 500, and 1000 meters.

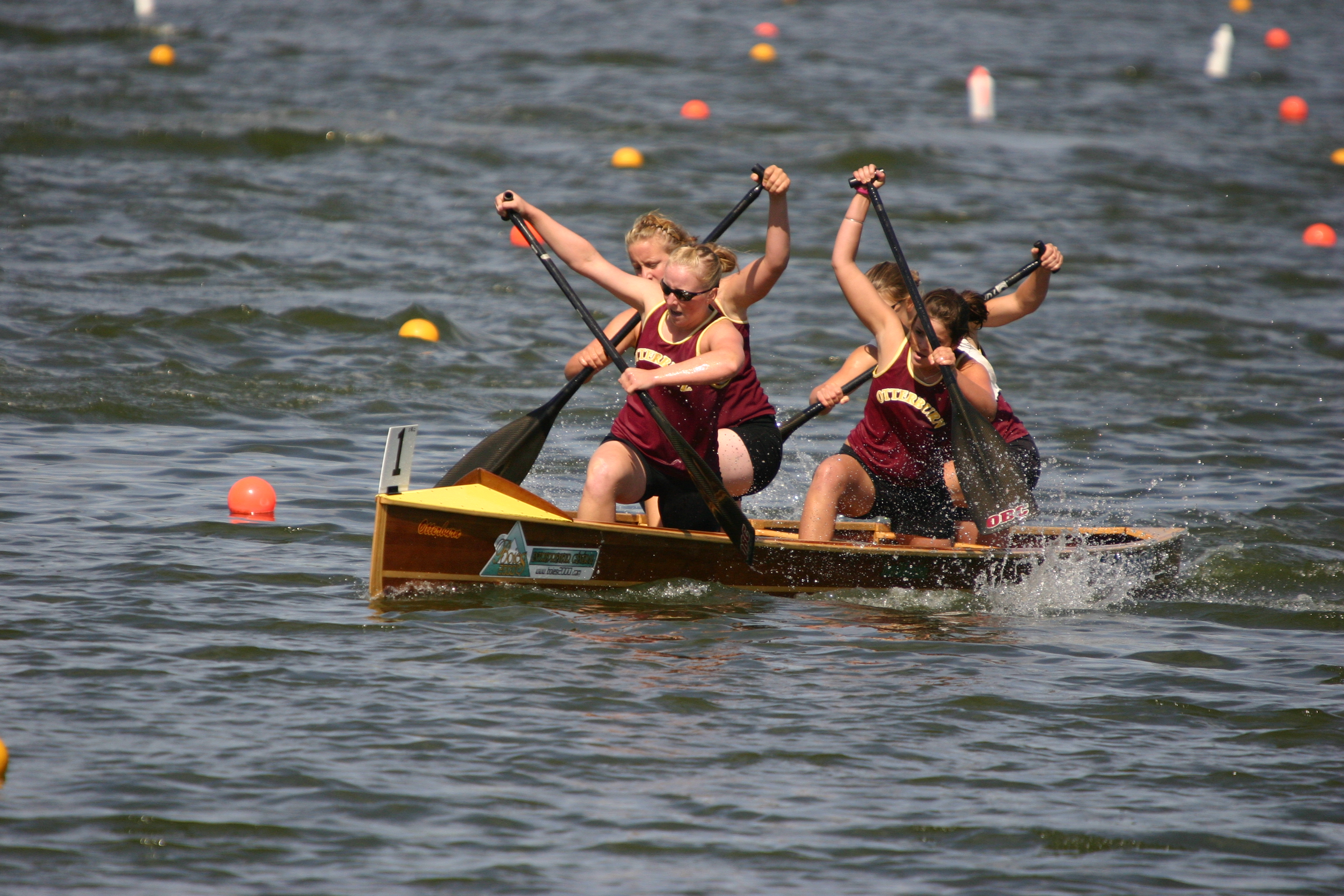
Canadian C4

The Canadian C4 is another boat exclusive to Canada. It is wider than the ICF C4, the International Canoe for four people. The John W. Black Trophy, which can be won at the Canadian National Canoe Championships, is famous and likened to the Stanley Cup. It was first introduced in 1928 on behalf of the Canadian Canoe Association from its donor, Mr. John W. Black. It is awarded to the winner of the Junior Men's C4 1000 meter event, a highly anticipated event at the Canadian Nationals. "The Black", as it is known colloquially, conjures up images of strong competitive canoe racing. As it is a junior race, if a crew comes first or second they cannot compete for the trophy again for a specified time frame. In 2001, Birks Jewelers worked to restore the trophy to its original lustre; in 2006 to 2008, additional repairs were made to the trophy box. It is believed to be the largest trophy awarded in North America for amateur sport.

There are six divisions in Canadian sprint canoe: Pacific, Prairie, Western Ontario Division, Eastern Ontario Division, Quebec, and Atlantic. There are over 60 canoe clubs across the country. The Rideau Canoe Club is the current National Champion and CanMas (Canadian Masters) champion. Founded in 1902, The Rideau Canoe Club is one of the oldest canoe clubs, located on the Rideau Canal in Ottawa, Ontario.
