= 2021 ICF Canoe Sprint World Championships – Men's C-2 500 metres =

Men's C-2 500 metres at the 2021 ICF Canoe Sprint World Championships
- Venue: Lake Bagsværd
- Location: Copenhagen, Denmark
- Dates: 17–19 September
- Competitors: 34 from 17 nations
- Winning time: 1:39.90

Medalists
gold medal	Nicolae Craciun; Daniele Santini	Italy
silver medal	Jonatán Hajdu; Ádám Fekete	Hungary
bronze medal	Viktor Melantyev; Vladislav Chebotar	International Olympic Committee

The men's C-2 500 metres competition at the 2021 ICF Canoe Sprint World Championships in Copenhagen took place on Lake Bagsværd.

== Schedule ==
The schedule was as follows:

Date	Time	Round
Friday 17 September 2021	10:03	Heats
Friday 17 September 2021	16:37	Semifinal
Sunday 19 September 2021	11:42	Final

All times are Central European Summer Time (UTC+2)

== Results ==
=== Heats ===
The fastest three boats in each heat advanced directly to the final.
The next four fastest boats in each heat, plus the fastest remaining boat advanced to the semifinal.

==== Heat 1 ====
Rank	Canoeists	Country	Time	Notes
1	Nicolae Craciun; Daniele Santini	Italy	1:45.13	QF
2	Wiktor Głazunow; Tomasz Barniak	Poland	1:45.34	QF
3	Viktor Melantyev; Vladislav Chebotar	RCF	1:45.66	QF
4	Loïc Leonard; Adrien Bart	France	1:46.69	QS
5	Vitaliy Vergeles; Andrii Rybachok	Ukraine	1:47.98	QS
6	Leonid Carp; Victor Mihalachi	Romania	1:48.15	QS
7	Serguey Torres; Fernando Jorge	Cuba	1:49.76	QS
8	Peter Kretschmer; Michael Müller	Germany	1:49.98	qS
–	Hermie Macaranas; John Selecio	Philippines	DNS	

==== Heat 2 ====
Rank	Canoeists	Country	Time	Notes
1	Cayetano García; Pablo Martínez	Spain	1:45.04	QF
2	Jonatán Hajdu; Ádám Fekete	Hungary	1:45.47	QF
3	Henrikas Žustautas; Vadim Korobov	Lithuania	1:45.65	QF
4	Jiří Minařík; Jiří Zalubil	Czech Republic	1:46.32	QS
5	Tyler Laidlaw; Alix Plomteux	Canada	1:47.78	QS
6	Mikita Rudzevich; Vitali Asetski	Belarus	1:49.12	QS
7	Eduard Strýček; Peter Kizek	Slovakia	1:51.76	QS
8	Masato Hashimoto; Aoto Yabu	Japan	1:55.09	

=== Semifinal ===
The fastest three boats advanced to the final.

Rank	Canoeists	Country	Time	Notes
1	Vitaliy Vergeles; Andrii Rybachok	Ukraine	1:41.98	QF
2	Loïc Leonard; Adrien Bart	France	1:42.07	QF
3	Jiří Minařík; Jiří Zalubil	Czech Republic	1:42.49	QF
4	Serguey Torres; Fernando Jorge	Cuba	1:43.49	
5	Leonid Carp; Victor Mihalachi	Romania	1:43.69	
6	Mikita Rudzevich; Vitali Asetski	Belarus	1:43.70	
7	Tyler Laidlaw; Alix Plomteux	Canada	1:44.35	
8	Peter Kretschmer; Michael Müller	Germany	1:46.65	
9	Eduard Strýček; Peter Kizek	Slovakia	1:47.90	

=== Final ===
Competitors raced for positions 1 to 9, with medals going to the top three.

Rank	Canoeists	Country	Time
1st place, gold medalist(s)	Nicolae Craciun; Daniele Santini	Italy	1:39.90
2nd place, silver medalist(s)	Jonatán Hajdu; Ádám Fekete	Hungary	1:40.20
3rd place, bronze medalist(s)	Viktor Melantyev; Vladislav Chebotar	RCF	1:40.92
4	Wiktor Głazunow; Tomasz Barniak	Poland	1:42.03
5	Henrikas Žustautas; Vadim Korobov	Lithuania	1:42.16
5	Vitaliy Vergeles; Andrii Rybachok	Ukraine	1:42.16
7	Loïc Leonard; Adrien Bart	France	1:42.27
8	Jiří Minařík; Jiří Zalubil	Czech Republic	1:42.34
9	Cayetano García; Pablo Martínez	Spain	1:45.18
