= 2023 ICF Canoe Sprint World Championships – Men's C-2 500 metres =

Men's C-2 500 metres at the 2023 ICF Canoe Sprint World Championships
- Venue: Sportpark Duisburg
- Location: Duisburg, Germany
- Dates: 24–27 August
- Competitors: 68 from 34 nations
- Winning time: 1:36.972

Medalists
gold medal	Peter Kretschmer; Tim Hecker	Germany
silver medal	Liu Hao; Ji Bowen	China
bronze medal	Cayetano García; Pablo Martínez	Spain

The men's C-2 500 metres competition at the 2023 ICF Canoe Sprint World Championships in Duisburg took place in Sportpark Duisburg.

== Schedule ==
The schedule is as follows:

Date	Time	Round
Thursday 24 August 2023	10:13	Heats
Saturday 26 August 2023	15:44	Semifinals
Sunday 27 August 2023	10:34	Final C
Sunday 27 August 2023	10:40	Final B
Sunday 27 August 2023	11:59	Final A

== Results ==
=== Heats ===
The fastest five boats in each heat, plus the fastest two remaining boats, advanced to the semi-finals.

==== Heat 1 ====
Rank	Canoeist	Country	Time	Notes
1	Aleksander Kitewski; Norman Zezula	Poland	1:40.887	QS
2	Loïc Léonard; Adrien Bart	France	1:42.828	QS
3	Bruno Afonso; Marco Apura	Portugal	1:44.167	QS
4	Eduard Strýček; Peter Kizek	Slovakia	1:46.045	QS
5	Ojay Fuentes; John-Paul Selecio	Philippines	1:50.595	QS
6	Gevorg Pilosyan; Vahe Davtyan	Armenia	1:53.051	
7	Kelvi Nazare; Admilson André Batista De Sousa	São Tomé and Príncipe	2:06.518	
	Edwar Paredes; Luis Yasser Guerra	Venezuela	DNS	

==== Heat 2 ====
Rank	Canoeist	Country	Time	Notes
1	Gabriele Casadei; Carlo Tacchini	Italy	1:40.679	QS
2	Jacky Godmann; Isaquias Queiroz	Brazil	1:42.171	QS
3	Henrikas Žustautas; Vadim Korobov	Lithuania	1:43.429	QS
4	Benjamin Phillips; Jonathan Jones	Great Britain	1:44.772	QS
5	Alejandro Rodríguez; Daniel Pacheco	Colombia	1:45.317	QS
6	Rudiansyah Rudiansyah; Muhammad Burhan	Indonesia	1:50.581	
	Mussa Chamaune; Joaquim Lobo	Mozambique	DNS	

==== Heat 3 ====
Rank	Canoeist	Country	Time	Notes
1	Liu Hao; Ji Bowen	China	1:38.973	QS
2	Ilie Sprîncean; Oleg Nuţă	Romania	1:39.424	QS
3	Dávid Korisánszky; Ádám Fekete	Hungary	1:40.007	QS
4	Sergey Yemelyanov; Timur Khaidarov	Kazakhstan	1:42.213	QS
5	Rigoberto Camilo; Gustavo Eslava	Mexico	1:45.174	QS
6	Nils Medins; Staņislavs Ļesčinskis	Latvia	1:47.612	QS
7	Cristian Sola; Daniel Leon	Ecuador	1:53.406	

==== Heat 4 ====
Rank	Canoeist	Country	Time	Notes
1	Cayetano García; Pablo Martínez	Spain	1:39.173	QS
2	Peter Kretschmer; Tim Hecker	Germany	1:39.806	QS
3	Oleg Tarnovschi; Mihai Chihaia	Moldova	1:41.172	QS
4	Preslav Georgiev; Angel Kodinov	Bulgaria	1:41.881	QS
5	Masato Hashimoto; Ryo Naganuma	Japan	1:43.558	QS
6	Ribason Singh Ningthoujam; Gyaneshwor Singh Philem	India	1:46.706	QS
7	Jonathan Grady; Ian Ross	United States	1:46.732	

==== Heat 5 ====
Rank	Canoeist	Country	Time	Notes
1	Petr Fuksa; Martin Fuksa	Czech Republic	1:40.655	QS
2	Craig Spence; Alix Plomteux	Canada	1:41.421	QS
3	Vitaliy Vergeles; Andrii Rybachok	Ukraine	1:44.554	QS
4	Adel Mojallali; Syedkia Eskandanihossein	Iran	1:45.880	QS
5	Artur Guliev; Kamronbek Akhtamov	Uzbekistan	1:48.240	QS
6	Manuel Antonio; Benilson Sanda	Angola	1:50.453	
7	Sidali Belaidi; Mohamed Ali Merzougui	Algeria	2:07.222	

=== Semifinal ===
The fastest three boats in each semi advanced to the A final.
The next three fastest boats in each semi advanced to the final B.

==== Semifinal 1 ====
Rank	Canoeist	Country	Time	Notes
1	Cayetano García; Pablo Martínez	Spain	1:38.894	QA
2	Aleksander Kitewski; Norman Zezula	Poland	1:39.325	QA
3	Dávid Korisánszky; Ádám Fekete	Hungary	1:39.362	QA
4	Craig Spence; Alix Plomteux	Canada	1:40.094	QB
5	Preslav Georgiev; Angel Kodinov	Bulgaria	1:40.802	QB
6	Jacky Godmann; Isaquias Queiroz	Brazil	1:41.982	QB
7	Artur Guliev; Kamronbek Akhtamov	Uzbekistan	1:43.590	QC
8	Alejandro Rodríguez; Daniel Pacheco	Colombia	1:44.006	QC
9	Eduard Strýček; Peter Kizek	Slovakia	1:44.239	QC

==== Semifinal 2 ====
Rank	Canoeist	Country	Time	Notes
1	Peter Kretschmer; Tim Hecker	Germany	1:39.591	QA
2	Liu Hao; Ji Bowen	China	1:40.241	QA
3	Loïc Léonard; Adrien Bart	France	1:41.109	QA
4	Vitaliy Vergeles; Andrii Rybachok	Ukraine	1:41.577	QB
5	Henrikas Žustautas; Vadim Korobov	Lithuania	1:42.070	QB
6	Sergey Yemelyanov; Timur Khaidarov	Kazakhstan	1:43.170	QB
7	Masato Hashimoto; Ryo Naganuma	Japan	1:43.422	QC
8	Ribason Singh Ningthoujam; Gyaneshwor Singh Philem	India	1:49.990	QC
9	Ojay Fuentes; John-Paul Selecio	Philippines	2:03.309	QC

==== Semifinal 3 ====
Rank	Canoeist	Country	Time	Notes
1	Ilie Sprîncean; Oleg Nuţă	Romania	1:39.306	QA
2	Petr Fuksa; Martin Fuksa	Czech Republic	1:39.309	QA
3	Gabriele Casadei; Carlo Tacchini	Italy	1:39.749	QA
4	Oleg Tarnovschi; Mihai Chihaia	Moldova	1:41.294	QB
5	Bruno Afonso; Marco Apura	Portugal	1:43.180	QB
6	Rigoberto Camilo; Gustavo Eslava	Mexico	1:43.525	QB
7	Benjamin Phillips; Jonathan Jones	Great Britain	1:44.793	QC
8	Nils Medins; Staņislavs Ļesčinskis	Latvia	1:48.274	QC
9	Adel Mojallali; Syedkia Eskandanihossein	Iran	1:49.168	QC

=== Finals ===
==== Final C ====
Competitors in this final raced for positions 19 to 27.

Rank	Canoeist	Country	Time
1	Artur Guliev; Kamronbek Akhtamov	Uzbekistan	1:42.301
2	Masato Hashimoto; Ryo Naganuma	Japan	1:43.515
3	Adel Mojallali; Syedkia Eskandanihossein	Iran	1:43.893
4	Eduard Strýček; Peter Kizek	Slovakia	1:44.015
5	Benjamin Phillips; Jonathan Jones	Great Britain	1:44.843
6	Alejandro Rodríguez; Daniel Pacheco	Colombia	1:45.241
7	Nils Medins; Staņislavs Ļesčinskis	Latvia	1:46.571
8	Ribason Singh Ningthoujam; Gyaneshwor Singh Philem	India	1:47.627
9	Ojay Fuentes; John-Paul Selecio	Philippines	1:50.289

==== Final B ====
Competitors in this final raced for positions 10 to 18.

Rank	Canoeist	Country	Time
1	Vitaliy Vergeles; Andrii Rybachok	Ukraine	1:41.001
2	Craig Spence; Alix Plomteux	Canada	1:41.269
3	Oleg Tarnovschi; Mihai Chihaia	Moldova	1:41.509
4	Henrikas Žustautas; Vadim Korobov	Lithuania	1:41.908
5	Sergey Yemelyanov; Timur Khaidarov	Kazakhstan	1:43.081
6	Preslav Georgiev; Angel Kodinov	Bulgaria	1:43.224
7	Bruno Afonso; Marco Apura	Portugal	1:45.063
8	Jacky Godmann; Isaquias Queiroz	Brazil	1:45.424
9	Rigoberto Camilo; Gustavo Eslava	Mexico	1:45.734

==== Final A ====
Competitors raced for positions 1 to 9, with medals going to the top three.

Rank	Canoeist	Country	Time
1st place, gold medalist(s)	Peter Kretschmer; Tim Hecker	Germany	1:36.972
2nd place, silver medalist(s)	Liu Hao; Ji Bowen	China	1:38.126
3rd place, bronze medalist(s)	Cayetano García; Pablo Martínez	Spain	1:38.571
4	Loïc Léonard; Adrien Bart	France	1:38.585
5	Dávid Korisánszky; Ádám Fekete	Hungary	1:38.770
6	Ilie Sprîncean; Oleg Nuţă	Romania	1:38.781
7	Gabriele Casadei; Carlo Tacchini	Italy	1:38.923
8	Petr Fuksa; Martin Fuksa	Czech Republic	1:39.471
9	Aleksander Kitewski; Norman Zezula	Poland	1:39.683
