= Canoe sprint at the 2023 European Games – Men's C-2 500 metres =

Men's C-2 500 metres at the 2023 European Games
- Venue: Kryspinów Waterway
- Date: 21–22 June
- Competitors: 28 from 14 nations
- Teams: 14
- Winning time: 1:40.168

Medalists
gold medal	Gabriele Casadei; Carlo Tacchini	Italy
silver medal	Cayetano García; Pablo Martínez	Spain
bronze medal	Aleksander Kitewski; Norman Zezula	Poland

The men's C-2 500 metres canoe sprint competition at the 2023 European Games took place on 21 and 22 June at the Kryspinów Waterway.

== Schedule ==
All times are local (UTC+2).

Date	Time	Round
Wednesday, 21 June 2023	9:54	Heats
Wednesday, 21 June 2023	16:00	Semifinal
Thursday, 22 June 2023	14:16	Final

== Results ==
=== Heats ===
==== Heat 1 ====
Rank	Canoeists	Country	Time	Notes
1	Gabriele Casadei; Carlo Tacchini	Italy	1:40.380	QF, GB
2	Cayetano García; Pablo Martínez	Spain	1:40.427	QF
3	Henrikas Žustautas; Vadim Korobov	Lithuania	1:41.160	QF
4	Jonatán Hajdu; Ádám Fekete	Hungary	1:41.313	QS
5	Vitaliy Vergeles; Andrii Rybachok	Ukraine	1:44.244	QS
6	Bruno Afonso; Marco Apura	Portugal	1:46.504	QS
7	Gia Gabedava; Malkhaz Tchintcharashvili	Georgia	1:51.854	QS

==== Heat 2 ====
Rank	Canoeists	Country	Time	Notes
1	Petr Fuksa; Martin Fuksa	Czech Republic	1:40.971	QF
2	Aleksander Kitewski; Norman Zezula	Poland	1:41.094	QF
3	Peter Kretschmer; Tim Hecker	Germany	1:41.861	QF
4	Loïc Léonard; Adrien Bart	France	1:44.735	QS
5	Oleg Tarnovschi; Mihai Chihaia	Moldova	1:45.455	QS
6	Benjamin Phillips; Jonathan Jones	Great Britain	1:46.581	QS
7	Eduard Strýček; Peter Kizek	Slovakia	1:46.741	QS

=== Semifinal ===
Rank	Canoeists	Country	Time	Notes
1	Jonatán Hajdu; Ádám Fekete	Hungary	1:43.273	QF
2	Oleg Tarnovschi; Mihai Chihaia	Moldova	1:44.067	QF
3	Vitaliy Vergeles; Andrii Rybachok	Ukraine	1:44.300	QF
4	Loïc Léonard; Adrien Bart	France	1:44.433	
5	Eduard Strýček; Peter Kizek	Slovakia	1:46.667	
6	Bruno Afonso; Marco Apura	Portugal	1:47.100	
7	Benjamin Phillips; Jonathan Jones	Great Britain	1:48.454	
8	Gia Gabedava; Malkhaz Tchintcharashvili	Georgia	1:53.607	

=== Final ===
Rank	Canoeists	Country	Time
1st place, gold medalist(s)	Gabriele Casadei; Carlo Tacchini	Italy	1:40.168; GB
2nd place, silver medalist(s)	Cayetano García; Pablo Martínez	Spain	1:40.513
3rd place, bronze medalist(s)	Aleksander Kitewski; Norman Zezula	Poland	1:40.553
4	Jonatán Hajdu; Ádám Fekete	Hungary	1:40.728
5	Petr Fuksa; Martin Fuksa	Czech Republic	1:40.943
6	Peter Kretschmer; Tim Hecker	Germany	1:41.228
7	Henrikas Žustautas; Vadim Korobov	Lithuania	1:41.573
8	Vitaliy Vergeles; Andrii Rybachok	Ukraine	1:41.903
9	Oleg Tarnovschi; Mihai Chihaia	Moldova	1:43.833
