= 2022 ICF Canoe Sprint World Championships – Men's C-2 500 metres =

Men's C-2 500 metres at the 2022 ICF Canoe Sprint World Championships
- Venue: Lake Banook
- Location: Dartmouth, Canada
- Dates: 3–6 August
- Competitors: 34 from 17 nations
- Winning time: 1:46.32

Medalists
gold medal	Cayetano García; Pablo Martínez	Spain
silver medal	Wiktor Głazunow; Tomasz Barniak	Poland
bronze medal	Liu Hao; Ji Bowen	China

The men's C-2 500 metres competition at the 2022 ICF Canoe Sprint World Championships in Dartmouth took place on Lake Banook.

== Schedule ==
The schedule is as follows:

Date	Time	Round
Wednesday 3 August 2022	12:12	Heats
Friday 5 August 2022	10:39	Semifinals
Saturday 6 August 2022	11:43	Final A
Saturday 6 August 2022	14:36	Final B

== Results ==
=== Heats ===
The fastest boat in each heat advanced directly to the A final.
The next six fastest boats in each heat advanced to the semifinals.

==== Heat 1 ====
Rank	Canoeist	Country	Time	Notes
1	Wiktor Głazunow; Tomasz Barniak	Poland	1:42.75	QA
2	Sebastian Brendel; Tim Hecker	Germany	1:44.00	QS
3	Oleg Tarnovschi; Serghei Tarnovschi	Moldova	1:46.26	QS
4	Tyler Laidlaw; Alix Plomteux	Canada	1:46.66	QS
5	Loïc Leonard; Adrien Bart	France	1:46.83	QS
6	Guillermo Quirino; Rigoberto Camilo	Mexico	1:55.65	QS

==== Heat 2 ====
Rank	Canoeist	Country	Time	Notes
1	Nicolae Craciun; Daniele Santini	Italy	1:42.75	QA
2	Erlon Silva; Filipe Vieira	Brazil	1:43.67	QS
3	Antonín Hrabal; Jiří Zalubil	Czech Republic	1:47.23	QS
4	Serguey Madrigal; Tabiani Álvarez	Cuba	1:47.46	QS
5	Vitaliy Vergeles; Andrii Rybachok	Ukraine	1:50.42	QS

==== Heat 3 ====
Rank	Canoeist	Country	Time	Notes
1	Cayetano García; Pablo Martínez	Spain	1:41.18	QA
2	Liu Hao; Ji Bowen	China	1:41.96	QS
3	Henrikas Žustautas; Vadim Korobov	Lithuania	1:44.32	QS
4	Jonatán Hajdu; Ádám Fekete	Hungary	1:46.93	QS
5	Alejandro Rodríguez; Daniel Pacheco	Colombia	1:49.41	QS
6	Ryo Naganuma; Shuhei Hosumi	Japan	1:52.68	QS

=== Semifinals ===
The three fastest boats in each semi advanced to the A final.
The next four fastest boats in each semi, plus the fastest remaining boat advanced to the B final.

==== Semifinal 1 ====
Rank	Canoeist	Country	Time	Notes
1	Liu Hao; Ji Bowen	China	1:44.14	QA
2	Jonatán Hajdu; Ádám Fekete	Hungary	1:44.39	QA
3	Loïc Leonard; Adrien Bart	France	1:45.33	QA
4	Oleg Tarnovschi; Serghei Tarnovschi	Moldova	1:45.51	QB
5	Serguey Madrigal; Tabiani Álvarez	Cuba	1:47.55	QB
6	Antonín Hrabal; Jiří Zalubil	Czech Republic	1:48.55	QB
7	Guillermo Quirino; Rigoberto Camilo	Mexico	1:52.39	QB

==== Semifinal 2 ====
Rank	Canoeist	Country	Time	Notes
1	Sebastian Brendel; Tim Hecker	Germany	1:44.13	QA
2	Vitaliy Vergeles; Andrii Rybachok	Ukraine	1:44.20	QA
3	Henrikas Žustautas; Vadim Korobov	Lithuania	1:44.89	QA
4	Erlon Silva; Filipe Vieira	Brazil	1:45.18	QB
5	Tyler Laidlaw; Alix Plomteux	Canada	1:47.11	QB
6	Ryo Naganuma; Shuhei Hosumi	Japan	1:49.13	QB
7	Alejandro Rodríguez; Daniel Pacheco	Colombia	1:49.65	QB

=== Finals ===
==== Final B ====
Competitors in this final raced for positions 10 to 17.

Rank	Canoeist	Country	Time
1	Oleg Tarnovschi; Serghei Tarnovschi	Moldova	1:53.81
2	Erlon Silva; Filipe Vieira	Brazil	1:54.32
3	Tyler Laidlaw; Alix Plomteux	Canada	1:54.76
4	Antonín Hrabal; Jiří Zalubil	Czech Republic	1:56.82
5	Serguey Madrigal; Tabiani Álvarez	Cuba	1:57.36
6	Ryo Naganuma; Shuhei Hosumi	Japan	1:59.04
7	Guillermo Quirino; Rigoberto Camilo	Mexico	1:59.18
8	Alejandro Rodríguez; Daniel Pacheco	Colombia	2:00.18

==== Final A ====
Competitors in this final raced for positions 1 to 9, with medals going to the top three.

Rank	Canoeist	Country	Time
1st place, gold medalist(s)	Cayetano García; Pablo Martínez	Spain	1:46.32
2nd place, silver medalist(s)	Wiktor Głazunow; Tomasz Barniak	Poland	1:46.81
3rd place, bronze medalist(s)	Liu Hao; Ji Bowen	China	1:46.90
4	Sebastian Brendel; Tim Hecker	Germany	1:47.04
5	Nicolae Craciun; Daniele Santini	Italy	1:48.02
6	Vitaliy Vergeles; Andrii Rybachok	Ukraine	1:48.06
7	Jonatán Hajdu; Ádám Fekete	Hungary	1:48.46
8	Henrikas Žustautas; Vadim Korobov	Lithuania	1:49.29
9	Loïc Leonard; Adrien Bart	France	1:49.43
