= Canoe sprint at the 2023 European Games – Mixed C-2 200 metres =

Mixed C-2 500 metres at the 2023 European Games
- Venue: Kryspinów Waterway
- Date: 22–24 June
- Competitors: 20 from 10 nations
- Teams: 10
- Winning time: 39.413

Medalists
gold medal	Pablo Graña; Antía Jácome	Spain
silver medal	Aleksander Kitewski; Sylwia Szczerbińska	Poland
bronze medal	Nico Pickert; Annika Loske	Germany

The mixed C-2 500 metres canoe sprint competition at the 2023 European Games took place from 22 to 24 June at the Kryspinów Waterway.

== Schedule ==
All times are local (UTC+2).

Date	Time	Round
Thursday, 22 June 2023	17:17	Heats
Friday, 23 June 2023	17:47	Semifinal
Saturday, 24 June 2023	14:53	Final

== Results ==
=== Heats ===
==== Heat 1 ====
Rank	Canoeists	Country	Time	Notes
1	Bianka Nagy; Ádám Fekete	Hungary	41.018	QF
2	Mihai Chihaia; Maria Olărașu	Moldova	41.038	QF
3	Antonín Hrabal; Denisa Řáhová	Czech Republic	41.080	QF
4	Hélder Silva; Inês Penetra	Portugal	41.120	QS
5	Chloé Nicot; Lucas Laroche	France	42.512	QS

==== Heat 2 ====
Rank	Canoeists	Country	Time	Notes
1	Antía Jácome; Pablo Graña	Spain	40.210	QF, GB
2	Aleksander Kitewski; Sylwia Szczerbińska	Poland	40.526	QF
3	Nico Pickert; Annika Loske	Germany	41.506	QF
4	Vitaliy Vergeles; Valeriia Tereta	Ukraine	42.620	QS
5	Gabrielė Čerepokaitė; Vadim Korobov	Lithuania	43.857	QS

=== Semifinal ===
Rank	Canoeists	Country	Time	Notes
1	Vitaliy Vergeles; Valeriia Tereta	Ukraine	40.494	QF
2	Hélder Silva; Inês Penetra	Portugal	40.644	QF
3	Chloé Nicot; Lucas Laroche	France	42.470	QF
	Gabrielė Čerepokaitė; Vadim Korobov	Lithuania	DNS	

=== Final ===
Rank	Canoeists	Country	Time
1st place, gold medalist(s)	Antía Jácome; Pablo Graña	Spain	39.413 GB
2nd place, silver medalist(s)	Aleksander Kitewski; Sylwia Szczerbińska	Poland	40.601
3rd place, bronze medalist(s)	Nico Pickert; Annika Loske	Germany	40.697
4	Bianka Nagy; Ádám Fekete	Hungary	40.741
5	Mihai Chihaia; Maria Olărașu	Moldova	40.773
6	Vitaliy Vergeles; Valeriia Tereta	Ukraine	41.525
7	Hélder Silva; Inês Penetra	Portugal	41.733
8	Antonín Hrabal; Denisa Řáhová	Czech Republic	42.179
9	Chloé Nicot; Lucas Laroche	France	43.411
