= Canoeing at the 2020 Summer Olympics – Men's C-2 1000 metres =

Men's C-2 1000 metres at the Games of the XXXII Olympiad
- Canoeing pictogram
- Venue: Sea Forest Waterway
- Dates: 2 August 2021 (heats and quarterfinal); 3 August 2021 (semifinal & final)
- Competitors: 28 (14 boats) from 14 nations
- Winning time: 3:24.995

Medalists
| 1st place, gold medalist(s) | | Serguey Torres; Fernando Jorge | Cuba |
| 2nd place, silver medalist(s) | | Liu Hao; Zheng Pengfei | China |
| 3rd place, bronze medalist(s) | | Sebastian Brendel; Tim Hecker | Germany |

The men's C-2 1000 metres sprint canoeing event at the 2020 Summer Olympics took place on 2 and 3 August 2021 at the Sea Forest Waterway. 28 canoeists (14 boats of 2) from 14 nations competed.

== Background ==
This was the 20th appearance of the event, one of four events to be held at every Summer Games since canoeing was introduced in 1936.

The reigning World Champions are Liu Hao and Wang Hao of China. The reigning Olympic champions are Sebastian Brendel and Jan Vandrey of Germany; Brendel will return, this time paired with Tim Hecker.

== Qualification ==
A National Olympic Committee (NOC) could enter only 1 qualified boat (2 canoeists) in the event. A total of 13 qualification places were available, initially allocated as follows:

- 8 places awarded through the 2019 ICF Canoe Sprint World Championships
- 5 places awarded through continental tournaments, 1 per continent

Qualifying places were awarded to the NOC, not to the individual canoeist who earned the place.

Isaquias Queiroz of Brazil qualified in both the C-2 and the C-1, resulting in an additional quota place added to the C-2 with the Czech Republic adding that quota place to its C-1 spot to qualify in the C-2. This brought the total number of boats in the event to 14. The Americas continental tournament was cancelled; that place was allocated through the World Championships, with the place going to Canada. The Oceania place was also reallocated, with Europe receiving a second place.

== Competition format ==
Sprint canoeing uses a four-round format for events with at least 11 boats, with heats, quarterfinals, semifinals, and finals. For a 14-boat event, the rounds are as follows:

- Heats: Two heats of 7 boats each. The top 2 boats in each heat (4 boats total) advance directly to the semifinals, with all others (10 boats) going to the quarterfinals.
- Quarterfinals: Two heats of 5 boats each. The top 3 boats in each heat (6 boats total) advance to the semifinals, with the remaining 4 boats out of medal contention and competing in the consolation Final B.
- Semifinals: Two heats of 5 boats each. The top 4 boats in each heat (8 boats total) advance to the medal Final A, with the remaining 2 boats out of medal contention and competing in consolation Final B.
- Finals: Final A consists of the top 8 boats, awarding the medals as well as 4th through 8th place. Final B features the remaining 6 boats, awarding 9th through 14th places.

The course is a flatwater course 9 metres wide. The name of the event describes the particular format within sprint canoeing. The "C" format means a canoe, with the canoeist kneeling and using a single-bladed paddle to paddle and steer (as opposed to a kayak, with a seated canoeist, double-bladed paddle, and foot-operated rudder). The "2" is the number of canoeists in each boat. The "1000 metres" is the distance of each race.

== Schedule ==
The event was held over two consecutive days, with two rounds per day. All sessions started at 9:30 a.m. local time, though there are multiple events with races in each session.

Legend
| H | Heats | ¼ | Quarter-finals | ½ | Semi-finals | F | Final |

Sprint
| Event↓/Date → | Mon 2 | | Tue 3 | | Wed 4 | Thu 5 | Fri 6 | Sat 7 |
|---|---|---|---|---|---|---|---|---|
| Men's C-2 1000 m | H | ¼ | ½ | F | | | | |

== Results ==
=== Heats ===
Progression System: 1st-2nd to SF, rest to QF.

==== Heat 1 ====
| Rank | Lane | Canoer | Country | Time | Notes |
|---|---|---|---|---|---|
| 1 | 6 | Liu Hao; Zheng Pengfei | China | 3:37.783 | SF |
| 2 | 5 | Serguey Torres; Fernando Jorge | Cuba | 3:39.028 | SF |
| 3 | 4 | Jacky Godmann; Isaquias Queiroz | Brazil | 3:48.378 | QF |
| 4 | 1 | Sergey Yemelyanov; Timofey Yemelyanov | Kazakhstan | 3:49.079 | QF |
| 5 | 7 | Roland Varga; Connor Fitzpatrick | Canada | 3:49.263 | QF |
| 6 | 3 | Wiktor Głazunow; Tomasz Barniak | Poland | 3:49.956 | QF |
| 7 | 2 | Balázs Adolf; Dániel Fejes | Hungary | 3:53.964 | QF |

==== Heat 2 ====
| Rank | Lane | Canoer | Country | Time | Notes |
|---|---|---|---|---|---|
| 1 | 5 | Sebastian Brendel; Tim Hecker | Germany | 3:42.774 | SF |
| 2 | 7 | Cayetano García; Pablo Martínez | Spain | 3:44.947 | SF |
| 3 | 3 | Petr Fuksa; Martin Fuksa | Czech Republic | 3:53.056 | QF |
| 4 | 4 | Viktor Melantyev; Vladislav Chebotar | ROC | 4:00.218 | QF |
| 5 | 2 | Cătălin Chirilă; Victor Mihalachi | Romania | 4:00.459 | QF |
| 6 | 6 | Pavlo Altukhov; Dmytro Ianchuk | Ukraine | 4:06.089 | QF |
| 7 | 1 | Buly Da Conceição Triste; Roque Fernandes dos Ramos | São Tomé and Príncipe | 4:34.880 | QF |

=== Quarterfinals ===
Progression: 1st-3rd to SF, rest to Final B.

==== Quarterfinal 1 ====
| Rank | Lane | Canoer | Country | Time | Notes |
|---|---|---|---|---|---|
| 1 | 5 | Jacky Godmann; Isaquias Queiroz | Brazil | 3:48.611 | SF |
| 2 | 2 | Pavlo Altukhov; Dmytro Ianchuk | Ukraine | 3:49.356 | SF |
| 3 | 3 | Cătălin Chirilă; Victor Mihalachi | Romania | 3:51.565 | SF |
| 4 | 6 | Balázs Adolf; Dániel Fejes | Hungary | 3:53.559 | FB |
| 5 | 4 | Viktor Melantyev; Vladislav Chebotar | ROC | 4:09.956 | FB |

==== Quarterfinal 2 ====
| Rank | Lane | Canoer | Country | Time | Notes |
|---|---|---|---|---|---|
| 1 | 6 | Wiktor Głazunow; Tomasz Barniak | Poland | 3:49.770 | SF |
| 2 | 5 | Petr Fuksa; Martin Fuksa | Czech Republic | 3:50.635 | SF |
| 3 | 3 | Roland Varga; Connor Fitzpatrick | Canada | 3:50.768 | SF |
| 4 | 4 | Sergey Yemelyanov; Timofey Yemelyanov | Kazakhstan | 3:55.157 | FB |
| 5 | 2 | Buly Da Conceição Triste; Roque Fernandes dos Ramos | São Tomé and Príncipe | 4:44.055 | FB |

=== Semifinals ===
Progression: 1st-4th to Final A, rest to Final B.

==== Semifinal 1 ====
| Rank | Lane | Canoer | Country | Time | Notes |
|---|---|---|---|---|---|
| 1 | 4 | Liu Hao; Zheng Pengfei | China | 3:27.023 | OB, FA |
| 2 | 2 | Cătălin Chirilă; Victor Mihalachi | Romania | 3:27.399 | FA |
| 3 | 3 | Wiktor Głazunow; Tomasz Barniak | Poland | 3:28.282 | FA |
| 4 | 5 | Cayetano García; Pablo Martínez | Spain | 3:28.594 | FA |
| 5 | 6 | Pavlo Altukhov; Dmytro Ianchuk | Ukraine | 3:28.775 | FB |

==== Semifinal 2 ====
| Rank | Lane | Canoer | Country | Time | Notes |
|---|---|---|---|---|---|
| 1 | 4 | Sebastian Brendel; Tim Hecker | Germany | 3:26.812 | OB, FA |
| 2 | 5 | Serguey Torres; Fernando Jorge | Cuba | 3:27.102 | FA |
| 3 | 2 | Roland Varga; Connor Fitzpatrick | Canada | 3:27.145 | FA |
| 4 | 3 | Jacky Godmann; Isaquias Queiroz | Brazil | 3:27.167 | FA |
| 5 | 6 | Petr Fuksa; Martin Fuksa | Czech Republic | 3:28.927 | FB |

=== Finals ===
==== Final A ====
| Rank | Lane | Canoer | Country | Time | Notes |
|---|---|---|---|---|---|
| 1st place, gold medalist(s) | 6 | Serguey Torres; Fernando Jorge | Cuba | 3:24.995 | OB |
| 2nd place, silver medalist(s) | 5 | Liu Hao; Zheng Pengfei | China | 3:25.198 | |
| 3rd place, bronze medalist(s) | 4 | Sebastian Brendel; Tim Hecker | Germany | 3:25.615 | |
| 4 | 8 | Jacky Godmann; Isaquias Queiroz | Brazil | 3:27.603 | |
| 5 | 3 | Cătălin Chirilă; Victor Mihalachi | Romania | 3:29.285 | |
| 6 | 2 | Roland Varga; Connor Fitzpatrick | Canada | 3:30.157 | |
| 7 | 7 | Wiktor Głazunow; Tomasz Barniak | Poland | 3:32.317 | |
| 8 | 1 | Cayetano García; Pablo Martínez | Spain | 3:41.572 | |

==== Final B ====
| Rank | Lane | Canoer | Country | Time | Notes |
|---|---|---|---|---|---|
| 9 | 2 | Viktor Melantyev; Vladislav Chebotar | ROC | 3:30.406 | |
| 10 | 4 | Petr Fuksa; Martin Fuksa | Czech Republic | 3:31.240 | |
| 11 | 6 | Balázs Adolf; Dániel Fejes | Hungary | 3:32.076 | |
| 12 | 3 | Sergey Yemelyanov; Timofey Yemelyanov | Kazakhstan | 3:32.873 | |
| 13 | 5 | Pavlo Altukhov; Dmytro Ianchuk | Ukraine | 3:33.330 | |
| 14 | 7 | Buly Da Conceição Triste; Roque Fernandes Dos Ramos | São Tomé and Príncipe | 4:12.075 | |
