= 2017 ICF Canoe Sprint World Championships – Men's C-4 1000 metres =

Men's C-4 1000 metres at the 2017 ICF Canoe Sprint World Championships
- Venue: Sportcentrum Račice
- Location: Račice, Czech Republic
- Dates: 27 August
- Competitors: 36 from 9 nations
- Winning time: 3:14.893

Medalists
gold medal	Sebastian Brendel; Stefan Kiraj; Jan Vandrey; Conrad Scheibner	Germany
silver medal	Piotr Kuleta; Marcin Grzybowski; Tomasz Barniak; Wiktor Głazunow	Poland
bronze medal	Denys Kamerylov; Vitaliy Vergeles; Eduard Shemetylo; Denys Kovalenko	Ukraine

The men's C-4 1000 metres competition at the 2017 ICF Canoe Sprint World Championships in Račice took place at the Sportcentrum Račice.

== Schedule ==
The schedule was as follows:

Date	Time	Round
Sunday 27 August 2017	10:09	Final

All times are Central European Summer Time (UTC+2)

== Results ==
With fewer than ten boats entered, this event was held as a direct final.

Rank	Canoeists	Country	Time
1st place, gold medalist(s)	Sebastian Brendel; Stefan Kiraj; Jan Vandrey; Conrad Scheibner	Germany	3:14.893
2nd place, silver medalist(s)	Piotr Kuleta; Marcin Grzybowski; Tomasz Barniak; Wiktor Głazunow	Poland	3:16.798
3rd place, bronze medalist(s)	Denys Kamerylov; Vitaliy Vergeles; Eduard Shemetylo; Denys Kovalenko	Ukraine	3:17.198
4	Henrik Vasbányai; Tamás Kiss; Pál Sarudi; Dávid Varga	Hungary	3:18.623
5	Cătălin Chirilă; Constantin Diba; Gabriel Gheoca; Ștefan Andrei Strat	Romania	3:19.738
6	Kirill Shamshurin; Rasul Ishmukhamedov; Ivan Likhovidov; Ilya Pervukhin	Russia	3:21.703
7	Maksim Krysko; Ivan Patapenka; Aliaksei Makhnist; Dzmitry Lapata	Belarus	3:22.858
8	Petr Fuksa; Daniel Kořínek; Simon Hajek; Radek Miškovský	Czech Republic	3:27.653
9	Drew Hodges; Craig Spence; Marc Tarling; Roland Varga	Canada	3:47.553
