= 2022 ICF Canoe Sprint World Championships – Men's C-2 1000 metres =

Men's C-2 1000 metres at the 2022 ICF Canoe Sprint World Championships
- Venue: Lake Banook
- Location: Dartmouth, Canada
- Dates: 4–7 August
- Competitors: 24 from 12 nations
- Winning time: 3:54.91

Medalists
gold medal	Sebastian Brendel; Tim Hecker	Germany
silver medal	Liu Hao; Ji Bowen	China
bronze medal	Craig Spence; Bret Himmelman	Canada

The men's C-2 1000 metres competition at the 2022 ICF Canoe Sprint World Championships in Dartmouth took place on Lake Banook.

== Schedule ==
The schedule is as follows:

Date	Time	Round
Thursday 4 August 2022	11:59	Heats
Friday 5 August 2022	15:38	Semifinal
Sunday 7 August 2022	12:21	Final

== Results ==
=== Heats ===
The fastest three boats in each heat advanced directly to the final.
The next four fastest boats in each heat, plus the fastest remaining boat advanced to the semifinal.

==== Heat 1 ====
Rank	Canoeist	Country	Time	Notes
1	Liu Hao; Ji Bowen	China	3:48.75	QF
2	Dominik Nowacki; Norman Zezula	Poland	3:51.64	QF
3	Noel Dominguez; Diego Dominguez	Spain	3:52.00	QF
4	Erlon Silva; Filipe Vieira	Brazil	3:52.63	QS
5	Viktor Svyrydiuk; Eduard Shemetylo	Ukraine	4:09.66	QS
6	Ryo Naganuma; Shuhei Hosumi	Japan	4:14.61	QS
	Nicolae Craciun; Daniele Santini	Italy	DSQ	

==== Heat 2 ====
Rank	Canoeist	Country	Time	Notes
1	Sebastian Brendel; Tim Hecker	Germany	3:48.68	QF
2	Craig Spence; Bret Himmelman	Canada	3:53.82	QF
3	Balázs Kiss; David Hodovan	Hungary	3:54.95	QF
4	Antonín Hrabal; Jiří Zalubil	Czech Republic	3:58.83	QS
5	Alejandro Rodríguez; Daniel Pacheco	Colombia	4:05.66	QS

=== Semifinal ===
The fastest three boats advanced to the final.

Rank	Canoeist	Country	Time	Notes
1	Erlon Silva; Filipe Vieira	Brazil	3:55.00	QF
2	Alejandro Rodríguez; Daniel Pacheco	Colombia	3:57.84	QF
3	Antonín Hrabal; Jiří Zalubil	Czech Republic	3:57.93	QF
4	Viktor Svyrydiuk; Eduard Shemetylo	Ukraine	3:58.01	
5	Ryo Naganuma; Shuhei Hosumi	Japan	4:08.83	

=== Final ===
Competitors raced for positions 1 to 9, with medals going to the top three.

Rank	Canoeist	Country	Time
1st place, gold medalist(s)	Sebastian Brendel; Tim Hecker	Germany	3:54.91
2nd place, silver medalist(s)	Liu Hao; Ji Bowen	China	3:55.34
3rd place, bronze medalist(s)	Craig Spence; Bret Himmelman	Canada	4:06.13
4	Noel Dominguez; Diego Dominguez	Spain	4:08.09
5	Erlon Silva; Filipe Vieira	Brazil	4:08.24
6	Antonín Hrabal; Jiří Zalubil	Czech Republic	4:09.16
7	Balázs Kiss; David Hodovan	Hungary	4:09.49
8	Alejandro Rodríguez; Daniel Pacheco	Colombia	4:18.65
9	Dominik Nowacki; Norman Zezula	Poland	4:34.93
