= 2023 ICF Canoe Sprint World Championships – Men's C-1 5000 metres =

Men's C-1 5000 metres at the 2023 ICF Canoe Sprint World Championships
- Venue: Sportpark Duisburg
- Location: Duisburg, Germany
- Dates: 27 August
- Competitors: 26 from 26 nations
- Winning time: 22:12.975

Medalists
gold medal	Balázs Adolf	Hungary
silver medal	Sebastian Brendel	Germany
bronze medal	Wiktor Głazunow	Poland

The men's C-1 1000 metres competition at the 2023 ICF Canoe Sprint World Championships in Duisburg took place in Sportpark Duisburg.

== Schedule ==
The schedule is as follows:

Date	Time	Round
Sunday 27 August 2023	14:35	Final

== Results ==
As a long-distance event, it was held as a direct final.

Rank	Canoeist	Country	Time
1st place, gold medalist(s)	Balázs Adolf	Hungary	22:12.975
2nd place, silver medalist(s)	Sebastian Brendel	Germany	22:18.883
3rd place, bronze medalist(s)	Wiktor Głazunow	Poland	22:35.386
4	Serghei Tarnovschi	Moldova	22:35.386
5	José Ramón Pelier	Cuba	22:35.386
6	Carlo Tacchini	Italy	23:18.077
7	Joosep Karlson	Estonia	23:23.356
8	Dmytro Yanchuk	Ukraine	23:34.326
9	Noel Domínguez	Spain	23:36.008
10	Jonathan Grady	United States	24:30.390
11	Daniel Pacheco	Colombia	24:41.741
12	Stefanos Dimopoulos	Greece	24:41.786
13	Jonathan Jones	United Kingdom	24:54.184
14	Mohammad Nabi Rezaei	Iran	25:08.599
15	Preslav Georgiev	Bulgaria	25:09.245
16	Manfred Pallinger	Austria	25:10.031
17	Adam Rudolf	Czech Republic	25:15.958
18	Yu Chenwei	China	26:35.164
	Ali Aldain	Iraq	DNF
	Gevorg Pilosyan	Armenia	DNF
	Oleksandr Komiahin	Romania	DNF
	Sidali Belaidi	Algeria	DSQ
	Daniel Leon	Ecuador	DSQ
	Dario Maksimovic	Luxembourg	DSQ
	Manuel Antonio	Angola	DSQ
	Niraj Verma	India	DSQ
	Muhammad Rajabov	Tajikistan	DNS
	Connor Fitzpatrick	Canada	DNS
	Edwar Paredes	Venezuela	DNS
