= Liu Hao (canoeist) =

Chinese canoeist

Personal information
- Nationality: Chinese
- Born: 6 September 1993 (age 33) Yunnan, China

Sport
- Country: China
- Sport: Sprint canoe
- Event: C-2 1000 m
Medal record
Men's canoe sprint
Representing China
Olympic Games
Gold medal – first place	2024 Paris	C-2 500 m
Silver medal – second place	2020 Tokyo	C-1 1000 m
Silver medal – second place	2020 Tokyo	C-2 1000 m
World Championships
Gold medal – first place	2019 Szeged	C-2 1000 m
Silver medal – second place	2022 Dartmouth	C-2 1000 m
Silver medal – second place	2023 Duisburg	C-2 500 m
Bronze medal – third place	2022 Dartmouth	C-2 500 m
Asian Games
Gold medal – first place	2018 Jakarta–Palembang	C-2 1000 m

Liu Hao (Chinese: 刘浩; pinyin: Liú Hào; born 6 September 1993) is a Chinese sprint canoeist.

He won a gold medal at the 2019 ICF Canoe Sprint World Championships. He also competed in the 2020 Tokyo Olympics and won the silver medals in both men's C-2 1000 metres and men's C-1 1000 metres. He also secured the gold with Ji Bowen in the men's C-2 500m at the 2024 Paris Olympics.
