= Piotr Kuleta =

Polish canoiests

Personal information
- Born: 27 June 1989 (age 37) Chrzanów, Poland
Medal record
Men's sprint canoeing
Representing Poland
World Championships
| Silver medal – second place | 2017 Račice | C-4 1000 m |
| Bronze medal – third place | 2015 Milan | C-2 1000 m |

Piotr Kuleta (born 27 June 1989 in Chrzanów) is a Polish sprint canoeist. At the 2012 Summer Olympics, he competed in the Men's C-1 200 metres and the men's C-1 1000 m. He did not originally qualify for the Olympics, but was called up when Pawel Baraszkiewicz was injured.

His uncle Tomasz Kuleta originally encouraged him to try canoeing, and then Adam Smyk, a neighbour who was also a canoe coach, encouraged him to join a canoeing club.

In 2015, he was named athlete of the year for the Opolszczyzna region. In that year, he won a bronze medal in the C-2 1000 m at the World Championships alongside Marcin Grzybowski. In 2017, he was part of the Polish men's C-4 1000 m team that won the silver medal at the World Championships with Wiktor Glazunow, Tomasz Barniak and Marcin Grzybowski. That year, the team also won the European title in the event.
