= 2021 ICF Canoe Sprint World Championships – Men's C-2 1000 metres =

Men's C-2 1000 metres at the 2021 ICF Canoe Sprint World Championships
- Venue: Lake Bagsværd
- Location: Copenhagen, Denmark
- Dates: 16–18 September
- Competitors: 22 from 11 nations
- Winning time: 3:32.83

Medalists
gold medal	Kirill Shamshurin; Vladislav Chebotar	International Olympic Committee
silver medal	Wiktor Głazunow; Tomasz Barniak	Poland
bronze medal	Serguey Torres; Fernando Jorge	Cuba

The men's C-2 1000 metres competition at the 2021 ICF Canoe Sprint World Championships in Copenhagen took place on Lake Bagsværd.

== Schedule ==
The schedule was as follows:

Date	Time	Round
Thursday 16 September 2021	14:14	Heats
Friday 17 September 2021	14:32	Semifinal
Saturday 18 September 2021	12:26	Final

All times are Central European Summer Time (UTC+2)

== Results ==
=== Heats ===
The fastest three boats in each heat advanced directly to the final.
The next four fastest boats in each heat, plus the fastest remaining boat advanced to the semifinal.

==== Heat 1 ====
Rank	Canoeists	Country	Time	Notes
1	Serguey Torres; Fernando Jorge	Cuba	4:01.01	QF
2	Roland Varga; Alix Plomteux	Canada	4:03.52	QF
3	Noel Domínguez; Manuel Fontán	Spain	4:17.21	QF
–	Baker Nsamba; Ibrahim Matovu	Uganda	DNS	
–	Xu Jiabin; Yang Qixin	China	DNS	

==== Heat 2 ====
Rank	Canoeists	Country	Time	Notes
1	Kirill Shamshurin; Vladislav Chebotar	RCF	3:57.23	QF
2	Wiktor Głazunow; Tomasz Barniak	Poland	3:58.02	QF
3	Gabriele Casadei; Mykola Vykhodtsev	Italy	4:00.08	QF
4	Ádám Slihoczki; Ádám Kocsis	Hungary	4:04.51	QS
5	Eduard Strýček; Peter Kizek	Slovakia	4:08.54	QS
–	Hermie Macaranas; John Selecio	Philippines	DNS	

=== Semifinal ===
With only two boats remaining for three spots, both were advanced to the final.

=== Final ===
Competitors raced for positions 1 to 9, with medals going to the top three.

Rank	Canoeists	Country	Time
1st place, gold medalist(s)	Kirill Shamshurin; Vladislav Chebotar	RCF	3:32.83
2nd place, silver medalist(s)	Wiktor Głazunow; Tomasz Barniak	Poland	3:34.38
3rd place, bronze medalist(s)	Serguey Torres; Fernando Jorge	Cuba	3:35.22
4	Gabriele Casadei; Mykola Vykhodtsev	Italy	3:37.68
5	Roland Varga; Alix Plomteux	Canada	3:42.18
6	Eduard Strýček; Peter Kizek	Slovakia	3:46.90
7	Ádám Slihoczki; Ádám Kocsis	Hungary	3:57.35
8	Noel Domínguez; Manuel Fontán	Spain	4:10.90
