= 2025 ICF Canoe Sprint World Championships – Men's C-1 5000 metres =

Men's C-1 5000 metres at the 2025 ICF Canoe Sprint World Championships
- Venue: Idroscalo Regatta Course
- Location: Milan, Italy
- Dates: 24 August
- Competitors: 23 from 23 nations
- Winning time: 23:41.31

Medalists
gold medal	Serghei Tarnovschi	Moldova
silver medal	Jaime Duro	Spain
bronze medal	Wiktor Głazunow	Poland

The men's C-1 5000 metres competition at the 2025 ICF Canoe Sprint World Championships in Milan took place in Idroscalo Regatta Course.

== Schedule ==
The schedule is as follows:

Date	Time	Round
Sunday 24 August 2025	14:40	Final

== Results ==
=== Final ===
As a long-distance event, it was held as a direct final.

Rank	Canoeist	Country	Time	Notes
1st place, gold medalist(s)	Serghei Tarnovschi	Moldova	23:41.31	
2nd place, silver medalist(s)	Jaime Duro	Spain	23:43.67	
3rd place, bronze medalist(s)	Wiktor Głazunow	Poland	23:53.73	
4	Balázs Adolf	Hungary	24:13.99	
5	Carlo Tacchini	Italy	24:50.51	
6	Jonathan Grady	United States	24:54.76	
7	Ilya Pervukhin	Individual Neutral Athletes	25:05.85	
8	Nurislom Tukhtasin Ugli	Uzbekistan	25:08.16	
9	Conrad-Robin Scheibner	Germany	25:20.33	
10	Ivan Patapenka	Individual Neutral Athletes	25:48.62	
11	Yurii Vandiuk	Ukraine	25:59.02	
12	Nikita Ciudin	Canada	26:10.97	
13	Amirjon Bobojonov	Tajikistan	26:14.49	
14	Martin Nováček	Czech Republic	26:26.08	
15	Thomas Lambert	Great Britain	26:29.75	
16	Polat Turebekov	Kazakhstan	26:32.25	
17	Peter Kizek	Slovakia	26:46.56	
18	Daniel Pacheco	Colombia	26:49.65	
19	Sofiyanto Sofiyanto	Indonesia	26:50.50	
20	Shuhei Hosumi	Japan	27:23.27	
21	Janus Ercilla	Philippines	27:33.85	
22	Joosep Karlson	Estonia	27:45.39	
23	Manuel Antonio	Angola	27:53.24	
