= 2022 ICF Canoe Sprint World Championships – Men's C-1 5000 metres =

Men's C-1 5000 metres at the 2022 ICF Canoe Sprint World Championships
- Venue: Lake Banook
- Location: Dartmouth, Canada
- Dates: 7 August
- Competitors: 16 from 16 nations
- Winning time: 23:37.85

Medalists
gold medal	Serghei Tarnovschi	Moldova
silver medal	Serguey Madrigal	Cuba
bronze medal	Sebastian Brendel	Germany

The men's C-1 5000 metres competition at the 2022 ICF Canoe Sprint World Championships in Dartmouth took place on Lake Banook.

== Schedule ==
The schedule is as follows:

Date	Time	Round
Sunday 7 August 2022	15:15	Final

== Results ==
As a long-distance event, it was held as a direct final.

Rank	Canoeist	Country	Time
1st place, gold medalist(s)	Serghei Tarnovschi	Moldova	23:37.85
2nd place, silver medalist(s)	Serguey Madrigal	Cuba	23:37.94
3rd place, bronze medalist(s)	Sebastian Brendel	Germany	23:55.18
4	Carlo Tacchini	Italy	24:09.00
5	Balázs Adolf	Hungary	24:47.57
6	Joosep Karlson	Estonia	24:58.61
7	Ian Ross	United States	KO
8	Peter Bradley	Canada	KO
9	Matej Rusnák	Slovakia	KO
10	Filipe Vieira	Brazil	KO
11	Yurii Vandiuk	Ukraine	KO
	Dominik Nowacki	Poland	DNF
	Manuel Garrido	Spain	DNS
