= Canoeing at the 2026 Asian Games – Men's C-1 500 metres =

Men's C-1 500 metres at the 2026 Asian Games
- Venue: Miyoshi Lake
- Date: 25 September 2026
- Competitors: 8 from 8 nations

Medalists
gold medal	Ji Bowen	China
silver medal	Vladlen Denisov	Uzbekistan
bronze medal	Lai Kuan-chieh	Chinese Taipei

The men's sprint C-1 (canoe single) 500 metres competition at the 2026 Asian Games was held on 25 September 2026.

== Schedule ==
All times are Japan Standard Time (UTC+09:00)

Date	Time	Event
Friday, 25 September 2026	11:50	Final

== Results ==
=== Final ===
Rank	Athlete	Time	Notes
1st place, gold medalist(s)	Ji Bowen (CHN)	1:47.338	
2nd place, silver medalist(s)	Vladlen Denisov (UZB)	1:47.945	
3rd place, bronze medalist(s)	Lai Kuan-chieh (TPE)	1:49.042	
4	Hwang Seon-hong (KOR)	1:50.221	
5	Ryo Naganuma (JPN)	1:50.270	
6	Mohammad Nabi Rezaei (IRI)	1:51.867	
7	Shahriyor Daminov (TJK)	1:54.916	
8	Evans Monim (INA)	1:58.042	
