= Canoeing at the 2014 Central American and Caribbean Games =

Canoening at the 2014 Central American and Caribbean Games
- Venue: Rio Tuxpan Canoeing Track
- Location: Veracruz, Mexico
- Dates: 15–17 November

The Canoeing competition at the 2014 Central American and Caribbean Games was held in Veracruz, Mexico.

The tournament was scheduled to be held from 15–17 November at the Rio Tuxpan Canoeing Track.

== Medal summary ==
=== Men's events ===
Event	Gold	Silver	Bronze
K1 200 m	Fidel Vargas (CUB)	Antonio Oropeza (VEN)	Santos Marroquin Uribe (MEX)
K2 200 m	Cuba (CUB); Reinier Torres; Fidel Vargas	Venezuela (VEN); Antonio Oropeza; José Giovanni Ramos	Mexico (MEX); Santos Marroquin Uribe; Jordan Salazar
K1 1000 m	Jesus Valdez Gonzalez (MEX)	Jorge Garcia Rodriguez (CUB)	José Giovanni Ramos (VEN)
K2 1000 m	Cuba (CUB); Jorge Garcia Rodriguez; Reinier Torres	Mexico (MEX); Jesus Valdez Gonzalez; Javier Lopez Quintero	Venezuela (VEN); Ray Acuna; Jesus Colmenarez
K4 1000 m	Mexico (MEX); Osbaldo Fuentes Juarez; Javier Lopez Quintero; Jordan Salazar; Jesus Valdez Gonzalez	Cuba (CUB); Hector Bouza; Jorge Garcia Rodriguez; Alex Menendez; Reinier Torres	Venezuela (VEN); Ray Acuna; Jesus Colmenarez; Antonio Oropeza; José Giovanni Ramos
C1 200 m	Sergio Díaz (COL)	Roleysi Baez Avila (CUB)	Ronny Ratia (VEN)
C1 1000 m	Serguey Torres (CUB)	Jose Cristobal Quirino (MEX)	Sergio Díaz (COL)
C2 1000 m	Cuba (CUB); Roleysi Baez Avila; Serguey Torres	Mexico (MEX); Jose Camilo Cortes; Jose Cristobal Quirino	Venezuela (VEN); Edwar Paredes; Jose Solano

=== Women's events ===
Event	Gold	Silver	Bronze
K1 200 m	Yusmari Mengana (CUB)	Tatiana Muñoz (COL)	Maricela Montemayor (MEX)
K1 500 m	Yusmari Mengana (CUB)	Tatiana Muñoz (COL)	Denisse Olivella Gonzalez (MEX)
K2 500 m	Mexico (MEX); Karina Alanis; Maricela Montemayor	Cuba (CUB); Yusmari Mengana; Daylen Rodriguez	Colombia (COL); Tatiana Muñoz; Ruth Niño
C1 200 m	Amalia Obregon (CUB)	Abigail Morales Cazarez (MEX)	Clara Lopez Montesdeoca (GUA)

== Medal table ==
* Host nation (Mexico)

Rank	Nation	Gold	Silver	Bronze	Total
1	Cuba (CUB)	8	4	0	12
2	Mexico (MEX)*	3	4	4	11
3	Colombia (COL)	1	2	2	5
4	Venezuela (VEN)	0	2	5	7
5	Guatemala (GUA)	0	0	1	1
Totals (5 entries)		12	12	12	36
