= Marcin Grzybowski =

Polish canoeist

Medal record

Men's canoe sprint

Representing Poland
Event	1st	2nd	3rd
Olympic Games	0	0	0
World Championships	0	3	2
European Championships	1	2	3
European Games	0	0	0
Total	1	5	5

World Championships
Silver medal – second place	2003 Gainesville	C-4 500 m
Silver medal – second place	2006 Szeged	C-4 500 m
Silver medal – second place	2017 Račice	C-4 1000 m
Bronze medal – third place	2002 Seville	C-4 500 m
Bronze medal – third place	2015 Milan	C-2 1000 m

European Championships
Gold medal – first place	2006 Račice	C-2 1000 m
Silver medal – second place	2007 Pontevedra	C-4 500 m
Silver medal – second place	2013 Montemor-o-Velho	C-1 5000 m
Bronze medal – third place	2001 Milan	C-4 500 m
Bronze medal – third place	2013 Montemor-o-Velho	C-1 500 m
Bronze medal – third place	2013 Montemor-o-Velho	C-1 1000 m

Marcin Grzybowski (born 10 January 1979) is a Polish sprint and marathon canoeist who has competed since the early 2000s. He won three medals in the C-4 500 m event at the ICF Canoe Sprint World Championships with two silvers (2003, 2006), and a bronze (2002).

Grzybowski also competed in the C-1 1000 m event at the 2008 Summer Olympics in Beijing, but was eliminated in the semifinals. At the 2012 Summer Olympics, he competed in the C-2 1000 m with Tomasz Kaczor, again being eliminated in the semi-finals.
