= Jan Vandrey =

German sprint canoeist (born 1991)

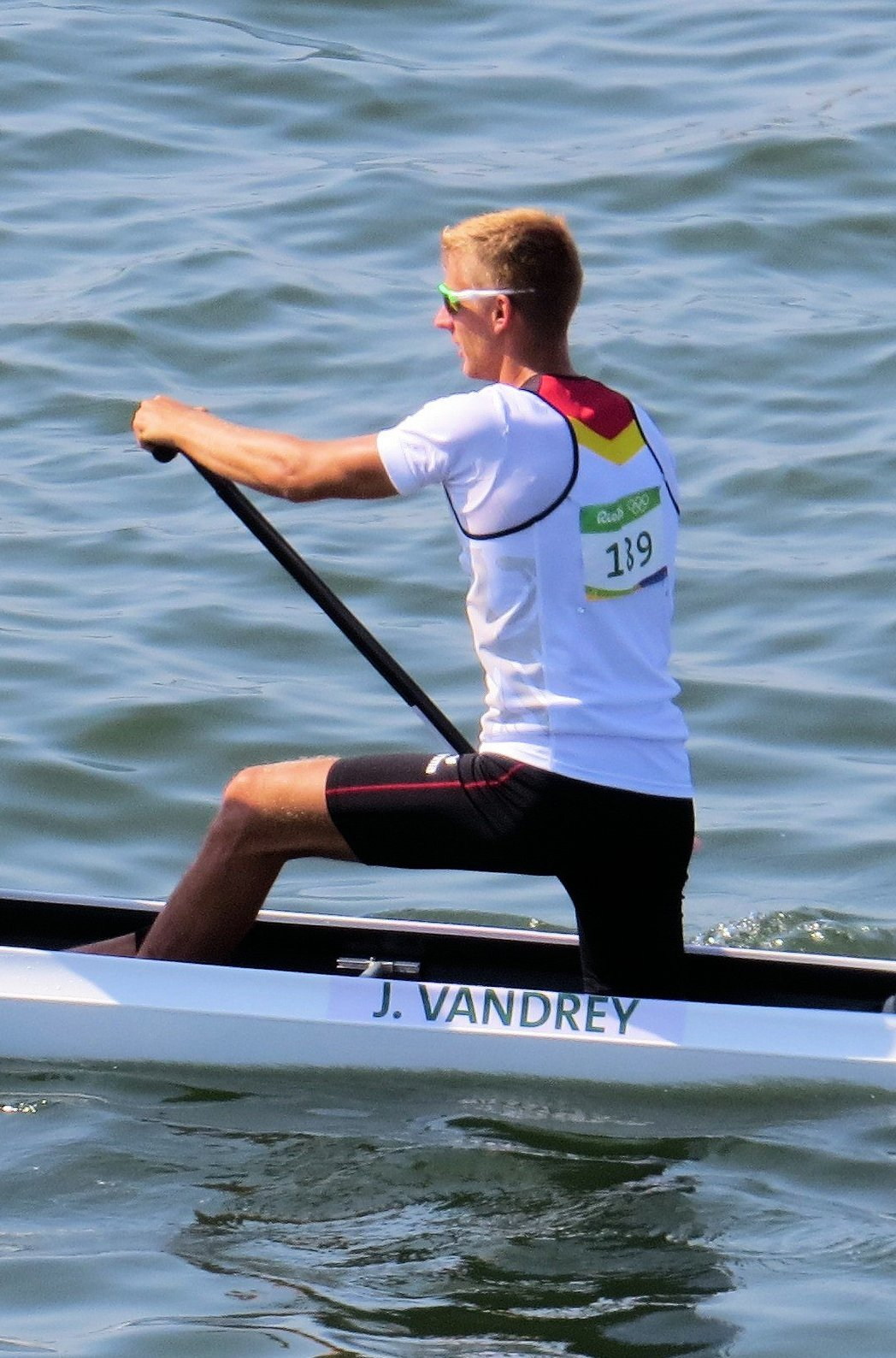
- Vandrey in 2016

Personal information
- Nationality: German
- Born: 11 December 1991 (age 34) Schwedt, Germany
- Height: 188 cm (6 ft 2 in)
- Weight: 88 kg (194 lb)

Sport
- Country: Germany
- Sport: Canoe sprint
- Event(s): C-2 1000 m, C-4 500 m, C-4 1000 m
- Club: KC Potsdam
Medal record
Men's canoe sprint
Representing Germany
Olympic Games
Gold medal – first place	2016 Rio de Janeiro	C-2 1000 m
World Championships
Gold medal – first place	2017 Račice	C-4 1000 m
Silver medal – second place	2019 Szeged	C-4 500 m
European Championships
Silver medal – second place	2017 Plovdiv	C-4 1000 m

Jan Vandrey (born 11 December 1991) is a German sprint canoeist.

He competed at the 2016 Summer Olympics in Rio de Janeiro, in the men's C-2 1000 metres. He won the gold medal with teammate Sebastian Brendel.
