= Wiktor Głazunow =

Polish canoeist (born 1993)

Personal information
- Nationality: Polish
- Born: 24 October 1993 (age 32)
- Height: 1.73 m (5 ft 8 in)

Sport
- Country: Poland
- Sport: Canoe sprint
- Club: AZS AWF Gorzow
- Coached by: Marek Zachara
Medal record
Men's canoe sprint
Representing Poland
World Championships
Gold medal – first place	2024 Samarkand	C-1 5000 m
Silver medal – second place	2015 Milan	C-2 500 m
Silver medal – second place	2017 Račice	C-4 1000 m
Silver medal – second place	2021 Copenhagen	C-2 1000 m
Silver medal – second place	2022 Dartmouth	C-2 500 m
Silver medal – second place	2022 Dartmouth	C-4 500 m
Silver medal – second place	2023 Duisburg	C-4 500 m
Silver medal – second place	2023 Duisburg	C-2 Mix 500 m
Bronze medal – third place	2023 Duisburg	C-1 5000 m
Bronze medal – third place	2025 Milan	C-1 5000 m
European Championships
Silver medal – second place	2022 Munich	C-2 500 m
Silver medal – second place	2024 Szeged	C-2 500 m
Silver medal – second place	2025 Racice	C-1 5000 m
Bronze medal – third place	2018 Belgrade	C-4 500 m
Bronze medal – third place	2026 Montemor-o-Velho	C-1 5000 m

Wiktor Głazunow (born 24 October 1993) is a Polish sprint canoeist. He competed at the 2020 and 2024 Summer Olympics, in the men's C-2 1000 metres and C-1 1000 metres events,.

== Major results ==
=== Olympic Games ===
Year	C-1 1000	C-2 500	C-2 1000
2020	5 FB	—N/a	7
2024	6		—N/a

=== World championships ===
Year	C-1 200	C-1 500	C-1 1000	C-1 5000	C-2 200	C-2 500	C-2 1000	C-4 500	C-4 1000	XC-2 500
2015					5	2nd place, silver medalist(s)		—N/a		—N/a
2017						4		—N/a	2nd place, silver medalist(s)	—N/a
2018	4 SF		7 FB						—N/a	—N/a
2019		4		10				9	—N/a	—N/a
2021	—N/a				—N/a	4	2nd place, silver medalist(s)		—N/a	—N/a
2022			7		—N/a	2nd place, silver medalist(s)		2nd place, silver medalist(s)	—N/a	
2023			4	3rd place, bronze medalist(s)	—N/a			2nd place, silver medalist(s)	—N/a	2nd place, silver medalist(s)
2024		5	—N/a	1st place, gold medalist(s)	—N/a	—N/a	DSQ H	—N/a	—N/a	
