= Tomasz Barniak =

Polish canoeist

Personal information
- Nationality: Polish
- Born: 6 March 1995 (age 31)
- Height: 1.73 m (5 ft 8 in)

Sport
- Country: Poland
- Sport: Canoe sprint
Medal record
Men's canoe sprint
Representing Poland
World Championships
Silver medal – second place	2017 Račice	C-4 1000 m
Silver medal – second place	2021 Copenhagen	C-2 1000 m
Silver medal – second place	2022 Dartmouth	C-2 500 m
Silver medal – second place	2023 Duisburg	C-4 500 m
European Championships
Silver medal – second place	2022 Munich	C-2 500 m

Tomasz Barniak (born 6 March 1995) is a Polish sprint canoeist. He competed in the men's C-2 1000 metres event at the 2020 Summer Olympics.
