= 2023 ICF Canoe Sprint World Championships =

- Venue: Sportpark Duisburg
- Location: Duisburg, Germany
- Dates: 23–27 August

The 2023 ICF Canoe Sprint World Championships were held from 23 to 27 August 2023 in Duisburg, Germany. They served as the main global qualification event for the 2024 Summer Olympics.

== Canoe sprint ==
=== Medal table ===
* Host nation (Germany)

Rank	Nation	Gold	Silver	Bronze	Total
1	Germany*	3	5	6	14
2	Spain	3	5	5	13
3	Canada	3	2	2	7
4	China	3	1	3	7
5	New Zealand	3	0	0	3
6	Hungary	2	5	3	10
7	Portugal	2	1	1	4
8	Denmark	2	1	0	3
9	Poland	1	5	3	9
10	Australia	1	3	0	4
11	Romania	1	1	1	3
12	Chile	1	0	1	2
12	Italy	1	0	1	2
14	Cuba	1	0	0	1
14	Czech Republic	1	0	0	1
14	Lithuania	1	0	0	1
14	Uzbekistan	1	0	0	1
18	Georgia	0	1	0	1
19	Ukraine	0	0	2	2
20	Moldova	0	0	1	1
20	Sweden	0	0	1	1
Totals (21 entries)		30	30	30	90

=== Men ===
Non-Olympic classes

==== Canoe ====
Event	Gold		Silver		Bronze	
C–1 200 m	Artur Guliev; Uzbekistan	38.729	Joan Antoni Moreno; Spain	38.769	Oleksii Koliadych; Poland	39.046
C–1 500 m	Cătălin Chirilă; Romania	1:45.373	Conrad-Robin Scheibner; Germany	1:45.723	Serghei Tarnovschi; Moldova	1:46.746
C–1 1000 m	Martin Fuksa; Czech Republic	3:45.124	Cătălin Chirilă; Romania	3:45.958	Sebastian Brendel; Germany	3:46.581
C–1 5000 m	Balázs Adolf; Hungary	22:12.975	Sebastian Brendel; Germany	22:18.883	Wiktor Głazunow; Poland	22:35.386
C–2 500 m	Germany; Peter Kretschmer; Tim Hecker	1:36.972	China; Liu Hao; Ji Bowen	1:38.126	Spain; Cayetano García; Pablo Martínez	1:38.571
C–2 1000 m	Italy; Nicolae Craciun; Daniele Santini	3:34.565	Germany; Moritz Adam; Nico Pickert	3:35.296	Romania; Ilie Sprîncean; Oleg Nuţă	3:36.490
C–4 500 m	Spain; Joan Antoni Moreno; Pablo Graña; Manuel Fontán; Adrián Sieiro	1:30.808	Poland; Aleksander Kitewski; Tomasz Barniak; Wiktor Głazunow; Norman Zezula	1:32.373	Ukraine; Vitaliy Vergeles; Andrii Rybachok; Dmytro Ianchuk; Taras Mishchuk	1:32.725

==== Kayak ====
Event	Gold		Silver		Bronze	
K–1 200 m	Artūras Seja; Lithuania	35.243	Badri Kavelashvili; Georgia	35.364	Carlos Garrote; Spain	35.380
K–1 500 m	Bálint Kopasz; Hungary	1:36.262	Jean van der Westhuyzen; Australia	1:36.632	Fernando Pimenta; Portugal	1:36.908
K–1 1000 m	Fernando Pimenta; Portugal	3:27.712	Ádám Varga; Hungary	3:28.141	Jakob Thordsen; Germany	3:28.303
K–1 5000 m	Mads Pedersen; Denmark	19:55.467	Fernando Pimenta; Portugal	20:09.974	Nico Paufler; Germany	20:36.042
K–2 500 m	Portugal; João Ribeiro; Messias Baptista	1:29.037	Hungary; Bence Nádas; Bálint Kopasz	1:29.184	Spain; Adrián del Río; Rodrigo Germade	1:29.389
K–2 1000 m	Spain; Pedro Vázquez; Íñigo Peña	3:11.512	Hungary; Bence Vajda; Tamás Szántói-Szabó	3:12.366	Germany; Anton Winkelmann; Leonard Busch	3:13.550
K–4 500 m	Germany; Max Rendschmidt; Max Lemke; Jacob Schopf; Tom Liebscher	1:19.183	Hungary; Bence Nádas; Kolos Csizmadia; István Kuli; Sándor Tótka	1:19.570	Ukraine; Oleh Kukharyk; Dmytro Danylenko; Ihor Trunov; Ivan Semykin	1:19.631

=== Women ===
Non-Olympic classes

==== Canoe ====
Event	Gold		Silver		Bronze	
C–1 200 m	Yarisleidis Cirilo; Cuba	44.799	Antía Jácome; Spain	45.418	Lin Wenjun; China	45.623
C–1 500 m	Katie Vincent; Canada	2:01.545	María Corbera; Spain	2:02.860	María Mailliard; Chile	2:03.218
C–1 1000 m	María Mailliard; Chile	4:24.958	Jacy Grant; Canada	4:26.955	Li Li; China	4:27.113
C–1 5000 m	Katie Vincent; Canada	25:57.255	Zsófia Kisbán; Hungary	26:04.048	Li Li; China	26:51.612
C–2 200 m	China; Shuai Changwen; Lin Wenjun	42.516	Spain; Antía Jácome; María Corbera	42.760	Germany; Lisa Jahn; Hedi Kliemke	43.623
C–2 500 m	China; Xu Shixiao; Sun Mengya	1:52.775	Spain; Antía Jácome; María Corbera	1:52.916	Canada; Sloan MacKenzie; Katie Vincent	1:52.956
C–4 500 m	China; Shuai Changwen; Lin Wenjun; Li Li; Wan Yin	1:47.186	Germany; Lisa Jahn; Hedi Kliemke; Annika Loske; Ophelia Preller	1:47.780	Canada; Sophia Jensen; Sloan MacKenzie; Jacy Grant; Julia Lilley	1:48.143

==== Kayak ====
Event	Gold		Silver		Bronze	
K–1 200 m	Lisa Carrington; New Zealand	38.932	Yale Steinepreis; Australia	40.010	Dominika Putto; Poland	40.367
K–1 500 m	Lisa Carrington; New Zealand	1:47.769	Emma Jørgensen; Denmark	1:49.102	Tamara Csipes; Hungary	1:50.699
K–1 1000 m	Alyssa Bull; Australia	3:54.864	Justyna Iskrzycka; Poland	3:56.663	Eszter Rendessy; Hungary	3:57.556
K–1 5000 m	Estefanía Fernández; Spain	22:45.357	Madeline Schmidt; Canada	22:46.612	Melina Andersson; Sweden	22:56.996
K–2 200 m	Poland; Martyna Klatt; Helena Wiśniewska	36.681	Germany; Paulina Paszek; Jule Hake	36.877	Hungary; Blanka Kiss; Anna Lucz	37.302
K–2 500 m	Denmark; Emma Jørgensen; Frederikke Matthiesen	1:39.856	Poland; Martyna Klatt; Helena Wiśniewska	1:40.824	Germany; Paulina Paszek; Jule Hake	1:41.597
K–4 500 m	New Zealand; Lisa Carrington; Alicia Hoskin; Olivia Brett; Tara Vaughan	1:30.606	Poland; Karolina Naja; Anna Puławska; Adrianna Kąkol; Dominika Putto	1:31.320	Spain; Sara Ouzande; Estefania Fernández; Carolina García Otero; Teresa Portela	1:31.955

==== Mixed ====
Event	Gold		Silver		Bronze	
XC–2 500 m	Canada; Connor Fitzpatrick; Katie Vincent	1:45.771	Poland; Wiktor Głazunow; Sylwia Szczerbińska	1:46.219	Italy; Olympia Della Giustina; Daniele Santini	1:47.663
XK–2 500 m	Germany; Lena Röhlings; Jacob Schopf	1:33.033	Australia; Alyssa Bull; Jackson Collins	1:33.179	Spain; Bárbara Pardo; Íñigo Peña	1:33.912

== Paracanoe ==
=== Medal table ===
* Host nation (Germany)

Rank	Nation	Gold	Silver	Bronze	Total
1	Great Britain	4	3	0	7
2	Australia	3	0	2	5
3	Ukraine	2	1	0	3
4	Brazil	1	1	3	5
5	Hungary	1	0	1	2
5	Italy	1	0	1	2
7	Canada	0	2	1	3
8	France	0	2	0	2
9	Chile	0	1	1	2
10	India	0	1	0	1
10	Spain	0	1	0	1
12	Algeria	0	0	1	1
12	Poland	0	0	1	1
12	United States	0	0	1	1
Totals (14 entries)		12	12	12	36

=== Medal events ===
Non-Paralympic classes

Event	Gold		Silver		Bronze	
Men's KL1	Péter Pál Kiss; Hungary	45.193	Rémy Boullé; France	46.036	Luis Cardoso da Silva; Brazil	46.542
Men's KL2	Curtis McGrath; Australia	40.200	Mykola Syniuk; Ukraine	41.614	Federico Mancarella; Italy	41.658
Men's KL3	Dylan Littlehales; Australia	40.050	Jonathan Young; Great Britain	40.200	Brahim Guendouz; Algeria	40.492
Men's VL1	Benjamin Sainsbury; Australia	1:02.735	David González; Spain	1:05.932	Carlos Glenndel Moreira; Brazil	1:06.086
Men's VL2	Fernando Rufino de Paulo; Brazil	50.344	Igor Tofalini; Brazil	51.299	Steven Haxton; United States	52.089
Men's VL3	Vladyslav Yepifanov; Ukraine	48.238	Jack Eyers; Great Britain	48.602	Curtis McGrath; Australia	48.879
Women's KL1	Maryna Mazhula; Ukraine	51.824	Katherinne Wollermann; Chile	53.571	Brianna Hennessy; Canada	53.800
Women's KL2	Charlotte Henshaw; Great Britain	48.706	Emma Wiggs; Great Britain	49.690	Katalin Varga; Hungary	50.808
Women's KL3	Laura Sugar; Great Britain	45.418	Nelia Barbosa; France	47.028	Felicia Laberer; Germany	47.190
Women's VL1	Viktoryia Shablova; Italy	1:10.952	Pooja Ojha; India	1:18.736	Jocelyn Muñoz; Chile	1:19.618
Women's VL2	Emma Wiggs; Great Britain	57.100	Brianna Hennessy; Canada	58.766	Susan Seipel; Australia	59.232
Women's VL3	Hope Gordon; Great Britain	56.199	Erica Scarff; Canada	57.582	Mari Santilli; Brazil	59.232
