= Peter Kretschmer =

German canoeist (born 1992)

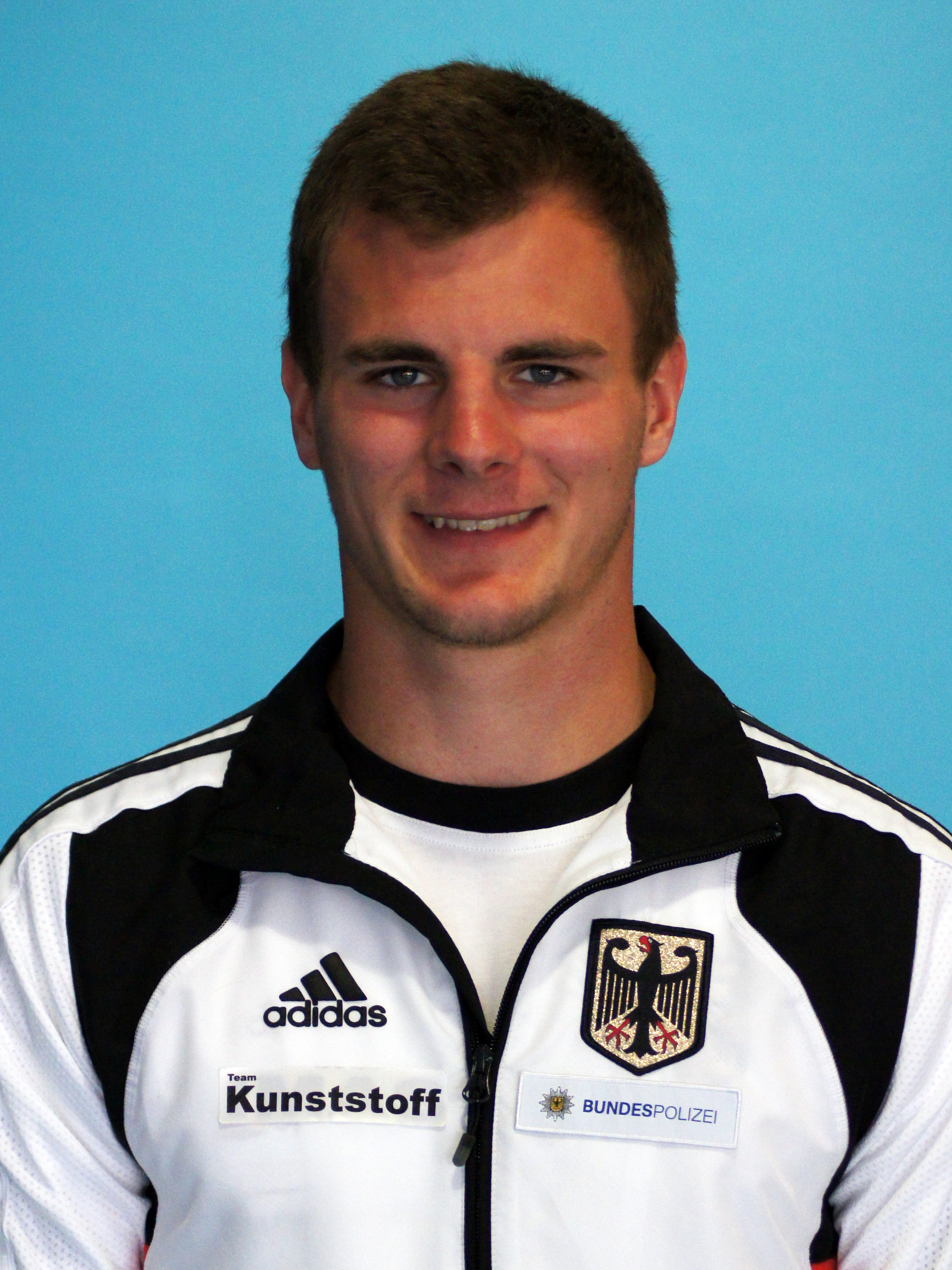

Personal information
- Nationality: German
- Born: 15 February 1992 (age 34) Schwerin, Germany
- Height: 1.75 m (5 ft 9 in)
- Weight: 70 kg (154 lb)

Sport
- Country: Germany
- Sport: Canoe sprint
- Club: SC DHfK Leipzig
Medal record
Representing Germany
Men's canoe sprint
Olympic Games
Gold medal – first place	2012 London	C-2 1000 m
World Championships
Gold medal – first place	2013 Duisburg	C-4 1000 m
Gold medal – first place	2017 Račice	C-2 1000 m
Gold medal – first place	2018 Montemor-o-Velho	C-2 1000 m
Gold medal – first place	2023 Duisburg	C-2 500 m
Bronze medal – third place	2011 Szeged	C-2 500 m

Peter Kretschmer (born 15 February 1992) is a German sprint canoer who won an Olympic gold medal in the men's C-2 1000 metre event at the 2012 Summer Olympics. He has also won four World Championship gold medals.

== Canoe career ==
Kretschmer was born in Schwerin in 1992, and trains at SC DHfK Leipzig at club level.

At the 2011 World Championships, he won a bronze in the C-2 500 m event.

He won the gold medal in the 2012 Summer Olympics in C-2 1000 metres category event for his country with Kurt Kuschela. He also won a silver medal at the European Championships in the same event.

In 2013 and 2014, he competed in the World and European Championships, winning gold in the men's C-4 1000 meters at the 2013 World Championships (with Kuschela, Erik Leue and Erik Rebstock).

In June 2015, he competed in the inaugural European Games, in canoe sprint, more specifically, Men's C-2 1000m with Michael Mueller. He earned a bronze medal. He also competed in the same event at the 2015 World Championships.

Kretschmer won gold in the C-2 1000 m at the 2017 World Championship (with Yul Oeltze) and 2017 European Championships.

In 2018, he won the C-2 1000 m at the World Championships (with Oeltze), and competed in the C-2 500 m. He competed in the same events at the 2018 European Championships, also winning gold in the C-2 1000 m.

He also competed at the 2019 World Championships and 2019 European Games.

At the 2023 World Championships, he won gold in the C-2 500 m (with Tim Hecker) and silver in the C-1 200 m, and he competed at the 2023 European Games.

At the 2024 Olympics, he competed in the C-2 500 m.
