= Pablo Martínez (canoeist) =

Spanish canoeist

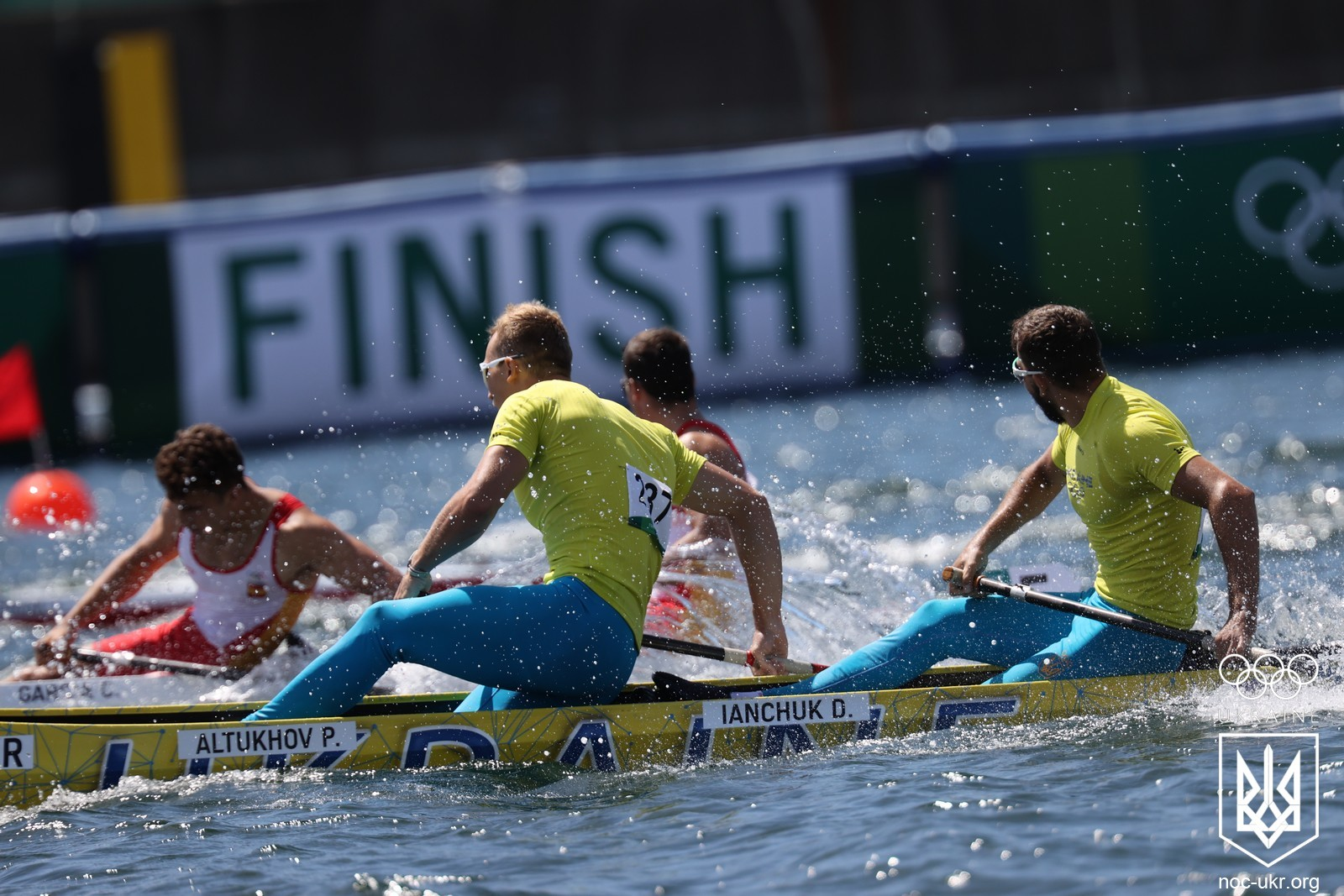

Personal information
- Full name: Pablo Martínez Estévez
- Born: 12 December 1997 (age 28) Seville, Spain
- Height: 1.74 m (5 ft 9 in)

Sport
- Country: Spain
- Sport: Canoe sprint
Medal record
World Championships
Gold medal – first place	2022 Dartmouth	C-2 500 m
Bronze medal – third place	2023 Duisburg	C-2 500 m
Bronze medal – third place	2026 Poznań	C-4 500 m
European Games
Silver medal – second place	2023 Kraków-Małopolska	C-2 500 m

Pablo Martínez Estévez (Note: In this Spanish name, the first or paternal surname is Martínez and the second or maternal family name is Estévez.) (born 12 December 1997) is a Spanish canoeist. He competed in the men's C-2 1000 metres event at the 2020 Summer Olympics.
