= Vladislav Chebotar =

Russian canoeist (born 1997)

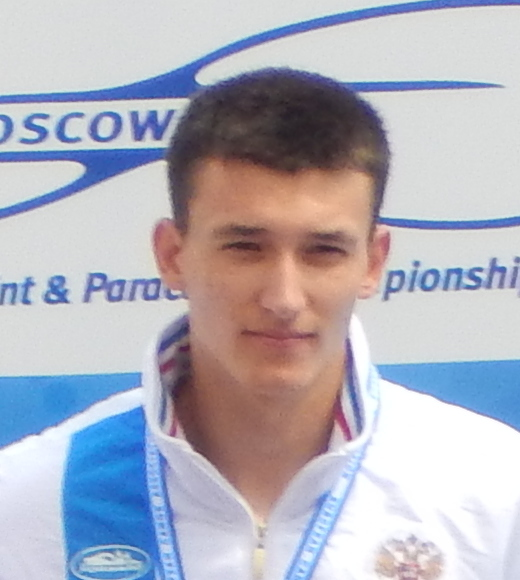
- Chebotar in 2016

Personal information
- Nationality: Russian
- Born: 22 February 1997 (age 29) Tiraspol, Moldova
- Height: 1.90 m (6 ft 3 in)
- Weight: 81 kg (179 lb)

Sport
- Country: Russia
- Sport: Canoe sprint
- Event(s): C-2 500 m, C-2 1000 m
- Club: College of Olympic Reserve number 2
Medal record
Men's canoe sprint
Representing Russia
World Championships
Gold medal – first place	2021 Copenhagen	C-2 1000 m
Silver medal – second place	2018 Montemor-o-Velho	C-2 500 m
Bronze medal – third place	2017 Račice	C-2 1000 m
Bronze medal – third place	2021 Copenhagen	C-2 500 m
European Championships
Gold medal – first place	2015 Račice	C-4 1000 m
Gold medal – first place	2016 Moscow	C-4 1000 m
Gold medal – first place	2021 Poznań	C-2 500 m
Silver medal – second place	2017 Plovdiv	C-2 1000 m

Vladislav Vasilievich Chebotar (Russian: Владислав Васильевич Чеботарь; born 22 February 1997) is a Russian sprint canoeist. He participated at the 2018 ICF Canoe Sprint World Championships.
