= 2017 ICF Canoe Sprint World Championships =

43rd edition of the ICF Canoe Sprint World Championships

- Venue: Sportcentrum Račice
- Location: Račice, Czech Republic
- Start date: 23 August
- End date: 27 August

The 2017 ICF Canoe Sprint World Championships, the 43rd edition of the World Championships, were held in Račice, Czech Republic, from 23 to 27 August 2017.

== Explanation of events ==
Canoe sprint competitions are contested in either a Canadian canoe (C), an open canoe with a single-blade paddle, or in a kayak (K), a closed canoe with a double-bladed paddle. Each canoe or kayak can hold one person (1), two people (2), or four people (4). For each of the specific canoes or kayaks, such as a K-1 (kayak single), the competition distances can be 200, 500, 1000 or 5000 metres. When a competition is listed as a K-2 500m event, for example, it means two people are in a kayak competing over a distance of 500 metres.

Paracanoe competitions are contested in either a va'a (V), an outrigger canoe (which includes a second pontoon) with a single-blade paddle, or in a kayak (as above). All international competitions are held over 200 metres in single-man boats, with three event classes in both types of vessel for men and women depending on the level of an athlete's impairment. The lower the classification number, the more severe the impairment is – for example, VL1 is a va'a competition for those with particularly severe impairments.

== Canoe sprint ==
=== Medal table ===
Rank	Nation	Gold	Silver	Bronze	Total
1	Germany	6	5	1	12
2	Hungary	5	2	2	9
3	Russia	2	2	2	6
4	Czech Republic	2	1	3	6
5	New Zealand	2	1	1	4
6	Belarus	2	0	4	6
7	Australia	2	0	0	2
7	Canada	2	0	0	2
9	Spain	1	2	0	3
10	Portugal	1	1	0	2
11	Great Britain	1	0	3	4
12	Serbia	1	0	2	3
13	Poland	0	2	2	4
14	Denmark	0	2	1	3
14	Italy	0	2	1	3
16	Cuba	0	2	0	2
17	Georgia	0	1	0	1
17	Latvia	0	1	0	1
17	Romania	0	1	0	1
17	Slovakia	0	1	0	1
17	Sweden	0	1	0	1
22	Slovenia	0	0	2	2
22	Ukraine	0	0	2	2
24	Brazil	0	0	1	1
24	Iran	0	0	1	1
Totals (25 entries)		27	27	28	82

=== Men's events ===
Non-Olympic classes

==== Canoe ====
Event	Gold		Silver		Bronze	
C–1 200 m	Artsem Kozyr; Belarus	38.161	Zaza Nadiradze; Georgia	38.439	Adel Mojallali; Iran	38.605
C–1 500 m	Martin Fuksa; Czech Republic	1:49.725	Carlo Tacchini; Italy	1:50.309	Maksim Piatrou; Belarus	1:50.583
C–1 1000 m	Sebastian Brendel; Germany	3:50.503	Martin Fuksa; Czech Republic	3:51.303	Isaquias Queiroz; Brazil	3:52.542
C–1 5000 m	Sebastian Brendel; Germany	23:34.796	Serguey Torres; Cuba	23:37.312	Mateusz Kamiński; Poland	23:42.522
C–2 200 m	Russia; Ivan Shtyl; Alexander Kovalenko	36.088	Poland; Michał Łubniewski; Arsen Śliwiński	36.673	Hungary; Ádám Fekete; Jonatán Hajdu	36.762
C–2 500 m	Russia; Ivan Shtyl; Viktor Melantyev	1:38.868	Romania; Victor Mihalachi; Leonid Carp	1:39.796	Italy; Sergiu Craciun; Nicolae Craciun	1:39.979
C–2 1000 m	Germany; Peter Kretschmer; Yul Oeltze	3:31.613	Cuba; Serguey Torres; Fernando Enriquez	3:31.955	Russia; Viktor Melantyev; Vladislav Chebotar	3:33.123
C–4 1000 m	Germany; Sebastian Brendel; Stefan Kiraj; Jan Vandrey; Conrad Scheibner	3:14.893	Poland; Piotr Kuleta; Marcin Grzybowski; Tomasz Barniak; Wiktor Głazunow	3:16.798	Ukraine; Denys Kamerylov; Vitaliy Vergeles; Eduard Shemetylo; Denys Kovalenko	3:17.198

==== Kayak ====
Event	Gold		Silver		Bronze	
K–1 200 m (Note: Bence Horváth of Hungary, who originally clocked 34.070 for silver, was disqualified on 25 March 2018 after it emerged he tested positive for EPO on 12 June 2017.)	Liam Heath; Great Britain	33.733	Aleksejs Rumjancevs; Latvia	34.439	Evgenii Lukantsov; Russia	34.639
K–1 500 m	Josef Dostál; Czech Republic	1:36.520	René Holten Poulsen; Denmark	1:38.267	Oleh Kukharyk; Ukraine	1:38.483
K–1 1000 m	Tom Liebscher; Germany	3:27.754	Fernando Pimenta; Portugal	3:27.993	Josef Dostál; Czech Republic	3:28.576
K–1 5000 m	Fernando Pimenta; Portugal	20:46.907	Max Hoff; Germany	20:50.259	Aleh Yurenia; Belarus	21:00.828
K–2 200 m	Hungary; Balázs Birkás; Márk Balaska	30.912	Spain; Cristian Toro; Carlos Garrote	31.278	Serbia; Marko Novaković; Nebojša Grujić	31.451
K–2 500 m	Spain; Rodrigo Germade; Marcus Walz	1:27.979	Hungary; Bence Nádas; Sándor Tótka	1:29.107	Belarus; Raman Piatrushenka; Vitaliy Bialko	1:29.518
K–2 1000 m	Serbia; Milenko Zorić; Marko Tomićević	3:08.647	Slovakia; Peter Gelle; Adam Botek	3:10.725	Czech Republic; Daniel Havel; Jakub Špicar	3:10.853
K–4 500 m	Germany; Tom Liebscher; Ronald Rauhe; Max Rendschmidt; Max Lemke	1:17.734 WB	Spain; Rodrigo Germade; Cristian Toro; Carlos Garrote; Marcus Walz	1:18.371	Czech Republic; Daniel Havel; Jan Štěrba; Jakub Špicar; Radek Šlouf	1:18.729
K–4 1000 m	Australia; Kenny Wallace; Jordan Wood; Riley Fitzsimmons; Murray Stewart	2:50.576	Hungary; Zoltán Kammerer; Dániel Pauman; Dávid Tóth; Benjámin Ceiner	2:50.931	Germany; Kai Spenner; Lukas Reuschenbach; Kostja Stroinski; Tamás Gecső	2:53.146

=== Women's events ===
Non-Olympic classes

==== Canoe ====
Event	Gold		Silver		Bronze	
C–1 200 m	Laurence Vincent-Lapointe; Canada	45.478 WB	Olesia Romasenko; Russia	46.136	Kincső Takács; Hungary	47.178
C–2 500 m	Canada; Katie Vincent; Laurence Vincent-Lapointe	1:56.752 WB	Russia; Irina Andreeva; Olesia Romasenko	1:57.264	Belarus; Kamila Bobr; Alena Nazdrova	1:57.858

==== Kayak ====
Event	Gold		Silver		Bronze	
K–1 200 m	Lisa Carrington; New Zealand	38.433	Emma Jørgensen; Denmark	38.996	Špela Ponomarenko Janić; Slovenia; Milica Starović; Serbia	39.564
K–1 500 m	Volha Khudzenka; Belarus	1:48.421	Lisa Carrington; New Zealand	1:48.710	Emma Jørgensen; Denmark	1:50.465
K–1 1000 m	Alyce Burnett; Australia	3:55.971	Karin Johansson; Sweden	3:58.181	Rachel Cawthorn; Great Britain	3:59.036
K–1 5000 m	Dóra Bodonyi; Hungary	23:17.862	Tabea Medert; Germany	23:19.214	Lani Belcher; Great Britain	23:28.236
K–2 200 m	Hungary; Réka Hagymási; Ágnes Szabó	37.445	Italy; Susanna Cicali; Francesca Genzo	37.508	Great Britain; Angela Hannah; Hannah Brown	37.993
K–2 500 m	New Zealand; Caitlin Ryan; Lisa Carrington	1:38.687	Germany; Tina Dietze; Franziska Weber	1:40.582	Slovenia; Špela Ponomarenko Janić; Anja Ostermann	1:40.804
K–2 1000 m	Hungary; Erika Medveczky; Ramóna Farkasdi	3:37.149	Germany; Tabea Medert; Melanie Gebhardt	3:42.061	Poland; Paulina Paszek; Justyna Iskrzycka	3:42.838
K–4 500 m	Hungary; Tamara Takács; Erika Medveczky; Krisztina Fazekas-Zur; Ninetta Vad	1:29.784	Germany; Tina Dietze; Franziska Weber; Steffi Kriegerstein; Sabrina Hering	1:30.084	New Zealand; Aimee Fisher; Caitlin Ryan; Kayla Imrie; Lisa Carrington	1:30.215

== Paracanoe ==
=== Medal table ===
Rank	Nation	Gold	Silver	Bronze	Total
1	Australia	4	0	0	4
2	Great Britain	3	1	2	6
3	Ukraine	1	0	2	3
4	Italy	1	0	0	1
5	Brazil	0	2	1	3
5	Russia	0	2	1	3
7	Austria	0	2	0	2
8	Hungary	0	1	0	1
8	Uzbekistan	0	1	0	1
10	Chile	0	0	1	1
10	Romania	0	0	1	1
10	Spain	0	0	1	1
Totals (12 entries)		9	9	9	27

=== Medal events ===
Non-Paralympic classes

Event	Gold		Silver		Bronze	
Men's KL1	Esteban Farias; Italy	47.116	Róbert Suba; Hungary	47.438	Luis Carlos Cardoso da Silva; Brazil	48.016
Men's KL2	Curtis McGrath; Australia	41.758	Markus Swoboda; Austria	42.508	Mykola Syniuk; Ukraine	43.281
Men's KL3	Serhii Yemelianov; Ukraine	39.632	Caio Ribeiro de Carvalho; Brazil	39.821	Jonathan Young; Great Britain	40.104
Men's VL1 (Note: Not included in the medal table due to lack of participation)	Luis Carlos Cardoso da Silva; Brazil	55.356	Róbert Suba; Hungary	58.617	Pavel Gromov; Russia	59.689
Men's VL2	Curtis McGrath; Australia	50.628	Markus Swoboda; Austria	52.312	Javier Reja; Spain	55.017
Men's VL3	Jonathan Young; Great Britain	48.768	Caio Ribeiro de Carvalho; Brazil	49.330	Martin Tweedie; Great Britain	50.958
Women's KL1	Jeanette Chippington; Great Britain	57.383	Alexandra Dupik; Russia	57.871	Katherine Wollermann; Chile	58.665
Women's KL2	Emma Wiggs; Great Britain	49.947	Nicola Paterson; Great Britain	51.919	Nadezda Andreeva; Russia	52.514
Women's KL3	Amanda Reynolds; Australia	50.344	Shakhnoza Mirzaeva; Uzbekistan	51.778	Mihaela Luleå; Romania	52.033
Women's VL1	Jocelyn Neumueller; Australia	1:12.335	Akiko Nakajima; Japan	1:17.251	Monika Seryu; Japan	1:36.668
Women's VL2	Susan Seipel; Australia	1:02.897	Mariia Nikiforova; Russia	1:03.680	Nataliia Lagutenko; Ukraine	1:03.808
Women's VL3	Larisa Volik; Russia	59.341	Anja Adler; Germany	1:08.241	Lindsay Thorpe; Great Britain	1:08.347
