= Cayetano García =

Spanish canoeist

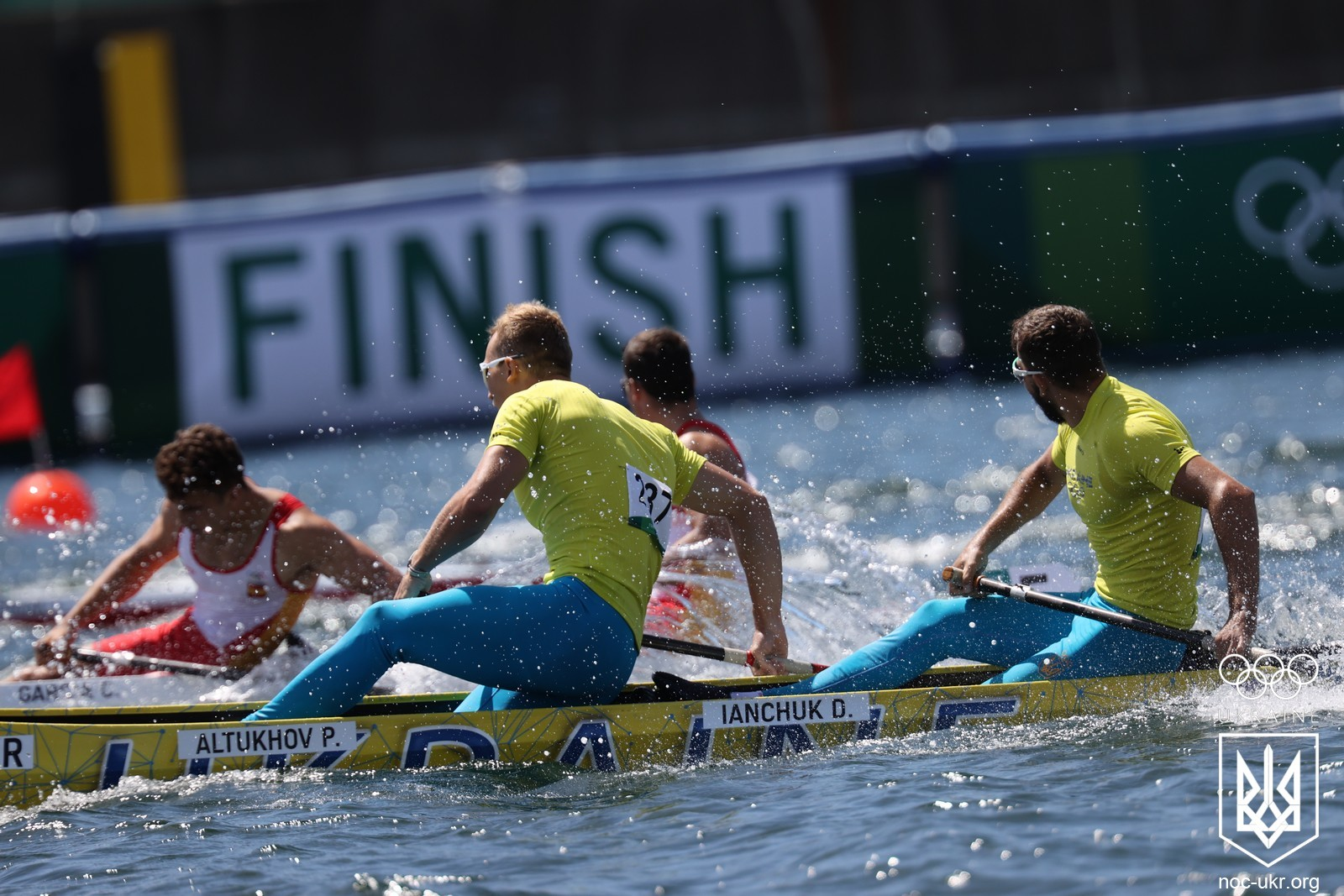

Personal information
- Full name: Cayetano Ignacio García de la Borbolla Yaque
- Born: 31 July 2001 (age 25) Seville, Spain
- Height: 1.77 m (5 ft 10 in)

Sport
- Country: Spain
- Sport: Canoe sprint
Medal record
World Championships
Gold medal – first place	2022 Dartmouth	C-2 500 m
Bronze medal – third place	2023 Duisburg	C-2 500 m
Bronze medal – third place	2026 Poznań	C-4 500 m
European Games
Silver medal – second place	2023 Kraków-Małopolska	C-2 500 m

Cayetano Ignacio García de la Borbolla Yaque (Note: In this Spanish name, the first or paternal surname is García.) (born 31 July 2001) is a Spanish canoeist. He competed in the men's C-2 1000 metres event at the 2020 Summer Olympics.
