= Serguey Torres =

Cuban canoeist (born 1987)

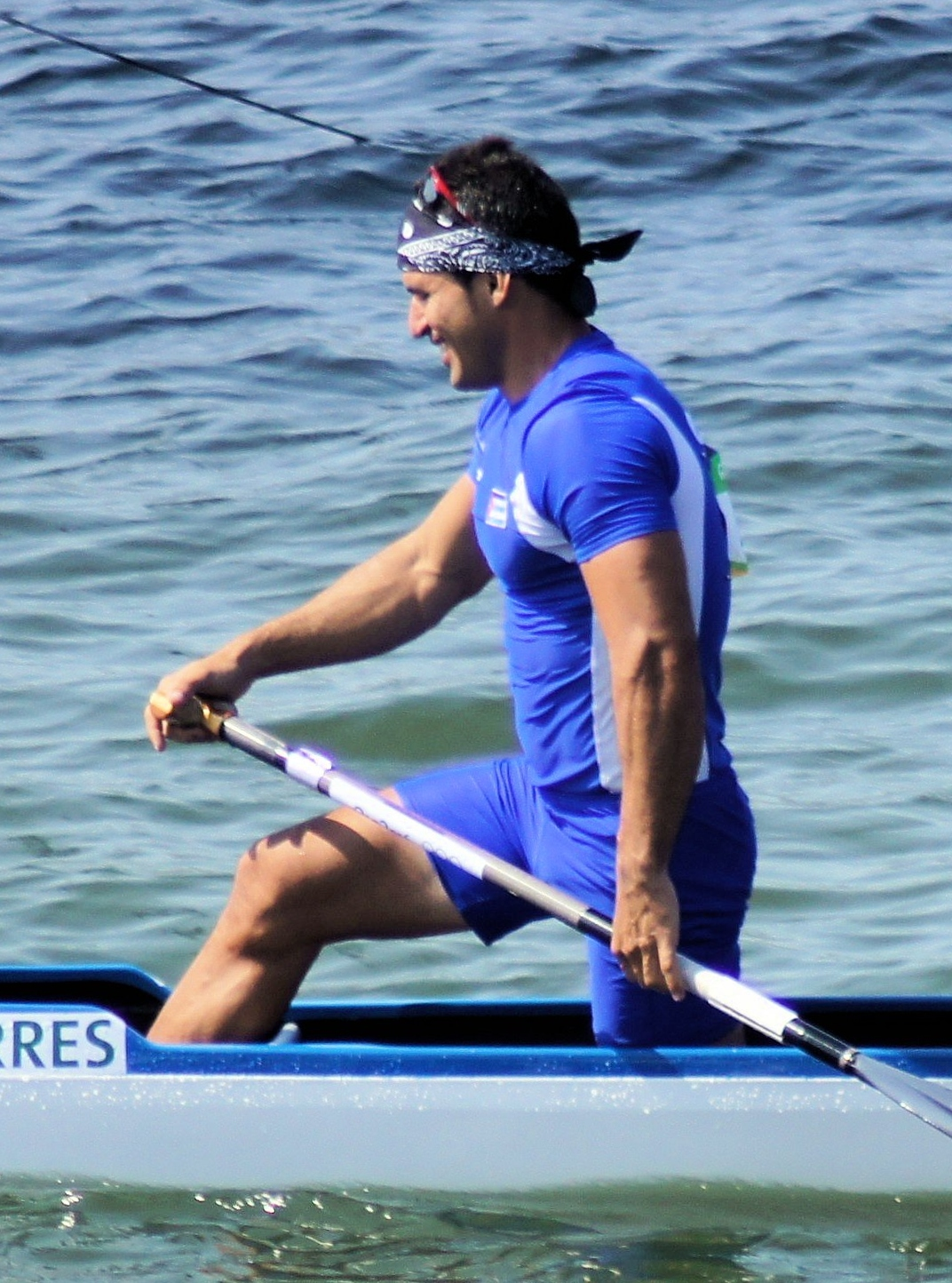
- Torres at the 2016 Summer Olympics

Personal information
- Full name: Serguey Torres Madrigal
- Born: 20 January 1987 (age 39) Sancti Spíritus, Cuba
- Height: 175 cm (5 ft 9 in)
- Weight: 74 kg (163 lb)

Sport
- Country: Cuba
- Sport: Canoe sprint
- Coached by: Yosniel Dominguez
Medal record
Men's canoe sprint
Representing Cuba
Olympic Games
Gold medal – first place	2020 Tokyo	C-2 1000 m
World Championships
Silver medal – second place	2005 Zagreb	C-2 1000 m
Silver medal – second place	2007 Duisburg	C-2 1000 m
Silver medal – second place	2017 Račice	C-1 5000 m
Silver medal – second place	2017 Račice	C-2 1000 m
Silver medal – second place	2018 Montemor-o-Velho	C-2 1000 m
Silver medal – second place	2019 Szeged	C-2 1000 m
Silver medal – second place	2022 Dartmouth	C-1 5000 m
Bronze medal – third place	2005 Zagreb	C-2 200 m
Bronze medal – third place	2005 Zagreb	C-2 500 m
Bronze medal – third place	2014 Moscow	C-2 500 m
Bronze medal – third place	2021 Copenhagen	C-2 1000 m
Pan American Games
Gold medal – first place	2007 Rio de Janeiro	C-2 500 m
Gold medal – first place	2007 Rio de Janeiro	C-2 1000 m
Gold medal – first place	2011 Guadalajara	C-2 1000 m
Gold medal – first place	2019 Lima	C-2 1000 m
Bronze medal – third place	2015 Toronto	C-2 1000 m
Central American and Caribbean Games
Gold medal – first place	2006 Cartagena	C-2 500 m
Gold medal – first place	2006 Cartagena	C-2 1000 m
Gold medal – first place	2014 Veracruz	C-1 1000 m
Gold medal – first place	2014 Veracruz	C-2 1000 m
Gold medal – first place	2018 Barranquilla	C-2 1000 m
Silver medal – second place	2006 Cartagena	C-1 1000 m

Serguey Torres Madrigal (born 20 January 1987) is a Cuban sprint canoeist who mostly competes in flatwater canoe doubles (C-2). He won four medals at the ICF Canoe Sprint World Championships, including two silvers (C-2 1000 m: 2005 and 2007) and two bronzes (C-2 200 m and C-2 500 m, both in 2007). He competed in the Tokyo 2020 Olympic Games and won a gold medal in the Men's C-2 1000 metres event. He placed ninth, sixth and sixth in the C-2 1000 m event at the 2008, 2012, and 2016 Olympics, respectively.

== Personal life ==
Torres has a degree in physical education from the Superior Institute of Physical Culture Manuel Fajardo in Havana. He is married and has one daughter.
