= Norman Zezula =

Polish sprint canoeist

Personal information
- Nationality: Polish
- Born: 8 June 1999 (age 27)

Sport
- Country: Poland
- Sport: Canoe sprint
Medal record
Men's canoe sprint
Representing Poland
World Championships
Silver medal – second place	2021 Copenhagen	C-4 500 m
Silver medal – second place	2022 Dartmouth	C-4 500 m
Silver medal – second place	2023 Duisburg	C-4 500 m
European Games
Bronze medal – third place	2023 Kraków–Małopolska	C-2 500 m

Norman Zezula (born 8 June 1999) is a Polish sprint canoeist.

He competed at the 2021 ICF Canoe Sprint World Championships, winning a silver medal in the C-4 500 m distance.
