= Petr Fuksa Jr. =

Czech canoeist (born 1998)

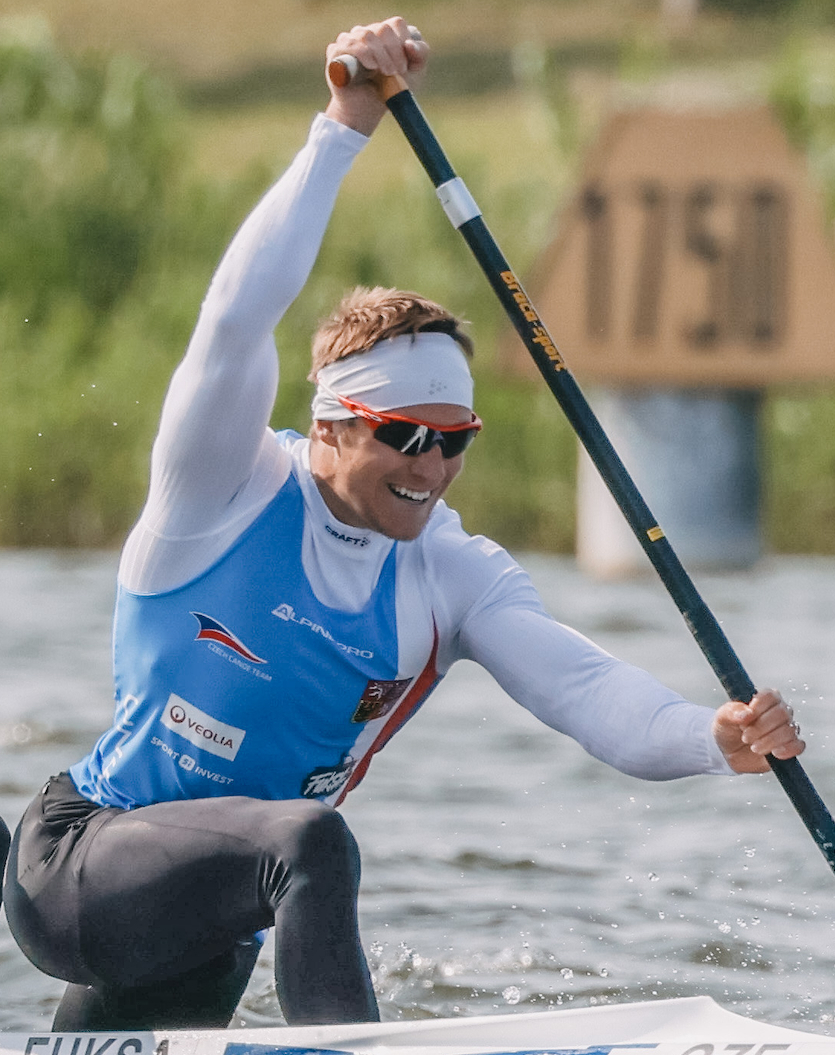
- Fuska in 2023

Personal information
- Nationality: Czech
- Born: 9 August 1998 (age 28) Nymburk, Czech Republic
- Height: 1.81 m (5 ft 11 in)

Sport
- Country: Czech Republic
- Sport: Canoe sprint
- Club: ASC Dukla Praha
- Coached by: Petr Fuksa; Josef Fuksa

Petr Fuksa Jr. (born 9 August 1998) is a Czech canoeist. He competed in the men's C-1 1000 metres and men's C-2 1000 metres events at 2020 Summer Olympics.

== Career ==
Fuksa and his brother Martin first began competing together as C-2 canoeists in 2017 at the Canoe Sprint World Cup. Fuksa and his brother represented the Czech Republic at the 2019 European Games in the men's C-2 1000 metres event and finished in sixth place with a time of 3:46.072.

Fuksa represented the Czech Republic at the 2020 Summer Olympics in the men's C-2 1000 metres event with his brother Martin, and in the men's C-1 1000 metres event.

== Personal life ==
Fuksa is the son of former canoeist Petr Fuksa and the brother of Martin Fuksa.
