= Roland Varga (canoeist) =

Canadian sprint kayaker (born 1990)

Personal information
- Nationality: Canadian
- Born: August 6, 1990 (age 35) Budapest, Hungary
- Home town: Aurora, Ontario, Canada

Sport
- Country: Canada
- Sport: Canoeing

Roland Varga (born August 6, 1990) is a Canadian canoeist. Varga immigrated with his family to Canada when he was 15. Varga currently resides in Aurora, Ontario.

== Career ==
Varga has competed as part of the national team since 2009. His first multi-sport games was the 2011 Pan American Games in Guadalajara where he was disqualified in the C-1 1000 event. In 2012 along with partner, Paul Bryant, competed on the World Cup Circuit, with their top placing being a C-2 500m silver in 2013. Also in 2013, Varga competed in both the U23 and senior ICF World Championships. At the former, he finished fourth in the C-2 1000m with Marc Tarling. At the latter, Varga and Bryant won the B final in the C-2 500m.

In 2014, Varga raced with Gabriel Beauchesne-Sévigny during the World Cup calendar, and made the A Final in three of four races. In 2015, Varga had a decided to stop paddling, after he had a disappointing national trials. However, seven months later Varga decided to come back after his hiatus.

In 2016, Varga continued on the World Cup team and with Bryant advanced to A finals in all three races, finishing as high as fourth place. In 2018, Varga formed a C-2 boat with Connor Fitzpatrick. They won the C-2 1000m B final in their first World Cup event in Szeged, Hungary and the following week they advanced to the A final. At the World Championships, they placed sixth in the B final of the C-2 1000m.

In 2019, Varga and Fitzpatrick broke the National record at the 2019 World Championships in the C-2 1000m to 3:28.742 in semifinals before finishing second in the B final (11th overall). In May 2021, Varga along with Fitzpatrick were named to their first Olympic team in the C-2 1000 event.
