= Tim Hecker (canoeist) =

German canoeist (born 1997)

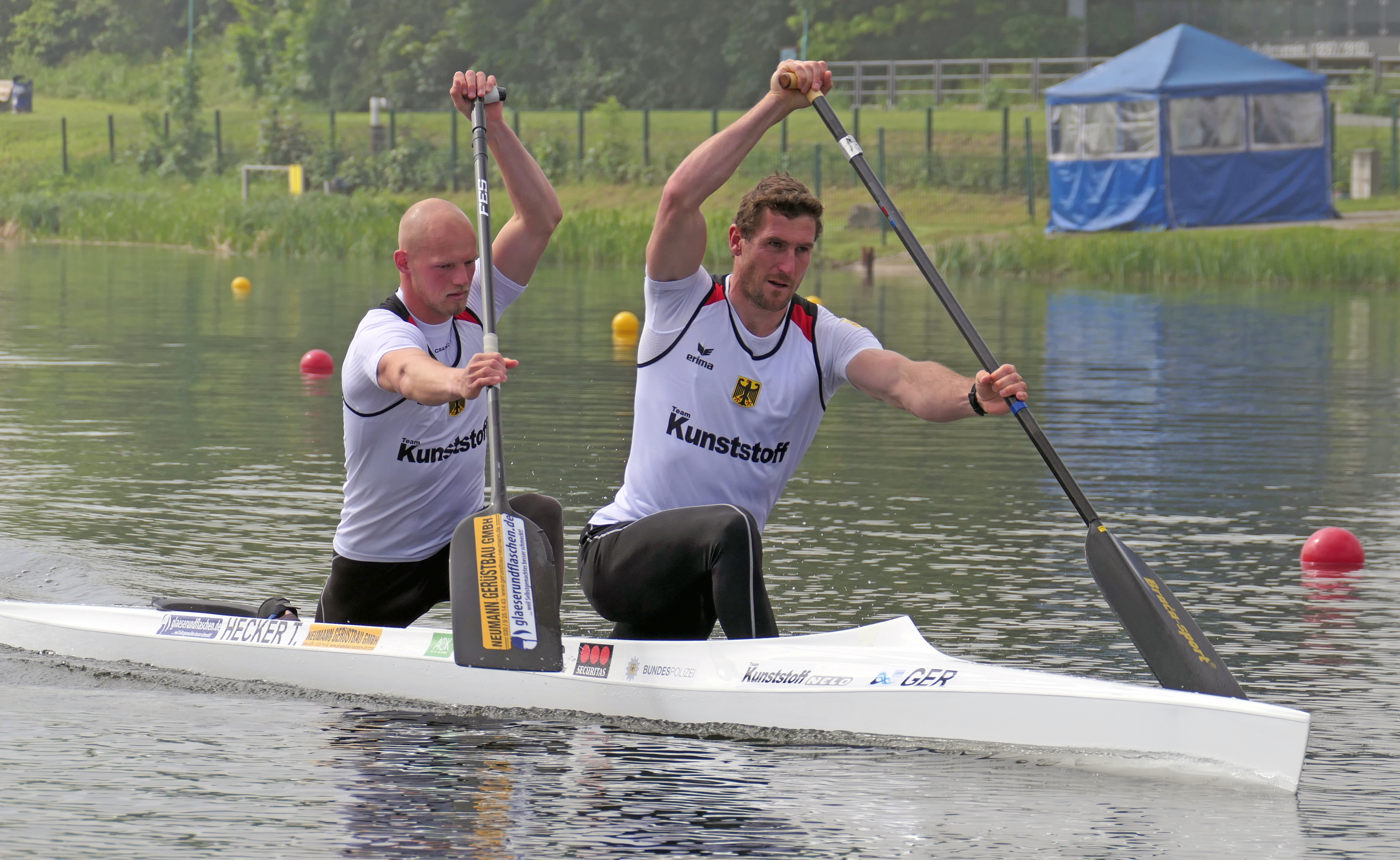
- Sebastian Brendel and Tim Hecker

Personal information
- Nationality: German
- Born: 28 September 1997 (age 28) Berlin, Germany
- Height: 1.90 m (6 ft 3 in)
- Weight: 86 kg (190 lb)

Sport
- Country: Germany
- Sport: Sprint canoe
- Event: C-4 500 m
- Club: Sportclub Berlin-Grünau
Medal record
Men's canoe sprint
Representing Germany
Olympic Games
| Bronze medal – third place | 2020 Tokyo | C-2 1000 m |
World Championships
| Gold medal – first place | 2022 Dartmouth | C-2 1000 m |
| Gold medal – first place | 2023 Duisburg | C-2 500 m |
| Silver medal – second place | 2019 Szeged | C-4 500 m |
European Championships
| Gold medal – first place | 2021 Poznań | C-2 1000 m |
| Gold medal – first place | 2022 Munich | C-2 1000 m |
| Silver medal – second place | 2021 Poznań | C-2 500 m |
| Silver medal – second place | 2026 Montemor-o-Velho | C-4 Mix 500 m |
| Bronze medal – third place | 2022 Munich | C-2 500 m |

Tim Hecker (born 28 September 1997) is a German sprint canoeist.

== Career ==
He won a medal at the 2019 ICF Canoe Sprint World Championships. He represented Germany in the Tokyo 2020 Olympic Games and won a bronze medal in the Men's C-2 1000 metres event.
