= Ádám Fekete (canoeist) =

Hungarian canoeist

Personal information
- Nationality: Hungarian
- Born: 16 May 1994 (age 32) Budapest, Hungary

Sport
- Country: Hungary
- Sport: Canoe sprint
- Event(s): C–2 200 m, C–2 500 m
Medal record
Men's canoe sprint
Representing Hungary
World Championships
Silver medal – second place	2019 Szeged	C-2 500 m
Silver medal – second place	2021 Copenhagen	C-2 500 m
Bronze medal – third place	2017 Račice	C-2 200 m
European Championships
Bronze medal – third place	2017 Plovdiv	C-2 200 m

Ádám Fekete (born 16 May 1994) is a Hungarian sprint canoeist.

He won a medal at the 2019 ICF Canoe Sprint World Championships.
