= Ji Bowen =

Chinese canoeist

Personal information
- Born: 22 February 2002 (age 24) Zhejiang, China
- Height: 1.80 m (5 ft 11 in)

Sport
- Country: China
- Sport: Sprint canoe
Medal record
Men's canoe sprint
Representing China
Olympic Games
Gold medal – first place	2024 Paris	C-2 500 m
World Championships
Bronze medal – third place	2026 Poznań	C-1 500 m
Asian Games
Gold medal – first place	2026 Aichi–Nagoya	C-1 500 m
Gold medal – first place	2026 Aichi–Nagoya	C-2 500 m

Ji Bowen (Chinese: 季博文; pinyin: Jì Bówén; born 22 February 2002) is a Chinese sprint canoeist. He won gold at the 2024 Summer Olympics in the C-2 500m event.
