= Vadim Korobov =

Lithuanian canoeist (born 1997)

Personal information
- Nationality: Lithuanian
- Born: 6 April 1997 (age 29)

Sport
- Country: Lithuania
- Sport: Sprint canoe
- Event: C-2 200 m
Medal record
Representing Lithuania
Men's sprint canoeing
European Championships
Silver medal – second place	2022 Munich	C-2 200 m
Bronze medal – third place	2021 Poznań	C-2 200 m
Youth Olympic Games
Silver medal – second place	2014 Nanjing	Sprint C1
Men's standup paddleboarding
World Championships
Silver medal – second place	2025 Abu Dhabi	Sprint

Vadim Korobov (born 6 April 1997) is a Lithuanian sprint canoeist.

In 2021 and 2022 Korobov won bronze and silver medals respectively at the Canoe Sprint European Championships in Men's C2-200 m event.
