= Vitaliy Vergeles =

Ukrainian canoeist

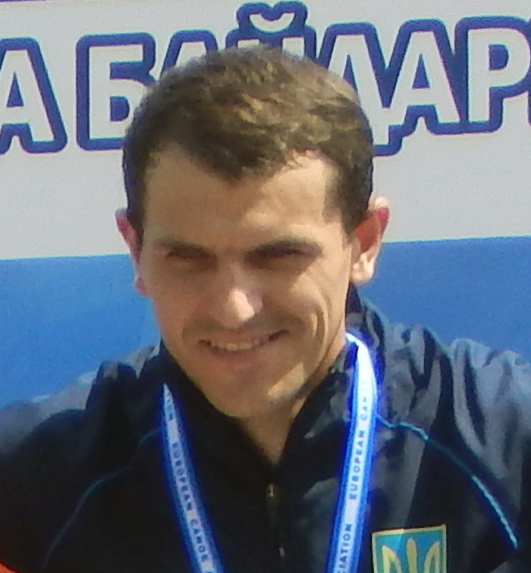

Personal information
- Nationality: Ukrainian
- Born: 15 November 1989 (age 36) Lviv, Ukraine

Sport
- Country: Ukraine
- Sport: Canoe sprint
Medal record
Men's canoe sprint
Representing Ukraine
World Championships
Gold medal – first place	2021 Copenhagen	C-4 500 m
Silver medal – second place	2015 Milan	C-4 1000 m
Bronze medal – third place	2017 Račice	C-4 1000 m
Bronze medal – third place	2022 Dartmouth	C-4 500 m
Bronze medal – third place	2023 Duisburg	C-4 500 m
European Championships
Silver medal – second place	2016 Moscow	C-4 1000 m
Bronze medal – third place	2012 Zagreb	C-2 500 m
Bronze medal – third place	2013 Montemor-o-Velho	C-4 1000 m
Bronze medal – third place	2016 Moscow	C-2 500 m
Bronze medal – third place	2021 Poznań	C-2 500 m
Universiade
Gold medal – first place	2013 Kazan	C-4 1000 m
Silver medal – second place	2013 Kazan	C-4 500 m

Vitaliy Vergeles (born 15 November 1989) is a Ukrainian sprint canoeist. He is World champion and multiple World Championships medalist. He is also a multiple medalist of the European Championships.
