= List of canoeists at the 2020 Summer Olympics =

The following is a list of canoeists who will compete at the 2020 Summer Olympics in Tokyo, Japan. Canoeists will compete in 4 slalom and 12 sprint events.

== Canoe Slalom ==
This table lists the athletes competing in canoe slalom events at the 2020 Olympics, along with their ICF World Ranking going into the event. Eight female athletes competing in both the K1W and C1W disciplines provide additional places in each event, increasing the total athletes to 27 and 22, respectively.

Class:	K1 Men	K1 Women	C1 Men	C1 Women
Athletes	Jiří Prskavec (CZE) (1); Hannes Aigner (GER) (3); Peter Kauzer (SLO) (4); Lucien Delfour (AUS) (5); Giovanni De Gennaro (ITA) (7); Boris Neveu (FRA) (8); Martin Dougoud (SUI) (12); Jakub Grigar (SVK) (14); Bradley Forbes-Cryans (GBR) (16); David Llorente (ESP) (17); Antoine Launay (POR) (19); Michal Smolen (USA) (23); Pavel Eigel (ROC) (27); Felix Oschmautz (AUT) (28); Pepe Gonçalves (BRA) (39); Callum Gilbert (NZL) (41); Krzysztof Majerczak (POL) (51); Kazuya Adachi (JPN) (59); Erik Holmer (SWE) (66); Quan Xin (CHN) (78); Michael Tayler (CAN) (81); Mathis Soudi (MAR) (97); Lucas Rossi (ARG) (112); Gabriel De Coster (BEL) (123)	Jessica Fox (AUS) (1); Ricarda Funk (GER) (3); Eva Terčelj (SLO) (4); Stefanie Horn (ITA) (6); Maialen Chourraut (ESP) (7); Luuka Jones (NZL) (8); Kateřina Kudějová (CZE) (10); Ana Sátila (BRA) (12); Viktoria Wolffhardt (AUT) (13); Kimberley Woods (GBR) (16); Marie-Zélia Lafont (FRA) (18); Viktoriia Us (UKR) (19); Klaudia Zwolińska (POL) (20); Eliška Mintálová (SVK) (23); Martina Wegman (NED) (28); Evy Leibfarth (USA) (29); Aki Yazawa (JPN) (41); Monica Doria Vilarrubla (AND) (42); Li Tong (CHN) (47); Florence Maheu (CAN) (60); Alsu Minazova (ROC) (65); Jane Nicholas (COK) (81); Naemi Brändle (SUI) (97); Chang Chu-Han (TPE) (188); Sofia Reinoso (MEX) (161); Célia Jodar (MAR) (216); Yekaterina Smirnova (KAZ) (450)	Sideris Tasiadis (GER) (1); Matej Beňuš (SVK) (4); Benjamin Savšek (SLO) (7); Adam Burgess (GBR) (11); Martin Thomas (FRA) (14); Grzegorz Hedwig (POL) (15); Ander Elosegi (ESP) (18); Lukáš Rohan (CZE) (21); Thomas Koechlin (SUI) (24); Matija Marinić (CRO) (35); Liam Jegou (IRL) (38); Daniel Watkins (AUS) (39); Takuya Haneda (JPN) (44); Zachary Lokken (USA) (50); Cameron Smedley (CAN) (51); Jean-Pierre Bourhis (SEN) (54); Alexandr Kulikov (KAZ) (85); Pavel Eigel (ROC) (NRk)	Jessica Fox (AUS) (1); Mallory Franklin (GBR) (2); Ana Sátila (BRA) (3); Andrea Herzog (GER) (4); Nadine Weratschnig (AUT) (5); Tereza Fišerová (CZE) (6); Núria Vilarrubla (ESP) (9); Monica Doria Vilarrubla (AND) (10); Evy Leibfarth (USA) (15); Luuka Jones (NZL) (17); Alsu Minazova (ROC) (19); Monika Škáchová (SVK) (27); Chen Shi (CHN) (29); Marjorie Delassus (FRA) (31); Alja Kozorog (SLO) (32); Viktoriia Us (UKR) (35); Aleksandra Stach (POL) (39); Marta Bertoncelli (ITA) (41); Haley Daniels (CAN) (66); Alena Marx (SUI) (75); Ayano Sato (JPN) (88); Jane Nicholas (COK) (94)
Total	24	27	18	22

== Canoe Sprint ==
=== Male ===
This table lists the male athletes competing in individual canoe sprint events at the 2020 Olympics, in alphabetical order by nation.

Class:	K1 Men 200m	K1 Men 1000m	C1 Men 1000m
Athletes	Rubén Rézola (ARG); Amado Cruz (BIZ); Mark de Jonge (CAN); Nicholas Matveev (CAN); Yang Xiaoxu (CHN); Kohl Horton (COK); Momen Mahran (EGY); Maxime Beaumont (FRA); Max Lemke (GER); Ronald Rauhe (GER); Liam Heath (GBR); Kolos Csizmadia (HUN); Sandor Totka (HUN); Manfredi Rizza (ITA); Momotaro Matsushita (JPN); Roberts Akmens (LAT); Mindaugas Maldonis (LTU); Cho Gwang-hee (KOR); Oleg Gusev (ROC); Evgenii Lukantsov (ROC); Tuva'a Clifton (SAM); Rudolph Berking-Williams (SAM); Strahinja Stefanović (SRB); Bojan Zdelar (SRB); Carlos Arévalo (ESP); Saúl Craviotto (ESP); Petter Menning (SWE)	Agustín Vernice (ARG); Thomas Green (AUS); Jean van der Westhuyzen (AUS); Aleh Yurenia (BLR); Artuur Peters (BEL); Amado Cruz (BIZ); Vagner Souta (BRA); Simon McTavish (CAN); Zhang Dong (CHN); Kohl Horton (COK); Josef Dostál (CZE); Guillaume Burger (FRA); Étienne Hubert (FRA); Max Hoff (GER); Jacob Schopf (GER); Bálint Kopasz (HUN); Ádám Varga (HUN); Ali Aghamirzaeijenaghrad (IRN); Samuele Burgo (ITA); Lars Magne Ullvang (NOR); Fernando Pimenta (POR); Saeid Fazloula (EOR); Roman Anoshkin (ROC); Maxim Spesivtsev (ROC); Tuva'a Clifton (SAM); Bojan Zdelar (SRB); Peter Gelle (SVK); Mohamed Mrabet (TUN)	Jacky Godmann (BRA); Isaquias Queiroz (BRA); Connor Fitzpatrick (CAN); Roland Varga (CAN); Yang Xiaoxu (CHN); Zheng Pengfei (CHN); Fernando Jorge (CUB); Jose Cordova (CUB); Martin Fuksa (CZE); Petr Fuksa (CZE); Adrien Bart (FRA); Sebastian Brendel (GER); Conrad Scheibner (GER); Balázs Adolf (HUN); Dániel Fejes (HUN); Takanori Tōme (JPN); Sergey Yemelyanov (KAZ); Serghei Tarnovschi (MDA); Joaquim Lobo (MOZ); Wiktor Głazunow (POL); Mateusz Kaminski (POL); Vladislav Chebotar (ROC); Viktor Melantev (ROC); Cătălin Chirilă (ROU); Victor Mihalachi (ROU); Buly Triste (STP); Roque Dos Ramos (STP); Rudolph Berking-Williams (SAM); Cayetano Garcia (ESP); Pablo Martinez (ESP); Ghailene Khattali (TUN); Pavlo Altukhov (UKR); Yurii Vandiuk (UKR)
Total	27	28	33

This table lists the male athletes competing in team boats at the 2020 Olympics, in alphabetical order by nation.

Class:	K2 Men 1000m	K4 Men 500m	C2 Men 1000m
Athletes	Riley Fitzsimmons & Jordan Wood (AUS); Vincent Jourdenais & Brian Malfesi (CAN); Josef Dostál & Radek Šlouf (CZE); Guillaume Burger & Étienne Hubert (FRA); Max Hoff & Jacob Schopf (GER); Kornél Béke & Ádám Varga (HUN); Luca Beccaro & Samuele Burgo (ITA); Max Brown & Kurtis Imrie (NZL); Francisco Cubelos & Íñigo Peña (ESP); Samuel Baláž & Adam Botek (SVK); TBC (CHN)	Murray Stewart, Lachlan Tame, Jean van der Westhuyzen & Jordan Wood (AUS); Stanislau Daineka, Uladzislau Litvinau, Aliaksei Misiuchenka & Dzmitry Natynchyk (BLR); Mark de Jonge, Nicholas Matveev, Simon McTavish & Pierre-Luc Poulin (CAN); Max Lemke, Tom Liebscher, Ronald Rauhe & Max Rendschmidt (GER); Kolos Csizmadia, Bálint Kopasz, Bence Nádas & Sandor Totka (HUN); Hiroki Fujishima, Yūsuke Miyata, Momotaro Matsushita & Keiji Mizumoto (JPN); Carlos Arévalo, Saúl Craviotto, Rodrigo Germade & Marcus Walz (ESP); Messias Baptista, João Ribeiro, Emanuel Silva & David Varela (POR); Erik Vlček, Denis Myšák, Samuel Baláž & Adam Botek (SVK); TBC (ROC)	Isaquias Queiroz & Jacky Godmann (BRA); Connor Fitzpatrick & Roland Varga (CAN); Serguey Torres & Fernando Jorge (CUB); Martin Fuksa & Petr Fuksa (CZE); Sebastian Brendel & Tim Hecker (GER); Balázs Adolf & Dániel Fejes (HUN); Sergey Yemelyanov & Timofey Yemelyanov (KAZ); Tomasz Barniak & Wiktor Głazunow (POL); Cătălin Chirilă & Victor Mihalachi (ROM); Buly Triste & Roque Dos Ramos (STP); Cayetano Garcia & Pablo Martinez (ESP); TBC (CHN); TBC (ROC); TBC (UKR)
Total	22	40	33

=== Female ===
This table lists the female athletes competing in individual canoe sprint events at the 2020 Olympics, in alphabetical order by nation.

Class:	K1 Women 200m	K1 Women 500m	C1 Women 200m
Athletes	Amira Kheris (ALG); Brenda Rojas (ARG); Andréanne Langlois (CAN); Michelle Russell (CAN); Ma Qing (CHN); Yin Mengdie (CHN); Jade Tierney (COK); Anamaria Govorčinović (CRO); Emma Jørgensen (DEN); Sara Milthers (DEN); Léa Jamelot (FRA); Vanina Paoletti (FRA); Jule Hake (GER); Emily Lewis (GBR); Deborah Kerr (GBR); Anna Kárász (HUN); Dóra Lucz (HUN); Francesca Genzo (ITA); Yuka Ono (JPN); Natalya Sergeyeva (KAZ); Lisa Carrington (NZL); Marta Walczykiewicz (POL); Helena Wiśniewska (POL); Teresa Portela (POR); Joana Vasconcelos (POR); Varvara Baranova (ROC); Natalia Podolskaya (ROC); Anne Cairns (SAM); Milica Novaković (SRB); Teresa Portela (ESP); Linnea Stensils (SWE); Khaoula Sassi (TUN); Mariia Kichasova-Skoryk (UKR); Yuliia Yuriichuk (UKR)	Amira Kheris (ALG); Brenda Rojas (ARG); Alyssa Bull (AUS); Alyce Wood (AUS); Viktoria Schwarz (AUT); Ana Roxana Lehaci (AUT); Volha Khudzenka (BLR); Maryna Litvinchuk (BLR); Lize Broekx (BEL); Hermien Peters (BEL); Michelle Russell (CAN); Laurence Vincent-Lapointe (CAN); Huang Jieyi (CHN); Yin Mengdie (CHN); Anamaria Govorčinović (CRO); Emma Jørgensen (DEN); Samaa Ahmed (EGY); Manon Hostens (FRA); Jule Hake (GER); Sabrina Hering-Pradler (GER); Deborah Kerr (GBR); Emily Lewis (GBR); Tamara Csipes (HUN); Danuta Kozák (HUN); Francesca Genzo (ITA); Natalya Sergeyeva (KAZ); Lisa Carrington (NZL); Caitlin Regal (NZL); Justyna Iskrzycka (POL); Marta Walczykiewicz (POL); Teresa Portela (POR); Joana Vasconcelos (POR); Svetlana Chernigovskaya (ROC); Kira Stepanova (ROC); Anne Cairns (SAM); Milica Novaković (SRB); Anja Osterman (SLO); Spela Ponomarenko Janic (SLO); Isabel Contreras (ESP); Linnea Stensils (SWE); Mariya Povkh (UKR); Yuliia Yuriichuk (UKR)	Josephine Bulmer (AUS); Bernadette Wallace (AUS); Alena Nazdrova (BLR); Staniliya Stamenova (BUL); Laurence Vincent-Lapointe (CAN); Katie Vincent (CAN); María Mailliard (CHI); Vanesa Tot (CRO); Yarisleidis Cirilo Duboys (CUB); Katherin Nuevo Segura (CUB); Lisa Jahn (GER); Sophie Koch (GER); Katie Reid (GBR); Dóra Horányi (HUN); Kincső Takács (HUN); Teruko Kiriake (JPN); Manaka Kubota (JPN); Margarita Torlopova (KAZ); Ayomide Emmanuel Bello (NGR); Dorota Borowska (POL); Daniela Cociu (MDA); Maria Olărașu (MDA); Irina Andreeva (ROC); Olesia Romasenko (ROC); Antía Jácome (ESP); Orasa Thiangkathok (THA); Anastasiia Chetverikova (UKR); Liudmyla Luzan (UKR); Nevin Harrison (USA); Dilnoza Rakhmatova (UZB); Nilufar Zokirova (UZB)
Total	34	42	31

This table lists the female athletes competing in team boats at the 2020 Olympics, in alphabetical order by nation.

Class:	K2 Women 500m	K4 Women 500m	C2 Women 500m
Athletes	Catherine McArthur & Shannon Reynolds (AUS); Viktoria Schwarz & Ana Roxana Lehaci (AUT); Volha Khudzenka & Maryna Litvinchuk (BLR); Lize Broekx & Hermien Peters (BEL); Lissa Bissonette & Courtney Stott (CAN); Sarah Brüßler & Melanie Gebhardt (GER); Tamara Csipes & Erika Medveczky (HUN); Lisa Carrington & Caitlin Regal (NZL); Teneale Hatton & Alicia Hoskin (NZL); Karolina Naja & Anna Puławska (POL); Anja Osterman & Spela Ponomarenko Janic (SLO); Afef Ben Ismail & Khaoula Sassi (TUN); TBC (CHN); TBC (UKR)	Alyssa Bull, Jo Brigden-Jones, Alyce Burnett & Jaime Roberts (AUS); Volha Khudzenka, Nadzeya Liapeshka, Maryna Litvinchuk & Marharyta Makhneva (BLR); Alanna Bray-Lougheed, Andréanne Langlois, Michelle Russell & Madeline Schmidt (CAN); Emma Jørgensen, Julie Frølund Funch, Bolette Nyvang Iversen & Sara Milthers (DEN); Sarah Guyot, Manon Hostens, Lea Jamelot & Vanina Paoletti (FRA); Caroline Arft, Tina Dietze, Jule Hake & Sabrina Hering (GER); Dóra Bodonyi, Tamara Csipes, Anna Kárász & Danuta Kozák (HUN); Lisa Carrington, Teneale Hatton, Alicia Hoskin & Caitlin Regal (NZL); Karolina Naja, Anna Puławska, Katarzyna Kołodziejczyk & Helena Wisniewska (POL); TBC (CHN); TBC (ROC); TBC (UKR)	Josephine Bulmer & Bernadette Wallace (AUS); Volha Klimava & Nadzeya Makarchanka (BLR); Laurence Vincent-Lapointe & Katie Vincent (CAN); María Mailliard & Karen Roco (CHI); Yarisleidis Cirilo Duboys & Katherin Nuevo Segura (CUB); Lisa Jahn & Sophie Koch (GER); Virág Balla & Kincső Takács (HUN); Teruko Kiriake & Manaka Kubota (JPN); Svetlana Ussova & Margarita Torlopova (KAZ); Daniela Cociu & Maria Olărașu (MDA); Liudmyla Luzan & Anastasiia Chetverikova (UKR); Dilnoza Rakhmatova & Nilufar Zokirova (UZB); TBC (CHN); TBC (ROC)
Total	28	48	28
