= 2019 ICF Canoe Sprint World Championships – Women's C-2 500 metres =

Women's C-2 500 metres at the 2019 ICF Canoe Sprint World Championships
- Venue: Olympic Centre of Szeged
- Location: Szeged, Hungary
- Dates: 22–25 August
- Competitors: 48 from 24 nations
- Winning time: 2:02.81

Medalists
| gold medal | Sun Mengya; Xu Shixiao | China |
| silver medal | Kincső Takács; Virág Balla | Hungary |
| bronze medal | Volha Klimava; Nadzeya Makarchanka | Belarus |

The women's C-2 500 metres competition at the 2019 ICF Canoe Sprint World Championships in Szeged took place at the Olympic Centre of Szeged.

== Schedule ==
The schedule was as follows:

| Date | Time | Round |
|---|---|---|
| Thursday 22 August 2019 | 16:57 | Heats |
| Saturday 24 August 2019 | 15:18 | Semifinals |
| Sunday 25 August 2019 | 10:32 | Final B |
| Sunday 25 August 2019 | 11:34 | Final A |

All times are Central European Summer Time (UTC+2)

== Results ==
=== Heats ===
Heat winners advanced directly to the A final.
The next six fastest boats in each heat advanced to the semifinals.

==== Heat 1 ====
| Rank | Canoeists | Country | Time | Notes |
|---|---|---|---|---|
| 1 | Sun Mengya; Xu Shixiao | China | 1:52.36 | QA |
| 2 | Liudmyla Luzan; Anastasiia Chetverikova | Ukraine | 1:57.57 | QS |
| 3 | María Mailliard; Karen Roco | Chile | 1:59.72 | QS |
| 4 | Volha Klimava; Nadzeya Makarchanka | Belarus | 1:59.73 | QS |
| 5 | Riska Andriyani; Nurmeni | Indonesia | 2:00.26 | QS |
| 6 | Maria Olărașu; Daniela Cociu | Moldova | 2:00.79 | QS |
| 7 | Lydia Sampson; Nevin Harrison | United States | 2:00.81 | QS |
| 8 | Bernadette Wallace; Josephine Bulmer | Australia | 2:01.73 | |

==== Heat 2 ====
| Rank | Canoeists | Country | Time | Notes |
|---|---|---|---|---|
| 1 | Mayvihanet Borges; Katherin Nuevo | Cuba | 1:57.43 | QA |
| 2 | Lisa Jahn; Ophelia Preller | Germany | 1:58.32 | QS |
| 3 | Teruko Kiriake; Manaka Kubota | Japan | 1:59.92 | QS |
| 4 | Julia Walczak; Sylwia Szczerbińska | Poland | 2:02.36 | QS |
| 5 | Eugénie Dorange; Flore Caupain | France | 2:02.70 | QS |
| 6 | Oh Un-ha; O Su-rim | North Korea | 2:03.15 | QS |
| 7 | Jana Ježová; Lenka Jandová | Czech Republic | 2:04.99 | QS |
| 8 | Combe Seck; Oulimata Fall | Senegal | 2:20.35 | |

==== Heat 3 ====
| Rank | Canoeists | Country | Time | Notes |
|---|---|---|---|---|
| 1 | Kincső Takács; Virág Balla | Hungary | 1:55.41 | QA |
| 2 | Dilnoza Rakhmatova; Nilufar Zokirova | Uzbekistan | 1:57.12 | QS |
| 3 | Patricia Coco; Antía Jácome | Spain | 1:58.66 | QS |
| 4 | Daria Kharchenko; Kseniia Kurach | Russia | 1:59.96 | QS |
| 5 | Chloe Bracewell; Katie Reid | Great Britain | 2:00.42 | QS |
| 6 | Trương Thị Phượng; Nguyễn Thị Tuyết | Vietnam | 2:04.01 | QS |
| 7 | Ana Ochoa; Manuela Gómez | Colombia | 2:04.66 | QS |
| 8 | Anjali Bashishth; Anusha Prasad | India | 2:09.93 | |

=== Semifinals ===
Qualification was as follows:

The fastest three boats in each semi advanced to the A final.
The next four fastest boats in each semi, plus the fastest remaining boat advanced to the B final.

==== Semifinal 1 ====
| Rank | Canoeists | Country | Time | Notes |
|---|---|---|---|---|
| 1 | Dilnoza Rakhmatova; Nilufar Zokirova | Uzbekistan | 2:03.93 | QA |
| 2 | María Mailliard; Karen Roco | Chile | 2:04.53 | QA |
| 3 | Teruko Kiriake; Manaka Kubota | Japan | 2:05.04 | QA |
| 4 | Daria Kharchenko; Kseniia Kurach | Russia | 2:05.18 | QB |
| 5 | Maria Olărașu; Daniela Cociu | Moldova | 2:05.78 | QB |
| 6 | Julia Walczak; Sylwia Szczerbińska | Poland | 2:06.07 | QB |
| 7 | Riska Andriyani; Nurmeni | Indonesia | 2:06.40 | QB |
| 8 | Oh Un-ha; O Su-rim | North Korea | 2:09.20 | qB |
| 9 | Ana Ochoa; Manuela Gómez | Colombia | 2:14.09 | |

==== Semifinal 2 ====
| Rank | Canoeists | Country | Time | Notes |
|---|---|---|---|---|
| 1 | Volha Klimava; Nadzeya Makarchanka | Belarus | 2:03.08 | QA |
| 2 | Liudmyla Luzan; Anastasiia Chetverikova | Ukraine | 2:03.99 | QA |
| 3 | Lisa Jahn; Ophelia Preller | Germany | 2:04.02 | QA |
| 4 | Patricia Coco; Antía Jácome | Spain | 2:04.97 | QB |
| 5 | Lydia Sampson; Nevin Harrison | United States | 2:07.03 | QB |
| 6 | Eugénie Dorange; Flore Caupain | France | 2:09.31 | QB |
| 7 | Chloe Bracewell; Katie Reid | Great Britain | 2:11.25 | QB |
| 8 | Jana Ježová; Lenka Jandová | Czech Republic | 2:12.31 | |
| 9 | Trương Thị Phượng; Nguyễn Thị Tuyết | Vietnam | 2:20.49 | |

=== Finals ===
==== Final B ====
Competitors in this final raced for positions 10 to 18.

| Rank | Canoeists | Country | Time |
|---|---|---|---|
| 1 | Patricia Coco; Antía Jácome | Spain | 2:08.19 |
| 2 | Chloe Bracewell; Katie Reid | Great Britain | 2:08.63 |
| 3 | Julia Walczak; Sylwia Szczerbińska | Poland | 2:09.64 |
| 4 | Maria Olărașu; Daniela Cociu | Moldova | 2:09.87 |
| 5 | Riska Andriyani; Nurmeni | Indonesia | 2:11.00 |
| 6 | Eugénie Dorange; Flore Caupain | France | 2:11.10 |
| 7 | Oh Un-ha; O Su-rim | North Korea | 2:12.06 |
| 8 | Daria Kharchenko; Kseniia Kurach | Russia | 2:12.12 |
| 9 | Lydia Sampson; Nevin Harrison | United States | 2:12.37 |

==== Final A ====
Competitors raced for positions 1 to 9, with medals going to the top three.

| Rank | Canoeists | Country | Time |
|---|---|---|---|
| 1st place, gold medalist(s) | Sun Mengya; Xu Shixiao | China | 2:02.81 |
| 2nd place, silver medalist(s) | Kincső Takács; Virág Balla | Hungary | 2:04.49 |
| 3rd place, bronze medalist(s) | Volha Klimava; Nadzeya Makarchanka | Belarus | 2:07.74 |
| 4 | Lisa Jahn; Ophelia Preller | Germany | 2:08.18 |
| 5 | Dilnoza Rakhmatova; Nilufar Zokirova | Uzbekistan | 2:08.47 |
| 6 | Mayvihanet Borges; Katherin Nuevo | Cuba | 2:08.63 |
| 7 | Liudmyla Luzan; Anastasiia Chetverikova | Ukraine | 2:08.76 |
| 8 | María Mailliard; Karen Roco | Chile | 2:09.82 |
| 9 | Teruko Kiriake; Manaka Kubota | Japan | 2:12.71 |
