= Canoeing at the 2018 Asian Games =

Asian Games event

- Venue: Bendung Rentang; Jakabaring Lake
- Dates: 21 August – 1 September 2018
- Competitors: 228 from 23 nations

The canoeing races at the 2018 Asian Games in Jakarta and Palembang were contested in three main disciplines: the slalom from 21 to 23 August, and the sprint from 29 August to 1 September. The slalom canoe competition was held at the Bendung Rentang in Majalengka Regency, West Java; whereas the sprint events were staged in Jakabaring Lake at the Jakabaring Sport City, Palembang. Additionally, the games also contested the canoe polo discipline as demonstration sport. Also in part of canoeing event was the dragon boat event.

During a preparation meeting, West Java provincial secretary stated that the quality of the water in Bendung Rentang was polluted by sand and soil mining waste (galian C). According to Indonesian Minister of Public Works and People's Housing Basuki Hadimuljono, the quantity of water in Bandung Rentang was enough, about 15 cubic meters per second, so the speed (water) had met the standard, and to improve the water quality, sand excavation activity around the venue would be stopped for a while.

== Schedule ==
H	Heats	S	Semifinal	F	Final

Event↓/Date →	21st Tue	22nd Wed		23rd Thu		24th Fri	25th Sat	26th Sun	27th Mon	28th Tue	29th Wed		30th Thu	31st Fri		1st Sat
Slalom
Men's C-1	H	S	F													
Men's K-1	H			S	F											
Women's C-1	H			S	F											
Women's K-1	H	S	F													
Sprint
Men's C-1 1000 m													F			
Men's C-2 200 m														H	S	F
Men's C-2 1000 m													F			
Men's K-1 200 m														H	S	F
Men's K-2 1000 m											H	S	F			
Men's K-4 500 m											H	S	F			
Women's C-1 200 m														H	S	F
Women's C-2 500 m													F			
Women's K-1 200 m														H	S	F
Women's K-1 500 m													F			
Women's K-2 500 m																F
Women's K-4 500 m																F

== Medalists ==
=== Slalom ===
==== Men ====
Event	Gold	Silver	Bronze
C-1	Takuya Haneda; Japan	Chen Fangjia; China	Alexandr Kulikov; Kazakhstan
K-1	Quan Xin; China	Kazuya Adachi; Japan	Hermann Husslein; Thailand

==== Women ====
Event	Gold	Silver	Bronze
C-1	Chen Shi; China	Chen Wei-han; Chinese Taipei	Atcharaporn Duanglawa; Thailand
K-1	Aki Yazawa; Japan	Li Tong; China	Chang Chu-han; Chinese Taipei

=== Sprint ===
==== Men ====
Event	Gold	Silver	Bronze
C-1 1000 m	Vadim Menkov; Uzbekistan	Shahriyor Daminov; Tajikistan	Mohammad Nabi Rezaei; Iran
C-2 200 m	China; Xing Song; Li Qiang	Uzbekistan; Artur Guliev; Elyorjon Mamadaliev	Kazakhstan; Merey Medetov; Timur Khaidarov
C-2 1000 m	China; Liu Hao; Wang Hao	Kazakhstan; Sergey Yemelyanov; Timofey Yemelyanov	Uzbekistan; Nurislom Tukhtasin Ugli; Serik Mirbekov
K-1 200 m	Cho Gwang-hee; South Korea	Sergii Tokarnytskyi; Kazakhstan	Mervyn Toh; Singapore
K-2 1000 m	China; Zhang Dong; Bu Tingkai	Kazakhstan; Ilya Golendov; Andrey Yerguchyov	Uzbekistan; Shakhriyor Makhkamov; Shokhrukhbek Azamov
K-4 500 m	Kazakhstan; Ilya Golendov; Alexey Dergunov; Sergii Tokarnytskyi; Yevgeniy Alexeyev	South Korea; Cho Gwang-hee; Cho Jeong-hyun; Choi Min-kyu; Kim Ji-won	Iran; Ahmad Reza Talebian; Peyman Ghavidel; Ali Aghamirzaei; Amin Boudaghi

==== Women ====
Event	Gold	Silver	Bronze
C-1 200 m	Sun Mengya; China	Riska Andriyani; Indonesia	Dilnoza Rakhmatova; Uzbekistan
C-2 500 m	China; Ma Yanan; Sun Mengya	Uzbekistan; Dilnoza Rakhmatova; Nilufar Zokirova	Indonesia; Riska Andriyani; Nurmeni
K-1 200 m	Inna Klinova; Kazakhstan	Li Yue; China	Yuka Ono; Japan
K-1 500 m	Li Yue; China	Hedieh Kazemi; Iran	Lee Sun-ja; South Korea
K-2 500 m	China; Li Yue; Zhou Yu	Uzbekistan; Ekaterina Shubina; Yuliya Borzova	Japan; Yuka Ono; Hideka Tatara
K-4 500 m	China; Ma Qing; Zhou Yu; Yang Jiali; Huang Jieyi	Kazakhstan; Inna Klinova; Irina Podoinikova; Zoya Ananchenko; Viktoriya Kopyova	Uzbekistan; Natalya Kazantseva; Yuliya Borzova; Ekaterina Shubina; Kseniya Kochneva

== Medal table ==
Rank	Nation	Gold	Silver	Bronze	Total
1	China (CHN)	10	3	0	13
2	Kazakhstan (KAZ)	2	4	2	8
3	Japan (JPN)	2	1	2	5
4	Uzbekistan (UZB)	1	3	4	8
5	South Korea (KOR)	1	1	1	3
6	Iran (IRI)	0	1	2	3
7	Chinese Taipei (TPE)	0	1	1	2
7	Indonesia (INA)	0	1	1	2
9	Tajikistan (TJK)	0	1	0	1
10	Thailand (THA)	0	0	2	2
11	Singapore (SGP)	0	0	1	1
Totals (11 entries)		16	16	16	48

== Participating nations ==
A total of 228 athletes from 23 nations competed in canoeing at the 2018 Asian Games:

- Cambodia (2)
- China (22)
- Chinese Taipei (10)
- Hong Kong (3)
- India (17)
- Indonesia (22)
- Iran (17)
- Iraq (1)
- Japan (19)
- Kazakhstan (18)
- Kyrgyzstan (2)
- Macau (3)
- Malaysia (2)
- Myanmar (4)
- North Korea (3)
- Philippines (2)
- Singapore (9)
- South Korea (18)
- Sri Lanka (1)
- Tajikistan (6)
- Thailand (23)
- Uzbekistan (22)
- Vietnam (2)
