= Canoeing at the 2020 Summer Olympics =

Canoeing at the Games of the XXXII Olympiad
- Pictograms for slalom (left) and sprint (right)
- Venue: Sea Forest Waterway; Kasai Canoe Slalom Course
- Dates: 25–30 July 2021 (slalom); 2–7 August 2021 (sprint)
- No. of events: 16

Canoeing was a sport at the 2020 Summer Olympics in Tokyo, and was contested in two main disciplines: canoe slalom, which took place from 25 to 30 July 2021, and canoe sprint, from 2 to 7 August. The slalom competitions were held at the Kasai Canoe Slalom Course; whereas the sprint events were staged at Sea Forest Waterway.

The competition featured 16 events. The programme saw four event changes, all replacements, from 2016. In sprint, the men's C-1 200 metres and men's K-2 200 metres were replaced with women's C-1 200 metres and women's C-2 500 metres. In slalom, the men's C-2 was removed. Women's C-1 was added. These three changes were part of the Olympics' move towards gender equality. In addition, the sprint men's K-4 1000 metres was replaced with a shorter race, the men's K-4 500 metres.

== Competition schedule ==
Legend
H	Heats	¼	Quarter-finals	½	Semi-finals	F	Final

Slalom
Event↓/Date →	Sun 25	Mon 26		Tue 27		Wed 28	Thu 29		Fri 30	
Men's C-1	H	½	F							
Men's K-1						H			½	F
Women's C-1						H	½	F		
Women's K-1	H			½	F					

Sprint
Event↓/Date →	Mon 2		Tue 3		Wed 4		Thu 5		Fri 6		Sat 7	
Men's C-1 1000 m									H	¼	½	F
Men's C-2 1000 m	H	¼	½	F								
Men's K-1 200 m					H	¼	½	F				
Men's K-1 1000 m	H	¼	½	F								
Men's K-2 1000 m					H	¼	½	F				
Men's K-4 500 m									H		½	F
Women's C-1 200 m					H	¼	½	F				
Women's C-2 500 m									H	¼	½	F
Women's K-1 200 m	H	¼	½	F								
Women's K-1 500 m					H	¼	½	F				
Women's K-2 500 m	H	¼	½	F								
Women's K-4 500 m									H		½	F

== Participating nations ==
Below is the list of NOCs participants in the canoeing competition at the 2020 Summer Olympics.

- Algeria (1)
- Andorra (1)
- Argentina (4)
- Australia (16)
- Austria (5)
- Belarus (12)
- Belgium (4)
- Belize (1)
- Brazil (5)
- Bulgaria (1)
- Canada (18)
- Chile (2)
- China (18)
- Chinese Taipei (1)
- Cook Islands (3)
- Croatia (3)
- Cuba (5)
- Czech Republic (9)
- Denmark (4)
- Egypt (2)
- France (13)
- Germany (21)
- Great Britain (8)
- Hungary (18)
- Iran (1)
- Ireland (1)
- Italy (7)
- Japan (12) Hosts
- Kazakhstan (7)
- Latvia (1)
- Lithuania (1)
- Mexico (1)
- Moldova (3)
- Morocco (2)
- Mozambique (1)
- Netherlands (1)
- New Zealand (8)
- Nigeria (1)
- Norway (1)
- Poland (13)
- Portugal (8)
- Refugee Olympic Team (1)
- Romania (2)
- ROC (17)
- Samoa (3)
- São Tomé and Príncipe (2)
- Senegal (1)
- Serbia (3)
- Slovakia (9)
- Slovenia (6)
- South Korea (1)
- Spain (15)
- Sweden (3)
- Switzerland (3)
- Thailand (1)
- Tunisia (4)
- Ukraine (11)
- United States (4)
- Uzbekistan (2)

== Medal summary ==
=== Medal table ===
* Host nation (Japan)

Rank	NOC	Gold	Silver	Bronze	Total
1	Hungary	3	2	1	6
2	New Zealand	3	0	0	3
3	Germany	2	1	4	7
4	Australia	2	0	1	3
5	China	1	2	0	3
6	Czech Republic	1	1	1	3
7	Brazil	1	0	0	1
7	Cuba	1	0	0	1
7	Slovenia	1	0	0	1
7	United States	1	0	0	1
11	Spain	0	3	0	3
12	Canada	0	1	1	2
12	Great Britain	0	1	1	2
12	Poland	0	1	1	2
12	Slovakia	0	1	1	2
12	Ukraine	0	1	1	2
17	Belarus	0	1	0	1
17	Italy	0	1	0	1
19	Denmark	0	0	2	2
20	Moldova	0	0	1	1
20	Portugal	0	0	1	1
Totals (21 entries)		16	16	16	48

=== Slalom ===
Games	Gold	Silver	Bronze
Men's canoe	Benjamin Savšek; Slovenia	Lukáš Rohan; Czech Republic	Sideris Tasiadis; Germany
Men's kayak	Jiří Prskavec; Czech Republic	Jakub Grigar; Slovakia	Hannes Aigner; Germany
Women's canoe	Jessica Fox; Australia	Mallory Franklin; Great Britain	Andrea Herzog; Germany
Women's kayak	Ricarda Funk; Germany	Maialen Chourraut; Spain	Jessica Fox; Australia

=== Sprint ===
Men

Event	Gold		Silver		Bronze	
C-1 1000 metres	Isaquias Queiroz; Brazil	4:04.408	Liu Hao; China	4:05.724	Serghei Tarnovschi; Moldova	4:06.069
C-2 1000 metres	Cuba; Serguey Torres; Fernando Jorge	3:24.995; OB	China; Liu Hao; Zheng Pengfei	3:25.198	Germany; Sebastian Brendel; Tim Hecker	3:25.615
K-1 200 metres	Sándor Tótka; Hungary	35.035	Manfredi Rizza; Italy	35.080	Liam Heath; Great Britain	35.202
K-1 1000 metres	Bálint Kopasz; Hungary	3:20.643; OB	Ádám Varga; Hungary	3:22.431	Fernando Pimenta; Portugal	3:22.478
K-2 1000 metres	Australia; Jean van der Westhuyzen; Thomas Green	3:15.280	Germany; Max Hoff; Jacob Schopf	3:15.584	Czech Republic; Josef Dostál; Radek Šlouf	3:16.106
K-4 500 metres	Germany; Max Rendschmidt; Ronald Rauhe; Tom Liebscher; Max Lemke	1:22.219	Spain; Saúl Craviotto; Marcus Walz; Carlos Arévalo; Rodrigo Germade	1:22.445	Slovakia; Samuel Baláž; Denis Myšák; Erik Vlček; Adam Botek	1:23.534

Women

Event	Gold		Silver		Bronze	
C-1 200 metres	Nevin Harrison; United States	45.932	Laurence Vincent-Lapointe; Canada	46.786	Liudmyla Luzan; Ukraine	47.034
C-2 500 metres	China; Xu Shixiao; Sun Mengya	1:55.495; OB	Ukraine; Liudmyla Luzan; Anastasiia Chetverikova	1:57.499	Canada; Laurence Vincent Lapointe; Katie Vincent	1:59.041
K-1 200 metres	Lisa Carrington; New Zealand	38.120; OB	Teresa Portela; Spain	38.883	Emma Jørgensen; Denmark	38.901
K-1 500 metres	Lisa Carrington; New Zealand	1:51.216	Tamara Csipes; Hungary	1:51.855	Emma Jørgensen; Denmark	1:52.773
K-2 500 metres	New Zealand; Lisa Carrington; Caitlin Regal	1:35.785; OB	Poland; Karolina Naja; Anna Puławska	1:36.753	Hungary; Danuta Kozák; Dóra Bodonyi	1:36.867
K-4 500 metres	Hungary; Danuta Kozák; Tamara Csipes; Anna Kárász; Dóra Bodonyi	1:35.463	Belarus; Marharyta Makhneva; Nadzeya Papok; Volha Khudzenka; Maryna Litvinchuk	1:36.073	Poland; Karolina Naja; Anna Puławska; Justyna Iskrzycka; Helena Wiśniewska	1:36.445

== See also ==
- Canoeing at the 2018 Asian Games
- Canoeing at the 2018 Summer Youth Olympics
- Canoeing at the 2019 African Games
- Canoe sprint at the 2019 European Games
- Canoeing at the 2019 Pan American Games
- Paracanoeing at the 2020 Summer Paralympics
