= Canoeing at the 2022 Asian Games – Women's C-2 500 metres =

Women's C-2 500 metres at the 2022 Asian Games
- Venue: Fuyang Water Sports Centre
- Date: 2 October 2023
- Competitors: 18 from 9 nations

Medalists
gold medal	Xu Shixiao; Sun Mengya	China
silver medal	Rufina Iskakova; Mariya Brovkova	Kazakhstan
bronze medal	Orasa Thiangkathok; Aphinya Sroichit	Thailand

The women's sprint C-2 (canoe double) 500 metres competition at the 2022 Asian Games was held on 2 October 2023.

== Schedule ==
All times are China Standard Time (UTC+08:00)

Date	Time	Event
Monday, 2 October 2023	10:50	Final

== Results ==
Rank	Team	Time
1st place, gold medalist(s)	China (CHN); Xu Shixiao; Sun Mengya	2:01.409
2nd place, silver medalist(s)	Kazakhstan (KAZ); Rufina Iskakova; Mariya Brovkova	2:08.125
3rd place, bronze medalist(s)	Thailand (THA); Orasa Thiangkathok; Aphinya Sroichit	2:08.257
4	Vietnam (VIE); Nguyễn Hồng Thái; Nguyễn Thị Hương	2:08.695
5	Uzbekistan (UZB); Gulbakhor Fayzieva; Nilufar Zokirova	2:09.866
6	Indonesia (INA); Nurmeni; Riska Andriyani	2:11.699
7	Iran (IRI); Maedeh Shourgashti; Hiva Afzali	2:12.041
8	Japan (JPN); Megumi Tsubota; Mio Kobayashi	2:16.868
9	India (IND); Megha Pradeep; Shivani Verma	2:17.614
