= Canoeing at the 2020 Summer Olympics – Women's C-1 200 metres =

Olympic canoeing event

Women's C-1 200 metres at the Games of the XXXII Olympiad
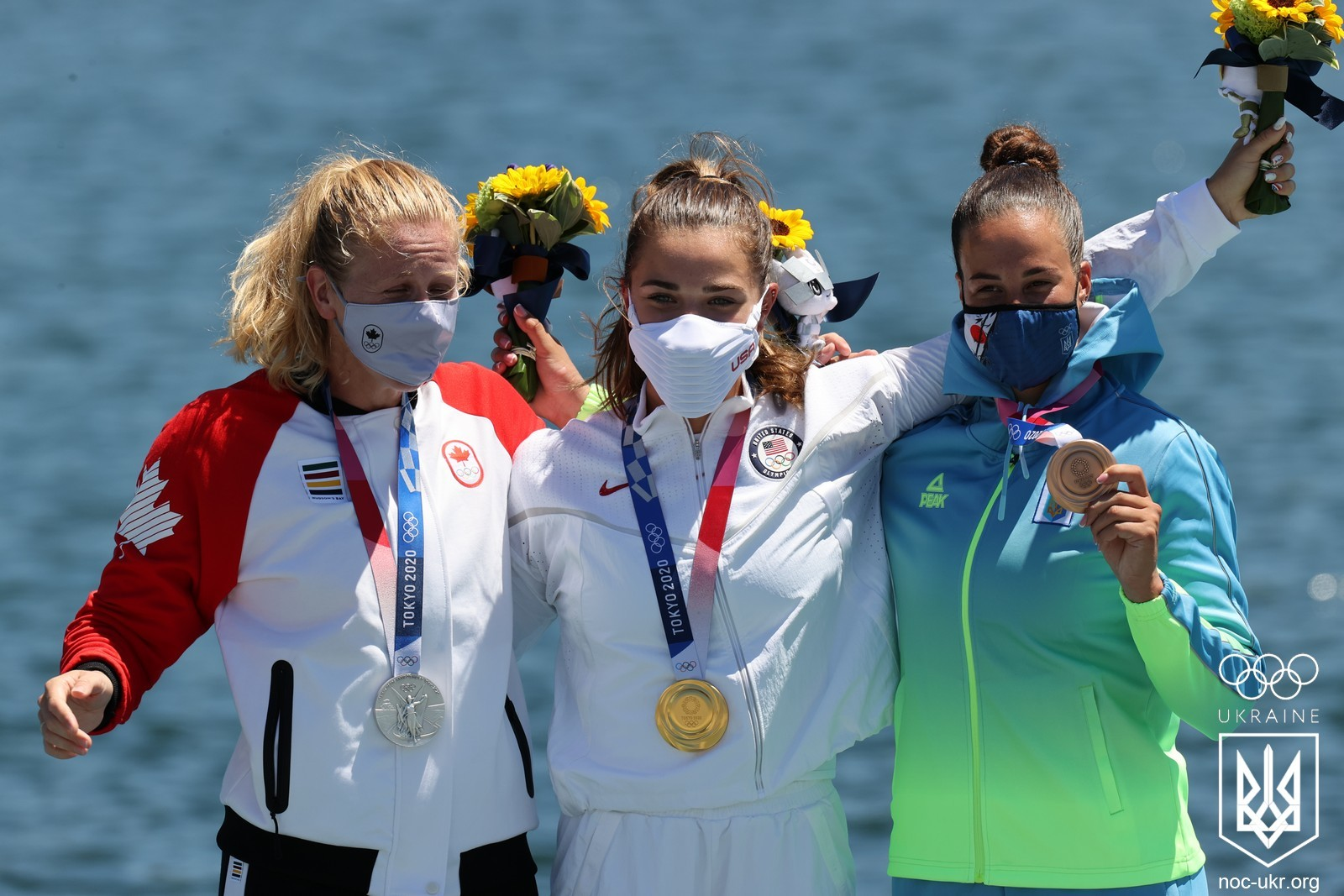
- Venue: Sea Forest Waterway
- Dates: 4 August 2021 (heats and quarterfinal); 5 August 2021 (semifinal & final)
- Competitors: 32 from 22 nations
- Winning time: 45.932

Medalists
1st place, gold medalist(s)		Nevin Harrison; United States
2nd place, silver medalist(s)		Laurence Vincent Lapointe; Canada
3rd place, bronze medalist(s)		Liudmyla Luzan; Ukraine

The women's C-1 200 metres sprint canoeing event at the 2020 Summer Olympics took place on 4 and 5 August 2021 at the Sea Forest Waterway. At least 12 canoeists from at least 12 nations competed.

== Background ==
This was the debut appearance of the event, replacing the men's C-1 200 metres as the Olympics moved towards gender equality. The women's C-1 200 metres has been an event at the ICF Canoe Sprint World Championships in 2010.

2019 World Champion teenager Nevin Harrison of the United States qualified for the event.

== Qualification ==
A National Olympic Committee (NOC) could only qualify one boat (and thus earn one women's canoe quota place) in the event; however, NOCs could enter up to 2 boats in the event if they had enough women's canoe quota places from other events (that is, the C-2). A total of 12 qualification places were available, initially allocated as follows:

- 1 place for the host nation, Japan, if it did not qualify any women's canoe quota places
- 5 places awarded through the 2019 ICF Canoe Sprint World Championships
- 5 places awarded through continental tournaments, 1 per continent
- 1 place awarded through the 2021 Canoe Sprint World Cup Stage 2.

Qualifying places were awarded to the NOC, not to the individual canoeist who earned the place.

The Oceania spot was re-allocated to the World Championships, going to China. As the Americas continental tournament was cancelled, that place was also allocated through the World Championships, but the place ultimately went to Bulgaria because insufficient athletes had entered from the Americas.

As Japan qualified a boat in the women's C-2 event, its host nation place was also reallocated through the World Championships. This made a total of eight World Championship places that were awarded as follows:

Rank	Canoeist	Nation	Qualification	Selected competitor
1	Nevin Harrison	United States	Quota #1 in C-1 200 m	Nevin Harrison
2	Olesia Romasenko	ROC	Quota #2 in C-1 200 m	
3	Alena Nazdrova	Belarus	Quota #3 in C-1 200 m	
4	María Mailliard	Chile	Earned quota in C-2 500 m	Could enter via C-2
5	Katie Vincent	Canada	Quota #4 in C-1 200 m	Katie Vincent
6	Dorota Borowska	Poland	Quota #5 in C-1 200 m	
7	Anastasiia Chetverikova	Ukraine	Earned quota in C-2 500 m	Could enter via C-2
8	Zhang Luqi	China	Reallocated Oceania quota in C-1 200 m	
9	Staniliya Stamenova	Bulgaria	Reallocated Americas quota in C-1 200 m	
10	Bianka Nagy	Hungary	Reallocated host quota in C-1 200 m	

Asia's continental place was earned by Thailand, Europe's by Spain, and Africa's by Nigeria. Croatia earned the final spot at the World Cup.:

Nation	Qualification	Selected competitor
Nigeria	Africa quota in C-1 200 m	
Thailand	Asia quota in C-1 200 m	Orasa Thiangkathok
Spain	Europe quota in C-1 200 m	
Croatia	World Cup quota in C-1 200 m	

Nations that could enter (additional) boats due to qualifying in the C-2:

Nation	Selected competitor 1	Selected competitor 2
Australia		
Belarus		2 boat limit
Chile		
China		2 boat limit
Cuba		
Germany		
Hungary		2 boat limit
Japan		
Kazakhstan		
Moldova		
ROC		2 boat limit
Ukraine		
Uzbekistan		

== Competition format ==
Sprint canoeing uses a four-round format for events with at least 11 boats, with heats, quarterfinals, semifinals, and finals. The details for each round depend on how many boats ultimately enter.

The course is a flatwater course 9 metres wide. The name of the event describes the particular format within sprint canoeing. The "C" format means a canoe, with the canoeist kneeling and using a single-bladed paddle to paddle and steer (as opposed to a kayak, with a seated canoeist, double-bladed paddle, and foot-operated rudder). The "1" is the number of canoeists in each boat. The "200 metres" is the distance of each race.

== Schedule ==
The event was held over two consecutive days, with two rounds per day. All sessions started at 9:30 a.m. local time, though there are multiple events with races in each session.

Legend
H	Heats	¼	Quarter-finals	½	Semi-finals	F	Final

Sprint
Event↓/Date →	Mon 2	Tue 3	Wed 4		Thu 5		Fri 6	Sat 7
Women's C-1 200 m			H	¼	½	F		

== Results ==
=== Heats ===
Progression System: 1st-2nd to SF, rest to QF

==== Heat 1 ====
Rank	Lane	Canoer	Country	Time	Notes
1	3	Liudmyla Luzan	Ukraine	45.571	OB, SF
2	6	Lin Wenjun	China	46.449	SF
3	2	Antía Jácome	Spain	46.691	QF
4	5	María Mailliard	Chile	47.557	QF
5	4	Irina Andreeva	ROC	48.192	QF
6	1	Nilufar Zokirova	Uzbekistan	49.686	QF
7	7	Manaka Kubota	Japan	50.608	QF

==== Heat 2 ====
Rank	Lane	Canoer	Country	Time	Notes
1	5	Nevin Harrison	United States	44.938	OB, SF
2	3	Katherin Nuevo Segura	Cuba	46.533	SF
3	1	Virág Balla	Hungary	46.852	QF
4	4	Anastasiia Chetverikova	Ukraine	47.472	QF
5	7	Bernadette Wallace	Australia	48.209	QF
6	2	Margarita Torlopova	Kazakhstan	49.721	QF
7	6	Maria Olărașu	Moldova	50.607	QF

==== Heat 3 ====
Rank	Lane	Canoer	Country	Time	Notes
1	3	Katie Vincent	Canada	46.391	SF
2	5	Yarisleidis Cirilo Duboys	Cuba	47.267	SF
3	1	Ayomide Emmanuel Bello	Nigeria	47.539	QF
4	4	Katie Reid	Great Britain	47.876	QF
5	6	Orasa Thiangkathok	Thailand	48.262	QF
6	2	Josephine Bulmer	Australia	53.354	QF

==== Heat 4 ====
Rank	Lane	Canoer	Country	Time	Notes
1	2	Laurence Vincent Lapointe	Canada	45.408	SF
2	5	Olesia Romasenko	ROC	46.126	SF
3	4	Alena Nazdrova	Belarus	46.731	QF
4	3	Lisa Jahn	Germany	47.439	QF
5	1	Dilnoza Rakhmatova	Uzbekistan	47.716	QF
6	6	Teruko Kiriake	Japan	50.326	QF

==== Heat 5 ====
Rank	Lane	Canoer	Country	Time	Notes
1	5	Dorota Borowska	Poland	47.655	SF
2	6	Kincső Takács	Hungary	47.977	SF
3	1	Daniela Cociu	Moldova	48.338	QF
4	3	Staniliya Stamenova	Bulgaria	48.477	QF
5	2	Sophie Koch	Germany	48.601	QF
6	4	Vanesa Tot	Croatia	49.280	QF

=== Quarterfinals ===
Progression System: 1st-2nd to SF, rest out.

==== Quarterfinal 1 ====
Rank	Lane	Canoer	Country	Time	Notes
1	6	Antía Jácome	Spain	45.668	SF
2	3	María Mailliard	Chile	46.122	SF
3	4	Anastasiia Chetverikova	Ukraine	46.509	
4	7	Bernadette Wallace	Australia	48.330	
5	2	Orasa Thiangkathok	Thailand	48.559	
6	8	Nilufar Zokirova	Uzbekistan	48.995	
7	9	Maria Olărașu	Moldova	49.002	
8	1	Teruko Kiriake	Japan	49.413	

==== Quarterfinal 2 ====
Rank	Lane	Canoer	Country	Time	Notes
1	5	Virág Balla	Hungary	46.218	SF
2	6	Irina Andreeva	ROC	46.637	SF
3	2	Dilnoza Rakhmatova	Uzbekistan	46.645	
4	3	Katie Reid	Great Britain	47.821	
5	1	Vanesa Tot	Croatia	48.375	
6	4	Daniela Cociu	Moldova	48.594	
7	6	Margarita Torlopova	Kazakhstan	49.051	

==== Quarterfinal 3 ====
Rank	Lane	Canoer	Country	Time	Notes
1	4	Alena Nazdrova	Belarus	46.950	SF
2	6	Lisa Jahn	Germany	47.049	SF
3	5	Ayomide Emmanuel Bello	Nigeria	47.326	
4	2	Sophie Koch	Germany	48.891	
5	3	Staniliya Stamenova	Bulgaria	48.939	
6	1	Manaka Kubota	Japan	49.769	
7	7	Josephine Bulmer	Australia	51.474	

=== Semifinals ===
Progression System: 1st-4th to Final A, rest to Final B.

==== Semifinal 1 ====
Rank	Lane	Canoer	Country	Time	Notes
1	5	Liudmyla Luzan	Ukraine	47.339	FA
2	2	Olesia Romasenko	ROC	47.368	FA
3	4	Katie Vincent	Canada	47.604	FA
4	3	Dorota Borowska	Poland	47.703	FA
5	1	María Mailliard	Chile	48.198	FB
6	7	Virág Balla	Hungary	48.257	FB
7	8	Lisa Jahn	Germany	49.136	FB
8	6	Katherin Nuevo Segura	Cuba	49.242	FB

==== Semifinal 2 ====
Rank	Lane	Canoer	Country	Time	Notes
1	4	Nevin Harrison	United States	46.697	FA
2	3	Lin Wenjun	China	47.161	FA
3	5	Laurence Vincent Lapointe	Canada	47.294	FA
4	7	Antía Jácome	Spain	47.414	FA
5	1	Alena Nazdrova	Belarus	48.120	FB
6	6	Yarisleidis Cirilo Duboys	Cuba	48.375	FB
7	8	Irina Andreeva	ROC	49.147	FB
8	2	Kincső Takács	Hungary	49.178	FB

=== Finals ===
==== Final A ====
Rank	Lane	Canoer	Country	Time	Notes
1st place, gold medalist(s)	4	Nevin Harrison	United States	45.932	
2nd place, silver medalist(s)	2	Laurence Vincent Lapointe	Canada	46.786	
3rd place, bronze medalist(s)	5	Liudmyla Luzan	Ukraine	47.034	
4	1	Dorota Borowska	Poland	47.116	
5	8	Antía Jácome	Spain	47.226	
6	6	Lin Wenjun	China	47.608	
7	3	Olesia Romasenko	ROC	47.777	
8	7	Katie Vincent	Canada	47.834	

==== Final B ====
Rank	Lane	Canoer	Country	Time	Notes
9	3	Virág Balla	Hungary	47.560	
10	5	María Mailliard	Chile	47.610	
11	4	Alena Nazdrova	Belarus	48.085	
12	6	Yarisleidis Cirilo Duboys	Cuba	48.582	
13	7	Lisa Jahn	Germany	48.798	
14	8	Kincső Takács	Hungary	48.921	
15	2	Irina Andreeva	ROC	48.930	
16	1	Katherin Nuevo Segura	Cuba	49.024	
