= 2022 ICF Canoe Sprint World Championships – Women's C-2 500 metres =

Women's C-2 500 metres at the 2022 ICF Canoe Sprint World Championships
- Venue: Lake Banook
- Location: Dartmouth, Canada
- Dates: 3–6 August
- Competitors: 28 from 14 nations
- Winning time: 2:01.26

Medalists
gold medal	Xu Shixiao; Sun Mengya	China
silver medal	Liudmyla Luzan; Anastasiia Chetverikova	Ukraine
bronze medal	Giada Bragato; Bianka Nagy	Hungary

The women's C-2 500 metres competition at the 2022 ICF Canoe Sprint World Championships in Dartmouth took place on Lake Banook.

== Schedule ==
The schedule is as follows:

Date	Time	Round
Wednesday 3 August 2022	12:00	Heats
Friday 5 August 2022	10:33	Semifinal
Saturday 6 August 2022	11:34	Final

== Results ==
=== Heats ===
The fastest three boats in each heat advanced directly to the final.
The next four fastest boats in each heat, plus the fastest remaining boat advanced to the semifinal.

==== Heat 1 ====
Rank	Canoeist	Country	Time	Notes
1	Yarisleidis Duboys; Katherin Segura	Cuba	2:02.12	QF
2	Axelle Renard; Eugénie Dorange	France	2:04.87	QF
3	Giada Bragato; Bianka Nagy	Hungary	2:05.31	QF
4	Katie Vincent; Sloan Mackenzie	Canada	2:05.34	QS
5	Paula Gómez; Karen Roco	Chile	2:07.45	QS
6	Azusa Murphy; Andreea Ghizila	United States	2:09.38	QS
7	María Moreno; María Prats	Spain	2:09.42	QS
8	Nicol Guzmán; Lucero Mendoza	Mexico	2:15.61	qS

==== Heat 2 ====
Rank	Canoeist	Country	Time	Notes
1	Xu Shixiao; Sun Mengya	China	1:58.66	QF
2	Liudmyla Luzan; Anastasiia Chetverikova	Ukraine	2:00.82	QF
3	Lisa Jahn; Sophie Koch	Germany	2:02.82	QF
4	Daniela Cociu; Maria Olărașu	Moldova	2:04.45	QS
5	Sylwia Szczerbińska; Julia Walczak	Poland	2:05.00	QS
6	Bethany Gill; Afton Fitzhenry	Great Britain	2:10.32	QS

=== Semifinal ===
The fastest three boats advanced to the final.

Rank	Canoeist	Country	Time	Notes
1	Katie Vincent; Sloan Mackenzie	Canada	2:06.37	QF
2	Daniela Cociu; Maria Olărașu	Moldova	2:08.31	QF
3	Sylwia Szczerbińska; Julia Walczak	Poland	2:08.93	QF
4	Bethany Gill; Afton Fitzhenry	Great Britain	2:11.01	
5	Paula Gómez; Karen Roco	Chile	2:11.89	
6	María Moreno; María Prats	Spain	2:12.24	
7	Nicol Guzmán; Lucero Mendoza	Mexico	2:15.72	
8	Azusa Murphy; Andreea Ghizila	United States	2:16.67	

=== Final ===
Competitors raced for positions 1 to 9, with medals going to the top three.

Rank	Canoeist	Country	Time	Notes
1st place, gold medalist(s)	Xu Shixiao; Sun Mengya	China	2:01.26	
2nd place, silver medalist(s)	Liudmyla Luzan; Anastasiia Chetverikova	Ukraine	2:03.32	
3rd place, bronze medalist(s)	Giada Bragato; Bianka Nagy	Hungary	2:04.70	
4	Sylwia Szczerbińska; Julia Walczak	Poland	2:06.45	
5	Lisa Jahn; Sophie Koch	Germany	2:06.67	
6	Katie Vincent; Sloan Mackenzie	Canada	2:06.45	
7	Daniela Cociu; Maria Olărașu	Moldova	2:08.57	
8	Axelle Renard; Eugénie Dorange	France	2:08.76	
9	Yarisleidis Duboys; Katherin Segura	Cuba	2:09.71	
