= Canoeing at the 2026 Asian Games – Women's C-2 500 metres =

Women's C-2 500 metres at the 2026 Asian Games
- Venue: Miyoshi Lake
- Date: 23–25 September 2026
- Competitors: 22 from 11 nations

Medalists
gold medal	Sun Mengya; Ma Yanan	China
silver medal	Shokhsanam Sherzodova; Nilufar Zokirova	Uzbekistan
bronze medal	Nguyễn Thị Hương; Diệp Thị Hương	Vietnam

The women's sprint C-2 (canoe double) 500 metres competition at the 2026 Asian Games was held on 23 and 25 September 2026.

== Schedule ==
All times are Japan Standard Time (UTC+09:00)

Date	Time	Event
Wednesday, 23 September 2026	14:20	Heats
Friday, 25 September 2026	10:20	Semifinal
Friday, 25 September 2026	12:00	Final

== Results ==
=== Heats ===
- Qualification: 1–3 → Final (QF), Rest → Semifinal (QS)

==== Heat 1 ====
Rank	Team	Time	Notes
1	Uzbekistan (UZB); Shokhsanam Sherzodova; Nilufar Zokirova	2:01.077	QF
2	Vietnam (VIE); Nguyễn Thị Hương; Diệp Thị Hương	2:01.426	QF
3	Thailand (THA); Orasa Thiangkathok; Aphinya Sroichit	2:05.101	QF
4	North Korea (PRK); Jong Se Yong; Cha Un Yong	2:07.999	QS
5	Iran (IRI); Hadiyeh Kheirabadiasl; Maede Shoorgashti	2:12.441	QS
6	Mongolia (MGL); Maria Batgerel; Rina Batgerel	4:34.075	QS

==== Heat 2 ====
Rank	Team	Time	Notes
1	China (CHN); Sun Mengya; Ma Yanan	1:55.959	QF
2	Kazakhstan (KAZ); Mariya Brovkova; Ulyana Kisseleva	1:58.282	QF
3	Indonesia (INA); Dayumin; Sella Monim	2:02.872	QF
4	Japan (JPN); Mio Kobayashi; Teruko Kiriake	2:02.928	QS
5	India (IND); Megha Pradeep; Neha Devi Leichonbam	2:08.713	QS

=== Semifinal ===
- Qualification: 1–3 → Final (QF)

Rank	Athlete	Time	Notes
1	Iran (IRI); Hadiyeh Kheirabadiasl; Maede Shoorgashti	2:06.340	FA
2	North Korea (PRK); Jong Se Yong; Cha Un Yong	2:06.696	FA
3	Japan (JPN); Mio Kobayashi; Teruko Kiriake	2:07.177	FA
4	India (IND); Megha Pradeep; Neha Devi Leichonbam	2:08.306	
5	Mongolia (MGL); Maria Batgerel; Rina Batgerel	4:16.153	

=== Final ===
Rank	Athlete	Time	Notes
1st place, gold medalist(s)	China (CHN); Sun Mengya; Ma Yanan	1:54.700	
2nd place, silver medalist(s)	Uzbekistan (UZB); Shokhsanam Sherzodova; Nilufar Zokirova	1:56.419	
3rd place, bronze medalist(s)	Vietnam (VIE); Nguyễn Thị Hương; Diệp Thị Hương	1:57.255	
4	Kazakhstan (KAZ); Mariya Brovkova; Ulyana Kisseleva	1:58.689	
5	Thailand (THA); Orasa Thiangkathok; Aphinya Sroichit	2:01.662	
6	Japan (JPN); Mio Kobayashi; Teruko Kiriake	2:04.249	
7	Iran (IRI); Hadiyeh Kheirabadiasl; Maede Shoorgashti	2:04.598	
8	Indonesia (INA); Dayumin; Sella Monim	2:04.598	
9	North Korea (PRK); Jong Se Yong; Cha Un Yong	2:04.598	
