= Canoeing at the 2020 Summer Olympics – Women's C-2 500 metres =

Olympic canoeing event

Women's C-2 500 metres at the Games of the XXXII Olympiad
- Canoeing pictogram
- Venue: Sea Forest Waterway
- Dates: 6 August 2021 (heats and quarterfinal); 7 August 2021 (semifinal & final)
- Competitors: 28 (14 boats) from 14 nations
- Winning time: 1:55.495

Medalists
1st place, gold medalist(s)		Xu Shixiao; Sun Mengya	China
2nd place, silver medalist(s)		Liudmyla Luzan; Anastasiia Chetverikova	Ukraine
3rd place, bronze medalist(s)		Laurence Vincent Lapointe; Katie Vincent	Canada

The women's C-2 500 metres sprint canoeing event at the 2020 Summer Olympics took place on 6 and 7 August 2021 at the Sea Forest Waterway. 26 canoeists (13 boats of 2) from 13 nations competed.

== Background ==
This was the debut appearance of the event, replacing the men's K-2 200 metres as the Olympics moved towards gender equality.

The reigning World Champions were Sun Mengya and Xu Shixiao of China.

== Qualification ==
A National Olympic Committee (NOC) could enter only 1 qualified boat (2 canoeists) in the event. A total of 13 qualification places were available, initially allocated as follows:

- 8 places awarded through the 2019 ICF Canoe Sprint World Championships
- 5 places awarded through continental tournaments, 1 per continent

Qualifying places were awarded to the NOC, not to the individual canoeists who earned the place.

The Americas continental tournament was cancelled; that place was allocated through the World Championships, with the place going to Japan. The Africa place was reallocated as well, with Europe receiving a second spot.

== Competition format ==
Sprint canoeing uses a four-round format for events with at least 11 boats, with heats, quarterfinals, semifinals, and finals. For a 13-boat event, the rounds are as follows:

- Heats: Two heats of 6 and 7 boats each. The top 2 boats in each heat (4 boats total) advance directly to the semifinals, with all others (9 boats) going to the quarterfinals.
- Quarterfinals: Two heats of 4 and 5 boats each. The top 3 boats in each heat (6 boats total) advance to the semifinals, with the remaining 3 boats out of medal contention and competing in the consolation Final B.
- Semifinals: Two heats of 5 boats each. The top 4 boats in each heat (8 boats total) advance to the medal Final A, with the remaining 2 boats out of medal contention and competing in consolation Final B.
- Finals: Final A consists of the top 8 boats, awarding the medals as well as 4th through 8th place. Final B features the remaining 5 boats, awarding 9th through 13th places.

The course is a flatwater course 9 metres wide. The name of the event describes the particular format within sprint canoeing. The "C" format means a canoe, with the canoeist kneeling and using a single-bladed paddle to paddle and steer (as opposed to a kayak, with a seated canoeist, double-bladed paddle, and foot-operated rudder). The "2" is the number of canoeists in each boat. The "500 metres" is the distance of each race.

== Schedule ==
The event was held over two consecutive days, with two rounds per day. All sessions started at 9:30 a.m. local time, though there are multiple events with races in each session.

Legend
H	Heats	¼	Quarter-finals	½	Semi-finals	F	Final

Sprint
Event↓/Date →	Mon 2	Tue 3	Wed 4	Thu 5	Fri 6		Sat 7	
Women's C-2 500 m					H	1/4	1/2	F

== Results ==
=== Heats ===
Progression System: 1st-2nd to SF, rest to QF.

==== Heat 1 ====
Rank	Lane	Canoer	Country	Time	Notes
1	6	Xu Shixiao; Sun Mengya	China	1:57.870	OB, SF
2	5	Lisa Jahn; Sophie Koch	Germany	2:01.184	SF
3	1	Laurence Vincent Lapointe; Katie Vincent	Canada	2:02.170	QF
4	3	Dilnoza Rakhmatova; Nilufar Zokirova	Uzbekistan	2:04.854	QF
5	1	Irina Andreeva; Olesia Romasenko	ROC	2:05.604	QF
6	4	Karen Roco; María Mailliard	Chile	2:09.820	QF
7	7	Bernadette Wallace; Josephine Bulmer	Australia	2:11.322	QF

==== Heat 2 ====
Rank	Lane	Canoer	Country	Time	Notes
1	3	Liudmyla Luzan; Anastasiia Chetverikova	Ukraine	2:01.156	SF
2	4	Virág Balla; Kincső Takács	Hungary	2:02.344	SF
3	5	Yarisleidis Cirilo Duboys; Katherin Nuevo Segura	Cuba	2:03.229	QF
4	7	Daniela Cociu; Maria Olărașu	Moldova	2:06.070	QF
5	1	Svetlana Ussova; Margarita Torlopova	Kazakhstan	2:09.024	QF
6	6	Daryna Pikuleva; Nadzeya Makarchanka	Belarus	2:09.799	QF
7	2	Manaka Kubota; Teruko Kiriake	Japan	2:16.791	QF

=== Quarterfinals ===
Progression System: 1st-3rd to SF, rest to Final B.

==== Quarterfinal 1 ====
Rank	Lane	Canoer	Country	Time	Notes
1	5	Laurence Vincent Lapointe; Katie Vincent	Canada	2:02.259	SF
2	4	Daniela Cociu; Maria Olărașu	Moldova	2:03.434	SF
3	2	Daryna Pikuleva; Nadzeya Makarchanka	Belarus	2:04.951	SF
4	3	Svetlana Ussova; Margarita Torlopova	Kazakhstan	2:06.179	FB
5	6	Bernadette Wallace; Josephine Bulmer	Australia	2:11.180	FB

==== Quarterfinal 2 ====
Rank	Lane	Canoer	Country	Time	Notes
1	5	Yarisleidis Cirilo Duboys; Katherin Nuevo Segura	Cuba	2:03.282	SF
2	4	Dilnoza Rakhmatova; Nilufar Zokirova	Uzbekistan	2:04.450	SF
3	3	Irina Andreeva; Olesia Romasenko	ROC	2:04.703	SF
4	6	Karen Roco; María Mailliard	Chile	2:04.969	FB
5	2	Manaka Kubota; Teruko Kiriake	Japan	2:08.849	FB

=== Semifinals ===
Progression System: 1st-4th to Final A, rest to Final B.

==== Semifinal 1 ====
Rank	Lane	Canoer	Country	Time	Notes
1	4	Xu Shixiao; Sun Mengya	China	2:01.369	FA
2	3	Yarisleidis Cirilo Duboys; Katherin Nuevo Segura	Cuba	2:03.655	FA
3	5	Virág Balla; Kincső Takács	Hungary	2:04.545	FA
4	6	Daniela Cociu; Maria Olărașu	Moldova	2:05.910	FA
5	2	Daryna Pikuleva; Nadzeya Makarchanka	Belarus	2:07.205	FB

==== Semifinal 2 ====
Rank	Lane	Canoer	Country	Time	Notes
1	4	Liudmyla Luzan; Anastasiia Chetverikova	Ukraine	2:02.893	FA
2	3	Laurence Vincent Lapointe; Katie Vincent	Canada	2:04.316	FA
3	5	Lisa Jahn; Sophie Koch	Germany	2:04.749	FA
4	2	Irina Andreeva; Olesia Romasenko	ROC	2:04.968	FA
5	6	Dilnoza Rakhmatova; Nilufar Zokirova	Uzbekistan	2:09.614	FB

=== Finals ===
==== Final A ====
Rank	Lane	Canoer	Country	Time	Notes
1st place, gold medalist(s)	5	Xu Shixiao; Sun Mengya	China	1:55.495	OB
2nd place, silver medalist(s)	4	Liudmyla Luzan; Anastasiia Chetverikova	Ukraine	1:57.499	
3rd place, bronze medalist(s)	6	Laurence Vincent Lapointe; Katie Vincent	Canada	1:59.041	
4	2	Lisa Jahn; Sophie Koch	Germany	1:59.943	
5	7	Virág Balla; Kincső Takács	Hungary	2:00.289	
6	3	Yarisleidis Cirilo Duboys; Katherin Nuevo Segura	Cuba	2:01.623	
7	1	Daniela Cociu; Maria Olărașu	Moldova	2:01.750	
8	8	Irina Andreeva; Olesia Romasenko	ROC	2:04.875	

==== Final B ====
Rank	Lane	Canoer	Country	Time	Notes
9	3	Karen Roco; María Mailliard	Chile	2:02.698	
10	5	Daryna Pikuleva; Nadzeya Makarchanka	Belarus	2:04.351	
11	4	Dilnoza Rakhmatova; Nilufar Zokirova	Uzbekistan	2:04.658	
12	6	Svetlana Ussova; Margarita Torlopova	Kazakhstan	2:04.859	
13	2	Bernadette Wallace; Josephine Bulmer	Australia	2:05.698	
14	7	Manaka Kubota; Teruko Kiriake	Japan	2:06.196	
