= Canoeing at the 2018 Asian Games – Women's C-2 500 metres =

Asian Games competition

Women's C-2 500 metres at the 2018 Asian Games
- Venue: Jakabaring Lake
- Date: 30 August 2018
- Competitors: 18 from 9 nations

Medalists
gold medal	Ma Yanan; Sun Mengya	China
silver medal	Dilnoza Rakhmatova; Nilufar Zokirova	Uzbekistan
bronze medal	Riska Andriyani; Nurmeni	Indonesia

The women's sprint C-2 (canoe double) 500 metres competition at the 2018 Asian Games was held on 30 August 2018.

== Schedule ==
All times are Western Indonesia Time (UTC+07:00)

Date	Time	Event
Thursday, 30 August 2018	08:30	Final

== Results ==
Rank	Team	Time
1st place, gold medalist(s)	China (CHN); Ma Yanan; Sun Mengya	2:02.512
2nd place, silver medalist(s)	Uzbekistan (UZB); Dilnoza Rakhmatova; Nilufar Zokirova	2:06.160
3rd place, bronze medalist(s)	Indonesia (INA); Riska Andriyani; Nurmeni	2:07.356
4	Japan (JPN); Manaka Kubota; Teruko Kiriake	2:09.400
5	North Korea (PRK); O Un-ha; O Su-rim	2:09.642
6	Vietnam (VIE); Trương Thị Phương; Nguyễn Thị Ngân	2:10.010
7	Iran (IRI); Fatemeh Karamjani; Atena Raoufi	2:10.408
8	India (IND); Inaocha Devi; Anjali Bashishth	2:18.924
9	Thailand (THA); Thanyalak Aoenthachai; Kunyatad Boonma	2:21.430
