= Canoeing at the 2019 Pan American Games – Women's C-2 500 metres =

Women's C-2 500 metres at the 2019 Pan American Games
- Venue: Albufera Medio Mundo
- Dates: July 29
- Competitors: 12 from 6 nations
- Winning time: 1:56.661

Medalists
Gold medal	Mayvihanet Borges; Katherin Nuevo	Cuba
Silver medal	Karen Roco; María Mailliard	Chile
Bronze medal	Anne Lavoie-Parent; Rowan Hardy-Kavanagh	Canada

The Women's C-2 500 metres kayaking event at the 2019 Pan American Games was held on 29 July at the Albufera Medio Mundo in the city of Huacho.

== Results ==
=== Final ===
Rank	Athletes	Country	Time
1st place, gold medalist(s)	Mayvihanet Borges; Katherin Nuevo	Cuba	1:56.661
2nd place, silver medalist(s)	Karen Roco; María Mailliard	Chile	1:59.158
3rd place, bronze medalist(s)	Anne Lavoie-Parent; Rowan Hardy-Kavanagh	Canada	2:02.216
4	Angela Silva; Andrea Santos	Brazil	2:08.178
5	Stephanie Rodríguez; Ada González	Mexico	2:10.071
6	Ana Ochoa; Manuela Gómez	Colombia	2:12.548
