= Chile at the 2020 Summer Olympics =

- IOC code: CHI
- NOC: Chilean Olympic Committee
- Website: www.coch.cl (in Spanish)

in Tokyo, Japan July 23, 2021 – August 8, 2021
- Competitors: 58 in 24 sports
- Flag bearers (opening): Francisca Crovetto; Marco Grimalt
- Flag bearer (closing): María Mailliard
- Medals: Gold 0 Silver 0 Bronze 0 Total 0

Summer Olympics appearances (overview)
- 1896; 1900–1908; 1912; 1920; 1924; 1928; 1932; 1936; 1948; 1952; 1956; 1960; 1964; 1968; 1972; 1976; 1980; 1984; 1988; 1992; 1996; 2000; 2004; 2008; 2012; 2016; 2020; 2024

Chile competed at the 2020 Summer Olympics in Tokyo. Originally scheduled to take place from 24 July to 9 August 2020, the Games were postponed to 23 July to 8 August 2021, because of the COVID-19 pandemic. Since the nation's debut in 1896, Chilean athletes have appeared in all but five editions of the Summer Olympics of the modern era. Chile did not attend the 1932 Summer Olympics in Los Angeles at the period of the worldwide Great Depression and was also part of the US-led boycott, when Moscow hosted the 1980 Summer Olympics.

Chile failed to win any Olympic medals in Tokyo, the third consecutive Olympic Games it has failed to do so.

== Competitors ==
The following is the list of number of competitors participating in the Games:

Sport	Men	Women	Total
Archery	1	0	1
Athletics	2	1	3
Canoeing	0	2	2
Cycling	1	2	3
Equestrian	1	1	2
Fencing	0	1	1
Football	0	22	22
Golf	2	0	2
Gymnastics	1	1	2
Judo	0	1	1
Modern pentathlon	1	0	1
Rowing	2	0	2
Sailing	1	0	1
Shooting	0	1	1
Skateboarding	0	1	1
Surfing	1	0	1
Swimming	1	1	2
Table tennis	0	1	1
Taekwondo	0	1	1
Tennis	1	0	1
Triathlon	1	1	2
Volleyball	2	0	2
Weightlifting	1	1	2
Wrestling	1	0	1
Total	20	38	58

== Archery ==
One Chilean archer qualified for the men's individual recurve at the Games by winning the silver medal and obtaining one of three available spots at the 2021 Pan American Championships in Monterrey, Mexico.

Athlete	Event	Ranking round		Round of 64	Round of 32	Round of 16	Quarterfinals	Semifinals	Final / BM	
Athlete	Event	Score	Seed	Opposition Score	Opposition Score	Opposition Score	Opposition Score	Opposition Score	Opposition Score	Rank
Andrés Aguilar	Men's individual	662	18	Wukie (USA); L 1–7	Did not advance					

== Athletics ==
Chilean athletes further achieved the entry standards, either by qualifying time or by world ranking, in the following track and field events (up to a maximum of 3 athletes in each event):

Key

- Note–Ranks given for track events are within the athlete's heat only
- Q = Qualified for the next round
- q = Qualified for the next round as a fastest loser or, in field events, by position without achieving the qualifying target
- NR = National record
- N/A = Round not applicable for the event
- Bye = Athlete not required to compete in round

Field events

Athlete	Event	Qualification		Final	
Athlete	Event	Distance	Position	Distance	Position
Gabriel Kehr	Men's hammer throw	75.60	13	Did not advance	
Humberto Mansilla	Men's hammer throw	74.76	17	Did not advance	
Karen Gallardo	Women's discus throw	55.81	29	Did not advance	

== Canoeing ==
=== Sprint ===
Chilean canoeists qualified two boats in each of the following distances for the Games through the 2019 ICF Canoe Sprint World Championships in Szeged, Hungary.

Athlete	Event	Heats		Quarterfinals		Semifinals		Final	
Athlete	Event	Time	Rank	Time	Rank	Time	Rank	Time	Rank
María Mailliard	Women's C-1 200 m	47.557	4 QF	46.122	2 SF	48.198	5 FB	47.610	10
María Mailliard; Karen Roco	Women's C-2 500 m	2:09.820	6 QF	2:04.969	4 FB	Bye		2:02.698	9

Qualification Legend: FA = Qualify to final (medal); FB = Qualify to final B (non-medal)

== Cycling ==
=== Road ===
Chile entered one rider to compete in the women's Olympic road race, by virtue of her top 100 individual finish (for women) in the UCI World Ranking.

Athlete	Event	Time	Rank
Catalina Soto	Women's road race	Did not finish	

=== Mountain biking ===
Chile entered one mountain biker to compete in the men's cross-country race by finishing in the top two of the under-23 division at the 2019 UCI Mountain Bike World Championships in Mont-Sainte-Anne, Canada.

Athlete	Event	Time	Rank
Martín Vidaurre	Men's cross-country	1:28:33	16

=== BMX ===
Chile entered one BMX rider to compete in the women's freestyle, by finishing in the top two at the 2019 UCI Urban Cycling World Championships in Chengdu, China.

Athlete	Event	Seeding		Final	
Athlete	Event	Points	Rank	Points	Rank
Macarena Perez Grasset	Women's freestyle	67.90	7	73.80	8

== Equestrian ==
Chile entered one equestrian rider into the Olympic competition by finishing among the top fifteen and securing the last of four available slots in the individual jumping at the 2019 Pan American Games in Lima, Peru. Meanwhile, one eventing rider was added to the Chilean roster by finishing in the top two, outside the group selection, of the individual FEI Olympic Rankings for Group E (Central and South America). The eventing quota was later withdrawn.

With Bermuda failing to comply with the minimum eligibility requirements, Chile received an invitation from FEI to send a dressage rider to the Games, as the next highest-ranked eligible nation within the individual FEI Olympic Rankings for Groups D and E (North, Central and South America).

=== Dressage ===
Athlete	Horse	Event	Grand Prix		Grand Prix Freestyle		Overall	
Athlete	Horse	Event	Score	Rank	Technical	Artistic	Score	Rank
Virginia Yarur	Ronaldo	Individual	66.227	46	Did not advance			

Qualification Legend: Q = Qualified for the final; q = Qualified for the final as a lucky loser

=== Jumping ===
Athlete	Horse	Event	Qualification		Final		
Athlete	Horse	Event	Penalties	Rank	Penalties	Time	Rank
Samuel Parot	Dubai	Individual	4	31	Did not advance		

== Fencing ==
Chile entered one fencer into the Olympic competition. Katina Proestakis claimed a spot in the women's foil by winning the final match at the Pan American Zonal Qualifier in San José, Costa Rica.

Athlete	Event	Round of 64	Round of 32	Round of 16	Quarterfinal	Semifinal	Final / BM	
Athlete	Event	Opposition Score	Opposition Score	Opposition Score	Opposition Score	Opposition Score	Opposition Score	Rank
Katina Proestakis	Women's foil	Jelińska (POL); L 12–15	Did not advance					

== Football ==
Summary

Key:

- A.E.T – After extra time.
- P – Match decided by penalty-shootout.

Team	Event	Group stage				Quarterfinal	Semifinal	Final / BM	
Team	Event	Opposition Score	Opposition Score	Opposition Score	Rank	Opposition Score	Opposition Score	Opposition Score	Rank
Chile women's	Women's tournament	Great Britain; L 0–2	Canada; L 1–2	Japan; L 0–1	4	Did not advance			

=== Women's tournament ===
Chile women's football team qualified for the first time at the Olympics by winning the CAF–CONMEBOL playoff against Cameroon.

Team roster

The final squad of 22 athletes was announced on 2 July 2021.

Head coach: José Letelier

No.	Pos.	Player	Date of birth (age)	Caps	Goals	Club
1	GK	Christiane Endler (captain)	23 July 1991 (aged 29)	80	0	(French Football Federation) Paris Saint-Germain
2	MF	Yastin Jiménez	17 October 2000 (aged 20)	2	0	(Football Federation of Chile) Colo-Colo
3	DF	Carla Guerrero	23 December 1987 (aged 33)	71	5	(Football Federation of Chile) Universidad de Chile
4	DF	Francisca Lara	29 July 1990 (aged 30)	71	20	(French Football Federation) Le Havre
5	DF	Fernanda Ramírez	30 August 1992 (aged 28)	1	0	(Football Federation of Chile) Universidad de Chile
6	DF	Nayadet López	5 August 1994 (aged 26)	4	0	(Royal Spanish Football Federation) Santa Teresa
7	FW	Yenny Acuña	18 May 1997 (aged 24)	3	0	(Football Federation of Chile) Santiago Morning
8	MF	Karen Araya	16 October 1990 (aged 30)	67	7	(Football Federation of Chile) Santiago Morning
9	FW	María José Urrutia	17 December 1993 (aged 27)	22	2	(Football Federation of Chile) Colo-Colo
10	FW	Yanara Aedo	5 August 1993 (aged 27)	70	10	(Royal Spanish Football Federation) Rayo Vallecano
11	MF	Yessenia López	20 October 1990 (aged 30)	40	5	(Football Federation of Chile) Universidad de Chile
12	GK	Natalia Campos	12 January 1992 (aged 29)	9	0	(Football Federation of Chile) Universidad de Chile
13	DF	Fernanda Pinilla	6 November 1993 (aged 27)	19	0	(Football Federation of Chile) Universidad de Chile
14	MF	Daniela Pardo	9 May 1988 (aged 33)	35	3	(Football Federation of Chile) Santiago Morning
15	FW	Daniela Zamora	13 November 1990 (aged 30)	51	5	(Swedish Football Association) Djurgårdens IF
16	DF	Rosario Balmaceda	26 March 1999 (aged 22)	17	0	(Football Federation of Chile) Santiago Morning
17	DF	Javiera Toro	22 April 1998 (aged 23)	17	0	(Royal Spanish Football Federation) Sevilla
18	DF	Camila Sáez	17 October 1994 (aged 26)	62	8	(Royal Spanish Football Federation) Rayo Vallecano
19	FW	Javiera Grez	11 July 2000 (aged 21)	14	2	(Football Federation of Chile) Colo-Colo
20	MF	Francisca Mardones	24 March 1989 (aged 32)	39	1	(Football Federation of Chile) Santiago Morning
21	DF	Valentina Díaz	30 March 2001 (aged 20)	4	0	(Football Federation of Chile) Colo-Colo
22	GK	Antonia Canales	16 October 2002 (aged 18)	0	0	(Football Federation of Chile) Universidad Católica

Group play

Pos	Team	Pld	W	D	L	GF	GA	GD	Pts	Qualification
1	Great Britain	3	2	1	0	4	1	+3	7	Advance to knockout stage
2	Canada	3	1	2	0	4	3	+1	5	Advance to knockout stage
3	Japan (H)	3	1	1	1	2	2	0	4	Advance to knockout stage
4	Chile	3	0	0	3	1	5	−4	0	

Source: TOCOG and FIFA
Rules for classification: Group stage tiebreakers
(H) Hosts
21 July 2021
16:30

Great Britain	2–0	Chile
White 18', 73'	Report (TOCOG); Report (FIFA)

Sapporo Dome, Sapporo
Attendance: 0
Referee: Salima Mukansanga (Rwanda)

24 July 2021
16:30

Chile	1–2	Canada
Araya 57' (pen.)	Report (TOCOG); Report (FIFA)	Beckie 39', 47'

Sapporo Dome, Sapporo
Attendance: 0
Referee: Esther Staubli (Switzerland)

27 July 2021
20:00

Chile	0–1	Japan
	Report (TOCOG); Report (FIFA)	Tanaka 77'

Miyagi Stadium, Rifu
Attendance: 1,326
Referee: Melissa Borjas (Honduras)

== Golf ==
Chile entered two male golfers into the Olympic tournament. Joaquín Niemann (world no. 31) and Mito Pereira (world no. 146) qualified directly among the top 60 eligible players for the men's event based on the IGF World Rankings.

Athlete	Event	Round 1	Round 2	Round 3	Round 4	Total		
Athlete	Event	Score	Score	Score	Score	Score	Par	Rank
Joaquín Niemann	Men's	70	69	66	65	270	−14	=10
Mito Pereira	Men's	69	65	68	67	269	−11	=4

== Gymnastics ==
=== Artistic ===
Chile entered two artistic gymnast into the Olympic competition. Set to compete at her third straight Games, Simona Castro received a spare berth from the women's apparatus events, as one of the twelve highest-ranked gymnasts, neither part of the team nor qualified directly through the all-around, at the 2019 World Championships in Stuttgart, Germany.

Men

Athlete	Event	Qualification								Final							
Athlete	Event	Apparatus						Total	Rank	Apparatus						Total	Rank
Athlete	Event	F	PH	R	V	PB	HB	Total	Rank	F	PH	R	V	PB	HB	Total	Rank
Tomás González	Floor	13.600	—N/a					13.600	42	Did not advance							

Women

Athlete	Event	Qualification						Final					
Athlete	Event	Apparatus				Total	Rank	Apparatus				Total	Rank
Athlete	Event	V	UB	BB	F	Total	Rank	V	UB	BB	F	Total	Rank
Simona Castro	All-around	13.200	11.533	11.433	10.233	46.399	75	Did not advance					

== Judo ==
Chile qualified one judoka for the women's extra-lightweight category (48 kg) at the Games. Mary Dee Vargas accepted a continental berth from the Americas as the nation's top-ranked judoka outside of direct qualifying position in the IJF World Ranking List of June 28, 2021.

Athlete	Event	Round of 32	Round of 16	Quarterfinals	Semifinals	Repechage	Final / BM	
Athlete	Event	Opposition Result	Opposition Result	Opposition Result	Opposition Result	Opposition Result	Opposition Result	Rank
Mary Dee Vargas	Women's –48 kg	Menz (GER); W 01–00	Mönkhbatyn (MGL); L 00–10	Did not advance				

== Modern pentathlon ==
Chilean athletes qualified for the following spots to compete in modern pentathlon. London 2012 Olympian Esteban Bustos secured a selection in men's event by winning the silver medal and finishing among the top two for Latin America at the 2019 Pan American Games in Lima.

Athlete	Event	Fencing (épée one touch)				Swimming (200 m freestyle)			Riding (show jumping)			Combined: shooting/running (10 m air pistol)/(3200 m)			Total points	Final rank
Athlete	Event	RR	BR	Rank	MP points	Time	Rank	MP points	Penalties	Rank	MP points	Time	Rank	MP points	Total points	Final rank
Esteban Bustos	Men's	18–17	0	17	208	2:05.24	26	300	EL	33	0	11:52.66	30	588	1096	34

== Rowing ==
Chile qualified one boat in the men's lightweight double sculls for the Games by winning the silver medal and securing the first of three berths available at the 2021 FISA Americas Olympic Qualification Regatta in Rio de Janeiro, Brazil.

Athlete	Event	Heats		Repechage		Semifinals		Final	
Athlete	Event	Time	Rank	Time	Rank	Time	Rank	Time	Rank
César Abaroa; Eber Sanhueza	Men's lightweight double sculls	6:53.15	5 R	6:48.22	5 FC	Bye		6:31.97	14

Qualification Legend: FA=Final A (medal); FB=Final B (non-medal); FC=Final C (non-medal); FD=Final D (non-medal); FE=Final E (non-medal); FF=Final F (non-medal); SA/B=Semifinals A/B; SC/D=Semifinals C/D; SE/F=Semifinals E/F; QF=Quarterfinals; R=Repechage

== Sailing ==
Chilean sailors qualified one boat in each of the following classes through the class-associated World Championships, and the continental regattas.

Athlete	Event	Race											Net points	Final rank
Athlete	Event	1	2	3	4	5	6	7	8	9	10	M*	Net points	Final rank
Clemente Seguel	Men's Laser	25	5	16	27	11	20	21	22	18	~~31~~	EL	165	22

M = Medal race; EL = Eliminated – did not advance into the medal race

== Shooting ==
Chilean shooters achieved quota places for the following events by virtue of their best finishes at the 2018 ISSF World Championships, the 2019 ISSF World Cup series, the 2019 Pan American Games, and Championships of the Americas, as long as they obtained a minimum qualifying score (MQS) by 31 May 2020.

Athlete	Event	Qualification		Final	
Athlete	Event	Points	Rank	Points	Rank
Francisca Crovetto	Women's skeet	112	23	Did not advance	

== Skateboarding ==
Chile entered one skateboarder to compete in the women's park at the Games. With the cancellation of the 2021 World Park Championships, Josefina Varas accepted an invitation from the World Skate, as one of the top-four skateboarders outside the World Rankings of June 30, 2021.

Athlete	Event	Qualification		Final	
Athlete	Event	Opposition Result	Rank	Opposition Result	Rank
Josefina Tapia Varas	Women's park	9.73	19	Did not advance	

== Surfing ==
Chile sent one surfer to compete in the men's shortboard race at the Games. Manuel Selman finished among the top two of his preliminary heat to secure one of the five available places at the 2021 ISA World Surfing Games in El Sunzal and La Bocana, El Salvador.

Athlete	Event	Round 1		Round 2		Round 3	Quarterfinal	Semifinal	Final / BM	
Athlete	Event	Points	Rank	Points	Rank	Opposition Result	Opposition Result	Opposition Result	Opposition Result	Rank
Manuel Selman	Men's shortboard	6.20	4 q	9.74	4	Did not advance				

== Swimming ==
Chilean swimmers further achieved qualifying standards in the following events (up to a maximum of 2 swimmers in each event at the Olympic Qualifying Time (OQT), and potentially 1 at the Olympic Selection Time (OST)):

Athlete	Event	Heat		Final	
Athlete	Event	Time	Rank	Time	Rank
Eduardo Cisternas	Men's 400 m freestyle	3:54.10	27	Did not advance	
Kristel Köbrich	Women's 800 m freestyle	8:32.58	19	Did not advance	
Kristel Köbrich	Women's 1500 m freestyle	16:09.09	14	Did not advance	

== Table tennis ==
Chile entered one athlete into the table tennis competition at the Games for the first time since London 2012. Making her Olympic comeback after her debut in Athens 2004, María Paulina Vega scored the initial-stage final match triumph to book one of the available places in the women's singles at the Latin American Qualification Tournament in Rosario, Argentina.

Athlete	Event	Preliminary	Round 1	Round 2	Round 3	Round of 16	Quarterfinals	Semifinals	Final / BM	
Athlete	Event	Opposition Result	Opposition Result	Opposition Result	Opposition Result	Opposition Result	Opposition Result	Opposition Result	Opposition Result	Rank
María Paulina Vega	Women's singles	Bye	Batmönkh (MGL); W 4–0	Sawettabut (THA); L 0–4	Did not advance					

== Taekwondo ==
Chile entered one athlete into the taekwondo competition at the Games. 2019 Pan American Games bronze medalist Fernanda Aguirre secured a spot in the women's lightweight category (57 kg) with a top two finish at the 2020 Pan American Qualification Tournament in San José, Costa Rica. However, Aguirre was forced to withdraw from the Games after testing positive for COVID-19.

Athlete	Event	Round of 16	Quarterfinals	Semifinals	Repechage	Final / BM	
Athlete	Event	Opposition Result	Opposition Result	Opposition Result	Opposition Result	Opposition Result	Rank
Fernanda Aguirre	Women's −57 kg	Withdrew due to positive COVID-19 test					

== Tennis ==
Chile entered one tennis players into the Olympic tournament. Tomás Barrios secured an outright berth in the men's singles by advancing to the final match at the 2019 Pan American Games in Lima.

Athlete	Event	Round of 64	Round of 32	Round of 16	Quarterfinals	Semifinals	Final / BM	
Athlete	Event	Opposition Result	Opposition Result	Opposition Result	Opposition Result	Opposition Result	Opposition Result	Rank
Tomás Barrios	Men's singles	Chardy (FRA); L 1–6, 6–7^{(4–7)}	Did not advance					

== Triathlon ==
Chile entered two triathletes (one per gender) to compete at the Olympics. Remarkably going to her fourth straight Games, Bárbara Riveros was selected among the top 26 triathletes vying for qualification in the women's event based on the individual ITU World Rankings of 15 June 2021, with rookie Diego Moya topping the field of triathletes from the Americas on the men's side.

Athlete	Event	Time						Rank
Athlete	Event	Swim (1.5 km)	Trans 1	Bike (40 km)	Trans 2	Run (10 km)	Total	Rank
Diego Moya	Men's	17:50	0:42	56:34	0:35	32:48	1:48:29	30
Bárbara Riveros	Women's	19:45	0:42	1:04:54	0:36	36:49	2:02:46	25

== Volleyball ==
=== Beach ===
Chile men's beach volleyball pair qualified directly for the Olympics by virtue of their nation's top 15 placement in the FIVB Olympic Rankings of 13 June 2021.

Athlete	Event	Preliminary round				Repechage	Round of 16	Quarterfinal	Semifinal	Final / BM	
Athlete	Event	Opposition Score	Opposition Score	Opposition Score	Rank	Opposition Score	Opposition Score	Opposition Score	Opposition Score	Opposition Score	Rank
Esteban Grimalt; Marco Grimalt	Men's	Evandro / Schmidt (BRA); L (15–21, 21–16, 12–15)	Bryl / Fijałek (POL); L (17–21, 18–21)	Abicha / El Graoui (MAR); W (21–14, 21–12)	3 R	Gerson / Heidrich (SUI); W (21–17, 21–18)	Leshukov / Semenov (ROC); L (16–21, 16–21)	Did not advance			

== Weightlifting ==
Chile entered two weightlifters (one per gender) into the Olympic competition. Two-time Olympian María Fernanda Valdés finished sixth of the eight highest-ranked weightlifters in the women's 87 kg category based on the IWF Absolute World Rankings, with rookie Arley Méndez topping the field of weightlifters from the American zone in the men's 81 kg category based on the IWF Absolute Continental Rankings.

Athlete	Event	Snatch		Clean & jerk		Total	Rank
Athlete	Event	Result	Rank	Result	Rank	Total	Rank
Arley Méndez	Men's –81 kg	160	8	~~190~~	DNF	160	DNF
María Fernanda Valdés	Women's –87 kg	Withdrew due to injury					

== Wrestling ==
Chile qualified one wrestler for the men's Greco-Roman 130 kg into the Olympic competition, by progressing to the top two finals at the 2020 Pan American Qualification Tournament in Ottawa, Canada.

Key:

- VT (ranking points: 5–0 or 0–5) – Victory by fall.
- VB (ranking points: 5–0 or 0–5) – Victory by injury (VF for forfeit, VA for withdrawal or disqualification)
- PP (ranking points: 3–1 or 1–3) – Decision by points – the loser with technical points.
- PO (ranking points: 3–0 or 0–3) – Decision by points – the loser without technical points.
- ST (ranking points: 4–0 or 0–4) – Great superiority – the loser without technical points and a margin of victory of at least 8 (Greco-Roman) or 10 (freestyle) points.
- SP (ranking points: 4–1 or 1–4) – Technical superiority – the loser with technical points and a margin of victory of at least 8 (Greco-Roman) or 10 (freestyle) points.

Greco-Roman

Athlete	Event	Round of 16	Quarterfinal	Semifinal	Repechage	Final / BM	
Athlete	Event	Opposition Result	Opposition Result	Opposition Result	Opposition Result	Opposition Result	Rank
Yasmani Acosta	Men's −130 kg	Guennichi (TUN); W 3–1 ^{PP}	Abdullaev (UZB); W 3–0 ^{PO}	Kajaia (GEO); L 1–3 ^{PP}	Bye	Semenov (ROC); L 1–3 ^{PP}	5

== See also ==
- Chile at the 2019 Pan American Games
- Chile at the 2020 Summer Paralympics
