= Canoeing at the 2022 Asian Games – Women's C-2 200 metres =

Women's C-2 200 metres at the 2022 Asian Games
- Venue: Fuyang Water Sports Centre
- Date: 3 October 2023
- Competitors: 16 from 8 nations

Medalists
gold medal	Shuai Changwen; Lin Wenjun	China
silver medal	Margarita Torlopova; Ulyana Kisseleva	Kazakhstan
bronze medal	Shokhsanam Sherzodova; Nilufar Zokirova	Uzbekistan

The women's sprint C-2 (canoe double) 200 metres competition at the 2022 Asian Games was held on 3 October 2023.

== Schedule ==
All times are China Standard Time (UTC+08:00)

Date	Time	Event
Tuesday, 3 October 2023	12:00	Final

== Results ==
Rank	Team	Time
1st place, gold medalist(s)	China (CHN); Shuai Changwen; Lin Wenjun	44.296
2nd place, silver medalist(s)	Kazakhstan (KAZ); Margarita Torlopova; Ulyana Kisseleva	46.627
3rd place, bronze medalist(s)	Uzbekistan (UZB); Shokhsanam Sherzodova; Nilufar Zokirova	47.029
4	Indonesia (INA); Nurmeni; Riska Andriyani	48.347
5	Iran (IRI); Hedieh Kheirabadi; Hiva Afzali	48.850
6	Thailand (THA); Kewalin Takhianram; Aphinya Sroichit	50.268
7	Vietnam (VIE); Ma Thị Thương; Diệp Thị Hương	50.362
8	India (IND); Kaveri Dimar; Neha Devi Leichonbam	51.479
