= Canoeing at the 2018 Asian Games – Women's K-1 500 metres =

Women's K-1 500 metres at the 2018 Asian Games
- Venue: Jakabaring Lake
- Date: 30 August 2018
- Competitors: 8 from 8 nations

Medalists
gold medal	Li Yue	China
silver medal	Hedieh Kazemi	Iran
bronze medal	Lee Sun-ja	South Korea

The women's sprint K-1 (kayak single) 500 metres competition at the 2018 Asian Games was held on 30 August 2018.

== Schedule ==
All times are Western Indonesia Time (UTC+07:00)

Date	Time	Event
Thursday, 30 August 2018	08:50	Final

== Results ==
Rank	Athlete	Time
1st place, gold medalist(s)	Li Yue (CHN)	1:59.468
2nd place, silver medalist(s)	Hedieh Kazemi (IRI)	2:02.280
3rd place, bronze medalist(s)	Lee Sun-ja (KOR)	2:02.532
4	Yuka Ono (JPN)	2:03.206
5	Stevani Maysche Ibo (INA)	2:04.202
6	Anastassiya Berezovskaya (KAZ)	2:04.836
7	Deborah Saw (SGP)	2:13.248
8	Soniya Devi Phairembam (IND)	2:20.606
