= Canoeing at the 2018 Asian Games – Women's C-1 200 metres =

Women's C-1 200 metres at the 2018 Asian Games
- Venue: Jakabaring Lake
- Date: 31 August – 1 September 2018
- Competitors: 12 from 12 nations

Medalists
gold medal	Sun Mengya	China
silver medal	Riska Andriyani	Indonesia
bronze medal	Dilnoza Rakhmatova	Uzbekistan

The women's sprint C-1 (canoe single) 200 metres competition at the 2018 Asian Games was held from 31 August to 1 September 2018.

== Schedule ==
All times are Western Indonesia Time (UTC+07:00)

Date	Time	Event
Friday, 31 August 2018	09:00	Heats
Friday, 31 August 2018	16:00	Semifinal
Saturday, 1 September 2018	08:40	Final

== Results ==
Legend

- DNF — Did not finish

=== Heats ===
- Qualification: 1–3 → Final (QF), Rest → Semifinal (QS)

==== Heat 1 ====
Rank	Athlete	Time	Notes
1	Dilnoza Rakhmatova (UZB)	50.860	QF
2	Trương Thị Phương (VIE)	52.806	QF
3	Svetlana Ussova (KAZ)	52.918	QF
3	Orasa Thiangkathok (THA)	52.918	QF
5	Megumi Tsubota (JPN)	54.278	QS
6	Louisa Cheong (MAC)	1:01.268	QS

==== Heat 2 ====
Rank	Athlete	Time	Notes
1	Riska Andriyani (INA)	50.461	QF
2	Ko Haeng-bok (PRK)	51.145	QF
3	Sun Mengya (CHN)	51.309	QF
4	Lim Yuan Yin (SGP)	55.571	QS
5	Kim Yeo-jin (KOR)	1:01.185	QS
—	Meera Das (IND)	DNF	

=== Semifinal ===
- Qualification: 1–2 → Final (QF)

Rank	Athlete	Time	Notes
1	Megumi Tsubota (JPN)	50.758	QF
2	Lim Yuan Yin (SGP)	51.593	QF
3	Louisa Cheong (MAC)	56.166	
4	Kim Yeo-jin (KOR)	57.874	

=== Final ===
Rank	Athlete	Time
1st place, gold medalist(s)	Sun Mengya (CHN)	49.070
2nd place, silver medalist(s)	Riska Andriyani (INA)	49.086
3rd place, bronze medalist(s)	Dilnoza Rakhmatova (UZB)	49.282
4	Ko Haeng-bok (PRK)	49.305
5	Trương Thị Phương (VIE)	51.409
6	Svetlana Ussova (KAZ)	51.442
7	Orasa Thiangkathok (THA)	51.559
8	Lim Yuan Yin (SGP)	52.745
9	Megumi Tsubota (JPN)	53.520
