= Manaka Kubota =

Japanese sprint canoer

Personal information
- Nationality: Japanese
- Born: 9 July 1996 (age 29) Tokyo, Japan

Sport
- Sport: Sprint Canoe

Manaka Kubota (born 9 July 1996) is a Japanese sprint canoer who competed at the 2020 Olympics in the C-2 500 metres sprint event alongside Teruko Kiriake, and in the C-1 200 metres.
