= Canoeing at the 2018 Asian Games – Women's K-2 500 metres =

Sprint canoeing competition

Women's K-2 500 metres at the 2018 Asian Games
- Venue: Jakabaring Lake
- Date: 1 September 2018
- Competitors: 14 from 7 nations

Medalists
gold medal	Li Yue; Zhou Yu	China
silver medal	Ekaterina Shubina; Yuliya Borzova	Uzbekistan
bronze medal	Yuka Ono; Hideka Tatara	Japan

The women's sprint K-2 (kayak double) 500 metres competition at the 2018 Asian Games was held on 1 September 2018.

== Schedule ==
All times are Western Indonesia Time (UTC+07:00)

Date	Time	Event
Saturday, 1 September 2018	10:00	Final

== Results ==
Rank	Team	Time
1st place, gold medalist(s)	China (CHN); Li Yue; Zhou Yu	1:45.266
2nd place, silver medalist(s)	Uzbekistan (UZB); Ekaterina Shubina; Yuliya Borzova	1:48.012
3rd place, bronze medalist(s)	Japan (JPN); Yuka Ono; Hideka Tatara	1:49.143
4	Kazakhstan (KAZ); Zoya Ananchenko; Irina Podoinikova	1:49.529
5	Iran (IRI); Hedieh Kazemi; Arezoo Hakimi	1:51.655
6	Singapore (SGP); Sarah Chen; Geraldine Lee	1:54.609
7	Chinese Taipei (TPE); Tsai Liang-yu; Hsieh Ming-juan	2:01.973
