= Svetlana Ussova =

Kazakh canoeist

Personal information
- Native name: Светлана Игоревна Усова
- Full name: Svetlana Igorevna Usova
- Born: 4 November 1999 (age 26) Almaty, Kazakhstan
- Height: 1.65 m (5 ft 5 in)

Sport
- Country: Kazakhstan
- Sport: Canoeing
- Event: Women's C-1 200 metres

Svetlana Ussova (Светлана Усова, born 4 November 1999) is a Kazakh canoeist. She competed for Kazakhstan at the 2020 Summer Olympics in the women's C-2 500 metres with Margarita Torlopova.

Ussova also represented Kazakhstan at the 2018 Asian Games in the women's C-1 200 metres.
