= Daryna Pikuleva =

Belarusian sprint canoeist

Personal information
- Nationality: Belarusian
- Born: 29 August 1996 (age 29) Homel, Belarus
- Height: 170 cm (5 ft 7 in)
- Weight: 64 kg (141 lb)

Sport
- Country: Belarus
- Sport: Canoe sprint
- Event: Canoeing

Daryna Pikuleva (Belarusian: Дарына Пікулева; born 29 August 1996) is a Belarusian sprint canoeist. She qualified in the women's K-4 500 metres events at the 2020 Summer Olympics.
