= Sun Mengya =

Chinese canoeist (born 2001)

Personal information
- Nationality: Chinese
- Born: 3 May 2001 (age 25) Zaozhuang, Shandong, China
- Height: 1.72 m (5 ft 8 in) (2022)

Sport
- Country: China
- Sport: Sprint canoe
- Event: C–2 500 m
Medal record
Women's canoe sprint
Representing China
Olympic Games
Gold medal – first place	2020 Tokyo	C-2 500 m
Gold medal – first place	2024 Paris	C-2 500 m
World Championships
Gold medal – first place	2019 Szeged	C-2 500 m
Gold medal – first place	2022 Dartmouth	C-2 500 m
Gold medal – first place	2023 Duisburg	C-2 500 m
Gold medal – first place	2026 Poznań	C-4 500 m
Bronze medal – third place	2025 Milan	C-4 500 m
Asian Games
Gold medal – first place	2018 Jakarta-Palembang	C-1 200 m
Gold medal – first place	2018 Jakarta-Palembang	C-2 500 m
Gold medal – first place	2022 Hangzhou	C-2 500 m
Gold medal – first place	2026 Aichi–Nagoya	C-2 500 m
Asian Championships
Gold medal – first place	2025 Nanchang	C-1 200 m
Gold medal – first place	2025 Nanchang	C-2 500 m

Sun Mengya (simplified Chinese: 孙梦雅; traditional Chinese: 孫夢雅; pinyin: Sūn Mèngyǎ; born 3 May 2001) is a Chinese sprint canoeist. She won the gold medal with her teammate Xu Shixiao in women's C-2 500 metres at 2020 Summer Olympics in Tokyo and 2024 Summer Olympics in Paris.

Born in Taierzhuang District, Zaozhuang City, Shandong Province, he is a Chinese kayaker who plays for the Shandong team. In 2015, Sun Mengya, who was only 14 years old, was selected into the kayaking team of Zaozhuang Sports School.

== Career ==
In 2016, Sun Mengya won the championship in the women's 200-meter singles rowing event at the Shandong Provincial Canoeing Championships.

In 2017, Sun Mengya and her teammates won the championship in the women's 500-meter double rowing event at the Asian Flat Water Canoe Championships. In the same year, Sun Mengya won the championship in the women's 200-meter single rowing event at the Canoe Open (Linyi Station); in the 500-meter single rowing event, Sun Mengya won second place. In June, Sun Mengya won third placer in the 200-meter single rowing event at the 13th National Games and was selected into the national team after the National Games.

On March 27, 2018, Sun Mengya won the silver medal in the women's 200-meter single rowing event at the National Canoe Flat Water Spring Championships. On May 16, Sun Mengya and teammate Ma Yanan won the championship in the double rowing 200-meter and 500-meter events of the 7th Women's Rowing World Cup. In the 500-meter single rowing event, Sun Mengya won the championship. On May 27, in the women's double rowing 500-meter event at the German Canoe World Cup, Sun Mengya and her teammate Ma Yanan won the runner-up; in the women's single rowing 500-meter event, Sun Mengya won the third place. On August 6, Sun Mengya was selected into the Chinese sports delegation for the 18th Asian Games. On August 30, in the women's 500-meter double canoe final of the Jakarta Asian Games, Sun Mengya and teammate Ma Yanan won the championship. On August 31, in the women's single 200-meter canoeing event at the Jakarta Asian Games, Sun Mengya finished third with a time of 51.309 seconds. On September 1, in the women's single 200-meter canoe final of the canoe flat water competition at the 2018 Jakarta Asian Games, Sun Mengya won the championship with a time of 49.070 seconds.

She won a medal at the 2019 ICF Canoe Sprint World Championships.

She qualified for the 2020 Summer Olympics, where she and her partner Xu Shixiao won the gold medal in women's C-2 500 metres in the event's debut on the Olympic stage, which replaced the men's K-2 200 metres as the Olympics moves toward gender equality.

On April 6, 2021, in the women's 500-meter double rowing group A competition of the 2021 National Canoe Flat Water Spring Championships, Sun Mengya and teammate Xu Shixiao won the championship with a time of 1 minute, 52 seconds and 772 seconds.

On August 6, local time, the 2022 Canoeing (Standwater) World Championships continued in Halifax, Canada. In the women's double rowing 500m Group A final, the Tokyo Olympics gold medal team Sun Mengya/Xu Shixiao won the Olympic Games On the first anniversary of the championship, he won another world championship. This is the second time the two won the World Championships gold medal after 2019.

In July 2023, at the 2023 National Canoe Flatwater Championships, Xu Shixiao/Sun Mengya won the second place in the women's 200-meter double rowing, and Xu Shixiao/Sun Mengya won the first place in the women's 500-meter double rowing.

== Social activity ==
On October 18, 2021, Sun Mengya participated in the "Shared Mission, Together with Glory" held in Jinan - China Glory Athletes Hongqi H9 Shandong Regional Delivery Ceremony and received a Hongqi H9 car after watching the Hongqi 70-year VCR video Accept the new era C+ class luxury flagship sedan Hongqi H9 car model.

In December 2021, the song "See You in Beijing" in which Sun Mengya participated in the performance was officially released.
