= Kasai Canoe Slalom Centre =

White water sports venue in Tokyo, Japan

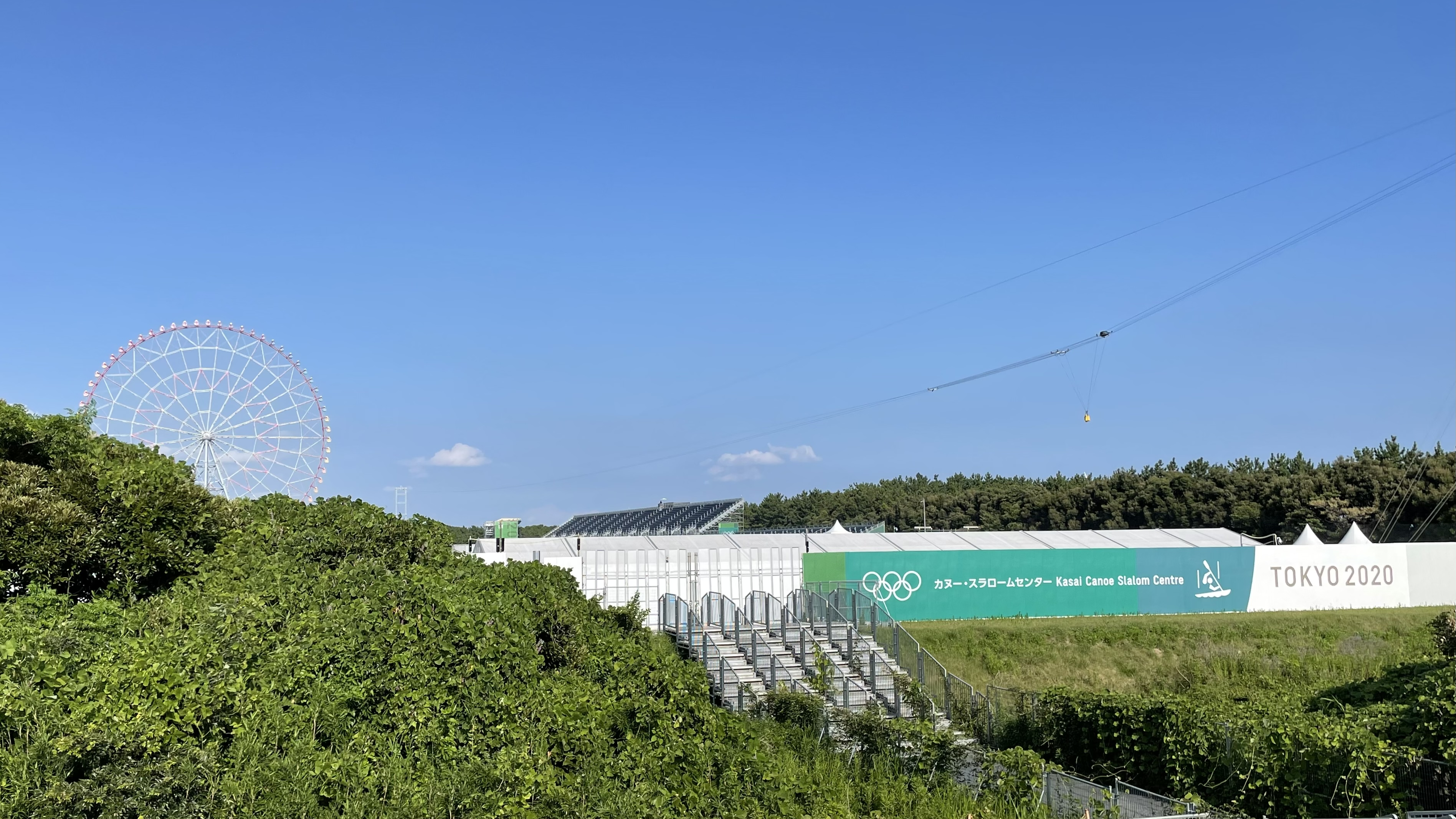

About
- Locale: Edogawa, Tokyo, Japan
- Coordinates: 35.64352085°N 139.85526972437347°E
- Main shape: Two Loops
- Pumped: Olympic: 4 pumps Training: 3 pumps
- Practice pool: Yes
- Lighting: Yes
- Canoe lift: Yes
- Opening date: 6 July 2019

Stats
- Length: 200 m (660 ft)
- Drop: 4.5 m (15 ft)
- Flowrate: 12 m^{3}/s (420 cu ft/s)

The Kasai Canoe Slalom Centre is a whitewater paddling venue, constructed to host the canoeing slalom events for the 2020 Summer Olympics in Tokyo. It is first artificial slalom course in Japan. The total construction cost of this venue was around 7 billion yen (about $64 million) and it has the capacity 7,500 spectators.
