= Canoeing at the 2018 Asian Games – Women's K-1 200 metres =

Women's K-1 200 metres at the 2018 Asian Games
- Venue: Jakabaring Lake
- Date: 31 August – 1 September 2018
- Competitors: 11 from 11 nations

Medalists
gold medal	Inna Klinova	Kazakhstan
silver medal	Li Yue	China
bronze medal	Yuka Ono	Japan

The women's sprint K-1 (kayak single) 200 metres competition at the 2018 Asian Games was held from 31 August to 1 September 2018.

== Schedule ==
All times are Western Indonesia Time (UTC+07:00)

Date	Time	Event
Friday, 31 August 2018	09:20	Heats
Friday, 31 August 2018	16:10	Semifinal
Saturday, 1 September 2018	08:30	Final

== Results ==
Legend

- DNS — Did not start

=== Heats ===
- Qualification: 1–3 → Final (QF), Rest → Semifinal (QS)

==== Heat 1 ====
Rank	Athlete	Time	Notes
1	Kim Guk-joo (KOR)	43.199	QF
2	Li Yue (CHN)	43.449	QF
3	Olga Umaralieva (UZB)	43.575	QF
4	Stephenie Chen (SGP)	43.791	QS
5	Stevani Maysche Ibo (INA)	45.249	QS
6	Ragina Kiro (IND)	51.239	QS

==== Heat 2 ====
Rank	Athlete	Time	Notes
1	Inna Klinova (KAZ)	42.942	QF
2	Yuka Ono (JPN)	44.016	QF
3	Arezoo Hakimi (IRI)	44.170	QF
4	Hsieh Ming-juan (TPE)	47.986	QS
5	Ng Si Cheng (MAC)	1:03.178	QS

=== Semifinal ===
- Qualification: 1–3 → Final (QF)

Rank	Athlete	Time	Notes
1	Stephenie Chen (SGP)	41.513	QF
2	Stevani Maysche Ibo (INA)	41.724	QF
3	Hsieh Ming-juan (TPE)	44.298	QF
4	Ragina Kiro (IND)	47.515	
5	Ng Si Cheng (MAC)	58.933	

=== Final ===
Rank	Athlete	Time
1st place, gold medalist(s)	Inna Klinova (KAZ)	42.045
2nd place, silver medalist(s)	Li Yue (CHN)	42.507
3rd place, bronze medalist(s)	Yuka Ono (JPN)	43.092
4	Stephenie Chen (SGP)	43.162
5	Stevani Maysche Ibo (INA)	43.389
6	Kim Guk-joo (KOR)	43.545
7	Arezoo Hakimi (IRI)	43.594
8	Hsieh Ming-juan (TPE)	46.326
—	Olga Umaralieva (UZB)	DNS
