= Moldova at the 2020 Summer Olympics =

- IOC code: MDA
- NOC: National Olympic Committee of the Republic of Moldova
- Website: www.olympic.md (in Romanian)

in Tokyo, Japan 23 July 2021 – 8 August 2021
- Competitors: 20 in 8 sports
- Flag bearers (opening): Dan Olaru; Alexandra Mîrca
- Flag bearer (closing): Andrian Mardare
- Medals Ranked 86th: Gold 0 Silver 0 Bronze 1 Total 1

Summer Olympics appearances (overview)
- 1996; 2000; 2004; 2008; 2012; 2016; 2020; 2024

Other related appearances
- Russian Empire (1900–1912); Romania (1924–1936); Soviet Union (1952–1988); Unified Team (1992)

Moldova, officially the Republic of Moldova, competed at the 2020 Summer Olympics in Tokyo. Originally scheduled to take place from 24 July to 9 August 2020, the Games were postponed to 23 July to 8 August 2021, because of the COVID-19 pandemic. It was the nation's seventh consecutive appearance at the Summer Olympics in the post-Soviet era.

== Medalists ==
| Medal | Name | Sport | Event | Date |
|---|---|---|---|---|
| Bronze | Serghei Tarnovschi | Canoeing | Men's C-1 1000 m | 7 August |

== Competitors ==
The following is the list of number of competitors in the Games.

| Sport | Men | Women | Total |
|---|---|---|---|
| Archery | 1 | 1 | 2 |
| Athletics | 2 | 4 | 6 |
| Canoeing | 1 | 2 | 3 |
| Judo | 2 | 0 | 2 |
| Shooting | 0 | 1 | 1 |
| Swimming | 1 | 1 | 2 |
| Weightlifting | 1 | 1 | 2 |
| Wrestling | 1 | 1 | 2 |
| Total | 9 | 11 | 20 |

== Archery ==
One Moldovan archer qualified for the women's individual recurve by reaching the quarterfinal stage and obtaining one of the four available spots at the 2019 World Archery Championships in 's-Hertogenbosch, Netherlands. Another Moldovan archer scored a fourth-round triumph to book the last of seven available spots in the men's individual recurve at the 2021 Final Qualification Tournament in Paris, France.

| Athlete | Event | Ranking round | | Round of 64 | Round of 32 | Round of 16 | Quarterfinals | Semifinals | Final / BM | |
| Athlete | Event | Score | Seed | Opposition Score | Opposition Score | Opposition Score | Opposition Score | Opposition Score | Opposition Score | Rank |
|---|---|---|---|---|---|---|---|---|---|---|
| Dan Olaru | Men's individual | 648 | 49 | Duenas (CAN); L 0–6 | Did not advance | | | | | |
| Alexandra Mîrca | Women's individual | 627 | 51 | Yang Xl (CHN); L 0–6 | Did not advance | | | | | |
| Dan Olaru; Alexandra Mîrca | Mixed team | 1275 | 22 | — | | Did not advance | | | | |

== Athletics ==
Moldovan athletes further achieved the entry standards, either by qualifying time or by world ranking, in the following track and field events (up to a maximum of 3 athletes in each event):

Key

- Note–Ranks given for track events are within the athlete's heat only
- Q = Qualified for the next round
- q = Qualified for the next round as a fastest loser or, in field events, by position without achieving the qualifying target
- NR = National record
- N/A = Round not applicable for the event
- Bye = Athlete not required to compete in round

Track & road events

| Athlete | Event | Final | |
| Athlete | Event | Result | Rank |
|---|---|---|---|
| Lilia Fisicovici | Women's marathon | 2:39:59 | 54 |

Field events

| Athlete | Event | Qualification | | Final | |
| Athlete | Event | Distance | Position | Distance | Position |
|---|---|---|---|---|---|
| Andrian Mardare | Men's javelin throw | 82.70 | 10 q | 83.30 | 7 |
| Serghei Marghiev | Men's hammer throw | 75.94 | 10 q | 75.24 | 12 |
| Dimitriana Surdu | Women's shot put | 16.55 | 28 | Did not advance | |
| Alexandra Emilianov | Women's discus throw | 54.57 | 30 | Did not advance | |
| Zalina Petrivskaya | Women's hammer throw | 69.29 | 11 | Did not advance | |

== Canoeing ==
=== Sprint ===
Moldova qualified a boat in the women's C-2 200 m for the Games by topping the field of canoeists in the medal final at the 2021 European Canoe Sprint Qualification Regatta in Szeged, Hungary. Meanwhile, one additional boat was awarded to the Moldovan canoeist in the men's K-1 1000 m with a gold-medal triumph at the 2021 European Canoe Sprint Qualification Regatta.

| Athlete | Event | Heat | | Quarterfinals | | Semifinals | | Final | |
| Athlete | Event | Time | Rank | Time | Rank | Time | Rank | Time | Rank |
|---|---|---|---|---|---|---|---|---|---|
| Serghei Tarnovschi | Men's C-1 1000 m | 4:02.794 | 1 SF | Bye | | 4:06.635 | 2 FA | 4:06.069 | 3rd place, bronze medalist(s) |
| Daniela Cociu | Women's C-1 200 m | 48.338 | 3 QF | 48.594 | 6 | Did not advance | | | |
| Maria Olărașu | Women's C-1 200 m | 50.607 | 7 QF | 49.002 | 7 | Did not advance | | | |
| Daniela Cociu; Maria Olărașu | Women's C-2 500 m | 2:06.070 | 4 QF | 2:03.434 | 2 SF | 2:05.910 | 4 FA | 2:01.750 | 7 |

Qualification Legend: FA = Qualify to final (medal); FB = Qualify to final B (non-medal)

== Judo ==
Moldova entered two male judoka into the Olympic tournament based on the International Judo Federation Olympics Individual Ranking.

| Athlete | Event | Round of 64 | Round of 32 | Round of 16 | Quarterfinals | Semifinals | Repechage | Final / BM | |
| Athlete | Event | Opposition Result | Opposition Result | Opposition Result | Opposition Result | Opposition Result | Opposition Result | Opposition Result | Rank |
|---|---|---|---|---|---|---|---|---|---|
| Denis Vieru | Men's −66 kg | — | Nurillaev (UZB); W 10–00 | Cargnin (BRA); L 00–01 | Did not advance | | | | |
| Victor Sterpu | Men's −73 kg | Bye | Estrada (CUB); W 10–00 | Butbul (ISR); L 00–10 | Did not advance | | | | |

== Shooting ==
| Athlete | Event | Qualification | | Final | |
| Athlete | Event | Points | Rank | Points | Rank |
|---|---|---|---|---|---|
| Anna Dulce | Women's 10 m air pistol | 557 | 48 | Did not advance | |

== Swimming ==
Moldovan swimmers further achieved qualifying standards in the following events (up to a maximum of 2 swimmers in each event at the Olympic Qualifying Time (OQT), and potentially 1 at the Olympic Selection Time (OST)):

| Athlete | Event | Heat | | Semifinal | | Final | |
| Athlete | Event | Time | Rank | Time | Rank | Time | Rank |
|---|---|---|---|---|---|---|---|
| Alexei Sancov | Men's 200 metre freestyle | 1:47.46 | 26 | Did not advance | | | |
| Alexei Sancov | Men's 200 metre butterfly | 1:57.55 | 26 | Did not advance | | | |
| Tatiana Salcuțan | Women's 100 m backstroke | 1:01.59 | 28 | Did not advance | | | |
| Tatiana Salcuțan | Women's 200 m backstroke | 2:09.98 | 11 Q | 2:10.09 | 11 | Did not advance | |

== Weightlifting ==
Moldova entered two weightlifters into the Olympic competition. Elena Cîlcic accepted a spare berth unused by the Tripartite Commission as the next highest-ranked weightlifter vying for qualification in the women's 87 kg category based on the IWF Absolute World Rankings.

| Athlete | Event | Snatch | | Clean & Jerk | | Total | Rank |
| Athlete | Event | Result | Rank | Result | Rank | Total | Rank |
|---|---|---|---|---|---|---|---|
| Marin Robu | Men's –73 kg | 155 | 3 | 175 | 11 | 330 | 8 |
| Elena Cîlcic | Women's −87 kg | 105 | 8 | 135 | 7 | 240 | 8 |

== Wrestling ==
Moldova qualified two wrestlers for each of the following classes into the Olympic competition. One of them finished among the top six to claim an Olympic slot in the women's freestyle 57 kg at the 2019 World Championships, while an additional license was awarded to the Moldovan wrestler, who progressed to the top two finals of the men's Greco-Roman 60 kg at the 2021 World Qualification Tournament in Sofia, Bulgaria.

Key:

- VT (ranking points: 5–0 or 0–5) – Victory by fall.
- VB (ranking points: 5–0 or 0–5) – Victory by injury (VF for forfeit, VA for withdrawal or disqualification)
- PP (ranking points: 3–1 or 1–3) – Decision by points – the loser with technical points.
- PO (ranking points: 3–0 or 0–3) – Decision by points – the loser without technical points.
- ST (ranking points: 4–0 or 0–4) – Great superiority – the loser without technical points and a margin of victory of at least 8 (Greco-Roman) or 10 (freestyle) points.
- SP (ranking points: 4–1 or 1–4) – Technical superiority – the loser with technical points and a margin of victory of at least 8 (Greco-Roman) or 10 (freestyle) points.

Freestyle

| Athlete | Event | Round of 16 | Quarterfinal | Semifinal | Repechage | Final / BM | |
| Athlete | Event | Opposition Result | Opposition Result | Opposition Result | Opposition Result | Opposition Result | Rank |
|---|---|---|---|---|---|---|---|
| Anastasia Nichita | Women's −57 kg | Adekuoroye (NGR); W 5–0 ^{VT} | Nikolova (BUL); L 1–3 ^{PP} | Did not advance | | | 7 |

Greco-Roman

| Athlete | Event | Round of 16 | Quarterfinal | Semifinal | Repechage | Final / BM | |
| Athlete | Event | Opposition Result | Opposition Result | Opposition Result | Opposition Result | Opposition Result | Rank |
|---|---|---|---|---|---|---|---|
| Victor Ciobanu | Men's −60 kg | Kamal (TUR); W 4–0 ^{ST} | Sharshenbekov (KGZ); W 4–0 ^{ST} | Orta (CUB); L 0–4 ^{ST} | Bye | Emelin (ROC); L 1–4 ^{SP} | 5 |
