= Katherin Nuevo =

Cuban sprint canoer (born 2002)

Personal information
- Full name: Katherin Nuevo Segura
- Nationality: Cuban
- Born: 24 October 2002 (age 23)

Sport
- Country: Cuba
- Sport: Canoe sprint
Medal record
Women's canoe sprint
Representing Cuba
World Championships
Gold medal – first place	2022 Dartmouth	C-2 200 m
Silver medal – second place	2021 Copenhagen	C-2 200 m
Bronze medal – third place	2021 Copenhagen	C-2 500 m
Pan American Games
Gold medal – first place	2019 Lima	C-2 500 m

Katherin Nuevo Segura (born 24 October 2002) is a Cuban sprint canoeist.

She qualified at the 2020 Summer Olympics, in the C-1 200 meters, and C-2 500 meters.

She competed at the 2019 ICF Canoe Sprint World Championships. and at the 2021 Canoe Sprint World Cup. At the 2021 ICF Canoe Sprint World Championships, Nuevo and her partner Yarisleidis Cirilo won gold medals in the women's C-2 200m event.

In 2022, Nuevo competed at the ICF Canoe Sprint World Championships in Halifax, Canada, where she and her partner, Yarisleidis Cirilo, qualified for the C2-500 A final after winning their heat, but ultimately came last in the final.
