= Xu Shixiao =

Chinese canoeist (born 1992)

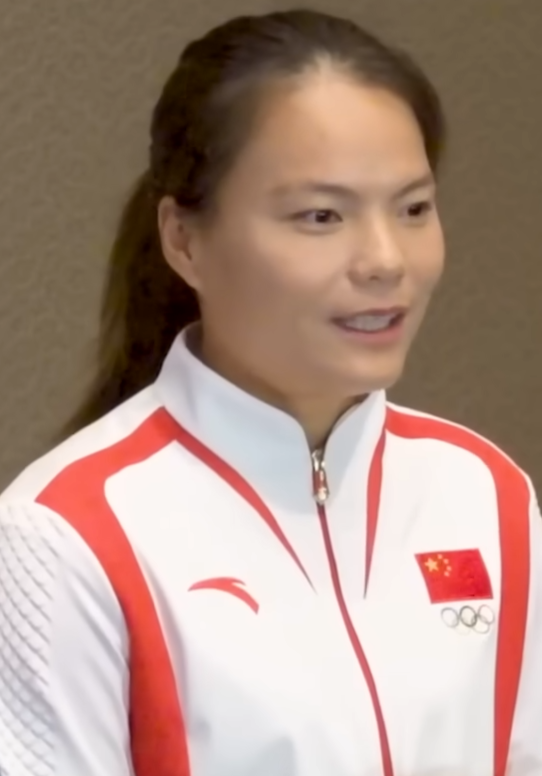
- Xu in 2024

Personal information
- Nationality: Chinese
- Born: 16 February 1992 (age 34) Yanshan County, Jiangxi, China
- Height: 171 cm (5 ft 7 in)

Sport
- Country: China
- Sport: Sprint canoe
- Event: C–2 500 m
Medal record
Women's canoe sprint
Representing China
Olympic Games
Gold medal – first place	2020 Tokyo	C-2 500 m
Gold medal – first place	2024 Paris	C-2 500 m
World Championships
Gold medal – first place	2019 Szeged	C-2 500 m
Gold medal – first place	2022 Dartmouth	C-2 500 m
Gold medal – first place	2023 Duisburg	C-2 500 m
Asian Championships
Gold medal – first place	2025 Nanchang	C-2 500 m
Asian Games
Gold medal – first place	2022 Hangzhou	C-2 500 m

Xu Shixiao (Chinese: 徐诗晓; pinyin: Xú Shīxiǎo, born 16 February 1992) is a Chinese sprint canoeist. She won the gold medal with her teammate Sun Mengya in women's C-2 500 metres at 2020 Summer Olympics in Tokyo and 2024 Summer Olympics in Paris.

== Career ==
She studied at Jiangxi Normal University.

She competed at the 2018 ICF Canoe Sprint World Championships, and won a gold medal at the 2019 ICF Canoe Sprint World Championships.

She qualified for the 2020 Summer Olympics, where she and her partner Sun Mengya won the gold medal in women's C-2 500 metres in the event's debut on the Olympic stage, as the Olympics moves toward gender equality.
