= Josephine Bulmer =

Australian canoeist

Personal information
- Nationality: Australian
- Born: 18 October 1996 (age 29) South Australia

Sport
- Country: Australia
- Sport: Canoe sprint

Josephine Bulmer (born 18 October 1996) is an Australian canoeist. She qualified to represent Australia at the 2020 Summer Olympics and competed in the Women's C-1 200 metres and with Bernadette Wallace in the Women's C-2 500 metres. They were unable to progress past the quarterfinals of the women’s C-1 200m, while they finished 13th as a pair in the C-2 500m.

== Early years ==
At a young age Bulmer watched her brother paddling. He was selected for the South Australian Sports Institute's talent identification program and Bulmer decided to follow him into Kayaking.

Bulmer grew up in North Haven South Australia and spent nine years climbing the junior ranks and represented Australia at the 2014 Junior World Championships. Here, she finished in the top 10 of the K1 and K4 500 metres.

At the age of 19, encouraged by her coach, Bulmer made the switch to canoe events.

== Achievements ==
Bulmer represented Australia at the 2016 and 2017 World Championships. She then made her elite debut in 2018 at the World Cup event in Germany, Here she secured her first-ever senior final in a C1 200 event.

Canoe racing made its debut on the women's schedule at the Tokyo 2020 Olympics and Bulmer wrote sporting history when she and paddle partner Bernadette Wallace secured Australia's first-ever women's Olympic Canoe quota spots. The pair won the C2 500 at the Oceania Canoe Sprint Championships and Bulmer's Tokyo 2020 Olympic debut was confirmed.
