= Sophie Koch (canoeist) =

German sprint canoer

Personal information
- Full name: Sophie Ulrike Koch
- Nationality: German
- Born: 4 October 1997 (age 28)
- Height: 1.70 m (5 ft 7 in)

Sport
- Country: Germany
- Sport: Canoe sprint
Medal record
World Championships
Silver medal – second place	2022 Dartmouth	C-2 Mix 500 m
European Championships
Silver medal – second place	2021 Poznań	C-2 500 m
Bronze medal – third place	2022 Munich	C-2 200 m

Sophie Ulrike Koch (born 4 October 1997) is a German sprint canoer.

She qualified at the 2020 Summer Olympics, in the C-1 200 meters, and C-2 500 meters.

She competed at the 2018 ICF Canoe Sprint World Championships, and at the 2021 Canoe Sprint World Cup.
