= Bernadette Wallace =

Australian canoeist

Personal information
- Born: 8 August 1989 (age 37) New South Wales, Australia
- Height: 1.86 m (6 ft 1 in)

Sport
- Country: Australia
- Sport: Canoe sprint

Bernadette Wallace (born 1989) is an Australian canoeist. She qualified to represent Australia at the 2020 Summer Olympics. She competed in the Women's C-1 200 metres and with Josephine Bulmer in the Women's C-2 500 metres. They were unable to progress past the quarterfinals of the women’s C-1 200m, while they finished 13th as a pair in the C-2 500m.

== Early years ==
Ken Wallace, Bernadette Wallace's brother, was a major influence in her taking up kayaking. He made history when he became Australia's most successful male Olympian at the Beijing 2008 Olympics, winning two gold medals in the K1 500 and 1000 events.

In her youth Wallace was a keen sportswoman with a full roster of sports including swimming, surf lifesaving and figure skating, She still found time to get along to a nearby creek and try kayaking. Wallace then focused on kayaking and made her senior international debut a few years later.

== Achievements ==
In 2013, Wallace won world cup medals in the K1 5000 and K2 1000 teaming with Olympian Naomi Flood. Her bid to make the Rio 2016 Olympics was cut short due to a cancer scare. Weeks before the selection trials she was diagnosed with melanoma following the removal of a lump on her neck.

Wallace then accepted a coaching position in Canada and began canoeing to keep up with her young squad.

At the age of 27, Wallace achieved her biggest personal and sporting achievement when she returned to the sport in a different class of boat, while coaching in Canada. She returned from Canada and relocated to South Australia to base with paddle partner, Josephine Bulmer.

Canoe racing made its debut on the women's schedule at the Tokyo 2020 Olympics and Wallace wrote sporting history when she and paddle partner Josephine Bulmer secured Australia's first-ever women's Olympic Canoe quota spots. The pair won the C2 500 at the Oceania Canoe Sprint Championships and Wallace's Tokyo 2020 Olympic debut was confirmed.
