= Margarita Torlopova =

Kazakh canoeist (born 1998)

Personal information
- Native name: Маргарита Дмитриевна Торлопова
- Full name: Margarita Dmitriyevna Torlopova
- Born: 21 October 1998 (age 27) Oskemen, Kazakhstan
- Height: 1.70 m (5 ft 7 in)

Sport
- Country: Kazakhstan
- Sport: Canoeing
- Event: Women's C-1 200 metres
Medal record
Women's sprint canoe
Representing Kazakhstan
Asian Championships
Silver medal – second place	2022 Rayong	C-2 200 m
Silver medal – second place	2022 Rayong	C-2 500 m
Bronze medal – third place	2022 Rayong	C-1 200 m
Bronze medal – third place	2025 Nanchang	Mixed C-4 500 m
Asian Games
Silver medal – second place	2022 Hangzhou	C-2 200 m

Margarita Torlopova (Маргарита Торлопова, born 21 October 1998) is a Kazakh canoeist. She competed for Kazakhstan at the 2020 Summer Olympics in the women's C-2 500 metres with Svetlana Ussova.

Torlopova also represented Kazakhstan at the 2022 Asian Games, where she earned a silver medal along with Ulyana Kisseleva in the women's C-2 200 metres.

== Career ==
She competed at the 2017 Canoe Sprint World Cup, 2018 Canoe Sprint World Cup, and 2020 ICF Junior & U23 Canoe Sprint World Championships.
