= Yuka Ono =

Japanese sprint canoeist

Personal information
- Nationality: Japanese
- Born: 2 August 1990 (age 36) Honjō, Akita
- Height: 160 cm (5 ft 3 in)
- Weight: 58 kg (128 lb)

Sport
- Country: Japan
- Sport: Sprint canoe
- Event: K-1 200 m
Medal record
Women's canoe sprint
Representing Japan
Asian Games
Bronze medal – third place	2018 Jakarta	K-1 200 m

Yuka Ono (Japanese: 小野 祐佳; born 2 August 1990) is a Japanese sprint canoeist. She qualified for the 2020 Summer Olympics.

She participated at the 2018 Asian Games, and 2018 ICF Canoe Sprint World Cup.
