= Orasa Thiangkathok =

Thai canoeist

Personal information
- Nationality: Thai
- Born: 18 June 1998 (age 28)

Sport
- Sport: Sprint kayak
Medal record
Women's sprint canoe
Representing Thailand
Asian Games
Silver medal – second place	2022 Hangzhou	C-1 200 m
Bronze medal – third place	2022 Hangzhou	C-2 500 m
Asian Championships
Gold medal – first place	2022 Rayong	C-1 200 m
Gold medal – first place	2022 Rayong	C-1 500 m
Bronze medal – third place	2022 Rayong	C-2 200 m
Bronze medal – third place	2022 Rayong	C-2 500 m
Southeast Asian Games
Gold medal – first place	2021 Vietnam	C-2 500 m
Gold medal – first place	2025 Thailand	C-2 200 m
Silver medal – second place	2021 Vietnam	C-1 200 m
Silver medal – second place	2021 Vietnam	C-4 200 m
Silver medal – second place	2025 Thailand	C-2 500 m
Bronze medal – third place	2021 Vietnam	C-1 500 m
Bronze medal – third place	2021 Vietnam	C-4 1000 m

Orasa Thiangkathok (Thai: อรสา เที่ยงกระโทก; born 18 June 1998) is a Thai canoeist. She represented Thailand at the 2020 Summer Olympics in Tokyo, competing in the Women's Canoe Double 500m event.
