= Dilnoza Rakhmatova =

Uzbekistani sprint canoeist (born 1998)

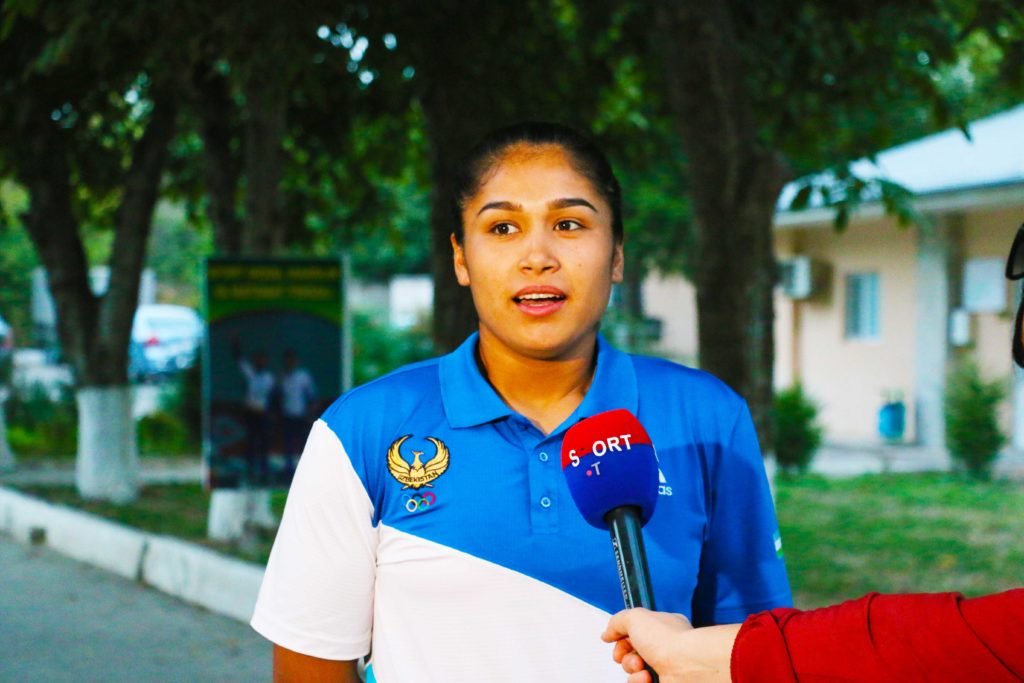

Personal information
- Nationality: Uzbekistani
- Born: 7 February 1998 (age 28) Chirchiq, Uzbekistan

Sport
- Country: Uzbekistan
- Sport: Sprint canoe
- Event: C-2 200 m
Medal record
Women's canoe sprint
Representing Uzbekistan
World Championships
Bronze medal – third place	2019 Szeged	C-2 200 m
Asian Games
Silver medal – second place	2018 Jakarta-Palembang	C-2 500 m
Bronze medal – third place	2018 Jakarta-Palembang	C-1 200 m
Asian Championships
Gold medal – first place	2017 Shanghai	C-2 200 m
Silver medal – second place	2017 Shanghai	C-2 500 m
Silver medal – second place	2022 Rayong	C-1 200 m
Bronze medal – third place	2022 Rayong	C-4 500 m

Dilnoza Bakirovna Rahmatova (born 7 February 1998) is an Uzbekistani sprint canoeist.

She won a medal at the 2019 ICF Canoe Sprint World Championships.
