= Teruko Kiriake =

Japanese sprint canoer

Personal information
- Nationality: Japanese
- Born: 6 November 1996 (age 29) Yame, Fukuoka
- Height: 166 cm (5 ft 5 in)
- Weight: 68 kg (150 lb)

Sport
- Country: Japan
- Sport: Canoe sprint
Medal record
Women's canoe sprint
Representing Japan
Asian Championships
Gold medal – first place	2017 Shanghai	C-4 500 m

Teruko Kiriake (Japanese: 桐明 輝子, born 6 November 1996) is a Japanese sprint canoer.

She qualified at the 2020 Summer Olympics, in the C-1 200 meters, and C-2 500 meters.

She competed at the 2018 ICF Canoe Sprint World Championships, and at the 2019 and 2021 Canoe Sprint World Cup.
