= Karen Roco =

Chilean canoeist (born 1986)

Personal details
- Born: 7 October 1986 (age 39) Constitución, Chile
- Party: Independent
- Children: 1
- Education: Santo Tomás University (BA)
- Occupation: Canoeist
- Profession: Physical Trainer
- Sports career
- Height: 1.76 m (5 ft 9 in)
- Sport: Canoeing
- Event: Women's C-2 500 metres
Medal record
Women's canoe sprint
Representing Chile
Pan American Games
Silver medal – second place	2019 Lima	C-2 Mix 500 m

Karen Macarena Roco Aceituno (born 7 October 1986) is a Chilean canoeist. She is commonly known in her country to compete alongside María José Mailliard, with whom she has been interviewed or referenced multiple times.

== Early life ==
Between 1996 and 1997, Roco began to do canoe when she was 10 in her hometown Constitución, where she attended the Eduardo Martín Abejón School, whose then director was the President of the Chilean Canoeing Federation. According Roco, she was «very restless and they ―the teachers―» used to send her to the inspector's office.

With the goal to improve her skills, the director decided to send her to a sports workshop dedicated to canoeing when still she didn't know how to swim. Thus, all her "classmates wanted to go", the reason why she had a stimulus to get into canoeing.

== Sports career ==
On 29 July 2019, Roco alongside María José Mailliard obtained a silver medal in the 2019 Pan American Games.

On 18 January 2021, Roco was honored in her hometown Constitución by the mayor of the city and Cecilia Pérez, then minister of Sport of the second government of Sebastián Piñera (2018−2022).

She competed with Mailliard in the 2020 Summer Olympics. There, they finished in the ninth place.

== Political career ==
On 6 August 2021, it was reported that Roco will run for regional councilor of the Maule Region in quota for Evópoli, centre-rightist party.
