= Nilufar Zokirova =

Uzbekistani sprint canoeist (born 1997)

- Zokirova (2022)

Personal information
- Full name: Nilufar Obidzhonovna Zokirova
- Nationality: Uzbekistani
- Born: 15 June 1997 (age 29) Tashkent, Uzbekistan
- Height: 1.70 m (5 ft 7 in) (2022)

Sport
- Country: Uzbekistan
- Sport: Sprint canoe
- Event: C-2 200 m
Medal record
Women's canoe sprint
Representing Uzbekistan
World Championships
Silver medal – second place	2026 Poznań	C-2 200 m
Bronze medal – third place	2019 Szeged	C-2 200 m
Asian Games
Silver medal – second place	2018 Jakarta-Palembang	C-2 500 m
Silver medal – second place	2026 Aichi–Nagoya	C-2 500 m
Silver medal – second place	2026 Aichi–Nagoya	Mixed C-2 500 m
Asian Championships
Gold medal – first place	2017 Shanghai	C-2 200 m
Gold medal – first place	2022 Rayong	C-2 500 m
Gold medal – first place	2024 Tokyo	C-1 200 m
Silver medal – second place	2017 Shanghai	C-2 500 m
Bronze medal – third place	2022 Rayong	C-4 500 m

Nilufar Obidzhonovna Zokirova (born 15 June 1997) is an Uzbekistani sprint canoeist.

She won a medal at the 2019 ICF Canoe Sprint World Championships.
