= Hungary at the 2024 Summer Olympics =

Hungary at the Games of the XXXIII Olympiad in Paris

- Flag of Hungary
- IOC code: HUN
- NOC: Hungarian Olympic Committee
- Website: www.olimpia.hu (in Hungarian and English)

in Paris, France 26 July 2024 – 11 August 2024
- Competitors: 178 (92 men and 86 women) in 20 sports
- Flag bearers (opening): Krisztián Tóth & Blanka Böde-Bíró
- Flag bearers (closing): Tamara Csipes & Kristóf Milák
- Officials: László Fábián, chef de mission
- Medals Ranked 14th: Gold 6 Silver 7 Bronze 6 Total 19

Summer Olympics appearances (overview)
- 1896; 1900; 1904; 1908; 1912; 1920; 1924; 1928; 1932; 1936; 1948; 1952; 1956; 1960; 1964; 1968; 1972; 1976; 1980; 1984; 1988; 1992; 1996; 2000; 2004; 2008; 2012; 2016; 2020; 2024; 2028

Other related appearances
- 1906 Intercalated Games

Hungary competed at the 2024 Summer Olympics in Paris from 26 July to 11 August 2024. Hungarian athletes have appeared in every edition of the Summer Olympic Games except two: Antwerp 1920 because of the country's role in World War I and Los Angeles 1984 as part of the Soviet-led boycott.

== Medalists ==
The following Hungarian competitors won medals at the games. In the discipline sections below, the medalists' names are bolded.

Medal	Name	Sport	Event	Date
Gold	Hubert Kós	Swimming	Men's 200 m backstroke	1 August
Gold	Tibor Andrásfi; Máté Tamás Koch; Gergely Siklósi; Dávid Nagy	Fencing	Men's team épée	2 August
Gold	Kristóf Milák	Swimming	Men's 100 m butterfly	3 August
Gold	Kristóf Rasovszky	Swimming	Men's marathon 10 km	9 August
Gold	Viviana Márton	Taekwondo	Women's 67 kg	9 August
Gold	Michelle Gulyás	Modern pentathlon	Women's individual	11 August
Silver	Kristóf Milák	Swimming	Men's 200 m butterfly	31 July
Silver	Csanád Gémesi; Krisztián Rabb; András Szatmári; Áron Szilágyi	Fencing	Men's team sabre	31 July
Silver	Bence Halász	Athletics	Men's hammer throw	4 August
Silver	Tamara Csipes; Alida Dóra Gazsó	Canoeing	Women's K-2 500 m	9 August
Silver	Bence Nádas; Sándor Tótka	Canoeing	Men's K-2 500 m	9 August
Silver	Tamara Csipes	Canoeing	Women's K-1 500 m	10 August
Silver	Ádám Varga	Canoeing	Men's K-1 1000 m	10 August
Bronze	Eszter Muhari	Fencing	Women's épée	27 July
Bronze	Veronika Major	Shooting	Women's 25 m pistol	3 August
Bronze	Tamara Csipes; Sára Fojt; Alida Dóra Gazsó; Noémi Pupp	Canoeing	Women's K-4 500 m	8 August
Bronze	Dávid Betlehem	Swimming	Men's marathon 10 km	9 August
Bronze	Sára Fojt; Noémi Pupp	Canoeing	Women's K-2 500 m	9 August
Bronze	Bálint Kopasz	Canoeing	Men's K-1 1000 m	10 August

Medals by sport
**Sport**	1st place, gold medalist(s)	2nd place, silver medalist(s)	3rd place, bronze medalist(s)	Total
Swimming	3	1	1	5
Fencing	1	1	1	3
Taekwondo	1	0	0	1
Modern pentathlon	1	0	0	1
Canoeing	0	4	3	7
Athletics	0	1	0	1
Shooting	0	0	1	1
Total	6	7	6	19

Medals by gender
**Gender**	1st place, gold medalist(s)	2nd place, silver medalist(s)	3rd place, bronze medalist(s)	**Total**
Male	4	5	2	**11**
Female	2	2	4	**8**
Mixed	0	0	0	**0**
Total	6	7	6	19

=== Multiple medalists ===
The following competitors won multiple medals at the 2024 Olympic Games.

Name	Medal	Sport	Event
Kristóf Milák	Gold; Silver	Swimming	Men's 100 m butterfly Men's 200 m butterfly
Tamara Csipes	Silver; Silver; Bronze	Canoeing	Women's K-1 500 m Women's K-2 500 m Women's K-4 500 m
Alida Dóra Gazsó	Silver; Bronze	Canoeing	Women's K-2 500 m Women's K-4 500 m
Sára Fojt	Bronze; Bronze	Canoeing	Women's K-2 500 m Women's K-4 500 m
Noémi Pupp	Bronze; Bronze	Canoeing	Women's K-2 500 m Women's K-4 500 m

== Competitors ==
The following is the list of number of competitors in the Games. Note that reserves in handball and water polo are not counted:

Sport	Men	Women	Total
Athletics	6	12	18
Boxing	2	1	3
Canoeing	9	7	16
Cycling	1	1	2
Equestrian	1	0	1
Fencing	9	6	15
Gymnastics	1	4	5
Handball	17	17	34
Judo	4	3	7
Modern pentathlon	2	2	4
Rowing	1	0	1
Sailing	1	1	2
Shooting	2	3	5
Swimming	12	11	23
Table tennis	1	2	3
Taekwondo	2	1	3
Tennis	2	0	2
Triathlon	2	1	3
Water polo	13	13	26
Wrestling	4	1	5
Total	92	86	178

Medals by date
Day	Date	1st place, gold medalist(s)	2nd place, silver medalist(s)	3rd place, bronze medalist(s)	Total
Day 1	27 July	0	0	1	1
Day 2	28 July	0	0	0	0
Day 3	29 July	0	0	0	0
Day 4	30 July	0	0	0	0
Day 5	31 July	0	2	0	2
Day 6	1 August	1	0	0	1
Day 7	2 August	1	0	0	1
Day 8	3 August	1	0	1	2
Day 9	4 August	0	1	0	1
Day 10	5 August	0	0	0	0
Day 11	6 August	0	0	0	0
Day 12	7 August	0	0	0	0
Day 13	8 August	0	0	1	1
Day 14	9 August	2	2	2	6
Day 15	10 August	0	2	1	3
Day 16	11 August	1	0	0	1
Total		6	7	6	19

== Athletics ==
Hungarian track and field athletes achieved the entry standards for Paris 2024, either by passing the direct qualifying mark (or time for track and road races) or by world ranking, in the following events (a maximum of 3 athletes each):

Key

- Note–Ranks given for track events are within the athlete's heat only
- Q = Qualified for the next round
- q = Qualified for the next round as a fastest loser or, in field events, by position without achieving the qualifying target
- NR = National record
- N/A = Round not applicable for the event
- Bye = Athlete not required to compete in round

Track & road events

Athlete	Event	Heat		Repechage		Semifinal		Final	
Athlete	Event	Result	Rank	Result	Rank	Result	Rank	Result	Rank
Attila Molnár	Men's 400 m	45.24	6	45.45	3	Did not advance			29
Máté Helebrandt	Men's 20 km walk	—N/a						1:27:17	44
Bence Venyercsán	Men's 20 km walk	—N/a						1:29:14	46
Boglárka Takács	Women's 100 m	11.10	3 Q	—N/a		11.26	7	Did not advance	18
Boglárka Takács	Women's 200m	23.16	6	23.05	2	Did not advance			32
Viktória Wagner-Gyürkés	Women's 5000 m	15:48.24	18	Did not advance					37
Luca Kozák	Women's 100 m hurdles	13.11	6	12.96 SB	3	Did not advance			29
Gréta Kerekes	Women's 100 m hurdles	13.50	7	13.20	5	Did not advance			36
Viktória Madarász	Women's 20 km walk	—N/a						1:35:54	42
Rita Récsei	Women's 20 km walk	—N/a						1:34:39	33
Barbara Oláh; Bence Venyercsán	Mixed marathon walk relay	—N/a						3:05:18	21

Field events

Athlete	Event	Qualification		Final	
Athlete	Event	Distance	Position	Distance	Position
Bence Halász	Men's hammer throw	76.90	6 q	79.97	2nd place, silver medalist(s)
Dániel Rába	Men's hammer throw	72.29	21	Did not advance	
Donát Varga	Men's hammer throw	71.65	25	Did not advance	
Hanga Klekner	Women's pole vault	4.40	25	Did not advance	
Petra Farkas	Women's long jump	6.40	21	Did not advance	
Réka Gyurátz	Women's hammer throw	64.77	30	Did not advance	

Combined events – Women's heptathlon

Athlete	Event	100H	HJ	SP	200 m	LJ	JT	800 m	Final	Rank
Xénia Krizsán	Result	13.61	1.77	13.89	24.92	6.03	49.52	2:06.27	6386	7
Xénia Krizsán	Points	1034 SB	941 SB	787	894 SB	859	851 SB	1020 PB	6386	7
Rita Nemes	Result	13.82	1.77	13.64	25.61	5.88	43.64	2:10.10	6060	18
Rita Nemes	Points	1004	941	770	832	813	737	963 PB	6060	18

== Boxing ==
Hungary entered three boxers (two men and one woman) into the Olympic tournament. Richárd Kovács (men's lightweight), with Luca Hámori (women's welterweight) slated to become the country's first female boxer at the Games, secured the spots on the Hungarian squad in their respective weight divisions by advancing to the semifinal match at the 2023 European Games in Nowy Targ, Poland. Meanwhile, Pylyp Akilov (men's middleweight) qualified for the games by winning the quota bouts round at the 2024 World Olympic Qualification Tournament 1 in Busto Arsizio, Italy.

Athlete	Event	Round of 32	Round of 16	Quarterfinals	Semifinals	Final	
Athlete	Event	Opposition Result	Opposition Result	Opposition Result	Opposition Result	Opposition Result	Rank
Richárd Kovács	Men's 63.5 kg	Bye	Garside (AUS); W 5–0	Oumiha (FRA); L 0–5	Did not advance		5
Pylyp Akilov	Men's 80 kg	Bye	Khyzhniak (UKR); L 0–4	Did not advance			
Luca Hámori	Women's 66 kg	Walsh (IRL); W 4–1	Williamson (AUS); W 5–0	Khelif (ALG); L 0–5	Did not advance		5

== Canoeing ==
=== Sprint ===
Hungarian canoeists qualified boats in each of the following distances for the Games through the 2023 ICF Canoe Sprint World Championships in Duisburg, Germany; and 2024 European Qualifier in Szeged. The list of athletes chosen to represent the country was revealed on 20 June 2024.

Athlete	Event	Heats		Quarterfinals		Semifinals		Final	
Athlete	Event	Time	Rank	Time	Rank	Time	Rank	Time	Rank
Balázs Adolf	Men's C-1 1000 m	3:48.21	3 QF	3:53.65	1 SF	3:46.61	4 FA	3:49.83	7
Dániel Fejes	Men's C-1 1000 m	3:56.00	4 QF	3:47.88	1 SF	3:47.83	5 FB	3:50.22	10
Balázs Adolf; Jonatán Hajdu	Men's C-2 500 m	1:40.02	4 QF	1:40.95	2 SF	1:39.83	2 FA	1:41.66	6
Bálint Kopasz	Men's K-1 1000 m	3:26.44	1 SF	Bye		3:28.76	1 FA	3:25.68	3rd place, bronze medalist(s)
Ádám Varga	Men's K-1 1000 m	3:28.56	1 SF	Bye		3:27.92	1 FA	3:24.76	2nd place, silver medalist(s)
Bence Nádas; Sándor Tótka	Men's K-2 500 m	1:29.08	2 SF	Bye		1:28.38	2 FA	1:27.15	2nd place, silver medalist(s)
Bálint Kopasz; Ádám Varga	Men's K-2 500 m	1:29.37	2 SF	Bye		1:29.66	5 FB	1:32.85	15
Kolos Csizmadia; István Kuli; Bence Nádas; Sándor Tótka	Men's K-4 500 m	1:21.18	2 SF	Bye		1:21.07	2 FA	1:21.99	7
Ágnes Kiss	Women's C-1 200 m	48.00	3 QF	47.13	2 SF	47.01	8 FB	46.54	11
Kincső Takács	Women's C-1 200 m	46.60	3 QF	47.47	1 SF	46.37	4 FA	45.68	8
Ágnes Kiss; Bianka Nagy	Women's C-2 500 m	1:56.82	3 QF	1:59.89	1 SF	1:55.51	2 FA	1:54.90	4
Tamara Csipes	Women's K-1 500 m	1:50.21	1 SF	Bye		1:48.72	1 FA	1:48.44	2nd place, silver medalist(s)
Alida Dóra Gazsó	Women's K-1 500 m	1:50.78	1 SF	Bye		1:49.76	1 FA	1:51.19	6
Tamara Csipes; Alida Dóra Gazsó	Women's K-2 500 m	1:42.68	3 QF	1:40.57	1 SF	1:39.76	3 FA	1:39.39	2nd place, silver medalist(s)
Sára Fojt; Noémi Pupp	Women's K-2 500 m	1:39.44	3 QF	1:41.90	4 SF	1:39.89	4 FA	1:39.46	3rd place, bronze medalist(s)
Tamara Csipes; Alida Dóra Gazsó; Sára Fojt; Noémi Pupp	Women's K-4 500 m	1:33.42	2 FA	—N/a		Bye		1:32.93	3rd place, bronze medalist(s)

Qualification Legend: FA = Qualify to final (medal); FB = Qualify to final B (non-medal)

== Cycling ==
=== Road ===
Hungary entered one male and one female rider to compete in the road race events at the Olympic. Hungary secured those quota through the UCI Nation Ranking and 2023 World Championships in Glasgow, Great Britain.

Athlete	Event	Time	Rank
Attila Valter	Men's road race	6:20:50	4
Attila Valter	Men's time trial	38:45.68	22
Blanka Vas	Women's road race	4:00.21	4

=== Mountain biking ===
Hungarian mountain bikers secured one female quota place for the Olympic through 2023 UCI Mountain Bike World Championships in Glasgow, Great Britain.

Athlete	Event	Time	Rank
Blanka Vas	Women's cross-country	1:31.42	10

== Equestrian ==
Hungary entered two riders, one in dressage and one in the eventing event, through the establishments of final olympics ranking for Group C (Central & Eastern Europe; Central Asia), signifying the country's return to the sporting scene since 1996. Last minute, an individual dressage spot opened to Hungary because Moldova's first rider was tested positive on a doping control, while Moldova's second rider did not obtain the required MER results. On the 24th of June, the suspension was lifted which led to no spot for Hungary in dressage.

=== Eventing ===
Athlete	Horse	Event	Dressage		Cross-country			Jumping						Total	
Athlete	Horse	Event	Dressage		Cross-country			Qualifier			Final			Total	
Athlete	Horse	Event	Penalties	Rank	Penalties	Total	Rank	Penalties	Total	Rank	Penalties	Total	Rank	Penalties	Rank
Balázs Kaizinger	Herr Cooles Classico	Individual	45.80	62	16.00	61.80	45	10.00	71.80	41	Did not advance			71.80	41

== Fencing ==
Hungary entered fifteen fencers into the Olympic competition. Dániel Dósa, Flóra Pásztor and Anna Kun secured their quotas in their respective events, after nominated as one of two highest ranked individual fencers, eligible for European zone; meanwhile, men's épée team, the men's and women's sabre team qualified after becoming one of four worldwide highest ranked teams, through the release of the FIE Official ranking for Paris 2024. In May 2024 WADA banned Anna Kun from international sport for 2 years due to rule violation. Eszter Muhari took her place as the fencer next in line in qualification.

Men

Athlete	Event	Round of 64	Round of 32	Round of 16	Quarterfinal	Semifinal	Final / BM	
Athlete	Event	Opposition Score	Opposition Score	Opposition Score	Opposition Score	Opposition Score	Opposition Score	Rank
Tibor Andrásfi	Épée	Bye	Limardo (VEN); W 15–10	Lugo (VEN); W 13–12	Vismara (ITA); W 15–13	Koki (JPN); L 13–14	El-Sayed (EGY); L 7–8	4
Máté Tamás Koch	Épée	Bye	Lugo (VEN); L 10–15	Did not advance				
Gergely Siklósi	Épée	Bye	Jurka (CZE); W 15–5	Loyola (BEL); L 13–14	Did not advance			
Tibor Andrásfi; Máté Tamás Koch; Gergely Siklósi; Dávid Nagy*	Team épée	—N/a			Kazakhstan; W 45–30	France; W 45–30	Japan; W 26–25	1st place, gold medalist(s)
Dániel Dósa	Foil	Bye	Tolba (EGY); L 14–15	Did not advance				
Csanád Gémesi	Sabre	Bye	Dershwitz (USA); W 15–10	Ferjani (TUN); L 14–15	Did not advance			
András Szatmári	Sabre	Bye	Apithy (FRA); L 13–15	Did not advance				
Áron Szilágyi	Sabre	Bye	Arfa (CAN); L 8–15	Did not advance				
Csanád Gémesi; András Szatmári; Áron Szilágyi; Krisztián Rabb*	Team sabre	—N/a			Italy; W 45–38	Iran; W 45–43	South Korea; L 41–45	2nd place, silver medalist(s)

Women

Athlete	Event	Round of 64	Round of 32	Round of 16	Quarterfinal	Semifinal	Final / BM	
Athlete	Event	Opposition Score	Opposition Score	Opposition Score	Opposition Score	Opposition Score	Opposition Score	Rank
Eszter Muhari	Épée	Bye	Tang (CHN); W 15–10	Song (KOR); W 15–6	Sihan (CHN); W 15–10	Mallo (FRA); L 9–15	Differt (EST); W 15–14	3rd place, bronze medalist(s)
Flóra Pásztor	Foil	Bye	Dubrovich (USA); W 15–12	Zang (CAN); W 15–5	Kiefer (USA); L 4–15	Did not advance		
Anna Márton	Sabre	Paredes (VEN); W 15–10	Martín-Portugués (ESP); W 15–8	Pusztai (HUN); W 15–7	Kharlan (UKR); L 7–15	Did not advance		6
Liza Pusztai	Sabre	Bye	Battiston (ITA); W 15–12	Márton (HUN); L 7–15	Did not advance			
Luca Szűcs	Sabre	Bye	Criscio (ITA); W 15–10	Ilieva (BUL); W 15–10	Balzer (FRA); L 12–15	Did not advance		7
Anna Márton; Liza Pusztai; Luca Szűcs; Sugár Katinka Battai*	Team sabre	—N/a			Japan; L 37–45	Did not advance		6

== Gymnastics ==
=== Artistic ===
Hungary qualified four artistic gymnasts for the games. Krisztofer Mészáros and Bettina Lili Czifra qualified due to being among the highest-ranked eligible athletes in the all-around qualification at the 2023 World Artistic Gymnastics Championships in Antwerp, Belgium. Csenge Bácskay qualified as being the highest-ranked eligible athlete in the vault event final at the 2023 World Championships. Additionally, due to the Hungarian women's team finishing 15th in qualifications, they earned a non-nominative berth as well. Initially Zsófia Kovács was nominated by the Hungarian Gymnastics Federation for the quota place, however at a training in Paris few days before the start of the games Kovács got injured, and Zója Székely took over her place as a reserve.

Men

Athlete	Event	Qualification								Final							
Athlete	Event	Apparatus						Total	Rank	Apparatus						Total	Rank
Athlete	Event	F	PH	R	V	PB	HB	Total	Rank	F	PH	R	V	PB	HB	Total	Rank
Krisztofer Mészáros	All-around	12.900	13.633	13.500	14.366	14.733	13.666	82.798	14 Q	13.933	14.100	13.400	14.400	14.300	13.766	83.899	9

Women

Athlete	Event	Qualification						Final					
Athlete	Event	Apparatus				Total	Rank	Apparatus				Total	Rank
Athlete	Event	V	UB	BB	F	Total	Rank	V	UB	BB	F	Total	Rank
Csenge Bácskay	All-around	13.766	—N/a					Did not advance					
Bettina Lili Czifra	All-around	12.966	13.933	13.233	12.6	52.732	22 Q	12.966	13.900	11.400	12.833	51.099	21
Zója Székely	All-around	—N/a	13.433	—N/a				Did not advance					

=== Rhythmic ===
Hungary qualified one rhythmic gymnast for the individual all-around at the 2023 World Championship in Valencia, Spain.

Athlete	Event	Qualification						Final					
Athlete	Event	Hoop	Ball	Clubs	Ribbon	Total	Rank	Hoop	Ball	Clubs	Ribbon	Total	Rank
Fanni Pigniczki	Individual	32.650 (11)	32.600 (12)	30.450 (15)	31.650 (10)	127.350	12 R2	Did not advance					

== Handball ==
Summary

Key:

- ET: After extra time
- P – Match decided by penalty-shootout.

Team	Event	Group Stage						Quarterfinal	Semifinal	Final / BM	
Team	Event	Opposition Score	Opposition Score	Opposition Score	Opposition Score	Opposition Score	Rank	Opposition Score	Opposition Score	Opposition Score	Rank
Hungary men's	Men's tournament	Egypt; L 32–35	Argentina; W 35–25	Norway; L 25–26	Denmark; L 25–28	France; L 20–24	5	Did not advance			10
Hungary women's	Women's tournament	France; L 28–31	Brazil; W 25–24	Angola; D 31–31	Spain; W 27–24	Netherlands; L 26–30	3 Q	Sweden; L 32–36	Did not advance		6

=== Men's tournament ===
Hungary men's national handball team qualified for the Olympics by securing a top two spot at the 2024 IHF Men's Olympic Qualification Tournaments.

Team roster

A 20-player roster was announced on 4 June 2024. The final squad was announced on 5 July 2024.

Head coach: (Spain) Chema Rodríguez

No.	Pos.	Name	Date of birth (age)	Height	App.	Goals	Club
2	P	Adrián Sipos	8 March 1990 (aged 34)	1.98 m	82	37	(Germany) MT Melsungen
7	LW	Bendegúz Bóka	2 October 1993 (aged 30)	1.95 m	86	207	(Hungary) Balatonfüredi KSE
11	LB	Patrik Ligetvári	13 February 1996 (aged 28)	2.03 m	101	88	(Hungary) Telekom Veszprém
16	GK	Roland Mikler	20 September 1984 (aged 39)	1.92 m	245	1	(Hungary) OTP Bank-Pick Szeged
24	CB	Gergő Fazekas	31 October 2003 (aged 20)	1.90 m	27	43	(Poland) Wisła Płock
26	RW	Pedro Rodríguez Álvarez	22 August 1990 (aged 33)	1.97 m	40	104	(Hungary) MOL-Tatabánya KC
27	P	Bence Bánhidi	9 February 1995 (aged 29)	2.06 m	113	347	(Hungary) OTP Bank-Pick Szeged
30	LB	Zoltán Szita	10 February 1998 (aged 26)	1.96 m	75	171	(Poland) Wisła Płock
32	GK	Kristóf Palasics	19 April 2002 (aged 22)	1.99 m	15	0	(Spain) BM Logroño La Rioja
33	RB	Gábor Ancsin	27 November 1990 (aged 33)	2.02 m	161	360	(Hungary) Ferencvárosi TC
39	LB	Richárd Bodó	13 March 1993 (aged 31)	2.03 m	112	330	(Hungary) OTP Bank-Pick Szeged
43	RB	Zoran Ilić	2 January 2002 (aged 22)	1.97 m	34	42	(Germany) HSV Hamburg
45	P	Miklós Rosta	14 February 1999 (aged 25)	2.03 m	65	178	(Romania) CS Dinamo București
61	GK	László Bartucz	5 November 1991 (aged 32)	1.94 m	29	0	(Hungary) MOL-Tatabánya KC
66	CB	Máté Lékai	16 June 1988 (aged 36)	1.90 m	182	548	(Hungary) Ferencvárosi TC
77	CB	Egon Hanusz	25 September 1997 (aged 26)	1.77 m	52	78	(Portugal) Benfica
91	RW	Bence Imre	15 October 2002 (aged 21)	1.86 m	17	76	(Germany) THW Kiel

Group play

Pos	Team	Pld	W	D	L	GF	GA	GD	Pts	Qualification
1	Denmark	5	5	0	0	165	133	+32	10	Quarterfinals
2	Egypt	5	3	1	1	148	140	+8	7	Quarterfinals
3	Norway	5	3	0	2	139	136	+3	6	Quarterfinals
4	France (H)	5	2	1	2	129	131	−2	5	Quarterfinals
5	Hungary	5	1	0	4	137	138	−1	2	
6	Argentina	5	0	0	5	131	171	−40	0	

Source: Olympics Paris 2024 rankings
Rules for classification: 1) Points; 2) Head-to-head points; 3) Head-to-head goal difference; 4) Head-to-head goals scored; 5) Goal difference; 6) Goals scored; 7) Draw.
(H) Hosts

27 July 2024; 11:00	Hungary	32–35	Egypt	Paris Expo Porte de Versailles, Paris; Attendance: 5,776; Referees: Nachevski, Nikolov (MKD)
27 July 2024; 11:00	Imre 7	(15–19)	Adel, Omar 9	Paris Expo Porte de Versailles, Paris; Attendance: 5,776; Referees: Nachevski, Nikolov (MKD)
27 July 2024; 11:00	4× (suspension)	Report	1× (yellow card) 2× (suspension)	Paris Expo Porte de Versailles, Paris; Attendance: 5,776; Referees: Nachevski, Nikolov (MKD)

29 July 2024; 21:00	Argentina	25–35	Hungary	Paris Expo Porte de Versailles, Paris; Attendance: 5,602; Referees: Schulze, Tönnies (GER)
29 July 2024; 21:00	P. Simonet 5	(12–17)	Imre 7	Paris Expo Porte de Versailles, Paris; Attendance: 5,602; Referees: Schulze, Tönnies (GER)
29 July 2024; 21:00	4× (suspension) 2× (red card)	Report	3× (suspension)	Paris Expo Porte de Versailles, Paris; Attendance: 5,602; Referees: Schulze, Tönnies (GER)

31 July 2024; 09:00	Norway	26–25	Hungary	Paris Expo Porte de Versailles, Paris; Attendance: 5,774; Referees: Lah, Sok (SLO)
31 July 2024; 09:00	Blonz 9	(11–13)	three players 6	Paris Expo Porte de Versailles, Paris; Attendance: 5,774; Referees: Lah, Sok (SLO)
31 July 2024; 09:00	4× (suspension)	Report	3× (suspension)	Paris Expo Porte de Versailles, Paris; Attendance: 5,774; Referees: Lah, Sok (SLO)

2 August 2024; 09:00	Hungary	25–28	Denmark	Paris Expo Porte de Versailles, Paris; Attendance: 5,764; Referees: García, Marín (ESP)
2 August 2024; 09:00	Ilić 5	(14–16)	Gidsel 8	Paris Expo Porte de Versailles, Paris; Attendance: 5,764; Referees: García, Marín (ESP)
2 August 2024; 09:00	6× (suspension)	Report	1× (suspension)	Paris Expo Porte de Versailles, Paris; Attendance: 5,764; Referees: García, Marín (ESP)

4 August 2024; 16:00	Hungary	20–24	France	Paris Expo Porte de Versailles, Paris; Attendance: 5,685; Referees: Hansen, Madsen (DEN)
4 August 2024; 16:00	Imre 6	(8–11)	Prandi 7	Paris Expo Porte de Versailles, Paris; Attendance: 5,685; Referees: Hansen, Madsen (DEN)
4 August 2024; 16:00		Report	1× (yellow card) 2× (suspension)	Paris Expo Porte de Versailles, Paris; Attendance: 5,685; Referees: Hansen, Madsen (DEN)

=== Women's tournament ===
Hungary women's national handball team qualified for the Olympics by securing a top two spot at the 2024 IHF Men's Olympic Qualification Tournaments.

Team roster

The squad was announced on 5 July 2024.

Head coach: Vladimir Golovin

No.	Pos.	Name	Date of birth (age)	Height	App.	Goals	Club
4	P	Petra Füzi-Tóvizi	15 March 1999 (aged 25)	1.78 m	73	85	(Hungary) Debreceni VSC
6	LW	Nadine Szöllősi-Schatzl	19 November 1993 (aged 30)	1.74 m	113	275	(Hungary) Moyra-Budaörs Handball
11	RB	Anna Albek	2 December 2001 (aged 22)	1.89 m	28	31	(Hungary) Mosonmagyaróvári KC SE
15	LB	Kinga Debreczeni-Klivinyi	31 March 1992 (aged 32)	1.75 m	89	186	(Hungary) Moyra-Budaörs Handball
16	GK	Blanka Böde-Bíró	22 September 1994 (aged 29)	1.87 m	116	3	(Hungary) Ferencvárosi TC
19	LW	Gréta Márton	3 October 1999 (aged 24)	1.73 m	78	181	(Hungary) Ferencvárosi TC
28	RB	Nikolett Papp	23 July 1996 (aged 28)	1.82 m	45	58	(Romania) SCM Gloria Buzău
31	GK	Zsófi Szemerey	2 June 1994 (aged 30)	1.83 m	22	0	(France) Metz Handball
32	P	Noémi Pásztor	2 April 1999 (aged 25)	1.78 m	35	33	(France) Neptunes de Nantes
38	CB	Petra Vámos	14 September 2000 (aged 23)	1.75 m	67	168	(France) Metz Handball
42	RB	Katrin Klujber	21 April 1999 (aged 25)	1.70 m	76	405	(Hungary) Ferencvárosi TC
44	LB	Gréta Kácsor	24 April 2000 (aged 24)	1.75 m	39	61	(Romania) Gloria Bistrița-Năsăud
58	P	Réka Bordás	26 August 1997 (aged 26)	1.85 m	54	53	(Hungary) Ferencvárosi TC
59	LB	Csenge Kuczora	26 January 2000 (aged 24)	1.76 m	36	117	(Germany) Thüringer HC
61	GK	Kinga Janurik	6 November 1991 (aged 32)	1.76 m	63	1	(Hungary) Ferencvárosi TC
66	RW	Viktória Győri-Lukács	31 October 1995 (aged 28)	1.68 m	119	342	(Hungary) Győri Audi ETO KC
77	CB	Petra Simon	12 November 2004 (aged 19)	1.68 m	17	45	(Hungary) Ferencvárosi TC

Group play

Pos	Team	Pld	W	D	L	GF	GA	GD	Pts	Qualification
1	France (H)	5	5	0	0	159	124	+35	10	Quarterfinals
2	Netherlands	5	4	0	1	152	137	+15	8	Quarterfinals
3	Hungary	5	2	1	2	137	140	−3	5	Quarterfinals
4	Brazil	5	2	0	3	127	119	+8	4	Quarterfinals
5	Angola	5	1	1	3	131	154	−23	3	
6	Spain	5	0	0	5	111	143	−32	0	

Source: Olympics Paris 2024 rankings
Rules for classification: 1) Points; 2) Head-to-head points; 3) Head-to-head goal difference; 4) Head-to-head goals scored; 5) Goal difference; 6) Goals scored; 7) Draw.
(H) Hosts

25 July 2024; 19:00	Hungary	28–31	France	Paris Expo Porte de Versailles, Paris; Attendance: 5,808; Referees: García, Paolantoni (ARG)
25 July 2024; 19:00	Kuczora 8	(12–15)	Nze Minko 6	Paris Expo Porte de Versailles, Paris; Attendance: 5,808; Referees: García, Paolantoni (ARG)
25 July 2024; 19:00	1× (suspension)	Report	1× (yellow card) 2× (suspension)	Paris Expo Porte de Versailles, Paris; Attendance: 5,808; Referees: García, Paolantoni (ARG)

28 July 2024; 09:00	Brazil	24–25	Hungary	Paris Expo Porte de Versailles, Paris; Attendance: 5,819; Referees: Jørum, Kleven (NOR)
28 July 2024; 09:00	three players 4	(15–12)	Simon 5	Paris Expo Porte de Versailles, Paris; Attendance: 5,819; Referees: Jørum, Kleven (NOR)
28 July 2024; 09:00	1× (yellow card) 2× (suspension)	Report	3× (suspension)	Paris Expo Porte de Versailles, Paris; Attendance: 5,819; Referees: Jørum, Kleven (NOR)

30 July 2024; 16:00	Hungary	31–31	Angola	Paris Expo Porte de Versailles, Paris; Attendance: 5,834; Referees: Kurtagic, Wetterwik (SWE)
30 July 2024; 16:00	Klujber 9	(15–16)	Kassoma 9	Paris Expo Porte de Versailles, Paris; Attendance: 5,834; Referees: Kurtagic, Wetterwik (SWE)
30 July 2024; 16:00	1× (yellow card) 2× (suspension)	Report	2× (suspension)	Paris Expo Porte de Versailles, Paris; Attendance: 5,834; Referees: Kurtagic, Wetterwik (SWE)

1 August 2024; 14:00	Spain	24–27	Hungary	Paris Expo Porte de Versailles, Paris; Attendance: 5,816; Referees: Kuttler, Merz (GER)
1 August 2024; 14:00	Cabral 6	(12–14)	Klujber 6	Paris Expo Porte de Versailles, Paris; Attendance: 5,816; Referees: Kuttler, Merz (GER)
1 August 2024; 14:00	1× (yellow card) 2× (suspension)	Report	3× (suspension)	Paris Expo Porte de Versailles, Paris; Attendance: 5,816; Referees: Kuttler, Merz (GER)

3 August 2024; 09:00	Hungary	26–30	Netherlands	Paris Expo Porte de Versailles, Paris; Attendance: 5,841; Referees: C. Bonaventura, J. Bonaventura (FRA)
3 August 2024; 09:00	Győri-Lukács, Klujber 5	(16–19)	Abbingh 7	Paris Expo Porte de Versailles, Paris; Attendance: 5,841; Referees: C. Bonaventura, J. Bonaventura (FRA)
3 August 2024; 09:00	1× (yellow card) 4× (suspension)	Report	3× (suspension)	Paris Expo Porte de Versailles, Paris; Attendance: 5,841; Referees: C. Bonaventura, J. Bonaventura (FRA)

Quarterfinal

6 August 2024
17:30
Hungary
32–36 (ET)
Sweden
Stade Pierre-Mauroy, Lille
Attendance: 22,408
Referees: A. Konjičanin, D. Konjičanin (BIH)
Klujber 11
(15–16)
Koppang 7
1× (yellow card) 3× (suspension)
Report
4× (suspension)

FT: 29–29 ET: 3–7

== Judo ==
Hungary entered seven judoka (four men and three women) into the Olympic tournament based on the International Judo Federation Olympics Individual Ranking.

Men

Athlete	Event	Round of 32	Round of 16	Quarterfinals	Semifinals	Repechage	Final / BM	
Athlete	Event	Opposition Result	Opposition Result	Opposition Result	Opposition Result	Opposition Result	Opposition Result	Rank
Bence Pongrácz	−66 kg	Alhassane (NIG); W 10–00	Abe (JPN); L 00–10	Did not advance				
Attila Ungvári	−81 kg	Zhubanazar (KAZ); W 01–00	Casse (BEL); L 00–10	Did not advance				
Krisztián Tóth	−90 kg	Creț (ROU); L 00–10	Did not advance					
Zsombor Vég	−100 kg	Kukolj (SRB); W 01–00	Sherazadishvili (ESP); L 01–10	Did not advance				

Women

Athlete	Event	Round of 32	Round of 16	Quarterfinals	Semifinals	Repechage	Final / BM	
Athlete	Event	Opposition Result	Opposition Result	Opposition Result	Opposition Result	Opposition Result	Opposition Result	Rank
Réka Pupp	–52 kg	Bye	Sosorbaram (MGL); W 10–0	Giuffrida (ITA); L 00–01	Did not advance	Primo (ISR); W 10–00	Buchard (FRA); L 00–01	5
Szofi Özbas	–63 kg	Zachová (CZE); W 01–00	Beauchemin-Pinard (CAN); L 00–10	Did not advance				
Szabina Gercsák	–70 kg	Coughlan (AUS); L 00–01	Did not advance					

Mixed

Athlete	Event	Round of 32	Round of 16	Quarterfinals	Semifinals	Repechage	Final / BM	
Athlete	Event	Opposition Result	Opposition Result	Opposition Result	Opposition Result	Opposition Result	Opposition Result	Rank
Réka Pupp; Szofi Özbas; Szabina Gercsák; Zsombor Vég; Bence Pongrácz; Krisztián Tóth	Team	Italy (ITA); L 1–4	Did not advance					

== Modern pentathlon ==
Hungarian modern pentathletes confirmed four quota places (two per gender) for Paris 2024. Tokyo 2020 Olympian Michelle Gulyás and rookie Csaba Bőhm secured a spot each in their respective individual events by finishing among the eight highest-ranked modern pentathletes eligible for qualification at the 2023 European Games in Kraków, Poland; meanwhile Balázs Szép and Blanka Guzi qualified for the games, by virtue of their medal results, at the 2024 UIPM World Championships in Zhengzhou, China.

Athlete	Event	Semifinal															Final														
Athlete	Event	Fencing (épée one touch)				Swimming (200 m freestyle)			Riding (show jumping)			Combined: shooting/running (10 m laser pistol)/(3000 m)			Total pts	Final rank	Fencing (épée one touch)				Swimming (200 m freestyle)			Riding (show jumping)			Combined: shooting/running (10 m laser pistol)/(3000 m)			Total pts	Final rank
Athlete	Event	RR	BR	Rank	MP pts	Time	Rank	MP pts	Penalties	Rank	MP pts	Time	Rank	MP pts	Total pts	Final rank	RR	BR	Rank	MP pts	Time	Rank	MP pts	Penalties	Rank	MP pts	Time	Rank	MP pts	Total pts	Final rank
Csaba Bőhm	Men's	13–22	4	14	194	1:59.50	2	311	0	2	300	10:04.64	4	696	1501	8 Q	13–22	0	18	190	1:58.94	3	313	14	15	286	9:44.87	3	716	1505	13
Balázs Szép	Men's	18–17	0	8	215	2:03.18	11	303	7	7	293	10:12.10	4	688	1499	7 Q	18–17	0	13	215	2:05.83	15	299	0	4	300	9:55.29	8	705	1519	10
Michelle Gulyás	Women's	24–11	2	2	247	2:10.39	2	290	14	16	286	12:06.06	11	574	1397	3 Q	24–11	0	2	245	2:12.44	4	286	0	1	300	11:10.01	7	630	1461 WR	1st place, gold medalist(s)
Blanka Guzi	Women's	15–20	0	15	200	2:16.93	9	277	0	5	300	11:20.80	2	620	1397	4 Q	15–20	0	17	200	2:16.25	7	278	0	8	300	10:45.48	1	655	1433	4

== Rowing ==
Hungary qualified one boat in the men's single sculls for the Games.

Athlete	Event	Heats		Repechage		Quarterfinals		Semifinals		Final	
Athlete	Event	Time	Rank	Time	Rank	Time	Rank	Time	Rank	Time	Rank
Bendegúz Pétervári-Molnár	Men's single sculls	6:58.76	3 QF	Bye		7:05.04	4 SFCD	6:56.92	2 QFC	6:47.81	16

Qualification Legend: FA=Final A (medal); FB=Final B (non-medal); FC=Final C (non-medal); FD=Final D (non-medal); FE=Final E (non-medal); FF=Final F (non-medal); SA/B=Semifinals A/B; SC/D=Semifinals C/D; SE/F=Semifinals E/F; QF=Quarterfinals; R=Repechage

== Sailing ==
Hungarian sailors qualified one boat in each of the following classes through the 2023 Sailing World Championships in The Hague, Netherlands.

Medal race events

Athlete	Event	Race											Net points	Final rank
Athlete	Event	1	2	3	4	5	6	7	8	9	10	M*	Net points	Final rank
Jonatán Vadnai	Men's Laser	16	12	~~21~~	13	5	12	8	12	—N/a		3	105	4
Mária Érdi	Women's Laser Radial	20	19	~~33~~	14	25	24	14	1	1	—N/a	EL	151	14

M = Medal race; EL = Eliminated – did not advance into the medal race

== Shooting ==
Hungarian shooters achieved quota places for the following events based on their results at the 2022 and 2023 ISSF World Championships, 2022, 2023, and 2024 European Championships, 2023 European Games, and 2024 ISSF World Olympic Qualification Tournament.

Men

Athlete	Event	Qualification		Final	
Athlete	Event	Points	Rank	Points	Rank
István Péni	10 m air rifle	628.3	18	Did not advance	
István Péni	50 m rifle 3 positions	587-28x	21	Did not advance	
Zalán Pekler	10 m air rifle	628.4	17	Did not advance	
Zalán Pekler	50 m rifle 3 positions	582-32x	32	Did not advance	

Women

Athlete	Event	Qualification		Final	
Athlete	Event	Points	Rank	Points	Rank
Eszter Mészáros	10 m air rifle	628.6	15	Did not advance	
Eszter Mészáros	50 m rifle 3 positions	577-29x	29	Did not advance	
Sára Ráhel Fábián	10 m air pistol	566	33	Did not advance	
Sára Ráhel Fábián	25 m pistol	582-17x	14	Did not advance	
Veronika Major	10 m air pistol	582	1 Q	114.0	8
Veronika Major	25 m pistol	592-27x	1 Q	31	3rd place, bronze medalist(s)

Mixed

Athlete	Event	Qualification		Final	
Athlete	Event	Points	Rank	Points	Rank
Eszter Mészáros; István Péni	10 m air rifle team	624.7	20	Did not advance	

== Swimming ==
Hungarian swimmers achieved the entry standards in the following events for Paris 2024 (a maximum of two swimmers under the Olympic Qualifying Time (OST) and potentially at the Olympic Consideration Time (OCT)):

Men

Athlete	Event	Heat		Semifinal		Final	
Athlete	Event	Time	Rank	Time	Rank	Time	Rank
Szebasztián Szabó	50 m freestyle	22.12	6	Did not advance			24
Nándor Németh	100 m freestyle	47.93	2 Q	47.61	2 Q	47.50	4
Zalán Sárkány	400 m freestyle	3:47.33	3	—N/a		Did not advance	14
Zalán Sárkány	800 m freestyle	7:48.90	3	—N/a		Did not advance	14
Zalán Sárkány	1500 m freestyle	14:52.42	5	—N/a		Did not advance	11
Dávid Betlehem	1500 m freestyle	14:45.59	3 Q	—N/a		14:40.91	4
Dávid Betlehem	10 km open water	—N/a				1:51:09.0	3rd place, bronze medalist(s)
Ádám Jászó	100 m backstroke	53.97	6	Did not advance			19
Ádám Telegdy	200 m backstroke	1:57.98	6 Q	1:57.58	7	Did not advance	13
Hubert Kós	100 m backstroke	52.78	1 Q	52.98	4	Did not advance	10
Hubert Kós	200 m backstroke	1:57.01	3 Q	1:55.93	1 Q	1:54.26	1st place, gold medalist(s)
Hubert Kós	100 m butterfly	51.58	4 Q	52.22	8	Did not advance	16
Richárd Márton	200 m butterfly	1:56.03	6 Q	1:55.93	7	Did not advance	14
Kristóf Milák	100 m butterfly	50.19	1 Q	50.38	1 Q	49.90	1st place, gold medalist(s)
Kristóf Milák	200 m butterfly	1:53.92	1 Q	1:52.72	1 Q	1:51.75	2nd place, silver medalist(s)
Gábor Zombori	200 m individual medley	DNS		Did not advance			
Gábor Zombori	400 m individual medley	4:14.88	7	—N/a		Did not advance	14
Balázs Holló	400 m individual medley	4:12.20	6	—N/a		Did not advance	9
Hubert Kós; Ádám Jászó; Nándor Németh; Szebasztián Szabó	4 × 100 m freestyle relay	3:12.96	7 QF	—N/a		3:13.11	
Kristóf Rasovszky	10 km open water	—N/a				1:50:52.7	1st place, gold medalist(s)

Women

Athlete	Event	Heat		Semifinal		Final	
Athlete	Event	Time	Rank	Time	Rank	Time	Rank
Petra Senánszky	50 m freestyle	25.21	8	Did not advance			24
Nikolett Pádár	200 m freestyle	DSQ		Did not advance			
Lilla Minna Ábrahám	200 m freestyle	1:57.77	13 Q	1:57.78	7	Did not advance	14
Ajna Késely	400 m freestyle	4:08.90	7	—N/a		Did not advance	13
Ajna Késely	800 m freestyle	8:36.13	6	—N/a		Did not advance	13
Vivien Jackl	1500 m freestyle	16:31.25	6	—N/a		Did not advance	15
Vivien Jackl	400 m individual medley	4:44.47	6	—N/a		Did not advance	14
Boglárka Kapás	200 m butterfly	2:09.28	5	2:09.23	6	Did not advance	14
Dóra Molnár	200 m backstroke	2:10.51	8 Q	2:09.83	7	Did not advance	12
Eszter Szabó-Feltóthy	200 m backstroke	2:09.72	3 Q	2:09.41	6	Did not advance	10
Dalma Sebestyén	200 m individual medley	2:15.16	8	Did not advance			25
Lilla Minna Ábrahám; Nikolett Pádár; Petra Senánszky; Panna Ugrai	4 × 100 m freestyle relay	3:37.33	6	—N/a		Did not advance	10
Lilla Minna Ábrahám; Ajna Késely; Nikolett Pádár; Panna Ugrai	4 × 200 m freestyle relay	7:52.25	2 Q	—N/a		7:50.52	6
Bettina Fábián	10 km open water	—N/a				2:04:16.9	5

== Table tennis ==
Hungary qualified one women single players and a mixed double pair team for the Games, through the release of the final mixed doubles ranking and singles final ranking for Paris 2024.

Athlete	Event	Preliminary	Round 1	Round 2	Round of 16	Quarterfinal	Semifinal	Final / BM	
Athlete	Event	Opposition Result	Opposition Result	Opposition Result	Opposition Result	Opposition Result	Opposition Result	Opposition Result	Rank
Georgina Póta	Women's singles	—N/a	Shan (GER); W 4–3	Shin (KOR); L 1–4	Did not advance				
Nándor Ecseki; Dóra Madarász	Mixed doubles	—N/a			Wong (HKG); Doo (HKG); L 1–4	Did not advance			

== Taekwondo ==
Hungary qualified three athletes to compete at the games. Tokyo 2020 Olympian, Omar Salim qualified for Paris 2024 by virtue of finishing within the top five in the Olympic rankings in his respective division. Joining the squad, Viviana Márton and Levente Józsa qualified for the Games after their semifinal victory, in their own division, at the 2024 European Olympic Qualification Tournament in Sofia, Bulgaria.

Athlete	Event	Round of 16	Quarterfinals	Semifinals	Repechage	Final / BM	
Athlete	Event	Opposition Result	Opposition Result	Opposition Result	Opposition Result	Opposition Result	Rank
Omar Salim	Men's −58 kg	Guzmán (ARG); W 2–1	Dell'Aquila (ITA); L 0–2	Did not advance			9
Levente Józsa	Men's −68 kg	Yushuai (CHN); L 1–2	Did not advance				
Viviana Márton	Women's −67 kg	Gbagbi (CIV); W 2–1	Teachout (USA); W 2–1	Chaâri (BEL); W 2–0	—N/a	Perišić (SRB); W 2–0	1st place, gold medalist(s)

== Tennis ==
Hungary qualified two tennis players to compete at the games.

Athlete	Event	Round of 64	Round of 32	Round of 16	Quarterfinal	Semifinal	Final / BM	
Athlete	Event	Opposition Result	Opposition Result	Opposition Result	Opposition Result	Opposition Result	Opposition Result	Rank
Márton Fucsovics	Men's singles	Nadal (ESP); L 1–6, 6–4, 4–6	Did not advance					
Fábián Marozsán	Men's singles	Humbert (FRA); L 3–6, 2–6	Did not advance					
Márton Fucsovics; Fábián Marozsán	Men's doubles	—N/a	Griekspoor / Koolhof (NED); L 2–6, 3–6	Did not advance				

== Triathlon ==
Hungary entered three triathletes (two men's and one women's) in the triathlon events for Paris, following the release of final individual olympics qualification ranking.

Individual

Athlete	Event	Time						Rank
Athlete	Event	Swim (1.5 km)	Trans 1	Bike (40 km)	Trans 2	Run (10 km)	Total	Rank
Bence Bicsák	Men's	20:55	0:54	51:35	0:29	31:21	1:45.14	16
Csongor Lehmann	Men's	21:19	0:48	51:16	0:21	30:43	1:44.27	11
Zsanett Bragmayer	Women's	22:34	0:56	58:15	0:27	38:12	2:00.24	26

== Water polo ==
Summary

Key:
- FT – After full time.
- P – Match decided by penalty-shootout.

Team	Event	Group stage						Quarterfinal	Semifinal	Final / BM	
Team	Event	Opposition Score	Opposition Score	Opposition Score	Opposition Score	Opposition Score	Rank	Opposition Score	Opposition Score	Opposition Score	Rank
Hungary men's	Men's tournament	France; W 13–12	Spain; L 7–10	Japan; W 17–10	Australia; L 8–9	Serbia; W 17–13	3 Q	Italy; W 12–10	Croatia; L 8–9	United States; L 8–11	4
Hungary women's	Women's tournament	Netherlands; L 8–10	Canada; W 12–7	China; W 17–11	Australia; L 12–14	—N/a	3 Q	United States; L 4–5	Did not advance		5

=== Men's tournament ===
Hungary men's national water polo team qualified for the Olympics by advancing to the final match and securing an outright berth at the 2023 World Aquatics Championships in Fukuoka, Japan.

Team roster

The roster was announced on 11 July 2024.

Head coach: Zsolt Varga

- 1 Soma Vogel GK
- 2 Dániel Angyal CB
- 3 Krisztián Manhercz W
- 4 Erik Molnár CB
- 5 Márton Vámos W
- 6 Ádám Nagy CB
- 7 Gergő Fekete D
- 8 Gergő Zalánki W
- 9 Vince Vigvári D
- 10 Dénes Varga W
- 11 Szilárd Jansik (c) D
- 12 Balázs Hárai CF
- 13 Márk Bányai GK

Group play

Pos	Team	Pld	W	PSW	PSL	L	GF	GA	GD	Pts	Qualification
1	Spain	5	5	0	0	0	67	39	+28	15	Quarterfinals
2	Australia	5	3	0	0	2	44	42	+2	9 (Note: Australia 9–8 Hungary)	Quarterfinals
3	Hungary	5	3	0	0	2	62	54	+8	9	Quarterfinals
4	Serbia	5	2	0	0	3	58	63	−5	6	Quarterfinals
5	France (H)	5	1	0	0	4	50	60	−10	3 (Note: France 14–13 Japan)	
6	Japan	5	1	0	0	4	60	83	−23	3	

Source: Olympics
Rules for classification: 1) Points; 2) Head-to-head points; 3) Head-to-head goal difference; 4) Head-to-head goals scored; 5) Goal difference.
(H) Host
Notes:

28 July 2024; 19:30 v	Report	France	12–13	Hungary	Paris Aquatic Centre, Paris; Referees: Adrian Alexandrescu (ROU), Andrej Franulović (CRO)
28 July 2024; 19:30 v	Report	Score by quarters: 1–5, 4–4, 2–1, 5–3			Paris Aquatic Centre, Paris; Referees: Adrian Alexandrescu (ROU), Andrej Franulović (CRO)
28 July 2024; 19:30 v	Report	Vernoux 4	Goals	Vigvári 3	Paris Aquatic Centre, Paris; Referees: Adrian Alexandrescu (ROU), Andrej Franulović (CRO)

30 July 2024; 21:05 v	Report	Spain	10–7	Hungary	Paris Aquatic Centre, Paris; Referees: Boris Margeta (SLO), Rafaele Colombo (ITA)
30 July 2024; 21:05 v	Report	Score by quarters: 2–1, 2–2, 4–3, 2–1			Paris Aquatic Centre, Paris; Referees: Boris Margeta (SLO), Rafaele Colombo (ITA)
30 July 2024; 21:05 v	Report	three players 2	Goals	Angyal 2	Paris Aquatic Centre, Paris; Referees: Boris Margeta (SLO), Rafaele Colombo (ITA)

1 August 2024; 21:05 v	Report	Hungary	17–10	Japan	Paris Aquatic Centre, Paris; Referees: Frank Ohme (GER), Zhang Liang (CHN)
1 August 2024; 21:05 v	Report	Score by quarters: 5–2, 4–2, 3–2, 5–4			Paris Aquatic Centre, Paris; Referees: Frank Ohme (GER), Zhang Liang (CHN)
1 August 2024; 21:05 v	Report	Vigvári 4	Goals	Watanabe 3	Paris Aquatic Centre, Paris; Referees: Frank Ohme (GER), Zhang Liang (CHN)

3 August 2024; 15:00 v	Report	Australia	9–8	Hungary	Paris Aquatic Centre, Paris; Referees: Georgios Stavridis (GRE), Veselin Mišković (MNE)
3 August 2024; 15:00 v	Report	Score by quarters: 2–2, 2–3, 2–2, 3–1			Paris Aquatic Centre, Paris; Referees: Georgios Stavridis (GRE), Veselin Mišković (MNE)
3 August 2024; 15:00 v	Report	Edwards, Maksimovic 2	Goals	Manhercz 4	Paris Aquatic Centre, Paris; Referees: Georgios Stavridis (GRE), Veselin Mišković (MNE)

5 August 2024; 12:00 v	Report	Hungary	17–13	Serbia	Paris La Défense Arena, Paris; Referees: Adrian Alexandrescu (ROU), Andrej Franulović (CRO)
5 August 2024; 12:00 v	Report	Score by quarters: 2–4, 7–3, 6–2, 2–4			Paris La Défense Arena, Paris; Referees: Adrian Alexandrescu (ROU), Andrej Franulović (CRO)
5 August 2024; 12:00 v	Report	Fekete, Zalánki 4	Goals	Mandić 5	Paris La Défense Arena, Paris; Referees: Adrian Alexandrescu (ROU), Andrej Franulović (CRO)

Quarterfinal

7 August 2024; 20:35 v	Report	Italy	10–12 (PSO)	Hungary	Paris La Défense Arena, Paris; Referees: Adrian Alexandrescu (ROU), Veselin Mišković (MNE)
7 August 2024; 20:35 v	Report	Score by quarters: 2–3, 0–1, 5–2, 2–3 PSO: 1–3			Paris La Défense Arena, Paris; Referees: Adrian Alexandrescu (ROU), Veselin Mišković (MNE)
7 August 2024; 20:35 v	Report	Di Fulvio, Echenique 3	Goals	Manhercz 4	Paris La Défense Arena, Paris; Referees: Adrian Alexandrescu (ROU), Veselin Mišković (MNE)

Semifinal

9 August 2024; 19:35 v	Report	Hungary	8–9	Croatia	Paris La Défense Arena, Paris; Referees: Frank Ohme (GER), David Gómez (ESP)
9 August 2024; 19:35 v	Report	Score by quarters: 3–3, 2–4, 2–2, 1–0			Paris La Défense Arena, Paris; Referees: Frank Ohme (GER), David Gómez (ESP)
9 August 2024; 19:35 v	Report	Jansik, Vámos 2	Goals	Fatović 5	Paris La Défense Arena, Paris; Referees: Frank Ohme (GER), David Gómez (ESP)

Bronze medal game

11 August 2024; 10:35 v	Report	United States	11–8 (PSO)	Hungary	Paris La Défense Arena, Paris; Referees: Sébastien Dervieux (FRA), David Gómez (ESP)
11 August 2024; 10:35 v	Report	Score by quarters: 3–2, 1–1, 2–2, 2–3 PSO: 3–0			Paris La Défense Arena, Paris; Referees: Sébastien Dervieux (FRA), David Gómez (ESP)
11 August 2024; 10:35 v	Report	Hallock 2	Goals	Varga, Zalánki 2	Paris La Défense Arena, Paris; Referees: Sébastien Dervieux (FRA), David Gómez (ESP)

=== Women's tournament ===
Hungary women's national water polo team qualified for the Olympics by securing an outright berth at the 2024 World Aquatics Championships in Doha, Qatar.

Team roster

The roster was announced on 6 July 2024.

Head coach: Attila Mihók

- 1 Alda Magyari GK
- 2 Dorottya Szilágyi W
- 3 Vanda Vályi W
- 4 Gréta Gurisatti W
- 5 Geraldine Mahieu CF
- 6 Rebecca Parkes CF
- 7 Brigitta Horváth W
- 8 Rita Keszthelyi (c) D
- 9 Dóra Leimeter W
- 10 Natasa Rybanska CB
- 11 Kamilla Faragó W
- 12 Krisztina Garda CB
- 13 Boglárka Neszmély GK

Group play

Pos	Team	Pld	W	PSW	PSL	L	GF	GA	GD	Pts	Qualification
1	Australia	4	2	2	0	0	33	28	+5	10 (Note: Netherlands 14–15 Australia)	Quarterfinals
2	Netherlands	4	3	0	1	0	52	37	+15	10	Quarterfinals
3	Hungary	4	2	0	1	1	46	37	+9	7	Quarterfinals
4	Canada	4	1	0	0	3	37	49	−12	3	Quarterfinals
5	China	4	0	0	0	4	34	51	−17	0	

Source: Olympics
Rules for classification: 1) Points; 2) Head-to-head points; 3) Head-to-head goal difference; 4) Head-to-head goals scored; 5) Goal difference.
Notes:

27 July 2024; 14:00 v	Report	Netherlands	10–8	Hungary	Paris Aquatic Centre, Paris; Referees: Alessia Ferrari (ITA), Sébastien Dervieux (FRA)
27 July 2024; 14:00 v	Report	Score by quarters: 4–2, 0–1, 2–3, 4–2			Paris Aquatic Centre, Paris; Referees: Alessia Ferrari (ITA), Sébastien Dervieux (FRA)
27 July 2024; 14:00 v	Report	B. Rogge 3	Goals	Vályi 3	Paris Aquatic Centre, Paris; Referees: Alessia Ferrari (ITA), Sébastien Dervieux (FRA)

29 July 2024; 20:05 v	Report	Hungary	12–7	Canada	Paris Aquatic Centre, Paris; Referees: Natalia Markopoulou (GRE), Marta Cabañas (ESP)
29 July 2024; 20:05 v	Report	Score by quarters: 4–1, 3–3, 1–1, 4–2			Paris Aquatic Centre, Paris; Referees: Natalia Markopoulou (GRE), Marta Cabañas (ESP)
29 July 2024; 20:05 v	Report	Gurisatti, Keszthelyi 3	Goals	three players 2	Paris Aquatic Centre, Paris; Referees: Natalia Markopoulou (GRE), Marta Cabañas (ESP)

2 August 2024; 20:05 v	Report	China	11–17	Hungary	Paris Aquatic Centre, Paris; Referees: Marta Cabañas (ESP), Aurélie Blanchard (FRA)
2 August 2024; 20:05 v	Report	Score by quarters: 4–3, 3–5, 2–4, 2–5			Paris Aquatic Centre, Paris; Referees: Marta Cabañas (ESP), Aurélie Blanchard (FRA)
2 August 2024; 20:05 v	Report	Deng, Lu 3	Goals	Keszthelyi 7	Paris Aquatic Centre, Paris; Referees: Marta Cabañas (ESP), Aurélie Blanchard (FRA)

4 August 2024; 14:00 v	Report	Hungary	12–14 (PSO)	Australia	Paris Aquatic Centre, Paris; Referees: Marta Cabañas (ESP), Adrian Alexandrescu (ROU)
4 August 2024; 14:00 v	Report	Score by quarters: 1–1, 2–2, 2–3, 4–3 PSO: 3–5			Paris Aquatic Centre, Paris; Referees: Marta Cabañas (ESP), Adrian Alexandrescu (ROU)
4 August 2024; 14:00 v	Report	Keszthelyi, Szilágyi 2	Goals	Williams 4	Paris Aquatic Centre, Paris; Referees: Marta Cabañas (ESP), Adrian Alexandrescu (ROU)

Quarterfinal

6 August 2024; 20:35 v	Report	Hungary	4–5	United States	Paris La Défense Arena, Paris; Referees: Vojin Putniković (SRB), Zhang Liang (CHN)
6 August 2024; 20:35 v	Report	Score by quarters: 2–1, 0–2, 2–1, 0–1			Paris La Défense Arena, Paris; Referees: Vojin Putniković (SRB), Zhang Liang (CHN)
6 August 2024; 20:35 v	Report	four players 1	Goals	Steffens 2	Paris La Défense Arena, Paris; Referees: Vojin Putniković (SRB), Zhang Liang (CHN)

5–8th place semifinal

8 August 2024; 18:00 v	Report	Greece	9–12	Hungary	Paris La Défense Arena, Paris; Referees: Marta Cabañas (ESP), Michiel Zwart (NED)
8 August 2024; 18:00 v	Report	Score by quarters: 2–1, 2–3, 3–4, 2–4			Paris La Défense Arena, Paris; Referees: Marta Cabañas (ESP), Michiel Zwart (NED)
8 August 2024; 18:00 v	Report	three players 2	Goals	Keszthelyi 4	Paris La Défense Arena, Paris; Referees: Marta Cabañas (ESP), Michiel Zwart (NED)

Fifth place gane

10 August 2024; 14:00 v	Report	Hungary	15–12 (PSO)	Italy	Paris La Défense Arena, Paris; Referees: Natalia Markopoulou (GRE), Hélène Painchaud (CAN)
10 August 2024; 14:00 v	Report	Score by quarters: 3–3, 5–4, 0–2, 3–2 PSO: 4–1			Paris La Défense Arena, Paris; Referees: Natalia Markopoulou (GRE), Hélène Painchaud (CAN)
10 August 2024; 14:00 v	Report	Gurisatti 3	Goals	Bianconi, Marletta 3	Paris La Défense Arena, Paris; Referees: Natalia Markopoulou (GRE), Hélène Painchaud (CAN)

== Wrestling ==
Hungary qualified five wrestlers for each of the following classes into the Olympic competition. Ismail Musukaev and Dávid Losonczi qualified for the games by virtue of top five results through the 2023 World Championships in Belgrade, Serbia; Bernadett Nagy earned her quota place by reaching the final of the 2024 European Wrestling Olympic Qualification Tournament in Baku, Azerbaijan; meanwhile Zoltán Lévai and Dániel Ligeti qualified for the games through the 2024 World Qualification Tournament in Istanbul, Turkey.

Key:

- VT (ranking points: 5–0 or 0–5) – Victory by fall.
- VB (ranking points: 5–0 or 0–5) – Victory by injury (VF for forfeit, VA for withdrawal or disqualification)
- PP (ranking points: 3–1 or 1–3) – Decision by points – the loser with technical points.
- PO (ranking points: 3–0 or 0–3) – Decision by points – the loser without technical points.
- ST (ranking points: 4–0 or 0–4) – Great superiority – the loser without technical points and a margin of victory of at least 8 (Greco-Roman) or 10 (freestyle) points.
- SP (ranking points: 4–1 or 1–4) – Technical superiority – the loser with technical points and a margin of victory of at least 8 (Greco-Roman) or 10 (freestyle) points.

Freestyle

Athlete	Event	Round of 16	Quarterfinal	Semifinal	Repechage	Final / BM	
Athlete	Event	Opposition Result	Opposition Result	Opposition Result	Opposition Result	Opposition Result	Rank
Ismail Musukaev	Men's 65 kg	Akmataliev (KGZ); W 11–0	Aliyev (AZE); W 10–3	Amouzad (IRI); L 0–10	–	Dudaev (ALB); L 12–13	5
Dániel Ligeti	Men's 125 kg	Mutuwa (NGR); W 11–0	Akgül (TUR); L 0–8	Did not advance			
Bernadett Nagy	Women's 76 kg	Hooda (IND); L 2–12	Did not advance				

Men's Greco-Roman

Athlete	Event	Round of 16	Quarterfinal	Semifinal	Repechage	Final / BM	
Athlete	Event	Opposition Result	Opposition Result	Opposition Result	Opposition Result	Opposition Result	Rank
Zoltán Lévai	Men's 77 kg	Akbudak (TUR); W 2–1	Suleymenov (AZE); L 1–1	Did not advance			
Dávid Losonczi	Men's 87 kg	Huseynov (AZE); W 5–2	Komarov (SRB); W 2–2	Novikov (BUL); L 1–3	—N/a	Bisultanov (DEN); L 1–2	5

== See also ==
- Hungary at the 2024 Summer Paralympics
