= 2025 ICF Canoe Sprint World Championships – Women's C-2 500 metres =

Women's C-2 500 metres at the 2025 ICF Canoe Sprint World Championships
- Venue: Idroscalo Regatta Course
- Location: Milan, Italy
- Dates: 20–22 August
- Competitors: 36 from 18 nations
- Winning time: 1:53.30

Medalists
gold medal	Liudmyla Luzan; Iryna Fedoriv	Ukraine
silver medal	Zoe Wojtyk; Katie Vincent	Canada
bronze medal	Angels Moreno; Viktoriia Yarchevska	Spain

The women's C-2 500 metres competition at the 2025 ICF Canoe Sprint World Championships in Milan took place in Idroscalo Regatta Course.

== Schedule ==
The schedule is as follows:

Date	Time	Round
Wednesday 20 August 2025	10:00	Heats
Thursday 21 August 2025	13:48	Semifinals
Friday 22 August 2025	14:43	Final B
Friday 22 August 2025	15:25	Final A

== Results ==
=== Heats ===
The fastest boat in each heat advanced directly to the final (FA). The next six fastest boats in each heat advanced to the semifinal (QS).

==== Heat 1 ====
Rank	Canoeist	Country	Time	Notes
1	Zoe Wojtyk; Katie Vincent	Canada	1:58.21	FA
2	Liudmyla Luzan; Iryna Fedoriv	Ukraine	1:58.33	QS
3	Ágnes Kiss; Bianka Nagy	Hungary	1:58.55	QS
4	Sylwia Szczerbińska; Dorota Borowska	Poland	2:03.83	QS
5	Anhelina Bardanouskaya; Volha Klimava	Individual Neutral Athletes	2:04.31	QS
6	Madison Velásquez; Manuela Gómez	Colombia	2:09.20	QS
	Lealyn Baligasa; Joanna Barca	Philippines	DNS	

==== Heat 2 ====
Rank	Canoeist	Country	Time	Notes
1	Sun Mengya; Ma Yanan	China	2:00.12	FA
2	Daniela Cociu; Maria Olărașu	Moldova	2:00.23	QS
3	Audrey Harper; Andreea Ghizila	United States	2:02.80	QS
4	Denisa Řáhová; Kamila Šímová	Czech Republic	2:06.77	QS
5	Barbara Jara; Karen Roco	Chile	2:08.88	QS
6	Megha Pradeep; Neha Devi Leichonbam	India	2:15.72	QS

==== Heat 3 ====
Rank	Canoeist	Country	Time	Notes
1	Angels Moreno; Viktoriia Yarchevska	Spain	2:00.38	FA
2	Shokhsanam Sherzodova; Nilufar Zokirova	Uzbekistan	2:02.50	QS
3	Beatriz Fernandes; Inês Penetra	Portugal	2:03.31	QS
4	Herlin Aprilia Lali; Sella Monim	Indonesia	2:06.08	QS
5	Maike Jakob; Hedi Kliemke	Germany	2:07.33	QS
6	Marina Gureeva; Ekaterina Shliapnikova	Individual Neutral Athletes	2:07.61	QS

=== Semifinals ===
The fastest three boats in each semi advanced to the A final. The next four fastest boats in each semi and best 8th advanced to the final B.

==== Semifinal 1 ====
Rank	Canoeist	Country	Time	Notes
1	Anhelina Bardanouskaya; Volha Klimava	Individual Neutral Athletes	1:58.98	FA
2	Ágnes Kiss; Bianka Nagy	Hungary	1:59.01	FA
3	Audrey Harper; Andreea Ghizila	United States	1:59.51	FA
4	Shokhsanam Sherzodova; Nilufar Zokirova	Uzbekistan	2:00.09	FB
5	Denisa Řáhová; Kamila Šímová	Czech Republic	2:01.56	FB
6	Madison Velásquez; Manuela Gómez	Colombia	2:02.93	FB
7	Herlin Aprilia Lali; Sella Monim	Indonesia	2:05.45	FB
8	Megha Pradeep; Neha Devi Leichonbam	India	2:13.19	fB

==== Semifinal 2 ====
Rank	Canoeist	Country	Time	Notes
1	Liudmyla Luzan; Iryna Fedoriv	Ukraine	1:57.50	FA
2	Beatriz Fernandes; Inês Penetra	Portugal	1:59.58	FA
3	Daniela Cociu; Maria Olărașu	Moldova	1:59.65	FA
4	Sylwia Szczerbińska; Dorota Borowska	Poland	2:00.70	FB
5	Marina Gureeva; Ekaterina Shliapnikova	Individual Neutral Athletes	2:00.71	FB
6	Maike Jakob; Hedi Kliemke	Germany	2:04.37	FB
7	Barbara Jara; Karen Roco	Chile	2:07.21	FB

=== Finals ===
==== Final B ====
Competitors in this final raced for positions 10 to 18.

Rank	Canoeist	Country	Time	Notes
1	Sylwia Szczerbińska; Dorota Borowska	Poland	1:57.39	
2	Shokhsanam Sherzodova; Nilufar Zokirova	Uzbekistan	1:58.38	
3	Maike Jakob; Hedi Kliemke	Germany	2:00.17	
4	Marina Gureeva; Ekaterina Shliapnikova	Individual Neutral Athletes	2:00.26	
5	Madison Velásquez; Manuela Gómez	Colombia	2:00.87	
6	Denisa Řáhová; Kamila Šímová	Czech Republic	2:01.19	
7	Herlin Aprilia Lali; Sella Monim	Indonesia	2:01.62	
7	Megha Pradeep; Neha Devi Leichonbam	India	2:01.62	
8	Barbara Jara; Karen Roco	Chile	2:03.73	

==== Final A ====
Competitors raced for positions 1 to 9, with medals going to the top three.

Rank	Canoeist	Country	Time	Notes
1st place, gold medalist(s)	Liudmyla Luzan; Iryna Fedoriv	Ukraine	1:53.30	
2nd place, silver medalist(s)	Zoe Wojtyk; Katie Vincent	Canada	1:54.36	
3rd place, bronze medalist(s)	Angels Moreno; Viktoriia Yarchevska	Spain	1:54.84	
4	Anhelina Bardanouskaya; Volha Klimava	Individual Neutral Athletes	1:55.08	
5	Ágnes Kiss; Bianka Nagy	Hungary	1:55.11	
6	Daniela Cociu; Maria Olărașu	Moldova	1:56.28	
7	Sun Mengya; Ma Yanan	China	1:56.61	
8	Audrey Harper; Andreea Ghizila	United States	1:56.86	
9	Beatriz Fernandes; Inês Penetra	Portugal	1:58.19	
