= 2026 ICF Canoe Sprint World Championships – Women's C-1 5000 metres =

Women's C-1 5000 metres at the 2026 ICF Canoe Sprint World Championships
- Venue: Lake Malta
- Location: Poznań, Poland
- Dates: 30 August
- Competitors: 18 from 18 nations
- Winning time: 31:15.19

Medalists
gold medal	Carlotta Loske	Germany
silver medal	Zsófia Csorba	Hungary
bronze medal	Maryia Papichych	Individual Neutral Athletes

The women's C-1 5000 metres competition at the 2026 ICF Canoe Sprint World Championships in Poznań, Poland took place 30 August 2026.

== Records ==
The world best time in the C-1 5000 metres for women at the beginning of the competition was as follows:

Women's C-1 5000 metres
World Best	25:00.82	Laurence Vincent Lapointe (CAN)	Duisburg (Germany)

== Schedule ==
The schedule is as follows:

Date	Time	Round
Sunday 30 August 2026	14:04	Final

== Results ==
As a long-distance event, it was held as a direct final.

=== Final ===
Rank	Lane	Name(s)	Nation	Time	Behind	Notes
1st place, gold medalist(s)	15	Carlotta Loske	Germany	31:15.19		
2nd place, silver medalist(s)	10	Zsófia Csorba	Hungary	31:45.85	+30.66	
3rd place, bronze medalist(s)	3	Maryia Papichych	Neutral Athletes B	31:47.48	+32.29	
4	11	María Mailliard	Chile	31:54.38	+39.19	
5	5	Chloé Nicot	France	32:20.65	+1:05.46	
6	14	Valeriia Tereta	Ukraine	32:25.51	+1:10.32	
7	12	Denisa Řáhová	Czech Republic	32:34.17	+1:18.98	
8	13	Elena Glizan	Moldova	32:41.15	+1:25.96	
9	8	Teng Anshuo	China	32:44.97	+1:29.78	
10	9	Katie Vincent	Canada	33:03.90	+1:48.71	
11	7	Bethany Gill	Great Britain	33:11.99	+1:56.80	
12	1	Nerea Novo	Spain	34:10.29	+2:55.10	
13	19	Ewelina Antos	Poland	34:19.50	+3:04.31	
14	3	Hermínia Teixeira	São Tomé and Príncipe	1 LAP		
15	18	Johana Ariana Padilla Rivera	Peru	2 LAP		
16	17	Chanez Slimane	Algeria	3 LAP		
	16	Madison Velásquez	Colombia	DNF		
	2	Mame Thiane Diarra	Senegal	DSQ		
	6	Shokhsanam Sherzodova	Uzbekistan	DNS		
