= 2025 ICF Canoe Sprint World Championships – Women's C-4 500 metres =

Women's C-4 500 metres at the 2025 ICF Canoe Sprint World Championships
- Venue: Idroscalo Regatta Course
- Location: Milan, Italy
- Dates: 24 August
- Competitors: 36 from 9 nations
- Winning time: 1:46.43

Medalists
gold medal	Ágnes Kiss; Bianka Nagy; Réka Opavszky; Zsófia Csorba	Hungary
silver medal	Viktoryia Nestsiarenka; Anhelina Bardanouskaya; Volha Klimava; Lizaveta Prymak	Individual Neutral Athletes
bronze medal	Jiang Xina; Teng Anshuo; Sun Mengya; Ma Yanan	China

The women's C-4 500 metres competition at the 2025 ICF Canoe Sprint World Championships in Milan took place in Idroscalo Regatta Course.

== Schedule ==
The schedule is as follows:

Date	Time	Round
Sunday 24 August 2025	11:08	Final

== Results ==
=== Final ===
Competitors raced for positions 1 to 9, with medals going to the top three.

Rank	Canoeist	Country	Time	Notes
1st place, gold medalist(s)	Ágnes Kiss; Bianka Nagy; Réka Opavszky; Zsófia Csorba	Hungary	1:46.43	
2nd place, silver medalist(s)	Viktoryia Nestsiarenka; Anhelina Bardanouskaya; Volha Klimava; Lizaveta Prymak	Individual Neutral Athletes	1:47.48	
3rd place, bronze medalist(s)	Jiang Xina; Teng Anshuo; Sun Mengya; Ma Yanan	China	1:47.50	
4	Claudia Couto; Valéria Oliveira; Ana Cantero; María Corbera	Spain	1:49.85	
5	Zoe Wojtyk; Sophia Jensen; Sloan MacKenzie; Evie McDonald	Canada	1:49.90	
6	Shokhsanam Sherzodova; Nilufar Zokirova; Zarina Rustamova; Khonzoda Erkinova	Uzbekistan	1:51.58	
7	Valeriia Tereta; Anastasiia Dezhytska; Mariia Yatsenko; Iryna Fedoriv	Ukraine	1:54.11	
8	Sofiia Shtil; Alina Kovaleva; Marina Gureeva; Daria Kharchenko	Individual Neutral Athletes	1:54.34	
9	Megha Pradeep; Neha Devi Leichonbam; Kaveri Kaveri; Shivani Verma	India	2:03.26	
