= 2023 ICF Canoe Sprint World Championships – Women's C-2 500 metres =

Women's C-2 500 metres at the 2023 ICF Canoe Sprint World Championships
- Venue: Sportpark Duisburg
- Location: Duisburg, Germany
- Dates: 23–26 August
- Competitors: 50 from 25 nations
- Winning time: 1:52.775

Medalists
gold medal	Xu Shixiao; Sun Mengya	China
silver medal	Antía Jácome; María Corbera	Spain
bronze medal	Sloan MacKenzie; Katie Vincent	Canada

The women's C-2 500 metres competition at the 2023 ICF Canoe Sprint World Championships in Duisburg took place in Sportpark Duisburg.

== Schedule ==
The schedule is as follows:

Date	Time	Round
Wednesday 23 August 2023	14:35	Heats
Thursday 24 August 2023	14:20	Semifinals
Saturday 26 August 2023	09:10	Final B
Saturday 26 August 2023	12:30	Final A

== Results ==
=== Heats ===
The fastest six boats in each heat, plus the fastest three remaining boats, advanced to the semi-finals.

==== Heat 1 ====
Rank	Canoeist	Country	Time	Notes
1	Sloan MacKenzie; Katie Vincent	Canada	1:57.586	QS
2	Giada Bragato; Bianka Nagy	Hungary	2:00.036	QS
3	Axelle Renard; Eugénie Dorange	France	2:01.556	QS
4	Yarisleidis Cirilo; Yinnoly Lopez Lamadrid	Cuba	2:01.727	QS
5	Bethany Gill; Katie Reid	Great Britain	2:05.711	QS
6	Kaveri Dimar; Shivani Verma	India	2:11.593	QS
7	Maoli Angulo; Anggie Avegno	Ecuador	2:13.676	QS

==== Heat 2 ====
Rank	Canoeist	Country	Time	Notes
1	Xu Shixiao; Sun Mengya	China	1:59.913	QS
2	Daniela Cociu; Maria Olărașu	Moldova	2:00.996	QS
3	Margarita Torlopova; Ulyana Kisseleva	Kazakhstan	2:02.681	QS
4	Riska Andriyani; Nurmeni Nurmeni	Indonesia	2:05.386	QS
5	Inês Penetra; Beatriz Fernandes	Portugal	1:45.317	QS
6	Maede Shoorgashti; Hiva Afzali	Iran	2:08.110	QS

==== Heat 3 ====
Rank	Canoeist	Country	Time	Notes
1	Antía Jácome; María Corbera	Spain	1:38.973	QS
2	Sylwia Szczerbińska; Katarzyna Szperkiewicz	Poland	2:02.352	QS
3	Karen Roco; María Mailliard	Chile	2:04.872	QS
4	Yurely Marin; Madison Velásquez	Colombia	2:06.806	QS
5	Gulbakhor Fayzieva; Nilufar Zokirova	Uzbekistan	2:07.114	QS
6	Azusa Murphy; Andreea Ghizila	United States	2:08.769	QS

==== Heat 4 ====
Rank	Canoeist	Country	Time	Notes
1	Liudmyla Luzan; Valeriia Tereta	Ukraine	1:58.732	QS
2	Lisa Jahn; Hedi Kliemke	Germany	1:59.854	QS
3	Orasa Thiangkathok; Aphinya Sroichit	Thailand	2:03.418	QS
4	Nguyen Hong Thai; Nguyễn Thị Hương	Vietnam	2:03.743	QS
5	Kamila Šímová; Martina Malíková	Czech Republic	2:04.667	QS
6	Megumi Tsubota; Mio Kobayashi	Japan	2:08.972	QS

=== Semifinal ===
The fastest three boats in each semi advanced to the A final.
The next three fastest boats in each semi advanced to the final B.

==== Semifinal 1 ====
Rank	Canoeist	Country	Time	Notes
1	Sloan MacKenzie; Katie Vincent	Canada	1:53.111	QA
2	Daniela Cociu; Maria Olărașu	Moldova	1:54.828	QA
3	Sylwia Szczerbińska; Katarzyna Szperkiewicz	Poland	1:55.411	QA
4	Maede Shoorgashti; Hiva Afzali	Iran	1:59.734	QB
5	Nguyen Hong Thai; Nguyễn Thị Hương	Vietnam	2:00.329	QB
6	Bethany Gill; Katie Reid	Great Britain	2:00.697	QB
7	Orasa Thiangkathok; Aphinya Sroichit	Thailand	2:00.701	
8	Gulbakhor Fayzieva; Nilufar Zokirova	Uzbekistan	2:01.252	
9	Maoli Angulo; Anggie Avegno	Ecuador	02:03.305	

==== Semifinal 2 ====
Rank	Canoeist	Country	Time	Notes
1	Xu Shixiao; Sun Mengya	China	1:52.250	QA
2	Yarisleidis Cirilo; Yinnoly Lopez Lamadrid	Cuba	1:54.495	QA
3	Lisa Jahn; Hedi Kliemke	Germany	1:54.591	QA
4	Axelle Renard; Eugénie Dorange	France	1:56.955	QB
5	Inês Penetra; Beatriz Fernandes	Portugal	1:58.436	QB
6	Yurely Marin; Madison Velásquez	Colombia	2:00.960	QB
7	Karen Roco; María Mailliard	Chile	2:01.976	
8	Megumi Tsubota; Mio Kobayashi	Japan	2:06.974	

==== Semifinal 3 ====
Rank	Canoeist	Country	Time	Notes
1	Antía Jácome; María Corbera	Spain	1:54.498	QA
2	Giada Bragato; Bianka Nagy	Hungary	1:56.029	QA
3	Liudmyla Luzan; Valeriia Tereta	Ukraine	1:56.494	QA
4	Margarita Torlopova; Ulyana Kisseleva	Kazakhstan	1:59.732	QB
5	Riska Andriyani; Nurmeni Nurmeni	Indonesia	2:01.094	QB
6	Kamila Šímová; Martina Malíková	Czech Republic	2:01.239	QB
7	Azusa Murphy; Andreea Ghizila	United States	2:02.376	
8	Kaveri Dimar; Shivani Verma	India	2:09.868	

=== Finals ===
==== Final B ====
Competitors in this final raced for positions 10 to 18.

Rank	Canoeist	Country	Time
1	Axelle Renard; Eugénie Dorange	France	1:58.961
2	Margarita Torlopova; Ulyana Kisseleva	Kazakhstan	2:00.431
3	Inês Penetra; Beatriz Fernandes	Portugal	2:00.567
4	Nguyen Hong Thai; Nguyễn Thị Hương	Vietnam	2:02.559
5	Maede Shoorgashti; Hiva Afzali	Iran	2:02.912
6	Bethany Gill; Katie Reid	Great Britain	2:03.049
7	Yurely Marin; Madison Velásquez	Colombia	2:03.263
8	Kamila Šímová; Martina Malíková	Czech Republic	2:04.126
9	Riska Andriyani; Nurmeni Nurmeni	Indonesia	2:04.137

==== Final A ====
Competitors raced for positions 1 to 9, with medals going to the top three.

Rank	Canoeist	Country	Time
1st place, gold medalist(s)	Xu Shixiao; Sun Mengya	China	1:52.775
2nd place, silver medalist(s)	Antía Jácome; María Corbera	Spain	1:52.916
3rd place, bronze medalist(s)	Sloan MacKenzie; Katie Vincent	Canada	1:52.956
4	Lisa Jahn; Hedi Kliemke	Germany	1:55.543
5	Giada Bragato; Bianka Nagy	Hungary	1:55.976
6	Yarisleidis Cirilo; Yinnoly Lopez Lamadrid	Cuba	1:56.185
7	Daniela Cociu; Maria Olărașu	Moldova	1:56.895
8	Liudmyla Luzan; Valeriia Tereta	Ukraine	1:56.987
9	Sylwia Szczerbińska; Katarzyna Szperkiewicz	Poland	1:57.920
