= 2025 Canoe Sprint European Championships =

International canoeing and kayaking event

- Venue: Labe Aréna Račice
- Location: Račice, Czech Republic
- Dates: 19–22 June

The 2025 Canoe Sprint European Championships (35th) was held from 19 to 22 June 2025 in Račice, Czech Republic.

== Canoe sprint ==
=== Medal table ===
* Host nation (Czech Republic)

Rank	Nation	Gold	Silver	Bronze	Total
1	Hungary	7	3	5	15
2	Spain	4	4	4	12
3	Portugal	3	1	0	4
4	Poland	2	3	1	6
5	Czech Republic*	1	3	1	5
5	Ukraine	1	3	1	5
7	Moldova	1	1	3	5
8	Italy	1	1	2	4
9	Germany	1	1	1	3
10	Serbia	1	0	2	3
11	Romania	1	0	1	2
12	Sweden	0	2	1	3
13	Slovenia	0	1	0	1
14	Denmark	0	0	1	1
Totals (14 entries)		23	23	23	69

Source: Medal Table

=== Men ===
Event	Gold		Silver		Bronze	
C-1 200 m	Pablo Graña; Spain	38.291	Oleksii Koliadych; Poland	38.338 (+0.047)	Andrii Rybachok; Ukraine	38.544 (+0.253)
C-1 500 m	Martin Fuksa; Czech Republic	1:47.733	Serghei Tarnovschi; Moldova	1:49.280 (+1.547)	Cătălin Chirilă; Romania	1:49.313 (+1.580)
C-1 1000 m	Cătălin Chirilă; Romania	3:46.781	Martin Fuksa; Czech Republic	3:46.838 (+0.057)	Serghei Tarnovschi; Moldova	3:49.128 (+2.347)
C-1 5000 m	Serghei Tarnovschi; Moldova	23:29.537	Wiktor Głazunow; Poland	23:30.538 (+1.001)	Carlo Tacchini; Italy	23:38.796 (+9.259)
C-2 500 m	Gabriele Casadei; Carlo Tacchini; Italy	1:36.058	Daniel Grijalba; Adrián Sieiro; Spain	1:36.148 (+0.090)	Kristóf Kollár; István Juhász; Hungary	1:36.978 (+0.920)
K-1 200 m	Strahinja Dragosavljević; Serbia	34.138	Messias Baptista; Portugal	34.174 (+0.036)	Carlos Arévalo; Spain	34.554 (+0.416)
K-1 500 m	Ádám Varga; Hungary	1:37.455	Alex Graneri; Spain	1:38.242 (+0.787)	Josef Dostál; Czech Republic	1:38.322 (+0.867)
K-1 1000 m	Fernando Pimenta; Portugal	3:25.096	Martin Nathell; Sweden	3:26.009 (+0.913)	Bálint Kopasz; Hungary	3:26.019 (+0.923)
K-1 5000 m	Fernando Pimenta; Portugal	21:14.874	Ádám Varga; Hungary	21:15.984 (+1.110)	Mads Pedersen; Denmark	21:17.760 (+2.886)
K-2 500 m	Jacob Schopf; Max Lemke; Germany	1:27.107	Jakub Špicar; Daniel Havel; Czech Republic	1:27.340 (+0.233)	Samuele Burgo; Tommaso Freschi; Lithuania	1:27.430 (+0.323)
K-4 500 m	Gustavo Gonçalves; João Ribeiro; Messias Baptista; Pedro Casinha; Portugal	1:19.319	Michal Kulich; Daniel Havel; Jakub Špicar; Radek Šlouf; Czech Republic	1:19.532 (+0.213)	Jakub Stepun; Valerii Vichev; Sławomir Witczak; Jaroslaw Kajdanek; Poland	1:19.642 (+0.323)

=== Women ===
Event	Gold		Silver		Bronze	
C-1 200 m	Dorota Borowska; Poland	45.178	Liudmyla Luzan; Ukraine	45.658 (+0.480)	Viktoriia Yarchevska; Spain	45.781 (+0.603)
C-1 500 m	Liudmyla Luzan; Ukraine	2:06.807	Réka Opavszky; Hungary	2:08.793 (+1.986)	María Corbera; Spain	2:11.004 (+4.197)
C-1 5000 m	Zsófia Csorba; Hungary	26:55.664	María Corbera; Spain	26:58.526 (+2.862)	Daniela Cociu; Moldova	27:11.617 (+5.953)
C-2 200 m	Angels Moreno; Viktoriia Yarchevska; Spain	42.242	Liudmyla Luzan; Iryna Fedoriv; Ukraine	42.309 (+0.067)	Ágnes Kiss; Bianka Nagy; Hungary	42.856 (+0.614)
C-2 500 m	Angels Moreno; Viktoriia Yarchevska; Spain	1:55.543	Liudmyla Luzan; Iryna Fedoriv; Ukraine	1:56.456 (+0.913)	Ágnes Kiss; Bianka Nagy; Hungary	1:57.163 (+1.620)
K-1 200 m	Anna Lucz; Hungary	39.715	Anja Osterman; Slovenia	39.905 (+0.190)	Milica Novaković; Serbia	40.155 (+0.440)
K-1 500 m	Zsóka Csikós; Hungary	1:47.902	Anna Puławska; Poland	1:48.636 (+0.734)	Milica Novaković; Serbia	1:49.939 (+2.037)
K-1 1000 m	Zsóka Csikós; Hungary	3:50.294	Melina Andersson; Sweden	3:54.321 (+4.027)	Laura Pedruelo; Spain	3:55.841 (+5.547)
K-1 5000 m	Zsóka Csikós; Hungary	23:39.685	Susanna Cicali; Italy	23:40.471 (+0.786)	Melina Andersson; Sweden	23:41.126 (+1.441)
K-2 500 m	Martyna Klatt; Anna Puławska; Poland	1:37.273	Paulina Paszek; Pauline Jagsch; Germany	1:37.939 (+0.666)	Blanka Kiss; Anna Lucz; Hungary	1:38.123 (+0.850)
K-4 500 m	Sára Fojt; Noémi Pupp; Sára Fojt; Laura Ujfalvi; Emese Kőhalmi; Hungary	1:35.277	Sara Ouzande; Lucía Val; Estefanía Fernández; Bárbara Pardo; Spain	1:35.737 (+0.460)	Paulina Paszek; Katharina Diederichs; Pauline Jagsch; Hannah Spielhagen; Germany	1:36.164 (+0.887)

=== Mixed ===
Event	Gold		Silver		Bronze	
C-4 500 m +	Spain; Angels Moreno; María Corbera; Adrián Sieiro; Daniel Grijalba	1:36.255	Hungary; Réka Opavszky; Kristóf Kollár; István Juhász; Zsófia Csorba	1:36.868	Moldova; Serghei Tarnovschi; Maria Olărașu; Daniela Cociu; Oleg Tarnovschi	1:38.999

== Paracanoe ==
=== Medal table ===
* Host nation (Czech Republic)

Rank	Nation	Gold	Silver	Bronze	Total
1	Great Britain	4	4	1	9
2	Germany	1	0	1	2
2	Ukraine	1	0	1	2
4	Georgia	1	0	0	1
4	Portugal	1	0	0	1
6	Italy	0	2	0	2
7	France	0	1	1	2
8	Hungary	0	1	0	1
9	Spain	0	0	4	4
Totals (9 entries)		8	8	8	24

=== Medal events ===
Non-Paralympic classes

Event	Gold		Silver		Bronze	
Men's KL1	Péter Pál Kiss; Hungary	44.306	Rémy Boullé; France	48.966	Róbert Suba; Hungary	50.233
Men's KL2	David Phillipson; Great Britain	41.516	Christian Volpi; Italy	42.339	Mykola Syniuk; Ukraine	43.454
Men's KL3	Serhii Yemelianov; Georgia	39.965	Jonathan Young; Spain	41.022	Juan Valle; Spain	41.249
Men's VL1	Moritz Berthold; Germany	1:07.792	Alessio Bedin; Italy	1:10.199	Taylor Gough; Great Britain	1:11.016
Men's VL2	Norberto Mourão; Portugal	54.235	Edward Clifton; Great Britain	55.062	Higinio Rivero; Spain	55.202
Men's VL3	Vladyslav Yepifanov; Ukraine	46.783	Stuart Wood; Great Britain	48.696	Adrian Mosquera; Spain	49.793
Women's KL1	Maryna Mazhula; Ukraine	54.802	Not awarded			
Women's KL2	Charlotte Henshaw; Great Britain	48.218	Katalin Varga; Hungary	52.025	Anja Adler; Germany	52.568
Women's KL3	Laura Sugar; Great Britain	46.014	Nélia Barbosa; France	47.761	María Jiménez; Spain	47.788
Women's VL1	Chinette Karina Lauridsen; Germany	1:09.343	Viktoryia Pistis Shablova; Italy	1:13.413	Lillemor Köper; Germany	1:25.768
Women's VL2	Veronica Biglia; Italy	1:06.730	Ines Felipe; Spain	1:07.524	Edina Müller; Germany	1:08.837
Women's VL3	Hope Gordon; Great Britain	54.221	Charlotte Henshaw; Great Britain	55.491	Eléa Charvet; France	57.692
