= Csorba =

Csorba is a surname. Notable people with the surname include:

- Szabolcs Csorba (born 1991), Hungarian football player
- Zsófia Csorba (born 2003), Hungarian canoeist
