= 2026 ICF Canoe Sprint World Championships – Women's C-4 500 metres =

Women's C-4 500 metres at the 2026 ICF Canoe Sprint World Championships
- Venue: Lake Malta
- Location: Poznań, Poland
- Dates: 30 August
- Competitors: 24 from 6 nations
- Winning time: 1:45.68

Medalists
gold medal	Jiang Xina; Teng Anshuo; Sun Mengya; Ma Yanan	China
silver medal	Bianka Nagy; Réka Opavszky; Zsófia Csorba	Hungary
bronze medal	Zoe Wojtyk; Élizabeth Desrosiers-McArthur; Sloan MacKenzie; Katie Vincent	Canada

The women's C-4 500 metres competition at the 2026 ICF Canoe Sprint World Championships in Poznań, Poland took place 30 August 2026.

== Records ==
The world best time in the C-4 500 metres for women at the beginning of the competition was as follows:

Women's C-4 500 metres
World Best	1:44.65	China (CHN)	Szeged (Hungary)

== Schedule ==
The schedule is as follows:

Date	Time	
Sunday 30 August 2026	11:08	Final

== Results ==
Competitors raced for positions 1 to 6, with medals going to the top three.

=== Final ===
The Final was held on the afternoon of 29 August.

Rank	Lane	Name(s)	Nation	Time	Behind	Notes
1st place, gold medalist(s)	4	Jiang Xina; Teng Anshuo; Sun Mengya; Ma Yanan	China	1:45.68		
2nd place, silver medalist(s)	5	Ágnes Kiss; Bianka Nagy; Réka Opavszky; Zsófia Csorba	Hungary	1:46.61	+0.93	
3rd place, bronze medalist(s)	6	Zoe Wojtyk; Élizabeth Desrosiers-McArthur; Sloan MacKenzie; Katie Vincent	Canada	1:48.17	+2.49	
4	7	Katsiaryna Semiantsova; Inna Nedelkina; Yeva Danilchuk; Maryia Papichych	Neutral Athletes B	1:50.78	+5.10	
5	2	Amelia Marcinkowska; Amelia Sołtyńska; Kaja Lach; Maja Ruzanowska	Poland	1:52.27	+6.59	
6	3	Antía Jácome; Claudia Couto; Elena Gómez-Millán; Ana Cantero	Spain	1:58.47	+12.79	
