= 2022 ICF Canoe Sprint World Championships – Women's C-4 500 metres =

Women's C-4 500 metres at the 2022 ICF Canoe Sprint World Championships
- Venue: Lake Banook
- Location: Dartmouth, Canada
- Dates: 7 August
- Competitors: 28 from 7 nations
- Winning time: 1:56.14

Medalists
gold medal	Sophia Jensen; Sloan Mackenzie; Katie Vincent; Julia Osende	Canada
silver medal	Sylwia Szczerbińska; Aleksandra Jacewicz; Katarzyna Szperkiewicz; Julia Walczak	Poland
bronze medal	Giada Bragato; Virág Balla; Kincső Takács; Bianka Nagy	Hungary

The women's C-4 500 metres competition at the 2022 ICF Canoe Sprint World Championships in Dartmouth took place on Lake Banook.

== Schedule ==
The schedule is as follows:

Date	Time	Round
Sunday 7 August 2022	13:40	Final

== Results ==
With fewer than ten boats entered, this event was held as a direct final.

Rank	Canoeist	Country	Time
1st place, gold medalist(s)	Sophia Jensen; Sloan Mackenzie; Katie Vincent; Julia Osende	Canada	1:56.14
2nd place, silver medalist(s)	Sylwia Szczerbińska; Aleksandra Jacewicz; Katarzyna Szperkiewicz; Julia Walczak	Poland	1:56.31
3rd place, bronze medalist(s)	Giada Bragato; Virág Balla; Kincső Takács; Bianka Nagy	Hungary	1:57.39
4	Nicol Guzmán; Lucero Mendoza; Stephanie Guzmán; Beatriz Briones	Mexico	2:09.14
5	Emma Albrecht; Audrey Harper; Ten Kusaka; Azusa Murphy	United States	2:11.08
	María Moreno; María Prats; Aida Bauza; Begona Lazkano	Spain	DNS
	Anastasiya Horlova; Liudmyla Luzan; Liudmyla Kuklinovska; Anastasiia Chetverikova	Ukraine	DNS
