= 2023 ICF Canoe Sprint World Championships – Mixed C-2 500 metres =

Mixed C-2 500 metres at the 2023 ICF Canoe Sprint World Championships
- Venue: Sportpark Duisburg
- Location: Duisburg, Germany
- Dates: 24–27 August
- Competitors: 28 from 14 nations
- Winning time: 1:45.771

Medalists
gold medal	Connor Fitzpatrick; Katie Vincent	Canada
silver medal	Wiktor Głazunow; Sylwia Szczerbińska	Poland
bronze medal	Olympia Della Giustina; Daniele Santini	Italy

The mixed C-2 500 metres competition at the 2023 ICF Canoe Sprint World Championships in Duisburg took place in Sportpark Duisburg.

== Schedule ==
The schedule is as follows:

Date	Time	Round
Thursday 24 August 2023	12:20	Heats
Saturday 26 August 2023	17:00	Semifinals
Sunday 27 August 2023	12:29	Final A

== Results ==
=== Heats ===
The fastest three boats in each heat advanced directly to the final. The next four fastest boats in each heat, plus the fastest remaining boat advanced to the semifinal.

==== Heat 1 ====
Rank	Canoeist	Country	Time	Notes
1	Connor Fitzpatrick; Katie Vincent	Canada	1:45.799	QF
2	Wiktor Głazunow; Sylwia Szczerbińska	Poland	1:45.999	QF
3	Adel Mojallali; Hiva Afzali	Iran	1:47.986	QF
4	Taras Kuzyk; Yuliana Putnina	Ukraine	1:48.553	QS
5	Karen Roco; Michael Martínez	Chile	1:52.809	QS
6	Tania Virijac; Oleksandr Komiahin	Romania	1:53.605	QS
7	Sandra Royo; Daniel Grijalba	Spain	1:54.076	QS

==== Heat 2 ====
Rank	Canoeist	Country	Time	Notes
1	Yu Yuebin; Wan Yin	China	1:46.509	QF
2	Olympia Della Giustina; Daniele Santini	Italy	1:47.064	QF
3	Sebastian Brendel; Sophie Koch	Germany	1:47.448	QF
4	Alejandro Rodríguez; Manuela Gómez	Colombia	1:48.746	QS
5	Kincső Takács; Jonatán Hajdu	Hungary	1:48.879	QS
6	Nicol Guzmán; Gustavo Eslava	Mexico	1:54.914	QS
7	Anggie Avegno; Cristian Sola	Ecuador	2:00.467	QS

=== Semifinal ===
The fastest three boats advanced to the final.

Rank	Canoeist	Country	Time	Notes
1	Kincső Takács; Jonatán Hajdu	Hungary	1:47.642	QF
2	Taras Kuzyk; Yuliana Putnina	Ukraine	1:48.747	QF
3	Alejandro Rodríguez; Manuela Gómez	Colombia	1:48.758	QF
4	Sandra Royo; Daniel Grijalba	Spain	1:51.570	
5	Karen Roco; Michael Martínez	Chile	1:53.331	
6	Tania Virijac; Oleksandr Komiahin	Romania	1:53.473	
7	Anggie Avegno; Cristian Sola	Ecuador	1:55.258	
8	Nicol Guzmán; Gustavo Eslava	Mexico	2:03.100	

=== Final ===
Competitors raced for positions 1 to 9, with medals going to the top three.

Rank	Canoeist	Country	Time
1st place, gold medalist(s)	Connor Fitzpatrick; Katie Vincent	Canada	1:45.771
2nd place, silver medalist(s)	Wiktor Głazunow; Sylwia Szczerbińska	Poland	1:46.219
3rd place, bronze medalist(s)	Olympia Della Giustina; Daniele Santini	Italy	1:47.663
4	Kincső Takács; Jonatán Hajdu	Hungary	1:47.829
5	Sebastian Brendel; Sophie Koch	Germany	1:48.014
6	Taras Kuzyk; Yuliana Putnina	Ukraine	1:49.731
7	Alejandro Rodríguez; Manuela Gómez	Colombia	1:50.026
8	Adel Mojallali; Hiva Afzali	Iran	1:50.231
9	Yu Yuebin; Wan Yin	China	1:58.075
