= 2026 Asian Canoe Sprint Championships =

Canoeing competition in Tokyo, Japan

- Host city: Hefei, China
- Dates: 24–26 April 2026
- Main venue: Anhui Water Sports Center

The 2026 Asian Canoe Sprint Championships were the 21st Asian Canoe Sprint Championships and took place from 24 to 26 April 2026 in Zipeng Mountain, Hefei, China.

== Medal summary ==
=== Men ===
Event	Gold	Silver	Bronze
C-1 200 m	Artur Guliev; Uzbekistan	Yu Chenwei; China	Viktor Stepanov; Kazakhstan
C-1 500 m	Ji Bowen; China	Lai Kuan-chieh; Chinese Taipei	Mirjalol Kamilov; Uzbekistan
C-1 1000 m	Wu Shengyue; China	Mirjalol Kamilov; Uzbekistan	Lai Kuan-chieh; Chinese Taipei
C-1 5000 m	Zhu Jiadong; China	Diyorbek Mamatkulov; Uzbekistan	Phạm Hồng Quân; Vietnam
C-2 500 m	China; Xu Jian; Ji Bowen	Uzbekistan; Artur Guliev; Vladlen Denisov	Kazakhstan; Sergey Yemelyanov; Alisher Khayotov
C-2 1000 m	China; Ma Junhang; Zhong Xiubiao	Uzbekistan; Kamronbek Akhtamov; Nurislom Tukhtasin Ugli	Kazakhstan; Vladislav Rudenko; Timofey Yemelyanov
K-1 200 m	Liang Fengwei; China	Erlan Sultangaziev; Kyrgyzstan	Huỳnh Cao Minh; Vietnam
K-1 500 m	Li Chenhao; China	Bekarys Ramatulla; Kazakhstan	Taishi Tanada; Japan
K-1 1000 m	Shakhriyor Makhkamov; Uzbekistan	Yang Zhouyuxuan; China	Mizuki Aoki; Japan
K-1 5000 m	Oleksandr Zarubin; Uzbekistan	Kirill Tubayev; Kazakhstan	Zhang Xikang; China
K-2 500 m	China; Li Chenhao; Wang Jinwei	South Korea; Cho Gwang-hee; Kim Hyo-bin	Kazakhstan; Bekarys Ramatulla; Dmitriy Kholmogorov
K-4 500 m	China; Liang Fengwei; Ding Shengkai; Chen Weiyang; Wang Jinwei	South Korea; Cho Gwang-hee; Kim Hyo-bin; Jang Sang-won; Choi Min-kyu	Japan; Masaya Tanaka; Akihiro Inoue; Ryuji Matsushiro; Yuito Sakai

=== Women ===
Event	Gold	Silver	Bronze
C-1 200 m	Lin Wenjun; China	Shokhsanam Sherzodova; Uzbekistan	Herlin Aprilin Lali; Indonesia
C-1 500 m	Sun Mengya; China	Nguyễn Hồng Thái; Vietnam	Mariya Brovkova; Kazakhstan
C-1 5000 m	Nguyễn Hồng Thái; Vietnam	Li Shuqi; China	Mariya Brovkova; Kazakhstan
C-2 200 m	China; Shuai Changwen; Lin Wenjun	Uzbekistan; Shokhsanam Sherzodova; Nilufar Zokirova	Indonesia; Herlin Aprilin Lali; Sella Monim
C-2 500 m	China; Sun Mengya; Ma Yanan	Uzbekistan; Shokhsanam Sherzodova; Nilufar Zokirova	Vietnam; Nguyễn Thị Hương; Diệp Thị Hương
C-2 1000 m	China; Teng Anshuo; Jiang Xina	Vietnam; Nguyễn Thị Hương; Diệp Thị Hương	Uzbekistan; Khonzoda Erkinova; Muattarkhon Kodirjonova
K-1 200 m	Olga Shmelyova; Kazakhstan	Arina Tanatmisheva; Uzbekistan	Stephenie Chen; Singapore
K-1 500 m	Wang Nan; China	Ekaterina Shubina; Uzbekistan	Stella Sukhanova; Kazakhstan
K-1 1000 m	Stella Sukhanova; Kazakhstan	Qu Ningning; China	Milana Dušev-Janić; Uzbekistan
K-1 5000 m	Hu Huizhen; China	Stella Sukhanova; Kazakhstan	Maya Hosomi; Japan
K-2 500 m	China; Zhang Luxi; Yang Mengyuan	Kazakhstan; Olga Shmelyova; Tatyana Tokarnitskaya	Uzbekistan; Ekaterina Shubina; Arina Tanatmisheva
K-4 500 m	China; Yu Shimeng; Yin Mengdie; Wang Nan; Shen Siyu	Uzbekistan; Milana Dušev-Janić; Darya Mishina; Ekaterina Shubina; Arina Tanatmisheva	Kazakhstan; Evelina Kostenko; Olga Shmelyova; Tatyana Tokarnitskaya; Stella Sukhanova

=== Mixed ===
Event	Gold	Silver	Bronze
C-2 500 m	China; Wu Shengyue; Yang Li	Uzbekistan; Vladlen Denisov; Nilufar Zokirova	Kazakhstan; Sergey Yemelyanov; Rufina Iskakova
K-2 500 m	China; Han Donghuan; Zhang Wen	Kazakhstan; Olga Shmelyova; Artyom Terechshenko	Uzbekistan; Shakhrizoda Mavlonova; Ozod Amriddinov

== Medal table ==
Rank	Nation	Gold	Silver	Bronze	Total
1	China	20	4	1	25
2	Uzbekistan	3	11	5	19
3	Kazakhstan	2	5	9	16
4	Vietnam	1	2	3	6
5	South Korea	0	2	0	2
6	Chinese Taipei	0	1	1	2
7	Kyrgyzstan	0	1	0	1
8	Japan	0	0	4	4
9	Indonesia	0	0	2	2
10	Singapore	0	0	1	1
Totals (10 entries)		26	26	26	78
