= Canoeing at the 2023 Pan American Games – Women's C-2 500 metres =

Women's C-2 500 metres at the 2023 Pan American Games
- Venue: Laguna Grande
- Dates: November 4
- Competitors: 14 from 7 nations
- Winning time: 1:54.26

Medalists
Gold medal	Sloan MacKenzie; Katie Vincent	Canada
Silver medal	María Mailliard; Paula Gómez	Chile
Bronze medal	Madison Velásquez; Manuela Gómez	Colombia

The women's C-5 500 metres competition of the canoeing events at the 2023 Pan American Games was held on November 4 at the Laguna Grande in San Pedro de la Paz, Chile.

== Schedule ==
Date	Time	Round
November 4, 2023	10:00	Final

== Results ==
The results were as follows:

Rank	Name	Nation	Time
1st place, gold medalist(s)	Sloan MacKenzie; Katie Vincent	Canada	1:54.26
2nd place, silver medalist(s)	María Mailliard; Paula Gómez	Chile	1:54.43
3rd place, bronze medalist(s)	Madison Velásquez; Manuela Gómez	Colombia	1:59.10
4	Azusa Murphy; Andreea Ghizila	United States	2:02.60
5	Yarisleidis Cirilo; Yisnoly López	Cuba	2:03.58
6	Neida Angulo; Anggie Avegno	Ecuador	2:04.00
7	Tais Trimarchi; Martina Vela	Argentina	2:17.72
