= Àngels Moreno =

Spanish canoeist (born 2004)

Personal information
- Full name: Maria dels Àngels Moreno Bennàssar
- Born: 13 March 2004 (age 22)

Sport
- Country: Spain
- Sport: Canoe sprint
- Events: C–2 200 m, C–2 500 m
Medal record
Women's canoe sprint
Representing Spain
World Championships
Bronze medal – third place	2025 Milan	C-2 500 m
European Championships
Gold medal – first place	2025 Racice	C-2 200 m
Gold medal – first place	2025 Racice	C-2 500 m
Gold medal – first place	2025 Racice	C-4 Mix 500 m
Silver medal – second place	2026 Montemor-o-Velho	C-2 200 m
Bronze medal – third place	2026 Montemor-o-Velho	C-2 500 m

Maria dels Àngels Moreno Bennàssar (Note: In this Spanish name, the first or paternal surname is Moreno and the second or maternal family name is Bennàssar.) (born 13 March 2004) is a Spanish sprint canoeist.

== Career ==
In June 2025, Moreno competed at the 2025 Canoe Sprint European Championships and won gold medals in the C-2 200 metres, C-2 500 metres and mixed C-4 500 metres. Her three gold medals were the most by a Spanish canoeist at a single European Championships in history. In August 2025, she competed at the 2025 ICF Canoe Sprint World Championships and won a bronze medal in the C-2 500 metres, along with Viktoriia Yarchevska, with a time of 1:54.84.
