= Jiang Xina =

Chinese canoeist (born 2005)

Personal information
- Born: 22 March 2005 (age 21)

Sport
- Country: China
- Sport: Canoe sprint
- Event: C–1 500, C–2 1000, C–4 500 m
Medal record
Women's canoe sprint
Representing China
World Championships
Gold medal – first place	2026 Poznań	C-4 500 m
Bronze medal – third place	2024 Samarkand	C-1 1000 m
Bronze medal – third place	2025 Milan	C-4 500 m
Asian Championships
Gold medal – first place	2025 Nanchang	C-2 1000 m
Gold medal – first place	2026 Hefei	C-2 1000 m

Jiang Xina (Chinese: 蒋希娜; born 22 March 2005) is a Chinese sprint canoeist.

== Career ==
In August 2025, Jiang competed at the 2025 ICF Canoe Sprint World Championships and won a bronze medal in the C-4 500 metres, with a time of 1:47.50.

In April 2026, she competed at the 2026 Asian Canoe Sprint Championships and won a gold medal in the C-2 1000 metres, along with Teng Anshuo. In August 2026, she competed at the 2026 ICF Canoe Sprint World Championships and won a gold medal in the C-4 500 metres with a time of 1:45.68. She also reached the finals of the C-1 500 metres, finishing in fourth place.
