= Viktoriia Yarchevska =

Spanish canoeist (born 2005)

Personal information
- Born: 29 April 2005 (age 21)

Sport
- Country: Spain
- Sport: Canoe sprint
- Events: C–2 200 m, C–2 500 m
Medal record
Women's canoe sprint
Representing Spain
World Championships
Bronze medal – third place	2024 Samarkand	C-4 Mix 500 m
Bronze medal – third place	2025 Milan	C-2 500 m
European Championships
Gold medal – first place	2025 Racice	C-2 200 m
Gold medal – first place	2025 Racice	C-2 500 m
Gold medal – first place	2026 Montemor-o-Velho	C-4 Mix 500 m
Silver medal – second place	2026 Montemor-o-Velho	C-2 200 m
Bronze medal – third place	2025 Racice	C-1 200 m
Bronze medal – third place	2026 Montemor-o-Velho	C-2 500 m

Viktoriia Yarchevska (born 29 April 2005) is a Spanish sprint canoeist.

== Career ==
In August 2024, Yarchevska made her World Championships debut at the 2024 ICF Canoe Sprint World Championships and won a bronze medal in the mixed C-4 500 metres. In June 2025, she competed at the 2025 Canoe Sprint European Championships and won gold medals in the C-2 200 metres and C-2 500 metres, and a bronze medal in the C-1 200 metres event. In August 2025, she competed at the 2025 ICF Canoe Sprint World Championships and won a bronze medal in the C-2 500 metres, along with Àngels Moreno, with a time of 1:54.84.
