= 2022 ICF Canoe Sprint World Championships – Mixed C-2 500 metres =

Mixed C-2 500 metres at the 2022 ICF Canoe Sprint World Championships
- Venue: Lake Banook
- Location: Dartmouth, Canada
- Dates: 7 August
- Competitors: 16 from 8 nations
- Winning time: 1:56.87

Medalists
gold medal	Connor Fitzpatrick; Katie Vincent	Canada
silver medal	Sebastian Brendel; Sophie Koch	Germany
bronze medal	Aleksander Kitewski; Sylwia Szczerbińska	Poland

The mixed C-2 500 metres competition at the 2022 ICF Canoe Sprint World Championships in Dartmouth took place on Lake Banook.

== Schedule ==
The schedule is as follows:

Date	Time	Round
Sunday 7 August 2022	13:11	Final

== Results ==
=== Final ===
With fewer than ten boats entered, this event was held as a direct final.

Rank	Canoeist	Country	Time
1st place, gold medalist(s)	Connor Fitzpatrick; Katie Vincent	Canada	1:56.87
2nd place, silver medalist(s)	Sebastian Brendel; Sophie Koch	Germany	1:58.84
3rd place, bronze medalist(s)	Aleksander Kitewski; Sylwia Szczerbińska	Poland	1:59.17
4	Tania Virijac; Oleg Nuta	Romania	2:00.86
5	Liudmyla Luzan; Pavlo Altukhov	Ukraine	2:01.79
6	Laura Gönczöl; Dániel Fejes	Hungary	2:02.17
7	Jonathan Grady; Andreea Ghizila	United States	2:03.99
8	Michael Moses; Foloki Goodness	Nigeria	2:27.17
	Alejandro Rodríguez; Manuela Gómez	Colombia	DNS
