= 2026 ICF Canoe Sprint World Championships – Women's C-1 500 metres =

Women's C-1 500 metres at the 2026 ICF Canoe Sprint World Championships
- Venue: Lake Malta
- Location: Poznań, Poland
- Dates: 26–29 August
- Competitors: 28 from 28 nations
- Winning time: 2:00.78

Medalists
gold medal	Sophia Jensen	Canada
silver medal	Ágnes Kiss	Hungary
bronze medal	Alena Nazdrova	Individual Neutral Athletes

The women's C-1 500 metres competition at the 2026 ICF Canoe Sprint World Championships in Poznań, Poland took place between 26 and 29 August 2026.

== Records ==
The world best time in the C-1 500 metres for women at the beginning of the competition was as follows:

Women's C-1 500 metres
World Best	1:59.00	Sun Mengya (CHN)	Szeged (Hungary)

== Schedule ==
The schedule is as follows:

Date	Time	Round
Wednesday 26 August 2026	14:00	Heats
Friday 28 August 2026	09:45	Semifinals
Saturday 29 August 2026	14:20	Final B
Saturday 29 August 2026	15:04	Final A

== Results ==
=== Heats ===
Four heats were held on afternoon of 26 August 2026.

Qualification rule : First six in each heat (SF) plus three next fastest (qBT) qualify for semi-finals; remainder are eliminated.

Heat 1

Rank	Lane	Name(s)	Nation	Time	Behind	Notes
1	4	Jiang Xina	China	2:18.44		SF
2	3	Chloé Nicot	France	2:23.08	+4.64	SF
3	6	Hedi Kliemke	Germany	2:31.18	+12.74	SF
4	5	Dorota Borowska	Poland	2:34.31	+15.87	SF
5	7	Hermínia Teixeira	São Tomé and Príncipe	2:35.70	+17.26	SF
6	8	Damia Humaira Binte Ridwan	Singapore	2:40.86	+22.42	SF
7	2	Cai Shu-han	Chinese Taipei	2:53.84	+35.40	qBT

Heat 2

Rank	Lane	Name(s)	Nation	Time	Behind	Notes
1	5	Sophia Jensen	Canada	2:18.33		SF
2	7	Alena Nazdrova	Neutral Athletes B	2:21.70	+3.37	SF
3	6	Valeriia Tereta	Ukraine	2:22.04	+3.71	SF
4	4	Denisa Řáhová	Czech Republic	2:29.49	+11.16	SF
5	3	Emma Albrecht	United States	2:30.62	+12.29	SF
6	9	Johana Ariana Padilla Rivera	Peru	3:03.16	+44.83	SF
	2	Chanez Slimane	Algeria	DSQ		

Heat 3

Rank	Lane	Name(s)	Nation	Time	Behind	Notes
1	5	Olympia Della Giustina	Italy	2:21.29		SF
2	4	Daniela Cociu	Moldova	2:23.82	+2.53	SF
3	6	Mariya Brovkova	Kazakhstan	2:24.76	+3.47	SF
4	3	Tetiana Smylovenko	Azerbaijan	2:29.67	+8.38	SF
5	2	Combe Seck	Senegal	2:50.33	+29.04	SF
6	7	Tamara Pavić	Bosnia and Herzegovina	2:53.40	+32.11	SF
7	8	Ayomide Bello	Nigeria	2:54.23	+32.94	qBT

Heat 4

Rank	Lane	Name(s)	Nation	Time	Behind	Notes
1	5	Ágnes Kiss	Hungary	2:20.17		SF
2	6	Vanesa Tot	Croatia	2:22.80	+2.63	SF
3	8	Radostina Angelova	Bulgaria	2:23.37	+3.20	SF
4	4	Bethany Gill	Great Britain	2:24.11	+3.94	SF
5	3	Claudia Couto	Spain	2:33.48	+13.31	SF
6	7	Madison Velásquez	Colombia	2:42.39	+22.22	SF
7	2	Gana Ahmed Abdelaziz Morsy	Egypt	2:48.42	+28.25	qBT

=== Semi finals ===
Three semi finals were held on morning of 28 August 2026.

Qualification rule : First three in each heat to A final (FA) next three in each heat to B final (FB); remainder are eliminated. (1-3 -> FA; 4-6 -> FB; 7... -> el.)

Semi final 1

Rank	Lane	Name(s)	Nation	Time	Behind	Notes
1	4	Alena Nazdrova	Neutral Athletes B	2:17.49		FA
2	5	Jiang Xina	China	2:19.29	+1.80	FA
3	6	Daniela Cociu	Moldova	2:20.79	+3.30	FA
4	7	Bethany Gill	Great Britain	2:23.65	+6.16	FB
5	3	Radostina Angelova	Bulgaria	2:34.05	+16.56	FB
6	8	Hermínia Teixeira	São Tomé and Príncipe	2:35.34	+17.85	FB
7	9	Gana Ahmed Abdelaziz Morsy	Egypt	2:43.33	+25.84	
8	2	Combe Seck	Senegal	2:44.46	+26.97	
9	1	Johana Ariana Padilla Rivera	Peru	2:44.80	+27.31	

Semi final 2

Rank	Lane	Name(s)	Nation	Time	Behind	Notes
1	5	Sophia Jensen	Canada	2:16.63		FA
2	3	Mariya Brovkova	Kazakhstan	2:19.31	+2.68	FA
3	6	Hedi Kliemke	Germany	2:19.79	+3.16	FA
4	7	Tetiana Smylovenko	Azerbaijan	2:23.37	+6.74	FB
5	2	Dorota Borowska	Poland	2:26.01	+9.38	FB
6	9	Madison Velásquez	Colombia	2:26.90	+10.27	FB
7	4	Vanesa Tot	Croatia	2:27.16	+10.53	
8	8	Emma Albrecht	United States	2:29.53	+12.90	
9	1	Cai Shu-han	Chinese Taipei	2:45.54	+28.91	

Semi final 3

Rank	Lane	Name(s)	Nation	Time	Behind	Notes
1	5	Ágnes Kiss	Hungary	2:19.57		FA
2	4	Olympia Della Giustina	Italy	2:19.94	+0.37	FA
3	7	Denisa Řáhová	Czech Republic	2:19.94	+0.37	FA
4	3	Valeriia Tereta	Ukraine	2:20.84	+1.27	FB
5	6	Chloé Nicot	France	2:24.16	+4.59	FB
6	2	Claudia Couto	Spain	2:26.07	+6.50	FB
7	1	Damia Humaira Binte Ridwan	Singapore	2:42.77	+23.20	
8	9	Ayomide Bello	Nigeria	2:45.79	+26.22	
9	8	Tamara Pavić	Bosnia and Herzegovina	2:58.12	+38.55	

=== Finals ===
The A and B finals were held on the afternoon of 29 August.

B Final

Rank	Lane	Name(s)	Nation	Time	Behind	Notes
1	6	Valeriia Tereta	Ukraine	2:08.91		
2	5	Tetiana Smylovenko	Azerbaijan	2:10.09	+1.18	
3	3	Chloé Nicot	France	2:10.21	+1.30	
4	1	Claudia Couto	Spain	2:11.73	+2.82	
5	7	Dorota Borowska	Poland	2:13.17	+4.26	
6	4	Bethany Gill	Great Britain	2:13.37	+4.46	
7	2	Madison Velásquez	Colombia	2:15.53	+6.62	
8	8	Radostina Angelova	Bulgaria	2:24.67	+15.76	
9	9	Hermínia Teixeira	São Tomé and Príncipe	2:27.39	+18.48	

A final

Rank	Lane	Name(s)	Nation	Time	Behind	Notes
1st place, gold medalist(s)	5	Sophia Jensen	Canada	2:00.78		
2nd place, silver medalist(s)	4	Ágnes Kiss	Hungary	2:02.80	+2.02	
3rd place, bronze medalist(s)	6	Alena Nazdrova	Neutral Athletes B	2:04.80	+4.02	
4	2	Jiang Xina	China	2:06.23	+5.45	
5	3	Mariya Brovkova	Kazakhstan	2:06.33	+5.55	
6	1	Denisa Řáhová	Czech Republic	2:06.83	+6.05	
7	7	Olympia Della Giustina	Italy	2:07.16	+6.38	
8	8	Hedi Kliemke	Germany	2:10.84	2:10.84	
9	9	Daniela Cociu	Moldova	2:10.98	+10.20	
