= Réka Opavszky =

Hungarian canoeist

Personal information
- Nationality: Hungarian
- Born: 23 August 2003 (age 23)

Sport
- Country: Hungary
- Sport: Canoe sprint
Medal record
World Championships
Gold medal – first place	2025 Milan	C-4 500 m
Silver medal – second place	2021 Copenhagen	C-4 500 m
Silver medal – second place	2026 Poznań	C-4 500 m
European Championships
Silver medal – second place	2025 Racice	C-1 500 m
Silver medal – second place	2025 Racice	C-4 Mix 500 m
Bronze medal – third place	2026 Montemor-o-Velho	C-4 Mix 500 m

Réka Opavszky (born 23 August 2003) is a Hungarian sprint canoeist.

She competed at the 2021 ICF Canoe Sprint World Championships, winning a silver medal in the C-4 500 m distance.
