= 2025 ICF Canoe Sprint World Championships – Women's C-1 5000 metres =

Women's C-1 5000 metres at the 2025 ICF Canoe Sprint World Championships
- Venue: Idroscalo Regatta Course
- Location: Milan, Italy
- Dates: 24 August
- Competitors: 19 from 18 nations
- Winning time: 26:19.99

Medalists
gold medal	Volha Klimava	Individual Neutral Athletes
silver medal	Katie Vincent	Canada
bronze medal	Zsófia Csorba	Hungary

The women's C-1 5000 metres competition at the 2025 ICF Canoe Sprint World Championships in Milan took place at Idroscalo Regatta Course.

== Schedule ==
The schedule is as follows:

Date	Time	Round
Sunday 24 August 2025	14:04	Final

== Results ==
As a long-distance event, it was held as a direct final.

Rank	Canoeist	Country	Time	Notes
1st place, gold medalist(s)	Volha Klimava	Individual Neutral Athletes	26:19.99	
2nd place, silver medalist(s)	Katie Vincent	Canada	26:34.92	
3rd place, bronze medalist(s)	Zsófia Csorba	Hungary	26:48.01	
4	María Mailliard	Chile	27:16.37	
5	Valeriia Tereta	Ukraine	27:49.89	
6	Audrey Harper	United States	27:55.73	
7	Daniela Cociu	Moldova	27:57.79	
8	Shokhsanam Sherzodova	Uzbekistan	28:26.34	
9	Martina Malíková	Czech Republic	28:29.61	
10	Ana Cantero	Spain	29:03.31	
11	Maike Jakob	Germany	29:14.01	
12	Aleksandra Vlasova	Individual Neutral Athletes	29:40.31	
13	Teruko Kiriake	Japan	29:48.05	
14	Yurely Marín	Colombia	29:57.75	
15	Sella Monim	Indonesia	30:32.49	
16	Lee Ye-lin	South Korea	31:23.51	
	Bethany Gill	Great Britain	DNF	
	Lealyn Baligasa	Philippines	DNS	
	Tamara Pavic	Bosnia and Herzegovina	DNS	
