= Zsófia Csorba =

Hungarian canoeist (born 2003)

Personal information
- Full name: Zsófia Katalin Csorba
- Born: 5 February 2003 (age 23)

Sport
- Country: Hungary
- Sport: Canoe sprint Canoe marathon
- Events: C-4 500 m, C-1 5000 m
Medal record
Representing Hungary
Women's canoe sprint
World Championships
Gold medal – first place	2025 Milan	C-4 500 m
Silver medal – second place	2026 Poznań	C-1 5000 m
Silver medal – second place	2026 Poznań	C-4 500 m
Bronze medal – third place	2025 Milan	C-1 5000 m
European Championships
Gold medal – first place	2025 Račice	C-1 5000 m
Gold medal – first place	2026 Montemor-o-Velho	C-1 5000 m
Silver medal – second place	2025 Račice	C-4 Mix 500 m
Bronze medal – third place	2026 Montemor-o-Velho	C-4 Mix 500 m
Women's canoe marathon
World Championships
Gold medal – first place	2025 Győr	C-1 short race

Zsófia Katalin Csorba (born 5 February 2003) is a Hungarian sprint canoeist.

== Career ==
In June 2025, Csorba competed at the 2025 Canoe Sprint European Championships and won a gold medal in the C–1 5000 metres, with a time of 26:55.664. and a silver medal in the mixed C-4 500 metres. In August 2025, she competed at the 2025 ICF Canoe Sprint World Championships and won a gold medal in the C-4 500 metres, with a time of 1:46.43. She also won a bronze medal in the C-1 5000 metres with a time of 26:48.01. The next month she competed at the 2025 ICF Canoe Marathon World Championships and won a gold medal in the C-1 short race with a time of 18:25.50.
