= Katie Vincent =

Canadian canoeist (born 1996)

- Vincent in 2026

Personal information
- Full name: Katharine Leslie Vincent
- Born: March 12, 1996 (age 30) Mississauga, Ontario, Canada
- Height: 1.75 m (5 ft 9 in)
- Weight: 63 kg (139 lb)

Sport
- Country: Canada
- Sport: Canoe sprint
- Club: Mississauga Canoe Club
- Partner: Sloan MacKenzie (C-2)
- Coached by: Kyle Jeffrey and Mark Granger
Medal record
Women's canoe sprint
Representing Canada
Olympic Games
Gold medal – first place	2024 Paris	C-1 200 m
Bronze medal – third place	2020 Tokyo	C-2 500 m
Bronze medal – third place	2024 Paris	C-2 500 m
World Championships
Gold medal – first place	2017 Racice	C-2 500 m
Gold medal – first place	2018 Montemor-o-Velho	C-2 500 m
Gold medal – first place	2021 Copenhagen	C-1 200 m
Gold medal – first place	2022 Dartmouth	C-1 5000 m
Gold medal – first place	2022 Dartmouth	C-4 500 m
Gold medal – first place	2022 Dartmouth	C-2 Mix 500 m
Gold medal – first place	2023 Duisburg	C-1 500 m
Gold medal – first place	2023 Duisburg	C-1 5000 m
Gold medal – first place	2023 Duisburg	C-2 Mix 500 m
Silver medal – second place	2025 Milan	C-1 500 m
Silver medal – second place	2025 Milan	C-2 500 m
Silver medal – second place	2025 Milan	C-1 5000 m
Bronze medal – third place	2018 Montemor-o-Velho	C-1 500 m
Bronze medal – third place	2023 Duisburg	C-2 500 m
Bronze medal – third place	2023 Duisburg	C-4 500 m
Bronze medal – third place	2026 Poznań	C-4 500 m
Pan American Games
Gold medal – first place	2023 Santiago	C-2 500 m

Katharine Leslie "Katie" Vincent (born March 12, 1996) is a Canadian sprint canoeist. She won a gold medal in the women's C-1 200 metres event at the 2024 Paris Olympics, as well as two bronze medals in the women's C-2 500 metres event, at the 2020 Tokyo Olympics and the 2024 Paris Olympics.

== Career ==
She participated at the 2017 Racice, 2018 ICF Canoe Sprint World Championships, 2019 Szeged.

She represented Canada at the 2020 Summer Olympics in the debut women's canoe events Women's C-1 200 metres. Vincent would later win bronze in the women's C-2 500 metres with partner Laurence Vincent Lapointe. In June 2024, Vincent was named to her second Olympic team. At the Paris Olympics, Vincent won bronze in the C-2 500 event and gold in the C-1 200 event with a World's Best time of 44.12. Vincent became the first women to win a gold medal for Canada in the sport of canoeing.

On June 29, 2025 Vincent set a world record of 2:00.61 in the women's C-1 500-metre event at the Canadian national trials in Montreal, breaking the previous mark of 2:00.73 set by Alena Nazdrova of Belarus at the 2019 world championships.
