= Kaveri Dimar =

Indian canoeist

Medal record

Women's sprint canoe

Representing India

Asian Championships
Bronze medal – third place	2022 Rayong	C-4 200 m

Kaveri Dimar (also spelled Kaveri Dhimar) is an Indian canoeist, who won a bronze medal at the 2022 Asian Canoe Sprint Championships.

== Early life ==
Dimar was born in a fisherman's family in Mandi village, Sehore, Madhya Pradesh, the fifth of nine siblings. As she grew up, she would accompany her father and elder sisters when they went fishing. The Khandwa district Sports Officer, Joseph Baxla, spotted her talent as a promising swimmer in 2016, and she was admitted to the Madhya Pradesh Water Sports Academy in 2017. She later turned to canoeing as a sport. She studies at the Lovely Professional University.

== Career ==
Dimar has won 15 gold, two silver and a bronze across various solo and team events in India's National Canoe Championships over the period 2020–2022. She teamed up with Namita Chandel, Anjali Bashishth and Shivani Verma to win the bronze medal in the C-4 200m event at the 2022 Asian Canoe Sprint Championships in Rayong.

== Achievements ==
- 3 x gold medals, C-4 (1000m, 200m) and C-2 (500m) events, National Canoe Sprint Championship, Bhopal, 2020
- 7 x gold medals, C-4 (200m), C-2 (1000m, 500m, 200m) and C-1 (5000m, 1000m, 500m), National Canoe Sprint Championship, Bilaspur, 2021
- 5 x gold medals, C-4 (500m), C-2 (1000m), C-1 (5000m, 1000m, 500m); 2 x Silver medals - C-2 (200m, 200m Mixed); Bronze medal – C-4 (200m), National Canoe Sprint Championship, Bhopal, 2022
- Bronze medal, C-4 (200m), Asian Canoe Sprint Championships, Rayong, 2022.
