= Sára Fojt =

Hungarian canoeist (born 2003)

Personal information
- Nationality: Hungarian
- Born: 3 December 2003 (age 22)

Sport
- Sport: Sprint kayak
- Club: Katalin Kovács National Kayak-Canoe Academy
- Coached by: Andrea Gintl
Medal record
Women's canoe sprint
Representing Hungary
Olympic Games
Bronze medal – third place	2024 Paris	K-4 500 m
Bronze medal – third place	2024 Paris	K-2 500 m
European Championships
Gold medal – first place	2024 Szeged	K-2 1000 m
Gold medal – first place	2024 Szeged	K-4 500 m
Gold medal – first place	2025 Racice	K-4 500 m

Sára Fojt (born 3 December 2003) is a Hungarian sprint canoeist.

== Career ==
At the 2024 Summer Olympics, she competed in the women's K-4 500 metres, where she won a bronze medal with the Hungarian team, and in the women's K-2 500 metres, where she won bronze with Noémi Pupp.
