= Ma Yanan =

Chinese canoeist (born 1999)

Personal information
- Born: 15 January 1999 (age 27)

Sport
- Country: China
- Sport: Canoe sprint
- Event: C–1 500, C–2 500, C–4 500 m
Medal record
Women's canoe sprint
Representing China
World Championships
Gold medal – first place	2026 Poznań	C-4 500 m
Bronze medal – third place	2025 Milan	C-4 500 m
Asian Championships
Gold medal – first place	2017 Shanghai	C-1 500 m
Gold medal – first place	2025 Nanchang	C-2 500 m
Gold medal – first place	2026 Hefei	C-2 500 m
Asian Games
Gold medal – first place	2018 Jakarta-Palembang	C-2 500 m
Gold medal – first place	2026 Aichi–Nagoya	C-2 500 m
Gold medal – first place	2026 Aichi–Nagoya	Mixed C-2 500 m

Ma Yanan (Chinese: 马亚男; born 15 January 1999) is a Chinese sprint canoeist.

== Career ==
Ma represented China at the 2018 Asian Games and won a gold medal in the C-2 500 metres, along with Sun Mengya.

In August 2025, she competed at the 2025 ICF Canoe Sprint World Championships and won a bronze medal in the C-4 500 metres, with a time of 1:47.50.

In April 2026, she competed at the 2026 Asian Canoe Sprint Championships and won a gold medal in the C-2 500 metres, along with Sun Mengya. In August 2026, she competed at the 2026 ICF Canoe Sprint World Championships and won a gold medal in the C-4 500 metres with a time of 1:45.68.
