= Sloan MacKenzie =

Canadian canoeist (born 2002)

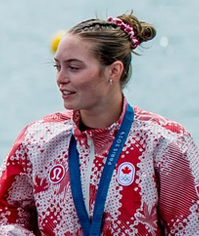

Personal information
- Born: May 16, 2002 (age 24) Halifax, Nova Scotia, Canada

Sport
- Country: Canada
- Sport: Canoe sprint
Medal record
Women's canoe sprint
Representing Canada
Olympic Games
Bronze medal – third place	2024 Paris	C-2 500 m
World Championships
Gold medal – first place	2022 Dartmouth	C-4 500 m
Bronze medal – third place	2023 Duisburg	C-2 500 m
Bronze medal – third place	2023 Duisburg	C-4 500 m
Bronze medal – third place	2026 Poznań	C-4 500 m
Pan American Games
Gold medal – first place	2023 Santiago	C-2 500 m

Sloan MacKenzie (born May 16, 2002) is a Canadian sprint canoeist. MacKenzie is a bronze Olympic medalist in women's C-2 500 metres event and also multiple time World Championships medallist.

== Career ==
At the 2022 Canada Summer Games in the Niagara Region, MacKenzie won four gold medals competing for Nova Scotia. MacKenzie made her senior team debut in 2022, and went onto win the gold medal in the C-4 500 m at the 2022 ICF Canoe Sprint World Championships. This followed by two bronze medals at the 2023 ICF Canoe Sprint World Championships.

In September 2023, MacKenzie was named to Canada's 2023 Pan American Games team. MacKenzie would go onto win the gold medal with partner Katie Vincent in the C-2 500 m event.

In June 2024, MacKenzie was named to Canada's 2024 Summer Olympics team.
