= Iryna Fedoriv =

Ukrainian canoeist (born 2005)

Personal information
- Native name: Ірина Федорів
- Born: 1 May 2005 (age 21)

Sport
- Country: Ukraine
- Sport: Canoe sprint
- Events: C–2 200 m, C–2 500 m
Medal record
Women's canoe sprint
Representing Ukraine
World Championships
Gold medal – first place	2025 Milan	C-2 200 m
Gold medal – first place	2025 Milan	C-2 500 m
European Championships
Silver medal – second place	2025 Racice	C-2 200 m
Silver medal – second place	2025 Racice	C-2 500 m

Iryna Oleksandrivna Fedoriv (Ukrainian: Ірина Олександрівна Федорів, born 1 May 2005) is a Ukrainian sprint canoeist.

== Career ==
In June 2025, Csikós competed at the 2025 Canoe Sprint European Championships and won silver medals in the C–2 200 metres and C–2 500 metres, along with Liudmyla Luzan. In August 2025, she competed at the 2025 ICF Canoe Sprint World Championships and won gold medals in the C-2 200 metres, with a world record time of 41.87, and the C-2 500 metres, with a time of 1:53.30.
