= Noémi Pupp =

Hungarian canoeist (born 1998)

Personal information
- Nationality: Hungarian
- Born: 28 July 1998 (age 27)

Sport
- Sport: Sprint kayak
- Club: Atomerőmű SE
- Coached by: Ferenc Csipes
Medal record
Women's canoe sprint
Representing Hungary
Olympic Games
Bronze medal – third place	2024 Paris	K-4 500 m
Bronze medal – third place	2024 Paris	K-2 500 m
European Championships
Gold medal – first place	2024 Szeged	K-2 1000 m
Gold medal – first place	2024 Szeged	K-4 500 m
Gold medal – first place	2025 Racice	K-4 500 m

Noémi Pupp (born 28 July 1998) is a Hungarian sprint canoeist. At the 2024 Summer Olympics, she competed in the women's K-4 500 metres, where she won a bronze medal with the Hungarian team, and in the women's K-2 500 metres, where she won bronze with Sára Fojt.

Pupp's sister, Réka, is a judoka who also competed in Paris, finishing 5th in her event.
