= Taylor Gough =

English sportsperson (born 2000)

Taylor Gough (born 12 February 2000) is an English para-canoeist and former professional rugby union player.

Gough was originally a footballer, playing for the Derby County academy.

Gough played for Leicester Tigers, making one senior appearance, but was paralysed in a car crash in June 2020.

After a long rehabilitation process, including the renovation of his house to accommodate his wheelchair, he later became a para-canoeist.
