= Ágnes Kiss =

Hungarian canoeist (born 2005)

Personal information
- Full name: Ágnes Anna Kiss
- Born: 22 May 2005 (age 21) Szeged, Hungary

Sport
- Country: Hungary
- Sport: Canoe sprint
- Events: C-1 500 m, C-2 500 m, C-4 500 m
Medal record
Women's canoe sprint
Representing Hungary
World Championships
Gold medal – first place	2025 Milan	C-4 500 m
Silver medal – second place	2026 Poznań	C-1 500 m
Silver medal – second place	2026 Poznań	C-4 500 m
European Championships
Gold medal – first place	2024 Szeged	C-2 500 m
Silver medal – second place	2026 Montemor-o-Velho	C-2 500 m
Bronze medal – third place	2024 Szeged	C-2 200 m
Bronze medal – third place	2025 Racice	C-2 200 m
Bronze medal – third place	2025 Racice	C-2 500 m
European Games
Bronze medal – third place	2023 Kraków-Małopolska	C-1 500 m

Ágnes Anna Kiss (born 22 May 2005) is a Hungarian sprint canoeist. She represented Hungary at the 2024 Summer Olympics.

== Career ==
In June 2024, Kiss competed at the 2024 Canoe Sprint European Championships and won a gold medal in the C-2 500 metres and a bronze medal in the C-2 200 metres, along with Bianka Nagy. In August 2024, she represented Hungary at the 2024 Summer Olympics and finished in fourth place in the C-2 500 metres.

In June 2025, she competed at the 2025 Canoe Sprint European Championships and won bronze medals in the C–2 200 metres and C–2 500 metres, along with Nagy. In August 2025, she competed at the 2025 ICF Canoe Sprint World Championships and won a gold medal in the C-4 500 metres, with a time of 1:46.43.
