= Sylwia Szczerbińska =

Polish canoeist (born 1997)

Personal information
- Nationality: Polish
- Born: 11 October 1997 (age 28)

Sport
- Country: Poland
- Sport: Canoe sprint
- Event: Canoeing
Medal record
World Championships
Silver medal – second place	2018 Montemor-o-Velho	C-2 200 m
Silver medal – second place	2022 Dartmouth	C-4 500 m
Silver medal – second place	2023 Duisburg	C-2 Mix 500 m
Bronze medal – third place	2022 Dartmouth	C-2 Mix 500 m
European Games
Silver medal – second place	2023 Kraków–Małopolska	C-2 Mix 200 m
European Championships
Silver medal – second place	2024 Szeged	C-2 200 m
Silver medal – second place	2024 Szeged	C-2 500 m
Bronze medal – third place	2022 Munich	C-2 500 m

Sylwia Szczerbińska (born 11 October 1997) is a Polish sprint canoeist.

She participated at the 2018 ICF Canoe Sprint World Championships.
