= Canada at the 2020 Summer Olympics =

- Flag of Canada
- IOC code: CAN
- NOC: Canadian Olympic Committee
- Website: www.olympic.ca

in Tokyo, Japan July 23, 2021 – August 8, 2021
- Competitors: 381 (148 men and 233 women) in 30 sports
- Flag bearers (opening): Miranda Ayim; Nathan Hirayama
- Flag bearer (closing): Damian Warner
- Coaches: 131
- Medals Ranked 11th: Gold 7 Silver 7 Bronze 10 Total 24

Summer Olympics appearances (overview)
- ~~1900~~; 1904; 1908; 1912; 1920; 1924; 1928; 1932; 1936; 1948; 1952; 1956; 1960; 1964; 1968; 1972; 1976; 1980; 1984; 1988; 1992; 1996; 2000; 2004; 2008; 2012; 2016; 2020; 2024; 2028

Other related appearances
- 1906 Intercalated Games

Canada competed at the 2020 Summer Olympics in Tokyo. Originally scheduled to take place from 24 July to 9 August 2020, the Games were postponed to 23 July to 8 August 2021, because of the COVID-19 pandemic. Since the nation's debut in 1900, Canadian athletes have appeared in every edition of the Summer Olympic Games, with the exception of the 1980 Summer Olympics in Moscow because of the country's support for United States-led boycott.

Before the official postponement, the Canadian Olympic Committee and Canadian Paralympic Committee initially announced their intention not to send teams to both the Olympics and Paralympics. Following the announcement on the postponement, the COC and CPC issued a statement that says, in part, that Team Canada "will rise to the challenge to showcase our very best on the international stage," without explicitly saying that Canadian athletes will take part in the games.

As part of the Canada Day celebrations held on Parliament Hill, Ottawa in 2019, former three time Olympic gold medalist in rowing, Marnie McBean was named as the Chef De Mission for the team.

On July 13, 2021, the Canadian Olympic Committee officially announced the full team of 370 athletes (145 men and 225 women) competing in 30 sports, the largest team the country has sent to the games since Los Angeles 1984 and an increase of 56 from Rio 2016. 131 coaches will also accompany the team. A total of eight squads qualified in team sports, tied for the most ever with Montreal 1976. A total of 227 athletes competed at their first Olympics, and 134 of them returned from Rio 2016. On July 15, 2021, Vasek Pospisil withdrew from the tennis competitions, which reduced the team size to 370. On July 24, Annie Guglia received a reallocated spot in the women's street skateboarding event after an injury to a competitor from South Africa. This increased the team back to 371 athletes (145 men and 226 women).

Due to the effects of the COVID-19 pandemic, the International Olympic Committee announced in July 2021, that travelling alternates would be allowed to compete in the following team sports: field hockey, football (soccer), handball, rugby sevens and water polo. The alternates for these team sports are listed below and consisted of a further nine athletes (two in field hockey, four in soccer, one per rugby sevens and water polo teams). However, these nine do not officially count towards the team size. Canada's Olympic team contested all sports on the Olympic program except handball, modern pentathlon and surfing. Alternates in soccer, rugby sevens and water polo competed, and are reflected in the table below. This increased the team size to 378. Two athletes in fencing and one in triathlon was added during the competition due to injury replacements. This meant the final team size was 381 athletes (148 men and 233 women).

On July 19, 2021, basketball player Miranda Ayim and rugby sevens athlete Nathan Hirayama were named as co-flagbearers for the Parade of Nations during the opening ceremony. On August 8, 2021, gold medalist and Olympic record holder in the decathlon, Damian Warner was named as the flagbearer during the closing ceremony.

The 24 medals won at the 2020 Summer Olympics mark the country's best-ever total medals result after the 1984 Games, surpassing the 22 medals won in 1996 and 2016, while also equalling the most number of gold medals won in 1992. At the 1984 Summer Olympics, which were boycotted by the Soviet Bloc, Canada won 44 medals.

== Medallists ==
Medal	Name(s)	Sport	Event	Date
Gold	Maggie Mac Neil	Swimming	Women's 100 m butterfly	July 26
Gold	Maude Charron	Weightlifting	Women's 64 kg	July 27
Gold	Susanne Grainger; Kasia Gruchalla-Wesierski; Madison Mailey; Sydney Payne; Andrea Proske; Lisa Roman; Christine Roper; Avalon Wasteneys; Kristen Kit	Rowing	Women's eight	July 30
Gold	Andre De Grasse	Athletics	Men's 200 m	August 4
Gold	Damian Warner	Athletics	Men's decathlon	August 5
Gold	Canada women's national soccer team Janine Beckie, Kadeisha Buchanan, Gabrielle Carle, Allysha Chapman, Jessie Fleming, Vanessa Gilles, Julia Grosso, Jordyn Huitema, Stephanie Labbé, Ashley Lawrence, Adriana Leon, Erin McLeod, Nichelle Prince, Quinn, Jayde Riviere, Deanne Rose, Sophie Schmidt, Desiree Scott, Kailen Sheridan, Christine Sinclair, Évelyne Viens, Shelina Zadorsky	Football	Women's tournament	August 6
Gold	Kelsey Mitchell	Cycling	Women's sprint	August 8
Silver	Kayla Sanchez; Maggie Mac Neil; Taylor Ruck; Rebecca Smith; Penny Oleksiak	Swimming	Women's 4 × 100 m freestyle relay	July 25
Silver	Jennifer Abel; Melissa Citrini-Beaulieu	Diving	Women's synchronized 3 metre springboard	July 25
Silver	Kylie Masse	Swimming	Women's 100 m backstroke	July 27
Silver	Kylie Masse	Swimming	Women's 200 m backstroke	July 31
Silver	Laurence Vincent Lapointe	Canoeing	Women's C-1 200 metres	August 4
Silver	Mohammed Ahmed	Athletics	Men's 5,000 m	August 6
Silver^{[a]}	Jerome Blake; Aaron Brown; Andre De Grasse; Brendon Rodney	Athletics	Men's 4 × 100 m relay	August 6
Bronze	Jessica Klimkait	Judo	Women's 57 kg	July 26
Bronze	Canada women's national softball team Jenna Caira, Emma Entzminger, Larissa Franklin, Jennifer Gilbert, Sara Groenewegen, Kelsey Harshman, Victoria Hayward, Danielle Lawrie, Janet Leung, Joey Lye, Erika Polidori, Kaleigh Rafter, Lauren Regula, Jennifer Salling, Natalie Wideman	Softball	Women's tournament	July 27
Bronze	Catherine Beauchemin-Pinard	Judo	Women's 63 kg	July 27
Bronze	Penny Oleksiak	Swimming	Women's 200 m freestyle	July 28
Bronze	Caileigh Filmer; Hillary Janssens	Rowing	Women's coxless pair	July 29
Bronze	Kayla Sanchez; Maggie Mac Neil; Kylie Masse; Sydney Pickrem; Taylor Ruck; Penny Oleksiak	Swimming	Women's 4 × 100 m medley relay	August 1
Bronze	Andre De Grasse	Athletics	Men's 100 m	August 1
Bronze	Lauriane Genest	Cycling	Women's keirin	August 5
Bronze	Evan Dunfee	Athletics	Men's 50 kilometres walk	August 6
Bronze	Katie Vincent; Laurence Vincent Lapointe	Canoeing	Women's C-2 500 metres	August 7

^{a} Canada finished third in the Men's 4 x 100 metres relay. On 18 February 2022 team of Great Britain was disqualified from the Athletics Men's 4 × 100 metres relay due to a doping violation and officially stripped of the silver medal. Canada was elevated to the silver medal, while China received bronze. The team received its medals on July 29, 2023.

Medals by discipline/sport
Sport	1st place, gold medalist(s)	2nd place, silver medalist(s)	3rd place, bronze medalist(s)	Total
Athletics	2	2	2	6
Swimming	1	3	2	6
Cycling	1	0	1	2
Rowing	1	0	1	2
Football	1	0	0	1
Weightlifting	1	0	0	1
Canoeing	0	1	1	2
Diving	0	1	0	1
Judo	0	0	2	2
Softball	0	0	1	1
Total	7	7	10	24

Medals by date
Date	1st place, gold medalist(s)	2nd place, silver medalist(s)	3rd place, bronze medalist(s)	Total
July 24	0	0	0	0
July 25	0	2	0	2
July 26	1	0	1	2
July 27	1	1	2	4
July 28	0	0	1	1
July 29	0	0	1	1
July 30	1	0	0	1
July 31	0	1	0	1
August 1	0	0	2	2
August 2	0	0	0	0
August 3	0	0	0	0
August 4	1	1	0	2
August 5	1	0	1	2
August 6	1	2	1	4
August 7	0	0	1	1
August 8	1	0	0	1
Total	7	7	10	24

== Competitors ==
The following is the list of athletes per sport/discipline.

Sport	Men	Women	Total
Archery	1	1	2
Artistic swimming	—N/a	8	8
Athletics (track and field)	24	33	57
Badminton	4	4	8
Basketball	0	12	12
Boxing	1	4	5
Canoeing	10	8	18
Cycling	11	13	24
Diving	4	6	10
Equestrian	2	4	6
Fencing	6	5	11
Field hockey	16	0	16
Football (soccer)	0	22	22
Golf	2	2	4
Gymnastics	1	6	7
Judo	3	3	6
Karate	1	0	1
Rowing	9	20	29
Rugby sevens	13	13	26
Sailing	5	4	9
Shooting	0	1	1
Skateboarding	3	1	4
Softball	—N/a	15	15
Sport climbing	1	1	2
Swimming	10	16	26
Table tennis	2	1	3
Taekwondo	0	2	2
Tennis	1	3	4
Triathlon	3	2	5
Volleyball	12	4	16
Water polo	0	13	13
Weightlifting	1	4	5
Wrestling	2	2	4
Total	148	233	381

== Archery ==
Canada qualified one archer for the men's individual recurve, after Crispin Duenas won the individual gold medal at the 2019 Pan American Games in Lima, Peru. In March 2021, Stephanie Barrett claimed one of three available quota places in the women's individual recurve, at the 2021 Pan American Qualification Tournament in Monterrey, Mexico. Barrett was officially nominated to the team on May 12, 2021. The team was officially named on June 28, 2021.

Athlete	Event	Ranking round		Round of 64	Round of 32	Round of 16	Quarterfinals	Semifinals	Final / BM	
Athlete	Event	Score	Seed	Opposition Score	Opposition Score	Opposition Score	Opposition Score	Opposition Score	Opposition Score	Rank
Crispin Duenas	Men's individual	665	16	Olaru (MDA); W 6–0	Shana (BAN); W 6–4	Unruh (GER); L 2–6	Did not advance			9
Stephanie Barrett	Women's individual	630	46	Anagöz (TUR); L 2–6	Did not advance					33
Crispin Duenas; Stephanie Barrett	Mixed team	1295	17	—N/a		Did not advance				17

== Artistic swimming ==
Canada is scheduled to enter a team of eight artistic swimmers to compete in the women's duet and team event. The team qualified by winning the gold medal in the team event at the 2019 Pan American Games in Lima, Peru. The team was officially named on June 2, 2021.

Athlete	Event	Technical routine		Free routine (preliminary)			Free routine (final)		
Athlete	Event	Points	Rank	Points	Total (technical + free)	Rank	Points	Total (technical + free)	Rank
Claudia Holzner; Jacqueline Simoneau	Duet	91.4798	5	91.2333	182.7131	5 Q	93.0000	184.4798	5
Emily Armstrong; Rosalie Boissonneault; Andrée-Anne Côté; Camille Fiola-Dion; Claudia Holzner; Audrey Joly; Halle Pratt; Jacqueline Simoneau	Team	91.4992	5	—N/a			92.5333	184.0325	6

== Athletics (track and field) ==
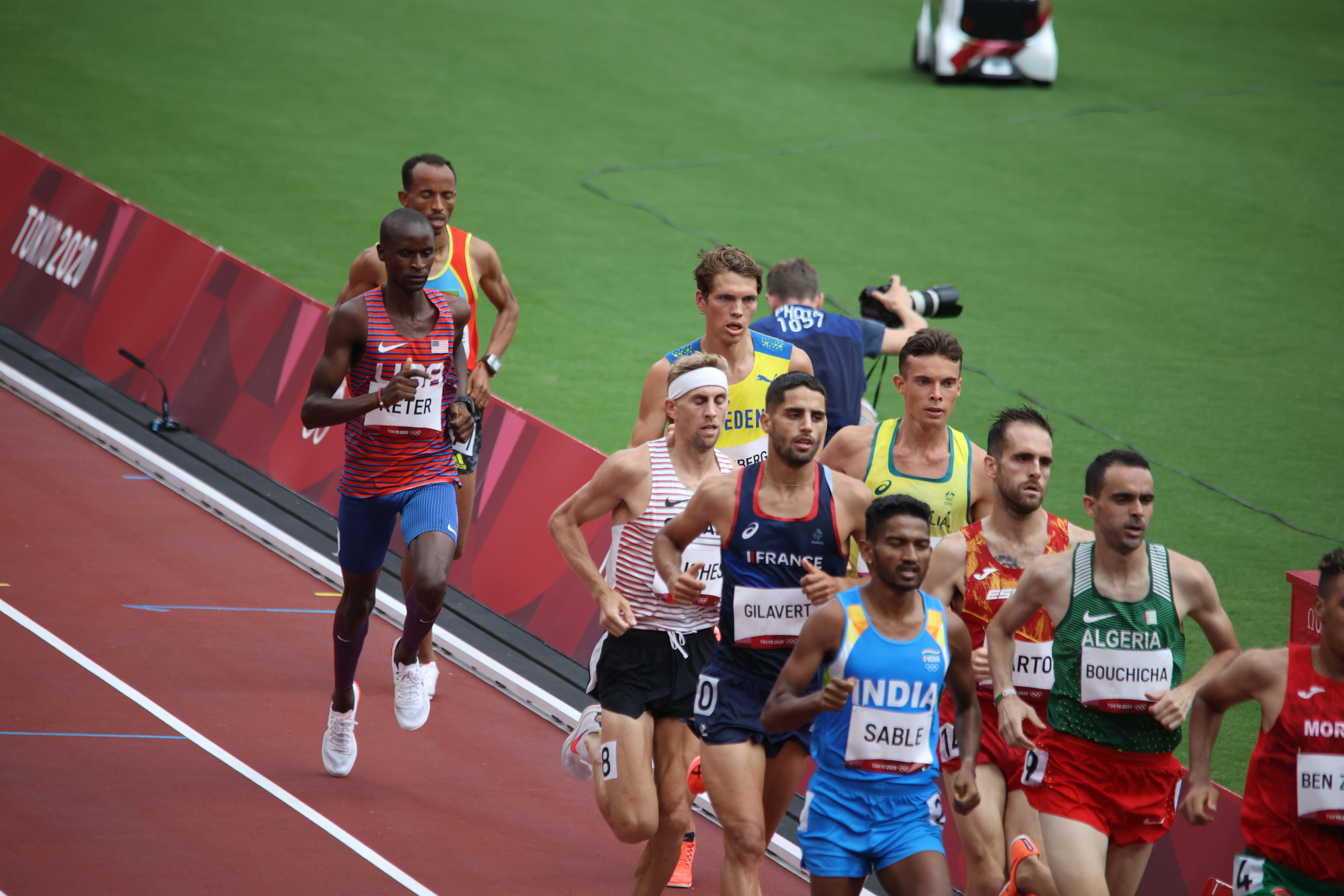
Matthew Hughes during the heats of the men's 3,000m steeplechase event.

Canadian athletes achieved the entry standards, either by qualifying time or by world ranking, in the following track and field events (up to a maximum of 3 athletes in each event): The team will be selected based on the results of the 2020 Canadian Olympic Track & Field Trials.

On May 5, 2020, 2019 world bronze medalist Evan Dunfee, along with marathoners Trevor Hofbauer and Dayna Pidhoresky, became the first Canadian track and field athletes to be selected to the Tokyo 2020 team. On June 4, 2021, Athletics Canada named the 10,000 metres, 50 km race walk and the rest of the marathon team. The final team of 57 athletes (24 men and 33 women) was named on July 3, 2021. Bolade Ajomale and Lauren Gale named to the men's 4x100 relay and women's 4x400 relay teams respectively, did not compete in the heats or the final.

Key

- Note–Ranks given for track events are within the athlete's heat only
- Q =Qualified for the next round
- q =Qualified for the next round as a fastest loser or, in field events, by position without achieving the qualifying target
- NR =National record
- PB =Personal best
- SB =Seasonal best
- N/A =Round not applicable for the event
- Bye =Athlete not required to compete in round

Track & road events
Men

Athlete	Event	Heat		Quarterfinal		Semifinal		Final	
Athlete	Event	Result	Rank	Result	Rank	Result	Rank	Result	Rank
Bismark Boateng	100 m	Bye		10.47	8	Did not advance			
Andre De Grasse	100 m	Bye		9.91	1 Q	9.98	2 Q	9.89 PB	3rd place, bronze medalist(s)
Gavin Smellie	100 m	Bye		10.44	8	Did not advance			
Aaron Brown	200 m	20.38	1 Q	—N/a		19.99	1 Q	20.20	6
Andre De Grasse	200 m	20.56	3 Q	—N/a		19.73	1 Q	19.62 NR	1st place, gold medalist(s)
Brendon Rodney	200 m	20.60	6	—N/a		Did not advance			
Marco Arop	800 m	1:45.26	1 Q	—N/a		1:44.90	7	Did not advance	
Brandon McBride	800 m	1:46.32	6	—N/a		Did not advance			
Mohammed Ahmed	5,000 m	13:38.96	2 Q	—N/a				12:58.61	2nd place, silver medalist(s)
Lucas Bruchet	5,000 m	13:44.08	13	—N/a				Did not advance	
Justyn Knight	5,000 m	13:30.22	3 Q	—N/a				13:04.38	7
Mohammed Ahmed	10,000 m	—N/a						27:47.76 SB	6
John Gay	3000 m steeplechase	8:16.99	6 q	—N/a				8:35.41	15
Matthew Hughes	3000 m steeplechase	8:13.56	4 q	—N/a				8:16.03	6
Jerome Blake; Aaron Brown; Andre De Grasse; Brendon Rodney	4 × 100 m relay	37.92	2 Q	—N/a				37.70	2nd place, silver medalist(s)
Trevor Hofbauer	Marathon	—N/a						2:19:57 SB	48
Cameron Levins	Marathon	—N/a						2:28:43	72
Ben Preisner	Marathon	—N/a						2:19:27 SB	46
Mathieu Bilodeau	50 km walk	—N/a						4:20:36 SB	45
Evan Dunfee	50 km walk	—N/a						3:50:59 SB	3rd place, bronze medalist(s)

Women

Athlete	Event	Heat		Quarterfinal		Semifinal		Final	
Athlete	Event	Result	Rank	Result	Rank	Result	Rank	Result	Rank
Khamica Bingham	100 m	Bye		11.21	4 q	11.22	5	Did not advance	
Crystal Emmanuel	100 m	Bye		11.18	3 Q	11.21	6	Did not advance	
Crystal Emmanuel	200 m	22.74	1 Q	—N/a		23.05	6	Did not advance	
Kyra Constantine	400 m	51.69	5 q	—N/a		51.22	5	Did not advance	
Natassha McDonald	400 m	53.54	7	—N/a		Did not advance			
Melissa Bishop-Nriagu	800 m	2:02.11	4	—N/a		Did not advance			
Lindsey Butterworth	800 m	2:02.45	5	—N/a		Did not advance			
Madeleine Kelly	800 m	2:02.39	5	—N/a		Did not advance			
Gabriela DeBues-Stafford	1500 m	4:03.70	1 Q	—N/a		3:58.28	3 Q	3:58.93	5
Natalia Hawthorn	1500 m	4:08.04	10	—N/a		Did not advance			
Lucia Stafford	1500 m	4:03.52	7 q	—N/a		4:02.12	6	Did not advance	
Andrea Seccafien	5,000 m	14:59.55	10 q	—N/a				15:12.09	15
Julie-Anne Staehli	5,000 m	15:33.39	17	—N/a				Did not advance	
Kate Van Buskirk	5,000 m	15:14.96	14	—N/a				Did not advance	
Andrea Seccafien	10,000 m	—N/a						31:36.36	14
Noelle Montcalm	400 m hurdles	55.85	6	—N/a		Did not advance			
Sage Watson	400 m hurdles	55.54	4 Q	—N/a		55.51	5	Did not advance	
Alycia Butterworth	3000 m steeplechase	9:34.25	10	—N/a				Did not advance	
Geneviève Lalonde	3000 m steeplechase	9:22.64 NR	4 q	—N/a				9:22.40 NR	11
Regan Yee	3000 m steeplechase	9:41.14	8	—N/a				Did not advance	
Alicia Brown; Kyra Constantine; Madeline Price; Sage Watson	4 × 400 m relay	3:24.05 SB	5 q	—N/a				3:21.84 SB	4
Malindi Elmore	Marathon	—N/a						2:30:59 SB	9
Dayna Pidhoresky	Marathon	—N/a						3:03:10 SB	73
Natasha Wodak	Marathon	—N/a						2:31:41 SB	13

Field events
Men

Athlete	Event	Qualification		Final	
Athlete	Event	Result	Rank	Result	Rank
Django Lovett	High jump	2.28	1 Q	2.30	8
Michael Mason	High jump	2.25	14	Did not advance	
Tim Nedow	Shot put	19.42	16	Did not advance	

Women

Athlete	Event	Qualification		Final	
Athlete	Event	Result	Rank	Result	Rank
Christabel Nettey	Long jump	6.29	22	Did not advance	
Anicka Newell	Pole vault	4.55	=1 q	NM	—
Alysha Newman	Pole vault	NM	—	Did not advance	
Brittany Crew	Shot put	NM	—	Did not advance	
Sarah Mitton	Shot put	16.62	27	Did not advance	
Elizabeth Gleadle	Javelin throw	58.19	23	Did not advance	
Camryn Rogers	Hammer throw	73.97	2 Q	74.35	5
Jillian Weir	Hammer throw	68.68	11	Did not advance	

Combined events – Men's decathlon

Athlete	Event	100 m	LJ	SP	HJ	400 m	110H	DT	PV	JT	1500 m	Total	Rank
Pierce LePage	Result	10.43	7.65	15.31	1.99	46.92	14.39	47.14	5.00	57.24 SB	4:31.85 PB	8604 PB	5
Pierce LePage	Points	992	972	809	794	962	925	811	910	696	733	8604 PB	5
Damian Warner	Result	10.12 WDB	8.24 ODB	14.80	2.02	47.48	13.46 ODB	48.67	4.90 =PB	63.44 SB	4:31.08	9018 OR	1st place, gold medalist(s)
Damian Warner	Points	1066	1123	777	822	934	1045	843	880	790	738	9018 OR	1st place, gold medalist(s)

Combined events – Women's heptathlon

Athlete	Event	100H	HJ	SP	200 m	LJ	JT	800 m	Total	Rank
Georgia Ellenwood	Result	13.47	1.83	12.39	24.51	5.86	63.44 SB	2:19.21	6077	20
Georgia Ellenwood	Points	1055	1016	687	932	807	790	834	6077	20

== Badminton ==
Canada entered eight badminton players (four per gender) for the following events based on the BWF Race to Tokyo Rankings of 15 June 2021: one entry each in the men's and women's singles; and a pair each in the men's, women's, and mixed doubles. The eight qualified athletes represents the largest badminton team Canada has sent to the Olympics, and marks the first time since Sydney 2000 the country will compete in all five events. The team was officially named on June 16, 2021.

Athlete	Event	Group stage				Elimination	Quarterfinal	Semifinal	Final / BM	Rank
Athlete	Event	Opposition Score	Opposition Score	Opposition Score	Rank	Opposition Score	Opposition Score	Opposition Score	Opposition Score	Rank
Brian Yang	Men's singles	Burestedt (SWE); L 12–21, 17–21	Chou T-c (TPE); L 18–21, 21–16, 20–22	—N/a	3	Did not advance				15
Michelle Li	Women's singles	Sotomayor (GUA); W 21–8, 21–9	Repiská (SVK); W 21–18, 21–16	—N/a	1 Q	Okuhara (JPN); L 9–21, 7–21	Did not advance			9
Jason Ho-Shue; Nyl Yakura	Men's doubles	Ahsan / Setiawan (INA); L 12–21, 11–21	Choi S-g / Seo S-j (KOR); L 14–21, 8–21	Chia / Soh W Y (MAS); L 15–21, 13–21	4	—N/a	Did not advance			9
Rachel Honderich; Kristen Tsai	Women's doubles	Piek / Seinen (NED); L 21–16, 14–21, 15–21	Matsumoto / Nagahara (JPN); L 21–14, 19–21, 18–21	Hany / Hosny (EGY); W 21–5, 21–6	3	—N/a	Did not advance			9
Joshua Hurlburt-Yu; Josephine Wu	Mixed doubles	Puavaranukroh / Taerattanachai (THA); L 13–21, 6–21	Ellis / Smith (GBR); L 13–21, 19–21	Delrue / Gicquel (FRA); L 12–21, 13–21	4	—N/a	Did not advance			9

== Basketball ==
Summary

Team	Event	Group stage				Quarterfinal	Semifinal	Final / BM	
Team	Event	Opposition Score	Opposition Score	Opposition Score	Rank	Opposition Score	Opposition Score	Opposition Score	Rank
Canada women's	Women's tournament	Serbia; L 68–72	South Korea; W 74–53	Spain; L 66–76	3	Did not advance			9

=== Women's tournament ===
Canada women's basketball team qualified for the Olympics as one of two highest-ranked eligible teams at the Ostend event of the 2020 FIBA Women's Olympic Qualifying Tournament.

Team roster

Canada's women's basketball team of 12 athletes was announced on June 30, 2021.

Canada women's national basketball team – 2020 Summer Olympics roster
Players
Coaches

Pos.	No.	Name	Age – Date of birth	Height	Club	Ctr.
PG	1	Shaina Pellington	22 – 1 June 1999	1.70 m (5 ft 7 in)	Arizona Wildcats	(United States)
G	5	Kia Nurse	25 – 22 February 1996	1.82 m (6 ft 0 in)	Phoenix Mercury	(United States)
F	6	Bridget Carleton	24 – 22 May 1997	1.85 m (6 ft 1 in)	Minnesota Lynx	(United States)
F	7	Nayo Raincock-Ekunwe	29 – 29 August 1991	1.88 m (6 ft 2 in)	ASVEL Féminin	(France)
G	8	Kim Gaucher	37 – 7 May 1984	1.86 m (6 ft 1 in)	USO Mondeville	(France)
F	9	Miranda Ayim	33 – 6 May 1988	1.91 m (6 ft 3 in)	Basket Landes	(France)
C	11	Natalie Achonwa	28 – 22 November 1992	1.91 m (6 ft 3 in)	Minnesota Lynx	(United States)
G	13	Shay Colley	25 – 6 January 1996	1.76 m (5 ft 9 in)	Charnay Basket Bourgogne SUD	(France)
C	14	Kayla Alexander	30 – 5 January 1991	1.93 m (6 ft 4 in)	Dynamo Novosibirsk	(Russia)
F	15	Laeticia Amihere	20 – 10 July 2001	1.86 m (6 ft 1 in)	South Carolina Gamecocks	(United States)
G	21	Nirra Fields	27 – 3 December 1993	1.76 m (5 ft 9 in)	İzmit Belediyespor	(Turkey)
F	24	Aaliyah Edwards	19 – 9 July 2002	1.91 m (6 ft 3 in)	UConn Huskies	(United States)

Head coach

- (Canada) Lisa Thomaidis

Assistant coach(es)

- (Canada) Steve Baur
- (Canada) Carly Clarke

Legend

- Club – describes last
  club before the tournament
- Age – describes age
  on 26 July 2021

Group A

Pos	Team	Pld	W	L	PF	PA	PD	Pts	Qualification
1	Spain	3	3	0	234	205	+29	6	Quarterfinals
2	Serbia	3	2	1	207	214	−7	5	Quarterfinals
3	Canada	3	1	2	208	201	+7	4	
4	South Korea	3	0	3	183	212	−29	3	

Source: TOCOG and FIBA
Rules for classification: 1) classification points; 2) head-to-head results; 3) head-to-head game points difference; 4) head-to-head number of game points scored.

26 July 2021
17:20
v

Boxscore

Serbia	72–68	Canada
Scoring by quarter: 16–13, 20–15, 9–17, 27–23
Pts: Vasić 16; Rebs: Dabović 6 Asts: Crvendakić, Dabović 5		Pts: Fields 19; Rebs: Nurse 6 Asts: Achonwa 5

Saitama Super Arena, Saitama
Referees: Amy Bonner (USA), Leandro Lezcano (ARG), Maj Forsberg (DEN)

29 July 2021
10:00
v

Boxscore

Canada	74–53	South Korea
Scoring by quarter: 16–15, 17–13, 16–11, 25–14
Pts: Carleton 18; Rebs: Achonwa 10; Asts: Achonwa 5		Pts: Park Ji-s. 15; Rebs: Park Ji-s. 11; Asts: three players 3

Saitama Super Arena, Saitama
Referees: Amy Bonner (USA), James Boyer (AUS), Gizella Györgyi (NOR)

1 August 2021
10:00
v

Boxscore

Canada	66–76	Spain
Scoring by quarter: 13–23, 21–17, 13–20, 19–16
Pts: Nurse 14; Rebs: four players 6 Asts: Carleton 4		Pts: Ndour 20; Rebs: Ndour 11; Asts: Ouviña 7

Saitama Super Arena, Saitama
Referees: Yu Jung (TPE), Leandro Lezcano (ARG), Yevgeniy Mikheyev (KAZ)

== Boxing ==
Canada qualified five boxers, one man and four women. With the cancellation of the 2021 Pan American Qualification Tournament in Buenos Aires, Caroline Veyre (women's featherweight), Myriam Da Silva (women's welterweight), and Tammara Thibeault (women's middleweight) finished among the top three of their respective weight divisions in the IOC's Boxing Task Force Rankings for the Americas. On June 9, 2021, Wyatt Sanford earned a spot on the team, as the highest ranked boxer from the Americas not already qualified.

On June 30, 2021, Mandy Bujold won her appeal at the Court of Arbitration for Sport to compete at the Games. The court ruled that the qualification system must accommodate pregnant or postpartum women during the qualification period. The full team of five athletes was officially named to the team on July 7, 2021.

Athlete	Event	Round of 32	Round of 16	Quarterfinals	Semifinals	Final	Rank
Athlete	Event	Opposition Result	Opposition Result	Opposition Result	Opposition Result	Opposition Result	Rank
Wyatt Sanford	Men's 69 kg	Clair (MRI); L 0–5	Did not advance				17
Mandy Bujold	Women's 51 kg	Radovanović (SRB); L 0–5	Did not advance				17
Caroline Veyre	Women's 57 kg	Bye	Ćaćić (CRO); W 5–0	Testa (ITA); L 0–5	Did not advance		5
Myriam Da Silva	Women's 69 kg	Bye	Moronta (DOM); L 0–5	Did not advance			9
Tammara Thibeault	Women's 75 kg	—N/a	Ryabets (KAZ); W 4–1	Fontijn (NED); L 0–5	Did not advance		5

== Canoeing ==
Canada qualified a total of 20 canoeists. Four qualified in slalom (two per gender, the maximum team size). A further 16 qualified in sprint (eight men and eight women).

=== Slalom ===
Canadian canoeists qualified three boats through the 2019 ICF Canoe Slalom World Championships in La Seu d'Urgell, Spain. With the cancellation of the 2021 Pan American Championships, Canada accepted the invitation from the ICF to send a canoeist in the women's slalom C-1 to the Games, as the highest-ranked eligible nation from the Americas. The team was officially named on June 3, 2021. For the first time since Sydney 2000, Canada qualified entries all events.

Athlete	Event	Preliminary						Semifinal		Final	
Athlete	Event	Run 1	Rank	Run 2	Rank	Best	Rank	Time	Rank	Time	Rank
Cameron Smedley	Men's C-1	161.07	17	108.12	15	108.12	16	Did not advance			
Michael Tayler	Men's K-1	117.98	20	106.04	24	106.04	24	Did not advance			
Haley Daniels	Women's C-1	152.98	20	191.00	21	152.98	22	Did not advance			
Florence Maheu	Women's K-1	114.29	13	135.35	24	114.29	18 Q	152.37	23	Did not advance	

=== Sprint ===
Canada qualified three boats and nine athlete spots (four each in men's and women's kayak, and one in women's canoe) at the 2019 ICF Canoe Sprint World Championships in Szeged, Hungary. In March 2021, the Pan American sprint qualifier that was scheduled to be held in Curitiba, Brazil was cancelled due to concerns over the COVID-19 pandemic. Due to the cancellation, the International Canoe Federation announced that Canada had been allocated an additional two quotas in each of men's kayak and canoe, along with an additional quota in women's kayak. This meant the team stood at a total of six men's kayakers and two canoeists, along with five women's kayakers and one canoeist (for a total of 14 athletes).

In March 2021, Canoe Kayak Canada selected the C-1 and K-4 women's boats based on performances at the trials. In May 2021, Canoe Kayak Canada named the men's kayak and canoe teams. The final team of 16 athletes (eight per gender) was officially named on July 7, 2021. In the team announcement, a further kayak and canoe quotas was awarded to Canada in the women's events.

Key

- Note–Ranks given for sprint events are within the athlete's heat only
- Qualification Legend: FA =Qualify to final (medal); FB =Qualify to final B (non-medal); QF =Qualify to quarterfinal; SF =Qualify to semifinal

Men

Athlete	Event	Heats		Quarterfinals		Semifinals		Final	
Athlete	Event	Time	Rank	Time	Rank	Time	Rank	Time	Rank
Connor Fitzpatrick	C-1 1000 m	4:05.577	3 QF	4:09.622	2 SF	4:12.609	9 FB	4:06.043	14
Roland Varga	C-1 1000 m	4:49.250	5 QF	4:28.174	6	Did not advance			
Connor Fitzpatrick; Roland Varga	C-2 1000 m	3:49.263	5 QF	3:50.768	3 SF	3:27.145	3 FA	3:30.157	6
Mark de Jonge	K-1 200 m	36.110	4 QF	35.462	3	Did not advance			
Nicholas Matveev	K-1 200 m	36.190	4 QF	35.181	2 SF	36.584	7 FB	36.625	14
Simon McTavish	K-1 1000 m	3:43.512	5 QF	3:52.467	4	Did not advance			
Vincent Jourdenais; Brian Malfesi	K-2 1000 m	3:22.068	6 QF	3:15.736	4 FB	Bye		3:25.181	14
Mark de Jonge; Nicholas Matveev; Simon McTavish; Pierre-Luc Poulin	K-4 500 m	1:26.824	3 QF	1:24.979	5 SF	1:25.581	5	Did not advance	

Women

Athlete	Event	Heats		Quarterfinals		Semifinals		Final	
Athlete	Event	Time	Rank	Time	Rank	Time	Rank	Time	Rank
Laurence Vincent Lapointe	C-1 200 m	45.408	1 SF	Bye		47.294	3 FA	46.786	2nd place, silver medalist(s)
Katie Vincent	C-1 200 m	46.391	1 SF	Bye		47.604	3 FA	47.834	8
Laurence Vincent Lapointe; Katie Vincent	C-2 500 m	2:02.170	3 QF	2:02.259	1 SF	2:04.316	2 FA	1:59.041	3rd place, bronze medalist(s)
Andréanne Langlois	K-1 200 m	41.525	5 QF	41.728	1 SF	39.952	3 FA	40.473	9
Michelle Russell	K-1 200 m	42.236	5 QF	42.940	2 SF	40.224	7 FB	40.527	13
Michelle Russell	K-1 500 m	1:51.081	4 QF	1:51.375	3 SF	1:55.549	7	Did not advance	
Alanna Bray-Lougheed; Madeline Schmidt	K-2 500 m	1:49.776	5 QF	1:51.862	5	Did not advance			
Alanna Bray-Lougheed; Andréanne Langlois; Michelle Russell; Madeline Schmidt	K-4 500 m	1:38.971	4 QF	1:38.537	8 FB	—N/a		1:39.946	11

== Cycling ==
Canada qualified a total of 24 cyclists (11 men and 13 women), the largest cycling team the county has ever qualified for the games. This is broken down further into five in road, 13 in track, three in mountain biking and two in BMX racing.

=== Road ===
Canada entered a team of six road cyclists (three per gender). The men qualified three athletes by finishing 20th in the UCI Nation Ranking, while the women qualified two competitors, by finishing in eighth.

On July 29, 2020, cyclists Hugo Houle, Michael Woods, Karol-Ann Canuel, and Leah Kirchmann were officially named to the Canadian roster for their second consecutive Games. The final cyclist named to the team was Guillaume Boivin on July 6, 2021. On July 13, 2021, it was announced that a third women's quota was reallocated to Canada. This quota was given to Allison Jackson for the road race event.

Men

Athlete	Event	Time	Rank
Hugo Houle	Road race	6:25:16	85
Michael Woods	Road race	6:06:33	5
Guillaume Boivin	Road race	6:21:46	65
Hugo Houle	Time trial	57:56.46	13

Women

Athlete	Event	Time	Rank
Karol-Ann Canuel	Road race	3:55:05	16
Allison Jackson	Road race	3:59:47	32
Leah Kirchmann	Road race	3:59:47	36
Karol-Ann Canuel	Time trial	33:07.97	14
Leah Kirchmann	Time trial	33:01.64	12

=== Track ===
Following the completion of the 2020 UCI Track Cycling World Championships, Canadian riders accumulated spots for both men and women in the team pursuit and madison, as well as the women's omnium, based on their country's results in the final UCI Olympic rankings. Canada also entered cyclists to compete each in the men's and women's sprint, as well as the men's and women's keirin, based on the final individual UCI Olympic rankings. Cycling Canada later decided to not enter a team in the women's madison, due to a lack of competition experience in the event, coupled with the fact it would take place before the omnium.

The full Canadian track team of 13 cyclists (six men and seven women) was officially named on July 29, 2020, featuring Rio 2016 bronze medallists Allison Beveridge, Jasmin Duehring, and Georgia Simmerling in the women's team pursuit and Vincent De Haître, a speed skater and two-time Winter Olympian slated to compete at his first summer Games.

Sprint

Athlete	Event	Qualification		Round 1	Repechage 1	Round 2	Repechage 2	Round 3	Repechage 3	Quarterfinals	Semifinals	Final	Rank
Athlete	Event	Time Speed (km/h)	Rank	Opposition Time Speed (km/h)	Opposition Time Speed (km/h)	Opposition Time Speed (km/h)	Opposition Time Speed (km/h)	Opposition Time Speed (km/h)	Opposition Time Speed (km/h)	Opposition Time Speed (km/h)	Opposition Time Speed (km/h)	Opposition Time Speed (km/h)	Rank
Hugo Barrette	Men's sprint	9.596; 75.031	15 Q	Vigier (FRA); L	Sahrom (MAS); Rudyk (POL); L	Did not advance							19
Nick Wammes	Men's sprint	9.587; 75.102	12 Q	Boetticher (GER); W 10.228; 70.395	Bye	Dmitriev (ROC); L	Awang (MAS); L	Did not advance					14
Lauriane Genest	Women's sprint	10.460; 68.834	5 Q	Godby (USA); W 11.102; 64.853	Bye	Voinova (ROC); W 11.251; 63.994	Bye	Marchant (GBR); L	Gros (FRA); Voynova (ROC); W 10.968; 65.646	Mitchell (CAN); L	Bye	Braspennincx (NED); Friedrich (GER); Marchant (GBR); L	8
Kelsey Mitchell	Women's sprint	10.346; 69.592	2 Q	Basova (UKR); W 11.105; 64.836	Bye	McCulloch (AUS); W 11.198; 64.297	Bye	Andrews (NZL); W 10.883; 66.158	Bye	Genest (CAN); W 11.055; 65.129	Hinze (GER); W 11.068,L, W 11.055	Starikova (UKR); W 10.926, W 10.728	1st place, gold medalist(s)

Pursuit

Athlete	Event	Qualification		Semifinals		Final	
Athlete	Event	Time	Rank	Opponent Results	Rank	Opponent Results	Rank
Vincent De Haître; Michael Foley; Derek Gee; Jay Lamoureux	Men's team pursuit	3:50.455	6	Germany; 3:46.769 NR	5	Germany; 3:46.324 NR	5
Allison Beveridge; Ariane Bonhomme; Jasmin Duehring; Annie Foreman-Mackey; Georgia Simmerling	Women's team pursuit	4:15.832	8	France; 4:09.249 NR	4	United States; 4:10.552	4

Keirin

Athlete	Event	1st Round	Repechage	Quarterfinals	Semifinals	Final
Athlete	Event	Rank	Rank	Rank	Rank	Rank
Hugo Barrette	Men's keirin	DNF R	4	Did not advance		23
Nick Wammes	Men's keirin	5 R	5	Did not advance		27
Lauriane Genest	Women's keirin	1 Q	Bye	4 Q	3 Q	3rd place, bronze medalist(s)
Kelsey Mitchell	Women's keirin	1 Q	Bye	1 Q	2 Q	5

Omnium

Athlete	Event	Scratch race		Tempo race		Elimination race		Points race		Total	
Athlete	Event	Rank	Points	Rank	Points	Rank	Points	Rank	Points	Points	Rank
Allison Beveridge	Women's omnium	7	28	11	20	7	28	2	10	78	9

Madison

Athlete	Event	Points	Laps	Rank
Michael Foley; Derek Gee	Men's madison	DNF	–20	12

=== Mountain biking ===
Canadian mountain bikers qualified for one men's and two women's quota places as a result of the nation's tenth-place finish for men and fourth for women, respectively, in the UCI Olympic Ranking List of 16 May 2021. The team was named on July 6, 2021.

Athlete	Event	Time	Rank
Peter Disera	Men's cross-country	1:31:45	26
Catharine Pendrel	Women's cross-country	1:23:47	18
Haley Smith	Women's cross-country	LAP (1 lap)	29

=== BMX ===
Canadian riders qualified one men's and one women's quota place each as a result of the nation's top three eligible placement for men in the UCI BMX Individual Ranking List, and an eleventh-place finish for women in the UCI BMX Olympic Qualification Ranking List of 1 June 2021. The team was named on July 6, 2021.

Key

- Note–Ranks given for track events are within the athlete's heat only
- Q =Qualified for the next round

Athlete	Event	Quarterfinal		Semifinal		Final	
Athlete	Event	Points	Rank	Points	Rank	Time	Rank
James Palmer	Men's race	16	6	Did not advance			21
Drew Mechielsen	Women's race	13	4 Q	14	4 Q	46.883	8

== Diving ==
Canadian divers qualified for the following individual spots and synchronized teams through the 2019 FINA World Championships in Gwangju, South Korea and the 2021 FINA Diving World Cup in Tokyo. The synchronized diving teams that qualified, were automatically named to the team. The individual spots were awarded at the Canadian Diving Trials held in Toronto from June 28 to July 1, 2021. A total of 10 divers (four men and six women) qualified to compete.

Men

Athlete	Event	Preliminary		Semifinal		Final	
Athlete	Event	Points	Rank	Points	Rank	Points	Rank
Cédric Fofana	3 m springboard	225.35	29	Did not advance			
Rylan Wiens	10 m platform	366.70	19	Did not advance			
Nathan Zsombor-Murray	10 m platform	443.85	5 Q	397.85	13	Did not advance	
Vincent Riendeau; Nathan Zsombor-Murray	10 m synchronized platform	—N/a				405.00	5

Women

Athlete	Event	Preliminary		Semifinal		Final	
Athlete	Event	Points	Rank	Points	Rank	Points	Rank
Jennifer Abel	3 m springboard	332.40	3 Q	341.40	3 Q	297.45	8
Pamela Ware	3 m springboard	330.10	4 Q	245.10	18	Did not advance	
Meaghan Benfeito	10 m platform	331.85	5 Q	296.40	13	Did not advance	
Celina Toth	10 m platform	261.40	23	Did not advance			
Jennifer Abel; Mélissa Citrini-Beaulieu	3 m synchronized springboard	—N/a				300.78	2nd place, silver medalist(s)
Meaghan Benfeito; Caeli McKay	10 m synchronized platform	—N/a				299.16	4

== Equestrian ==
Canada qualified a team of six equestrians. Canadian equestrians qualified a full team in team dressage competition through the 2019 Pan American Games in Lima, Peru. Meanwhile, two eventing spots were awarded to the Canadian equestrians based on the results in the individual FEI Olympic rankings for Group E (North America and Caribbean).

On 17 December 2019, the show jumping team was officially dropped from the Games over a positive drug test by rider Nicole Walker for cocaine; hence, one individual jumping spot was awarded to the Canadian equestrians by securing the last of four available quotas at the Pan American Games.

The full team, consisted of two men and four women, was named on July 6, 2021.

=== Dressage ===
Athlete	Horse	Event	Grand Prix		Grand Prix Special		Grand Prix Freestyle		Overall	
Athlete	Horse	Event	Score	Rank	Score	Rank	Technical	Artistic	Score	Rank
Brittany Fraser-Beaulieu	All In	Individual	71.677	19 q	—N/a		72.607	80.200	76.404	18
Lindsay Kellock	Sebastien	Individual	65.404	50	—N/a		Did not advance			
Chris von Martels	Eclips	Individual	68.059	39	—N/a		Did not advance			
Brittany Fraser-Beaulieu; Lindsay Kellock; Chris von Martels	See above	Team	6605.5	11	Did not advance		—N/a		Did not advance	

Qualification Legend: Q =Qualified for the final; q =Qualified for the final as a lucky loser

=== Eventing ===
Athlete	Horse	Event	Dressage		Cross-country			Jumping						Total	
Athlete	Horse	Event	Dressage		Cross-country			Qualifier			Final			Total	
Athlete	Horse	Event	Penalties	Rank	Penalties	Total	Rank	Penalties	Total	Rank	Penalties	Total	Rank	Penalties	Rank
Colleen Loach	Qorry Blue D'Argouges	Individual	35.60	30	7.20	42.80	26	50.80	28	Did not advance					28
Jessica Phoenix	Pavarotti	Individual	Withdrew												

- Jessica Phoenix withdrew Pavarotti before the first trot-up prior to the start of the eventing competition.

=== Jumping ===
Athlete	Horse	Event	Qualification			Final		
Athlete	Horse	Event	Penalties	Time	Rank	Penalties	Time	Rank
Mario Deslauriers	Bardolina 2	Individual	0	84.76	=1 Q	13	88.51	22

== Fencing ==
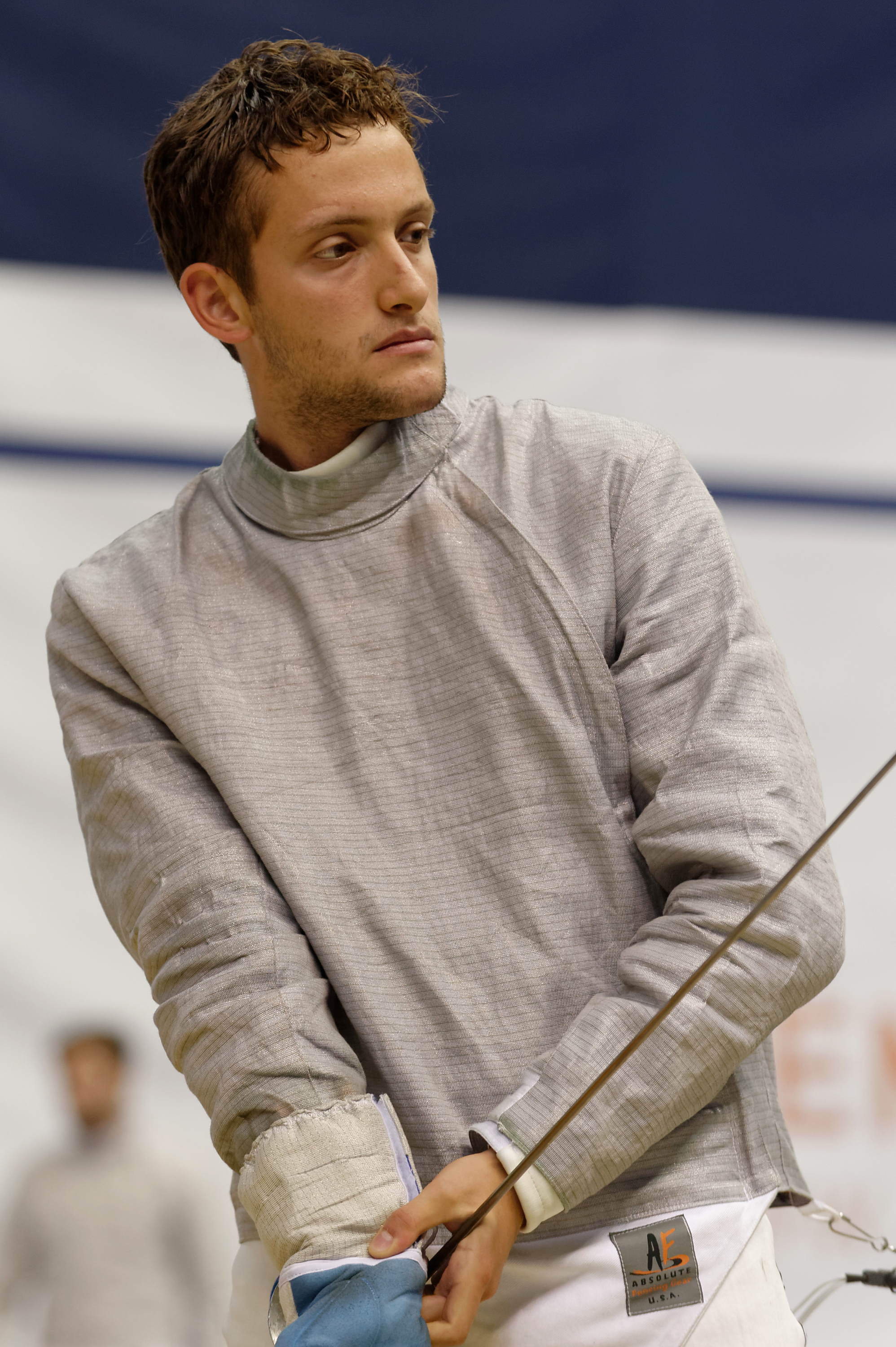
Shaul Gordon finished twenty-fifth in the men's individual sabre event.

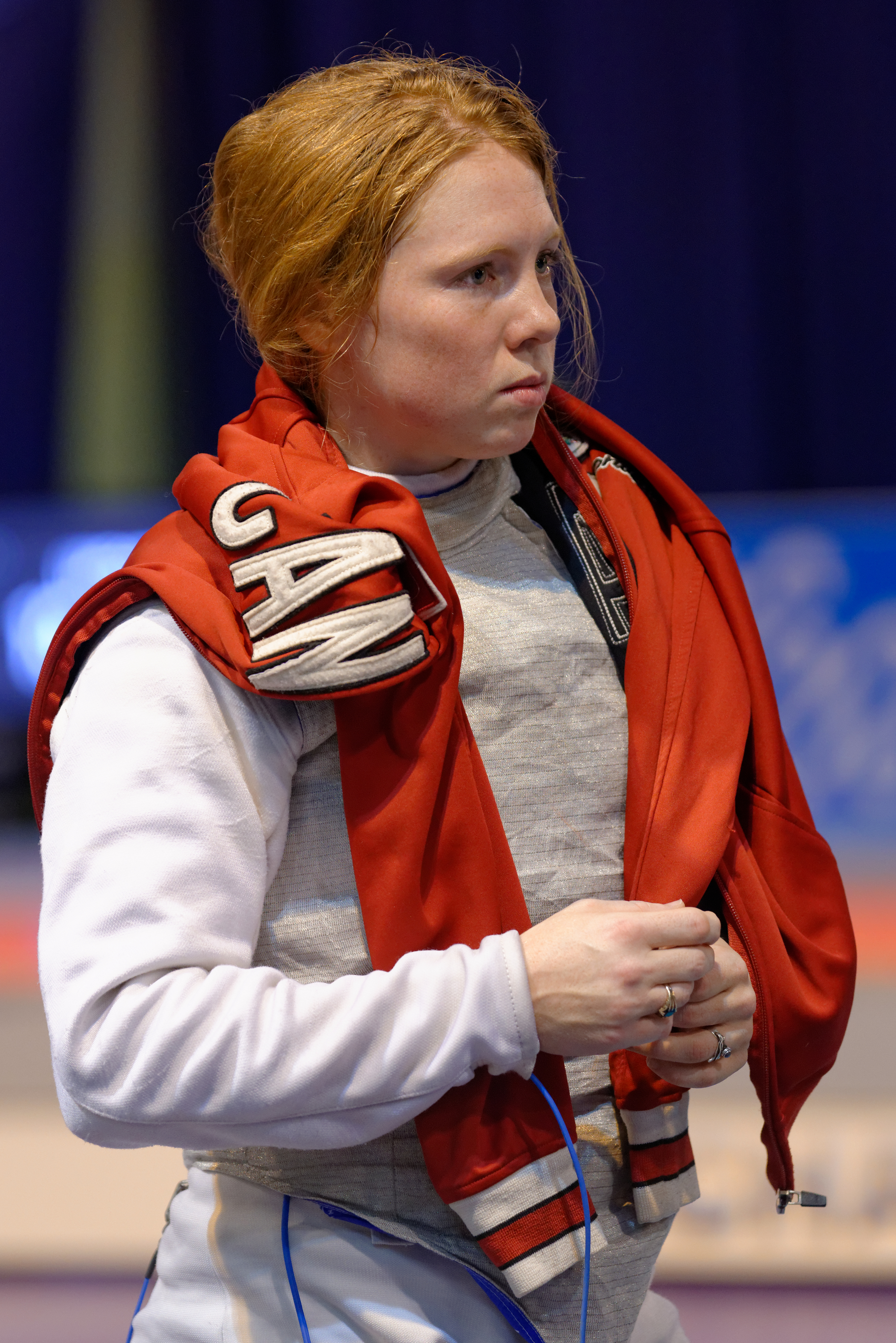
Kelleigh Ryan had the highest individual finish for the team, finishing in eighth place in the women's individual foil event.

Canada's fencing team consisted of nine athletes (five men and four women), the largest delegation in the sport since Beijing 2008. For the first time since Seoul 1988, Canadian fencers qualified a full team each in the men's and women's team foil at the Games, as the highest-ranked nation from the Americas outside the world's top four in the FIE Olympic Team Rankings. Shaul Gordon (men's sabre) and Gabriella Page (women's sabre) secured additional spots on the Canadian team as one of the two highest-ranked fencers vying for qualification from the Americas region in their respective individual events of the FIE Adjusted Official Rankings. Meanwhile, Marc-Antoine Blais-Belanger completed the Canadian roster by winning the individual men's épée competition at the Pan American Zonal Qualifier in San José, Costa Rica. The official team was named on May 20, 2021. Both substitutes for the team events, Blake Broszus and Kelleigh Ryan came on in the team event, which increased the team size to eleven athletes (six men and five women).

Men

Athlete	Event	Round of 64	Round of 32	Round of 16	Quarterfinal	Semifinal	Final / BM	Rank
Athlete	Event	Opposition Score	Opposition Score	Opposition Score	Opposition Score	Opposition Score	Opposition Score	
Marc-Antoine Blais Bélanger	Épée	Dong (CHN); L 7–15	Did not advance					34
Alex Cai	Foil	Joppich (GER); L 12–15	Did not advance					36
Eli Schenkel	Foil	Bye	Cassarà (ITA); L 11–15	Did not advance				30
Maximilien Van Haaster	Foil	Bye	Choi (HKG); L 10–15	Did not advance				28
Alex Cai; Maximilien Van Haaster; Eli Schenkel; Blake Broszus*	Team foil	—N/a		Germany; L 31–45	Did not advance			9
Shaul Gordon	Sabre	Bye	Abedini (IRI); L 10–15	Did not advance				25

- Broszus replaced Schenkel during the team competition.

Women

Athlete	Event	Round of 64	Round of 32	Round of 16	Quarterfinal	Semifinal	Final / BM	Rank
Athlete	Event	Opposition Score	Opposition Score	Opposition Score	Opposition Score	Opposition Score	Opposition Score	
Jessica Guo	Foil	Bye	Blaze (FRA); W 15–12	Errigo (ITA); L 8–15	Did not advance			13
Eleanor Harvey	Foil	Bye	Ranvier (FRA); W 15–9	Kiefer (USA); L 13–15	Did not advance			16
Kelleigh Ryan	Foil	Bye	Azuma (JPN); W 12–11	Zagidullina (ROC); W 15–9	Korobeynikova (ROC); L 11–15	Did not advance		8
Jessica Guo; Eleanor Harvey; Kelleigh Ryan; Alanna Goldie*	Team foil	—N/a			France; L 29–45	Classification semifinal Hungary; W 45–33	5th place final Japan; W 45–31	5
Gabriella Page	Sabre	Bye	Zagunis (USA); L 3–15	Did not advance				27

- Goldie replaced Ryan during the team competition.

== Field hockey ==
Summary

Key:

- FT – After full-time.
- P – Match decided by penalty-shootout.

Team	Event	Group stage						Quarterfinal	Semifinal	Final / BM	
Team	Event	Opposition Score	Opposition Score	Opposition Score	Opposition Score	Opposition Score	Rank	Opposition Score	Opposition Score	Opposition Score	Rank
Canada men's	Men's tournament	Germany; L 1–7	Great Britain; L 1–3	Netherlands; L 2–4	Belgium; L 1–9	South Africa; D 4–4	6	Did not advance			12

=== Men's tournament ===
Canada men's field hockey team qualified by securing one of the seven quotas available as part of the 2019 FIH Olympic Qualifiers. The team defeated Ireland in a two-legged playoff in Vancouver.

Team roster

Canada's team roster of 16 athletes was named on June 28, 2021. Before the expansion of each roster, the alternates were Taylor Curran and Brandon Pereira.

Head coach: (Netherlands) Pasha Gademan

No.	Pos.	Player	Date of birth (age)	Caps	Goals	Club
1	MF	Floris Van Son	5 February 1992 (aged 29)	35	7	(Netherlands) AMVJ
3	DF	Brandon Pereira	30 April 1996 (aged 25)	61	0	(Canada) United Brothers
4	DF	Scott Tupper (Captain)	16 December 1986 (aged 34)	315	126	(Canada) West Vancouver
7	MF	Gabriel Ho-Garcia	19 May 1993 (aged 28)	133	19	(Canada) Burnaby Lakers
8	MF	Oliver Scholfield	11 September 1993 (aged 27)	71	16	(Canada) Vancouver Hawks
10	FW	Keegan Pereira	8 September 1991 (aged 29)	182	36	(Canada) India Club
13	MF	Brendan Guraliuk	14 May 2000 (aged 21)	7	0	(Canada) UBC
16	DF	Gordon Johnston	30 January 1993 (aged 28)	179	51	(Canada) Vancouver Hawks
17	DF	Brenden Bissett	28 January 1993 (aged 28)	139	11	(Canada) Vancouver Hawks
18	FW	Jamie Wallace	14 September 1999 (aged 21)	46	13	(Canada) UBC
19	FW	Mark Pearson	18 June 1987 (aged 34)	277	67	(Canada) West Vancouver
20	FW	Fin Boothroyd	9 March 1999 (aged 22)	23	4	(Canada) West Vancouver
21	FW	Matthew Sarmento	23 June 1991 (aged 30)	121	26	(Canada) Vancouver Hawks
22	DF	John Smythe	31 August 1989 (aged 31)	121	3	(Canada) Vancouver Hawks
24	DF	James Kirkpatrick	29 March 1991 (aged 30)	100	9	(Canada) West Vancouver
27	MF	Sukhi Panesar	26 December 1993 (aged 27)	151	7	(Canada) United Brothers
29	MF	Taylor Curran	19 May 1992 (aged 29)	185	7	(Canada) West Vancouver
31	GK	Antoni Kindler	16 May 1988 (aged 33)	97	0	(Canada) West Vancouver

Group B

Pos	Team	Pld	W	D	L	GF	GA	GD	Pts	Qualification
1	Belgium	5	4	1	0	26	9	+17	13	Quarter-finals
2	Germany	5	3	0	2	19	10	+9	9	Quarter-finals
3	Great Britain	5	2	2	1	11	11	0	8	Quarter-finals
4	Netherlands	5	2	1	2	13	13	0	7	Quarter-finals
5	South Africa	5	1	1	3	16	24	−8	4	
6	Canada	5	0	1	4	9	27	−18	1	

Source: Tokyo 2020 and FIH
Rules for classification: 1) points; 2) matches won; 3) goal difference; 4) goals for; 5) head-to-head result; 6) field goals scored.

24 July 2021
19:00
v

Canada	1–7	Germany
K. Pereira 16'	Report	Windfeder 11', 28'; Rühr 22', 25'; Häner 44'; Bosserhoff 59'; Grambusch 60'

South Pitch
Umpires:
Peter Wright (RSA)
Francisco Vázquez (ESP)

26 July 2021
11:45
v

Great Britain	3–1	Canada
Ansell 33', 57'; Ward 41'	Report	Van Son 51'

North Pitch
Umpires:
Lim Hong Zhen (SGP)
Marcin Grochal (POL)

27 July 2021
20:45
v

Netherlands	4–2	Canada
Bakker 1'; Brinkman 4'; De Mol 50'; Pruyser 60'	Report	Wallace 10'; Tupper 53'

North Pitch
Umpires:
Javed Shaikh (IND)
David Tomlinson (NZL)

29 July 2021
10:00
v

Belgium	9–1	Canada
Hendrickx 12', 40'; Dockier 29', 32'; Denayer 39'; Gougnard 43', 45'; Boon 51'; Van Aubel 55'	Report	Pearson 15'

South Pitch
Umpires:
Simon Taylor (NZL)
Peter Wright (RSA)

30 July 2021
12:15
v

Canada	4–4	South Africa
Pearson 11'; K. Pereira 17'; Boothroyd 42'; Ho-Garcia 59'	Report	Ntuli 2'; Spooner 9'; Guise-Brown 34'; Mvimbi 58'

South Pitch
Umpires:
Germán Montes de Oca (ARG)
Raghu Prasad (IND)

== Football (soccer) ==
Summary

Key:

- A.E.T – After extra time.
- P – Match decided by penalty-shootout.

Team	Event	Group stage				Quarterfinal	Semifinal	Final / BM	
Team	Event	Opposition Score	Opposition Score	Opposition Score	Rank	Opposition Score	Opposition Score	Opposition Score	Rank
Canada women's	Women's tournament	Japan; D 1–1	Chile; W 2–1	Great Britain; D 1–1	2 Q	Brazil; W 0–0 (a.e.t.) 4–3^{P}	United States; W 1–0	Sweden; W 1–1 (a.e.t.) 3–2^{P}	1st place, gold medalist(s)

=== Women's tournament ===
Canada women's football team qualified for the Olympics by reaching the finals of the 2020 CONCACAF Women's Olympic Qualifying Championship in Carson, California. The team went onto win the gold medal, marking the first women's team sport gold medal earned by the country ever, and the first overall since 1908.

Team roster

The final squad of 18 athletes and four alternates was announced on June 23, 2021. Those listed with numbers 19 to 22 were the alternates. The final squad of 18 athletes and four alternates was announced on 23 June 2021. Those listed with numbers 19 to 22 were the alternates.

Head coach: (United Kingdom) Bev Priestman

No.	Pos.	Player	Date of birth (age)	Caps	Goals	Club
1	GK	Stephanie Labbé	10 October 1986 (aged 34)	73	0	(Swedish Football Association) Rosengård
2	DF	Allysha Chapman	25 January 1989 (aged 32)	79	1	(United States Soccer Federation) Houston Dash
3	DF	Kadeisha Buchanan	5 November 1995 (aged 25)	103	4	(French Football Federation) Lyon
4	DF	Shelina Zadorsky	24 October 1992 (aged 28)	72	2	(The Football Association) Tottenham Hotspur
5	MF	Quinn	11 August 1995 (aged 25)	63	5	(United States Soccer Federation) OL Reign
6	FW	Deanne Rose	3 March 1999 (aged 22)	55	10	(United States Soccer Federation) Florida Gators
7	MF	Julia Grosso	29 August 2000 (aged 20)	24	0	(United States Soccer Federation) Texas Longhorns
8	DF	Jayde Riviere	22 January 2001 (aged 20)	21	1	(United States Soccer Federation) Michigan Wolverines
9	FW	Adriana Leon	2 October 1992 (aged 28)	71	19	(The Football Association) West Ham United
10	DF	Ashley Lawrence	11 June 1995 (aged 26)	95	7	(French Football Federation) Paris Saint-Germain
11	MF	Desiree Scott	31 July 1987 (aged 33)	161	0	(United States Soccer Federation) Kansas City
12	FW	Christine Sinclair (captain)	12 June 1983 (aged 38)	299	186	(United States Soccer Federation) Portland Thorns
13	FW	Évelyne Viens	6 February 1997 (aged 24)	7	2	(United States Soccer Federation) NJ/NY Gotham
14	DF	Vanessa Gilles	11 March 1996 (aged 25)	8	0	(French Football Federation) Bordeaux
15	FW	Nichelle Prince	19 February 1995 (aged 26)	66	12	(United States Soccer Federation) Houston Dash
16	FW	Janine Beckie	20 August 1994 (aged 26)	75	31	(The Football Association) Manchester City
17	MF	Jessie Fleming	11 March 1998 (aged 23)	84	11	(The Football Association) Chelsea
18	GK	Kailen Sheridan	16 July 1995 (aged 26)	10	0	(United States Soccer Federation) NJ/NY Gotham
19	FW	Jordyn Huitema	8 May 2001 (aged 20)	37	13	(French Football Federation) Paris Saint-Germain
20	MF	Sophie Schmidt	28 June 1988 (aged 33)	205	19	(United States Soccer Federation) Houston Dash
21	DF	Gabrielle Carle	12 October 1998 (aged 22)	25	1	(United States Soccer Federation) Florida State Seminoles
22	GK	Erin McLeod	26 February 1983 (aged 38)	118	0	(United States Soccer Federation) Orlando Pride

Group E

Pos	Team	Pld	W	D	L	GF	GA	GD	Pts	Qualification
1	Great Britain	3	2	1	0	4	1	+3	7	Advance to knockout stage
2	Canada	3	1	2	0	4	3	+1	5	Advance to knockout stage
3	Japan (H)	3	1	1	1	2	2	0	4	Advance to knockout stage
4	Chile	3	0	0	3	1	5	−4	0	

Source: TOCOG and FIFA
Rules for classification: Group stage tiebreakers
(H) Hosts
21 July 2021
19:30

Japan	1–1	Canada
Iwabuchi 84'	Report (TOCOG); Report (FIFA)	Sinclair 6'

Sapporo Dome, Sapporo
Attendance: 0
Referee: Edina Alves Batista (Brazil)

24 July 2021
16:30

Chile	1–2	Canada
Araya 57' (pen.)	Report (TOCOG); Report (FIFA)	Beckie 39', 47'

Sapporo Dome, Sapporo
Attendance: 0
Referee: Esther Staubli (Switzerland)

27 July 2021
20:00

Canada	1–1	Great Britain
Leon 55'	Report (TOCOG); Report (FIFA)	Prince 85' (o.g.)

Kashima Stadium, Kashima
Attendance: 0
Referee: Kateryna Monzul (Ukraine)

Quarterfinals

30 July 2021
17:00

Canada	0–0 (a.e.t.)	Brazil
	Report (TOCOG); Report (FIFA)
Penalties
Sinclair (penalty missed); Fleming (penalty scored); Lawrence (penalty scored); Leon (penalty scored); Gilles (penalty scored)	4–3	(penalty scored) Marta; (penalty scored) Debinha; (penalty scored) Érika; (penalty missed) Andressa; (penalty missed) Rafaelle

Miyagi Stadium, Rifu
Attendance: 3,403
Referee: Stéphanie Frappart (France)

Semifinals

2 August 2021
17:00

United States	0–1	Canada
	Report (TOCOG); Report (FIFA)	Fleming 75' (pen.)

Kashima Stadium, Kashima
Attendance: 0
Referee: Kateryna Monzul (Ukraine)

Gold medal match

6 August 2021
21:00

Sweden	1–1 (a.e.t.)	Canada
Blackstenius 34'	Report (TOCOG); Report (FIFA)	Fleming 68' (pen.)
Penalties
Asllani (penalty missed); Björn (penalty scored); Schough (penalty scored); Anvegård (penalty missed); Seger (penalty missed); Andersson (penalty missed)	2–3	(penalty scored) Fleming; (penalty missed) Lawrence; (penalty missed) Gilles; (penalty missed) Leon; (penalty scored) Rose; (penalty scored) Grosso

International Stadium Yokohama, Yokohama
Referee: Anastasia Pustovoitova (Russia)

== Golf ==
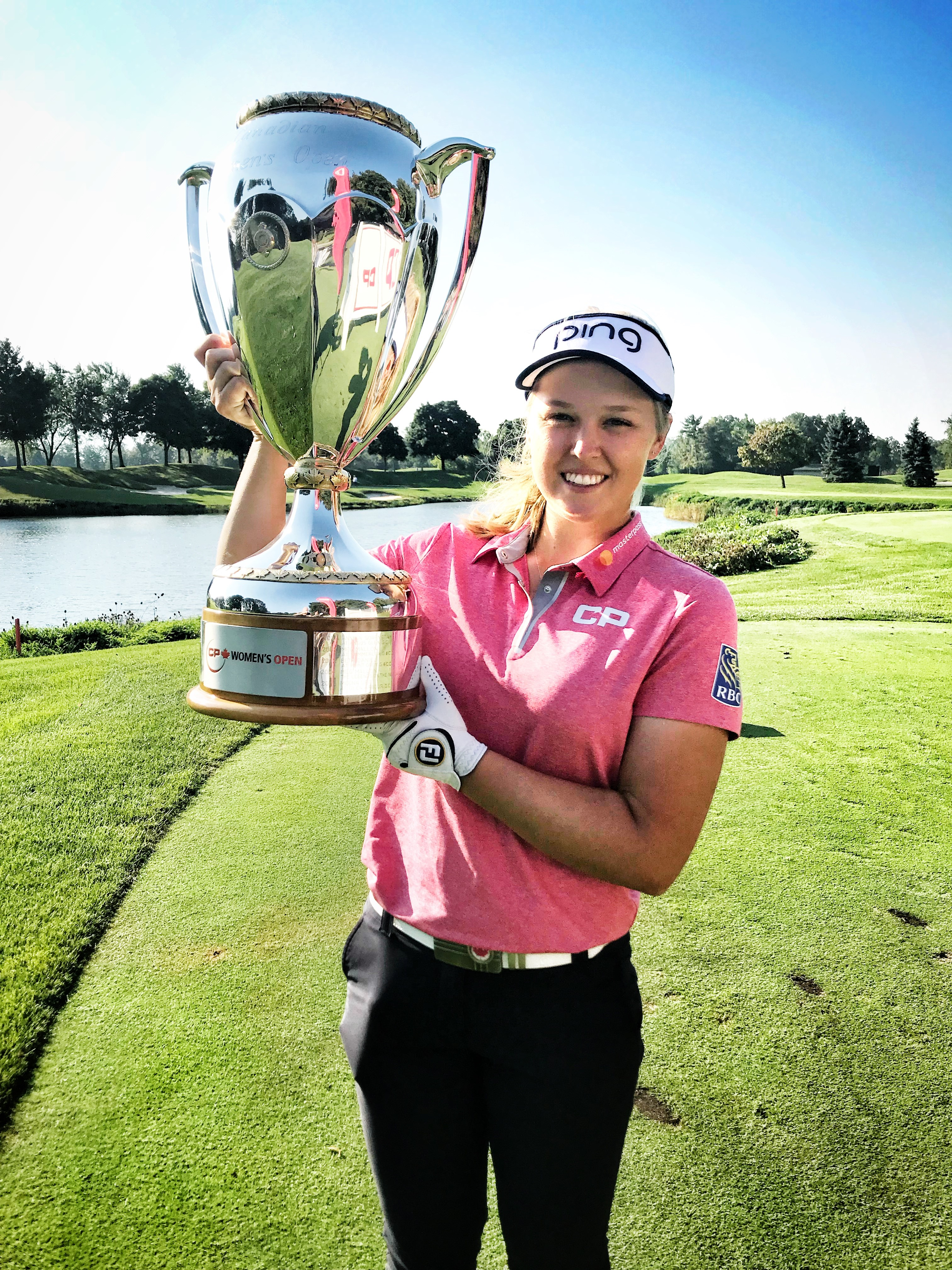
Brooke Henderson, pictured in 2018, represented the country in the women's event.

Canada entered four golfers, two per gender. All four golfers qualified directly among the top 60 eligible players for their respective events. The team was officially named on June 29, 2021.

Athlete	Event	Round 1	Round 2	Round 3	Round 4	Total		
Athlete	Event	Score	Score	Score	Score	Score	Par	Rank
Corey Conners	Men's	69	71	66	65	271	−13	13
Mackenzie Hughes	Men's	69	72	65	75	281	−3	50
Brooke Henderson	Women's	74	68	71	67	280	−4	29
Alena Sharp	Women's	74	71	69	75	289	+5	49

== Gymnastics ==
=== Artistic ===
Canada qualified a team of five artistic gymnasts (one man and four women). The women's team secured a place by finishing second out of nine nations eligible for qualification in the team all-around at the 2019 World Artistic Gymnastics Championships in Stuttgart, Germany. Meanwhile, an additional berth was awarded to one male gymnast, after René Cournoyer received a quota for being the highest non-qualified gymnast through reallocation. The team was officially named on June 17, 2021.

Men

Athlete	Event	Qualification								Final							
Athlete	Event	Apparatus						Total	Rank	Apparatus						Total	Rank
Athlete	Event	F	PH	R	V	PB	HB	Total	Rank	F	PH	R	V	PB	HB	Total	Rank
René Cournoyer	All-around	11.766	12.800	13.666	13.866	12.333	13.266	77.697	55	Did not advance							

Women
Team

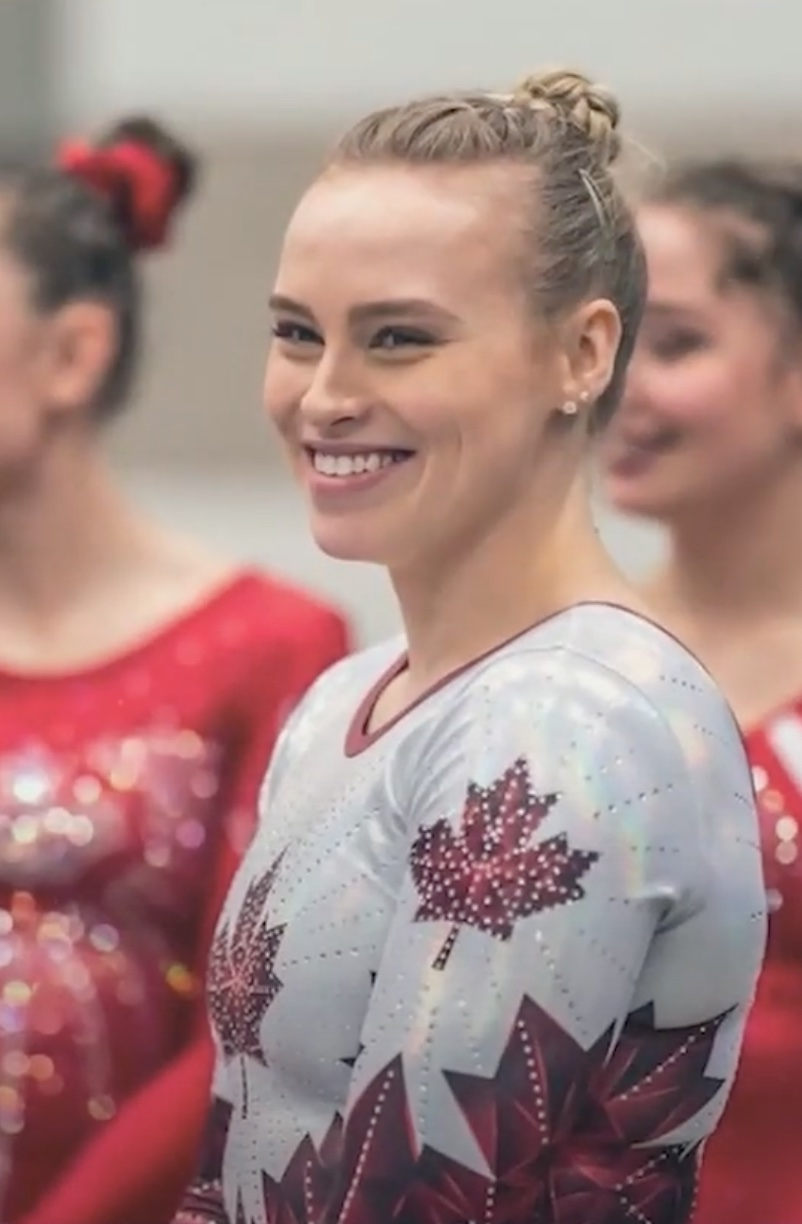
Ellie Black had the highest placement, fourth in the balance beam.

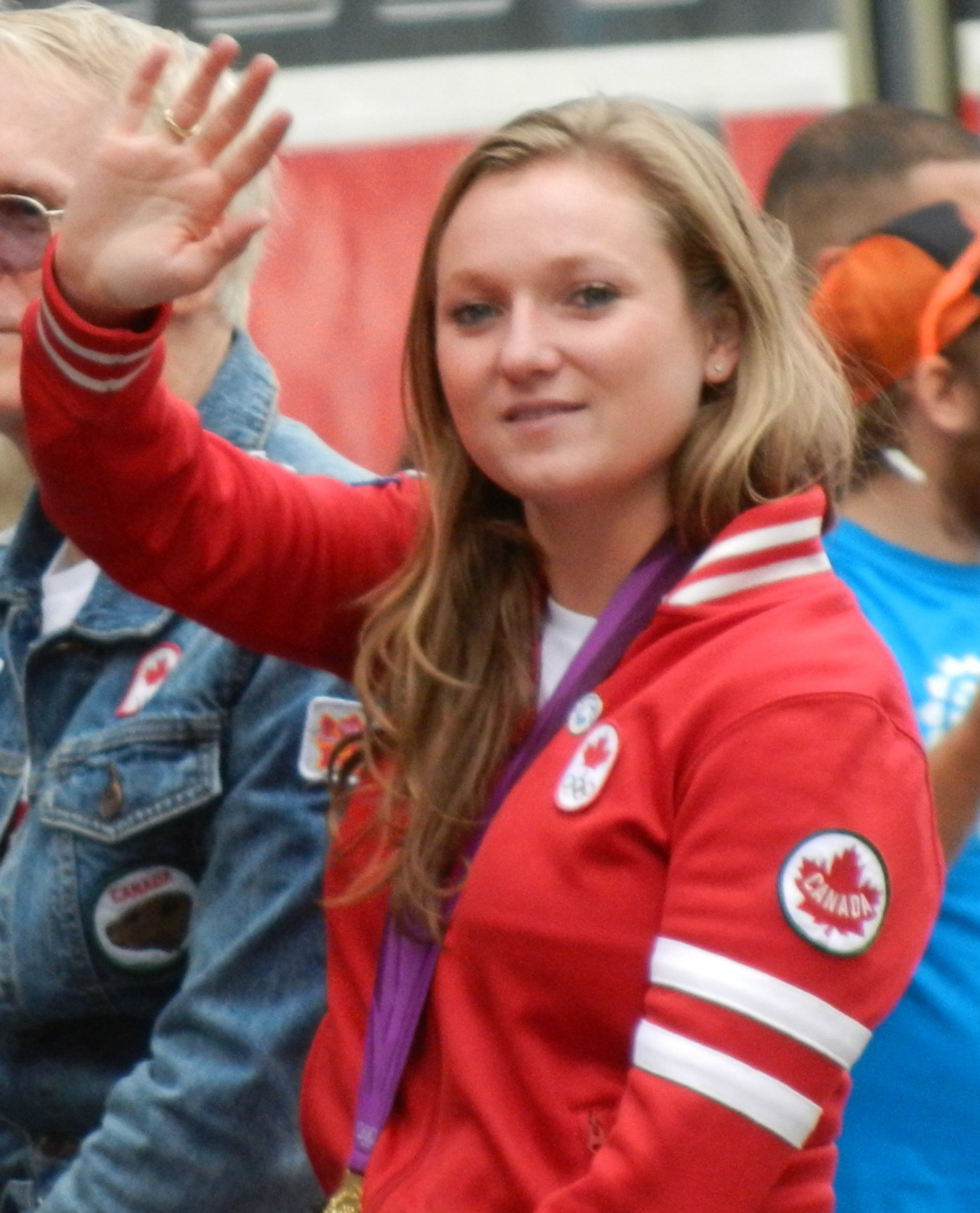
Two time defending champion, Rosie MacLennan finished in fourth.

Athlete	Event	Qualification						Final					
Athlete	Event	Apparatus				Total	Rank	Apparatus				Total	Rank
Athlete	Event	V	UB	BB	F	Total	Rank	V	UB	BB	F	Total	Rank
Ellie Black	Team	14.533	12.800	14.100 Q	~~12.266~~	53.699 Q	24	Did not advance					
Brooklyn Moors	Team	14.133	13.000	13.300	13.533	53.966 Q	22	Did not advance					
Shallon Olsen	Team	14.966 Q	~~11.900~~	12.066	13.033	51.965	46	Did not advance					
Ava Stewart	Team	~~12.933~~	12.900	~~12.000~~	12.600	50.433	58	Did not advance					
Total	Team	43.632	38.700	39.466	39.166	160.964	10	Did not advance					

Individual

Athlete	Event	Qualification						Final					
Athlete	Event	Apparatus				Total	Rank	Apparatus				Total	Rank
Athlete	Event	V	UB	BB	F	Total	Rank	V	UB	BB	F	Total	Rank
Ellie Black	All-around	See team results						Withdrew					
Brooklyn Moors	All-around	See team results						14.300	13.000	12.433	13.566	53.299	16
Ellie Black	Balance beam	14.100	—N/a			14.100	6 Q	13.866	—N/a			13.866	4
Shallon Olsen	Vault	14.966	—N/a			14.966	6 Q	—N/a				14.550	7

=== Trampoline ===
Canada qualified one gymnast for the women's trampoline by finishing in the top eight at the 2019 World Championships in Tokyo, Japan. Samantha Smith qualified an additional spot through the 2019-2020 Trampoline World Cup series.

Athlete	Event	Qualification		Final	
Athlete	Event	Score	Rank	Score	Rank
Rosie MacLennan	Women's	104.435	4 Q	55.460	4
Samantha Smith	Women's	59.545	14	Did not advance	

== Judo ==
Canada qualified six judoka (three per gender). Five judoka were ranked among the top 18 eligible judokas in the IJF World Ranking List of June 28, 2021, while Ecaterina Guica in the women's (52 kg) earned a continental quota spot from the Pan American region as Canada's top-ranked judoka outside of a direct qualifying position. Kelita Zupancic was set to compete, but eventually withdrew and retired because of her pregnancy. The team was officially named on June 30, 2021.

Athlete	Event	Round of 32	Round of 16	Quarterfinals	Semifinals	Repechage	Final / BM	Rank
Athlete	Event	Opposition Result	Opposition Result	Opposition Result	Opposition Result	Opposition Result	Opposition Result	Rank
Arthur Margelidon	Men's 73 kg	Hamad (KSA); W 01–00	Smagulov (KAZ); W 10–01	Shavdatuashvili (GEO); L 00–10	Did not advance	Butbul (ISR); W 10s2–00	Tsogtbaatar (MGL); L 00–10	5
Antoine Valois-Fortier	Men's 81 kg	Ntanatsidis (GRE); W 10–00	Khubetsov (ROC); L 00–11	Did not advance				9
Shady El Nahas	Men's 100 kg	Remarenco (UAE); W 10–00	Kotsoiev (AZE); W 10–00	Liparteliani (GEO); L 00–10	Did not advance	Paltchik (ISR); W 10–00	Fonseca (POR); L 00–01	5
Ecaterina Guica	Women's 52 kg	Van Snick (BEL); L 00–11	Did not advance					17
Jessica Klimkait	Women's 57 kg	Bye	Ilieva (BUL); W 10–00	Kowalczyk (POL); W 10–00	Cysique (FRA); L 00–10	Bye	Kajzer (SLO); W 11–00	3rd place, bronze medalist(s)
Catherine Beauchemin-Pinard	Women's 63 kg	Olsen (DEN); W 10–00	Krssakova (AUT); W 10–00	Quadros (BRA); W 10–00	Agbegnenou (FRA); L 00–01	Bye	Barrios (VEN); W 01–00	3rd place, bronze medalist(s)

- Both Margelidon and Valois-Fortier received byes in the preliminary round.

== Karate ==
Canada qualified one male karateka after Daniel Gaysinsky finished in the top three at the 2021 Karate World Olympic Qualification Tournament in Paris, France. With the sport making its first appearance at the Games, this will also mark Canada's Olympic sport debut. Gaysinsky was officially named to the team on July 5, 2021. Gaysinsky would go onto finish in seventh place (out of ten competitors) after winning and drawing one match, while losing two in the group stage. Gaysinsky did not advance to the semifinals.

Athlete	Event	Round robin					Semifinals	Final	Rank
Athlete	Event	Opposition Result	Opposition Result	Opposition Result	Opposition Result	Rank	Opposition Result	Opposition Result	Rank
Daniel Gaysinsky	Men's +75 kg	Irr (USA); D 0–0	Kvesić (CRO); W 4–1	Hamedi (KSA); L 3–10	Ganjzadeh (IRI); L 1–2	4	Did not advance		7

== Rowing ==
Canada qualified ten boats (29 rowers) for each of the following rowing classes. Six of them were awarded at the 2019 FISA World Championships in Ottensheim, Austria, with the other three obtaining the available slots in the men's single sculls, men's four, and men's lightweight double sculls at the 2021 FISA Final Qualification Regatta in Lucerne, Switzerland.

The women's lightweight double sculls boat qualification was awarded to the Canadian rowing team through its eighth-place finish at the 2019 Worlds, after New Zealand declined its quota place.

On June 15, 2021, the crews for the 10 boat classes (29 rowers) were named, with this being the most boat classes team Canada has qualified for the Olympics since 1996, and the largest contingent of athletes since the 2012 games.

Men

Athlete	Event	Heats		Repechage		Quarterfinals		Semifinals		Final	
Athlete	Event	Time	Rank	Time	Rank	Time	Rank	Time	Rank	Time	Rank
Trevor Jones	Single sculls	7:04.12	1 QF	Bye		7:17.65	2 SA/B	7:06.18	6 FB	6:48.51	9
Patrick Keane; Maxwell Lattimer	Lightweight double sculls	6:27.54	3 R	6:36.79	2 SA/B	—N/a		6:18.29	5 FB	6:17.60	10
Kai Langerfeld; Conlin McCabe	Pair	6:40.99	3 SA/B	Bye		—N/a		6:19.15	3 FA	6:20.43	4
Jakub Buczek; Luke Gadsdon; Gavin Stone; Will Crothers	Four	6:05.47	5 R	6:15.86	4 FB	—N/a				5:58.29	8

Women

Athlete	Event	Heats		Repechage		Quarterfinals		Semifinals		Final	
Athlete	Event	Time	Rank	Time	Rank	Time	Rank	Time	Rank	Time	Rank
Carling Zeeman	Single sculls	7:40.72	2 QF	Bye		7:57.58	2 SA/B	7:38.28	5 FB	7:29.59	8
Jessica Sevick; Gabrielle Smith	Double sculls	6:57.69	2 SA/B	Bye		—N/a		7:09.44	2 FA	6:53.19	6
Jennifer Casson; Jill Moffatt	Lightweight double sculls	7:11.30	2 SA/B	Bye		—N/a		7:00.82	6 FB	6:59.72	12
Caileigh Filmer; Hillary Janssens	Pair	7:18.34	1 SA/B	Bye		—N/a		6:49.46	3 FA	6:52.10	3rd place, bronze medalist(s)
Stephanie Grauer; Nicole Hare; Jennifer Martins; Kristina Walker	Four	6:40.07	3 R	6:51.71	4 FB	—N/a				6:35.13	10
Susanne Grainger; Kasia Gruchalla-Wesierski; Madison Mailey; Sydney Payne; Andrea Proske; Lisa Roman; Christine Roper; Avalon Wasteneys; Kristen Kit c	Eight	6:07.97	2 R	5:53.73	2 FA	—N/a				5:59.13	1st place, gold medalist(s)

Qualification Legend: FA=Final A (medal); FB=Final B (non-medal); FC=Final C (non-medal); FD=Final D (non-medal); FE=Final E (non-medal); FF=Final F (non-medal); SA/B=Semifinals A/B; SC/D=Semifinals C/D; SE/F=Semifinals E/F; QF=Quarterfinals; R=Repechage
- Results given are within the heat.

== Rugby sevens ==
Summary

Team	Event	Group stage				Quarterfinal/Classification	Semifinal/Classification	Final / BM	
Team	Event	Opposition Score	Opposition Score	Opposition Score	Rank	Opposition Score	Opposition Score	Opposition Score	Rank
Canada men's	Men's tournament	Great Britain; L 0–24	Fiji; L 14–28	Japan; W 36–12	3 Q	New Zealand; L 10–21	United States; L 14–21	Australia; L 7–26	8
Canada women's	Women's tournament	Brazil; W 33–0	Fiji; L 12–26	France; L 31–0	9	—N/a	Brazil; W 45–0	Kenya; W 24–10	9

=== Men's tournament ===
Canada national rugby sevens team qualified by winning the 2019 RAN Sevens tournament in George Town, Cayman Islands.

Team roster

Canada's roster of 12 athletes and one alternate was named on June 25, 2021.

Head coach: Henry Paul

- Phil Berna
- Connor Braid
- Andrew Coe (alternate)
- Justin Douglas
- Mike Fuailefau
- Lucas Hammond
- Nathan Hirayama (C)
- Harry Jones (C)
- Patrick Kay
- Matt Mullins
- Theo Sauder
- Jake Thiel
- Conor Trainor

Group B

Pos	Team	Pld	W	D	L	PF	PA	PD	Pts	Qualification
1	Fiji	3	3	0	0	85	40	+45	9	Quarter-finals
2	Great Britain	3	2	0	1	65	33	+32	7	Quarter-finals
3	Canada	3	1	0	2	50	64	−14	5	Quarter-finals
4	Japan (H)	3	0	0	3	31	94	−63	3	

Source: Tokyo 2020 and World Rugby
Rules for classification: 1) Points; 2) Head-to-head result; 3) Point difference; 4) Points scored.
(H) Hosts

26 July 2021
9:30

Great Britain	24–0	Canada
Try: Norton (2) 7' c, 8' m McCann 11' c Fergusson 7' m Con: Bibby (2/3) 7', 12'; Fergusson (0/1)	(Tokyo 2020)

Tokyo Stadium, Tokyo
Attendance: 0
Referee: James Doleman (New Zealand)

26 July 2021
17:00

Fiji	28–14	Canada
Try: Bolaca 1' c Wainiqolo 4' c Tuimaba 11' c Tuivuaka 14' c Con: Bolaca (2/2) 2', 4'; Nacuqu (2/2) 12', 14'	(Tokyo 2020)	Try: Hirayama 7' c Douglas 12' c Con: Hirayama (2/2) 7', 13'

Tokyo Stadium, Tokyo
Attendance: 0
Referee: Jordan Way (Australia)

27 July 2021
9:00

Canada	36–12	Japan
Try: Braid (3) 2' c, 3' m, 9' m Sauder 5' c Berna 10' m Douglas 12' c Con: Hirayama (2/5) 2', 5'; Kay (1/1) 12'	(Tokyo 2020)	Try: Hano 8' m Matsui 13' c Con: Bourke (0/1); Goya (1/1) 13'

Tokyo Stadium, Tokyo
Attendance: 0
Referee: Damon Murphy (Australia)

Quarterfinals

27 July 2021
17:30

New Zealand	21–10	Canada
Try: Knewstubb 4' c Curry (2) 6' c, 7' c Con: Knewstubb (2/2) 4', 6'; Curry (1/1) 7'	(Tokyo 2020)	Try: Kay 13' m Jones 14' m Con: Kay (0/2)

Tokyo Stadium, Tokyo
Attendance: 0
Referee: Jordan Way (Australia)

5–8th place playoff

28 July 2021
10:00

Canada	14–21	United States
Try: Jones 6' c Douglas 13' c Con: Hirayama (2/2) 7', 13'	(Tokyo 2020)	Try: Isles (2) 2' c, 14' c Iosefo 12' c Con: Hughes (3/3) 2', 12', 14'

Tokyo Stadium, Tokyo
Attendance: 0
Referee: Francisco González (Uruguay)

7th place match

28 July 2021
16:30

Canada	7–26	Australia
Try: Braid 3' c Con: Hirayama (1/1) 3'	(Tokyo 2020)	Try: Lawson 1' c Anderson 6' m Malouf 9' c Miller 12' c Con: Coward (1/1) 2'; Anderson (0/1); Longbottom (2/2) 9', 12'

Tokyo Stadium, Tokyo
Attendance: 0
Referee: Paulo Duarte (Portugal)

=== Women's tournament ===
Canada women's national rugby sevens team qualified by securing one of the top four spots during the 2018–19 World Rugby Women's Sevens Series.

Team roster

Canada's roster of 12 athletes and one alternate was named on June 25, 2021.

Head coach: Mick Byrne

- Elissa Alarie
- Olivia Apps (alternate)
- Britt Benn
- Pamphinette Buisa
- Bianca Farella
- Julia Greenshields
- Ghislaine Landry (c)
- Kaili Lukan
- Kayla Moleschi
- Breanne Nicholas
- Karen Paquin
- Keyara Wardley
- Charity Williams

Group B

Pos	Team	Pld	W	D	L	PF	PA	PD	Pts	Qualification
1	France	3	3	0	0	83	10	+73	9	Quarter-finals
2	Fiji	3	2	0	1	72	29	+43	7	Quarter-finals
3	Canada	3	1	0	2	45	57	−12	5	
4	Brazil	3	0	0	3	10	114	−104	3	

Source: Tokyo 2020 and World Rugby
Rules for classification: 1) Points; 2) Head-to-head result; 3) Point difference; 4) Points scored.

29 July 2021
9:30

Canada	33–0	Brazil
Try: Williams 6' c Wardley (2) 9' c, 14' +1 m Paquin 11' c Landry 13' c Con: Landry (4/5) 7', 9', 11', 13'	(Tokyo 2020)

Tokyo Stadium, Tokyo

29 July 2021
16:30

Canada	12–26	Fiji
Try: Landry 7' c Moleschi 13' m Con: Landry (1/1) 7'	(Tokyo 2020)	Try: Ulunisau (2) 1' c, 8' m Naimasi 3' c Riwai 5' c Con: Riwai (3/4) 1', 4', 6'

Tokyo Stadium, Tokyo

30 July 2021
9:30

Canada	0–31	France
	(Tokyo 2020)	Try: Okemba 1' c Ciofani 4' m Ulutule 7' c Neisen 11' c Jacquet 14' m Con: Ulutule (2/2) 1', 7'; Izar (1/2) 11'; Drouin (0/1)

Tokyo Stadium, Tokyo

Ninth to twelfth place playoff

30 July 2021
16:30

Canada	45–0	Brazil
Try: Williams (3) 2' c, 6' m, 10' c Paquin (2) 7' c, 8' c Benn 8' c Greenshields 14' c Con: Landry (4/6) 3', 8', 9', 10'; Nicholas (1/1) 14'	(Tokyo 2020)

Tokyo Stadium, Tokyo

Ninth place match

31 July 2021
9:30

Canada	24–10	Kenya
Try: Williams 1' c Farella 3' m, 8' m Landry 10' c Con: Landry (2/3) 1', 10'; Nicholas (0/1)	(Tokyo 2020)	Try: Okello 5' m Ochieng 13' m Con: Okulu (0/2)

Tokyo Stadium, Tokyo

== Sailing ==
Canadian sailors qualified one boat in each of the following events through the 2018 Sailing World Championships, the class-associated Worlds, the 2019 Pan American Games, and the continental regattas.

The full Canadian sailing team (five men and women) was officially named on March 18, 2021, with Nikola Girke becoming the first female sailor for her country to compete in five consecutive Games.

Men

Athlete	Event	Race													Total	
Athlete	Event	1	2	3	4	5	6	7	8	9	10	11	12	M*	Net points	Rank
Tom Ramshaw	Finn	13	7	11	~~14~~	10	13	2	9	13	2	—N/a		7	94	10
Oliver Bone; Jacob Saunders	470	12	~~17~~	16	16	7	15	16	12	17	14	—N/a		EL	125	17
Evan DePaul; William Jones	49er	19	19	~~20~~	16	16	12	18	17	12	13	18	19	EL	179	19

Women

Athlete	Event	Race													Total	
Athlete	Event	1	2	3	4	5	6	7	8	9	10	11	12	M*	Net points	Rank
Nikola Girke	RS:X	~~25~~	23	22	24	21	20	23	23	22	25	21	20	EL	244	23
Sarah Douglas	Laser Radial	18	4	4	~~26~~	8	24	13	5	4	2	—N/a		9	100	6
Mariah Millen; Alexandra Ten Hove	49erFX	~~18~~	7	15	16	15	15	10	12	4	13	16	17	EL	138	16

M =Medal race; EL =Eliminated – did not advance into the medal race

== Shooting ==
Canada qualified one shooter through the 2018 Championships of the Americas in Guadalajara, Mexico. The athlete named to the team must have obtained a minimum qualifying score (MQS). The Shooting Federation of Canada named the only athletes qualified to compete on April 30, 2021. Lynda Kiejko will be competing in her second straight Olympics.

Athlete	Event	Qualification		Final	
Athlete	Event	Points	Rank	Points	Rank
Lynda Kiejko	Women's 10 m air pistol	558–9x	47	Did not advance	
Lynda Kiejko	Women's 25 m pistol	564–13x	42	Did not advance	

== Skateboarding ==
Canada qualified a total of four skateboarders (three men and one woman). One skateboarder qualified in the men's park event, based on the Olympic World Skateboarding Rankings. Canada later qualified two men in the street discipline, also based on the Olympic World Skateboarding Rankings. The team was officially named on June 11, 2021. With the debut of Skateboarding on the Olympic program, this also marks Canada's sport debut at the Olympics. On July 24, Annie Guglia received a reallocated spot in the women's street skateboarding event after an injury to a competitor from South Africa.

Athlete	Event	Qualification		Final	
Athlete	Event	Opposition Result	Rank	Opposition Result	Rank
Andy Anderson	Men's park	60.78	16	Did not advance	
Matt Berger	Men's street	4.02	20	Did not advance	
Micky Papa	Men's street	30.39	10	Did not advance	
Annie Guglia	Women's street	3.35	19	Did not advance	

== Softball ==
Canada women's national softball team qualified by placing second at the WSBC American Qualification Event, held in Surrey, British Columbia.

Summary

Team	Event	Round robin						Final / BM	
Team	Event	Opposition Result	Opposition Result	Opposition Result	Opposition Result	Opposition Result	Rank	Opposition Result	Rank
Canada women's	Women's tournament	Mexico; W 4–0	United States; L 0–1	Australia; W 7–1	Japan; L 0–1	Italy; W 8–1	3 QB	Mexico; W 3–2	3rd place, bronze medalist(s)

Team roster

The Canadian roster of 15 athletes was named on 12 May 2021, including four members of the last team that competed at the Olympics (Lawrie, Rafter, Regula and Sailing).

Softball at the 2020 Summer Olympics – Canada roster
Players		Coaches
Pitchers: 15 Danielle Lawrie; 17 Sara Groenewegen; 29 Jenna Caira; 38 Lauren Bay-Regula	Catchers: 2 Natalie Wideman; 55 Kaleigh Rafter; Infielders: 1 Kelsey Harshman; 5 Joey Lye; 7 Jennifer Salling; 14 Janet Leung; 19 Emma Entzminger; Outfielders: 3 Erika Polidori; 8 Victoria Hayward; 25 Jennifer Gilbert; 26 Larissa Franklin	Manager: 0 Mark Smith; Coaches: Lonni Alameda; Mel Basilio; Chris Jones

Group play

Pos	Team	Pld	W	L	RF	RA	RD	PCT	GB	Qualification
1	United States	5	5	0	9	2	+7	1.000	—	Gold medal match
2	Japan (H)	5	4	1	18	5	+13	.800	1	Gold medal match
3	Canada	5	3	2	19	4	+15	.600	2	Bronze medal match
4	Mexico	5	2	3	11	10	+1	.400	3	Bronze medal match
5	Australia	5	1	4	5	21	−16	.200	4	
6	Italy	5	0	5	1	21	−20	.000	5	

Source: Tokyo 2020 and WBSC
(H) Hosts

21 July 15:00 (JST) Fukushima Azuma Baseball Stadium 33 °C (91 °F)
Team	1	2	3	4	5	6	7	R	H	E
Mexico	0	0	0	0	0	0	0	0	2	0
Canada	2	0	1	1	0	0	X	4	9	0
WP: Sara Groenewegen (1–0) LP: Dallas Escobedo (0–1) Sv: Danielle Lawrie (1); Home runs: MEX: None; CAN: Jennifer Salling (1); Boxscore

22 July 09:00 (JST) Fukushima Azuma Baseball Stadium 26 °C (79 °F)
Team	1	2	3	4	5	6	7	R	H	E
United States	0	0	0	0	1	0	0	1	7	1
Canada	0	0	0	0	0	0	0	0	1	1
WP: Monica Abbott (1–0) LP: Jenna Caira (0–1); Boxscore

24 July 10:00 (JST) Yokohama Stadium 29 °C (84 °F)
Team	1	2	3	4	5	6	7	R	H	E
Australia	1	0	0	0	0	0	0	1	6	2
Canada	3	3	0	1	0	0	X	7	8	0
WP: Jenna Caira (1–1) LP: Ellen Roberts (0–1); Boxscore

25 July 14:30 (JST) Yokohama Stadium 33 °C (91 °F)
Team	1	2	3	4	5	6	7	8	R	H	E
Canada	0	0	0	0	0	0	0	0	0	4	1
Japan (8)	0	0	0	0	0	0	0	1	1	6	0
WP: Miu Goto (3–0) LP: Danielle Lawrie (0–1); Boxscore

26 July 14:30 (JST) Yokohama Stadium 31 °C (88 °F)
Team	1	2	3	4	5	6	7	R	H	E
Canada (6)	0	1	1	0	3	3	X	8	7	1
Italy	0	0	1	0	0	0	X	1	4	1
WP: Lauren Bay-Regula (1–0) LP: Greta Cecchetti (0–4); Home runs: CAN: Jennifer Gilbert (1); ITA: None; Boxscore

Bronze medal match

27 July 13:00 (JST) Yokohama Stadium
Team	1	2	3	4	5	6	7	R	H	E
Mexico	0	0	1	0	1	0	0	2	7	1
Canada (bronze)	0	2	0	0	1	0	X	3	6	0
WP: Danielle Lawrie (1–1) LP: Danielle O'Toole (0–2); Boxscore

== Sport climbing ==
Canada qualified two sport climbers. Sean McColl secured one of the quota places available in the men's combined event at the 2019 IFSC World Championships in Hachioji, Japan. Meanwhile, Alannah Yip claimed a spot with her win at the IFSC Pan American Championships in Los Angeles, California. The team was officially named on March 19, 2021.

Athlete	Event	Qualification									Final								
Athlete	Event	Speed		Boulder		Lead			Total	Rank	Speed		Boulder		Lead			Total	Rank
Athlete	Event	Best	Place	Result	Place	Hold	Time	Place	Total	Rank	Best	Place	Result	Place	Hold	Time	Place	Total	Rank
Sean McColl	Men's	6.93	14	0T2z 0 3	15	35+	-	8	1680.00	17	Did not advance								
Alannah Yip	Women's	7.99	6	0T2z 0 2	16	21+	2:14	12	1152.00	14	Did not advance								

== Swimming ==
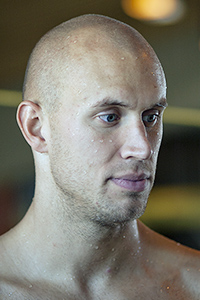
Brent Hayden competed in two events.

The Canadian swim team consisted of 26 swimmers (10 men and 16 women). Canadian swimmers achieved qualifying standards in the following events (up to a maximum of 2 swimmers in each event at the Olympic Qualifying Time (OQT), and potentially 1 at the Olympic Selection Time (OST)): To secure their nomination to the Olympic team, swimmers must have finished in the top two of each individual pool event under the FINA Olympic qualifying A standard at the Canadian Olympic Trials (19 to 23 June 2021) in Toronto, Ontario. Swimmers not meeting the standard were named as relay only swimmers.

At the 2020 Olympic Marathon Swim Qualifier in Setúbal, Portugal, Kate Sanderson qualified for the games with a third place finish. The next day, Hau-Li Fan qualified as the highest finisher from the Americas not yet qualified.

On January 22, 2021, Swimming Canada nominated six swimmers to the Olympic team, including Penny Oleksiak (women's 200 m freestyle); and world champions Kylie Masse (women's 100 m backstroke) and Maggie MacNeil (women's 100 m butterfly). These swimmers were named based on their performances at the 2019 World Aquatics Championships in Gwangju, South Korea. The rest of the team was named on June 24, 2021.

Key

- Note–Ranks given for swimming events are the round's ranking
- Q =Qualified for the next round
- AM =Area record
- NR =National record
- OR =Olympic record
- N/A =Round not applicable for the event

Men

Athlete	Event	Heat		Semifinal		Final	
Athlete	Event	Time	Rank	Time	Rank	Time	Rank
Brent Hayden	50 m freestyle	21.85	8 Q	21.82	=9	Did not advance	
Joshua Liendo	50 m freestyle	22.03	18	Did not advance			
Yuri Kisil	100 m freestyle	48.15	10 Q	48.31	15	Did not advance	
Joshua Liendo	100 m freestyle	48.34	14 Q	48.19	14	Did not advance	
Cole Pratt	100 m backstroke	54.27	26	Did not advance			
Markus Thormeyer	100 m backstroke	53.80	19	Did not advance			
Markus Thormeyer	200 m backstroke	1:57.85	16 Q	1:59.36	16	Did not advance	
Gabe Mastromatteo	100 m breaststroke	1:01.56	38	Did not advance			
Joshua Liendo	100 m butterfly	51.52	9 Q	51.50	11	Did not advance	
Finlay Knox	200 m individual medley	1:58.29	17	Did not advance			
Ruslan Gaziev^{[a]} Brent Hayden; Yuri Kisil; Joshua Liendo; Markus Thormeyer	4 × 100 m freestyle relay	3:13.00	7 Q	—N/a		3:10.82 NR	4
Yuri Kisil; Joshua Liendo; Gabe Mastromatteo; Markus Thormeyer	4 × 100 m medley relay	3:32.37	8 Q	—N/a		3:32.42	7
Hau-Li Fan	10 km open water	—N/a				1:51:37.0	9

Women

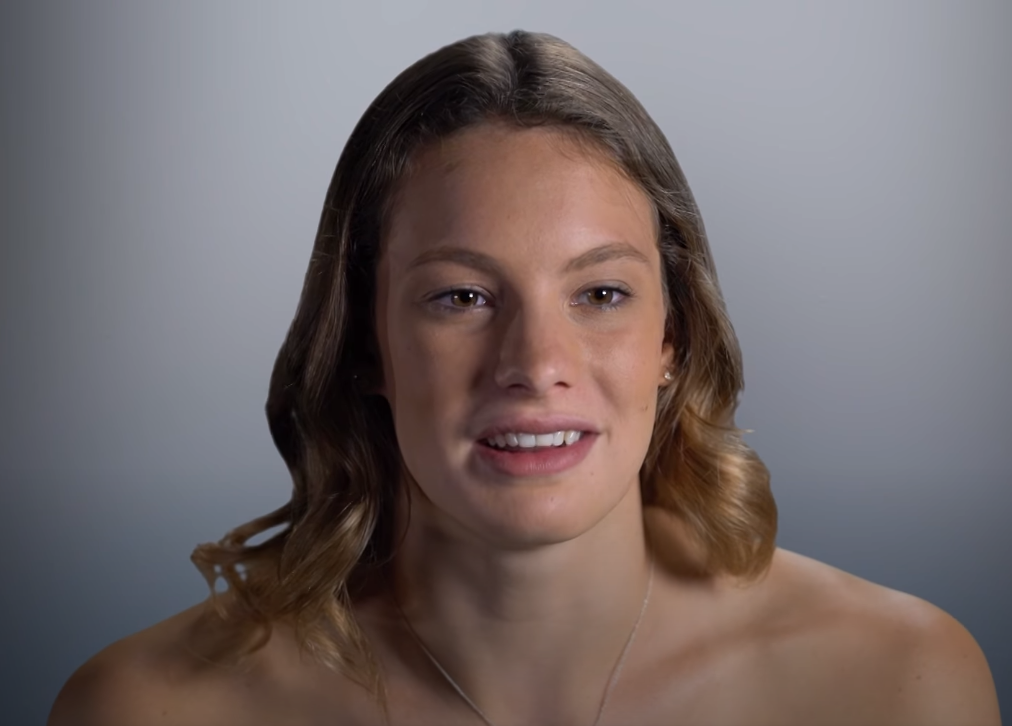
Penny Oleksiak won three medals, becoming the most decorated Canadian Olympian ever, with a total of seven medals.

Athlete	Event	Heat		Semifinal		Final	
Athlete	Event	Time	Rank	Time	Rank	Time	Rank
Kayla Sanchez	50 m freestyle	24.93	22	Did not advance			
Penny Oleksiak	100 m freestyle	52.95	6 Q	52.86	5 Q	52.59 NR	4
Kayla Sanchez	100 m freestyle	53.12	10 Q	Withdrew		Did not advance	
Summer McIntosh	200 m freestyle	1:56.11	5 Q	1:56.82	9	Did not advance	
Penny Oleksiak	200 m freestyle	1:55.38	2 Q	1:56.39	6 Q	1:54.70	3rd place, bronze medalist(s)
Summer McIntosh	400 m freestyle	4:02.72 NR	5 Q	—N/a		4:02.42 NR	4
Summer McIntosh	800 m freestyle	8:25.04	11	—N/a		Did not advance	
Katrina Bellio	1500 m freestyle	16:24.37	21	—N/a		Did not advance	
Kylie Masse	100 m backstroke	58.17 OR	3 Q	58.09	2 Q	57.72	2nd place, silver medalist(s)
Taylor Ruck	100 m backstroke	59.89	11 Q	59.45	9	Did not advance	
Kylie Masse	200 m backstroke	2:08.23	=2 Q	2:07.82	4 Q	2:05.42 NR	2nd place, silver medalist(s)
Taylor Ruck	200 m backstroke	2:08.87	6 Q	2:08.73	7 Q	2:08.24	6
Kierra Smith	100 m breaststroke	1:07.87	24	Did not advance			
Kelsey Wog	100 m breaststroke	1:07.73	23	Did not advance			
Sydney Pickrem	200 m breaststroke	DNS		Did not advance			
Kelsey Wog	200 m breaststroke	2:24.27	16 Q	DSQ		Did not advance	
Maggie MacNeil	100 m butterfly	56.55	5 Q	56.56	6 Q	55.59 AM	1st place, gold medalist(s)
Katerine Savard	100 m butterfly	57.51	11 Q	58.10	16	Did not advance	
Bailey Andison	200 m individual medley	2:12.52	18	Did not advance			
Sydney Pickrem	200 m individual medley	2:10.13	6 Q	2:09.94	6 Q	2:10.05	6
Tessa Cieplucha	400 m individual medley	4:44.54	14	—N/a		Did not advance	
Sydney Pickrem	400 m individual medley	DNS		—N/a		Did not advance	
Maggie MacNeil; Penny Oleksiak; Kayla Sanchez; Rebecca Smith; Taylor Ruck^{[a]}	4 × 100 m freestyle relay	3:33.72	3	—N/a		3:32.78	2nd place, silver medalist(s)
Summer McIntosh; Penny Oleksiak; Kayla Sanchez; Rebecca Smith; Mary-Sophie Harvey^{[a]} Sydney Pickrem^{[a]} Katerine Savard^{[a]}	4 × 200 m freestyle relay	7:51.52	4 Q	—N/a		7:43.77 NR	4
Maggie Mac Neil; Kylie Masse; Penny Oleksiak; Sydney Pickrem; Taylor Ruck^{[a]} Kayla Sanchez^{[a]}	4 × 100 m medley relay	3:55.17	1 Q	—N/a		3:52.60 NR	3rd place, bronze medalist(s)
Kate Sanderson	10 km open water	—N/a				2:04:59.1	18

Mixed

Athlete	Event	Heat		Final	
Athlete	Event	Time	Rank	Time	Rank
Javier Acevedo; Gabe Mastromatteo; Katerine Savard; Rebecca Smith	4 × 100 m medley relay	3:46.54	13	Did not advance	

^{a} Swimmers who participated in the heats only.

== Table tennis ==
Canada qualified three athletes into the table tennis competition. Eugene Wang secured a men's spot for his third Olympics, with Zhang Mo going to her fourth in the women's side, by winning the singles competition at the 2020 ITTF North American Olympic Qualification Tournament in Kitchener, Ontario, Canada. The duo also won the inaugural mixed doubles competition to qualify for that event. Wang later gave up his singles spot in favour of Jeremy Hazin to focus on the mixed doubles.

Athlete	Event	Preliminary	Round 1	Round 2	Round 3	Round of 16	Quarterfinals	Semifinals	Final / BM	Rank
Athlete	Event	Opposition Result	Opposition Result	Opposition Result	Opposition Result	Opposition Result	Opposition Result	Opposition Result	Opposition Result	Rank
Jeremy Hazin	Men's singles	Bye	Tokič (SLO); L 0–4	Did not advance						49
Zhang Mo	Women's singles	Bye		Noskova (ROC); W 4–3	Solja (GER); W 4–3	Chen M (CHN); L 1–4	Did not advance			9
Eugene Wang; Zhang Mo	Mixed doubles	—N/a				Xu X / Liu Sw (CHN); L 1–4	Did not advance			9

== Taekwondo ==
Canada qualified two taekwondo practitioners. Skylar Park qualified directly for the women's lightweight category (57 kg) by finishing among the top five in the World Taekwondo Olympic Rankings at the end of the qualification period. In late June 2021, Yvette Yong was allocated an unused quota spot from the 2020 Oceania Qualification Tournament, bringing the team to two athletes. The team was officially named on July 2, 2021.

Athlete	Event	Qualification	Round of 16	Quarterfinals	Semifinals	Repechage	Final / BM	Rank
Athlete	Event	Opposition Result	Opposition Result	Opposition Result	Opposition Result	Opposition Result	Opposition Result	Rank
Yvette Yong	Women's 49 kg	Bye	Trương (VIE); L 5–19	Did not advance				11
Skylar Park	Women's 57 kg	Bye	Hymer (AUS); W 25–15	Lo C-l (TPE); L 6–18	Did not advance			9

== Tennis ==
Canada qualified five tennis players (two men and three women). Milos Raonic and Denis Shapovalov were also listed in the rankings but declined the opportunity to attend the Games. The team was officially named on June 29, 2021. On July 12, 2021, Bianca Andreescu withdrew from the tournament citing the effects of the COVID-19 pandemic, which meant the team was reduced to five athletes. The team was further reduced to four athletes when Vasek Pospisil withdrew.

Athlete	Event	Round of 64	Round of 32	Round of 16	Quarterfinals	Semifinals	Final / BM	Rank
Athlete	Event	Opposition Score	Opposition Score	Opposition Score	Opposition Score	Opposition Score	Opposition Score	Rank
Félix Auger-Aliassime	Men's singles	Purcell (AUS); L 4–6, 6–7^{(2–7)}	Did not advance					33
Leylah Annie Fernandez	Women's singles	Yastremska (UKR); W 6–3, 3–6, 6–0	Krejčíková (CZE); L 2–6, 4–6	Did not advance				17
Gabriela Dabrowski; Sharon Fichman	Women's doubles	—N/a	Pigossi / Stefani (BRA); L 6–7^{(3–7)}, 4–6	Did not advance				17
Gabriela Dabrowski; Félix Auger-Aliassime	Mixed doubles	—N/a		Sakkari / Tsitsipas (GRE); L 3–6, 4–6	Did not advance			9

== Triathlon ==
Canada qualified four triathletes (two per gender) based on the ITU Olympic Rankings as of June 14, 2021. The team was officially named on July 7, 2021. Alexis Lepage was added to the team to replace Tyler Mislawchuk in the mixed relay, after Mislawchuk was injured in the individual race.

Individual

Athlete	Event	Swim (1.5 km)	Trans 1	Bike (40 km)	Trans 2	Run (10 km)	Total	Rank
Tyler Mislawchuk	Men's	17:50	0:39	56:35	0:29	30:55	1:46:28	15
Matthew Sharpe	Men's	18:35	0:39	56:31	0:34	41:50	1:57:32	49
Joanna Brown	Women's	19:15	0:42	Lapped				
Amélie Kretz	Women's	19:39	0:44	1:04:56	0:33	34:41	2:00:33	15

Mixed relay

Athlete	Event	Swim (250 m)	Trans 1	Bike (7 km)	Trans 2	Run (1.5 km)	Total Group Time	Rank
Alexis Lepage	Mixed relay	3:57	0:36	10:11	0:30	6:17	21:31	—N/a
Matthew Sharpe	Mixed relay	4:07	0:37	9:28	0:32	6:06	20:50	—N/a
Joanna Brown	Mixed relay	4:03	0:44	10:21	0:32	6:40	22:20	—N/a
Amélie Kretz	Mixed relay	4:33	0:40	10:36	0:31	6:20	22:40	—N/a
Total	Mixed relay	—N/a					1:27:21	14

== Volleyball ==
Canada qualified a total of 16 athletes in volleyball. 12 of the 16 made up the men's volleyball team, while the other four consisted of two pairs in the women's beach volleyball tournament.

=== Beach ===
Melissa Humana-Paredes and Sarah Pavan qualified by winning the gold medal at the 2019 FIVB World Championships in Hamburg, Germany. Heather Bansley and Brandie Wilkerson later qualified by being ranked in the top 15 of the FIVB Beach volleyball Olympic Ranking. The team was officially named on July 5, 2021.

Athletes	Event	Preliminary round				Round of 16	Quarterfinals	Semifinals	Finals	Rank
Athletes	Event	Opposition Score	Opposition Score	Opposition Score	Rank	Opposition Score	Opposition Score	Opposition Score	Opposition Score	Rank
Heather Bansley; Brandie Wilkerson	Women's	Wang / Xia (CHN); L (21–18, 15–21, 11–15)	Gallay / Pereyra (ARG); W (22–20, 21–12)	Ágatha / Duda (BRA); L (18–21, 18–21)	3 Q	Claes / Sponcil (USA); W (22–24, 21–18, 15–13)	Graudiņa / Kravčenoka (LAT); L (13–21, 21–18, 11–15)	Did not advance		5
Melissa Humana-Paredes; Sarah Pavan	Women's	Schoon / Stam (NED); W (21–16, 21–14)	Borger / Sude (GER); W (21–17, 21–14)	Heidrich / Vergé-Dépré (SUI); W (21–13, 24–22)	1 Q	Fernández / Baquerizo (ESP); W (21–13, 21–13)	Solar / Clancy (AUS); L (15–21, 21–19, 12–15)	Did not advance		5

=== Indoor ===
Summary

Team	Event	Group stage						Quarterfinal	Semifinal	Final / BM	
Team	Event	Opposition Score	Opposition Score	Opposition Score	Opposition Score	Opposition Score	Rank	Opposition Score	Opposition Score	Opposition Score	Rank
Canada men's	Men's tournament	Italy; L 2–3	Japan; L 1–3	Iran; W 3–0	Venezuela; W 3–0	Poland; L 0–3	4 Q	ROC; L 0–3	Did not advance		8

==== Men's tournament ====
Canada men's volleyball team qualified by winning the North American Olympic Qualification Tournament in Vancouver.

Team roster

The Canada roster was announced on 30 June 2021.

Head coach: (Canada) Glenn Hoag

- 1 TJ Sanders S
- 2 Gord Perrin (c) OH
- 3 Steven Marshall OH
- 4 Nicholas Hoag OH
- 7 Stephen Maar OH
- 9 Jay Blankenau S
- 10 Ryan Sclater OP
- 12 Lucas Van Berkel MB
- 13 Sharone Vernon-Evans OP
- 17 Graham Vigrass MB
- 19 Blair Bann L
- 20 Arthur Szwarc MB

Group A

Pos	Team	Pld	W	L	Pts	SW	SL	SR	SPW	SPL	SPR	Qualification
1	Poland	5	4	1	13	14	4	3.500	435	365	1.192	Quarterfinals
2	Italy	5	4	1	11	12	7	1.714	447	411	1.088	Quarterfinals
3	Japan (H)	5	3	2	8	10	9	1.111	437	433	1.009	Quarterfinals
4	Canada	5	2	3	7	9	9	1.000	396	387	1.023	Quarterfinals
5	Iran	5	2	3	6	9	11	0.818	453	460	0.985	
6	Venezuela	5	0	5	0	1	15	0.067	281	393	0.715	

Source: Tokyo 2020 and FIVB
Rules for classification: Tiebreakers
(H) Host

24 July 2021; 09:00 v	Italy	3–2	Canada	Ariake Arena, Tokyo; Referees: Evgeny Makshanov (RUS), Liu Jiang (CHN)
24 July 2021; 09:00 v	(26–28, 18–25, 25–21, 25–18, 15–11); Results Statistics			Ariake Arena, Tokyo; Referees: Evgeny Makshanov (RUS), Liu Jiang (CHN)

26 July 2021; 19:40 v	Japan	3–1	Canada	Ariake Arena, Tokyo; Referees: Daniele Rapisarda (ITA), Patricia Rolf (USA)
26 July 2021; 19:40 v	(23–25, 25–23, 25–23, 25–20); Results Statistics			Ariake Arena, Tokyo; Referees: Daniele Rapisarda (ITA), Patricia Rolf (USA)

28 July 2021; 09:00 v	Canada	3–0	Iran	Ariake Arena, Tokyo; Referees: Luis Macias (MEX), Paulo Turci (BRA)
28 July 2021; 09:00 v	(25–16, 25–20, 25–22); Results Statistics			Ariake Arena, Tokyo; Referees: Luis Macias (MEX), Paulo Turci (BRA)

30 July 2021; 09:00 v	Canada	3–0	Venezuela	Ariake Arena, Tokyo; Referees: Patricia Rolf (USA), Susana Rodríguez (ESP)
30 July 2021; 09:00 v	(25–13, 25–22, 25–12); Results Statistics			Ariake Arena, Tokyo; Referees: Patricia Rolf (USA), Susana Rodríguez (ESP)

1 August 2021; 09:00 v	Poland	3–0	Canada	Ariake Arena, Tokyo; Referees: Paulo Turci (BRA), Hamid Al-Rousi (UAE)
1 August 2021; 09:00 v	(25–15, 25–21, 25–16); Results Statistics			Ariake Arena, Tokyo; Referees: Paulo Turci (BRA), Hamid Al-Rousi (UAE)

Quarterfinal

3 August 2021; 09:00 v	Canada	0–3	ROC	Ariake Arena, Tokyo; Referees: Hernán Casamiquela (ARG), Shin Muranaka (JPN)
3 August 2021; 09:00 v	(21–25, 28–30, 22–25); Results Statistics			Ariake Arena, Tokyo; Referees: Hernán Casamiquela (ARG), Shin Muranaka (JPN)

== Water polo ==
Summary

Key:
- FT – After full time.
- P – Match decided by penalty-shootout.

Team	Event	Group stage					Quarterfinal	Classification	Seventh place match	
Team	Event	Opposition Score	Opposition Score	Opposition Score	Opposition Score	Rank	Opposition Score	Opposition Score	Opposition Score	Rank
Canada women's	Women's tournament	Australia; L 5–8	Spain; L 10–14	South Africa; W 21–1	Netherlands; L 12–16	4 Q	United States; L 5–16	Australia; L 12–14	China; W 16–7	7

=== Women's tournament ===
Canada women's national water polo team qualified for the Olympics by winning the silver medal, and securing a berth as the highest ranked non-qualified team, at the 2019 Pan American Games in Lima, Peru, signifying the country's return to the competition for the first time since Athens 2004.

Team roster

Canada's final squad was announced on 28 June 2021.

Head coach: David Paradelo

No.	Player	Pos.	L/R	Height	Weight	Date of birth (age)	Apps	OG/ Goals	Club
1	Clara Vulpisi	GK	R	1.72 m (5 ft 8 in)	80 kg (176 lb)	15 July 1998 (aged 23)	53	0/0	(Canada) Montreal Ouest
2	Kelly McKee	CB	R	1.72 m (5 ft 8 in)	75 kg (165 lb)	16 June 1992 (aged 29)	320	0/0	(Canada) Calgary Renegades
3	Axelle Crevier	D	R	1.72 m (5 ft 8 in)	66 kg (146 lb)	22 March 1997 (aged 24)	120	0/0	(Canada) Montreal Ouest
4	Emma Wright	CF	L	1.80 m (5 ft 11 in)	82 kg (181 lb)	16 November 1996 (aged 24)	209	0/0	(Canada) Shadow (Scarborough)
5	Monika Eggens (C)	D	R	1.88 m (6 ft 2 in)	77 kg (170 lb)	25 December 1990 (aged 30)	499	0/0	(Canada) Pacific Storm (Vancouver)
6	Gurpreet Sohi	D	R	1.70 m (5 ft 7 in)	60 kg (132 lb)	20 July 1994 (aged 27)	90	0/0	(Canada) Fraser Valley
7	Joelle Bekhazi	D	R	1.70 m (5 ft 7 in)	65 kg (143 lb)	27 April 1987 (aged 34)	574	0/0	(Canada) Dollard
8	Elyse Lemay-Lavoie	CF	R	1.74 m (5 ft 9 in)	85 kg (187 lb)	12 November 1994 (aged 26)	100	0/0	(Canada) Montreal Ouest
9	Hayley McKelvey	CB	R	1.80 m (5 ft 11 in)	72 kg (159 lb)	11 March 1996 (aged 25)	130	0/0	(Canada) Pacific Storm (Vancouver)
10	Kyra Christmas	D	L	1.82 m (6 ft 0 in)	73 kg (161 lb)	14 March 1997 (aged 24)	99	0/0	(Canada) Calgary Renegades
11	Kindred Paul	CB	R	1.80 m (5 ft 11 in)	72 kg (159 lb)	22 February 1996 (aged 25)	97	0/0	(Canada) Edmonton
12	Shae La Roche	D	R	1.65 m (5 ft 5 in)	68 kg (150 lb)	3 September 1992 (aged 28)	240	0/0	(Canada) Laval
13	Claire Wright	GK	R	1.78 m (5 ft 10 in)	80 kg (176 lb)	2 February 1994 (aged 27)	140	0/0	(Canada) Shadow (Scarborough)
Average				1.76 m (5 ft 9 in)	73 kg (161 lb)	27 years, 4 days	205		

Note: Age as of 23 July 2021
Source: Canada Women | Tokyo 2020 Olympics Archived 2021-07-22 at the Wayback Machine

Group A

Pos	Team	Pld	W	D	L	GF	GA	GD	Pts	Qualification
1	Spain	4	3	0	1	71	37	+34	6 (Note: Spain 2 Pts, +5 GD; Netherlands 2 Pts, −2 GD; Australia 2 Pts, −3 GD. Spain first and after that the head-to head results between Australia and Netherlands (15–12) came into effect.)	Quarterfinals
2	Australia	4	3	0	1	46	33	+13	6	Quarterfinals
3	Netherlands	4	3	0	1	75	41	+34	6	Quarterfinals
4	Canada	4	1	0	3	48	39	+9	2	Quarterfinals
5	South Africa	4	0	0	4	7	97	−90	0	

Source: Tokyo 2020 and FINA
Rules for classification: 1) Points; 2) Head-to-head points; 3) Head-to-head goal difference; 4) Head-to-head goals scored; 5) Goal difference.
Notes:

24 July 2021; 15:30 v	Report	Canada	5–8	Australia	Tokyo Tatsumi International Swimming Center; Referees: Michael Goldenberg (USA), György Kun (HUN)
24 July 2021; 15:30 v	Report	Score by quarters: 1–1, 2–4, 1–2, 1–1			Tokyo Tatsumi International Swimming Center; Referees: Michael Goldenberg (USA), György Kun (HUN)
24 July 2021; 15:30 v	Report	Eggens 3	Goals	Halligan 3	Tokyo Tatsumi International Swimming Center; Referees: Michael Goldenberg (USA), György Kun (HUN)

26 July 2021; 19:50 v	Report	Spain	14–10	Canada	Tokyo Tatsumi International Swimming Center; Referees: Georgios Stavridis (GRE), Nenad Periš (CRO)
26 July 2021; 19:50 v	Report	Score by quarters: 4–2, 2–2, 3–2, 5–3			Tokyo Tatsumi International Swimming Center; Referees: Georgios Stavridis (GRE), Nenad Periš (CRO)
26 July 2021; 19:50 v	Report	Ortiz 4	Goals	Lemay-Lavoie 3	Tokyo Tatsumi International Swimming Center; Referees: Georgios Stavridis (GRE), Nenad Periš (CRO)

28 July 2021; 15:30 v	Report	Canada	21–1	South Africa	Tokyo Tatsumi International Swimming Center; Referees: Asumi Tsuzaki (JPN), John Waldow (NZL)
28 July 2021; 15:30 v	Report	Score by quarters: 5–1, 4–0, 4–0, 8–0			Tokyo Tatsumi International Swimming Center; Referees: Asumi Tsuzaki (JPN), John Waldow (NZL)
28 July 2021; 15:30 v	Report	Sohi 4	Goals	Moir 1	Tokyo Tatsumi International Swimming Center; Referees: Asumi Tsuzaki (JPN), John Waldow (NZL)

1 August 2021; 15:30 v	Report	Netherlands	16–12	Canada	Tokyo Tatsumi International Swimming Center; Referees: Alessandro Severo (ITA), Nenad Periš (CRO)
1 August 2021; 15:30 v	Report	Score by quarters: 4–4, 4–3, 3–2, 5–3			Tokyo Tatsumi International Swimming Center; Referees: Alessandro Severo (ITA), Nenad Periš (CRO)
1 August 2021; 15:30 v	Report	Van de Kraats 6	Goals	Christmas 4	Tokyo Tatsumi International Swimming Center; Referees: Alessandro Severo (ITA), Nenad Periš (CRO)

Quarterfinal

3 August 2021; 14:00 v	Report	Canada	5–16	United States	Tokyo Tatsumi International Swimming Center; Referees: Asumi Tsuzaki (JPN), Georgios Stavridis (GRE)
3 August 2021; 14:00 v	Report	Score by quarters: 1–7, 2–4, 0–0, 2–5			Tokyo Tatsumi International Swimming Center; Referees: Asumi Tsuzaki (JPN), Georgios Stavridis (GRE)
3 August 2021; 14:00 v	Report	La Roche 2	Goals	three players 3	Tokyo Tatsumi International Swimming Center; Referees: Asumi Tsuzaki (JPN), Georgios Stavridis (GRE)

5–8th place semifinal

5 August 2021; 18:20 v	Report	Australia	14–12 (PSO)	Canada	Tokyo Tatsumi International Swimming Center; Referees: Ursula Wengenroth (SUI), Alessandro Severo (ITA)
5 August 2021; 18:20 v	Report	Score by quarters: 2–3, 3–2, 3–3, 2–2 PSO: 4–2			Tokyo Tatsumi International Swimming Center; Referees: Ursula Wengenroth (SUI), Alessandro Severo (ITA)
5 August 2021; 18:20 v	Report	Arancini 5	Goals	four players 2	Tokyo Tatsumi International Swimming Center; Referees: Ursula Wengenroth (SUI), Alessandro Severo (ITA)

Seventh place game

7 August 2021; 09:30 v	Report	China	7–16	Canada	Tokyo Tatsumi International Swimming Center; Referees: Nicola Johnson (AUS), Asumi Tsuzaki (JPN)
7 August 2021; 09:30 v	Report	Score by quarters: 3–4, 2–5, 1–4, 1–3			Tokyo Tatsumi International Swimming Center; Referees: Nicola Johnson (AUS), Asumi Tsuzaki (JPN)
7 August 2021; 09:30 v	Report	Zhang J. 4	Goals	Christmas 4	Tokyo Tatsumi International Swimming Center; Referees: Nicola Johnson (AUS), Asumi Tsuzaki (JPN)

== Weightlifting ==
Canada qualified five weightlifters, one man and four women. Both Boady Santavy (96 kg) and Maude Charron (64 kg) qualified by being ranked in the top eight of their respective weight categories in the IWF absolute rankings. The remaining three weightlifters topped the field among those vying for qualification from the Pan American region. The team was officially named on June 18, 2021.

Athlete	Event	Snatch		Clean & jerk		Total	Rank
Athlete	Event	Result	Rank	Result	Rank	Total	Rank
Boady Santavy	Men's 96 kg	178	1	208	5	386	4
Rachel Leblanc-Bazinet	Women's 55 kg	82	11	99	12	181	12
Tali Darsigny	Women's 59 kg	90	9	109	9	199	9
Maude Charron	Women's 64 kg	105	1	131	1	236	1st place, gold medalist(s)
Kristel Ngarlem	Women's 76 kg	95	10	123	9	218	8

== Wrestling ==
Canada qualified four wrestlers for each of the following weight classes; all of whom advanced to the finals to book spots in the men's freestyle (97 and 125 kg) and women's freestyle (68 and 76 kg), respectively, at the 2020 Pan American Qualification Tournament in Ottawa. These will be the first Olympics where Canada has failed to qualify entries in all women's freestyle weight categories. The team was officially confirmed on May 19, 2021.

Key:

- VT – Victory by fall.
- VB – Victory by injury (VF for forfeit, VA for withdrawal or disqualification)
- PP – Decision by points – the loser with technical points.
- PO – Decision by points – the loser without technical points.
- ST – Great superiority – the loser without technical points and a margin of victory of at least 8 (Greco-Roman) or 10 (freestyle) points.
- SP – Technical superiority – the loser with technical points and a margin of victory of at least 8 (Greco-Roman) or 10 (freestyle) points.

Freestyle

Athlete	Event	Round of 16	Quarterfinal	Semifinal	Repechage	Final / BM	Rank
Athlete	Event	Opposition Result	Opposition Result	Opposition Result	Opposition Result	Opposition Result	Rank
Jordan Steen	Men's 97 kg	Snyder (USA); L 2–12 ^{SP}	Did not advance		Conyedo (ITA); L 2–4 ^{PP}	Did not advance	10
Amar Dhesi	Men's 125 kg	Akgül (TUR); L 0–5 ^{PO}	Did not advance				14
Danielle Lappage	Women's 68 kg	Velieva (ROC); L 0–7 ^{PO}	Did not advance				15
Erica Wiebe	Women's 76 kg	Mäe (EST); L 4–5 ^{PP}	Did not advance				12

== See also ==
- Canada at the 2018 Commonwealth Games
- Canada at the 2019 Pan American Games
- Canada at the 2020 Winter Youth Olympics
- Canada at the 2020 Summer Paralympics
