= Annie Guglia =

Canadian skateboarder, b. 1990

Personal information
- Born: 15 November 1990 (age 36) Montreal, Canada

Sport
- Country: Canada
- Sport: Skateboarding

Annie Guglia (born 15 November 1990) is a Canadian skateboarder and LGBTQ rights activist. She identified herself as a lesbian. She is also regarded as a prominent LGBTQ activist. She made her debut appearance in the Olympics at the age of 30 representing Canada at the 2020 Summer Olympics where skateboarding was also added in Olympics for the very first time. During the 2020 Summer Olympics, she competed in women's street event. She made it to the 2020 Summer Olympics in an unconventional manner despite failing to qualify for the Olympics. She was initially not picked in the Canadian contingent for the 2020 Summer Olympics but was later added as a substitute for an injured athlete in skateboarding event.

== Early life ==
Annie Guglia was born and raised in Montreal. She began competing in skateboarding in 2001 at the age of 11 and briefly participated in skateboarding competitions in the 2005–06 season, at a time when skateboarding was not regarded as a prominent sport and when women confronted difficulties in establishing professional skateboarding careers. She considered quitting the sport at the age of 17 after realising that female skateboarders did not get the same attention and international opportunities as their male counterparts. She then focused on her higher education and pursued masters degree in business strategy.

== Career ==
Guglia returned to the sport in 2017 when it was scheduled for the Olympics for the first time at Tokyo 2020. She placed fifteenth in the 2017 X-Games Minneapolis and won three successive Canada National Championships (2018–2020), She also emerged as a winner of the 2018 and 2019 Jackalope Women Pro skaters division, an annual sports action festival in Canada.

She took part in the 2019 World Skateboarding Championships which was one of the qualifying events for the 2020 Summer Olympics. However, she was eliminated from the semifinals and couldn't directly qualify for Tokyo. She was later picked as an alternative for an injured South African skateboarder and competed in the women's street event at the 2020 Olympics. She was the only Canadian female skateboarder to compete in the women's street event at the Tokyo Olympics.
