= Gurpreet Sohi =

Canadian water polo player (born 1994)

Personal information
- Born: July 20, 1994 (age 32) White Rock, British Columbia, Canada
- Height: 1.70 m (5 ft 7 in)
- Weight: 60 kg (132 lb)

Sport
- Country: Canada
- Sport: Water polo
- Club: Fraser Valley Water Polo club

Gurpreet Sohi (born July 20, 1994) is a Canadian water polo player from Delta, British Columbia. She is a member of the Canada women's national water polo team. She participated in the 2020 Summer Olympics.

== Career ==
She participated at the 2017 FINA Women's Water Polo World League, 2018 FINA Women's Water Polo World League, 2019 FINA Women's Water Polo World League, and 2018 FINA Women's Water Polo World Cup.

She played for Stanford University.

In June 2021, Sohi was named to Canada's 2020 Summer Olympics team.
