= List of Canadian records in track cycling =

The following are the national records in track cycling in Canada maintained by Canada's national cycling federation: Cycling Canada Cyclisme.

== Men ==
Key to tables: Awaiting ratification Record not kept by Cycling Canada Cyclisme Not ratified or later rescinded by the Cycling Canada Cyclisme

Event	Record	Athlete	Date	Meet	Place	Ref
Flying 200 m time trial	9.421	Nick Wammes	16 March 2025	Nations Cup	Konya, Turkey	
250 m time trial (standing start)	17.669	Ryan Dodyk	14 March 2025	Nations Cup	Konya, Turkey	
1 km time trial	58.951	Vincent De Haître	8 September 2019	Pan American Championships	Cochabamba, Bolivia	
1 km time trial (sea level)	59.789	James Hedgcock	18 June 2023	Pan American Championships	San Juan, Argentina	
Team sprint	42.589	Ryan Dodyk; James Hedgcock; Tyler Rorke	14 March 2025	Nations Cup	Konya, Turkey	
4000m individual pursuit	4:05.634	Carson Mattern	16 October 2026	World Championships	Shanghai, China	
4000m team pursuit	3:46.324	Vincent De Haître; Michael Foley; Derek Gee; Jay Lamoureux	4 August 2021	Olympic Games	Izu, Japan	
Hour record	52.3 km	Chris Ernst	18 January 2025		Milton, Canada	

== Women ==
Event	Record	Athlete	Date	Meet	Place	Ref
Flying 200m time trial	10.154	Kelsey Mitchell	5 September 2019	Pan American Championships	Cochabamba, Bolivia	
250 m time trial (standing start)	18.920	Kelsey Mitchell	4 September 2019	Pan American Championships	Cochabamba, Bolivia	
500m time trial	33.260	Lauriane Genest	7 September 2019	Pan American Championships	Cochabamba, Bolivia	
500m time trial (sea level)	33.268	Kelsey Mitchell	15 October 2022	World Championships	Saint-Quentin-en-Yvelines, France	
1 km time trial	1:08.095	Sarah Orban	5 April 2025	Pan American Championships	Asunción, Paraguay	
Team sprint (500 m)	32.232	Kelsey Mitchell; Lauriane Genest	4 September 2019	Pan American Championships	Cochabamba, Bolivia	
Team sprint (750 m)	46.816	Lauriane Genest; Sarah Orban; Kelsey Mitchell	5 August 2024	Olympic Games	Saint-Quentin-en-Yvelines, France	
3000m individual pursuit	3:20.257	Georgia Simmerling	7 September 2019	Pan American Championships	Cochabamba, Bolivia	
4000m individual pursuit	4:41.147	Ariane Bonhomme	5 April 2025	Pan American Championships	Asunción, Paraguay	
3000m team pursuit	3:17.454	Tara Whitten; Gillian Carleton; Jasmin Glaesser	4 August 2012	Olympic Games	London, Great Britain	
4000m team pursuit	4:09.249	Allison Beveridge; Ariane Bonhomme; Annie Foreman-Mackey; Georgia Simmerling	3 August 2021	Olympic Games	Izu, Japan	
Hour record	42.547 km	Angella Goran	25 August 2022		Aguascalientes, Mexico	
Hour record (sea level)	42.425 km	Jane Emans	23 September 2017		Milton, Canada	
