= Natalie Davison =

Natalie Davison may refer to:

- Natalie Davison (canoeist)
- Natalie Davison (Home and Away)
