= Riley Melanson =

Canadian kayaker

Personal information
- Full name: Riley Marie Melanson
- Born: May 19, 1999 (age 27) Halifax, Nova Scotia, Canada
- Height: 177 cm (5 ft 10 in)
- Weight: 165 lb (75 kg)

Sport
- Sport: Canoeing
- Club: Senobe Aquatic Club
Medal record
Women's Canoeing
Representing Canada
Pan American Games
Silver medal – second place	2023 Santiago	K-4 500 metres

Riley Marie Melanson (born May 19, 1999) is a Canadian kayaker.

== Career ==
In September 2023, was named to Canada's 2023 Pan American Games team. At the 2023 Pan American Games, Melanson won silver as part of the Women's K-4 500 metres event. In June 2024, Melanson was named to Canada's Olympic team.
