= Courtney Stott =

Canadian kayaker

Personal information
- Full name: Courtney Laura Stott
- Born: May 11, 1992 (age 34) Ajax, Ontario, Canada
- Home town: Pickering, Ontario, Canada
- Height: 176 cm (5 ft 9 in)

Sport
- Sport: Canoeing
Medal record
Women's Canoeing
Representing Canada
Pan American Games
Silver medal – second place	2023 Santiago	K-4 500 m
Bronze medal – third place	2023 Santiago	K-2 500 m

Courtney Laura Stott (born May 11, 1992) is a Canadian kayaker.

== Career ==
Stott has been competing for Canada since 2015. In September 2023, was named to Canada's 2023 Pan American Games team. At the 2023 Pan American Games, Stott won silver as part of the Women's K-4 500 metres event. In June 2024, Stott was named to Canada's Olympic team.
