= Canada at the 2024 Summer Olympics =

- Flag of Canada
- IOC code: CAN
- NOC: Canadian Olympic Committee
- Website: www.olympic.ca

in Paris, France 26 July 2024 – 11 August 2024
- Competitors: 315 (123 men and 192 women) in 28 sports
- Flag bearers (opening): Andre De Grasse & Maude Charron
- Flag bearers (closing): Ethan Katzberg & Summer McIntosh
- Coaches: TBD
- Officials: Bruny Surin (chef de mission)
- Medals Ranked 12th: Gold 9 Silver 7 Bronze 11 Total 27

Summer Olympics appearances (overview)
- ~~1900~~; 1904; 1908; 1912; 1920; 1924; 1928; 1932; 1936; 1948; 1952; 1956; 1960; 1964; 1968; 1972; 1976; 1980; 1984; 1988; 1992; 1996; 2000; 2004; 2008; 2012; 2016; 2020; 2024; 2028

Other related appearances
- 1906 Intercalated Games

Canada competed at the 2024 Summer Olympics in Paris, France from July 26 to August 11, 2024. Since Canada's debut in 1900, Canadian athletes have appeared in every edition of the Summer Olympic Games, except for the 1980 Summer Olympics in Moscow because of the country's support for the United States-led boycott.

Canada's final team consisted of 315 (123 men and 192 women) athletes. On July 16, 2024 a final team of 316 athletes, along with 22 alternates, were confirmed by the Canadian Olympic Committee. Athletes from nine of the country's provinces and territories are represented on the team. The following day, decathlete Pierce LePage withdrew from the team due to injury, which brought the team to 315 athletes. On July 24, 2024, sprinter Andre De Grasse and weightlifter Maude Charron were named as the country's flagbearers for the opening ceremony. Meanwhile, on August 11, 2024 Olympic champion hammer thrower Ethan Katzberg and multiple time gold medalist Summer McIntosh were named as Canada's closing ceremony flagbearers.

Canadian athletes won 27 medals (nine gold, seven silver and 11 bronze). This meant Canada finished 12th in the medal table, and 11th in overall medals won. The 27 medals won marked the country's second best-ever total medals result (after the boycotted 1984 Summer Olympics), surpassing the 24 medals won in 2020. The nine gold medals won was also the country's second best-ever total (after the boycotted 1984 Games).

== Administration ==
In May 2022, Atlanta 1996 gold medalist Bruny Surin was named as the country's Chef De Mission. Surin was chosen for his "athletic accomplishments, philanthropy, motivational speaking skills and for being a role model for young athletes".

== Medallists ==
The following Canadian competitors won medals at the games. In the by discipline sections below, medallists' names are bolded.

Medal	Name(s)	Sport	Event	Date
Gold	Christa Deguchi	Judo	Women's 57 kg	July 29
Gold	Summer McIntosh	Swimming	Women's 400 m individual medley	July 29
Gold	Summer McIntosh	Swimming	Women's 200 m butterfly	August 1
Gold	Summer McIntosh	Swimming	Women's 200 m individual medley	August 3
Gold	Ethan Katzberg	Athletics	Men's hammer throw	August 4
Gold	Camryn Rogers	Athletics	Women's hammer throw	August 6
Gold	Jerome Blake; Aaron Brown; Andre De Grasse; Brendon Rodney	Athletics	Men's 4 × 100 m relay	August 9
Gold	Katie Vincent	Canoeing	Women's C-1 200 m	August 10
Gold	Philip Kim	Breaking	B-Boys	August 10
Silver	Summer McIntosh	Swimming	Women's 400 m freestyle	July 27
Silver	Canada women's national rugby sevens team Caroline Crossley; Olivia Apps; Alysha Corrigan; Asia Hogan-Rochester; Chloe Daniels; Charity Williams; Florence Symonds; Carissa Norsten; Krissy Scurfield; Fancy Bermudez; Piper Logan; Keyara Wardley	Rugby sevens	Women's tournament	July 30
Silver	Abigail Dent; Caileigh Filmer; Kasia Gruchalla-Wesierski; Maya Meschkuleit; Sydney Payne; Jessica Sevick; Kristina Walker; Avalon Wasteneys; Kristen Kit (cox)	Rowing	Women's eight	August 3
Silver	Josh Liendo	Swimming	Men's 100 m butterfly	August 3
Silver	Maude Charron	Weightlifting	Women's 59 kg	August 8
Silver	Melissa Humana-Paredes; Brandie Wilkerson	Beach volleyball	Women's tournament	August 9
Silver	Marco Arop	Athletics	Men's 800 m	August 10
Bronze	Eleanor Harvey	Fencing	Women's foil	July 28
Bronze	Rylan Wiens; Nathan Zsombor-Murray	Diving	Men's synchronized 10 m platform	July 29
Bronze	Ilya Kharun	Swimming	Men's 200 m butterfly	July 31
Bronze	Sophiane Méthot	Gymnastics	Women's trampoline	August 2
Bronze	Félix Auger-Aliassime; Gabriela Dabrowski	Tennis	Mixed doubles	August 2
Bronze	Kylie Masse	Swimming	Women's 200 m backstroke	August 2
Bronze	Ilya Kharun	Swimming	Men's 100 m butterfly	August 3
Bronze	Wyatt Sanford	Boxing	Men's 63.5 kg	August 4
Bronze	Alysha Newman	Athletics	Women's pole vault	August 7
Bronze	Skylar Park	Taekwondo	Women's 57 kg	August 8
Bronze	Sloan MacKenzie; Katie Vincent	Canoeing	Women's C-2 500 m	August 9

**Medals by discipline/sport**
**Sport**	1st place, gold medalist(s)	2nd place, silver medalist(s)	3rd place, bronze medalist(s)	Total
Swimming	3	2	3	8
Athletics	3	1	1	5
Canoeing	1	0	1	2
Breaking	1	0	0	1
Judo	1	0	0	1
Beach volleyball	0	1	0	1
Rowing	0	1	0	1
Rugby sevens	0	1	0	1
Weightlifting	0	1	0	1
Boxing	0	0	1	1
Diving	0	0	1	1
Fencing	0	0	1	1
Gymnastics	0	0	1	1
Taekwondo	0	0	1	1
Tennis	0	0	1	1
**Total**	**9**	**7**	**11**	**27**

Medals by date
**Date**	1st place, gold medalist(s)	2nd place, silver medalist(s)	3rd place, bronze medalist(s)	Total
July 27	0	1	0	1
July 28	0	0	1	1
July 29	2	0	1	3
July 30	0	1	0	1
July 31	0	0	1	1
August 1	1	0	0	1
August 2	0	0	3	3
August 3	1	2	1	4
August 4	1	0	1	2
August 5	0	0	0	0
August 6	1	0	0	1
August 7	0	0	1	1
August 8	0	1	1	2
August 9	1	1	1	3
August 10	2	1	0	3
August 11	0	0	0	0
**Total**	**9**	**7**	**11**	27

Multiple medallists
Name	Sport	1st place, gold medalist(s)	2nd place, silver medalist(s)	3rd place, bronze medalist(s)	Total
Summer McIntosh	Swimming	3	1	0	**4**
Katie Vincent	Canoeing	1	0	1	**2**
Ilya Kharun	Swimming	0	0	2	**2**

== Competitors ==
The following list is the number of competitors who will compete at the Games.

Sport	Men	Women	Total
Archery	1	1	2
Artistic Swimming	0	8	8
Athletics	22	26	48
Badminton	3	1	4
Basketball	12	16	28
Boxing	1	1	2
Breaking	1	0	1
Canoeing	6	9	15
Cycling	11	11	22
Diving	2	3	5
Equestrian	4	5	9
Fencing	7	5	12
Football (soccer)	0	18	18
Golf	2	2	4
Gymnastics	5	6	11
Judo	3	4	7
Rowing	0	11	11
Rugby sevens	0	12	12
Sailing	2	4	6
Shooting	2	1	3
Skateboarding	3	1	4
Surfing	0	1	1
Swimming	12	17	29
Table tennis	3	1	4
Taekwondo	0	2	2
Tennis	2	3	5
Triathlon	2	1	3
Volleyball	14	4	18
Water Polo	0	13	13
Weightlifting	1	1	2
Wrestling	2	4	6
Total	123	192	315

== Archery ==
Canada qualified one male archer through a top three finish in the individual recurve event at the 2023 World Archery Championships in Berlin, Germany. Canada qualified a female archer through a first place finish in the individual recurve event at the Pan American continental qualifier in Medellin, Colombia. The final team was named on June 28, 2024.

Athlete	Event	Ranking round		Round of 64	Round of 32	Round of 16	Quarterfinals	Semifinals	Final / BM	
Athlete	Event	Score	Seed	Opposition Score	Opposition Score	Opposition Score	Opposition Score	Opposition Score	Opposition Score	Rank
Eric Peters	Men's individual	659	36	Abdullin (KAZ); W 6–4	Bommadevara (IND); W 6–5	Nespoli (ITA); L 2–6	Did not advance			=9
Virginie Chénier	Women's individual	649	33	Octavia (INA); L 2–6	Did not advance					=33
Eric Peters; Virginie Chénier	Mixed team	1308	20	—N/a		Did not advance				20

== Artistic swimming ==
Canada qualified a full team of eight artistic swimmers. The team qualified by being the fifth best unqualified team across the acrobatic, free and technical routines at the 2024 World Aquatics Championships in Doha, Qatar. By qualifying a team, Canada was also allowed to enter a pair into the duet event. The final team was named on June 10, 2024.

Athlete	Event	Technical routine		Free routine		Acrobatic routine		Total	
Athlete	Event	Points	Rank	Points	Rank	Points	Rank	Points	Rank
Audrey Lamothe; Jacqueline Simoneau	Duet	201.5167	15	290.9103	3	—N/a		492.4270	9
Scarlett Finn; Audrey Lamothe; Jonnie Newman; Raphaelle Plante; Kenzie Priddell; Claire Scheffel; Jacqueline Simoneau; Florence Tremblay	Team	262.4808	7	343.6854	5	253.0567	6	859.2229	6

== Athletics ==
48 track and field athletes (22 men and 26 women) achieved entry standards either by meeting the entry standard or through the world rankings (a maximum of 3 athletes or one relay per event). The mixed marathon and track relay team, both qualified through the 2024 World Athletics Race Walking Team Championships in Antalya, Turkey, and 2024 World Athletics Relays in Nassau, Bahamas respectively. Ultimately, the final team was selected using various criteria set by Athletics Canada. On February 7, 2024, Cameron Levins and Malindi Elmore were the first two athletes named to the team. On May 14, 2024, a further four athletes were named to the team. The final team of 48 athletes (23 men and 25 women) was named on July 2, 2024. On July 5, 2024, a further three athletes (one man and two women) were added to the team as part of the reallocation process, bringing the team to 51 athletes (24 men and 27 women). Originally, Malachi Murray and Madeline Price were named to the team. However, they were later confirmed as relay alternates. On July 17, defending World Champion decathlete Pierce LePage withdrew from the team due to injury, which brought the team to 48 athletes. Eliezer Adjibi and Duan Asemota did not compete.

Key

- Note –Ranks given are within the athlete's heat.
- Q = Qualified for the next round
- q = Qualified for the next round as a fastest loser or, in field events, by position without achieving the qualifying target
- R = Repechage
- SB = Season Best
- NR = National record
- N/A = Round not applicable for the event
- Bye = Athlete not required to compete in round

Track and road events

Men

Athlete	Event	Preliminary		Heat		Repechage		Semifinal		Final	
Athlete	Event	Time	Rank	Time	Rank	Time	Rank	Time	Rank	Time	Rank
Duan Asemota	100 m	Bye		10.17	5	—N/a		Did not advance			
Aaron Brown	100 m	Bye		DQ		—N/a		Did not advance			
Andre De Grasse	100 m	Bye		10.07	3 Q	—N/a		9.98 SB	5	Did not advance	
Aaron Brown	200 m	—N/a		20.36	4 R	20.42	2 q	20.57	7	Did not advance	
Andre De Grasse	200 m	—N/a		20.30	2 Q	Bye		20.41	3	Did not advance	
Brendon Rodney	200 m	—N/a		20.30 SB	4 R	20.42 (.418)	3 Q	20.59	5	Did not advance	
Christopher Morales Williams	400 m	—N/a		44.96	2 Q	Bye		45.25	21	Did not advance	
Marco Arop	800 m	—N/a		1:45.74	2 Q	Bye		1:45.05	1 Q	1:41.20 AR	2nd place, silver medalist(s)
Kieran Lumb	1500 m	—N/a		3:38.11	10 R	3:35.76	5	Did not advance			
Charles Philibert-Thiboutot	1500 m	—N/a		3:36.92	14 R	3:33.53 SB	2 Q	3:33.29	11	Did not advance	
Mohammed Ahmed	5000 m	—N/a		14:15.76	16	—N/a				Did not advance	
Ben Flanagan	5000 m	—N/a		13:59.23	17	—N/a				Did not advance	
Thomas Fafard	5000 m	—N/a		14:09.37	8 Q	—N/a				13:49.7	22
Mohammed Ahmed	10,000 m	—N/a								26:43.79	4
Craig Thorne	110 m hurdles	—N/a		13.60	7 R	13.62	5	Did not advance			
Jean-Simon Desgagnés	3000 m steeplechase	—N/a		8:25.28	5 Q	—N/a				8:19.31	13
Jerome Blake; Aaron Brown; Andre De Grasse; Brendon Rodney	4 × 100 m relay	—N/a		38.39	3 Q	—N/a				37.50	1st place, gold medalist(s)
Cameron Levins	Marathon	—N/a								2:11:56 SB	36
Rory Linkletter	Marathon	—N/a								2:13:09	47
Evan Dunfee	20 km walk	—N/a								1:19:16	5

Women

Athlete	Event	Preliminary		Heat		Repechage		Semifinal		Final	
Athlete	Event	Time	Rank	Time	Rank	Time	Rank	Time	Rank	Time	Rank
Audrey Leduc	100 m	Bye		10.95 NR	1 Q	—N/a		11.10	5	Did not advance	
Jacqueline Madogo	100 m	Bye		11.27	4	—N/a		Did not advance			
Audrey Leduc	200 m	—N/a		22.88	3 Q	Bye		22.68	6	Did not advance	
Jacqueline Madogo	200 m	—N/a		22.78 PB	4 R	22.58 PB	1 Q	22.81	7	Did not advance	
Lauren Gale	400 m	—N/a		53.13	6 R	52.68	6	Did not advance			
Zoe Sherar	400 m	—N/a		51.97	7 R	51.43	3	Did not advance			
Jazz Shukla	800 m	—N/a		2:00.80	5 R	2:02.00	2	Did not advance			
Kate Current	1500 m	—N/a		4:09.81	12 R	4:08.91	10	Did not advance			
Simone Plourde	1500 m	—N/a		4:06.59	9 R	4:08.49	6	Did not advance			
Lucia Stafford	1500 m	—N/a		4:02.22	10 R	4:02.26	5	Did not advance			
Briana Scott	5000 m	—N/a		15:47.30	19	—N/a				Did not advance	
Mariam Abdul-Rashid	100 m hurdles	—N/a		12.80	5 q	Bye		12.60 PB	5	Did not advance	
Michelle Harrison	100 m hurdles	—N/a		13.40	8	13.30	7	Did not advance			
Savannah Sutherland	400 m hurdles	—N/a		54.80	3 Q	Bye		53.80	6 q	53.88	7
Ceili McCabe	3000 m steeplechase	—N/a		9:20.71	7	—N/a				Did not advance	
Regan Yee	3000 m steeplechase	—N/a		9:27.81	12	—N/a				Did not advance	
Malindi Elmore	Marathon	—N/a								2:31:08	35
Marie-Éloïse Leclair; Audrey Leduc; Jacqueline Madogo; Sade McCreath	4 × 100 m relay	—N/a		42.50 NR	7 q	—N/a				42.69	6
Kyra Constantine; Lauren Gale; Zoe Sherar; Aiyanna Stiverne; Savannah Sutherland	4 × 400 m relay	—N/a		3:25.77	8 q	—N/a				3:22.01 SB	6

Mixed

Athlete	Event	Final	
Athlete	Event	Time	Rank
Evan Dunfee; Olivia Lundman	Marathon race walking relay	3:04:57 NR	20

Field events

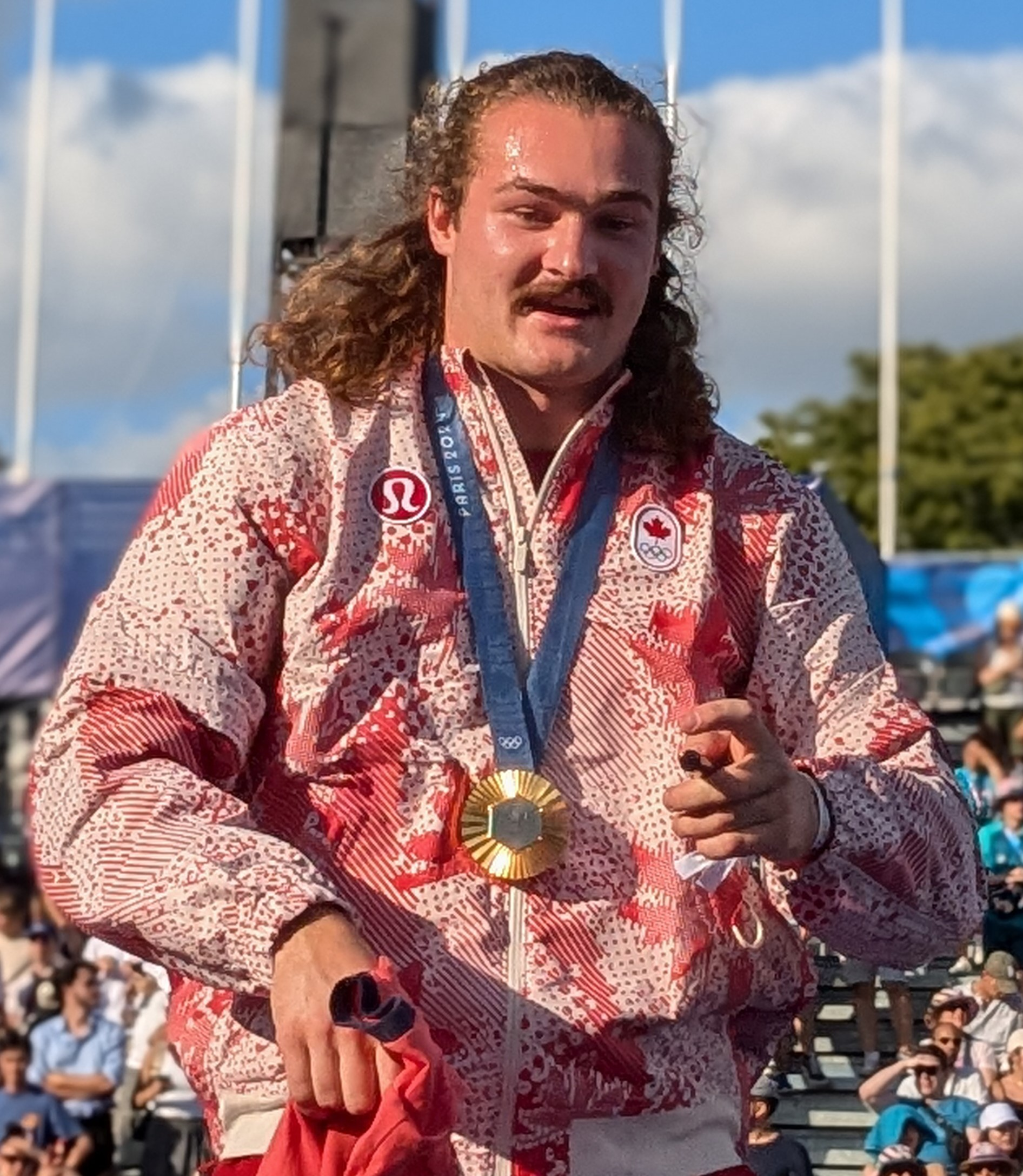
Ethan Katzberg pictured with his gold medal he won in the men's hammer throw event

Athlete	Event	Qualification		Final	
Athlete	Event	Result	Rank	Result	Rank
Rowan Hamilton	Men's hammer throw	77.78 PB	2 Q	76.59	9
Ethan Katzberg	Men's hammer throw	79.93	1 Q	84.12	1st place, gold medalist(s)
Adam Keenan	Men's hammer throw	74.45 SB	13	Did not advance	
Camryn Rogers	Women's hammer throw	74.69	2 Q	76.97	1st place, gold medalist(s)
Anicka Newell	Women's pole vault	4.40	26	Did not advance	
Alysha Newman	Women's pole vault	4.55	7 q	4.85 NR	3rd place, bronze medalist(s)
Sarah Mitton	Women's shot put	19.77	1 Q	17.48	12

Combined events – Men's decathlon

Athlete	Event	100 m	LJ	SP	HJ	400 m	110H	DT	PV	JT	1500 m	Final	Rank
Damian Warner	Result	10.25	7.79	14.45	2.02 SB	47.34 SB	13.62	48.68 SB	NM	WD		DNF	
Damian Warner	Points	1035	1007	756	822	941	1024	843	0	DNF		DNF	

== Badminton ==
Canada qualified four badminton players (three men and one woman) through the BWF Race to Paris rankings as of April 30, 2024. The final team was named on May 15, 2024.

Athlete	Event	Group stage				Elimination	Quarterfinal	Semifinal	Final / BM	
Athlete	Event	Opposition Score	Opposition Score	Opposition Score	Rank	Opposition Score	Opposition Score	Opposition Score	Opposition Score	Rank
Brian Yang	Men's singles	Panarin (KAZ); W 2–0 (21–18, 21–10)	Nishimoto (JPN); L 0–2 (14–21, 18–21)	—N/a	2	Did not advance				=14
Adam Dong; Nyl Yakura	Men's doubles	Weikeng / Chang (CHN); L 0–2 (5–21, 12–21)	Chia / Yik (MAS); L 0–2 (10–21, 15–21)	Lane / Vendy (GBR); L 0–2 (14–21, 12–21)	4	Did not advance				=13
Michelle Li	Women's singles	Thuzar (MYA); W 2–0 (21–16, 25–23)	Yamaguchi (JPN); L 1–2 (24–22, 17–21, 12–21)	—N/a	2	Did not advance				=14

== Basketball ==
Canada qualified 28 basketball athletes (12 men and 16 women). Both 5×5 teams qualified along with the women's 3x3 team.

=== 5×5 basketball ===
Canada qualified two basketball teams, for a total of 24 athletes (12 per team).

Summary

Team	Event	Group stage				Quarterfinal	Semifinal	Final / BM	
Team	Event	Opposition Score	Opposition Score	Opposition Score	Rank	Opposition Score	Opposition Score	Opposition Score	Rank
Canada men's	Men's tournament	Greece; W 86–79	Australia; W 93–83	Spain; W 88–85	1 Q	France; L 73–83	Did not advance		5
Canada women's	Women's tournament	France; L 54–75	Australia; L 65–70	Nigeria; L 70–79	4	Did not advance			11

==== Men's tournament ====
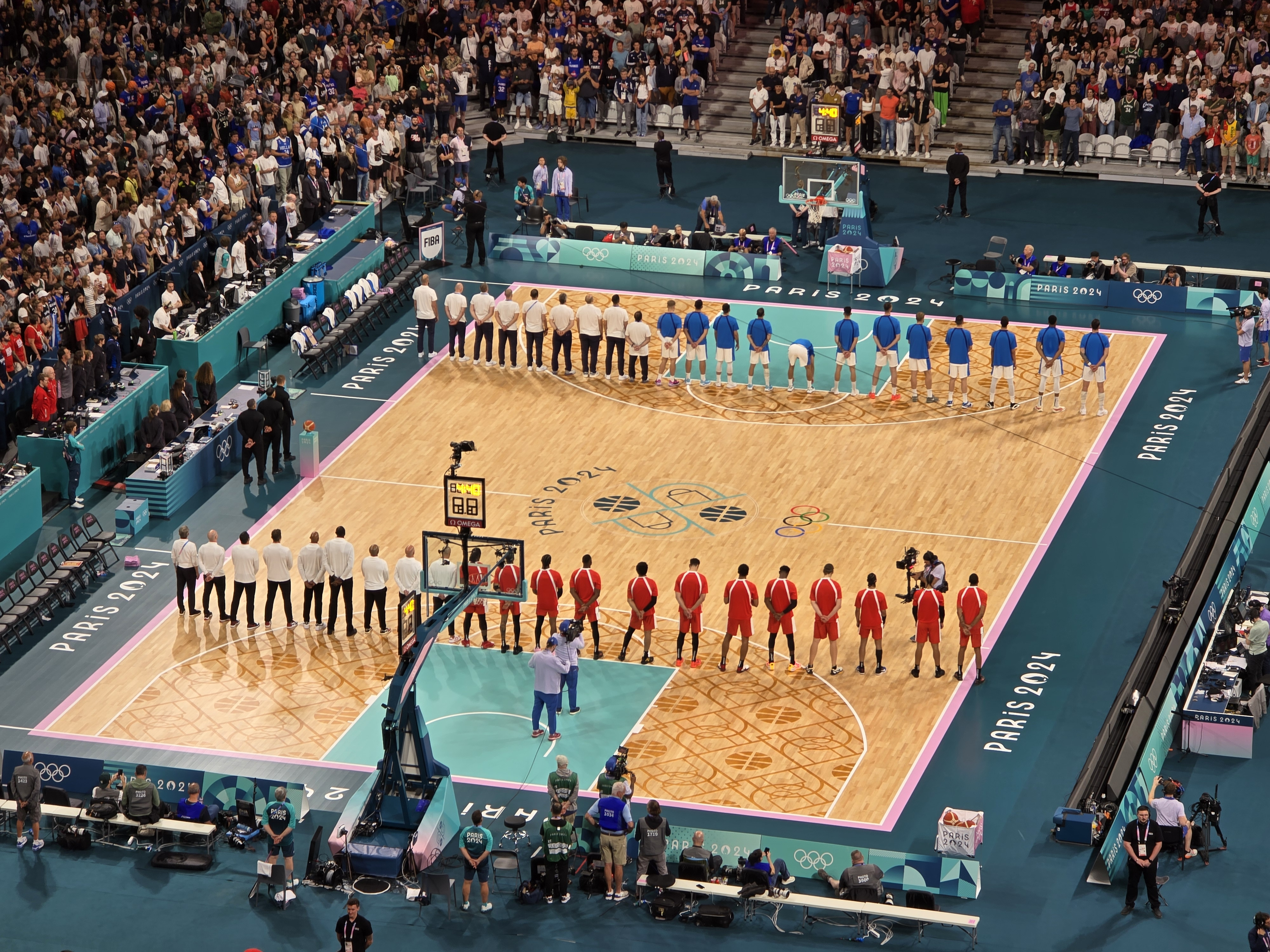
Canada versus Greece pre-game

For the first time since 2000, Canada men's basketball team qualified as one of the two highest ranked nations from the Americas at the 2023 FIBA Basketball World Cup.

Team roster

Canada's roster of 12 athletes was named on July 10, 2024.

Canada Men's National Basketball Team – 2024 Summer Olympics roster
Players
Coaches

Pos.	No.	Name	Age – Date of birth	Height	Club	Ctr.
G/F	0	Luguentz Dort	25 – 19 April 1999	1.94 m (6 ft 4 in)	Oklahoma City Thunder	(United States)
SG	1	Nickeil Alexander-Walker	25 – 2 September 1998	1.96 m (6 ft 5 in)	Minnesota Timberwolves	(United States)
PG	2	Shai Gilgeous-Alexander	26 – 12 July 1998	1.98 m (6 ft 6 in)	Oklahoma City Thunder	(United States)
SF	3	Melvin Ejim	33 – 4 March 1991	2.01 m (6 ft 7 in)	Unicaja Málaga	(Spain)
PG	4	Jamal Murray	27 – 23 February 1997	1.93 m (6 ft 4 in)	Denver Nuggets	(United States)
C	7	Dwight Powell	33 – 20 July 1991	2.12 m (6 ft 11 in)	Dallas Mavericks	(United States)
PF	8	Trey Lyles	28 – 5 November 1995	2.08 m (6 ft 10 in)	Sacramento Kings	(United States)
G/F	9	RJ Barrett	24 – 14 June 2000	1.95 m (6 ft 5 in)	Toronto Raptors	(Canada)
F/C	13	Kelly Olynyk (C)	33 – 19 April 1991	2.11 m (6 ft 11 in)	Toronto Raptors	(Canada)
PG	19	Andrew Nembhard	24 – 16 January 2000	1.87 m (6 ft 2 in)	Indiana Pacers	(United States)
SF	24	Dillon Brooks	28 – 22 January 1996	1.98 m (6 ft 6 in)	Houston Rockets	(United States)
C	92	Khem Birch	31 – 28 September 1992	2.06 m (6 ft 9 in)	Bàsquet Girona	(Spain)

Head coach

- (Spain) Jordi Fernández

Assistant coach(es)

- (United States) Nate Bjorkgren
- (Canada) Philip Jevtovic
- (Canada) Michael Meeks
- (Canada) Nathaniel Mitchell

Legend

- (C) Team captain
- Club – describes last
  club before the competition
- Age – describes age
  on 27 July 2024

Group play

Pos	Team	Pld	W	L	PF	PA	PD	Pts	Qualification
1	Canada	3	3	0	267	247	+20	6	Quarterfinals
2	Australia	3	1	2	246	250	−4	4 (Note: Australia 3 Pts, +6 PD; Greece 3 Pts, −1 PD; Spain 3 Pts, −5 PD.)	Quarterfinals
3	Greece	3	1	2	233	241	−8	4	Quarterfinals
4	Spain	3	1	2	249	257	−8	4	

Source: FIBA
Rules for classification: 1) classification points; 2) head-to-head results; 3) head-to-head game points difference; 4) head-to-head number of game points scored.
Notes:

27 July 2024
21:00

Boxscore

Greece	79–86	Canada
Scoring by quarter: 22–26, 16–22, 22–20, 19–18
Pts: Antetokounmpo 34; Rebs: Mitoglou 8 Asts: Calathes 7		Pts: Barrett 23; Rebs: Olynyk 6 Asts: Gilgeous-Alexander 7

Stade Pierre-Mauroy, Lille
Attendance: 26,421
Referees: Roberto Vázquez (PUR), Johnny Batista (PUR), Wojciech Liszka (POL)

30 July 2024
13:30

Boxscore

Canada	93–83	Australia
Scoring by quarter: 26–28, 19–21, 27–21, 21–13
Pts: Barrett 24; Rebs: Powell 9 Asts: Barrett, Murray 5		Pts: Giddey 19; Rebs: Landale 12; Asts: Giddey 6

Stade Pierre-Mauroy, Lille
Attendance: 26,980
Referees: Yohan Rosso (FRA), Johnny Batista (PUR), Takaki Kato (JPN)

2 August 2024
17:15

Boxscore

Canada	88–85	Spain
Scoring by quarter: 19–19, 30–19, 15–18, 24–29
Pts: Gilgeous-Alexander 20; Rebs: Brooks, Murray 4 Asts: Murray 6		Pts: Brizuela 17; Rebs: Aldama 11; Asts: three players 4

Stade Pierre-Mauroy, Lille
Attendance: 26,133
Referees: Ademir Zurapović (BIH), Julio Anaya (PAN), Gatis Saliņš (LAT)

Quarterfinals

6 August 2024
18:00

Boxscore

France	82–73	Canada
Scoring by quarter: 23–10, 22–19, 16–21, 21–23
Pts: Yabusele 22; Rebs: Wembanyama 12; Asts: Wembanyama 5		Pts: Gilgeous-Alexander 27; Rebs: Powell 9 Asts: Gilgeous-Alexander 4

Accor Arena, Paris
Attendance: 12,258
Referees: Ademir Zurapović (BIH), Omar Bermúdez (MEX), Gatis Saliņš (LAT)

==== Women's tournament ====
Canada's women's basketball team qualified by finishing in the top three at the 2024 Olympic Qualifying Tournament in Sopron, Hungary.

Team roster

Canada's roster of 12 athletes was named on July 2, 2024.

Canada women's national basketball team – 2024 Summer Olympics roster
Players
Coaches

Pos.	No.	Name	Age – Date of birth	Height	Club	Ctr.
G	2	Shay Colley	28 – 6 January 1996	1.76 m (5 ft 9 in)	Tango Bourges Basket	(France)
G	4	Sami Hill	29 – 22 November 1994	1.78 m (5 ft 10 in)	Araski	(Spain)
G	5	Kia Nurse	28 – 22 February 1996	1.82 m (6 ft 0 in)	Los Angeles Sparks	(United States)
SF	6	Bridget Carleton	27 – 22 May 1997	1.85 m (6 ft 1 in)	Minnesota Lynx	(United States)
G	8	Cassandre Prosper	19 – 25 June 2005	1.88 m (6 ft 2 in)	Notre Dame Fighting Irish	(United States)
PF	9	Yvonne Ejim	22 – 9 April 2002	1.82 m (6 ft 0 in)	Gonzaga Bulldogs	(United States)
C	11	Natalie Achonwa (C)	31 – 22 November 1992	1.91 m (6 ft 3 in)	Free agent
G	12	Syla Swords	18 – 28 January 2006	1.82 m (6 ft 0 in)	Michigan Wolverines	(United States)
C	14	Kayla Alexander	33 – 5 January 1991	1.93 m (6 ft 4 in)	Valencia Basket	(Spain)
F	15	Laeticia Amihere	23 – 10 July 2001	1.86 m (6 ft 1 in)	Atlanta Dream	(United States)
G	21	Nirra Fields	30 – 3 December 1993	1.76 m (5 ft 9 in)	Emlak Konut SK	(Turkey)
F	24	Aaliyah Edwards	22 – 9 July 2002	1.91 m (6 ft 3 in)	Washington Mystics	(United States)

Head coach

- (Spain) Víctor Lapeña

Assistant coach(es)

- (Canada) Steve Baur
- (Canada) Carly Clarke
- (United States) Murriel Page
- (United States) Noelle Quinn

Legend

- (C) Team captain
- Club – describes last
  club before the tournament
- Age – describes age
  on 28 July 2024

Group play

Pos	Team	Pld	W	L	PF	PA	PD	Pts	Qualification
1	France (H)	3	2	1	222	187	+35	5 (Note: France 3 Pts, +14 PD; Australia 3 Pts, −6 PD; Nigeria 3 Pts, −8 PD.)	Quarterfinals
2	Australia	3	2	1	211	212	−1	5	Quarterfinals
3	Nigeria	3	2	1	208	207	+1	5	Quarterfinals
4	Canada	3	0	3	189	224	−35	3	

Source: FIBA
Rules for classification: 1) classification points; 2) head-to-head results; 3) head-to-head game points difference; 4) head-to-head number of game points scored.
(H) Hosts
Notes:

29 July 2024
17:15

Boxscore

Canada	54–75	France
Scoring by quarter: 18–15, 2–23, 16–15, 18–22
Pts: Colley, Nurse 11; Rebs: Alexander 10; Asts: Colley 6		Pts: Badiane 13; Rebs: Badiane 6 Asts: Williams 8

Stade Pierre-Mauroy, Lille
Attendance: 20,211
Referees: Boris Krejić (SLO), Blanca Burns (USA), Ariadna Chueca (ESP)

1 August 2024
13:30

Boxscore

Australia	70–65	Canada
Scoring by quarter: 18–16, 20–16, 13–12, 19–21
Pts: Whitcomb 19; Rebs: Talbot 9 Asts: Whitcomb 10		Pts: Carleton 19; Rebs: Carleton 8 Asts: Achonwa 8

Stade Pierre-Mauroy, Lille
Attendance: 20,962
Referees: Andrés Bartel (URU), Rabah Noujaim (LBN), Jenna Reneau (USA)

4 August 2024
13:30

Boxscore

Canada	70–79	Nigeria
Scoring by quarter: 18–18, 23–19, 5–23, 24–19
Pts: Colley 17; Rebs: Amihere 11; Asts: five players 2		Pts: Kalu 21; Rebs: Kunaiyi-Akpannah 7 Asts: Amukamara 6

Stade Pierre-Mauroy, Lille
Attendance: 27,107
Referees: Amy Bonner (USA), Blanca Burns (USA), Ariadna Chueca (ESP)

=== 3×3 basketball ===
Summary

Team	Event	Group stage								Play-in	Semifinal	Final / BM	
Team	Event	Opposition Score	Opposition Score	Opposition Score	Opposition Score	Opposition Score	Opposition Score	Opposition Score	Rank	Opposition Score	Opposition Score	Opposition Score	Rank
Canada women's	Women's tournament	Australia; W 22–14	China; W 21–11	Germany; L 15–19	France; W 13–9	United States; L 17–18	Spain; L 20–22	Azerbaijan; W 21–19	4 Q	Australia; W 21–10	Germany; L 15–16	United States; L 13–16	4

==== Women's tournament ====
The Canadian women's 3x3 team qualified by finishing in the top three at the 2024 Olympic Qualifying Tournament in Debrecen, Hungary.

Team roster

The roster was announced on June 10, 2024.

- Kacie Bosch
- Paige Crozon
- Katherine Plouffe
- Michelle Plouffe

Group play

Pos	Team	Pld	W	L	PF	PA	PD	Qualification
1	Germany	7	6	1	117	100	+17	Semifinals
2	Spain	7	4 (Note: Spain 2–1; United States 2–1; Canada 1–2; Australia 1–2. Sorted by points scored after first tie broken.)	3	115	114	+1	Semifinals
3	United States	7	4	3	108	109	−1	Play-ins
4	Canada	7	4	3	129	112	+17	Play-ins
5	Australia	7	4	3	127	122	+5	Play-ins
6	China	7	2 (Note: China 1–1; France 1–1; Azerbaijan 1–1. Sorted by points scored.)	5	107	123	−16	Play-ins
7	Azerbaijan	7	2	5	106	123	−17	
8	France (H)	7	2	5	99	105	−6	

Source: FIBA
Rules for classification: 1) Wins; 2) Head-to-head record; 3) Points scored.
(H) Hosts
Notes:

30 July 2024
18:00

Boxscore

Australia	14–22	Canada
Pts: Wilson 6		Pts: K. Plouffe 10

Place de la Concorde, Paris
Referees: Najib Chajiddine (FRA), Shi Qirong (CHN)

31 July 2024
18:00

Boxscore

Canada	21–11	China
Pts: Crozon, M. Plouffe 7		Pts: Chen 5

Place de la Concorde, Paris
Referees: Deanna Jackson (USA), Najib Chajiddine (FRA)

1 August 2024
09:30

Boxscore

Germany	19–15	Canada
Pts: Greinacher 8		Pts: K. Plouffe, M. Plouffe 5

Place de la Concorde, Paris
Referees: Jasmina Juras (SRB), Dorothy Okatch (BOT)

1 August 2024
22:00

Boxscore

Canada	13–9	France
Pts: Crozon, K. Plouffe 4		Pts: Limouzin 4

Place de la Concorde, Paris
Referees: Kim Ga-in (KOR), Shi Qirong (CHN)

2 August 2024
18:00

Boxscore

United States	18–17 (OT)	Canada
Pts: Howard 7		Pts: K. Plouffe 10

Place de la Concorde, Paris
Referees: Kim Ga-in (KOR), Najib Chajiddine (FRA)

2 August 2024
21:00

Boxscore

Canada	20–22 (OT)	Spain
Pts: M. Plouffe 11		Pts: Ygueravide 10

Place de la Concorde, Paris
Referees: Shi Qirong (CHN), Markos Michaelides (SUI)

3 August 2024
17:30

Boxscore

Azerbaijan	19–21	Canada
Pts: Hayes 9		Pts: M. Plouffe 8

Place de la Concorde, Paris
Referees: Dorothy Okatch (BOT), Edmond Ho (HKG)

Play-in

3 August 2024
21:30

Boxscore

Canada	21–10	Australia
Pts: Bosch 9		Pts: Maley 5

Place de la Concorde, Paris
Referees: Najib Chajiddine (FRA), Deanna Jackson (USA)

Semifinal

5 August 2024
18:30

Boxscore

Germany	16–15	Canada
Pts: Greinacher 11		Pts: three players 4

Place de la Concorde, Paris
Referees: Jasmina Juras (SRB), Najib Chajiddine (FRA)

Bronze medal game

5 August 2024
21:00

Boxscore

Canada	13–16	United States
Pts: K. Plouffe 5		Pts: Van Lith 6

Place de la Concorde, Paris
Referees: Najib Chajiddine (FRA), Shi Qirong (CHN)

== Boxing ==
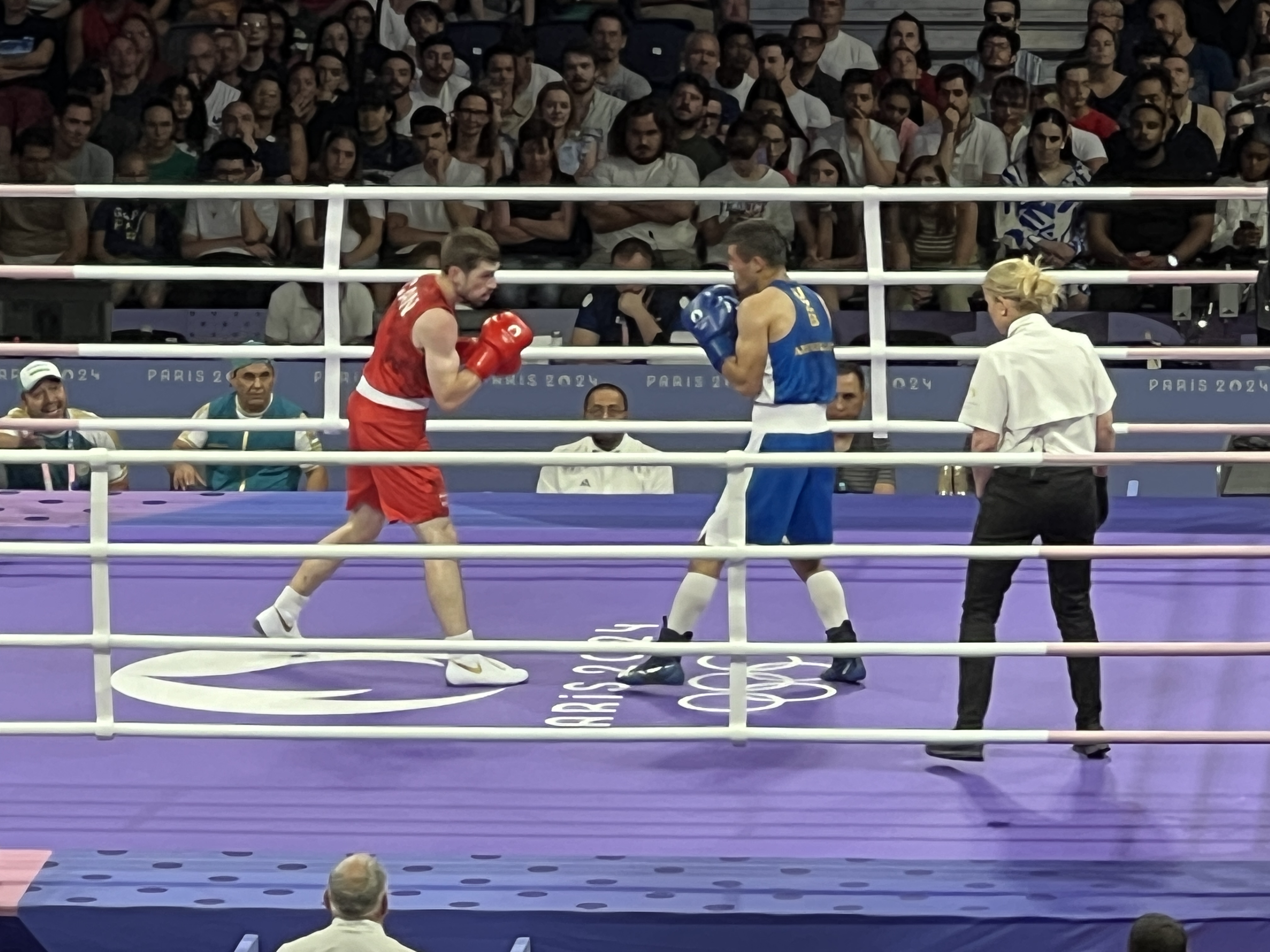
Wyatt Sanford boxing during the quarterfinals

Canada qualified two boxers (one per gender). Wyatt Sanford (men's 63.5kg) and Tammara Thibeault (women's 75kg) qualified by advancing to their respective gold medal matches at the 2023 Pan American Games in Santiago, Chile. Both boxers were officially named to the team on July 2, 2024. Wyatt Sanford went on to win the bronze medal, in the men's 63.5 kg event. This marked Canada's first boxing medal since 1996.

Athlete	Event	Round of 32	Round of 16	Quarterfinals	Semifinals	Final	
Athlete	Event	Opposition Result	Opposition Result	Opposition Result	Opposition Result	Opposition Result	Rank
Wyatt Sanford	Men's 63.5 kg	Bye	Rosenov (BUL); W 5–0	Abdullaev (UZB); W 4–1	Oumiha (FRA); L 1–4	Did not advance	3rd place, bronze medalist(s)
Tammara Thibeault	Women's 75 kg	—N/a	Ngamba (EOR); L 2–3	Did not advance			=9

== Breaking ==
Canada qualified one male breakdancer. Philip Kim (Phil Wizard) qualified through his gold medal performance in the B-Boys event at the 2023 Pan American Games in Santiago, Chile. Philip Kim was named officially to the team on July 3, 2024.

Athlete	Nickname	Event	Round-Robin		Quarterfinal	Semifinal	Final / BM	
Athlete	Nickname	Event	Points	Rank	Opposition Result	Opposition Result	Opposition Result	Rank
Philip Kim	Phil Wizard	B-Boys	40	1 Q	Lee (NED); W 3–0 (19–8)	Nakarai (JPN); W 3–0 (17–10)	Civil (FRA); W 3–0 (23–4)	1st place, gold medalist(s)

== Canoeing ==
Canada qualified a total of 15 canoeists. Two qualified in slalom (one per gender) and 13 qualified in sprint (five men and eight women).

=== Slalom ===
Canada qualified two slalom canoeists through the 2024 Pan American Canoe Slalom Olympic Qualifiers, in Rio de Janeiro, Brazil. The team was officially named on May 8, 2024. Both canoeists will be making their Olympic debuts.

Athlete	Event	Preliminary						Semifinal		Final	
Athlete	Event	Run 1	Rank	Run 2	Rank	Best	Rank	Time	Rank	Time	Rank
Alex Baldoni	Men's C-1	97.32	13	98.56	10	97.32	15 Q	127.41	15	Did not advance	15
Alex Baldoni	Men's K-1	95.18	17	97.25	16	95.18	17	Did not advance			21
Lois Betteridge	Women's C-1	120.22	19	115.60	16	115.60	19	Did not advance			19
Lois Betteridge	Women's K-1	106.45	21	106.21	21	106.21	22 Q	127.67	20	Did not advance	20

Kayak cross

Athlete	Event	Time trial		Round 1	Repechage	Heat	Quarterfinal	Semifinal	Final	
Athlete	Event	Time	Rank	Position	Position	Position	Position	Position	Position	Rank
Alex Baldoni	Men's KX-1	73.70	24	2 Q	Bye	4	Did not advance			29
Lois Betteridge	Women's KX-1	79.76 FLT (R)	37	4 R	2 Q	3	Did not advance			24

=== Sprint ===
Canada qualified six boats and thirteen athlete spots (four in men's kayak, one in men's canoe, five in women's kayak, and three in women's canoe). All quota spots except the men's canoe quota was earned 2023 ICF Canoe Sprint World Championships in Duisburg, Germany. The men's canoe quota was earned at the 2024 Pan American Canoe Sprint Olympic Qualifiers in Sarasota, United States. The final team was named on June 24, 2024.

Key

- Note–Ranks given for sprint events are within the athlete's heat only
- Qualification Legend: FA =Qualify to final (medal); FB =Qualify to final B (non-medal);FC =Qualify to final C (non-medal); QF =Qualify to quarterfinal; SF =Qualify to semifinal; WB =World's best time

Men

Athlete	Event	Heats		Quarterfinals		Semifinals		Final	
Athlete	Event	Time	Rank	Time	Rank	Time	Rank	Time	Rank
Connor Fitzpatrick	C-1 1000 m	3:50.79	2 SF	Bye		3:56.31	8 FB	3:52.46	14
Pierre-Luc Poulin; Simon McTavish	K-2 500 m	1:28.91	3 QF	1:30.01	3 SF	1:29.01	6 FB	1:30.80	10
Laurent Lavigne; Nicholas Matveev; Simon McTavish; Pierre-Luc Poulin	K-4 500 m	1:22.84	5 QF	1:20:65	4 SF	1:20.70	5	Did not advance	9

Women

Athlete	Event	Heats		Quarterfinals		Semifinals		Final	
Athlete	Event	Time	Rank	Time	Rank	Time	Rank	Time	Rank
Sophia Jensen	C-1 200 m	46.80	1 SF	Bye		45.66	3 FA	45.08	6
Katie Vincent	C-1 200 m	47.22	1 SF	Bye		45.01	1 FA	44.12 WB	1st place, gold medalist(s)
Sloan MacKenzie; Katie Vincent	C-2 500 m	1:54.16	1 SF	Bye		1:55.34	1 FA	1:54.36	3rd place, bronze medalist(s)
Michelle Russell	K-1 500 m	1:51.00	3 QF	1:49.79	2 SF	1:50.28	2 FA	1:53.83	8
Riley Melanson	K-1 500 m	1:54.11	4 QF	1:50.16	3 SF	1:52.99	6 FC	1:56.36	22
Courtney Stott; Natalie Davison	K-2 500 m	1:44.35	3 QF	1:42.58	4 SF	1:42.57	8 FB	1:46.96	15
Toshka Besharah-Hrebacka; Natalie Davison; Riley Melanson; Courtney Stott	K-4 500 m	1:37.87	5 SF	Bye		1:39:24	4	Did not advance	10

== Cycling ==
Canada qualified 22 cyclists (11 per gender). An initial team of 21 cyclists was named on June 25, 2024. The 22nd cyclist (BMX freestyle) was named on June 28, 2024.

=== Road ===
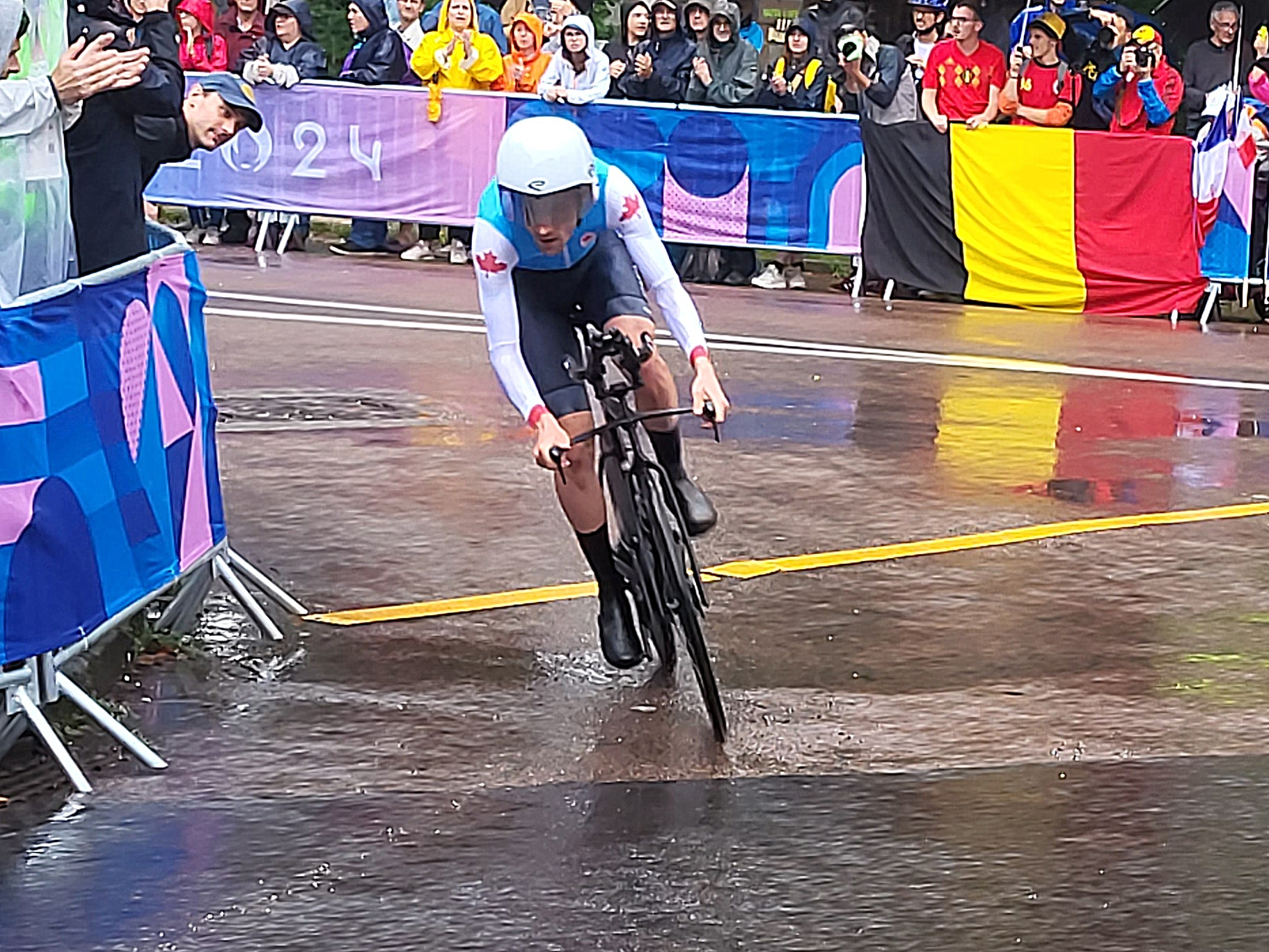
Derek Gee during the time trial

Canada entered a team of four road cyclists (two women and two men). Canada qualified two male athletes by finishing 18th and two women by finishing 11th in the UCI Nation Ranking for each respective gender. The final team was named on June 25, 2024.

Athlete	Event	Time	Rank
Derek Gee	Men's road race	6:26:57	44
Michael Woods	Men's road race	6:26:57	41
Derek Gee	Men's time trial	38:28.17	20
Olivia Baril	Women's road race	4:07:16	44
Alison Jackson	Women's road race	4:04:23	19
Olivia Baril	Women's time trial	43:03.58	20

=== Track ===
Canada qualified a full team in the men's and women's track events (seven athletes per gender), following the release of the final UCI Olympic rankings on April 15, 2024. The final team was named on June 25, 2024.

Sprint

Athlete	Event	Qualification		Round 1	Repechage 1	Round 2	Repechage 2	Round 3	Repechage 3	Quarterfinals	Semifinals	Finals / BM	
Athlete	Event	Time Speed (km/h)	Rank	Opposition Time Speed (km/h)	Opposition Time Speed (km/h)	Opposition Time Speed (km/h)	Opposition Time Speed (km/h)	Opposition Time Speed (km/h)	Opposition Time Speed (km/h)	Opposition Time Speed (km/h)	Opposition Time Speed (km/h)	Opposition Time Speed (km/h)	Rank
Tyler Rorke	Men's sprint	9.603; 74.977	20 Q	Carlin (GBR); L 10.149; 72.296	Helal (FRA); Wammes (CAN); L 10.333; 72.610	Did not advance							21
Nick Wammes	Men's sprint	9.612; 74.906	21 Q	Hoffman (NZL); L 10.208; 74.596	Helal (FRA); Rorke (CAN); L 10.936; 72.610	Did not advance							22
Lauriane Genest	Women's sprint	10.310; 69.835	12 Q	Bayona (COL); L 10.932; 65.862	Asri (MAS); Ohta (JPN); W 10.986; 65.538	Friedrich (GER); L 10.671; 67.473	Fulton (NZL); L 10.875; 66.207	Did not advance					13
Kelsey Mitchell	Women's sprint	10.285; 70.005	10 Q	Cuadrado (COL); W 10.850; 66.359	Bye	Sato (JPN); L 10.816; 66.568	Peet (NED); W 10.846; 66.384	Andrews (NZL); L 11.033; 65.952	Clonan (AUS); Sato (JPN); W 10.613; 67.841	Friedrich (GER); L 10.991; 66.828	Did not advance	5-8 Final; L 11.373; 66.790	8

Team sprint

Athlete	Event	Qualification		First Round		Final	
Athlete	Event	Time Speed (km/h)	Rank	Opposition Time Speed (km/h)	Rank	Opposition Time Speed (km/h)	Rank
James Hedgcock; Tyler Rorke; Nick Wammes	Men's team sprint	43.905	8 Q	Netherlands; L 43.666; 61.833	8	China; L 43.944; 61.442	8
Lauriane Genest; Kelsey Mitchell; Sarah Orban	Women's team sprint	45.578	8 Q	Great Britain; L 46.816; 57.673	7	Poland; L 47.631; 56.686	8

Qualification legend: FA=Gold medal final; FB=Bronze medal final

Pursuit

Athlete	Event	Qualification		Semifinals		Final	
Athlete	Event	Time	Rank	Opponent Results	Rank	Opponent Results	Rank
Dylan Bibic; Michael Foley; Mathias Guillemette; Carson Mattern	Men's team pursuit	3:48.964	8 Q	France; 3:49.245	8	Belgium; 3:54.517	7
Erin Attwell; Ariane Bonhomme; Maggie Coles-Lyster; Sarah Van Dam	Women's team pursuit	4:12:205	8 Q	Germany; 4:10.471	8	Australia; 4:12.097	8

Keirin

Athlete	Event	Round 1	Repechage	Quarterfinals	Semifinals	Final
Athlete	Event	Rank	Rank	Rank	Rank	Rank
James Hedgcock	Men's keirin	5 R	1 Q	6	Did not advance	=16
Nick Wammes	Men's keirin	5 R	2 Q	6	Did not advance	=16
Lauriane Genest	Women's keirin	4 R	1 Q	6	Did not advance	=16
Kelsey Mitchell	Women's keirin	4 R	1 Q	6	Did not advance	=16

Omnium

Athlete	Event	Scratch race		Tempo race		Elimination race		Points race		Total	
Athlete	Event	Points	Rank	Points	Rank	Points	Rank	Points	Rank	Points	Rank
Dylan Bibic	Men's omnium	10	16	1	21	18	12	0	19	29	19
Maggie Coles-Lyster	Women's omnium	38	2	22	10	36	3	5	15	101	9

Madison

Athlete	Event	Points	Laps	Rank
Michael Foley; Mathias Guillemette	Men's madison	-40	DNF	=13
Ariane Bonhomme; Maggie Coles-Lyster	Women's madison	-40	DNF	15

=== Mountain biking ===
Canadian qualified two mountain bikers (one per gender) through the UCI Olympic mountain biking rankings on May 28, 2024. The team was officially named on June 25, 2024.

Athlete	Event	Time	Rank
Gunnar Holmgren	Men's cross-country	1:34:57	30
Isabella Holmgren	Women's cross-country	1:33:43	17

=== BMX ===
Canada qualified one male freestyle BMX cyclist. The quota spot was earned through the 2023 UCI BMX Freestyle World Championships. This will mark Canada's Olympic debut in the discipline.

Freestyle

Athlete	Event	Qualification						Final					
Athlete	Event	Run 1	Rank	Run 2	Rank	Average	Rank	Run 1	Rank	Run 2	Rank	Average	Rank
Jeffrey Whaley	Men's freestyle	76.20	11	80.83	10	78.51	10	Did not advance					10

Race

Canada qualified one female BMX racer through the final Olympic BMX ranking on June 4, 2024. On June 25, 2024, Molly Simpson was officially named to the team.

Athlete	Event	Quarterfinal		Semifinal		Final	
Athlete	Event	Points	Rank	Points	Rank	Time	Rank
Molly Simpson	Women's	7	4 Q	11	7 Q	35.833	5

== Diving ==
Canadian qualified five divers (two men and three women). Quota spots were earned through the 2023 FINA World Championships in Fukuoka, Japan; and 2024 World Aquatics Championships in Doha, Qatar. The final team was named on June 19, 2024. On July 4th, it was announced an additional spot in the Women's 10 metre platform event was reallocated to Kate Miller.

Athlete	Event	Preliminary		Semifinal		Final	
Athlete	Event	Points	Rank	Points	Rank	Points	Rank
Rylan Wiens	Men's 10 m platform	485.25	3 Q	468.40	5 Q	445.60	7
Nathan Zsombor-Murray	Men's 10 m platform	407.20	10 Q	410.80	10 Q	404.90	10
Rylan Wiens; Nathan Zsombor-Murray	Men's 10 m synchronized platform	—N/a				422.13	3rd place, bronze medalist(s)
Margo Erlam	Women's 3 m springboard	258.30	22	Did not advance			
Caeli McKay	Women's 10 m platform	324.90	3 Q	308.85	7 Q	364.50	4
Kate Miller	Women's 10 m platform	266.30	20	Did not advance			
Caeli McKay; Kate Miller	Women's 10 m synchronized platform	—N/a				299.22	4

== Equestrian ==
Canada qualified a full team of nine (three men and six women) equestrians (three per discipline). Canadian equestrians qualified a full team in dressage, eventing, and jumping through the 2023 Pan American Games in Santiago, Chile.

=== Dressage ===
The dressage team was officially named on July 5, 2024. On July 26, 2024, Jill Irving was replaced by Chris von Martels, due to fitness issues with the former's horse.

Athlete	Horse	Event	Grand Prix		Grand Prix Special		Grand Prix Freestyle		Overall	
Athlete	Horse	Event	Score	Rank	Score	Rank	Technical	Artistic	Score	Rank
Camille Carier Bergeron	Finnländerin	Individual	68.338	43	—N/a		Did not advance			43
Chris von Martels	Eclips	Individual	66.863	49	—N/a		Did not advance			49
Naïma Moreira-Laliberté	Statesman	Individual	68.711	41	—N/a		Did not advance			41
Camille Carier Bergeron; Chris von Martels; Naïma Moreira-Laliberté	See above	Team	203.912	11	Did not advance		—N/a		Did not advance	11

=== Eventing ===
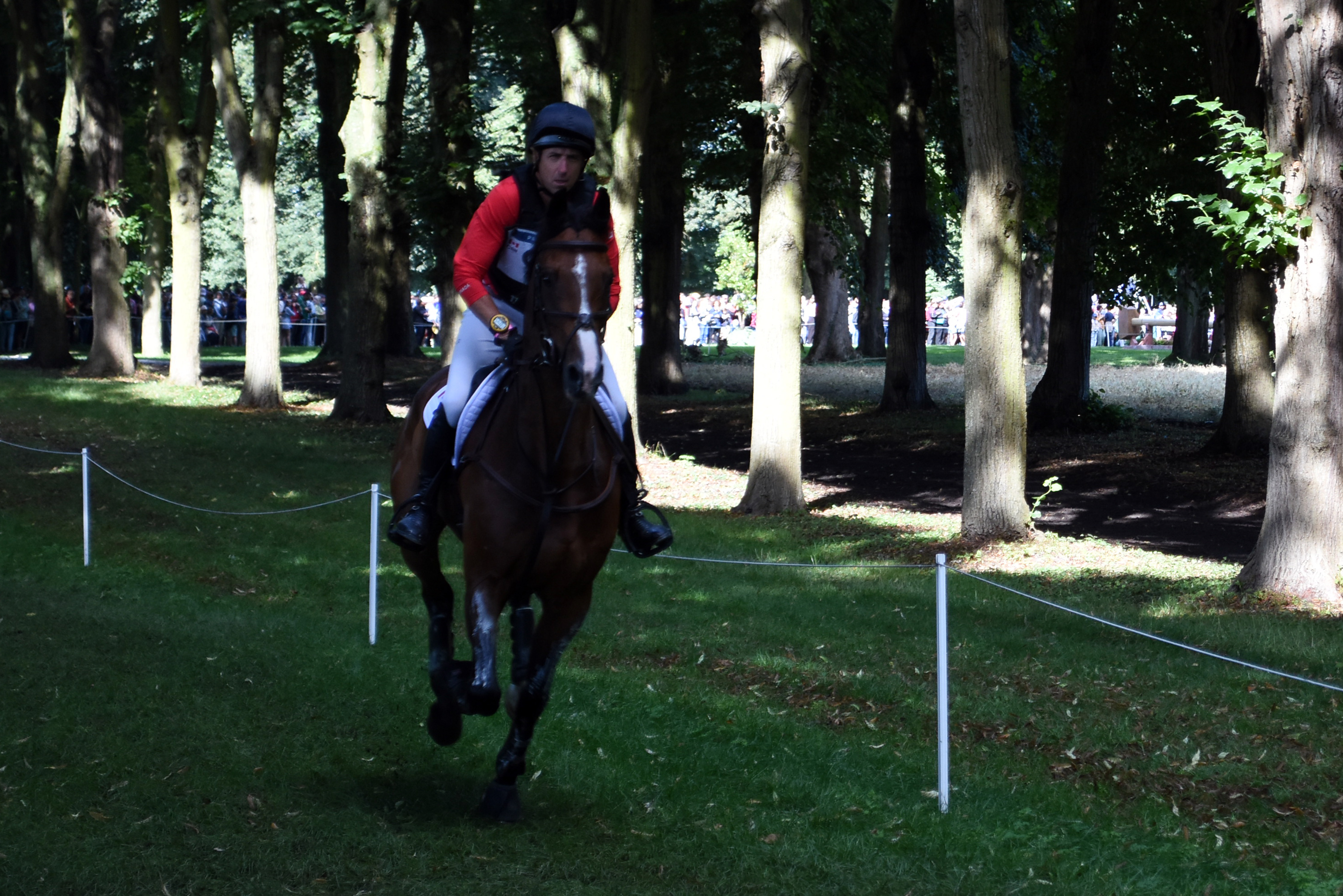
Mike Winter during the cross-country portion of the eventing competition

The dressage team was officially named on July 5, 2024.

Athlete	Horse	Event	Dressage		Cross-country			Jumping						Total	
Athlete	Horse	Event	Dressage		Cross-country			Qualifier			Final			Total	
Athlete	Horse	Event	Penalties	Rank	Penalties	Total	Rank	Penalties	Total	Rank	Penalties	Total	Rank	Penalties	Rank
Jessica Phoenix	Freedom GS	Individual	35.40	=43	32.40	67.80	49	0.00	67.80	38	Did not advance			67.80	38
Karl Slezak	Hot Bobo	Individual	35.80	=46	4.80	40.60	27	12.00	52.60	32	Did not advance			52.60	32
Mike Winter	El Mundo	Individual	35.20	42	14.40	49.60	38	44.00	53.60	35	Did not advance			53.60	35
Jessica Phoenix; Karl Slezak; Mike Winter	See above	Team	106.40	14	51.60	158.00	11	16.00	174.00	11	—N/a			174.00	11

=== Jumping ===
The jumping team of three equestrians (one man and two women) was named on June 26, 2024. On August 3, it was announced Amy Millar would be replaced by Tiffany Foster for the individual event.

Athlete	Horse	Event	Qualification		Final		
Athlete	Horse	Event	Penalties	Rank	Penalties	Time	Rank
Erynn Ballard	Nikka Vd Bisschop	Individual	4	37	Did not advance		37
Mario Deslauriers	Emerson	Individual	4	31	Did not advance		31
Tiffany Foster	Figor	Individual	8	50	Did not advance		50
Erynn Ballard; Mario Deslauriers; Amy Millar	See above	Team	32	14	Did not advance		14

== Fencing ==
Canada qualified 12 fencers (seven men and five women). The three teams: men's, women's foil and men's sabre teams, qualified as the highest ranked eligible Americas team, through the adjusted FIE Official Olympic rankings, and Pamela Brind'Amour qualified in the women's individual sabre as the highest ranked individual eligible from the Americas zone. Nicholas Zhang qualified by winning the Americas Zonal Qualifying Tournament in San Jose, Costa Rica. The official team was named on April 25, 2024. In May 2024, Ruien Xiao received a reallocated spot in the women's épée event, bringing the team up to 12 fencers. On July 28, 2024, Eleanor Harvey won the bronze medal in the women's individual foil event. This marked Canada's first ever Olympic medal in the sport of fencing.

Men

Athlete	Event	Round of 64	Round of 32	Round of 16	Quarterfinal	Semifinal	Final / BM	
Athlete	Event	Opposition Score	Opposition Score	Opposition Score	Opposition Score	Opposition Score	Opposition Score	Rank
Nicholas Zhang	Men's épée	Lugo (VEN); L 11–15	Did not advance					34
Blake Broszus	Men's foil	Schembri (ISV); W 15–8	Marini (ITA); L 9–15	Did not advance				30
Daniel Gu	Men's foil	Oliveira (CPV); W 15–9	Cheung (HKG); L 5–15	Did not advance				32
Maximilien Van Haaster	Men's foil	Bye	Bianchi (ITA); L 4–15	Did not advance				23
Blake Broszus; Daniel Gu; Maximilien Van Haaster; Bogdan Hamilton	Men's team foil	—N/a			Japan; L 26–45	Classification semifinal China; L 32–45	Seventh place final Egypt; W 45–38	7
Fares Arfa	Men's sabre	Bye	Szilágyi (HUN); W 15–8	Apithy (FRA); W 15–8	Oh (KOR); L 13–15	Did not advance		8
François Cauchon	Men's sabre	di Tella (ARG); L 13–15	Did not advance					34
Shaul Gordon	Men's sabre	Bye	Samele (ITA); L 10–15	Did not advance				29
Fares Arfa; François Cauchon; Shaul Gordon; Olivier Desrosiers	Men's team sabre	—N/a			South Korea; L 33–45	Classification semifinal Egypt; L 41–45	Seventh place final United States; L 43–45	8

- Both Hamilton and Desrosiers were named as alternates but contested their respective team events.

Women

Athlete	Event	Round of 64	Round of 32	Round of 16	Quarterfinal	Semifinal	Final / BM	
Athlete	Event	Opposition Score	Opposition Score	Opposition Score	Opposition Score	Opposition Score	Opposition Score	Rank
Ruien Xiao	Women's épée	Bye	Moellhausen (BRA); W 15–11	Kryvytska (UKR); L 14–15	Did not advance			14
Jessica Guo	Women's foil	Bye	Inostroza (CHI); W 15–7	Scruggs (USA); L 11–15	Did not advance			10
Eleanor Harvey	Women's foil	Bye	Yuting (CHN); W 12–8	Walczyk (POL); W 15–6	Favaretto (ITA); W 15–14	Scruggs (USA); L 9–15	Volpi (ITA); W 15–12	3rd place, bronze medalist(s)
Yunjia Zhang	Women's foil	Bye	Qingyuan (CHN); W 15–7	Pásztor (HUN); L 5–15	Did not advance			16
Jessica Guo; Eleanor Harvey; Yunjia Zhang	Women's team foil	—N/a			France; W 38–36	United States; L 31–45	Japan; L 32–33	4
Pamela Brind'Amour	Women's sabre	Bye	Gkountoura (GRE); L 3–15	Did not advance				28

== Football (soccer) ==
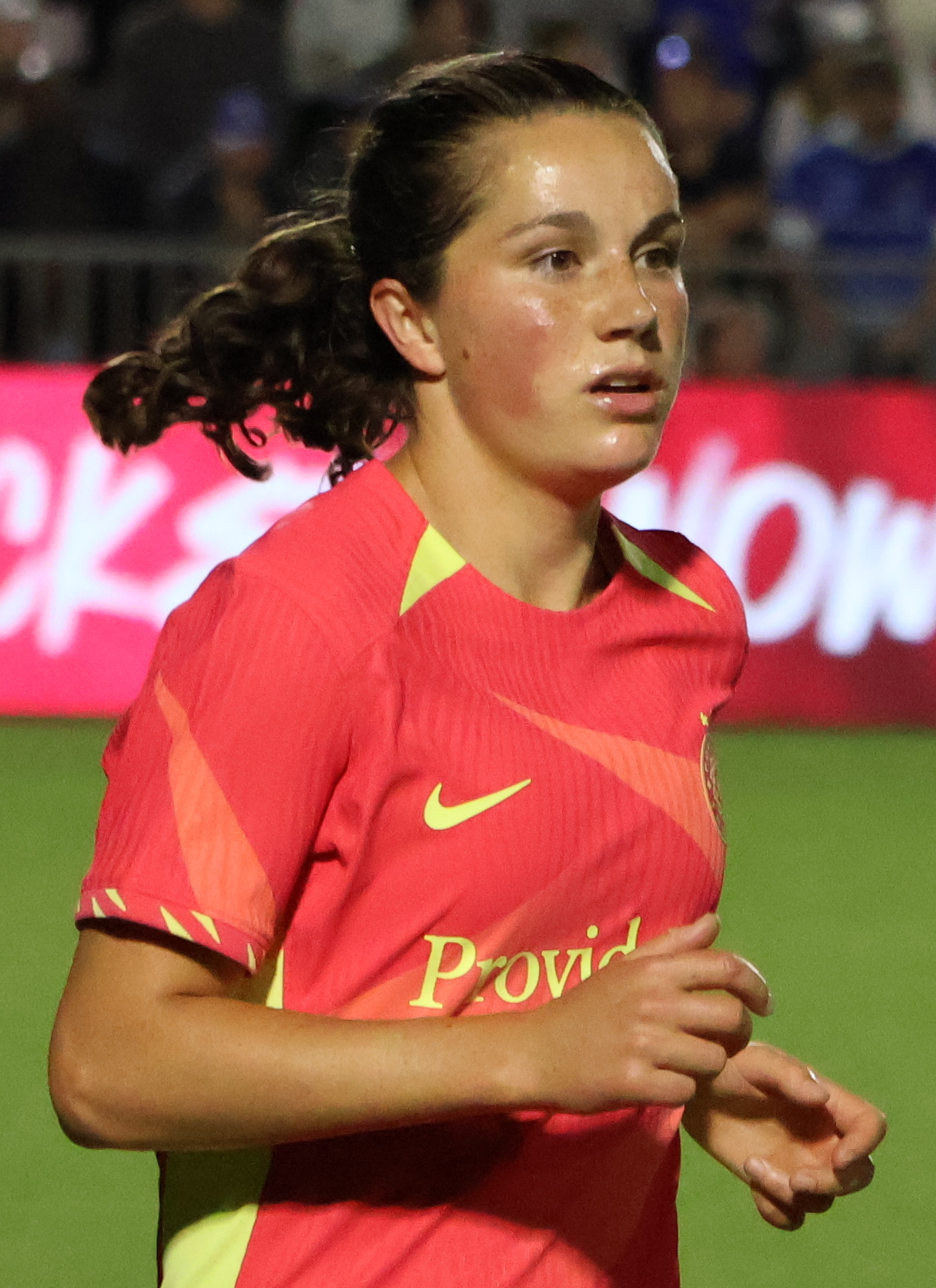
Jessie Fleming was the captain of the team

Canada qualified 18 athletes (all women) in the sport of soccer. The women's team qualified in September 2023.

Summary

Key:

- A.E.T. – After extra time
- P – Match decided by penalty shoot-out

Team	Event	Group stage				Quarterfinal	Semifinal	Final / BM	
Team	Event	Opposition Score	Opposition Score	Opposition Score	Rank	Opposition Score	Opposition Score	Opposition Score	Rank
Canada women's	Women's tournament	New Zealand; W 2–1	France; W 2–1	Colombia; W 1–0	2 Q	Germany; L 0–0 (a.e.t.) 2–4^{P}	Did not advance		7

=== Women's tournament ===
The Canada women's national soccer team qualified after defeating Jamaica in a two-legged CONCACAF play-off, in Kingston, Jamaica and Toronto, Canada.

Team roster

The final squad of 18 players was named on July 1, 2024. On July 20, 2024, Sydney Collins withdrew from the squad due to injury and was replaced by Gabrielle Carle. Acting head coach: (United Kingdom) Andy Spence

No.	Pos.	Player	Date of birth (age)	Caps	Goals	Club
1	GK	Kailen Sheridan	16 July 1995 (aged 29)	50	0	(United States Soccer Federation) San Diego Wave
2	DF	Gabrielle Carle	12 October 1998 (aged 25)	46	1	(United States Soccer Federation) Washington Spirit
3	DF	Kadeisha Buchanan	5 November 1995 (aged 28)	149	6	(The Football Association) Chelsea
4	FW	Evelyne Viens	6 February 1997 (aged 27)	31	5	(Italian Football Federation) Roma
5	MF	Quinn	11 August 1995 (aged 28)	100	6	(United States Soccer Federation) Seattle Reign
6	FW	Cloé Lacasse	7 July 1993 (aged 31)	36	5	(The Football Association) Arsenal
7	MF	Julia Grosso	29 August 2000 (aged 23)	63	3	(Italian Football Federation) Juventus
8	DF	Jayde Riviere	22 January 2001 (aged 23)	45	1	(The Football Association) Manchester United
9	FW	Jordyn Huitema	8 May 2001 (aged 23)	81	21	(United States Soccer Federation) Seattle Reign
10	DF	Ashley Lawrence	11 June 1995 (aged 29)	134	8	(The Football Association) Chelsea
11	FW	Adriana Leon	2 October 1992 (aged 31)	114	40	(The Football Association) Aston Villa
12	DF	Jade Rose	12 February 2003 (aged 21)	21	0	(United States Soccer Federation) Harvard Crimson
13	MF	Simi Awujo	23 September 2003 (aged 20)	17	1	(United States Soccer Federation) USC Trojans
14	DF	Vanessa Gilles	11 March 1996 (aged 28)	41	4	(French Football Federation) Lyon
15	FW	Nichelle Prince	19 February 1995 (aged 29)	97	16	(United States Soccer Federation) Kansas City Current
16	FW	Janine Beckie	20 August 1994 (aged 29)	105	36	(United States Soccer Federation) Portland Thorns
17	MF	Jessie Fleming (captain)	11 March 1998 (aged 26)	132	19	(United States Soccer Federation) Portland Thorns
18	GK	Sabrina D'Angelo	11 May 1993 (aged 31)	16	0	(The Football Association) Arsenal
20	DF	Shelina Zadorsky	24 October 1992 (aged 31)	100	6	(The Football Association) West Ham United

Group A

Pos	Team	Pld	W	D	L	GF	GA	GD	Pts	Qualification
1	France (H)	3	2	0	1	6	5	+1	6	Advance to knockout stage
2	Canada	3	3	0	0	5	2	+3	3 (Note: On 27 July 2024, Canada was penalized 6 points by FIFA for their coaching staff's involvement in illegal drone spying at an official training venue. The decision was upheld by CAS on 31 July.)	Advance to knockout stage
3	Colombia	3	1	0	2	4	4	0	3	Advance to knockout stage
4	New Zealand	3	0	0	3	2	6	−4	0	

Source: FIFA
Rules for classification: Group stage tiebreakers
(H) Hosts
Notes:
25 July 2024
17:00

Canada	2–1	New Zealand
Lacasse 45+4'; Viens 79'	Report	Barry 13'

Stade Geoffroy-Guichard, Saint-Étienne
Attendance: 2,674
Referee: Tess Olofsson (Sweden)

28 July 2024
21:00

France	1–2	Canada
Katoto 42'	Report	Fleming 58'; Gilles 90+12'

Stade Geoffroy-Guichard, Saint-Étienne
Attendance: 17,550
Referee: Bouchra Karboubi (Morocco)

31 July 2024
21:00

Colombia	0–1	Canada
	Report	Gilles 61'

Stade de Nice, Nice
Attendance: 5,388
Referee: Rebecca Welch (Great Britain)

Quarterfinals

3 August 2024
19:00

Canada	0–0 (a.e.t.)	Germany
	Report
Penalties
Quinn (penalty scored); Lawrence (penalty missed); Leon (penalty missed); Beckie (penalty scored)	2–4	(penalty scored) Gwinn; (penalty scored) Minge; (penalty missed) Lohmann; (penalty scored) Rauch; (penalty scored) Berger

Stade de Marseille, Marseille
Attendance: 12,517
Referee: Edina Alves Batista (Brazil)

== Golf ==
Canada qualified four golfers (two per gender). All four golfers qualified based on their positions on the respective men's and women's IGF Olympic rankings. On June 16, 2024 both male golfers were confirmed. Meanwhile, the women's team was named on June 24, 2024.

Athlete	Event	Round 1	Round 2	Round 3	Round 4	Total		
Athlete	Event	Score	Score	Score	Score	Score	Par	Rank
Corey Conners	Men's	68	69	69	66	272	−12	T9
Nick Taylor	Men's	70	73	68	69	280	−4	T30
Brooke Henderson	Women's	74	73	67	71	285	−3	T13
Alena Sharp	Women's	71	76	77	73	297	+9	T42

== Gymnastics ==
Canada qualified 11 gymnasts (five men and six women). Ten gymnasts (five per gender) competed in the artistic gymnastics events, while one female gymnast competed in trampoline.

=== Artistic ===
Canada qualified a two full teams of five artistic gymnasts. The women's team qualified after winning the bronze medal in the team all-around at the 2022 World Championships in Liverpool, Great Britain. The men's team qualified after finishing among the top nine not-yet-qualified nations at the 2023 World Championships in Antwerp, Belgium. This marked the first time since 2008 that the Canadian men qualified a full team. The final team was named on June 28, 2024. Ellie Black became the first Canadian artistic gymnast to compete at four Olympic Games.

Men

Team

Athlete	Event	Qualification								Final							
Athlete	Event	Apparatus						Total	Rank	Apparatus						Total	Rank
Athlete	Event	F	PH	R	V	PB	HB	Total	Rank	F	PH	R	V	PB	HB	Total	Rank
Zachary Clay	Team	—N/a	13.733	—N/a		~~12.900~~	—N/a			—N/a	14.133	—N/a				—N/a	
René Cournoyer	Team	13.333	13.033	13.933	13.766	14.333	12.400	80.798	26 Q	—N/a	10.566	12.866	14.400	14.266	13.600	—N/a	
Félix Dolci	Team	14.133	~~11.133~~	13.366	14.333	14.400	14.133	81.498	22 Q	13.966	—N/a	13.633	14.300	13.566	13.966	—N/a	
William Émard	Team	14.000	—N/a	14.400	14.266	—N/a	~~11.066~~	—N/a		13.833	—N/a	13.366	14.466	—N/a		—N/a	
Samuel Zakutney	Team	~~13.233~~	12.233	~~12.600~~	~~13.633~~	13.966	14.033	79.698	26 NR	13.400	13.266	—N/a		14.333	13.500	—N/a	
Total	Team	41.466	38.999	41.699	42.365	42.699	40.566	247.794	8 Q	41.199	37.965	39.865	43.166	42.165	41.066	245.426	8

Individual finals

Athlete	Event	Qualification								Final							
Athlete	Event	Apparatus						Total	Rank	Apparatus						Total	Rank
Athlete	Event	F	PH	R	V	PB	HB	Total	Rank	F	PH	R	V	PB	HB	Total	Rank
René Cournoyer	All-around	See team results above								13.600	13.100	13.700	13.733	14.300	13.300	81.733	17
Félix Dolci	All-around	See team results above								14.366	12.533	13.766	14.366	14.333	11.733	81.097	20

Women

Team

Athlete	Event	Qualification						Final					
Athlete	Event	Apparatus				Total	Rank	Apparatus				Total	Rank
Athlete	Event	V	UB	BB	F	Total	Rank	V	UB	BB	F	Total	Rank
Ellie Black	Team	14.000 Q	14.166	13.100	13.400	54.766	9 Q	14.166	12.800	14.300	13.633	—N/a	
Cassie Lee	Team	—N/a	12.166	13.466	12.366	—N/a		—N/a		13.333	12.600	—N/a	
Shallon Olsen	Team	14.166 Q	—N/a					14.400	—N/a			—N/a	
Ava Stewart	Team	13.600	13.466	12.633	12.633	52.332	26 Q	13.300	13.500	13.800	—N/a	—N/a	
Aurélie Tran	Team	13.166	13.5	12.066	13.066	51.798	29	—N/a	13.500	—N/a	13.100	—N/a	
Total	Team	42.133	41.132	39.199	39.099	161.563	6 Q	41.866	39.800	41.433	39.333	162.432	5

Individual finals

Athlete	Event	Qualification						Final					
Athlete	Event	Apparatus				Total	Rank	Apparatus				Total	Rank
Athlete	Event	V	UB	BB	F	Total	Rank	V	UB	BB	F	Total	Rank
Ellie Black	All-around	See team results above						14.100	14.066	12.933	13.700	54.799	6
Ava Stewart	All-around	See team results above						13.333	12.633	13.166	12.500	51.632	19
Ellie Black	Vault	14.000	—N/a			14.000	8 Q	13.933	—N/a			13.933	6
Shallon Olsen	Vault	14.166	—N/a			14.166	7 Q	13.366	—N/a			13.366	8

=== Trampoline ===
Canada qualified one female trampolinist through the 2023 World Championships in Birmingham, Great Britain. The final team was named on June 28, 2024.

Athlete	Event	Qualification		Final	
Athlete	Event	Score	Rank	Score	Rank
Sophiane Méthot	Women's	54.640	8	55.650	3rd place, bronze medalist(s)

== Judo ==
Canada qualified seven judokas (three males and four females). Five of the judoka qualified by being ranked in the top 17 spots of the IJF World Ranking List on June 25, 2024. Meanwhile, Kelly Deguchi earned a continental quota spot as the highest ranked Canadian judoka not already qualified. Finally, Ana Laura Portuondo Isasi earned a quota through a team invitation, and will also be allowed to start in her individual event. The final team was named on June 27, 2024. On July 29, 2024, Christa Deguchi became the first Canadian to win an Olympic gold medal in judo.

Athlete	Event	First round	Round of 32	Round of 16	Quarterfinals	Semifinals	Repechage	Final / BM	Rank
Athlete	Event	Opposition Result	Opposition Result	Opposition Result	Opposition Result	Opposition Result	Opposition Result	Opposition Result	Rank
Arthur Margelidon	Men's 73 kg	—N/a	Khojazoda (TJK); W 01–00	Wandtke (GER); W 10–00	Heydarov (AZE); L 00–10	Did not advance	Lombardo (ITA); L 00–10	Did not advance	=7
François Gauthier-Drapeau	Men's 81 kg	Bye	Fernando (POR); W 10–00	Gandía (PUR); W 10–00	Esposito (ITA); L 00–10	Did not advance	Casse (BEL); L 00–01	Did not advance	=7
Shady Elnahas	Men's 100 kg	—N/a	Bye	Eich (SUI); L 00–01	Did not advance				=9
Kelly Deguchi	Women's 52 kg	—N/a	Abe (JPN); L 00–11	Did not advance					=17
Christa Deguchi	Women's 57 kg	—N/a	Bye	Jiménez (PAN); W 10–00	Perišić (SRB); W 01–00	Cysique (FRA); W 10–00	Bye	Mi-mi (KOR); W 10–00	1st place, gold medalist(s)
Catherine Beauchemin-Pinard	Women's 63 kg	—N/a	Bye	Özbas (HUN); W 10–00	Leški (SLO); L 00–01	Did not advance	Fazliu (KOS); L 00–01	Did not advance	=7
Ana Laura Portuondo Isasi	Women's +78 kg	—N/a	Marenco (NCA); L 00–01	Did not advance					=17

Mixed

Athlete	Event	Round of 32	Round of 16	Quarterfinals	Semifinals	Repechage	Final / BM	
Athlete	Event	Opposition Result	Opposition Result	Opposition Result	Opposition Result	Opposition Result	Opposition Result	Rank
Arthur Margelidon; François Gauthier-Drapeau; Shady Elnahas; Kelly Deguchi; Christa Deguchi; Catherine Beauchemin-Pinard; Ana Laura Portuondo Isasi	Team	Bye	Uzbekistan; L 0–4	Did not advance				=9

== Rowing ==
Canada qualified two boats and 11 rowers (women's lightweight double sculls and eight) through the 2023 World Rowing Championships in Belgrade, Serbia. The final team was named on June 20, 2024.

Women

Athlete	Event	Heats		Repechage		Semifinals		Final	
Athlete	Event	Time	Rank	Time	Rank	Time	Rank	Time	Rank
Jennifer Casson; Jill Moffatt	Lightweight double sculls	7:09.45	3 R	7:16.81	2 SF	7:13.36	5 FB	7:04.82	8
Abigail Dent; Caileigh Filmer; Kasia Gruchalla-Wesierski; Maya Meschkuleit; Sydney Payne; Jessica Sevick; Kristina Walker; Avalon Wasteneys; Kristen Kit c	Eight	6:21.31	3 R	6:04.81	2 FA	—N/a		5:58.84	2nd place, silver medalist(s)

== Rugby sevens ==
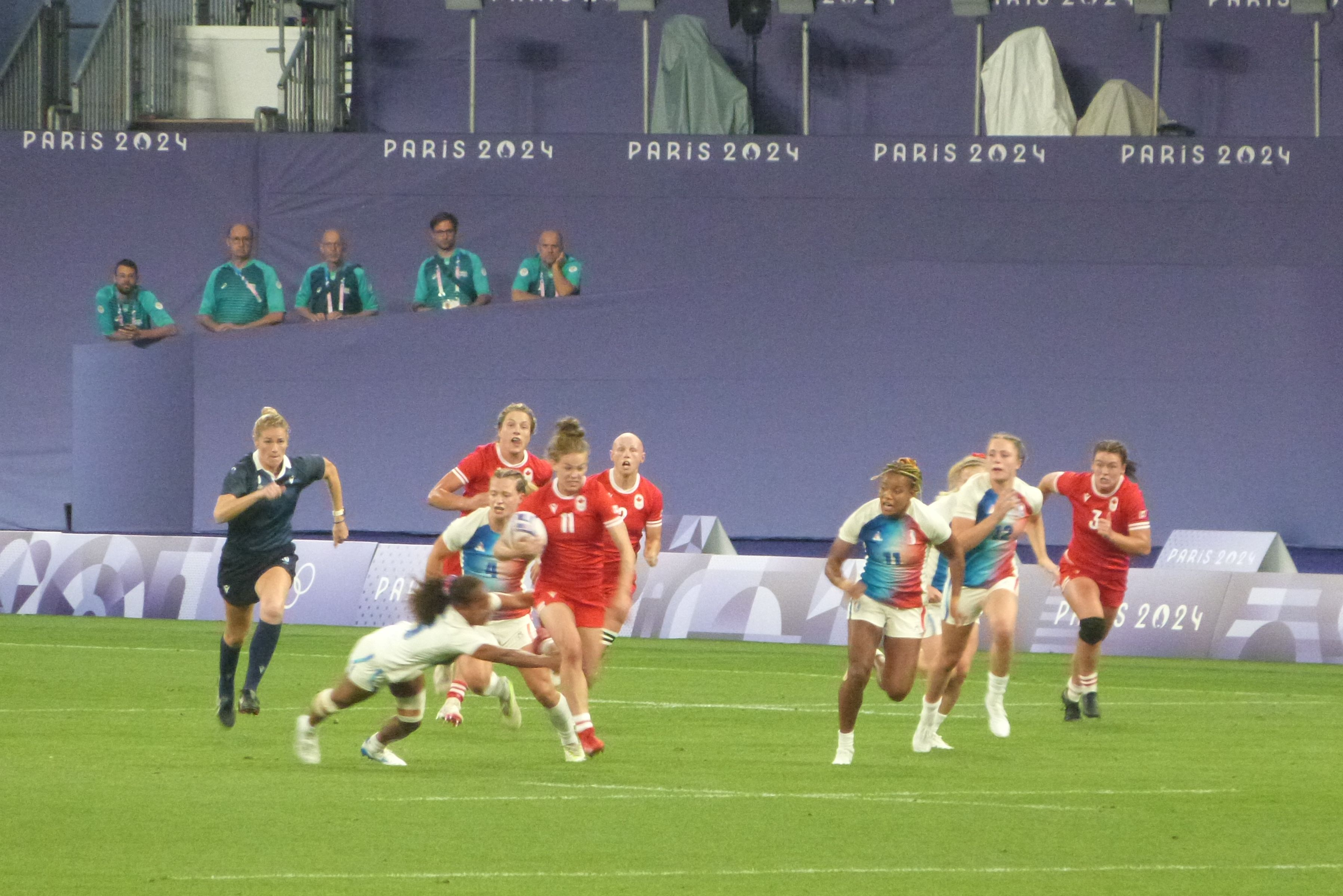
Canada versus France during the quarterfinals

Canada qualified a women's rugby sevens team of 12 athletes.

Summary

Team	Event	Pool round				Quarterfinal	Semifinal	Final / BM	
Team	Event	Opposition Result	Opposition Result	Opposition Result	Rank	Opposition Result	Opposition Result	Opposition Result	Rank
Canada women's	Women's tournament	Fiji; W 17–14	New Zealand; L 7–33	China; W 26–17	2 Q	France; W 19–14	Australia; W 21–12	New Zealand; L 12–19	2nd place, silver medalist(s)

=== Women's tournament ===
Canada women's national rugby sevens team qualified by winning the 2023 RAN Women's Sevens tournament in Langford, British Columbia.

Squad

Canada's team of 12 athletes was named on July 10, 2024.

- Caroline Crossley
- Olivia Apps (c)
- Alysha Corrigan
- Asia Hogan-Rochester
- Chloe Daniels
- Charity Williams
- Florence Symonds
- Carissa Norsten
- Krissy Scurfield
- Fancy Bermudez
- Piper Logan
- Keyara Wardley

Group stage

Pos	Team	Pld	W	D	L	PF	PA	PD	Pts	Qualification
1	New Zealand	3	3	0	0	114	19	+95	9	Quarter-finals
2	Canada	3	2	0	1	50	64	−14	7	Quarter-finals
3	China	3	1	0	2	62	81	−19	5	Quarter-finals
4	Fiji	3	0	0	3	33	95	−62	3	

Source: World Rugby
Rules for classification: 1) Points; 2) Head-to-head result; 3) Point difference; 4) Points scored.

28 July 2024
17:30

Fiji	14–17	Canada
Try: Rokotuisiga 9' c Likuceva 15' c Con: Naimasi (1/1) 9'; Ulunisau (1/1) 15'	World Rugby	Try: Symonds 4' c Williams 6' m Wardley 12' m Con: Daniels (1/3) 5'

Stade de France, Paris
Referee: Craig Chan (Hong Kong)

28 July 2024
21:30

New Zealand	33–7	Canada
Try: Miller (2) 2' c, 7' c Pouri-Lane 5' c Felix-Hotham 10' c Woodman-Wickliffe 13' c Con: King (3/4) 3', 8', 10'; Nuku (1/1) 13'	World Rugby	Try: Williams 4' c Con: Hogan-Rochester (1/1) 4'

Stade de France, Paris
Referee: George Selwood (England/Great Britain)

29 July 2024
16:00

Canada	26–17	China
Try: Williams (2) 5' c, 11' c Symonds 8' m Logan 14' m Con: Apps (1/1) 6'; Daniels (2/3) 8', 11'	World Rugby	Try: Chen 3' c Liu 8' m Wang 17' m Con: Chen (1/2) 4'

Stade de France, Paris
Referee: Finlay Brown (Scotland/Great Britain)

Quarterfinals

29 July 2024
22:00

France	14–19	Canada
Try: Jason 8' c Yengo 8' c Con: Yengo (2/2) 8', 9'	World Rugby	Try: Logan (2) 4' c, 11' c Daniels 14' m Con: Daniels (1/2) 4'; Apps (1/1) 11'

Stade de France, Paris
Referee: Kat Roche (United States)

Semifinals

30 July 2024
16:00

Canada	21–12	Australia
Try: Williams 8' c Hogan-Rochester 10' c Logan 13' c Con: Apps (3/3) 8', 10', 13'	World Rugby	Try: M. Levi 1' c Paki 4' m Con: Hinds (1/2) 2'

Stade de France, Paris
Referee: George Selwood (England/Great Britain)

Gold medal match

30 July 2024
19:45

New Zealand	19–12	Canada
Try: Pouri-Lane 1' c Blyde 7' c Waaka 12' m Con: Pouri-Lane (1/1) 1' c Nathan-Wong (1/2) 7'	World Rugby	Try: Daniels 6' c Corrigan 7' m Con: Daniels (1/2) 6'

Stade de France, Paris
Referee: Kat Roche (United States)

== Sailing ==
Canada qualified six sailors (two men and four women). Canada secured boat quotas through the 2023 Sailing World Championships in The Hague, Netherlands and the 2023 Pan American Games in Santiago, Chile. Antonia Lewin-LaFrance and Georgia Lewin-LaFrance were nominated to the team after a top eight finish at the 2024 World Championships. Meanwhile Will Jones and Justin Barnes along with Sarah Douglas were nominated after the results of the 2024 Princess Sofia Trophy Regatta. The final sailor to qualify to the team was Emily Bugeja in the women's kiteboarding event. The final team was officially named on June 7, 2024.

Elimination events

Athlete	Event	Opening series																						Quarterfinal	Semifinal								Final							
Athlete	Event	1	2	3	4	5	6	7	8	9	10	11	12	13	14	15	16	17	18	19	20	Net points	Rank	Rank	1	2	3	4	5	6	Total	Rank	1	2	3	4	5	6	Total	Rank
Emily Bugeja	Women's Formula Kite	~~19~~	19	18	17	17	12	Cancelled										—N/a				83	18	Did not advance																

Qualification legend: QF - Qualify to quarterfinal; SF - Qualify to semifinal; F - Qualify to final

Medal race events

Athlete	Event	Race													Net points	Final rank
Athlete	Event	1	2	3	4	5	6	7	8	9	10	11	12	M*	Net points	Final rank
Will Jones; Justin Barnes	Men's 49er	14	13	20	18	12	8	15	4	20	14	7	17	EL	142	17
Sarah Douglas	ILCA 6	23	13	13	12	17	8	13	9	14	—N/a			3	105	8
Antonia Lewin-LaFrance; Georgia Lewin-LaFrance	Women's 49er FX	1	19	12	21	1	19	6	6	11	5	13	15	EL	107	11

Key: M - Medal race; EL - Eliminated, did not advance into the medal race

== Shooting ==
Canada qualified three sport shooters (two men and one woman). Two quota spots were earned at the 2023 Pan American Games in Santiago, Chile. The third quota spot was earned at the 2024 Shooting Championships of the Americas in Buenos Aires, Argentina. The team was officially named on May 31, 2024.

Athlete	Event	Qualification		Final	
Athlete	Event	Points	Rank	Points	Rank
Tye Ikeda	Men's 10 m air rifle	617.4	48	Did not advance	48
Tye Ikeda	Men's 50 m rifle 3 positions	575-26x	42	Did not advance	42
Michele Esercitato	Men's 10 m air pistol	575-13x	17	Did not advance	17
Shannon Westlake	Women's 50 m rifle 3 positions	567-16x	32	Did not advance	32

== Skateboarding ==
Canada qualified four skateboarders (three men and one woman). All four skateboarders qualified through their placements in the Olympic World Skateboarding Rankings as of June 23, 2024. The final team was named on June 26, 2024.

Athlete	Event	Qualification		Final	
Athlete	Event	Score	Rank	Score	Rank
Cordano Russell	Men's street	263.87	7 Q	211.80	7
Matt Berger	Men's street	230.44	11	Did not advance	11
Ryan Decenzo	Men's street	116.69	18	Did not advance	18
Fay De Fazio Ebert	Women's park	51.82	20	Did not advance	20

== Surfing ==
Canada qualified one female surfer. Sanoa Dempfle-Olin qualified as the highest ranked unqualified athlete at the 2023 Pan American Games in Santiago, Chile. This marked Canada's debut appearance in surfing at the Olympics. Dempfle-Olin was officially named to the team on May 13, 2024.

Athlete	Event	Round 1		Round 2	Round 3	Quarterfinal	Semifinal	Final / BM	
Athlete	Event	Score	Rank	Opposition Result	Opposition Result	Opposition Result	Opposition Result	Opposition Result	Rank
Sanoa Dempfle-Olin	Women's shortboard	4.83	3 Q	Hinckel (BRA); L 6.30–7.10	Did not advance				=17

== Swimming ==
Canada qualified 29 swimmers (12 men and 17 women). Emma Finlin qualified for the team in the open water event at the 2024 World Aquatics Championships. Finlin received an unused quota spot as the best ranked athlete not already qualified. Pool swimmers were selected to the team based on results at the 2024 Canadian Swimming Trials held in Toronto. The final team was announced by Swimming Canada at the conclusion of the trials on May 19, 2024.

Men

Athlete	Event	Heat		Semifinal		Final	
Athlete	Event	Time	Rank	Time	Rank	Time	Rank
Joshua Liendo	50 m freestyle	21.92	15 Q	21.69	9 q	21.58	4
Joshua Liendo	100 m freestyle	48.34	=10 Q	48.06	11	Did not advance	
Yuri Kisil	100 m freestyle	49.06	29	Did not advance			
Javier Acevedo	100 m backstroke	54.19	20	Did not advance			
Blake Tierney	100 m backstroke	53.89	15 Q	53.71	16	Did not advance	
Blake Tierney	200 m backstroke	1:58.39	19	Did not advance			
Joshua Liendo	100 m butterfly	50.55	2 Q	50.42	3 Q	49.99 NR	2nd place, silver medalist(s)
Ilya Kharun	100 m butterfly	50.71	5 Q	50.68	6 Q	50.45	3rd place, bronze medalist(s)
Ilya Kharun	200 m butterfly	1:54.06	2 Q	1:54.01	3 Q	1:52.80	3rd place, bronze medalist(s)
Finlay Knox	200 m individual medley	1:58.97	13 Q	1:57.76	8 Q	1:57.26	8
Tristan Jankovics	400 m individual medley	4:18.23	16	—N/a		Did not advance	
Javier Acevedo; Yuri Kisil; Finlay Knox; Joshua Liendo	4 × 100 m freestyle relay	3:12.77	3 Q	—N/a		3:12.18	6
Alex Axon; Jeremy Bagshaw; Patrick Hussey; Lorne Wigginton	4 × 200 m freestyle relay	7:12.07	14	—N/a		Did not advance	
Blake Tierney; Finlay Knox; Ilya Kharun; Joshua Liendo; Javier Acevedo^{[a]}	4 × 100 m medley relay	3:32.33	7 Q	—N/a		3:31.27	5

Women

Athlete	Event	Heat		Semifinal		Final	
Athlete	Event	Time	Rank	Time	Rank	Time	Rank
Taylor Ruck	50 m freestyle	24.57	=8 Q	24.72	13	Did not advance	
Maggie Mac Neil	100 m freestyle	54.16	16 Q	DNS			
Mary-Sophie Harvey	200 m freestyle	1:56.21	2 Q	1:56.37	8 Q	1:55.29	4
Summer McIntosh	400 m freestyle	4:02.65	4 Q	—N/a		3:58.37	2nd place, silver medalist(s)
Kylie Masse	100 m backstroke	59.06	4 Q	58.82	5 Q	58.29	4
Ingrid Wilm	100 m backstroke	1:00.06	12 Q	59.10	6 Q	59.25	6
Kylie Masse	200 m backstroke	2:08.54	2 Q	2:07.92	5 Q	2:05.57	3rd place, bronze medalist(s)
Regan Rathwell	200 m backstroke	2:12.21	22	Did not advance			
Sophie Angus	100 m breaststroke	1:06.93	18	Did not advance			
Sydney Pickrem	200 m breaststroke	2:25.45	13 Q	2:24.03	9	Did not advance	
Kelsey Wog	200 m breaststroke	2:25.11	12 Q	2:24.82	13	Did not advance	
Maggie Mac Neil	100 m butterfly	57.00	7 Q	56.55	3 Q	56.44	5
Rebecca Smith	100 m butterfly	58.85	24	Did not advance			
Summer McIntosh	200 m butterfly	2:07.70	6 Q	2:04.87	1 Q	2:03.03 OR	1st place, gold medalist(s)
Summer McIntosh	200 m individual medley	2:09.90	1 Q	2:08.30	2 Q	2:06.56 OR, NR	1st place, gold medalist(s)
Sydney Pickrem	200 m individual medley	2:10.63	4 Q	2:09.65	6 Q	2:09.74	6
Summer McIntosh	400 m individual medley	4:37.35	3 Q	—N/a		4:27.71	1st place, gold medalist(s)
Ella Jansen	400 m individual medley	4:42.06	11	—N/a		Did not advance	
Maggie Mac Neil; Summer McIntosh; Penny Oleksiak; Taylor Ruck; Brooklyn Douthwright^{[a]} Mary-Sophie Harvey^{[a]}	4 × 100 m freestyle relay	3:35.29	4 Q	—N/a		3:32.99	4
Julie Brousseau; Mary-Sophie Harvey; Summer McIntosh; Emma O'Croinin	4 × 200 m freestyle relay	7:53.03	6 Q	—N/a		7:46.05	4
Ingrid Wilm^{[a]} Sophie Angus; Mary-Sophie Harvey^{[a]} Penny Oleksiak^{[a]} Kylie Masse; Maggie Mac Neil; Summer McIntosh	4 × 100 m medley relay	3:56.10	2 Q	—N/a		3:53.91	4
Emma Finlin	10 km open water	—N/a				2:22:06.5	23

Mixed

Athlete	Event	Heat		Final	
Athlete	Event	Time	Rank	Time	Rank
Apollo Hess^{[a]} Finlay Knox; Joshua Liendo; Maggie Mac Neil; Kylie Masse; Taylor Ruck^{[a]} Blake Tierney^{[a]}	4 × 100 m medley relay	3:43.87	6 Q	3:41.41	5

^{a} Swimmers who participated in the heats only.

== Table tennis ==
Canada qualified four table tennis athletes (three men and one woman). The men's team of three male athletes qualified by winning the silver medal at the 2023 Pan American Table Tennis Championship in Havana, Cuba. The men's team was finalized on March 31, 2024. Meanwhile, Mo Zhang qualified for her fifth Olympics at the 2024 Pan American Qualification Tournament in Lima, Peru. The final team was named on June 17, 2024.

Athlete	Event	Preliminaries	Round of 64	Round of 32	Round of 16	Quarterfinals	Semifinals	Final / BM	
Athlete	Event	Opposition Result	Opposition Result	Opposition Result	Opposition Result	Opposition Result	Opposition Result	Opposition Result	Rank
Edward Ly	Men's singles	Bye	Gionis (GRE); L 0–4 (6–11, 8–11, 8–11, 4–11)	Did not advance					=33
Eugene Wang	Men's singles	Bye	Togami (JPN); L 0–4 (3–11, 6–11, 7–11, 11–13)	Did not advance					=33
Jeremy Hazin; Edward Ly; Eugene Wang	Men's team	—N/a			Germany; L 0–3	Did not advance			=9
Mo Zhang	Women's singles	Bye	Vega (CHI); W 4–0 (11–7, 11–5, 11–7, 11–8)	Yuan (FRA); L 1–4 (11–9, 6–11, 5–11, 4–11, 7–11)	Did not advance				=17

== Taekwondo ==
Canada qualified two female taekwondoists. Skylar Park qualified as the third ranked athlete in the World Taekwondo Olympic Rankings. Josipa Kafadar qualified with a top two finish at the 2024 Pan American Qualification Tournament in Santo Domingo, Dominican Republic. On April 23, 2024, the team became the first to be officially named.

Athlete	Event	Qualification	Round of 16	Quarterfinals	Semifinals	Repechage	Final / BM	
Athlete	Event	Opposition Result	Opposition Result	Opposition Result	Opposition Result	Opposition Result	Opposition Result	Rank
Josipa Kafadar	Women's 49 kg	Bye	Stojković (CRO); L 0–2 (0–0, 5–6)	Did not advance				=9
Skylar Park	Women's 57 kg	—N/a	Hronová (CZE); W 2–0 (6–2, 4–3)	Yu-Jin (KOR); L 0–2 (6–7, 5–9)	Did not advance	İlgün (TUR); W 2–0 (6–2, 3–2)	Aoun (LBN); W 2–0 (0–0, 4–2)	3rd place, bronze medalist(s)

== Tennis ==
Canada qualified five tennis athletes (two men and three women). The five athletes qualified through placements on the ATP/WTA singles and doubles rankings. Milos Raonic and Bianca Andreescu qualified using their protected rankings. The final team was named on June 27, 2024.

Athlete	Event	Round of 64	Round of 32	Round of 16	Quarterfinals	Semifinals	Final / BM	Rank
Athlete	Event	Opposition Score	Opposition Score	Opposition Score	Opposition Score	Opposition Score	Opposition Score	Rank
Félix Auger-Aliassime	Men's singles	Giron (USA); W 6–1, 6–4	Marterer (GER); W 6–0, 6–1	Medvedev (AIN); W 6–3, 7–6^{(7–5)}	Ruud (NOR); W 6–4, 6–7^{(8–10)}, 6–3	Alcaraz (ESP); L 1–6, 1–6	Musetti (ITA); L 4–6, 6–1, 3–6	4
Milos Raonic	Men's singles	Koepfer (GER); L 7–6^{(7–2)}, 6–7^{(5–7)}, 6–7^{(1–7)}	Did not advance					=33
Félix Auger-Aliassime; Milos Raonic	Men's doubles	—N/a	Fritz / Paul (USA); L 6–7^{(14–16)}, 4–6	Did not advance				=17
Bianca Andreescu	Women's singles	Tauson (DEN); W 6–2, 6–3	Vekić (CRO); L 3–6, 4–6	Did not advance				=17
Leylah Fernandez	Women's singles	Muchová (CZE); W 6–1, 4–6, 6–2	Bucșa (ESP); W 7–6^{(7–4)}, 6–3	Kerber (GER); L 4–6, 3–6	Did not advance			=9
Leylah Fernandez; Gabriela Dabrowski	Women's doubles	—N/a	Burel / Gracheva (FRA); W 6–1, 7–5	Andreeva / Shnaider (AIN); L 4–6, 0–6	Did not advance			=9
Félix Auger-Aliassime; Gabriela Dabrowski	Mixed doubles	—N/a		Salisbury / Watson (GBR); W 7–5, 4–6, [10–3]	Fritz / Gauff (USA); W 7–6^{(7–2)}, 3–6, [10–8]	Macháč / Siniaková (CZE); L 3–6, 3–6	Koolhof / Schuurs (NED); W 6–3, 7–6^{(7–2)}	3rd place, bronze medalist(s)

== Triathlon ==
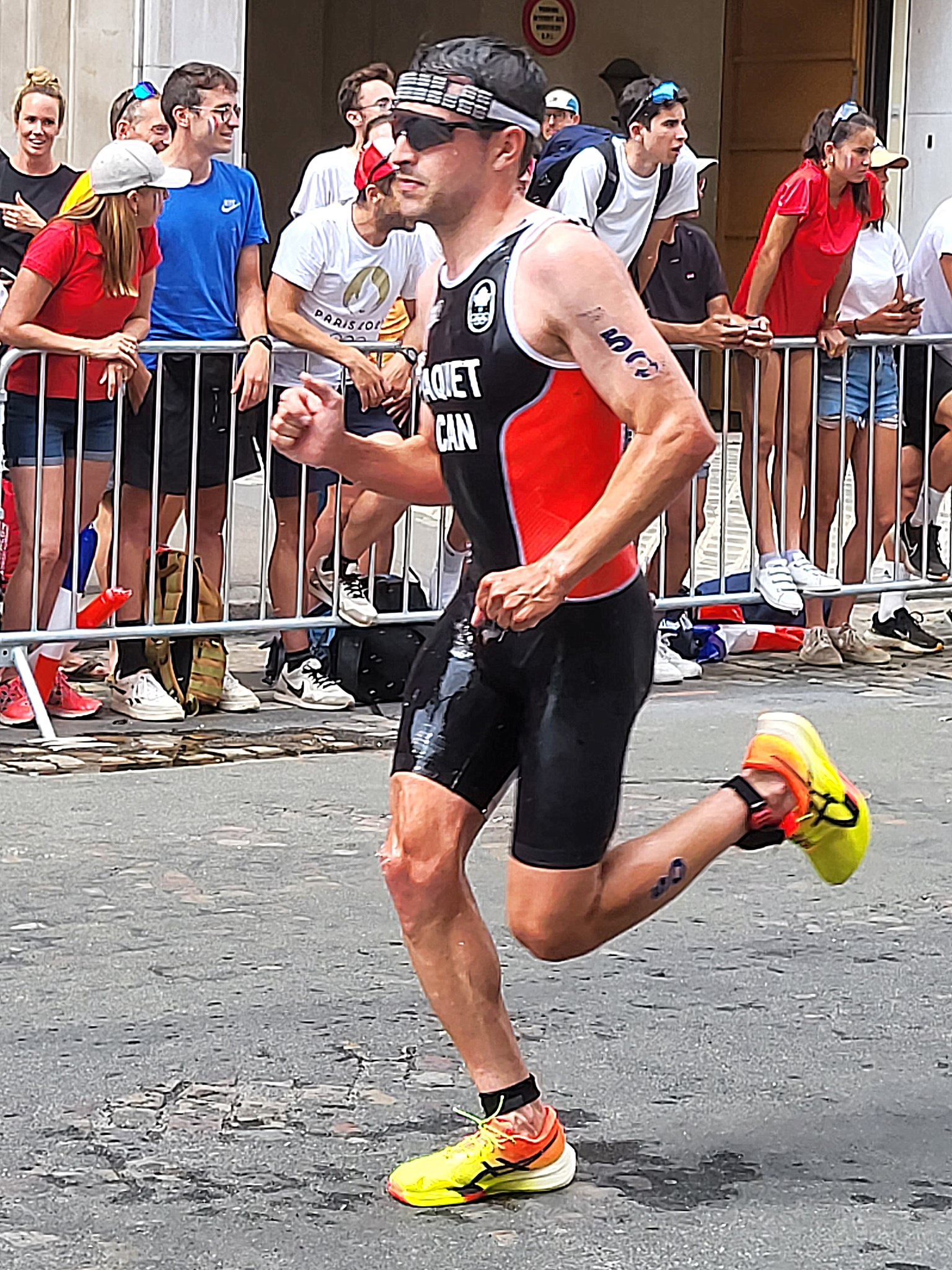
Charles Paquet during the men's race

Canada qualified three triathletes (two men and one woman) based on the ITU Olympic Rankings as of May 27, 2024. The final team was named on June 17, 2024.

Individual

Athlete	Event	Swim (1.5 km)	Trans 1	Bike (40 km)	Trans 2	Run (10 km)	Total	Rank
Tyler Mislawchuk	Men's	20:49	0:51	51:45	0:25	30:35	1:44:25	9
Charles Paquet	Men's	21:16	0:53	51:16	0:26	30:46	1:44:37	13
Emy Legault	Women's	24:04	0:56	1:00:40	0:32	35:42	2:01:54	35

== Volleyball ==
Canada qualified a total of 18 volleyball athletes (14 men and four women). The team consisted of a men's indoor team of 12 athletes and six volleyball athletes (two men and four women).

=== Beach ===
Canada qualified six beach volleyball athletes (two men and four women). Canadian qualified a women's pair based on the FIVB Beach Volleyball Olympic Rankings of June 9, 2024. The other two pairs qualified by winning the 2023–2024 NORCECA Continental Cup Final held in June 2024 in Tlaxcala, Mexico. The team was named on June 28, 2024.

Athletes	Event	Preliminary round				Lucky loser	Round of 16	Quarterfinal	Semifinal	Final / BM	
Athletes	Event	Opposition Score	Opposition Score	Opposition Score	Rank	Opposition Score	Opposition Score	Opposition Score	Opposition Score	Opposition Score	Rank
Daniel Dearing; Sam Schachter	Men's	Perušič / Schweiner (CZE); L 0–2 (17–21, 19–21)	Oliveira / Lanci (BRA); L 0–2 (13–21, 16–21)	Hörl / Horst (AUT); W 2–0 (21–16, 21–15)	3 q	Grimalt / Grimalt (CHI); L 0–2 (1–21, 0–21) INJ	Did not advance				=17
Melissa Humana-Paredes; Brandie Wilkerson	Women's	Poletti / Valiente (PAR); W 2–0 (21–16, 21–12)	Böbner / Vergé-Dépré (SUI); L 1–2 (18–21, 21–13, 11–15)	Graudiņa / Kravčenoka (LAT); L 0–2 (14–21, 20–22)	3 q	Hermannová / Štochlová (CZE); W 2–0 (21–15, 21–12)	Nuss / Kloth (USA); W 2–0 (21–19, 21–18)	Álvarez / Moreno (ESP); W 2–0 (21–18, 21–18)	Hüberli / Betschart (SUI); W 2–1 (14–21, 22–20, 15–12)	Ana Patrícia / Duda (BRA); L 1–2 (24–26, 21–12, 10–15)	2nd place, silver medalist(s)
Heather Bansley; Sophie Bukovec	Women's	Nuss / Kloth (USA); L 0–2 (17–21, 14–21)	Xue / Xia (CHN); L 0–2 (15–21, 19–21)	Mariafe / Clancy (AUS); L 0–2 (10–21, 16–21)	4	Did not advance					=19

=== Indoor ===
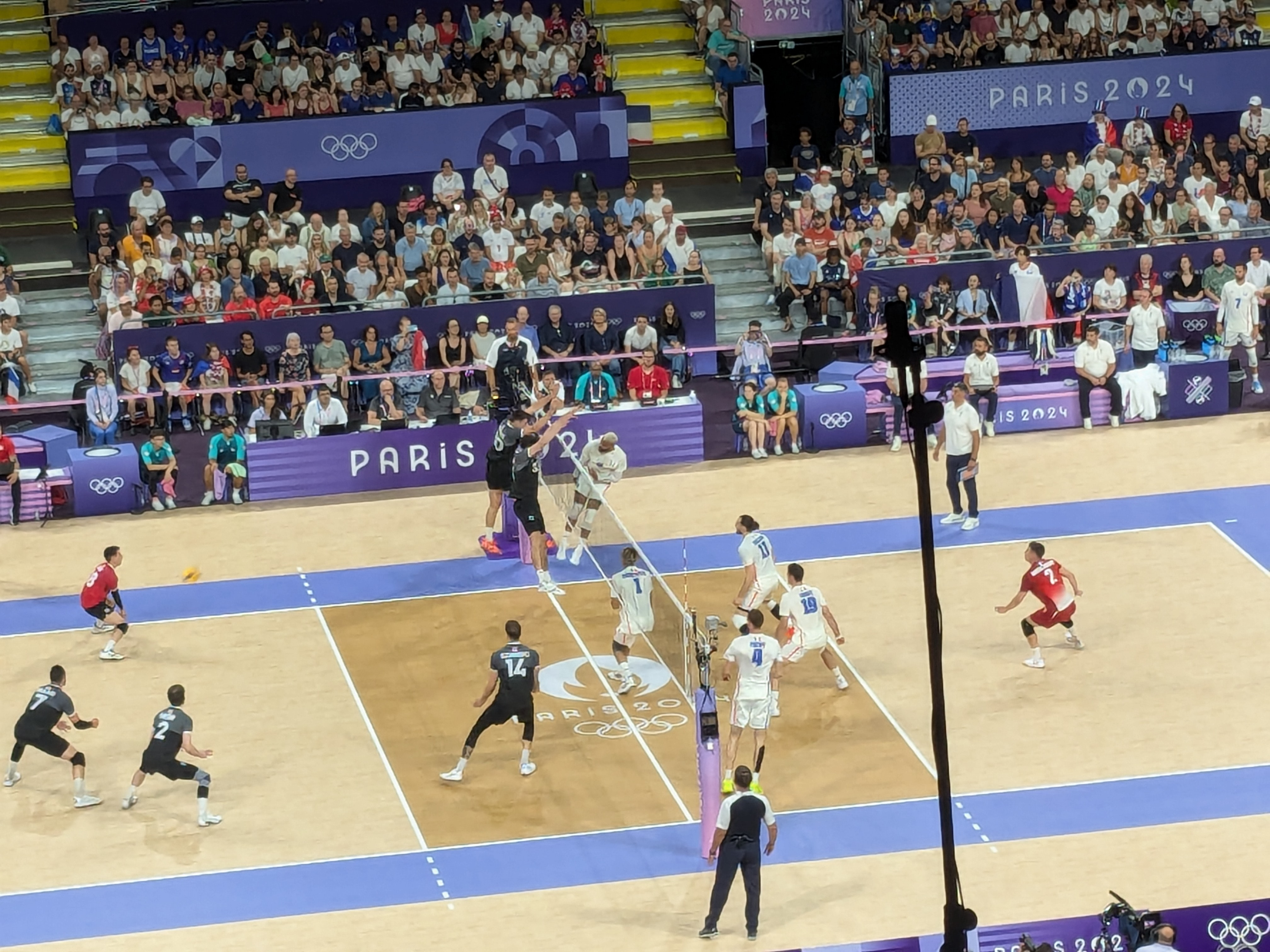
Canada versus France

Summary

Team	Event	Group stage				Quarterfinal	Semifinal	Final / BM	
Team	Event	Opposition Score	Opposition Score	Opposition Score	Rank	Opposition Score	Opposition Score	Opposition Score	Rank
Canada men's	Men's tournament	Slovenia; L 1–3	France; L 0–3	Serbia; L 2–3	4	Did not advance			10

==== Men's tournament ====
Canada men's volleyball team qualified by finishing in the top two at the 2023 Olympic Qualification Tournament in Xi'an, China.

Team roster

The roster of 12 athletes was announced on July 8, 2024.

Head coach: (Finland) Tuomas Sammelvuo

- 2 Luke Herr S
- 4 Nicholas Hoag (c) OH
- 5 Brodie Hofer OH
- 6 Danny Demyanenko MB
- 7 Stephen Maar OH
- 8 Brett Walsh S
- 11 Xander Ketrzynski OP
- 12 Lucas Van Berkel MB
- 14 Arthur Szwarc OP
- 18 Justin Lui L
- 33 Fynn McCarthy MB
- 80 Eric Loeppky OH

Group play

Pos	Team	Pld	W	L	Pts	SW	SL	SR	SPW	SPL	SPR	Qualification
1	Slovenia	3	3	0	8	9	3	3.000	282	252	1.119	Quarterfinals
2	France (H)	3	2	1	6	8	5	1.600	290	260	1.115	Quarterfinals
3	Serbia	3	1	2	3	5	8	0.625	256	293	0.874	
4	Canada	3	0	3	1	3	9	0.333	254	277	0.917	

Source: Olympics
Rules for classification: Tiebreakers
(H) Host

28 July 2024; 21:00	Slovenia	3–1	Canada	South Paris Arena 1, Paris; Attendance: 9,381; Referees: Wojciech Maroszek (POL), Wael Kandil (EGY)
28 July 2024; 21:00	(25–21, 25–20, 20–25, 25–21); P2 Report			South Paris Arena 1, Paris; Attendance: 9,381; Referees: Wojciech Maroszek (POL), Wael Kandil (EGY)

30 July 2024; 21:00	France	3–0	Canada	South Paris Arena 1, Paris; Attendance: 9,365; Referees: Ivaylo Ivanov (BUL), Epaminondas Gerothodoros (GRE)
30 July 2024; 21:00	(25–20, 25–21, 25–17); P2 Report			South Paris Arena 1, Paris; Attendance: 9,365; Referees: Ivaylo Ivanov (BUL), Epaminondas Gerothodoros (GRE)

3 August 2024; 21:00	Canada	2–3	Serbia	South Paris Arena 1, Paris; Attendance: 9,398; Referees: Stefano Cesare (ITA), Epaminondas Gerothodoros (GRE)
3 August 2024; 21:00	(25–16, 25–22, 24–26, 19–25, 16–18); P2 Report			South Paris Arena 1, Paris; Attendance: 9,398; Referees: Stefano Cesare (ITA), Epaminondas Gerothodoros (GRE)

== Water polo ==
Canada qualified a women's water polo team of 13 athletes.

Summary

Key:
- FT – After full time.
- P – Match decided by penalty-shootout.

Team	Event	Group stage					Quarterfinal	Classification	Seventh Place Match	
Team	Event	Opposition Score	Opposition Score	Opposition Score	Opposition Score	Rank	Opposition Score	Opposition Score	Opposition Score	Rank
Canada women's	Women's tournament	Hungary; L 7–12	China; W 12–7	Australia; L 7–10	Netherlands; L 11–20	4 Q	Spain; L 8–18	Italy; L 5–10	Greece; L 10–19	8

=== Women's tournament ===
After South Africa declined their continental quota, Canada women's national water polo team qualified as the highest-placing unqualified nation at the 2024 World Aquatics Championships in Doha, Qatar.

Team roster

The roster of 13 athletes was named on July 4, 2024.

Head coach: David Paradelo

- 1 Jessica Gaudreault GK
- 2 Rae Lekness CF
- 3 Axelle Crevier D
- 4 Emma Wright (c) D
- 5 Marilia Mimides D
- 6 Blaire McDowell D
- 7 Verica Bakoc D
- 8 Elyse Lemay-Lavoie CF
- 9 Hayley McKelvey D
- 10 Serena Browne CB
- 11 Kindred Paul CB
- 12 Shae La Roche D
- 13 Clara Vulpisi GK

Group play

Pos	Team	Pld	W	PSW	PSL	L	GF	GA	GD	Pts	Qualification
1	Australia	4	2	2	0	0	33	28	+5	10 (Note: Netherlands 14–15 Australia)	Quarterfinals
2	Netherlands	4	3	0	1	0	52	37	+15	10	Quarterfinals
3	Hungary	4	2	0	1	1	46	37	+9	7	Quarterfinals
4	Canada	4	1	0	0	3	37	49	−12	3	Quarterfinals
5	China	4	0	0	0	4	34	51	−17	0	

Source: Olympics
Rules for classification: 1) Points; 2) Head-to-head points; 3) Head-to-head goal difference; 4) Head-to-head goals scored; 5) Goal difference.
Notes:

29 July 2024; 20:05 v	Report	Hungary	12–7	Canada	Paris Aquatic Centre, Paris; Referees: Natalia Markopoulou (GRE), Marta Cabañas (ESP)
29 July 2024; 20:05 v	Report	Score by quarters: 4–1, 3–3, 1–1, 4–2			Paris Aquatic Centre, Paris; Referees: Natalia Markopoulou (GRE), Marta Cabañas (ESP)
29 July 2024; 20:05 v	Report	Gurisatti, Keszthelyi 3	Goals	three players 2	Paris Aquatic Centre, Paris; Referees: Natalia Markopoulou (GRE), Marta Cabañas (ESP)

31 July 2024; 15:35 v	Report	Canada	12–7	China	Paris Aquatic Centre, Paris; Referees: Boris Margeta (SLO), Frank Ohme (GER)
31 July 2024; 15:35 v	Report	Score by quarters: 4–0, 1–3, 4–1, 3–3			Paris Aquatic Centre, Paris; Referees: Boris Margeta (SLO), Frank Ohme (GER)
31 July 2024; 15:35 v	Report	four players 2	Goals	Deng 3	Paris Aquatic Centre, Paris; Referees: Boris Margeta (SLO), Frank Ohme (GER)

2 August 2024; 14:00 v	Report	Australia	10–7	Canada	Paris Aquatic Centre, Paris; Referees: Alessia Ferrari (ITA), Georgios Stavridis (GRE)
2 August 2024; 14:00 v	Report	Score by quarters: 1–1, 3–1, 5–2, 1–3			Paris Aquatic Centre, Paris; Referees: Alessia Ferrari (ITA), Georgios Stavridis (GRE)
2 August 2024; 14:00 v	Report	Halligan, Williams 3	Goals	Wright 3	Paris Aquatic Centre, Paris; Referees: Alessia Ferrari (ITA), Georgios Stavridis (GRE)

4 August 2024; 18:30 v	Report	Canada	11–20	Netherlands	Paris Aquatic Centre, Paris; Referees: Jennifer McCall (USA), Aurélie Blanchard (FRA)
4 August 2024; 18:30 v	Report	Score by quarters: 4–5, 2–6, 3–4, 2–5			Paris Aquatic Centre, Paris; Referees: Jennifer McCall (USA), Aurélie Blanchard (FRA)
4 August 2024; 18:30 v	Report	Bakoc 3	Goals	L. Rogge 5	Paris Aquatic Centre, Paris; Referees: Jennifer McCall (USA), Aurélie Blanchard (FRA)

Quarterfinal

6 August 2024; 14:00 v	Report	Canada	8–18	Spain	Paris La Défense Arena, Paris; Referees: Aurely Blanchard (FRA), Natalia Markopoulou (GRE)
6 August 2024; 14:00 v	Report	Score by quarters: 2–6, 2–4, 0–3, 4–5			Paris La Défense Arena, Paris; Referees: Aurely Blanchard (FRA), Natalia Markopoulou (GRE)
6 August 2024; 14:00 v	Report	Bakoc 5	Goals	Ruiz 4	Paris La Défense Arena, Paris; Referees: Aurely Blanchard (FRA), Natalia Markopoulou (GRE)

5–8th place semifinal

8 August 2024; 13:00 v	Report	Italy	10–5	Canada	Paris La Défense Arena, Paris; Referees: Jennifer McCall (USA), Chisato Kurosaki (JPN)
8 August 2024; 13:00 v	Report	Score by quarters: 1–1, 4–1, 1–3, 4–0			Paris La Défense Arena, Paris; Referees: Jennifer McCall (USA), Chisato Kurosaki (JPN)
8 August 2024; 13:00 v	Report	Bianconi, Marletta 2	Goals	five players 1	Paris La Défense Arena, Paris; Referees: Jennifer McCall (USA), Chisato Kurosaki (JPN)

Seventh place game

10 August 2024; 09:00 v	Report	Greece	19–10	Canada	Paris La Défense Arena, Paris; Referees: Aurélie Blanchard (FRA), Jennifer McCall (USA)
10 August 2024; 09:00 v	Report	Score by quarters: 2–2, 5–3, 5–2, 7–3			Paris La Défense Arena, Paris; Referees: Aurélie Blanchard (FRA), Jennifer McCall (USA)
10 August 2024; 09:00 v	Report	three players 3	Goals	Crevier 3	Paris La Défense Arena, Paris; Referees: Aurélie Blanchard (FRA), Jennifer McCall (USA)

== Weightlifting ==
Canada qualified two weightlifters (one per gender). Maude Charron qualified by placing in the top ten in the IWF Olympic Qualification Rankings, for the women's 59 kg event. Meanwhile, Boady Santavy received a reallocated quota spot in the men's 89 kg event. The final team was named on June 25, 2024.

Athlete	Event	Snatch		Clean & Jerk		Total	Rank
Athlete	Event	Result	Rank	Result	Rank	Total	Rank
Boady Santavy	Men's 89 kg	163	9	DNF	—N/a	DNF	—N/a
Maude Charron	Women's 59 kg	106	2	130	2	236	2nd place, silver medalist(s)

== Wrestling ==
Canada qualified six wrestlers (two men and four women). Five wrestlers qualified by finishing in the top two positions at the 2024 Pan American Qualification Tournament in Acapulco, Mexico. Linda Morais qualified by earning the last quota spot available at the 2024 World Wrestling Olympic Qualification Tournament in Istanbul, Turkey. The team was officially named on May 28, 2024.

Freestyle

Athlete	Event	Round of 16	Quarterfinal	Semifinal	Repechage	Final / BM	Rank
Athlete	Event	Opposition Result	Opposition Result	Opposition Result	Opposition Result	Opposition Result	Rank
Alex Moore	Men's 86 kg	Ramazanov (BUL); L 2–12	Did not advance		Shapiev (UZB); L 1–6	Did not advance	9
Amar Dhesi	Men's 125 kg	Zhiwei (CHN); W 2–1	Zare (IRI); L 0–10	Did not advance	Lazarev (KGZ); L 0–5	Did not advance	9
Hannah Taylor	Women's 57 kg	Sakurai (JPN); L 1–6	Did not advance		Valverde (ECU); W 13–0	Maroulis (USA); L 0–4	=5
Ana Godinez	Women's 62 kg	Douarre (FRA); W 5–2	Motoki (JPN); L 0–11	Did not advance	Incze (ROU); W 2–0	Bullen (NOR); L 0–11	=5
Linda Morais	Women's 68 kg	Oborududu (NGR); L 2–8	Did not advance				14
Justina Di Stasio	Women's 76 kg	Yiğit (TUR); L 2–8	Did not advance				12

== See also ==
- Canada at the 2022 Commonwealth Games
- Canada at the 2023 Pan American Games
- Canada at the 2024 Winter Youth Olympics
- Canada at the 2024 Summer Paralympics
