= Canoeing at the 2023 Pan American Games – Women's K-4 500 metres =

Women's K-4 500 metres at the 2023 Pan American Games
- Venue: Laguna Grande
- Dates: November 3
- Competitors: 24 from 6 nations
- Winning time: 1:34.73

Medalists
Gold medal	Karina Alanis; Brenda Gutiérrez; Beatriz Briones; Maricela Montemayor	Mexico
Silver medal	Courtney Stott; Natalie Davison; Riley Melanson; Toshka Besharah-Hrebacka	Canada
Bronze medal	Candelaria Sequeira; Lucía Dalto; Martina Isequilla; Sabrina Ameghino	Argentina

The women's K-4 500 metres competition of the canoeing events at the 2023 Pan American Games was held on November 3 at the Laguna Grande in San Pedro de la Paz, Chile.

== Schedule ==
Date	Time	Round
November 3, 2023	10:00	Final

== Results ==
The results were as follows:

Rank	Name	Nation	Time
1st place, gold medalist(s)	Karina Alanis; Brenda Gutiérrez; Beatriz Briones; Maricela Montemayor	Mexico	1:34.73
2nd place, silver medalist(s)	Courtney Stott; Natalie Davison; Riley Melanson; Toshka Besharah-Hrebacka	Canada	1:35.91
3rd place, bronze medalist(s)	Candelaria Sequeira; Lucía Dalto; Martina Isequilla; Sabrina Ameghino	Argentina	1:36.79
4	Madelen Heredia; Daylen Rodríguez; Yurieni Guerra; Camila Cuello	Cuba	1:36.97
5	Elena Wolgamot; Kali Wilding; Emma McDonald; Mehanaokalaikapomaikai Leafichild	United States	1:40.14
6	Maira Toro; Daniela Castillo; Ysumy Orellana; Fernanda Iracheta	Chile	1:41.93
