= Natalie Davison (canoeist) =

Canadian kayaker (born 1992)

Personal information
- Born: January 12, 1992 (age 34) Ottawa, Ontario, Canada
- Home town: Manotick, Ontario, Canada

Sport
- Sport: Canoeing
Medal record
Women's Canoeing
Representing Canada
Pan American Games
Silver medal – second place	2023 Santiago	K-4 500 metres

Natalie Davison (born January 12, 1992) is a Canadian sprint kayaker.

== Career ==
Davison first made the national team in 2017. In September 2023, was named to Canada's 2023 Pan American Games team. At the 2023 Pan American Games, Davison won silver as part of the Women's K-4 500 metres event. In June 2024, Davison was named to Canada's Olympic team.
