= List of ICF Canoe Sprint World Championships medalists in women's Canadian =

This is a list of medalists from the ICF Canoe Sprint World Championships in women's Canoe.

== C-1 200 m ==
Debuted: 2010.

Games	Gold	Silver	Bronze
2010 Poznań	Laurence Vincent-Lapointe; Canada	Li Tiantian; China	Maria Kazakova; Russia
2011 Szeged	Laurence Vincent-Lapointe; Canada	Maria Kazakova; Russia	Staniliya Stamenova; Bulgaria
2013 Duisburg	Laurence Vincent-Lapointe; Canada	Staniliya Stamenova; Bulgaria	Zsanett Lakatos; Hungary
2014 Moscow	Laurence Vincent-Lapointe; Canada	Staniliya Stamenova; Bulgaria	Valdenice Conceição; Brazil
2015 Milan	Staniliya Stamenova; Bulgaria	Kincső Takács; Hungary	Kamila Bobr; Belarus
2017 Račice	Laurence Vincent-Lapointe; Canada	Olesia Romasenko; Russia	Kincső Takács; Hungary
2018 Montemor-o-Velho	Laurence Vincent-Lapointe; Canada	Olesia Romasenko; Russia	Dorota Borowska; Poland
2018 Montemor-o-Velho	Laurence Vincent-Lapointe; Canada	Olesia Romasenko; Russia	Alena Nazdrova; Belarus
2019 Szeged	Nevin Harrison; United States	Olesia Romasenko; Russia	Alena Nazdrova; Belarus
2021 Copenhagen	Katie Vincent; Canada	Antía Jácome; Spain	Dorota Borowska; Poland
2022 Dartmouth	Nevin Harrison; United States	María Corbera; Spain	Lin Wenjun; China
2023 Duisburg	Yarisleidis Cirilo; Cuba	Antía Jácome; Spain	Lin Wenjun; China
2025 Milan	Liudmyla Luzan; Ukraine	Yarisleidis Cirilo; Cuba	Ekaterina Shliapnikova; Individual Neutral Athletes
2026 Poznán	Liudmyla Luzan; Ukraine	Sophia Jensen; Canada	Nevin Harrison; United States

== C-1 500 m ==
Debuted: 2018.

Games	Gold	Silver	Bronze
2018 Montemor-o-Velho	Kseniia Kurach; Russia	Alena Nazdrova; Belarus	Katie Vincent; Canada
2019 Szeged	Alena Nazdrova; Belarus	Kseniia Kurach; Russia	Anastasiia Chetverikova; Ukraine
2021 Copenhagen	María Mailliard; Chile	Liudmyla Luzan; Ukraine	Alena Nazdrova; Belarus
2022 Dartmouth	Liudmyla Luzan; Ukraine	Sophia Jensen; Canada	María Mailliard; Chile
2023 Duisburg	Katie Vincent; Canada	María Corbera; Spain	María Mailliard; Chile
2024 Samarkand	Liudmyla Luzan; Ukraine	María Mailliard; Chile	Mariya Brovkova; Kazakhstan
2025 Milan	Liudmyla Luzan; Ukraine	Katie Vincent; Canada	María Corbera; Spain
2026 Poznán	Sophia Jensen; Canada	Ágnes Kiss; Hungary	Alena Nazdrova (AIN-B)

== C-1 1000 m ==
Debuted: 2022.

Games	Gold	Silver	Bronze
2022 Dartmouth	Liudmyla Luzan; Ukraine	María Mailliard; Chile	Annika Loske; Germany
2023 Duisburg	María Mailliard; Chile	Jacy Grant; Canada	Li Li; China
2024 Samarkand	Alena Nazdrova; Individual Neutral Athletes	Giada Bragato; Hungary	Jiang Xina; China

== C-1 5000 m ==
Debuted: 2018.

Games	Gold	Silver	Bronze
2018 Montemor-o-Velho	Laurence Vincent-Lapointe; Canada	Annika Loske; Germany	María Mailliard; Chile
2019 Szeged	Volha Klimava; Belarus	María Mailliard; Chile	Zhang Yajue; China
2021 Copenhagen	Volha Klimava; Belarus	Zsófia Kisbán; Hungary	María Mailliard; Chile
2022 Dartmouth	Katie Vincent; Canada	Annika Loske; Germany	María Corbera; Spain
2023 Duisburg	Katie Vincent; Canada	Zsófia Kisbán; Hungary	Li Li; China
2024 Samarkand	María Mailliard; Chile	Annika Loske; Germany	Valeriia Tereta; Ukraine
2025 Milan	Volha Klimava; Individual Neutral Athletes	Katie Vincent; Canada	Zsófia Csorba; Hungary
2026 Poznán	Annika Loske; Germany	Zsófia Csorba; Hungary	Maryia Papichych; Individual Neutral Athletes

== C-2 200 m ==
Debuted: 2018.

Games	Gold	Silver	Bronze
2018 Montemor-o-Velho	Alena Nazdrova; Kamila Bobr; Belarus	Sylwia Szczerbińska; Dorota Borowska; Poland	Kseniia Kurach; Olesya Nikiforova; Russia
2019 Szeged	Lin Wenjun; Zhang Luqi; China	Kincső Takács; Virág Balla; Hungary	Dilnoza Rakhmatova; Nilufar Zokirova; Uzbekistan
2021 Copenhagen	Patricia Coco; María Corbera; Spain	Yarisleidis Cirilo Duboys; Katherin Nuevo; Cuba	Giada Bragato; Bianka Nagy; Hungary
2022 Dartmouth	Yarisleidis Cirilo; Katherin Nuevo; Cuba	Lin Wenjun; Shuai Changwen; China	Giada Bragato; Bianka Nagy; Hungary
2023 Duisburg	Shuai Changwen; Lin Wenjun; China	Antía Jácome; María Corbera; Spain	Lisa Jahn; Hedi Kliemke; Germany
2024 Samarkand	Yuliya Trushkina; Inna Nedelkina; AIN	Daniela Cociu; Maria Olărașu; Moldova	Xu Shengnan; Xiang Jingjing; China
2025 Milan	Liudmyla Luzan; Iryna Fedoriv; Ukraine	Yuliya Trushkina; Inna Nedelkina; AIN	Audrey Harper; Andreea Ghizila; United States
2026 Poznán	Yuliya Trushkina; Inna Nedelkina; AIN	Shokhsanam Sherzodova; Nilufar Zokirova; Uzbekistan	Shuai Changwen; Lin Wenjun; China

== C-2 500 m ==
Debuted: 2011.

Games	Gold	Silver	Bronze
2011 Szeged	Laurence Vincent-Lapointe; Mallorie Nicholson; Canada	Anastasia Ganina; Natalia Marasanova; Russia	Kincső Takács; Gyöngyvér Baravics; Hungary
2013 Duisburg	Laurence Vincent-Lapointe; Sara-Jane Caumartin; Canada	Zsanett Lakatos; Kincső Takács; Hungary	Nancy Millan; María Mailliard; Chile
2014 Moscow	Zsanett Lakatos; Kincső Takács; Hungary	Daryna Kastsiuchenka; Kamila Bobr; Belarus	Natalia Marasanova; Olesia Romasenko; Russia
2015 Milan	Daryna Kastsiuchenka; Kamila Bobr; Belarus	Maria Kazakova; Olesia Romasenko; Russia	Kincsö Takács; Zsanett Lakatos; Hungary
2017 Račice	Katie Vincent; Laurence Vincent-Lapointe; Canada	Irina Andreeva; Olesia Romasenko; Russia	Kamila Bobr; Alena Nazdrova; Belarus
2018 Montemor-o-Velho	Katie Vincent; Laurence Vincent-Lapointe; Canada	Virág Balla; Kincső Takács; Hungary	Nadzeya Makarchanka; Volha Klimava; Belarus
2019 Szeged	Sun Mengya; Xu Shixiao; China	Kincső Takács; Virág Balla; Hungary	Volha Klimava; Nadzeya Makarchanka; Belarus
2021 Copenhagen	Liudmyla Luzan; Anastasiia Chetverikova; Ukraine	Alena Nazdrova; Nadzeya Makarchanka; Belarus	Yarisleidis Cirilo Duboys; Katherin Nuevo; Cuba
2022 Dartmouth	Xu Shixiao; Sun Mengya; China	Liudmyla Luzan; Anastasiia Chetverikova; Ukraine	Giada Bragato; Bianka Nagy; Hungary
2023 Duisburg	Xu Shixiao; Sun Mengya; China	Antía Jácome; María Corbera; Spain	Sloan MacKenzie; Katie Vincent; Canada
2025 Milan	Liudmyla Luzan; Iryna Fedoriv; Ukraine	Zoe Wojtyk; Katie Vincent; Canada	Angels Moreno; Viktoriia Yarchevska; Spain
2026 Poznán	Carlotta Loske; Maike Jakob; Germany	Liudmyla Luzan; Anastasiia Rybachok; Ukraine	Anhelina Bardanouskaya; Inna Nedelkina; AIN-B

== C-4 500 m ==
Debuted: 2021.

Games	Gold	Silver	Bronze
2021 Copenhagen	Alena Nazdrova; Nadzeya Makarchanka; Aliaksandra Kalaur; Volha Klimava; Belarus	Virág Balla; Kincső Takács; Laura Gönczöl; Réka Opavszky; Hungary	Liudmyla Luzan; Olena Tsyhankova; Yuliia Kolesnyk; Anastasiia Chetverikova; Ukraine
2022 Dartmouth	Sophia Jensen; Sloan MacKenzie; Katie Vincent; Julia Osende; Canada	Sylwia Szczerbińska; Aleksandra Jacewicz; Katarzyna Szperkiewicz; Julia Walczak; Poland	Giada Bragato; Virág Balla; Kincső Takács; Bianka Nagy; Hungary
2023 Duisburg	Shuai Changwen; Lin Wenjun; Li Li; Wan Yin; China	Lisa Jahn; Hedi Kliemke; Annika Loske; Ophelia Preller; Germany	Sophia Jensen; Sloan MacKenzie; Jacy Grant; Julia Lilley; Canada
2025 Milan	Ágnes Kiss; Bianka Nagy; Réka Opavszky; Zsófia Csorba; Hungary	Viktoryia Nestsiarenka; Anhelina Bardanouskaya; Volha Klimava; Lizaveta Prymak; AIN	Jiang Xina; Teng Anshuo; Sun Mengya; Ma Yanan; China
2026 Poznán	Jiang Xina; Teng Anshuo; Sun Mengya; Ma Yanan; China	Ágnes Kiss; Bianka Nagy; Réka Opavszky; Zsófia Csorba; Hungary	Zoe Wojtyk; Élizabeth Desrosiers-McArthur; Sloan MacKenzie; Katie Vincent; Canada

== Mix C-2 200 m ==
Debuted: 2021

Games	Gold	Silver	Bronze
2021 Copenhagen	Irina Andreeva; Ivan Shtyl (RCF)	Michał Łubniewski; Dorota Borowska; Poland	Dávid Korisánszky; Kincső Takács; Hungary

== Mix C-2 500 m ==
Debuted: 2021

Games	Gold	Silver	Bronze
2022 Dartmouth	Connor Fitzpatrick; Katie Vincent; Canada	Sebastian Brendel; Sophie Koch; Germany	Aleksander Kitewski; Sylwia Szczerbińska; Poland
2023 Duisburg	Connor Fitzpatrick; Katie Vincent; Canada	Wiktor Głazunow; Sylwia Szczerbińska; Poland	Olympia Della Giustina; Daniele Santini; Italy
2024 Samarkand	Alexey Korovashkov; Ekaterina Shliapnikova; AIN	Kincső Takács; Jonatán Hajdu; Hungary	Uladzislau Paleshko; Inna Nedelkina; AIN

== Mix C-4 500 m ==
Debuted: 2024

Games	Gold	Silver	Bronze
2024 Samarkand	Sofiia Shtil; Ekaterina Shliapnikova; Zakhar Petrov; Ivan Shtyl; AIN	Anhelina Bardanouskaya; Uladzislau Paleshko; Vitali Asetski; Volha Klimava; AIN	Valéria Oliveira; Viktoriia Yarchevska; Manuel Fontán; Adrián Sieiro; Spain
