= ICF Canoe Sprint World Championships =

International event in canoe racing

- Status: active
- Genre: sporting event
- Date: mid-year
- Frequency: annual
- Country: varying
- Inaugurated: 1938

The ICF Canoe Sprint World Championships are an international event in canoe racing, one of two top-tier Summer Olympic sport events organized by the International Canoe Federation (the other being the ICF Canoe Slalom World Championships). They are usually held every non-Olympic year and have officially included paracanoe events since 2010; paracanoe-specific editions of this event (named ICF Paracanoe World Championships) are usually held in Summer Paralympic years.

Prior to November 2008, canoe sprint was known as flatwater racing.

== Explanation of events ==
Canoe sprint competitions are broken up into canoe (C), an open canoe with a single-blade paddle, or in kayaks (K), a closed canoe with a double-bladed paddle. Each canoe or kayak can hold one person (1), two people (2), or four people (4). For each of the specific canoes or kayaks, such as a K-1 (kayak single), the competition distances can be 200 metres (660 ft), 500 metres (1,600 ft), 1,000 metres (3,300 ft), or 5,000 metres (16,000 ft) long. When a competition is listed as a C-2 500 m event as an example, it means two people are in a canoe competing at a 500 metres (1,600 ft) distance.

Paracanoe competitions are contested in either a va'a (V), an outrigger canoe (which includes a second pontoon) with a single-blade paddle, or in a kayak (as above). All international competitions are held over 200 metres in single-man boats, with three event classes in both types of vessel for men and women depending on the level of an athlete's impairment. The lower the classification number, the more severe the impairment is – for example, VL1 is a va'a competition for those with particularly severe impairments.

== Editions ==
ICF Paracanoe World Championships (paracanoe events only)

- Events exclude exhibition events.

Edition	Year	Host City	Host Country	Events
1	1938	Vaxholm	Sweden	12
2	1948	London	Great Britain	5
3	1950	Copenhagen	Denmark	15
4	1954	Mâcon	France	15
5	1958	Prague	Czechoslovakia	15
6	1963	Jajce	Yugoslavia	16
7	1966	East Berlin	East Germany	16
8	1970	Copenhagen	Denmark	16
9	1971	Belgrade	Yugoslavia	18
10	1973	Tampere	Finland	18
11	1974	Mexico City	Mexico	18
12	1975	Belgrade	Yugoslavia	18
13	1977	Sofia	Bulgaria	18
14	1978	Belgrade	Yugoslavia	18
15	1979	Duisburg	West Germany	18
16	1981	Nottingham	Great Britain	18
17	1982	Belgrade	Yugoslavia	18
18	1983	Tampere	Finland	18
19	1985	Mechelen	Belgium	18
20	1986	Montréal	Canada	18
21	1987	Duisburg	West Germany	18
22	1989	Plovdiv	Bulgaria	22
23	1990	Poznań	Poland	22
24	1991	Paris	France	22
25	1993	Copenhagen	Denmark	22
26	1994	Mexico City	Mexico	24
27	1995	Duisburg	Germany	24
28	1997	Dartmouth	Canada	26
29	1998	Szeged	Hungary	26
30	1999	Milan	Italy	26
31	2001	Poznań	Poland	27
32	2002	Seville	Spain	27
33	2003	Gainesville	United States	27
34	2005	Zagreb	Croatia	27
35	2006	Szeged	Hungary	27
36	2007	Duisburg	Germany	27
37	2009	Dartmouth	Canada	27
38	2010	Poznań	Poland	28 + 7
39	2011	Szeged	Hungary	29 + 8
–	2012	Poznań	Poland	11
40	2013	Duisburg	Germany	29 + 12
41	2014	Moscow	Russia	29 + 12
42	2015	Milan	Italy	26 + 12
–	2016	Duisburg	Germany	12
43	2017	Račice	Czech Republic	27 + 12
44	2018	Montemor-o-Velho	Portugal	30 + 12
45	2019	Szeged	Hungary	30 + 12
–	~~2020~~	~~Duisburg~~	~~Germany~~	–
46	2021	Copenhagen	Denmark	28 + 12
47	2022	Dartmouth	Canada	30 + 12
48	2023	Duisburg	Germany	30 + 12
-	2024	Szeged	Hungary	12
49	2024	Samarkand	Uzbekistan	20
50	2025	Milan	Italy	24 + 12
51	2026	Poznań	Poland	24
52	2027	Szeged	Hungary	

=== Note ===
- The 2020 ICF Paracanoe World Championships were cancelled as a consequence of the COVID-19 pandemic.

== Events ==
Current program
Event	38	48	50	54	58	63	66	70	71	73	74	75	77	78	79	81	82	83	85	86	87	89	90	91	93	94	95	97	98	99	01	02	03	05	06	07	09	10	11	13	14	15	17	18	19	21	22	23	24	25	Total
Men's C-1 200 m																										•	•	•	•	•	•	•	•	•	•	•	•	•	•	•	•	•	•	•	•		•	•	•	•	24
Men's C-1 500 m									•	•	•	•	•	•	•	•	•	•	•	•	•	•	•	•	•	•	•	•	•	•	•	•	•	•	•	•	•	•	•	•	•	•	•	•	•	•	•	•	•	•	42
Men's C-1 1000 m	•		•	•	•	•	•	•	•	•	•	•	•	•	•	•	•	•	•	•	•	•	•	•	•	•	•	•	•	•	•	•	•	•	•	•	•	•	•	•	•	•	•	•	•	•	•	•		•	48
Men's C-1 5000 m																																						•	•	•	•	•	•	•	•	•	•	•	•	•	13
Men's C-2 500 m									•	•	•	•	•	•	•	•	•	•	•	•	•	•	•	•	•	•	•	•	•	•	•	•	•	•	•	•	•	•	•	•	•	•	•	•	•	•	•	•		•	41
Men's C-4 500 m																						•	•	•	•	•	•	•	•	•	•	•	•	•	•	•								•	•	•	•	•		•	21
Men's K-1 200 m																										•	•	•	•	•	•	•	•	•	•	•	•	•	•	•	•	•	•	•	•	•	•	•	•	•	25
Men's K-1 500 m		•	•	•	•	•	•	•	•	•	•	•	•	•	•	•	•	•	•	•	•	•	•	•	•	•	•	•	•	•	•	•	•	•	•	•	•	•	•	•	•	•	•	•	•	•	•	•	•	•	49
Men's K-1 1000 m	•		•	•	•	•	•	•	•	•	•	•	•	•	•	•	•	•	•	•	•	•	•	•	•	•	•	•	•	•	•	•	•	•	•	•	•	•	•	•	•	•	•	•	•	•	•	•		•	48
Men's K-1 5000 m																																						•	•	•	•	•	•	•	•	•	•	•	•	•	13
Men's K-2 500 m		•	•	•	•	•	•	•	•	•	•	•	•	•	•	•	•	•	•	•	•	•	•	•	•	•	•	•	•	•	•	•	•	•	•	•	•	•	•	•	•	•	•	•	•	•	•	•		•	48
Men's K-4 500 m													•	•	•	•	•	•	•	•	•	•	•	•	•	•	•	•	•	•	•	•	•	•	•	•							•	•	•	•	•	•		•	31
Women's C-1 200 m																																					*	•	•	•	•	•	•	•	•	•	•	•		•	12
Women's C-1 500 m																																					*							•	•	•	•	•	•	•	7
Women's C-1 5000 m																																												•	•	•	•	•	•	•	7
Women's C-2 200 m																																												•	•	•	•	•	•	•	7
Women's C-2 500 m																																						*	•	•	•	•	•	•	•	•	•	•		•	11
Women's C-4 500 m																																														•	•	•		•	4
Women's K-1 200 m																										•	•	•	•	•	•	•	•	•	•	•	•	•	•	•	•	•	•	•	•	•	•	•	•	•	25
Women's K-1 500 m			•	•	•	•	•	•	•	•	•	•	•	•	•	•	•	•	•	•	•	•	•	•	•	•	•	•	•	•	•	•	•	•	•	•	•	•	•	•	•	•	•	•	•	•	•	•		•	47
Women's K-1 1000 m																												•	•	•	•	•	•	•	•	•	•	•	•	•	•	•	•	•	•	•	•	•	•	•	23
Women's K-1 5000 m																						•	•	•	•													•	•	•	•	•	•	•	•	•	•	•	•	•	17
Women's K-2 500 m		•	•	•	•	•	•	•	•	•	•	•	•	•	•	•	•	•	•	•	•	•	•	•	•	•	•	•	•	•	•	•	•	•	•	•	•	•	•	•	•	•	•	•	•	•	•	•		•	48
Women's K-4 500 m						•	•	•	•	•	•	•	•	•	•	•	•	•	•	•	•	•	•	•	•	•	•	•	•	•	•	•	•	•	•	•	•	•	•	•	•	•	•	•	•	•	•	•		•	44
Past events
Event	38	48	50	54	58	63	66	70	71	73	74	75	77	78	79	81	82	83	85	86	87	89	90	91	93	94	95	97	98	99	01	02	03	05	06	07	09	10	11	13	14	15	17	18	19	21	22	23	24	25	Total
Men's C-1 10000 m			•	•	•	•	•	•	•	•	•	•	•	•	•	•	•	•	•	•	•	•	•	•	•																										23
Men's C-1 4 × 200 m relay																																					•	•	•	•	•										5
Men's C-2 200 m																										•	•	•	•	•	•	•	•	•	•	•	•	•	•	•	•	•	•	•	•						20
Men's C-2 1000 m	•		•	•	•	•	•	•	•	•	•	•	•	•	•	•	•	•	•	•	•	•	•	•	•	•	•	•	•	•	•	•	•	•	•	•	•	•	•	•	•	•	•	•	•	•	•	•	•		48
Men's C-2 10000 m	•		•	•	•	•	•	•	•	•	•	•	•	•	•	•	•	•	•	•	•	•	•	•	•																										24
Men's C-4 200 m																										•	•	•	•	•	•	•	•	•	•	•	•														12
Men's C-4 1000 m																						•	•	•	•	•	•	•	•	•	•	•	•	•	•	•	•	•	•	•	•	•	•								22
Men's K-1 10000 m	•		•	•	•	•	•	•	•	•	•	•	•	•	•	•	•	•	•	•	•	•	•	•	•																										24
Men's K-1 4 × 200 m relay																																					•	•	•	•	•										5
Men's K-1 4 × 500 m relay		•	•	•	•	•	•	•	•	•	•	•																																							11
Men's K-2 200 m																										•	•	•	•	•	•	•	•	•	•	•	•	•	•	•	•	•	•	•	•						21
Men's K-2 1000 m	•		•	•	•	•	•	•	•	•	•	•	•	•	•	•	•	•	•	•	•	•	•	•	•	•	•	•	•	•	•	•	•	•	•	•	•	•	•	•	•	•	•	•	•	•	•	•	•		48
Men's K-2 10000 m	•		•	•	•	•	•	•	•	•	•	•	•	•	•	•	•	•	•	•	•	•	•	•	•																										24
Men's K-4 200 m																										•	•	•	•	•	•	•	•	•	•	•	•														12
Men's K-4 1000 m	•	•	•	•	•	•	•	•	•	•	•	•	•	•	•	•	•	•	•	•	•	•	•	•	•	•	•	•	•	•	•	•	•	•	•	•	•	•	•	•	•	•	•	•	•						45
Men's K-4 10000 m			•	•	•	•	•	•	•	•	•	•	•	•	•	•	•	•	•	•	•	•	•	•	•																										23
Men's folding K-1 10000 m	•																																																		1
Men's folding K-2 10000 m	•																																																		1
Women's C-1 1000 m																																															•	•	•		3
Women's K-1 600 m	•																																																		1
Women's K-1 4 × 200 m relay																																					•	•	•	•	•										5
Women's K-2 200 m																										•	•	•	•	•	•	•	•	•	•	•	•	•	•	•	•	•	•	•	•	•	•	•	•		24
Women's K-2 600 m	•																																																		1
Women's K-2 1000 m																												•	•	•	•	•	•	•	•	•	•	•	•	•	•	•	•	•	•						18
Women's K-2 5000 m																						•	•	•	•																										4
Women's K-4 200 m																										•	•	•	•	•	•	•	•	•	•	•	•														12
Women's K-4 1000 m																															•	•	•	•	•	•															6
Mixed C-2 200 m																																														•					1
Mixed K-2 200 m																																														•					1
Mixed C-2 500 m																																															•	•	•		3
Mixed C-4 500 m																																																	•		1
Mixed K-2 500 m																																															•	•	•		3
Mixed K-4 500 m																																																	•		1
Total	12	5	15	15	15	16	16	16	18	18	18	18	18	18	18	18	18	18	18	18	18	22	22	22	22	24	24	26	26	26	27	27	27	27	27	27	27	28	29	29	29	26	27	30	30	28	30	30	20	24	

(*) Indicates exhibition events (not counted towards total)

== Editions Junior and U23 ==
- ICF Canoe Sprint Junior World Championships from 1985 to 2011
- ICF Canoe Sprint Junior and U23 World Championships from 2013

J (U20)	U23	Year	Host	Events
Junior
1	-	1985	Castel Gandolfo, Italy	
2	-	1987	(Socialist Federal Republic of Yugoslavia) Belgrade, Yugoslavia	
3	-	1989	Dartmouth, Canada	
4	-	1991	Vienna, Austria	
5	-	1993	Racice, Czech Republic	
6	-	1995	Yamanashi, Japan	
7	-	1997	Lahti, Finland	
8	-	1999	Zagreb, Croatia	
9	-	2001	Curitiba, Brazil	
10	-	2003	Komatsu, Japan	
11	-	2005	Szeged, Hungary	
12	-	2007	Racice, Czech Republic	
13	-	2009	Moscow, Russia	
14	-	2011	Brandenburg, Germany	23 + 0
Junior and U23
15	1	2013	Welland, Canada	14 + 14
16	2	2014	Szeged, Hungary	14 + 14
17	3	2015	Montemor-o-Velho, Portugal	16 + 16
18	4	2016	Minsk, Belarus	19 + 18
19	5	2017	Pitești, Romania	19 + 18
20	6	2018	Plovdiv, Bulgaria	19 + 18
21	7	2019	Pitești, Romania	18 + 18
-	-	2020	Brandenburg, Germany	Cancelled
22	8	2021	Montemor-o-Velho, Portugal	24 + 24
23	9	2022	Szeged, Hungary	26 + 26
24	10	2023	Auronzo, Italy	28 + 28
25	11	2024	Plovdiv, Bulgaria	24 + 24
26	12	2025	Montemor-o-Velho, Portugal	24 + 24

== Lists of medalists ==
- List of ICF Canoe Sprint World Championships medalists in men's Canadian
- List of ICF Canoe Sprint World Championships medalists in women's Canadian
- List of ICF Canoe Sprint World Championships medalists in men's kayak
- List of ICF Canoe Sprint World Championships medalists in women's kayak
- List of ICF Canoe Sprint World Championships medalists in paracanoe

== Medal tables ==
=== Canoe sprint (1938–2026) ===
This medal table does not include exhibition events. The historical medal count of the ICF Canoe Sprint World Championships as of the 2026 championships is as follows:

Rank	Nation	Gold	Silver	Bronze	Total
1	Hungary	240	185	161	586
2	Germany	146	114	92	352
3	Soviet Union	102	80	66	248
4	East Germany	73	36	36	145
5	Romania	54	78	68	200
6	Russia	54	55	49	158
7	Poland	41	95	83	219
8	Canada	41	28	29	98
9	Sweden	35	41	48	124
10	Belarus	32	35	38	105
11	Spain	27	42	53	122
12	New Zealand	23	12	6	41
13	Australia	21	27	21	69
14	Denmark	21	20	25	66
15	Ukraine	20	15	36	71
16	Italy	17	23	18	58
17	Czech Republic	16	34	25	75
18	Slovakia	16	10	12	38
19	West Germany	13	19	24	56
20	Norway	13	14	16	43
21	France	12	17	25	54
22	Portugal	12	14	10	36
23	China	11	13	17	41
24	Authorised Neutral Athletes (Note: Russia and Belarus were banned following the 2022 Russian invasion of Ukraine. Athletes from those countries not in support of their states' actions were permitted to compete as Authorised Neutral Athletes since 2023.)	11	7	7	25
25	Great Britain	10	16	17	43
26	Bulgaria	9	16	26	51
27	Czechoslovakia	9	15	21	45
28	Lithuania	9	7	11	27
29	Yugoslavia	8	8	5	21
30	Brazil	8	2	7	17
31	United States	7	5	5	17
32	Finland	7	3	3	13
33	Cuba	5	12	10	27
34	Austria	5	6	13	24
35	Azerbaijan	4	8	1	13
36	Uzbekistan	4	5	8	17
37	Serbia	3	7	13	23
38	Moldova	3	4	5	12
39	Chile	3	3	5	11
40	Russian Canoe Federation (Note: Russia was banned from the 2021 World Championships and their athletes' medals were assigned to the Russian Canoe Federation.)	3	0	5	8
41	Israel	2	1	2	5
42	Latvia	2	0	2	4
43	Belgium	1	3	4	8
44	AIN-A	1	1	1	3
45	AIN-B	1	0	4	5
46	Mexico	1	0	3	4
47	Serbia and Montenegro	1	0	0	1
48	Slovenia	0	4	5	9
49	Netherlands	0	4	4	8
50	Argentina	0	3	2	5
51	Georgia	0	2	3	5
51	South Africa	0	2	3	5
53	Ireland	0	1	2	3
54	Croatia	0	1	1	2
55	Greece	0	1	0	1
56	Kazakhstan	0	0	3	3
57	Iran	0	0	1	1
57	Japan	0	0	1	1
Totals (58 entries)		1,157	1,154	1,161	3,472

=== Paracanoe (2010–2024) ===
This medal table does not include exhibition events. Events were occasionally excluded from their respective medal tables due to lack of participation, but are included in this overall table. The historical medal count of the ICF Canoe Sprint World Championships as of the 2023 championships is as follows:

Rank	Nation	Gold	Silver	Bronze	Total
1	Great Britain	48	33	14	95
2	Brazil	21	17	18	56
3	Australia	21	7	11	39
4	Ukraine	16	8	12	36
5	Germany	8	9	7	24
6	Canada	6	10	6	22
7	Italy	6	7	10	23
8	Hungary	6	5	9	20
9	Austria	6	3	1	10
10	Spain	4	7	3	14
11	Romania	3	2	5	10
12	Russia	2	10	18	30
13	United States	2	6	6	14
14	Japan	2	2	3	7
15	Poland	1	8	7	16
16	Chile	1	4	7	12
17	French Polynesia	1	2	0	3
18	Uzbekistan	1	1	2	4
19	Russian Canoe Federation	1	1	0	2
20	China	1	0	0	1
20	Sweden	1	0	0	1
22	France	0	7	7	14
23	New Zealand	0	3	3	6
24	India	0	3	0	3
25	Portugal	0	1	2	3
26	Czech Republic	0	1	0	1
27	Iran	0	0	2	2
28	Algeria	0	0	1	1
28	Finland	0	0	1	1
Totals (29 entries)		158	157	155	470

https://www.canoeicf.com/paracanoe-world-championships/szeged-2024

== See also ==
- Canoe Sprint European Championships – International canoeing and kayaking event
- Canoe Sprint World Cup
- Canoeing at the Summer Olympics
- ICF Canoe Marathon World Championship
- ICF Canoe Slalom World Championships – International event in canoeing
- ICF Masters Canoe Slalom World Championships – International canoeing event
- ICF Masters Canoe Sprint World Championships
- International Canoe Federation – International canoeing governing body
- Paracanoe at the Summer Paralympics
- Wildwater Canoeing World Championships – International event in canoeing
