= 2019 ICF Canoe Sprint World Championships – Women's C-1 200 metres =

Women's C-1 200 metres at the 2019 ICF Canoe Sprint World Championships
- Venue: Olympic Centre of Szeged
- Location: Szeged, Hungary
- Dates: 22–24 August
- Competitors: 36 from 36 nations
- Winning time: 49.30

Medalists
gold medal	Nevin Harrison	United States
silver medal	Olesia Romasenko	Russia
bronze medal	Alena Nazdrova	Belarus

The women's C-1 200 metres competition at the 2019 ICF Canoe Sprint World Championships in Szeged took place at the Olympic Centre of Szeged.

== Schedule ==
The schedule was as follows:

Date	Time	Round
Thursday 22 August 2019	11:35	Heats
Friday 23 August 2019	16:53	Semifinals
Saturday 24 August 2019	09:20	Final B
Saturday 24 August 2019	11:49	Final A

All times are Central European Summer Time (UTC+2)

== Results ==
=== Heats ===
The six fastest boats in each heat, plus the three fastest seventh-place boats advanced to the semifinals.

==== Heat 1 ====
Rank	Canoeist	Country	Time	Notes
1	Katie Vincent	Canada	45.94	QS
2	Alena Nazdrova	Belarus	46.02	QS
3	Nevin Harrison	United States	46.11	QS
4	Staniliya Stamenova	Bulgaria	46.32	QS
5	María Corbera	Spain	47.75	QS
6	Anaïs Cattelet	France	49.43	QS
7	Ştefănica Ursu	Romania	50.09	qS
8	Oulimata Fall	Senegal	51.19	
9	Blessing Amusar	Nigeria	54.14	

==== Heat 2 ====
Rank	Canoeist	Country	Time	Notes
1	Zhang Luqi	China	45.23	QS
2	Bianka Nagy	Hungary	47.00	QS
3	Valdenice Conceição	Brazil	47.47	QS
4	Orasa Thiangkathok	Thailand	47.50	QS
5	Riska Andriyani	Indonesia	47.97	QS
6	Jana Ježová	Czech Republic	48.34	QS
7	Annika Loske	Germany	48.48	qS
8	Gulbakhor Fayzieva	Uzbekistan	49.29	
9	Clara Montesdeoca	Guatemala	51.99	

==== Heat 3 ====
Rank	Canoeist	Country	Time	Notes
1	Dorota Borowska	Poland	46.14	QS
2	María Mailliard	Chile	46.55	QS
3	Katie Reid	Great Britain	47.64	QS
4	Mariami Kerdikashvili	Georgia	48.29	QS
5	Vanesa Tot	Croatia	48.33	QS
6	Ko Haeng-bok	North Korea	48.37	QS
7	Namita Chandel	India	54.29	
8	Nedra Trabelsi	Tunisia	54.38	
9	Kim Yeo-jin	South Korea	55.61	

==== Heat 4 ====
Rank	Canoeist	Country	Time	Notes
1	Olesia Romasenko	Russia	45.31	QS
2	Anastasiia Chetverikova	Ukraine	46.37	QS
3	Teruko Kiriake	Japan	47.88	QS
4	Gabriela Ladičová	Slovakia	48.01	QS
5	Trương Thị Phượng	Vietnam	48.85	QS
6	Jūlija Gutova	Latvia	49.78	QS
7	Ruta Dagyte	Lithuania	50.29	qS
8	Law Ming Yu	Hong Kong	52.27	
–	Leong I Cheng	Macau	DNS	

=== Semifinals ===
Qualification in each semi was as follows:

The fastest three boats advanced to the A final.
The next three fastest boats advanced to the B final.

==== Semifinal 1 ====
Rank	Canoeist	Country	Time	Notes
1	Zhang Luqi	China	45.41	QA
2	Olesia Romasenko	Russia	45.72	QA
3	Alena Nazdrova	Belarus	46.13	QA
4	Katie Reid	Great Britain	47.46	QB
5	Jana Ježová	Czech Republic	47.63	QB
6	Mariami Kerdikashvili	Georgia	47.99	QB
7	Trương Thị Phượng	Vietnam	48.46	
8	Annika Loske	Germany	48.85	
9	Anaïs Cattelet	France	50.96	

==== Semifinal 2 ====
Rank	Canoeist	Country	Time	Notes
1	Dorota Borowska	Poland	45.02	QA
2	Nevin Harrison	United States	45.08	QA
3	Anastasiia Chetverikova	Ukraine	46.06	QA
4	Valdenice Conceição	Brazil	47.17	QB
5	Gabriela Ladičová	Slovakia	47.18	QB
6	María Corbera	Spain	47.44	QB
7	Orasa Thiangkathok	Thailand	47.52	
8	Ko Haeng-bok	North Korea	47.81	
9	Ştefănica Ursu	Romania	49.43	

==== Semifinal 3 ====
Rank	Canoeist	Country	Time	Notes
1	Katie Vincent	Canada	45.14	QA
2	María Mailliard	Chile	46.09	QA
3	Staniliya Stamenova	Bulgaria	46.77	QA
4	Teruko Kiriake	Japan	47.34	QB
5	Riska Andriyani	Indonesia	47.40	QB
6	Bianka Nagy	Hungary	47.43	QB
7	Vanesa Tot	Croatia	48.08	
8	Ruta Dagyte	Lithuania	48.73	
9	Jūlija Gutova	Latvia	50.76	

=== Finals ===
==== Final B ====
Competitors in this final raced for positions 10 to 18.

Rank	Canoeist	Country	Time
1	Bianka Nagy	Hungary	48.48
2	Katie Reid	Great Britain	48.74
3	Valdenice Conceição	Brazil	48.79
4	Gabriela Ladičová	Slovakia	48.81
5	María Corbera	Spain	49.09
6	Mariami Kerdikashvili	Georgia	49.20
7	Jana Ježová	Czech Republic	49.69
8	Teruko Kiriake	Japan	49.82
9	Riska Andriyani	Indonesia	50.30

==== Final A ====
Competitors raced for positions 1 to 9, with medals going to the top three.

Rank	Canoeist	Country	Time
1st place, gold medalist(s)	Nevin Harrison	United States	49.30
2nd place, silver medalist(s)	Olesia Romasenko	Russia	49.74
3rd place, bronze medalist(s)	Alena Nazdrova	Belarus	49.99
4	María Mailliard	Chile	50.09
5	Katie Vincent	Canada	50.12
6	Dorota Borowska	Poland	50.14
7	Anastasiia Chetverikova	Ukraine	50.15
8	Zhang Luqi	China	50.65
9	Staniliya Stamenova	Bulgaria	52.05
