= 2017 ICF Canoe Sprint World Championships – Women's C-1 200 metres =

Women's C-1 200 metres at the 2017 ICF Canoe Sprint World Championships
- Venue: Sportcentrum Račice
- Location: Račice, Czech Republic
- Dates: 25–27 August
- Competitors: 34 from 34 nations
- Winning time: 45.478 WB

Medalists
gold medal	Laurence Vincent-Lapointe	Canada
silver medal	Olesia Romasenko	Russia
bronze medal	Kincső Takács	Hungary

The women's C-1 200 metres competition at the 2017 ICF Canoe Sprint World Championships in Račice took place at the Sportcentrum Račice.

== Schedule ==
The schedule was as follows:

Date	Time	Round
Friday 25 August 2017	10:23	Heats
Saturday 26 August 2017	16:19	Semifinals
Sunday 27 August 2017	09:11	Final B
Sunday 27 August 2017	10:56	Final A

All times are Central European Summer Time (UTC+2)

== Results ==
=== Heats ===
The six fastest boats in each heat, plus the three fastest remaining boats advanced to the semifinals.

==== Heat 1 ====
Rank	Canoeist	Country	Time	Notes
1	Liudmyla Luzan	Ukraine	49.536	QS
2	Jana Ježová	Czech Republic	50.292	QS
3	Staniliya Stamenova	Bulgaria	50.375	QS
4	Orasa Thiangkathok	Thailand	51.658	QS
5	Anaïs Cattelet	France	51.753	QS
6	Thet Phyo Naing	Myanmar	53.986	QS
7	Beatriz Barros	Portugal	55.919	
8	Elizaveta Bukhantsova	Kyrgyzstan	1:12.992	

==== Heat 2 ====
Rank	Canoeist	Country	Time	Notes
1	Kincső Takács	Hungary	49.056	QS
2	Mariami Kerdikashvili	Georgia	50.812	QS
3	Vanesa Tot	Croatia	51.639	QS
4	Belén Ibarra	Ecuador	52.406	QS
5	Jūlija Gutova	Latvia	52.506	QS
6	Lim Yuan Yin	Singapore	53.228	QS
7	Maria Olărașu	Moldova	53.989	
8	Wu Ching-Ju	Chinese Taipei	55.051	
9	Namita Chandel	India	55.528	

==== Heat 3 ====
Rank	Canoeist	Country	Time	Notes
1	Alena Nazdrova	Belarus	48.175	QS
2	Dorota Borowska	Poland	49.753	QS
3	Li Qi	China	51.848	QS
4	Gabriela Ladičová	Slovakia	52.203	QS
5	Valdenice Conceição	Brazil	52.364	QS
6	Atena Raoufi Balgouri	Iran	52.748	QS
7	Ann Marie Armstrong	United States	53.025	qS
8	Angie Cardona	Colombia	54.020	
9	Sin Yi Louisa	Macau	55.998	

==== Heat 4 ====
Rank	Canoeist	Country	Time	Notes
1	Laurence Vincent-Lapointe	Canada	46.030	QS
2	Olesia Romasenko	Russia	46.869	QS
3	Katie Reid	Great Britain	50.336	QS
4	Adriana Paniagua	Spain	50.592	QS
5	Dayumin Dayumin	Indonesia	50.980	QS
6	Ophelia Preller	Germany	51.058	QS
7	Manaka Kubota	Japan	51.069	qS
8	Ruta Dagyte	Lithuania	51.092	qS

=== Semifinals ===
Qualification in each semi was as follows:

The fastest three boats advanced to the A final.
The next three fastest boats advanced to the B final.

==== Semifinal 1 ====
Rank	Canoeist	Country	Time	Notes
1	Laurence Vincent-Lapointe	Canada	45.787	QA
2	Kincső Takács	Hungary	47.837	QA
3	Jana Ježová	Czech Republic	49.021	QA
4	Dayumin Dayumin	Indonesia	50.054	QB
5	Manaka Kubota	Japan	50.165	QB
6	Gabriela Ladičová	Slovakia	51.349	QB
7	Li Qi	China	51.604	
8	Lim Yuan Yin	Singapore	52.521	
9	Thet Phyo Naing	Myanmar	52.904	

==== Semifinal 2 ====
Rank	Canoeist	Country	Time	Notes
1	Olesia Romasenko	Russia	47.147	QA
2	Alena Nazdrova	Belarus	47.919	QA
3	Adriana Paniagua	Spain	50.541	QA
4	Ruta Dagyte	Lithuania	50.813	QB
5	Staniliya Stamenova	Bulgaria	50.902	QB
6	Anaïs Cattelet	France	51.369	QB
7	Vanesa Tot	Croatia	52.147	
8	Belén Ibarra	Ecuador	52.208	
9	Atena Raoufi Balgouri	Iran	52.302	

==== Semifinal 3 ====
Rank	Canoeist	Country	Time	Notes
1	Dorota Borowska	Poland	48.505	QA
2	Valdenice Conceição	Brazil	48.594	QA
3	Liudmyla Luzan	Ukraine	48.766	QA
4	Katie Reid	Great Britain	49.183	QB
5	Ophelia Preller	Germany	50.483	QB
6	Orasa Thiangkathok	Thailand	50.538	QB
7	Mariami Kerdikashvili	Georgia	51.227	
8	Jūlija Gutova	Latvia	52.522	
9	Ann Marie Armstrong	United States	53.450	

=== Finals ===
==== Final B ====
Competitors in this final raced for positions 10 to 18.

Rank	Canoeist	Country	Time
1	Katie Reid	Great Britain	49.139
2	Manaka Kubota	Japan	50.217
3	Orasa Thiangkathok	Thailand	50.244
4	Ruta Dagyte	Lithuania	50.556
5	Staniliya Stamenova	Bulgaria	50.678
6	Ophelia Preller	Germany	50.733
7	Dayumin Dayumin	Indonesia	51.228
8	Anaïs Cattelet	France	51.378
9	Gabriela Ladičová	Slovakia	52.250

==== Final A ====
Competitors in this final raced for positions 1 to 9, with medals going to the top three.

Rank	Canoeist	Country	Time	Notes
1st place, gold medalist(s)	Laurence Vincent-Lapointe	Canada	45.478	WB
2nd place, silver medalist(s)	Olesia Romasenko	Russia	46.136	
3rd place, bronze medalist(s)	Kincső Takács	Hungary	47.178	
4	Alena Nazdrova	Belarus	47.362	
5	Dorota Borowska	Poland	47.809	
6	Valdenice Conceição	Brazil	48.494	
7	Liudmyla Luzan	Ukraine	48.736	
8	Jana Ježová	Czech Republic	49.157	
9	Adriana Paniagua	Spain	49.457	
