= 2018 ICF Canoe Sprint World Championships – Women's C-1 200 metres =

Women's C-1 200 metres at the 2018 ICF Canoe Sprint World Championships
- Venue: Centro de Alto Rendimento de Montemor-o-Velho
- Location: Montemor-o-Velho, Portugal
- Dates: 23–25 August
- Competitors: 29 from 29 nations
- Winning time: 45.567

Medalists
gold medal	Laurence Vincent-Lapointe	Canada
silver medal	Olesia Romasenko	Russia
bronze medal	Dorota Borowska	Poland
bronze medal	Alena Nazdrova	Belarus

The women's C-1 200 metres competition at the 2018 ICF Canoe Sprint World Championships in Montemor-o-Velho took place at the Centro de Alto Rendimento de Montemor-o-Velho.

== Schedule ==
The schedule was as follows:

Date	Time	Round
Thursday 23 August 2018	15:50	Heats
Saturday 25 August 2018	09:30	Semifinals
Saturday 25 August 2018	11:27	Final B
Saturday 25 August 2018	12:37	Final A

All times are Western European Summer Time (UTC+1)

== Results ==
=== Heats ===
The six fastest boats in each heat, plus the three fastest remaining boats advanced to the semifinals.

==== Heat 1 ====
Rank	Canoeist	Country	Time	Notes
1	Laurence Vincent-Lapointe	Canada	49.341	QS
2	Mariami Kerdikashvili	Georgia	52.887	QS
3	Gabriela Ladičová	Slovakia	53.727	QS
4	Josephine Bulmer	Australia	54.307	QS
5	Jana Ježová	Czech Republic	54.402	QS
6	Anggie Avegno	Ecuador	54.517	QS
7	Antía Jácome	Spain	54.737	qS
8	Ann Marie Armstrong	United States	55.652	qS

==== Heat 2 ====
Rank	Canoeist	Country	Time	Notes
1	Zhang Luqi	China	50.034	QS
2	Olesia Romasenko	Russia	50.694	QS
3	Liudmyla Luzan	Ukraine	52.804	QS
4	Eugénie Dorange	France	53.359	QS
5	Katie Reid	Great Britain	54.179	QS
6	Nikolina Mijušković	Serbia	55.945	QS
7	Daniela Cociu	Moldova	56.385	qS
8	Oulimata Fall	Senegal	1:00.570	

==== Heat 3 ====
Rank	Canoeist	Country	Time	Notes
1	Virág Balla	Hungary	51.424	QS
2	Lisa Jahn	Germany	52.644	QS
3	Valdenice Conceição	Brazil	54.420	QS
4	Vanesa Tot	Croatia	55.260	QS
5	Sayako Shimazu	Japan	57.195	QS
6	Law Ming	Hong Kong	58.460	QS
–	Ana Ochoa	Colombia	DNS	

==== Heat 4 ====
Rank	Canoeist	Country	Time	Notes
1	Dorota Borowska	Poland	49.221	QS
2	Staniliya Stamenova	Bulgaria	49.931	QS
3	Alena Nazdrova	Belarus	50.131	QS
4	Ruta Dagyte	Lithuania	53.716	QS
5	Jūlija Gutova	Latvia	56.146	QS
6	Márcia Faria	Portugal	57.706	QS

=== Semifinals ===
Qualification in each semi was as follows:

The fastest three boats advanced to the A final.
The next three fastest boats advanced to the B final.

==== Semifinal 1 ====
Rank	Canoeist	Country	Time	Notes
1	Dorota Borowska	Poland	46.837	QA
2	Zhang Luqi	China	48.117	QA
3	Nikolina Mijušković	Serbia	48.377	QA
4	Valdenice Conceição	Brazil	49.763	QB
5	Antía Jácome	Spain	50.483	QB
6	Anggie Avegno	Ecuador	50.693	QB
7	Mariami Kerdikashvili	Georgia	50.793	
8	Vanesa Tot	Croatia	51.858	
9	Jūlija Gutova	Latvia	52.058	

==== Semifinal 2 ====
Rank	Canoeist	Country	Time	Notes
1	Virág Balla	Hungary	48.200	QA
2	Staniliya Stamenova	Bulgaria	48.645	QA
3	Gabriela Ladičová	Slovakia	49.960	QA
4	Liudmyla Luzan	Ukraine	50.020	QB
5	Eugénie Dorange	France	50.170	QB
6	Jana Ježová	Czech Republic	50.385	QB
7	Ann Marie Armstrong	United States	51.225	
8	Ruta Dagyte	Lithuania	51.570	
9	Law Ming	Hong Kong	55.110	

==== Semifinal 3 ====
Rank	Canoeist	Country	Time	Notes
1	Laurence Vincent-Lapointe	Canada	46.423	QA
2	Olesia Romasenko	Russia	47.188	QA
3	Alena Nazdrova	Belarus	47.808	QA
4	Lisa Jahn	Germany	49.963	QB
5	Katie Reid	Great Britain	50.418	QB
6	Josephine Bulmer	Australia	50.963	QB
7	Sayako Shimazu	Japan	52.653	
8	Daniela Cociu	Moldova	54.029	
9	Márcia Faria	Portugal	55.289	

=== Finals ===
==== Final B ====
Competitors in this final raced for positions 10 to 18.

Rank	Canoeist	Country	Time
1	Lisa Jahn	Germany	47.818
2	Valdenice Conceição	Brazil	48.628
3	Antía Jácome	Spain	48.763
4	Eugénie Dorange	France	48.838
5	Anggie Avegno	Ecuador	48.873
6	Liudmyla Luzan	Ukraine	48.988
7	Katie Reid	Great Britain	49.368
8	Jana Ježová	Czech Republic	49.573
9	Josephine Bulmer	Australia	49.923

==== Final A ====
Competitors in this final raced for positions 1 to 9, with medals going to the top four as two boats were tied for third place.

Rank	Canoeist	Country	Time
1st place, gold medalist(s)	Laurence Vincent-Lapointe	Canada	45.567
2nd place, silver medalist(s)	Olesia Romasenko	Russia	46.242
3rd place, bronze medalist(s)	Dorota Borowska	Poland	46.812
3rd place, bronze medalist(s)	Alena Nazdrova	Belarus	46.812
5	Virág Balla	Hungary	46.972
6	Zhang Luqi	China	47.232
7	Staniliya Stamenova	Bulgaria	47.282
8	Nikolina Mijušković	Serbia	48.087
9	Gabriela Ladičová	Slovakia	48.892
