= Canoe sprint at the 2019 European Games – Women's C-1 200 metres =

Women's C-1 200 metres at the 2019 European Games
- Venue: Zaslavl Regatta Course
- Date: 26–27 June
- Competitors: 16 from 16 nations
- Winning time: 50.351

Medalists
gold medal	Alena Nazdrova	Belarus
silver medal	Lisa Jahn	Germany
bronze medal	Dorota Borowska	Poland

The women's C-1 200 metres canoe sprint competition at the 2019 European Games in Minsk took place between 26 and 27 June at the Zaslavl Regatta Course.

== Schedule ==
The schedule was as follows:

Date	Time	Round
Wednesday 26 June 2019	14:40	Heats
Wednesday 26 June 2019	16:25	Semifinal
Thursday 27 June 2019	14:35	Final

All times are Further-eastern European Time (UTC+3)

== Results ==
=== Heats ===
The fastest three boats in each heat advanced directly to the final. The next four fastest boats in each heat, plus the fastest remaining boat advanced to the semifinal.

==== Heat 1 ====
Rank	Canoeist	Country	Time	Notes
1	Olesia Romasenko	Russia	46.866	QF, GB
2	Lisa Jahn	Germany	47.121	QF
3	Alena Nazdrova	Belarus	47.721	QF
4	Jana Ježová	Czech Republic	49.751	QS
5	Vanesa Tot	Croatia	50.026	QS
6	Raquel Da Costa	Spain	51.124	QS
7	Rūta Dagytė	Lithuania	52.296	QS
8	Julie Cailleretz	France	52.986	qS

==== Heat 2 ====
Rank	Canoeist	Country	Time	Notes
1	Dorota Borowska	Poland	48.951	QF
2	Anastasiia Chetverikova	Ukraine	49.123	QF
3	Bianka Nagy	Hungary	49.683	QF
4	Gabriela Ladičová	Slovakia	50.051	QS
5	Staniliya Stamenova	Bulgaria	50.126	QS
6	Mariam Kerdikashvili	Georgia	51.526	QS
7	Afton Fitzhenry	Great Britain	51.818	QS
8	Daniela Cociu	Moldova	54.651	

=== Semifinal ===
The fastest three boats advanced to the final.

Rank	Canoeist	Country	Time	Notes
1	Staniliya Stamenova	Bulgaria	52.197	QF
2	Gabriela Ladičová	Slovakia	52.241	QF
3	Mariam Kerdikashvili	Georgia	52.392	QF
4	Vanesa Tot	Croatia	52.546	
5	Jana Ježová	Czech Republic	52.560	
6	Afton Fitzhenry	Great Britain	53.312	
7	Raquel Da Costa	Spain	54.282	
8	Rūta Dagytė	Lithuania	55.604	
9	Julie Cailleretz	France	57.179	

=== Final ===
Competitors in this final raced for positions 1 to 9, with medals going to the top three.

Rank	Canoeist	Country	Time
1st place, gold medalist(s)	Alena Nazdrova	Belarus	50.351
2nd place, silver medalist(s)	Lisa Jahn	Germany	51.656
3rd place, bronze medalist(s)	Dorota Borowska	Poland	51.731
4	Anastasiia Chetverikova	Ukraine	51.776
5	Olesia Romasenko	Russia	51.806
6	Staniliya Stamenova	Bulgaria	52.919
7	Bianka Nagy	Hungary	53.151
8	Mariam Kerdikashvili	Georgia	54.691
9	Gabriela Ladičová	Slovakia	55.846
