= 2018 ICF Canoe Sprint World Championships – Women's C-1 5000 metres =

Women's C-1 5000 metres at the 2018 ICF Canoe Sprint World Championships
- Venue: Centro de Alto Rendimento de Montemor-o-Velho
- Location: Montemor-o-Velho, Portugal
- Dates: 26 August
- Competitors: 20 from 20 nations
- Winning time: 27:43.020

Medalists
gold medal	Laurence Vincent-Lapointe	Canada
silver medal	Annika Loske	Germany
bronze medal	María Mailliard	Chile

The women's C-1 5000 metres competition at the 2018 ICF Canoe Sprint World Championships in Montemor-o-Velho took place at the Centro de Alto Rendimento de Montemor-o-Velho.

== Schedule ==
The schedule was as follows:

Date	Time	Round
Sunday 26 August 2018	15:00	Final

All times are Western European Summer Time (UTC+1)

== Results ==
As a long-distance event, it was held as a direct final.

Rank	Canoeist	Country	Time
1st place, gold medalist(s)	Laurence Vincent-Lapointe	Canada	27:43.020
2nd place, silver medalist(s)	Annika Loske	Germany	27:52.541
3rd place, bronze medalist(s)	María Mailliard	Chile	27:59.547
4	Volha Klimava	Belarus	28:11.793
5	Xu Shixiao	China	28:42.314
6	Zsanett Lakatos	Hungary	28:59.046
7	María Corbera	Spain	29:04.735
8	Lucia Valová	Slovakia	29:36.998
9	Vanesa Tot	Croatia	29:46.621
10	Jana Ježová	Czech Republic	30:04.560
11	Josephine Bulmer	Australia	30:36.179
12	Ann Marie Armstrong	United States	31:10.517
13	Daniela Cociu	Moldova	31:23.317
14	Ana Rodrigues	Portugal	31:42.785
15	Law Ming	Hong Kong	31:49.238
–	Valdenice Conceição	Brazil	DNF
–	Sylwia Szczerbińska	Poland	DNF
–	Anggie Avegno	Ecuador	DNS
–	Clara Montesdeoca	Guatemala	DNS
–	Kseniia Kurach	Russia	DSQ
