= Katie Reid =

Katie Reid may refer to:

- Katie Reid (footballer) (born 2006), English footballer
- Katie Reid (canoeist) (born 1995), British canoeist

== See also ==
- Kate Reid (1930–1993), Canadian actress
