= 2021 ICF Canoe Sprint World Championships – Women's C-1 500 metres =

Women's C-1 500 metres at the 2021 ICF Canoe Sprint World Championships
- Venue: Lake Bagsværd
- Location: Copenhagen, Denmark
- Dates: 16–18 September
- Competitors: 14 from 14 nations
- Winning time: 2:05.09

Medalists
gold medal	María Mailliard	Chile
silver medal	Liudmyla Luzan	Ukraine
bronze medal	Alena Nazdrova	Belarus

The women's C-1 500 metres competition at the 2021 ICF Canoe Sprint World Championships in Copenhagen took place on Lake Bagsværd.

== Schedule ==
The schedule was as follows:

Date	Time	Round
Thursday 16 September 2021	12:15	Heats
Friday 17 September 2021	14:15	Semifinal
Saturday 18 September 2021	12:03	Final

All times are Central European Summer Time (UTC+2)

== Results ==
=== Heats ===
The fastest three boats in each heat advanced directly to the final.
The next four fastest boats in each heat, plus the fastest remaining boat advanced to the semifinal.

==== Heat 1 ====
Rank	Canoeist	Country	Time	Notes
1	María Mailliard	Chile	2:16.96	QF
2	Katie Vincent	Canada	2:19.14	QF
3	Katie Reid	Great Britain	2:19.97	QF
4	Vanesa Tot	Croatia	2:20.52	QS
5	Alina Kovaleva	RCF	2:25.82	QS
6	Tijana Arsić	Serbia	2:34.48	QS
7	Denisa Řáhová	Czech Republic	2:41.45	QS

==== Heat 2 ====
Rank	Canoeist	Country	Time	Notes
1	María Corbera	Spain	2:12.58	QF
2	Alena Nazdrova	Belarus	2:13.18	QF
3	Liudmyla Luzan	Ukraine	2:13.70	QF
4	Annika Loske	Germany	2:19.25	QS
5	Magda Stanny	Poland	2:20.62	QS
6	Agnes Kiss	Hungary	2:22.41	QS
–	Combe Seck	Senegal	DNS	

=== Semifinal ===
The fastest three boats advanced to the final.

Rank	Canoeist	Country	Time	Notes
1	Agnes Kiss	Hungary	2:13.07	QF
2	Annika Loske	Germany	2:13.84	QF
3	Alina Kovaleva	RCF	2:13.87	QF
4	Magda Stanny	Poland	2:14.54	
5	Tijana Arsić	Serbia	2:22.07	
6	Denisa Řáhová	Czech Republic	2:23.99	
7	Vanesa Tot	Croatia	2:59.99	

=== Final ===
Competitors raced for positions 1 to 9, with medals going to the top three.

Rank	Canoeist	Country	Time
1st place, gold medalist(s)	María Mailliard	Chile	2:05.09
2nd place, silver medalist(s)	Liudmyla Luzan	Ukraine	2:05.77
3rd place, bronze medalist(s)	Alena Nazdrova	Belarus	2:05.86
4	María Corbera	Spain	2:06.17
5	Katie Vincent	Canada	2:06.20
6	Alina Kovaleva	RCF	2:10.39
7	Katie Reid	Great Britain	2:10.95
8	Agnes Kiss	Hungary	2:12.04
9	Annika Loske	Germany	2:14.11
