= 2021 ICF Canoe Sprint World Championships – Women's C-1 200 metres =

Women's C-1 200 metres at the 2021 ICF Canoe Sprint World Championships
- Venue: Lake Bagsværd
- Location: Copenhagen, Denmark
- Dates: 17–19 September
- Competitors: 16 from 16 nations
- Winning time: 46.52

Medalists
gold medal	Katie Vincent	Canada
silver medal	Antía Jácome	Spain
bronze medal	Dorota Borowska	Poland

The women's C-1 200 metres competition at the 2021 ICF Canoe Sprint World Championships in Copenhagen took place on Lake Bagsværd.

== Schedule ==
The schedule was as follows:

Date	Time	Round
Friday 17 September 2021	09:00	Heats
Friday 17 September 2021	15:55	Semifinal
Sunday 19 September 2021	11:03	Final

All times are Central European Summer Time (UTC+2)

== Results ==
=== Heats ===
The fastest three boats in the first heat advanced directly to the final. The fastest four boats in the second heat also advanced directly to the final as two boats were tied for third place.
The next four/three fastest boats in the first/second heats respectively, plus the fastest remaining boat advanced to the semifinal.

==== Heat 1 ====
Rank	Canoeist	Country	Time	Notes
1	Liudmyla Luzan	Ukraine	50.01	QF
2	Alena Nazdrova	Belarus	50.01	QF
3	María Mailliard	Chile	50.23	QF
4	Katie Vincent	Canada	50.37	QS
5	Virág Balla	Hungary	50.77	QS
6	Vanesa Tot	Croatia	52.70	QS
7	Tijana Arsić	Serbia	55.11	QS
–	Combe Seck	Senegal	DNS	

==== Heat 2 ====
Rank	Canoeist	Country	Time	Notes
1	Dorota Borowska	Poland	48.83	QF
2	Antía Jácome	Spain	48.97	QF
3	Irina Andreeva	RCF	49.53	QF
3	Yarisleidis Cirilo	Cuba	49.53	QF
5	Katie Reid	Great Britain	50.12	QS
6	Annika Loske	Germany	52.69	QS
7	Lidia Sulaberidze	Georgia	54.58	QS
8	Denisa Řáhová	Czech Republic	54.66	qS

=== Semifinal ===
The fastest three boats advanced to the final.

Rank	Canoeist	Country	Time	Notes
1	Katie Vincent	Canada	47.10	QF
2	Virág Balla	Hungary	48.00	QF
3	Katie Reid	Great Britain	48.31	QF
4	Vanesa Tot	Croatia	48.87	
5	Annika Loske	Germany	49.97	
6	Tijana Arsić	Serbia	51.41	
7	Lidia Sulaberidze	Georgia	51.58	
8	Denisa Řáhová	Czech Republic	53.00	

=== Final ===
Competitors raced for positions 1 to 10, with medals going to the top three.

Rank	Canoeist	Country	Time
1st place, gold medalist(s)	Katie Vincent	Canada	46.52
2nd place, silver medalist(s)	Antía Jácome	Spain	46.79
3rd place, bronze medalist(s)	Dorota Borowska	Poland	46.90
4	Liudmyla Luzan	Ukraine	47.03
5	María Mailliard	Chile	47.50
6	Irina Andreeva	RCF	47.96
7	Alena Nazdrova	Belarus	47.98
8	Katie Reid	Great Britain	48.11
9	Yarisleidis Cirilo	Cuba	48.85
10	Virág Balla	Hungary	48.98
