= 2024 ICF Canoe Sprint World Championships – Women's C-1 500 metres =

Women's C-1 500 metres at the 2024 ICF Canoe Sprint World Championships
- Venue: Rowing and Canoeing Race Course in Samarkand
- Location: Samarkand, Uzbekistan
- Dates: 23–25 August
- Competitors: 18 from 18 nations
- Winning time: 2:06.881

Medalists
gold medal	Liudmyla Luzan	Ukraine
silver medal	María Mailliard	Chile
bronze medal	Mariya Brovkova	Kazakhstan

The women's C-1 500 metres competition at the 2024 ICF Canoe Sprint World Championships in Samarkand took place in Rowing and Canoeing Race Course in Samarkand.

== Schedule ==
The schedule is as follows:

Date	Time	Round
Friday 23 August 2024	15:18	Heats
Friday 23 August 2024	17:00	Semifinals
Sunday 25 August 2024	11:48	Final B
Sunday 25 August 2024	12:11	Final A

== Results ==
=== Heats ===
The fastest boat in each heat advanced directly to the final. The next six fastest boats in each heat advanced to the semifinal.

==== Heat 1 ====
Rank	Canoeist	Country	Time	Notes
1	Viktoriia Yarchevska	Spain	2:18.445	QF
2	Vanesa Tot	Croatia	2:18.821	QS
3	Dinara Dzhuraeva	Uzbekistan	2:23.894	QS
4	Alina Kovaleva	Individual Neutral Athletes	2:33.872	QS
5	Lee Ye-lin	South Korea	2:35.267	QS
6	Martina Malíková	Czech Republic	2:43.933	QS
7	Deepa Rajput	India	2:45.997	QS

==== Heat 2 ====
Rank	Canoeist	Country	Time	Notes
1	Alena Nazdrova	Individual Neutral Athletes	2:21.578	QF
2	Giada Bragato	Hungary	2:25.539	QS
3	Daniela Cociu	Moldova	2:28.505	QS
4	Anna Palmer	United Kingdom	2:33.719	QS
5	Sayako Shimazu	Japan	2:51.033	QS
6	Cai Shu-han	Chinese Taipei	2:51.697	QS

==== Heat 3 ====
Rank	Canoeist	Country	Time	Notes
1	Liudmyla Luzan	Ukraine	2:16.581	QF
2	María Mailliard	Chile	2:20.137	QS
3	Teng Anshuo	China	2:20.666	QS
4	Mariya Brovkova	Kazakhstan	2:23.045	QS
	Yarisleidis Cirilo	Cuba	DNS	
	Manuela Gómez	Colombia	DQ	

=== Semifinal ===
The fastest three boats in each semi advanced to the A final.
The next four fastest boats in each semi, plus the fastest remaining boat advanced to the final B.

==== Semifinal 1 ====
Rank	Canoeist	Country	Time	Notes
1	Teng Anshuo	China	2:16.673	QA
2	Daniela Cociu	Moldova	2:18.369	QA
3	Mariya Brovkova	Kazakhstan	2:19.640	QA
4	Alina Kovaleva	Individual Neutral Athletes	2:20.004	QB
5	Martina Malíková	Czech Republic	2:22.890	QB
6	Sayako Shimazu	Japan	2:42.354	QB
7	Vanesa Tot	Croatia	3:45.184	QB

==== Semifinal 2 ====
Rank	Canoeist	Country	Time	Notes
1	Giada Bragato	Hungary	2:15.989	QA
2	María Mailliard	Chile	2:16.863	QA
3	Dinara Dzhuraeva	Uzbekistan	2:21.615	QA
4	Anna Palmer	United Kingdom	2:25.935	QB
5	Lee Ye-lin	South Korea	2:27.811	QB
6	Cai Shu-han	Chinese Taipei	2:31.959	QB
7	Deepa Rajput	India	2:54.275	QB

=== Finals ===
==== Final B ====
Competitors in this final raced for positions 10 to 18.

Rank	Canoeist	Country	Time
1	Vanesa Tot	Croatia	2:14.563
2	Alina Kovaleva	Individual Neutral Athletes	2:15.645
3	Lee Ye-lin	South Korea	2:18.621
4	Martina Malíková	Czech Republic	2:19.202
5	Anna Palmer	United Kingdom	2:23.637
6	Cai Shu-han	Chinese Taipei	2:31.197
7	Sayako Shimazu	Japan	2:31.315
8	Deepa Rajput	India	2:39.853

==== Final A ====
Competitors raced for positions 1 to 9, with medals going to the top three.

Rank	Canoeist	Country	Time
1	Liudmyla Luzan	Ukraine	2:06.881
2	María Mailliard	Chile	2:08.912
3	Mariya Brovkova	Kazakhstan	2:09.731
4	Alena Nazdrova	Individual Neutral Athletes	2:09.995
5	Viktoriia Yarchevska	Spain	2:15.501
6	Daniela Cociu	Moldova	2:15.888
7	Dinara Dzhuraeva	Uzbekistan	2:17.798
8	Teng Anshuo	China	2:19.411
9	Giada Bragato	Hungary	2:20.197
