= 2019 ICF Canoe Sprint World Championships – Women's C-1 500 metres =

Women's C-1 500 metres at the 2019 ICF Canoe Sprint World Championships
- Venue: Olympic Centre of Szeged
- Location: Szeged, Hungary
- Dates: 21–23 August
- Competitors: 22 from 22 nations
- Winning time: 2:00.73 WB

Medalists
gold medal	Alena Nazdrova	Belarus
silver medal	Kseniia Kurach	Russia
bronze medal	Anastasiia Chetverikova	Ukraine

The women's C-1 500 metres competition at the 2019 ICF Canoe Sprint World Championships in Szeged took place at the Olympic Centre of Szeged.

== Schedule ==
The schedule was as follows:

Date	Time	Round
Wednesday 21 August 2019	10:25	Heats
Thursday 22 August 2019	15:12	Semifinals
Friday 23 August 2019	14:35	Final B
Friday 23 August 2019	15:17	Final A

All times are Central European Summer Time (UTC+2)

== Results ==
=== Heats ===
Heat winners advanced directly to the A final.
The next six fastest boats in each heat advanced to the semifinals.

==== Heat 1 ====
Rank	Canoeist	Country	Time	Notes
1	Ma Yanan	China	2:11.37	QA
2	Vanesa Tot	Croatia	2:15.30	QS
3	Gulbakhor Fayzieva	Uzbekistan	2:16.10	QS
4	Gabriela Ladičová	Slovakia	2:16.77	QS
5	Trương Thị Phượng	Vietnam	2:17.54	QS
6	Johanna Handrick	Germany	2:22.84	QS
7	Namita Chandel	India	2:34.70	QS
–	Rosalyn Esguerra	Philippines	DNS	

==== Heat 2 ====
Rank	Canoeist	Country	Time	Notes
1	Alena Nazdrova	Belarus	2:09.91	QA
2	Magda Stanny	Poland	2:14.96	QS
3	Giada Bragato	Hungary	2:15.14	QS
4	Afton Fitzhenry	Great Britain	2:16.13	QS
5	Dayumin Dayumin	Indonesia	2:19.24	QS
6	Chui Yuen Shan	Hong Kong	2:28.56	QS
7	Lia Gaetano	United States	2:30.84	QS

==== Heat 3 ====
Rank	Canoeist	Country	Time	Notes
1	Anastasiia Chetverikova	Ukraine	2:08.08	QA
2	Kseniia Kurach	Russia	2:12.77	QS
3	Ştefănica Ursu	Romania	2:16.04	QS
4	Julia Espinosa	Spain	2:24.75	QS
5	Orasa Thiangkathok	Thailand	2:25.26	QS
6	Jūlija Gutova	Latvia	2:27.48	QS
–	Leong I Cheng	Macau	DNS	

=== Semifinals ===
Qualification was as follows:

The fastest three boats in each semi advanced to the A final.
The next four fastest boats in each semi, plus the fastest remaining boat advanced to the B final.

==== Semifinal 1 ====
Rank	Canoeist	Country	Time	Notes
1	Kseniia Kurach	Russia	2:08.65	QA
2	Gulbakhor Fayzieva	Uzbekistan	2:09.29	QA
3	Giada Bragato	Hungary	2:09.91	QA
4	Afton Fitzhenry	Great Britain	2:10.40	QB
5	Trương Thị Phượng	Vietnam	2:10.46	QB
6	Johanna Handrick	Germany	2:15.21	QB
7	Julia Espinosa	Spain	2:20.91	QB
8	Chui Yuen Shan	Hong Kong	2:28.07	qB

==== Semifinal 2 ====
Rank	Canoeist	Country	Time	Notes
1	Ştefănica Ursu	Romania	2:09.85	QA
2	Magda Stanny	Poland	2:10.85	QA
3	Vanesa Tot	Croatia	2:11.01	QA
4	Gabriela Ladičová	Slovakia	2:11.68	QB
5	Jūlija Gutova	Latvia	2:16.15	QB
6	Lia Gaetano	United States	2:21.26	QB
7	Namita Chandel	India	2:26.45	QB
–	Dayumin Dayumin	Indonesia	DSQ	
–	Orasa Thiangkathok	Thailand	DNS	

=== Finals ===
==== Final B ====
Competitors in this final raced for positions 10 to 18.

Rank	Canoeist	Country	Time
1	Gabriela Ladičová	Slovakia	2:09.17
2	Afton Fitzhenry	Great Britain	2:10.80
3	Trương Thị Phượng	Vietnam	2:12.57
4	Johanna Handrick	Germany	2:15.08
5	Julia Espinosa	Spain	2:16.22
6	Jūlija Gutova	Latvia	2:18.53
7	Lia Gaetano	United States	2:20.59
8	Chui Yuen Shan	Hong Kong	2:23.27
9	Namita Chandel	India	2:23.94

==== Final A ====
Competitors raced for positions 1 to 9, with medals going to the top three.

Rank	Canoeist	Country	Time	Notes
1st place, gold medalist(s)	Alena Nazdrova	Belarus	2:00.73	WB
2nd place, silver medalist(s)	Kseniia Kurach	Russia	2:01.64	
3rd place, bronze medalist(s)	Anastasiia Chetverikova	Ukraine	2:03.83	
4	Ma Yanan	China	2:07.68	
5	Giada Bragato	Hungary	2:07.86	
6	Magda Stanny	Poland	2:08.84	
7	Ştefănica Ursu	Romania	2:10.85	
8	Vanesa Tot	Croatia	2:12.10	
9	Gulbakhor Fayzieva	Uzbekistan	2:14.03	
