= Laurence Vincent Lapointe =

Canadian world champion canoeist (b. 1992)

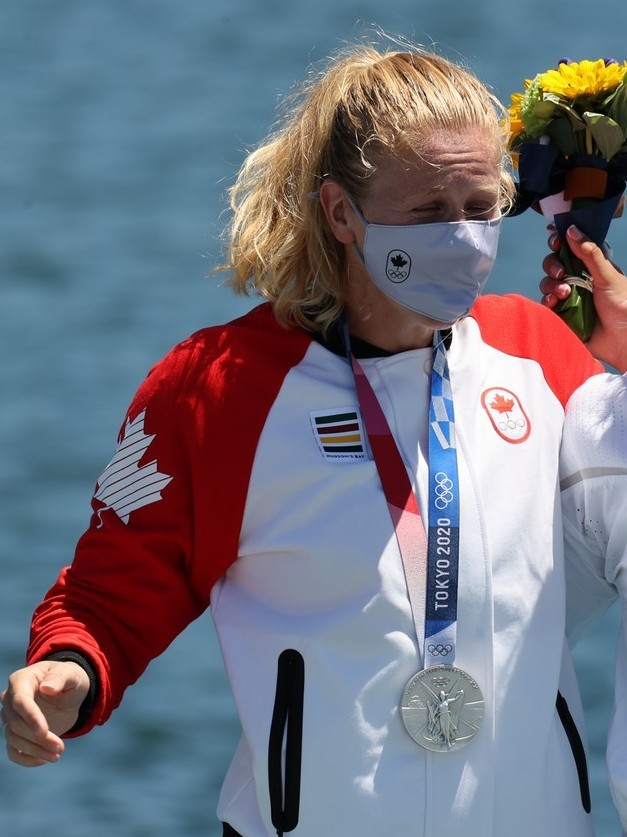

Personal information
- Born: May 27, 1992 (age 34) Trois-Rivières, Quebec
- Height: 1.82 m (6 ft 0 in)
- Weight: 80 kg (176 lb)

Sport
- Sport: Canoe sprint
- Event(s): C–1 200; 5000 m, C2–500 m
- Club: Trois-Rivières
Medal record
Women's canoe sprint
Representing Canada
Olympic Games
Silver medal – second place	2020 Tokyo	C-1 200 m
Bronze medal – third place	2020 Tokyo	C-2 500 m
World Championships
Gold medal – first place	2010 Poznań	C-1 200 m
Gold medal – first place	2011 Szeged	C-1 200 m
Gold medal – first place	2011 Szeged	C-2 500 m
Gold medal – first place	2013 Duisburg	C-1 200 m
Gold medal – first place	2013 Duisburg	C-2 500 m
Gold medal – first place	2014 Moscow	C-1 200 m
Gold medal – first place	2017 Račice	C-1 200 m
Gold medal – first place	2017 Račice	C-2 500 m
Gold medal – first place	2018 Montemor-o-Velho	C-1 200 m
Gold medal – first place	2018 Montemor-o-Velho	C-1 5000 m
Gold medal – first place	2018 Montemor-o-Velho	C-2 500 m
Pan American Games
Gold medal – first place	2015 Toronto	C-1 200 m
World U23 Championships
Gold medal – first place	2013 Niagara	C-1 200 m

Laurence Vincent Lapointe (born May 27, 1992) is a Canadian sprint canoer. She has won eleven gold medals at the ICF Canoe Sprint World Championships, starting with the 2010 Poznań Championships, and most recently three gold medals at the 2018 Montemor-o-Velho Championships. She has also won a gold medal at the 2015 Pan American Games, and silver and bronze medals at the 2020 Summer Olympics in Tokyo.

== Career ==
Laurence Vincent Lapointe first made her name on the international scene in 2010 when she won a pair of gold medals in the C-1 200m and C-2 500m at the ICF World Championships. She repeated those results at the 2011 and 2013 World Championships. Also in 2013, she became the first-ever U-23 world champion in the C-1 200m. In 2014, she won her fourth straight world title in the C-1 200m in world record time of 46.419 seconds. Vincent Lapointe returned to the top of the world championship podium in 2017, winning C-1 200m gold and C-2 500m gold with Katie Vincent.

At the first World Cup of the 2018 season, Vincent Lapointe set another C-1 200m world record with a time of 44.504. She and Vincent also put their names on the C-2 500m world record with a time of 1:53.513. Vincent Lapointe capped the year by winning her sixth world title in the C-1 200m and fifth world title in the C-2 500m. In 2019, she tested positive for traces of ligandrol. The top athlete denied knowingly taking a forbidden substance that resulted in her suspension from competition. In January 2020, the ICF accepted Lapointe’s evidence which supported that she was the victim of third-party contamination of bodily fluids from her former boyfriend, a sports enthusiast, who took the substance, and cleared her retroactively of all charges to return to training and competition.

She went on to win silver and bronze medals at the Tokyo 2020 Summer Olympics, in 2021, in the C-1 200 m and C-2 500 m events, after years of lobbying for women to be able to compete in her sport at the Olympic Games. In 2022 she retired from competition, saying she had achieved "everything I had wanted to do by going to the Olympic Games."

She has a bachelor's degree in Biomedical Sciences from Université de Montréal.
