= Canoeing at the 2015 Pan American Games – Women's C-1 200 metres =

Women's C-1 200 metres at the 2015 Pan American Games
- Venue: Welland Pan Am Flatwater Centre
- Dates: July 14
- Competitors: 8 from 8 nations
- Winning time: 49.685

Medalists
Gold medal	Laurence Vincent Lapointe	Canada
Silver medal	Anggie Avegno	Ecuador
Bronze medal	Valdenice Conceição	Brazil

The women's C-1 200 metres canoeing event at the 2015 Pan American Games will be held on July 14 at the Welland Pan Am Flatwater Centre in Welland.

== Schedule ==
The following is the competition schedule for the event:

All times are Eastern Daylight Time (UTC−4)

Date	Time	Round
July 14, 2015	10:25	Final

== Results ==
=== Final ===
Rank	Athletes	Country	Time	Notes
1st place, gold medalist(s)	Laurence Vincent Lapointe	Canada	49.685	
2nd place, silver medalist(s)	Anggie Avegno	Ecuador	51.998	
3rd place, bronze medalist(s)	Valdenice Conceição	Brazil	53.143	
4	Karen Roco	Chile	53.634	
5	Abigail Morales	Mexico	55.630	
6	Amalia Obregon	Cuba	57.569	
7	Lydia Keefe Sampson	United States	58.178	
8	Keren Guerra	Peru	1:05.445	
