= Olesya Nikiforova =

Russian canoeist (born 1997)

Personal information
- Nationality: Russian
- Born: 15 April 1997 (age 29)

Sport
- Country: Russia
- Sport: Canoe sprint
- Event: Canoeing
Medal record
World Championships
Bronze medal – third place	2018 Montemor-o-Velho	C-2 200 m

Olesya Nikiforova (born 15 April 1997) is a Russian sprint canoeist.

She participated at the 2018 ICF Canoe Sprint World Championships.
