= 2018 ICF Canoe Sprint World Championships – Women's C-2 200 metres =

Women's C-2 200 metres at the 2018 ICF Canoe Sprint World Championships
- Venue: Centro de Alto Rendimento de Montemor-o-Velho
- Location: Montemor-o-Velho, Portugal
- Dates: 25–26 August
- Competitors: 26 from 13 nations
- Winning time: 45.234

Medalists
gold medal	Alena Nazdrova; Kamila Bobr	Belarus
silver medal	Sylwia Szczerbińska; Dorota Borowska	Poland
bronze medal	Kseniia Kurach; Olesya Nikiforova	Russia

The women's C-2 200 metres competition at the 2018 ICF Canoe Sprint World Championships in Montemor-o-Velho took place at the Centro de Alto Rendimento de Montemor-o-Velho.

== Schedule ==
The schedule was as follows:

Date	Time	Round
Saturday 25 August 2018	15:55	Heats
Sunday 26 August 2018	10:25	Semifinal
Sunday 26 August 2018	12:04	Final

All times are Western European Summer Time (UTC+1)

== Results ==
=== Heats ===
The fastest three boats in each heat advanced directly to the final. The next four fastest boats in each heat, plus the fastest remaining boat advanced to the semifinal.

==== Heat 1 ====
Rank	Canoeists	Country	Time	Notes
1	Sylwia Szczerbińska; Dorota Borowska	Poland	47.201	QF
2	Kseniia Kurach; Olesya Nikiforova	Russia	47.705	QF
3	Alena Nazdrova; Kamila Bobr	Belarus	47.771	QF
4	María Pérez; Antía Jácome	Spain	48.218	QS
5	Karen Roco; María Mailliard	Chile	48.491	QS
6	Bianka Nagy; Csenge Molnár	Hungary	49.108	QS
7	Ana Ochoa; Manuela Gómez	Colombia	51.315	QS

==== Heat 2 ====
Rank	Canoeists	Country	Time	Notes
1	Hannah MacIntosh; Nadya Crossman-Serb	Canada	48.814	QF
2	Li Qi; Zhang Yajue	China	49.654	QF
3	Laura Ruiz; Flore Caupain	France	49.930	QF
4	Alexandra Dragomirescu; Adina Cale	Romania	50.830	QS
5	Maria Olarasu; Daniela Cociu	Moldova	52.181	QS
6	Oulimata Fall; Combe Seck	Senegal	56.297	QS

=== Semifinal ===
The fastest three boats advanced to the final.

Rank	Canoeists	Country	Time	Notes
1	Bianka Nagy; Csenge Molnár	Hungary	47.329	QF
2	María Pérez; Antía Jácome	Spain	47.696	QF
3	Maria Olarasu; Daniela Cociu	Moldova	47.846	QF
4	Ana Ochoa; Manuela Gómez	Colombia	48.146	
5	Alexandra Dragomirescu; Adina Cale	Romania	48.219	
6	Oulimata Fall; Combe Seck	Senegal	53.906	
7	Karen Roco; María Mailliard	Chile	1:10.224	

=== Final ===
Competitors raced for positions 1 to 9, with medals going to the top three.

Rank	Canoeists	Country	Time
1st place, gold medalist(s)	Alena Nazdrova; Kamila Bobr	Belarus	45.234
2nd place, silver medalist(s)	Sylwia Szczerbińska; Dorota Borowska	Poland	46.158
3rd place, bronze medalist(s)	Kseniia Kurach; Olesya Nikiforova	Russia	46.668
4	Hannah MacIntosh; Nadya Crossman-Serb	Canada	47.185
5	Li Qi; Zhang Yajue	China	48.131
6	Bianka Nagy; Csenge Molnár	Hungary	48.185
7	María Pérez; Antía Jácome	Spain	48.358
8	Maria Olarasu; Daniela Cociu	Moldova	49.118
9	Laura Ruiz; Flore Caupain	France	49.551
