= 2024 ICF Canoe Sprint World Championships – Women's C-1 1000 metres =

Women's C-1 1000 metres at the 2024 ICF Canoe Sprint World Championships
- Venue: Rowing and Canoeing Race Course in Samarkand
- Location: Samarkand, Uzbekistan
- Dates: 23–24 August
- Competitors: 17 from 17 nations
- Winning time: 4:45.286

Medalists
gold medal	Alena Nazdrova	Individual Neutral Athletes
silver medal	Giada Bragato	Hungary
bronze medal	Jiang Xina	China

The women's C-1 1000 metres competition at the 2024 ICF Canoe Sprint World Championships in Samarkand took place in Rowing and Canoeing Race Course in Samarkand.

== Schedule ==
The schedule is as follows:

Date	Time	Round
Friday 23 August 2024	09:28	Heats
Friday 23 August 2024	11:14	Semifinals
Saturday 24 August 2024	14:20	Final A

== Results ==
=== Heats ===
The fastest three boats in each heat advanced directly to the final.
The next four fastest boats in each heat, plus the fastest remaining boat advanced to the semifinal

==== Heat 1 ====
Rank	Canoeist	Country	Time	Notes
1	Jiang Xina	China	4:39.250	QF
2	Maria Olărașu	Moldova	4:45.039	QF
3	Dinara Dzhuraeva	Uzbekistan	4:47.580	QF
4	Anna Palmer	Great Britain	4:59.458	QS
5	Martina Malíková	Czech Republic	5:00.057	QS
6	Marina Gureeva	Individual Neutral Athletes	5:05.623	QS
7	Parvinder Kaur	India	5:24.510	QS
8	Chiang Hsin-tung	Chinese Taipei	5:36.568	
	Manuela Gómez	Colombia	DSQ	

==== Heat 2 ====
Rank	Canoeist	Country	Time	Notes
1	Giada Bragato	Hungary	4:39.576	QF
2	Alena Nazdrova	Individual Neutral Athletes	4:41.342	QF
3	Valeriia Tereta	Ukraine	4:44.266	QF
4	Annika Loske	Germany	4:47.484	QS
5	María Mailliard	Chile	4:48.477	QS
6	Mariya Brovkova	Kazakhstan	4:50.449	QS
7	Lee Ye-lin	South Korea	5:07.625	QS
8	Valéria Oliveira	Spain	5:09.575	qS

=== Semifinal ===
The fastest three boats advanced to the A final.

Rank	Canoeist	Country	Time	Notes
1	María Mailliard	Chile	4:49.938	QF
2	Annika Loske	Germany	4:51.416	QF
3	Mariya Brovkova	Kazakhstan	4:54.165	QF
4	Valéria Oliveira	Spain	5:00.004	
5	Anna Palmer	Great Britain	5:07.487	
6	Marina Gureeva	Individual Neutral Athletes	5:10.453	
7	Martina Malíková	Czech Republic	5:15.675	
8	Lee Ye-lin	South Korea	5:27.671	
9	Parvinder Kaur	India	5:35.476	

=== Final ===
Competitors raced for positions 1 to 9, with medals going to the top three.

Rank	Canoeist	Country	Time
1st place, gold medalist(s)	Alena Nazdrova	Individual Neutral Athletes	4:45.286
2nd place, silver medalist(s)	Giada Bragato	Hungary	4:47.684
3rd place, bronze medalist(s)	Jiang Xina	China	4:49.521
4	María Mailliard	Chile	4:49.866
5	Valeriia Tereta	Ukraine	4:59.072
6	Annika Loske	Germany	4:59.917
7	Dinara Dzhuraeva	Uzbekistan	5:02.594
8	Mariya Brovkova	Kazakhstan	5:02.786
9	Maria Olărașu	Moldova	5:26.777
