= 2022 ICF Canoe Sprint World Championships – Women's C-1 500 metres =

Women's C-1 500 metres at the 2022 ICF Canoe Sprint World Championships
- Venue: Lake Banook
- Location: Dartmouth, Canada
- Dates: 4–7 August
- Competitors: 10 from 10 nations
- Winning time: 2:22.34

Medalists
gold medal	Liudmyla Luzan	Ukraine
silver medal	Sophia Jensen	Canada
bronze medal	María Mailliard	Chile

The women's C-1 500 metres competition at the 2022 ICF Canoe Sprint World Championships in Dartmouth took place on Lake Banook.

== Schedule ==
The schedule is as follows:

Date	Time	Round
Thursday 4 August 2022	10:55	Heats
Friday 5 August 2022	16:00	Semifinal
Sunday 7 August 2022	11:44	Final

== Results ==
=== Heats ===
The fastest three boats in each heat advanced directly to the final.
The next four fastest boats in each heat, plus the fastest remaining boat advanced to the semifinal.

==== Heat 1 ====
Rank	Canoeist	Country	Time	Notes
1	Liudmyla Luzan	Ukraine	2:16.75	QF
2	Maria Olărașu	Moldova	2:18.22	QF
3	María Mailliard	Chile	2:21.28	QF
4	Andreea Ghizila	United States	2:25.49	QS
5	Combe Seck	Senegal	2:56.30	QS

==== Heat 2 ====
Rank	Canoeist	Country	Time	Notes
1	Sophia Jensen	Canada	2:12.82	QF
2	Lisa Jahn	Germany	2:14.25	QF
3	Virág Balla	Hungary	2:16.03	QF
4	Katarzyna Szperkiewicz	Poland	2:17.99	QS
5	Vanesa Tot	Croatia	2:23.52	QS

=== Semifinal ===
The fastest three boats advanced to the final.

Rank	Canoeist	Country	Time	Notes
1	Katarzyna Szperkiewicz	Poland	2:21.31	QF
2	Andreea Ghizila	United States	2:25.43	QF
3	Vanesa Tot	Croatia	2:28.62	QF
4	Combe Seck	Senegal	2:58.65	

=== Final ===
Competitors raced for positions 1 to 9, with medals going to the top three.

Rank	Canoeist	Country	Time	Notes
1st place, gold medalist(s)	Liudmyla Luzan	Ukraine	2:22.34	
2nd place, silver medalist(s)	Sophia Jensen	Canada	2:23.21	
3rd place, bronze medalist(s)	María Mailliard	Chile	2:24.43	
4	Virág Balla	Hungary	2:27.72	
5	Lisa Jahn	Germany	2:28.58	
6	Vanesa Tot	Croatia	2:29.85	
7	Maria Olărașu	Moldova	2:32.26	
8	Katarzyna Szperkiewicz	Poland	2:36.49	
9	Andreea Ghizila	United States	2:41.78	
