= Ksenia Kurach =

Russian canoeist (born 1997)

Kseniia Kurach
Personal information
- Nationality: Russian
- Born: April 1, 1997 (age 29)

Sport
- Country: Russia
- Sport: Sprint canoe
- Event(s): C-1 500 m, C-2 200 m, C-2 500 m
Medal record
Women's sprint canoe
Representing Russia
World Championships
Gold medal – first place	2018 Montemor-o-Velho	C-1 500 m
Silver medal – second place	2019 Szeged	C-1 500 m
Bronze medal – third place	2018 Montemor-o-Velho	C-2 200 m
European Games
Bronze medal – third place	2019 Minsk	C-2 500 m
European Championships
Silver medal – second place	2018 Belgrade	C-1 500 m

Ksenia Igorevna Kurach (Russian: Ксения Игоревна Курач; born 1 April 1997) is a Russian sprint canoeist.

She participated at the 2018 ICF Canoe Sprint World Championships. She won the gold medal at the first ever C-1 500 m women's event.
