= 2017 ICF Canoe Sprint World Championships – Women's C-2 500 metres =

Women's C-2 500 metres at the 2017 ICF Canoe Sprint World Championships
- Venue: Sportcentrum Račice
- Location: Račice, Czech Republic
- Dates: 24–26 August
- Competitors: 48 from 24 nations
- Winning time: 1:56.752 WB

Medalists
gold medal	Katie Vincent; Laurence Vincent-Lapointe	Canada
silver medal	Irina Andreeva; Olesia Romasenko	Russia
bronze medal	Kamila Bobr; Alena Nazdrova	Belarus

The women's C-2 500 metres competition at the 2017 ICF Canoe Sprint World Championships in Račice took place at the Sportcentrum Račice.

== Schedule ==
The schedule was as follows:

Date	Time	Round
Thursday 24 August 2017	08:30	Heats
Thursday 24 August 2017	15:30	Semifinals
Saturday 26 August 2017	09:09	Final B
Saturday 26 August 2017	10:35	Final A

All times are Central European Summer Time (UTC+2)

== Results ==
=== Heats ===
Heat winners advanced directly to the A final. The next six fastest boats in each heat advanced to the semifinals.

==== Heat 1 ====
Rank	Canoeists	Country	Time	Notes
1	Katie Vincent; Laurence Vincent-Lapointe	Canada	1:59.649	QA
2	Alena Nazdrova; Kamila Bobr	Belarus	2:01.021	QS
3	Lenka Součková; Jana Ježová	Czech Republic	2:07.932	QS
4	Adriana Paniagua; Patricia Coco	Spain	2:07.988	QS
5	Ophelia Preller; Annika Loske	Germany	2:08.649	QS
6	Bethany Gill; Afton Fitzhenry	Great Britain	2:13.482	QS
7	Valentina Postariu; Alexandra Dragomirescu	Romania	2:16.638	QS
8	Daniela Cociu; Maria Olărașu	Moldova	2:20.966	
–	Nato Chkhutiashvili; Mariami Kerdikashvili	Georgia	DSQ (Note: Nato Chkhutiashvili and Mariami Kerdikashvili were disqualified for violating ICF rule 23.2)	

==== Heat 2 ====
Rank	Canoeists	Country	Time	Notes
1	Irina Andreeva; Olesia Romasenko	Russia	2:02.469	QA
2	Eugénie Dorange; Julie Cailleretz	France	2:08.258	QS
3	Andrea Oliveira; Angela Silva	Brazil	2:09.096	QS
4	Riska Andriyani; Putri Wahyuni	Indonesia	2:10.646	QS
5	Lucia Valová; Hana Mikéciová	Slovakia	2:20.585	QS
6	Wang Aorong; Shi Shuyi	China	2:21.785	QS
7	Rajeshwari Kushram; Meera Das	India	2:23.324	QS
–	Ann Marie Armstrong; Kaley Martin	United States	DNF	

==== Heat 3 ====
Rank	Canoeists	Country	Time	Notes
1	Virág Balla; Kincső Takács	Hungary	2:05.561	QA
2	Sayako Shimazu; Manaka Kubota	Japan	2:06.945	QS
3	Iwona Czarnecka; Magda Stanny	Poland	2:12.433	QS
4	Lissette Espinoza; Anggie Avegno	Ecuador	2:14.489	QS
5	Márcia Faria; Beatriz Barros	Portugal	2:21.667	QS
6	Thet Phyo Naing; Khaing Thazin Tun	Myanmar	2:32.072	QS
7	Elizaveta Bukhantsova; Margarita Bobrova	Kyrgyzstan	2:44.872	QS

=== Semifinals ===
Qualification was as follows:

The fastest four boats in the first semi advanced to the A final as two boats were tied for third place. The fastest three boats in the second semi also advanced to the A final.
The next four fastest boats in each semi, plus the fastest remaining boat advanced to the B final.

==== Semifinal 1 ====
Rank	Canoeists	Country	Time	Notes
1	Ophelia Preller; Annika Loske	Germany	2:08.042	QA
2	Sayako Shimazu; Manaka Kubota	Japan	2:08.187	QA
3	Andrea Santos de Oliveira; Andrea Aparecida Elias da Silva	Brazil	2:09.176	QA
3	Lenka Součková; Jana Ježová	Czech Republic	2:09.176	QA
5	Bethany Gill; Afton Fitzhenry	Great Britain	2:13.970	QB
6	Lissette Espinoza; Anggie Avegno	Ecuador	2:14.187	QB
7	Riska Andriyani; Putri Wahyuni	Indonesia	2:15.265	QB
8	Wang Aorong; Shi Shuyi	China	2:21.720	QB
9	Elizaveta Bukhantsova; Margarita Bobrova	Kyrgyzstan	2:46.798	

==== Semifinal 2 ====
Rank	Canoeists	Country	Time	Notes
1	Alena Nazdrova; Kamila Bobr	Belarus	2:04.892	QA
2	Eugénie Dorange; Julie Cailleretz	France	2:08.287	QA
3	Adriana Paniagua; Patricia Coco	Spain	2:08.970	QA
4	Valentina Postariu; Alexandra Dragomirescu	Romania	2:11.681	QB
5	Iwona Czarnecka; Magda Stanny	Poland	2:14.003	QB
6	Lucia Valová; Hana Mikéciová	Slovakia	2:20.148	QB
7	Márcia Faria; Beatriz Barros	Portugal	2:20.731	QB
8	Rajeshwari Kushram; Meera Das	India	2:26.720	qB
–	Thet Phyo Naing; Khaing Thazin Tun	Myanmar	DSQ (Note: Thet Phyo Naing and Khaing Thazin Tun were disqualified for violating ICF rule 23.2)	

=== Finals ===
==== Final B ====
Competitors in this final raced for positions 11 to 19.

Rank	Canoeists	Country	Time
1	Riska Andriyani; Putri Wahyuni	Indonesia	2:09.224
2	Iwona Czarnecka; Magda Stanny	Poland	2:09.741
3	Valentina Postariu; Alexandra Dragomirescu	Romania	2:10.530
4	Lissette Espinoza; Anggie Avegno	Ecuador	2:10.947
5	Bethany Gill; Afton Fitzhenry	Great Britain	2:12.502
6	Lucia Valová; Hana Mikéciová	Slovakia	2:13.185
7	Márcia Faria; Beatriz Barros	Portugal	2:20.413
8	Wang Aorong; Shi Shuyi	China	2:20.785
9	Rajeshwari Kushram; Meera Das	India	2:24.613

==== Final A ====
Competitors in this final raced for positions 1 to 10, with medals going to the top three.

Rank	Canoeists	Country	Time	Notes
1st place, gold medalist(s)	Katie Vincent; Laurence Vincent-Lapointe	Canada	1:56.752	WB
2nd place, silver medalist(s)	Irina Andreeva; Olesia Romasenko	Russia	1:57.264	
3rd place, bronze medalist(s)	Alena Nazdrova; Kamila Bobr	Belarus	1:57.858	
4	Virág Balla; Kincső Takács	Hungary	1:58.802	
5	Eugénie Dorange; Julie Cailleretz	France	2:02.891	
6	Andrea Santos de Oliveira; Andrea Aparecida Elias da Silva	Brazil	2:04.102	
7	Ophelia Preller; Annika Loske	Germany	2:04.547	
8	Adriana Paniagua; Patricia Coco	Spain	2:04.680	
9	Lenka Součková; Jana Ježová	Czech Republic	2:05.791	
10	Sayako Shimazu; Manaka Kubota	Japan	2:05.997	
