= 2021 ICF Canoe Sprint World Championships – Women's C-1 5000 metres =

Women's C-1 5000 metres at the 2021 ICF Canoe Sprint World Championships
- Venue: Lake Bagsværd
- Location: Copenhagen, Denmark
- Dates: 19 September
- Competitors: 12 from 12 nations
- Winning time: 26:18.94

Medalists
gold medal	Volha Klimava	Belarus
silver medal	Zsófia Kisbán	Hungary
bronze medal	María Mailliard	Chile

The women's C-1 5000 metres competition at the 2021 ICF Canoe Sprint World Championships in Copenhagen took place on Lake Bagsværd.

== Schedule ==
The schedule was as follows:

Date	Time	Round
Sunday 19 September 2021	14:30	Final

All times are Central European Summer Time (UTC+2)

== Results ==
As a long-distance event, it was held as a direct final.

Rank	Canoeist	Country	Time
1st place, gold medalist(s)	Volha Klimava	Belarus	26:18.94
2nd place, silver medalist(s)	Zsófia Kisbán	Hungary	26:37.32
3rd place, bronze medalist(s)	María Mailliard	Chile	26:39.51
4	María Corbera	Spain	26:58.12
5	Annika Loske	Germany	27:31.04
6	Katie Vincent	Canada	27:32.14
7	Alina Kovaleva	RCF	27:42.98
8	Jana Zetek	Czech Republic	28:19.73
9	Julia Walczak	Poland	28:33.75
10	Yarisleidis Cirilo	Cuba	28:56.49
11	Bethany Gill	Great Britain	29:11.37
–	Olena Tsyhankova	Ukraine	DNF
