= Kamila Bobr =

Belarusian sprint canoeist (born 1997)

Personal information
- Nationality: Belarusian
- Born: 7 May 1997 (age 29) Tvorichevka, Belarus

Sport
- Country: Belarus
- Sport: Canoe sprint
- Event: Canoeing
Medal record
World Championships
Gold medal – first place	2018 Montemor-o-Velho	C-2 200 m

Kamila Bobr (born 7 May 1997) is a Belarusian sprint canoeist.

She participated at the 2018 ICF Canoe Sprint World Championships.
