= Olesia Romasenko =

Russian canoeist (born 1990)

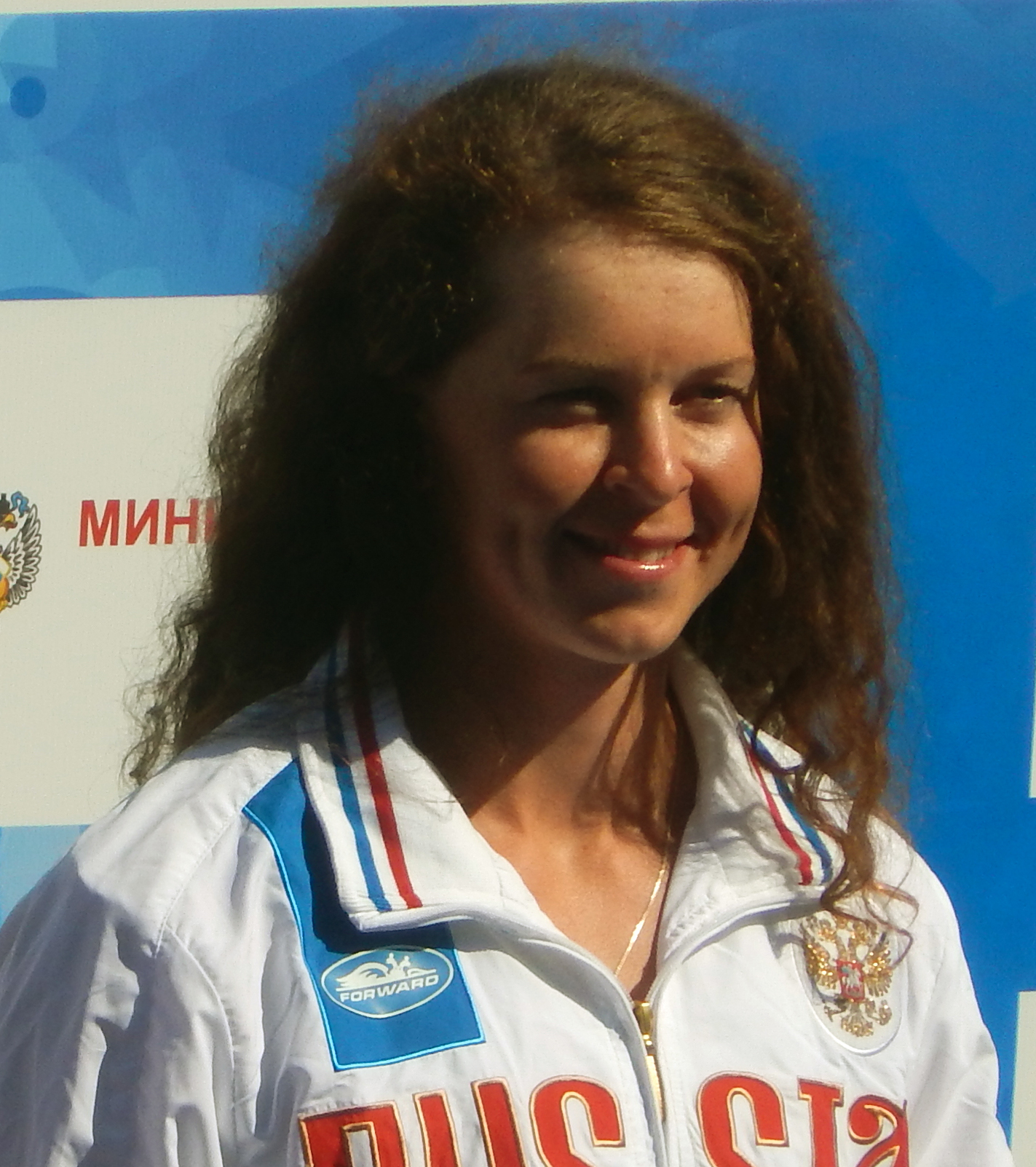

Personal information
- Full name: Olesya Viktorovna Romasenko
- Nationality: (Russia) Russian
- Born: 12 January 1990 (age 36) Krasnodar, Soviet Union

Sport
- Country: Russia
- Sport: Sprint canoe
- Event(s): C-1 200 m, C-2 500 m
Medal record
Women's canoe sprint
Representing Russia
World Championships
| Silver medal – second place | 2015 Milan | C-2 500 m |
| Silver medal – second place | 2017 Račice | C-1 200 m |
| Silver medal – second place | 2017 Račice | C-2 500 m |
| Silver medal – second place | 2018 Montemor-o-Velho | C-1 200 m |
| Silver medal – second place | 2019 Szeged | C-1 200 m |
| Bronze medal – third place | 2014 Moscow | C-2 500 m |
European Games
| Bronze medal – third place | 2019 Minsk | C-2 500 m |
European Championships
| Gold medal – first place | 2016 Moscow | C-1 200 m |
| Gold medal – first place | 2017 Plovdiv | C-1 200 m |
| Gold medal – first place | 2018 Belgrade | C-1 200 m |
| Gold medal – first place | 2021 Poznań | C-2 200 m |
| Silver medal – second place | 2016 Moscow | C-2 500 m |
| Bronze medal – third place | 2014 Branderburg | C-2 500 m |
| Bronze medal – third place | 2017 Plovdiv | C-2 500 m |
| Bronze medal – third place | 2018 Belgrade | C-2 200 m |
| Bronze medal – third place | 2018 Belgrade | C-2 500 m |
| Bronze medal – third place | 2021 Poznań | C-1 200 m |

Olesya Viktorovna Romasenko (Russian: Олеся Викторовна Ромасенко; born 12 January 1990) is a Russian sprint canoeist.

She participated at the 2018 ICF Canoe Sprint World Championships.
