= 2024 ICF Canoe Sprint World Championships – Women's C-1 5000 metres =

Women's C-1 5000 metres at the 2024 ICF Canoe Sprint World Championships
- Venue: Rowing and Canoeing Race Course in Samarkand
- Location: Samarkand, Uzbekistan
- Dates: 25 August
- Competitors: 14 from 14 nations
- Winning time: 31:15.084

Medalists
gold medal	María Mailliard	Chile
silver medal	Annika Loske	Germany
bronze medal	Valeriia Tereta	Ukraine

The women's C-1 5000 metres competition at the 2024 ICF Canoe Sprint World Championships in Samarkand took place in Rowing and Canoeing Race Course in Samarkand.

== Schedule ==
The schedule is as follows:

Date	Time	Round
Sunday 25 August 2024	16:04	Final

== Results ==
As a long-distance event, it was held as a direct final.

Rank	Canoeist	Country	Time
1st place, gold medalist(s)	María Mailliard	Chile	31:15.084
2nd place, silver medalist(s)	Annika Loske	Germany	31:37.596
3rd place, bronze medalist(s)	Valeriia Tereta	Ukraine	31:53.552
4	Martina Malíková	Czech Republic	32:40.352
5	Daniela Cociu	Moldova	32:49.452
6	Anna Palmer	Great Britain	32:57.156
7	Alena Nazdrova	Authorised Neutral Athletes	33:08.060
8	Ana Cantero	Spain	33:31.574
9	Giada Bragato	Hungary	34:26.747
10	Dilnoza Rakhmatova	Uzbekistan	34:56.243
11	Lee Ye-lin	South Korea	36:09.449
	Rufina Iskakova	Kazakhstan	DNF
	Jiang Xina	China	DNF
	Cai Shu-han	Chinese Taipei	DNF
