= 2018 ICF Canoe Sprint World Championships – Women's C-1 500 metres =

Women's C-1 500 metres at the 2018 ICF Canoe Sprint World Championships
- Venue: Centro de Alto Rendimento de Montemor-o-Velho
- Location: Montemor-o-Velho, Portugal
- Dates: 23–24 August
- Competitors: 21 from 21 nations
- Winning time: 2:10.991

Medalists
gold medal	Kseniia Kurach	Russia
silver medal	Alena Nazdrova	Belarus
bronze medal	Katie Vincent	Canada

The women's C-1 500 metres competition at the 2018 ICF Canoe Sprint World Championships in Montemor-o-Velho took place at the Centro de Alto Rendimento de Montemor-o-Velho.

== Schedule ==
The schedule was as follows:

Date	Time	Round
Thursday 23 August 2018	11:23	Heats
Friday 24 August 2018	10:50	Semifinals
Friday 24 August 2018	15:20	Final B
Friday 24 August 2018	16:17	Final A

All times are Western European Summer Time (UTC+1)

== Results ==
=== Heats ===
Heat winners advanced directly to the A final. The next six fastest boats in each heat advanced to the semifinals.

==== Heat 1 ====
Rank	Canoeist	Country	Time	Notes
1	Alena Nazdrova	Belarus	2:09.647	QA
2	Chloe Bracewell	Great Britain	2:20.847	QS
3	Jūlija Gutova	Latvia	2:22.262	QS
4	Lucia Valová	Slovakia	2:26.158	QS
5	Law Ming	Hong Kong	2:27.393	QS
6	Ana Ochoa	Colombia	2:27.593	QS
7	Ana Rodrigues	Portugal	2:29.848	QS

==== Heat 2 ====
Rank	Canoeist	Country	Time	Notes
1	Katie Vincent	Canada	2:06.507	QA
2	Kseniia Kurach	Russia	2:06.967	QS
3	Zsanett Lakatos	Hungary	2:12.937	QS
4	Liudmyla Luzan	Ukraine	2:14.632	QS
5	Mariami Kerdikashvili	Georgia	2:15.437	QS
6	Anggie Avegno	Ecuador	2:25.703	QS
7	Daniela Cociu	Moldova	2:27.833	QS

==== Heat 3 ====
Rank	Canoeist	Country	Time	Notes
1	Xu Shixiao	China	2:09.792	QA
2	Magda Stanny	Poland	2:15.367	QS
3	Annika Loske	Germany	2:18.052	QS
4	Sayako Shimazu	Japan	2:22.633	QS
5	Ann Marie Armstrong	United States	2:25.653	QS
6	Patricia Coco	Spain	2:26.958	QS
7	Combe Seck	Senegal	2:50.814	QS

=== Semifinals ===
Qualification was as follows:

The fastest three boats in each semi advanced to the A final. The next four fastest boats in each semi, plus the fastest remaining boat advanced to the B final.

==== Semifinal 1 ====
Rank	Canoeist	Country	Time	Notes
1	Zsanett Lakatos	Hungary	2:15.387	QA
2	Lucia Valová	Slovakia	2:16.882	QA
3	Mariami Kerdikashvili	Georgia	2:18.572	QA
4	Annika Loske	Germany	2:18.937	QB
5	Chloe Bracewell	Great Britain	2:21.158	QB
6	Sayako Shimazu	Japan	2:24.488	QB
7	Daniela Cociu	Moldova	2:24.853	QB
8	Patricia Coco	Spain	2:27.263	qB
9	Ana Ochoa	Colombia	2:32.343	

==== Semifinal 2 ====
Rank	Canoeist	Country	Time	Notes
1	Liudmyla Luzan	Ukraine	2:16.306	QA
2	Kseniia Kurach	Russia	2:16.861	QA
3	Magda Stanny	Poland	2:17.686	QA
4	Anggie Avegno	Ecuador	2:19.211	QB
5	Jūlija Gutova	Latvia	2:23.962	QB
6	Ann Marie Armstrong	United States	2:26.157	QB
7	Ana Rodrigues	Portugal	2:27.317	QB
8	Law Ming	Hong Kong	2:28.672	
9	Combe Seck	Senegal	2:49.103	

=== Finals ===
==== Final B ====
Competitors in this final raced for positions 10 to 18.

Rank	Canoeist	Country	Time
1	Annika Loske	Germany	2:22.162
2	Chloe Bracewell	Great Britain	2:22.852
3	Daniela Cociu	Moldova	2:25.047
4	Patricia Coco	Spain	2:27.627
5	Anggie Avegno	Ecuador	2:27.632
6	Ann Marie Armstrong	United States	2:30.032
7	Sayako Shimazu	Japan	2:32.183
8	Jūlija Gutova	Latvia	2:36.458
9	Ana Rodrigues	Portugal	2:40.298

==== Final A ====
Competitors in this final raced for positions 1 to 9, with medals going to the top three.

Rank	Canoeist	Country	Time
1st place, gold medalist(s)	Kseniia Kurach	Russia	2:10.991
2nd place, silver medalist(s)	Alena Nazdrova	Belarus	2:11.631
3rd place, bronze medalist(s)	Katie Vincent	Canada	2:12.148
4	Xu Shixiao	China	2:12.875
5	Zsanett Lakatos	Hungary	2:19.448
6	Liudmyla Luzan	Ukraine	2:21.115
7	Magda Stanny	Poland	2:22.118
8	Mariami Kerdikashvili	Georgia	2:24.365
9	Lucia Valová	Slovakia	2:30.206
