= 2025 ICF Canoe Sprint World Championships – Women's C-1 500 metres =

Women's C-1 500 metres at the 2025 ICF Canoe Sprint World Championships
- Venue: Idroscalo Regatta Course
- Location: Milan, Italy
- Dates: 20–23 August
- Competitors: 24 from 24 nations
- Winning time: 2:01.27

Medalists
gold medal	Liudmyla Luzan	Ukraine
silver medal	Katie Vincent	Canada
bronze medal	María Corbera	Spain

The women's C-1 500 metres competition at the 2025 ICF Canoe Sprint World Championships in Milan took place in Idroscalo Regatta Course.

== Schedule ==
The schedule is as follows:

Date	Time	Round
Wednesday 20 August 2025	13:00	Heats
Friday 22 August 2025	09:40	Semifinals
Saturday 23 August 2025	13:43	Final B
Saturday 23 August 2025	14:34	Final A

== Results ==
=== Heats ===
The fastest boat in each heat advanced directly to the final (QF). The next six fastest boats in each heat advanced to the semi-finals (QS).

==== Heat 1 ====
Rank	Canoeist	Country	Time	Notes
1	Liudmyla Luzan	Ukraine	2:03.74	QF
2	Réka Opavszky	Hungary	2:07.22	QS
3	Aleksandra Vlasova	Individual Neutral Athletes	2:07.93	QS
4	Herlin Aprilin Lali	Indonesia	2:13.28	QS
5	Khonzoda Erkinova	Uzbekistan	2:14.40	QS
6	Denisa Řáhová	Czech Republic	2:16.96	QS
7	Megumi Tsubota	Japan	2:26.32	QS
8	Tamara Pavić	Bosnia and Herzegovina	2:38.50	

==== Heat 2 ====
Rank	Canoeist	Country	Time	Notes
1	Katie Vincent	Canada	2:02.20	QF
2	María Corbera	Spain	2:04.31	QS
3	Ma Yanan	China	2:04.37	QS
4	Olympia Della Giustina	Italy	2:06.74	QS
5	Tetiana Smylovenko	Azerbaijan	1:55.71	QS
6	Rufina Iskakova	Kazakhstan	1:59.56	QS
7	Yurely Marín	Colombia	2:01.48	qS
8	Julija Jevtušenkaitė	Lithuania	2:29.01	

==== Heat 3 ====
Rank	Canoeist	Country	Time	Notes
1	Daniela Cociu	Moldova	2:05.60	QF
2	María Mailliard	Chile	2:08.35	QS
3	Vanesa Tot	Croatia	2:08.37	QS
4	Bethany Gill	Great Britain	2:10.42	QS
5	Orasa Thiangkathok	Thailand	2:13.41	QS
6	Emma Albrecht	United States	2:14.00	QS
7	Lee Ye-lin	South Korea	2:15.18	QS
8	Radostina Angelova	Bulgaria	2:15.87	

=== Semifinals ===
The fastest three boats in each semi advanced to the A final. The next four fastest boats in each semi and best 8th advanced to the final B.

==== Semifinal 1 ====
Rank	Canoeist	Country	Time	Notes
1	Réka Opavszky	Hungary	2:07.69	FA
2	Ma Yanan	China	2:09.38	FA
3	Denisa Řáhová	Czech Republic	2:09.53	FA
4	Tetiana Smylovenko	Azerbaijan	2:09.62	FB
5	Vanesa Tot	Croatia	2:12.43	FB
6	Bethany Gill	Great Britain	2:14.60	FB
7	Emma Albrecht	United States	2:15.83	FB
8	Herlin Aprilin Lali	Indonesia	2:15.87	fB
9	Yurely Marín	Colombia	2:22.04	

==== Semifinal 2 ====
Rank	Canoeist	Country	Time	Notes
1	María Corbera	Spain	2:09.30	FA
2	Olympia Della Giustina	Italy	2:09.98	FA
3	María Mailliard	Chile	2:10.50	FA
4	Aleksandra Vlasova	Individual Neutral Athletes	2:12.35	FB
5	Khonzoda Erkinova	Uzbekistan	2:16.73	FB
6	Rufina Iskakova	Kazakhstan	2:17.67	FB
7	Lee Ye-lin	South Korea	2:17.98	FB
8	Orasa Thiangkathok	Thailand	2:18.42	
9	Megumi Tsubota	Japan	2:26.31	

=== Finals ===
==== Final B ====
Competitors in this final raced for positions 10 to 18.

Rank	Canoeist	Country	Time	Notes
1	Tetiana Smylovenko	Azerbaijan	2:08.26	
2	Aleksandra Vlasova	Individual Neutral Athletes	2:09.18	
3	Vanesa Tot	Croatia	2:11.26	
4	Bethany Gill	Great Britain	2:13.50	
5	Herlin Aprilin Lali	Indonesia	2:14.10	
6	Emma Albrecht	United States	2:15.52	
7	Lee Ye-lin	South Korea	2:20.32	
8	Khonzoda Erkinova	Uzbekistan	2:22.09	
9	Rufina Iskakova	Kazakhstan	2:23.32	

==== Final A ====
Competitors raced for positions 1 to 9, with medals going to the top three.

Rank	Canoeist	Country	Time	Notes
1st place, gold medalist(s)	Liudmyla Luzan	Ukraine	2:01.27	
2nd place, silver medalist(s)	Katie Vincent	Canada	2:02.50	
3rd place, bronze medalist(s)	María Corbera	Spain	2:04.73	
4	Réka Opavszky	Hungary	2:05.43	
5	Ma Yanan	China	2:05.66	
6	Olympia Della Giustina	Italy	2:06.84	
7	María Mailliard	Chile	2:07.98	
8	Daniela Cociu	Moldova	2:08.46	
9	Denisa Řáhová	Czech Republic	2:10.67	
