= 2022 ICF Canoe Sprint World Championships – Women's C-1 5000 metres =

Women's C-1 5000 metres at the 2022 ICF Canoe Sprint World Championships
- Venue: Lake Banook
- Location: Dartmouth, Canada
- Dates: 7 August
- Competitors: 10 from 10 nations
- Winning time: 27:50.88

Medalists
gold medal	Katie Vincent	Canada
silver medal	Annika Loske	Germany
bronze medal	María Corbera	Spain

The women's C-1 5000 metres competition at the 2022 ICF Canoe Sprint World Championships in Dartmouth took place on Lake Banook.

== Schedule ==
The schedule is as follows:

Date	Time	Round
Sunday 7 August 2022	15:50	Final

== Results ==
As a long-distance event, it was held as a direct final.

Rank	Canoeist	Country	Time
1st place, gold medalist(s)	Katie Vincent	Canada	27:50.88
2nd place, silver medalist(s)	Annika Loske	Germany	27:55.52
3rd place, bronze medalist(s)	María Corbera	Spain	28:02.52
4	Yarisleidis Duboys	Cuba	29:09.94
5	Magda Stanny	Poland	30:32.28
6	Paula Gómez	Chile	LAP
7	Audrey Harper	United States	LAP
	Virág Balla	Hungary	DNF
	Maria Olărașu	Moldova	DNF
