= 2021 ICF Canoe Sprint World Championships – Mixed C-2 200 metres =

Mixed C-2 200 metres at the 2021 ICF Canoe Sprint World Championships
- Venue: Lake Bagsværd
- Location: Copenhagen, Denmark
- Dates: 19 September
- Competitors: 18 from 9 nations
- Winning time: 39.10

Medalists
gold medal	Irina Andreeva; Ivan Shtyl	International Olympic Committee
silver medal	Michał Łubniewski; Dorota Borowska	Poland
bronze medal	Dávid Korisánszky; Kincső Takács	Hungary

The mixed C-2 200 metres competition at the 2021 ICF Canoe Sprint World Championships in Copenhagen took place on Lake Bagsværd.

== Schedule ==
The schedule was as follows:

Date	Time	Round
Sunday 19 September 2021	12:58	Final

All times are Central European Summer Time (UTC+2)

== Results ==
With fewer than ten boats entered, this event was held as a direct final.

Rank	Canoeists	Country	Time
1st place, gold medalist(s)	Irina Andreeva; Ivan Shtyl	RCF	39.10
2nd place, silver medalist(s)	Michał Łubniewski; Dorota Borowska	Poland	39.82
3rd place, bronze medalist(s)	Dávid Korisánszky; Kincső Takács	Hungary	40.02
4	Antía Jácome; Joan Moreno	Spain	40.88
5	Vitaliy Vergeles; Anastasiia Chetverikova	Ukraine	41.08
6	Nadzeya Makarchanka; Vitali Asetski	Belarus	41.26
7	Katie Vincent; Connor Fitzpatrick	Canada	41.33
8	Felix Gebhardt; Annika Loske	Germany	41.41
9	Lidia Sulaberidze; Aleksandre Tsivtsivadze	Georgia	41.79
