= 2023 ICF Canoe Sprint World Championships – Women's C-1 500 metres =

Women's C-1 500 metres at the 2023 ICF Canoe Sprint World Championships
- Venue: Sportpark Duisburg
- Location: Duisburg, Germany
- Dates: 24–27 August
- Competitors: 32 from 16 nations
- Winning time: 2:01.545

Medalists
gold medal	Katie Vincent	Canada
silver medal	María Corbera	Spain
bronze medal	María Mailliard	Chile

The women's C-1 500 metres competition at the 2023 ICF Canoe Sprint World Championships in Duisburg took place in Sportpark Duisburg.

== Schedule ==
The schedule is as follows:

Date	Time	Round
Thursday 24 August 2023	09:25	Heats
Saturday 26 August 2023	15:20	Semifinal
Sunday 27 August 2023	11:38	Final

== Results ==
=== Heats ===
The fastest three boats in each heat advanced directly to the final.
The next four fastest boats in each heat, plus the fastest remaining boat advanced to the semifinal.

==== Heat 1 ====
Rank	Canoeist	Country	Time	Notes
1	Mariya Brovkova	Kazakhstan	2:09.330	QF
2	Liudmyla Luzan	Ukraine	2:10.926	QF
3	María Mailliard	Chile	2:11.128	QF
4	Olympia Della Giustina	Italy	2:12.006	QS
5	Virág Balla	Hungary	2:12.011	QS
6	Maoli Angulo	Ecuador	2:25.144	QS
7	Neha Devi Leichonbam	India	2:28.286	QS
8	Combe Seck	Senegal	2:35.393	QS
9	Andreea Paraschiv	Moldova	2:46.035	

==== Heat 2 ====
Rank	Canoeist	Country	Time	Notes
1	Katie Vincent	Canada	2:09.377	QF
2	María Corbera	Spain	2:10.104	QF
3	Wan Yin	China	2:12.047	QF
4	Magda Stanny	Poland	2:13.594	QS
5	Nicol Guzmán	Mexico	2:15.423	QS
6	Audrey Harper	United States	2:19.272	QS
7	Manana Petriashvili	Georgia	2:33.094	QS
	Nedra Trabelsi	Tunisia	DNS	

=== Semifinal ===
The fastest three boats advanced to the final.

Rank	Canoeist	Country	Time	Notes
1	Virág Balla	Hungary	2:08.025	QF
2	Olympia Della Giustina	Italy	2:08.105	QF
3	Magda Stanny	Poland	2:10.193	QF
4	Nicol Guzmán	Mexico	2:14.280	
5	Audrey Harper	United States	2:15.459	
6	Neha Devi Leichonbam	India	2:22.911	
7	Maoli Angulo	Ecuador	2:23.102	
8	Manana Petriashvili	Georgia	2:27.298	
9	Combe Seck	Senegal	2:29.160	

=== Final ===
Competitors raced for positions 1 to 9, with medals going to the top three.

Rank	Canoeist	Country	Time
1st place, gold medalist(s)	Katie Vincent	Canada	2:01.545
2nd place, silver medalist(s)	María Corbera	Spain	2:02.860
3rd place, bronze medalist(s)	María Mailliard	Chile	2:03.218
4	Mariya Brovkova	Kazakhstan	2:08.444
5	Virág Balla	Hungary	2:09.522
6	Wan Yin	China	2:09.712
7	Olympia Della Giustina	Italy	2:11.773
8	Magda Stanny	Poland	2:16.670
	Liudmyla Luzan	Ukraine	DNS
