= Dorota Borowska =

Polish sprint canoeist (born 1996)

Personal information
- Nationality: Polish
- Born: 22 February 1996 (age 30) Nowy Dwór Mazowiecki, Poland
- Height: 1.70 m (5 ft 7 in)

Sport
- Country: Poland
- Sport: Canoe sprint
Medal record
Women's canoe sprint
Representing Poland
World Championships
Silver medal – second place	2018 Montemor-o-Velho	C-2 200 m
Silver medal – second place	2021 Copenhagen	C-2 Mix 200 m
Bronze medal – third place	2018 Montemor-o-Velho	C-1 200 m
Bronze medal – third place	2021 Copenhagen	C-1 200 m
Bronze medal – third place	2019 Minsk	C-1 200 m
European Championships
Gold medal – first place	2021 Poznań	C-1 200 m
Gold medal – first place	2024 Szeged	C-1 200 m
Gold medal – first place	2025 Racice	C-1 200 m
Silver medal – second place	2018 Belgrade	C-1 200 m
Silver medal – second place	2024 Szeged	C-2 200 m
Silver medal – second place	2024 Szeged	C-2 500 m
Bronze medal – third place	2026 Montemor-o-Velho	C-1 200 m
Bronze medal – third place	2026 Montemor-o-Velho	C-2 200 m
European Games
Gold medal – first place	2023 Kraków–Małopolska	C-1 200 m

Dorota Borowska (born 22 February 1996) is a Polish sprint canoeist.

She participated at the 2018 ICF Canoe Sprint World Championships.
