= Zhang Luqi =

Chinese canoeist

Personal information
- Nationality: Chinese
- Born: 17 October 1994 (age 31)

Sport
- Country: China
- Sport: Sprint canoe
- Event: C-2 200 m
Medal record
Women's canoe sprint
Representing China
World Championships
Gold medal – first place	2019 Szeged	C-2 200 m
Asian Championships
Gold medal – first place	2017 Shanghai	C-4 200 m

Zhang Luqi (born 17 October 1994) is a Chinese sprint canoeist.

She won a medal at the 2019 ICF Canoe Sprint World Championships.
