= 2023 ICF Canoe Sprint World Championships – Women's C-1 5000 metres =

Women's C-1 5000 metres at the 2023 ICF Canoe Sprint World Championships
- Venue: Sportpark Duisburg
- Location: Duisburg, Germany
- Dates: 27 August
- Competitors: 17 from 17 nations
- Winning time: 25:57.255

Medalists
| gold medal | Katie Vincent | Canada |
| silver medal | Zsófia Kisbán | Hungary |
| bronze medal | Li Li | China |

The women's C-1 5000 metres competition at the 2023 ICF Canoe Sprint World Championships in Duisburg took place in Sportpark Duisburg.

== Schedule ==
The schedule is as follows:

| Date | Time | Round |
|---|---|---|
| Sunday 27 August 2023 | 14:04 | Final |

== Results ==
As a long-distance event, it was held as a direct final.

| Rank | Canoeist | Country | Time |
|---|---|---|---|
| 1st place, gold medalist(s) | Katie Vincent | Canada | 25:57.255 |
| 2nd place, silver medalist(s) | Zsófia Kisbán | Hungary | 26:04.048 |
| 3rd place, bronze medalist(s) | Li Li | China | 26:51.612 |
| 4 | Annika Loske | Germany | 27:05.653 |
| 5 | Martina Malíková | Czech Republic | 27:08.536 |
| 6 | Eugénie Dorange | France | 27:15.839 |
| 7 | Elena Glizan | Moldova | 27:57.944 |
| 8 | Amelia Braun | Poland | 28:42.386 |
| 9 | Liudmyla Babak | Ukraine | 28:46.264 |
| 10 | Cristina Soutelo | Spain | 29:02.086 |
| 11 | Kaveri Dimar | India | 29:04.604 |
| 12 | Maoli Angulo | Ecuador | 29:26.531 |
| 13 | Anna Palmer | Great Britain | 29:28.746 |
| 14 | Audrey Harper | United States | 29:47.479 |
| | Rufina Iskakova | Kazakhstan | DNF |
| | Olympia Della Giustina | Italy | DNF |
| | Yurely Marín | Colombia | DNF |
| | Karen Roco | Chile | DNS |
| | Hiva Afzali | Iran | DNS |
