= Namita Chandel =

Indian canoeist

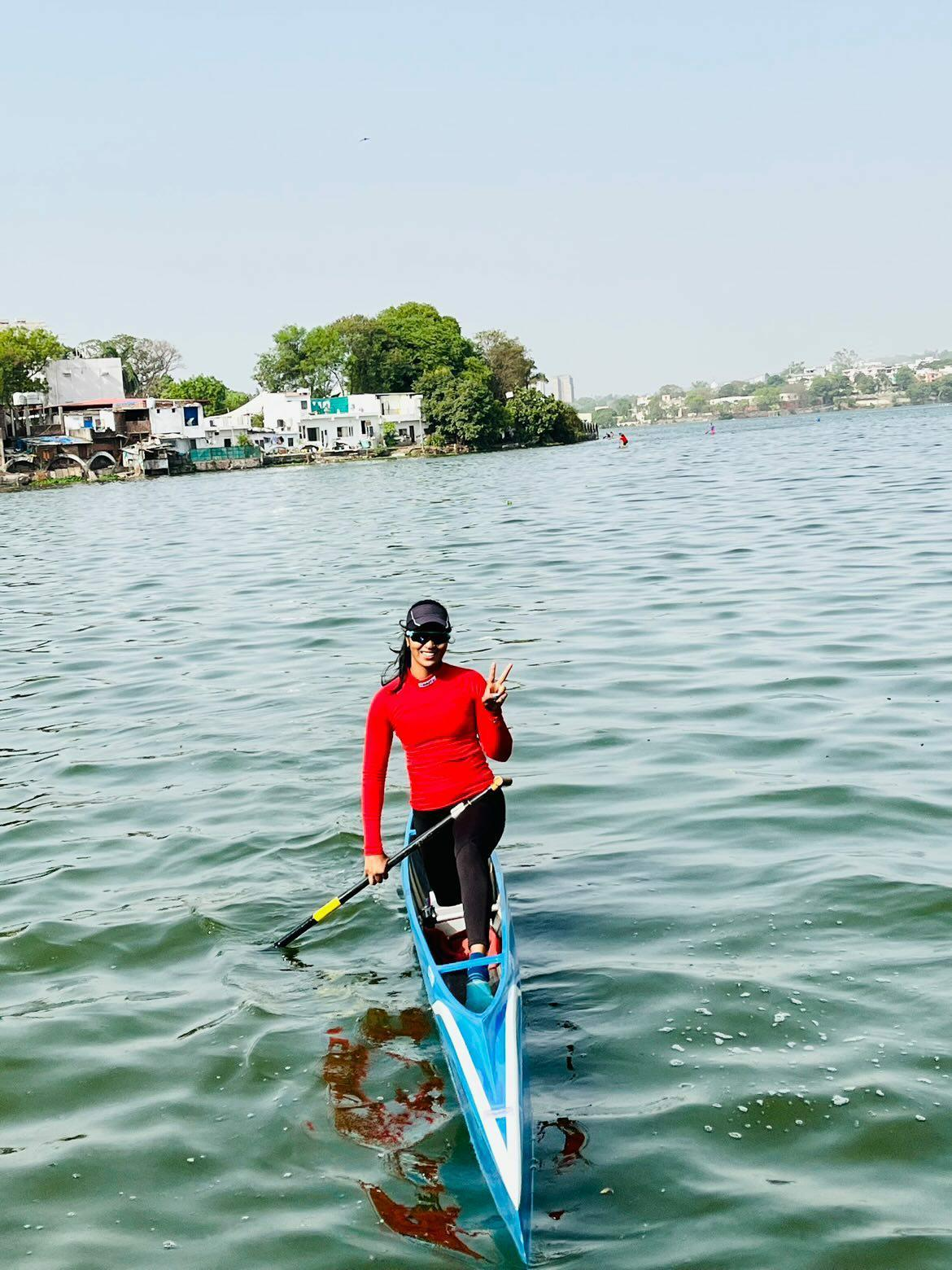

Personal information
- Nationality: India
- Born: 10 February 1993 (age 33) Seoni, Madhya Pradesh, India

Sport
- Country: India
- Sport: Canoe
Medal record
Women's sprint canoe
Representing India
Asian Championships
Bronze medal – third place	2022 Rayong	C-4 200 m

Namita Chandel (born 10 February 1993 in Seoni) is an Indian canoeist, who won four gold medals at the National Canoe Sprint Championship in 2016 and one in 2017. She represented India at the 2022 Asian Canoe Sprint Championships, where she was part of a bronze-winning team in the C-4 200m discipline.

== Early life ==
Namita Chandel is from Chhapara, a small village in Madhya Pradesh, who regularly had to cross a river to attend school. She enrolled in the Madhya Pradesh water sports academy, whose only admission criterion was that the applicants know swimming, in 2011.

== Career ==
Namita initially trained for kayaking but later switched to canoeing. She represented India in the 2014 Asian Games. She won her first international medal at the Asian Canoe Sprint and Dragon Boat Championship in Indonesia in 2015.

== Achievements ==
- Represented India, Obstacle Slalom, Asian Games, Incheon, 2014
- Silver medal, Mixed 200m, Asian Canoe Sprint & Dragon Boat Championship, Indonesia, 2015
- Gold medal, C-2 500m, National Canoe Sprint Championship, Bhopal, 2018
- Represented India, C-1 events, ICF Canoe Sprint World Championships, Szeged, 2019
- 4 x gold medals, C-4 (1000m, 500m, 200m) and C-2 (500m) events, National Canoe Sprint Championship, Bhopal, 2020
- 3 x gold medals, C-4 (500m) and C-2 (500m, 200m), National Canoe Sprint Championship, Bilaspur, 2021
- Gold medal - C-2 (5000m), 2 x Silver medals - C-2 (500m, 200m) and Bronze medal - C-4 (200m), National Canoe Sprint Championship, Bhopal, 2022
- Bronze medal, C-4 (200m), Asian Canoe Sprint Championships, Rayong, 2022
