= Ana María Ochoa =

Colombian ethnomusicologist (born 1962)

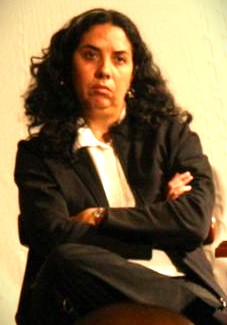
- Ochoa in 2008
- Born: 9 October 1962 (age 64); Medellín, Colombia
- Awards: Guggenheim Fellowship (2007)

Academic background
- Education: University of British Columbia; Indiana University
- Thesis: Plotting Musical Territories: Three Studies in Processes of Recontextualization of Musical Folklore in the Andean Region of Colombia (1997)

Academic work
- Discipline: Ethnomusicology
- Sub-discipline: Latin American music
- Institutions: Columbia University; Tulane University

Ana María Ochoa Gautier (born 9 October 1962) is a Colombian ethnomusicologist. A 2007 Guggenheim Fellow, she researches Latin American music – her works including Música Popular na America Latina: Pontos de Escuta (2007) and Aurality: Listening and Knowledge in Nineteenth-Century Colombia (2014) – and has worked as professor at Columbia University and Tulane University.

== Biography ==
Ana María Ochoa Gautier was born on 9 October 1962 in Medellín. She obtained her BM (1987) at the University of British Columbia, before obtaining her MA (1993) and PhD, (Note: Although her Tulane profile dates her PhD to 1993, her doctoral dissertation is dated to 1996 and Reports of the President and the Treasurer dates her PhD to 1997.) both in ethnomusicology and folklore, at Indiana University Bloomington; her doctoral dissertation was titled Plotting Musical Territories: Three Studies in Processes of Recontextualization of Musical Folklore in the Andean Region of Colombia. She later worked as a researcher at the music archives of the Ministry of Culture (1997–1999), Colombian Institute of Anthropology and History (1999–2001), and Centro Nacional de las Artes; (2001–2002). she was a postdoctoral fellow at New York University (NYU) in 2000.

Ochoa was an assistant professor of music at Columbia University from 2003 until 2005, when she moved to NYU with the same title. In 2008, she returned to Columbia as an associate professor, before being promoted to full professor in 2015 and serving as chair of the department of music from 2018 to 2021. That year, she moved to Tulane University and became professor.

Ochoa's ethnomusicological research is centered on Latin American music. In 2003, she wrote Entre los Deseos y los Derechos: Un Ensayo Crítico sobre Políticas Culturales (transl. Between Desires and Rights: A Critical Essay on Cultural Politics) and Músicas locales en tiempos de globalización (transl. Local Musics in the Age of Globalization). In 2007, she was awarded a Guggenheim Fellowship, and she and Martha Ulhôa co-edited the volume Música Popular na America Latina: Pontos de Escuta (transl. Popular Music in Latin America: Points of Listening). She won the 2015 Alan Merriam Prize for her 2014 book Aurality: Listening and Knowledge in Nineteenth-Century Colombia. At Tulane, she was the 2016 Distinguished Greenleaf Scholar in Residence Award and the 2022 Monroe Fellow.

== Bibliography ==
- (ed. with Martha Ulhôa) Música Popular na America Latina: Pontos de Escuta (2007)
- Aurality: Listening and Knowledge in Nineteenth-Century Colombia (2014)
