= María Corbera =

Spanish sprint canoeist (born 1991)

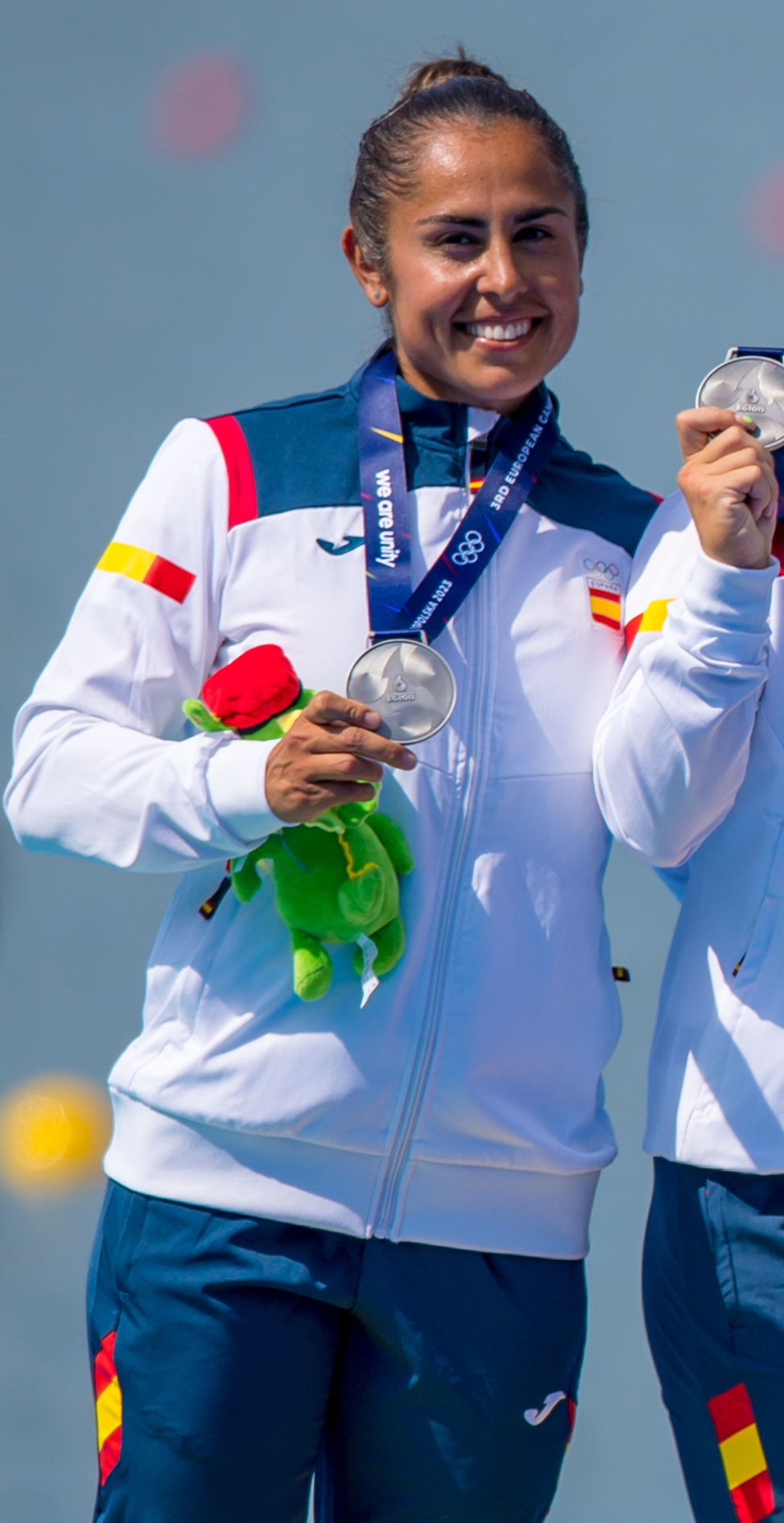

Personal information
- Full name: María Corbera Muñoz
- Nationality: Spanish
- Born: 20 November 1991 (age 34) Madrid, Spain

Sport
- Country: Spain
- Sport: Canoe sprint
- Club: Club Escuela de Piraguismo Aranjuez
Medal record
World Championships
| Gold medal – first place | 2021 Copenhagen | C-2 200 m |
| Silver medal – second place | 2022 Dartmouth | C-1 200 m |
| Silver medal – second place | 2023 Duisburg | C-1 500 m |
| Silver medal – second place | 2023 Duisburg | C-2 200 m |
| Silver medal – second place | 2023 Duisburg | C-2 500 m |
| Bronze medal – third place | 2022 Dartmouth | C-1 5000 m |
| Bronze medal – third place | 2025 Milan | C-1 500 m |
European Games
| Silver medal – second place | 2023 Kraków-Małopolska | C-1 500 m |
| Silver medal – second place | 2023 Kraków-Małopolska | C-2 500 m |
| Bronze medal – third place | 2023 Kraków-Małopolska | C-1 200 m |
European Championships
| Gold medal – first place | 2022 Munich | C-1 500 m |
| Gold medal – first place | 2022 Munich | C-1 5000 m |
| Gold medal – first place | 2024 Szeged | C-2 200 m |
| Silver medal – second place | 2022 Munich | C-2 200 m |
| Bronze medal – third place | 2024 Szeged | C-1 500 m |

María Corbera Muñoz (Note: In this Spanish name, the first or paternal surname is Corbera and the second or maternal family name is Muñoz.) (born 20 November 1991) is a Spanish sprint canoeist.

She competed at the 2021 ICF Canoe Sprint World Championships, winning a gold medal in the C-2 200 m distance. On 19 August 2022, she won the race of 1500 m C1 in Munich of the European Championships.
