= Alena Nazdrova =

Belarusian canoeist

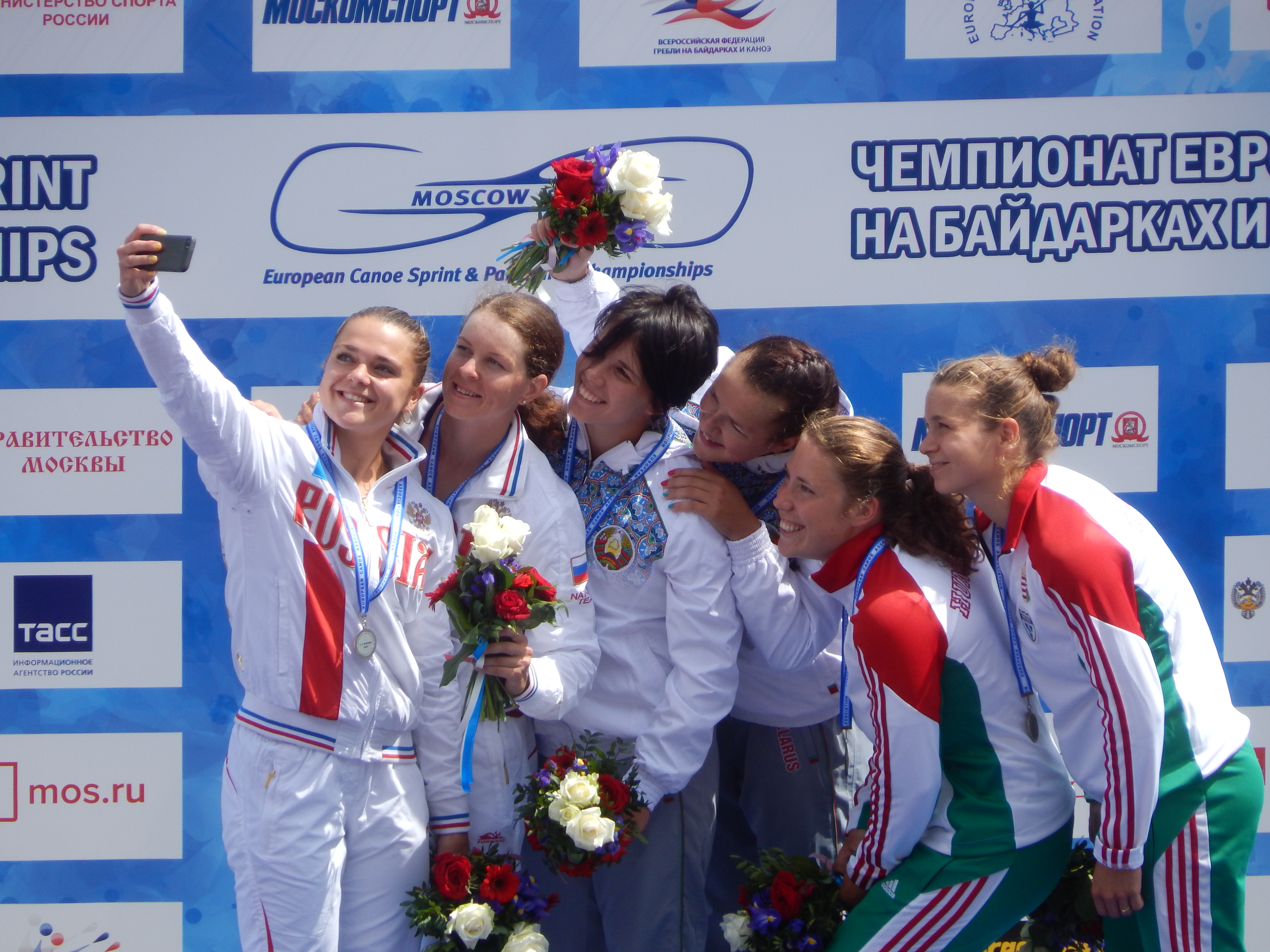
- Nazdrova in 2016

Personal information
- Full name: Alena Piatrouna Nazdrova
- Nationality: Belarusian
- Born: 10 November 1998 (age 27) Udoha, Mahilyow, Belarus
- Height: 1.71 m (5 ft 7 in)

Sport
- Country: Belarus
- Sport: Canoe sprint
Medal record
Women's canoe sprint
Representing Belarus
World Championships
Gold medal – first place	2018 Montemor-o-Velho	C-2 200 m
Gold medal – first place	2019 Szeged	C-1 500 m
Gold medal – first place	2021 Copenhagen	C-4 500 m
Silver medal – second place	2018 Montemor-o-Velho	C-1 500 m
Silver medal – second place	2021 Copenhagen	C-2 500 m
Bronze medal – third place	2017 Račice	C-2 500 m
Bronze medal – third place	2018 Montemor-o-Velho	C-1 200 m
Bronze medal – third place	2019 Szeged	C-1 200 m
Bronze medal – third place	2021 Copenhagen	C-1 500 m
Bronze medal – third place	2026 Poznań	C-1 500 m
European Games
Gold medal – first place	2019 Minsk	C-1 200 m
European Championships
Gold medal – first place	2016 Moscow	C-2 500 m
Gold medal – first place	2018 Belgrade	C-1 500 m
Silver medal – second place	2017 Plovdiv	C-2 500 m
Silver medal – second place	2018 Belgrade	C-2 200 m
Bronze medal – third place	2017 Plovdiv	C-1 200 m
Bronze medal – third place	2021 Poznań	C-1 500 m
Representing ANA
World Championships
Gold medal – first place	2024 Samarkand	C-1 1000 m
European Championships
Gold medal – first place	2024 Szeged	C-1 500 m

Alena Piatrouna Nazdrova (Belarusian: Алена Пятроўна Наздрова; born 10 November 1998) is a Belarusian sprint canoeist.

She participated at the 2018 ICF Canoe Sprint World Championships.

== Major results ==
=== Olympic Games ===
Year	C-1 200
2020	3 FB

=== World championships ===
Year	C-1 200	C-1 500	C-1 1000	C-2 200	C-2 500	C-4 500
2017	4	—N/a	—N/a	—N/a	3rd place, bronze medalist(s)	—N/a
2018	3rd place, bronze medalist(s)	2nd place, silver medalist(s)	—N/a	1st place, gold medalist(s)		—N/a
2019	3rd place, bronze medalist(s)	1st place, gold medalist(s)	—N/a			—N/a
2021	7	3rd place, bronze medalist(s)	—N/a		2nd place, silver medalist(s)	1st place, gold medalist(s)
2024	—N/a	4	1st place, gold medalist(s)	7	—N/a	—N/a
