= Staniliya Stamenova =

Bulgarian canoeist (born 1988)

Medal record

Women's canoe sprint

Representing Bulgaria

World Championships
Gold medal – first place	2015 Milan	C-1 200 m
Silver medal – second place	2013 Duisburg	C-1 200 m
Silver medal – second place	2014 Moscow	C-1 200 m
Bronze medal – third place	2011 Szeged	C-1 200 m

European Championships
Gold medal – first place	2012 Zagreb	C-1 200 m
Gold medal – first place	2014 Brandenburg	C-1 200 m
Gold medal – first place	2015 Račice	C-1 200 m
Silver medal – second place	2013 Montemor-o-Velho	C-1 200 m

Staniliya Stamenova (Bulgarian: Станилия Стаменова) (born 2 June 1988) is a Bulgarian sprint canoer and former athletics competitor. She won the gold medal in the C-1 200 m event at the 2015 ICF Canoe Sprint World Championships in Milan and has won the gold in the same event at the Canoe Sprint European Championships three times, in 2012, 2014, and 2015.
