= Valdenice Conceição =

Brazilian canoeist (born 1989)

Personal information
- Full name: Valdenice Conceição do Nascimento
- Born: 16 October 1989 (age 37) Itacaré, Bahia, Brazil
- Height: 1.60 m (5 ft 3 in)

Sport
- Country: Brazil
- Sport: Canoe sprint
- Event: C1 200 m
- Club: Associação de Canoagem de Itacaré
Medal record
Women's canoe sprint
Representing Brazil
World Championships
| Bronze medal – third place | 2014 Moscow | C-1 200 m |
Pan American Games
| Bronze medal – third place | 2015 Toronto | C-1 200 m |
South American Games
| Gold medal – first place | 2026 Santa Fe | C-1 200 m |
| Gold medal – first place | 2026 Santa Fe | Mixed C-2 500 m |
| Silver medal – second place | 2026 Santa Fe | C-1 500 m |
| Silver medal – second place | 2026 Santa Fe | C-2 500 m |

Valdenice Conceição do Nascimento (born 16 October 1989) is a Brazilian sprint canoeist.

== Career ==
Bronze medalist at the 2015 Pan American Games in the C-1 200 m, Conceição is part of the Itacaré Canoeing Association, which revealed the main talents in the category in Brazil. She was the first Brazilian athlete to get a place in the 2024 Summer Olympics.
