= Katie Reid (canoeist) =

British sprint canoeist

Personal information
- Born: 26 February 1995 (age 31) Kircaldy, Scotland, UK
- Height: 172 cm (5 ft 8 in)
- Weight: 70 kg (154 lb)

Sport
- Sport: Canoe sprint
Medal record
Representing Great Britain

Katie Reid (born 1995) is a British sprint canoeist. She qualified to compete at the 2020 Summer Olympics in the women's C-1 200 metres race.

Reid was born in Kirkcaldy, Scotland and was a Scottish karate champion before joining the Girls4Gold scheme to train as a sprint canoeist.

On 8 July 2021 Reid was selected for the British canoe sprint squad for the 2020 Olympics in Tokyo.
