= Vanesa Tot =

Croatian canoeist

Personal information
- Nationality: Croatian
- Born: 12 July 1999 (age 27)
- Height: 1.61 m (5 ft 3 in)

Sport
- Sport: Sprint kayak
Medal record
Representing Croatia
Women's canoe sprint
European Championships
| Bronze medal – third place | 2022 Munich | C-1 200 m |
| Bronze medal – third place | 2022 Munich | C-1 500 m |
Mediterranean Games
| Silver medal – second place | 2026 Taranto | C-1 200 m |
Women's canoe marathon
European Championships
| Silver medal – second place | 2018 Metković | C-1 |

Vanesa Tot (born 12 July 1999) is a Croatian canoeist. She represented Croatia at the 2020 Summer Olympics competing in women's C-1 200 metres.
