= 2019 ICF Canoe Sprint World Championships – Women's C-2 200 metres =

Women's C-2 200 metres at the 2019 ICF Canoe Sprint World Championships
- Venue: Olympic Centre of Szeged
- Location: Szeged, Hungary
- Dates: 23–25 August
- Competitors: 28 from 14 nations
- Winning time: 44.69

Medalists
gold medal	Lin Wenjun; Zhang Luqi	China
silver medal	Kincső Takács; Virág Balla	Hungary
bronze medal	Dilnoza Rakhmatova; Nilufar Zokirova	Uzbekistan

The women's C-2 200 metres competition at the 2019 ICF Canoe Sprint World Championships in Szeged took place at the Olympic Centre of Szeged.

== Schedule ==
The schedule was as follows:

Date	Time	Round
Friday 23 August 2019	11:35	Heats
Saturday 24 August 2019	16:45	Semifinal
Sunday 25 August 2019	12:29	Final

All times are Central European Summer Time (UTC+2)

== Results ==
=== Heats ===
The fastest three boats in each heat advanced directly to the final.
The next four fastest boats in each heat, plus the fastest remaining boat advanced to the semifinal.

==== Heat 1 ====
Rank	Canoeists	Country	Time	Notes
1	Lin Wenjun; Zhang Luqi	China	42.04	QF
2	Kincső Takács; Virág Balla	Hungary	43.39	QF
3	Maria Olărașu; Daniela Cociu	Moldova	44.30	QF
4	Liudmyla Luzan; Anastasiia Chetverikova	Ukraine	44.44	QS
5	Ana Ochoa; Manuela Gómez	Colombia	45.44	QS
6	Ann Marie Armstrong; Lia Gaetano	United States	52.87	QS

==== Heat 2 ====
Rank	Canoeists	Country	Time	Notes
1	Dilnoza Rakhmatova; Nilufar Zokirova	Uzbekistan	42.89	QF
2	Daria Kharchenko; Kseniia Kurach	Russia	44.65	QF
3	Volha Klimava; Nadzeya Makarchanka	Belarus	44.83	QF
4	Riska Andriyani; Nurmeni	Indonesia	46.04	QS
5	Julia Walczak; Sylwia Szczerbińska	Poland	46.27	QS
6	Jong Ye-song; Cha Un-yong	North Korea	47.19	QS
7	Combe Seck; Oulimata Fall	Senegal	51.77	QS
8	Aarti Nath; Neetu Verma	India	52.31	qS

=== Semifinal ===
The fastest three boats advanced to the final.

Rank	Canoeists	Country	Time	Notes
1	Liudmyla Luzan; Anastasiia Chetverikova	Ukraine	45.28	QF
2	Ana Ochoa; Manuela Gómez	Colombia	46.05	QF
3	Riska Andriyani; Nurmeni	Indonesia	46.33	QF
4	Julia Walczak; Sylwia Szczerbińska	Poland	46.55	
5	Jong Ye-song; Cha Un-yong	North Korea	47.17	
6	Combe Seck; Oulimata Fall	Senegal	51.19	
7	Ann Marie Armstrong; Lia Gaetano	United States	52.34	
8	Aarti Nath; Neetu Verma	India	53.96	

=== Final ===
Competitors raced for positions 1 to 9, with medals going to the top three.

Rank	Canoeists	Country	Time
1st place, gold medalist(s)	Lin Wenjun; Zhang Luqi	China	44.69
2nd place, silver medalist(s)	Kincső Takács; Virág Balla	Hungary	45.16
3rd place, bronze medalist(s)	Dilnoza Rakhmatova; Nilufar Zokirova	Uzbekistan	46.60
4	Volha Klimava; Nadzeya Makarchanka	Belarus	46.81
5	Daria Kharchenko; Kseniia Kurach	Russia	47.77
6	Liudmyla Luzan; Anastasiia Chetverikova	Ukraine	47.85
7	Ana Ochoa; Manuela Gómez	Colombia	48.52
8	Maria Olărașu; Daniela Cociu	Moldova	48.55
9	Riska Andriyani; Nurmeni	Indonesia	49.97
