= 2021 ICF Canoe Sprint World Championships – Women's C-2 500 metres =

Women's C-2 500 metres at the 2021 ICF Canoe Sprint World Championships
- Venue: Lake Bagsværd
- Location: Copenhagen, Denmark
- Dates: 16–18 September
- Competitors: 28 from 14 nations
- Winning time: 1:55.85

Medalists
gold medal	Liudmyla Luzan; Anastasiia Chetverikova	Ukraine
silver medal	Alena Nazdrova; Nadzeya Makarchanka	Belarus
bronze medal	Yarisleidis Cirilo; Katherin Nuevo	Cuba

The women's C-2 500 metres competition at the 2021 ICF Canoe Sprint World Championships in Copenhagen took place on Lake Bagsværd.

== Schedule ==
The schedule was as follows:

Date	Time	Round
Thursday 16 September 2021	10:00	Heats
Thursday 16 September 2021	16:35	Semifinal
Saturday 18 September 2021	11:08	Final

All times are Central European Summer Time (UTC+2)

== Results ==
=== Heats ===
The fastest three boats in each heat advanced directly to the final.
The next four fastest boats in each heat, plus the fastest remaining boat advanced to the semifinal.

==== Heat 1 ====
Rank	Canoeists	Country	Time	Notes
1	Liudmyla Luzan; Anastasiia Chetverikova	Ukraine	2:00.63	QF
2	Alena Nazdrova; Nadzeya Makarchanka	Belarus	2:00.87	QF
3	Sylwia Szczerbińska; Aleksandra Jacewicz	Poland	2:02.01	QF
4	Yarisleidis Cirilo; Katherin Nuevo	Cuba	2:03.26	QS
5	Arina Khozhainova; Daria Kharchenko	RCF	2:05.11	QS
6	Martina Malíková; Jana Zetek	Czech Republic	2:21.80	QS
7	Daniela Cociu; Maria Olărașu	Moldova	2:25.40	QS

==== Heat 2 ====
Rank	Canoeists	Country	Time	Notes
1	Virág Balla; Kincső Takács	Hungary	2:03.70	QF
2	Anna Cyr; Sophia Jensen	Canada	2:03.93	QF
3	Antía Otero; Antía Jácome	Spain	2:05.37	QF
4	Laura Ruiz; Eugénie Dorange	France	2:06.70	QS
5	Karen Roco; María Mailliard	Chile	2:07.00	QS
6	Bethany Gill; Afton Fitzhenry	Great Britain	2:11.42	QS
–	Li Wei; Li Qi	China	DNS	

=== Semifinal ===
The fastest three boats advanced to the final.

Rank	Canoeists	Country	Time	Notes
1	Yarisleidis Cirilo; Katherin Nuevo	Cuba	2:04.44	QF
2	Daniela Cociu; Maria Olărașu	Moldova	2:05.36	QF
3	Arina Khozhainova; Daria Kharchenko	RCF	2:05.58	QF
4	Karen Roco; María Mailliard	Chile	2:06.53	
5	Laura Ruiz; Eugénie Dorange	France	2:07.07	
6	Bethany Gill; Afton Fitzhenry	Great Britain	2:09.24	
7	Martina Malíková; Jana Zetek	Czech Republic	2:14.00	

=== Final ===
Competitors raced for positions 1 to 9, with medals going to the top three.

Rank	Canoeists	Country	Time
1st place, gold medalist(s)	Liudmyla Luzan; Anastasiia Chetverikova	Ukraine	1:55.85
2nd place, silver medalist(s)	Alena Nazdrova; Nadzeya Makarchanka	Belarus	1:57.12
3rd place, bronze medalist(s)	Yarisleidis Cirilo; Katherin Nuevo	Cuba	1:57.70
4	Virág Balla; Kincső Takács	Hungary	1:57.77
5	Sylwia Szczerbińska; Aleksandra Jacewicz	Poland	1:58.74
6	Anna Cyr; Sophia Jensen	Canada	1:58.92
7	Arina Khozhainova; Daria Kharchenko	RCF	2:01.08
8	Antía Otero; Antía Jácome	Spain	2:01.19
9	Daniela Cociu; Maria Olărașu	Moldova	2:03.02
