= 2024 ICF Canoe Sprint World Championships – Women's C-2 200 metres =

Women's C-2 200 metres at the 2024 ICF Canoe Sprint World Championships
- Venue: Rowing and Canoeing Race Course in Samarkand
- Location: Samarkand, Uzbekistan
- Dates: 24–25 August
- Competitors: 22 from 11 nations
- Winning time: 43.053

Medalists
gold medal	Yuliya Trushkina; Inna Nedelkina	Individual Neutral Athletes
silver medal	Daniela Cociu; Maria Olărașu	Moldova
bronze medal	Xu Shengnan; Xiang Jingjing	China

The women's C-2 200 metres competition at the 2024 ICF Canoe Sprint World Championships in Samarkand took place in Rowing and Canoeing Race Course in Samarkand.

== Schedule ==
The schedule is as follows:

Date	Time	Round
Saturday 24 August 2024	09:30	Heats
Saturday 24 August 2024	16:20	Semifinal
Sunday 25 August 2024	14:16	Final A

== Results ==
=== Heats ===
The fastest three boats in each heat advanced directly to the final.
The next four fastest boats in each heat, plus the fastest remaining boat advanced to the semifinal

==== Heat 1 ====
Rank	Canoeist	Country	Time	Notes
1	Yuliya Trushkina; Inna Nedelkina	Individual Neutral Athletes	44.102	QF
2	Xu Shengnan; Xiang Jingjing	China	45.747	QF
3	Viktoriia Yarchevska; Elena Gómez-Millán	Spain	46.298	QF
4	María Mailliard; Paula Gómez	Chile	47.115	QS
5	Dinara Dzhuraeva; Nilufar Zokirova	Uzbekistan	48.885	QS
6	Masuma Yadav; Deepa Rajput	India	54.153	QS

==== Heat 2 ====
Rank	Canoeist	Country	Time	Notes
1	Daniela Cociu; Maria Olărașu	Moldova	44.368	QF
2	Marina Gureeva; Alina Kovaleva	Individual Neutral Athletes	45.012	QF
3	Dóra Horányi; Kincső Takács	Hungary	46.085	QF
4	Margarita Torlopova; Ulyana Kisseleva	Kazakhstan	48.256	QS
	Liudmyla Luzan; Valeriia Tereta	Ukraine	DSQ	

=== Semifinal ===
The fastest three boats advanced to the A final.

Rank	Canoeist	Country	Time	Notes
1	Margarita Torlopova; Ulyana Kisseleva	Kazakhstan	45.885	QF
2	María Mailliard; Paula Gómez	Chile	46.458	QF
3	Dinara Dzhuraeva; Nilufar Zokirova	Uzbekistan	47.474	QF
4	Masuma Yadav; Deepa Rajput	India	53.068	

=== Final ===
Competitors raced for positions 1 to 9, with medals going to the top three.

Rank	Canoeist	Country	Time
1st place, gold medalist(s)	Yuliya Trushkina; Inna Nedelkina	Individual Neutral Athletes	43.053
2nd place, silver medalist(s)	Daniela Cociu; Maria Olărașu	Moldova	44.104
3rd place, bronze medalist(s)	Xu Shengnan; Xiang Jingjing	China	44.664
4	Marina Gureeva; Alina Kovaleva	Individual Neutral Athletes	44.995
5	Dóra Horányi; Kincső Takács	Hungary	45.314
6	Viktoriia Yarchevska; Elena Gómez-Millán	Spain	45.639
7	María Mailliard; Paula Gómez	Chile	46.507
8	Margarita Torlopova; Ulyana Kisseleva	Kazakhstan	46.957
9	Dinara Dzhuraeva; Nilufar Zokirova	Uzbekistan	47.928
