= 2018 ICF Canoe Sprint World Championships – Women's C-2 500 metres =

Women's C-2 500 metres at the 2018 ICF Canoe Sprint World Championships
- Venue: Centro de Alto Rendimento de Montemor-o-Velho
- Location: Montemor-o-Velho, Portugal
- Dates: 24–26 August
- Competitors: 40 from 20 nations
- Winning time: 1:56.395

Medalists
| gold medal | Laurence Vincent-Lapointe; Katie Vincent | Canada |
| silver medal | Virág Balla; Kincső Takács | Hungary |
| bronze medal | Nadzeya Makarchanka; Volha Klimava | Belarus |

The women's C-2 500 metres competition at the 2018 ICF Canoe Sprint World Championships in Montemor-o-Velho took place at the Centro de Alto Rendimento de Montemor-o-Velho.

== Schedule ==
The schedule was as follows:

| Date | Time | Round |
|---|---|---|
| Friday 24 August 2018 | 18:06 | Heats |
| Saturday 25 August 2018 | 17:30 | Semifinals |
| Sunday 26 August 2018 | 13:02 | Final A |
| Sunday 26 August 2018 | 13:50 | Final B |

All times are Western European Summer Time (UTC+1)

== Results ==
=== Heats ===
Heat winners advanced directly to the A final. The next six fastest boats in each heat advanced to the semifinals.

==== Heat 1 ====
| Rank | Canoeists | Country | Time | Notes |
|---|---|---|---|---|
| 1 | Laurence Vincent-Lapointe; Katie Vincent | Canada | 1:59.752 | QA |
| 2 | Lisa Jahn; Sophie Koch | Germany | 2:06.026 | QS |
| 3 | Liudmyla Luzan; Anastasiia Chetverikova | Ukraine | 2:08.096 | QS |
| 4 | Katie Reid; Chloe Bracewell | Great Britain | 2:09.489 | QS |
| 5 | Ana Ochoa; Manuela Gómez | Colombia | 2:10.866 | QS |
| 6 | Andrea Oliveira; Angela Silva | Brazil | 2:16.853 | QS |
| 7 | Lucia Valová; Gabriela Ladičová | Slovakia | 2:17.010 | QS |

==== Heat 2 ====
| Rank | Canoeists | Country | Time | Notes |
|---|---|---|---|---|
| 1 | Irina Andreeva; Olesia Romasenko | Russia | 2:04.541 | QA |
| 2 | Eugénie Dorange; Flore Caupain | France | 2:06.601 | QS |
| 3 | Alexandra Dragomirescu; Adina Cale | Romania | 2:07.584 | QS |
| 4 | Belén Díaz; María Corbera | Spain | 2:10.641 | QS |
| 5 | Maria Olarasu; Daniela Cociu | Moldova | 2:11.945 | QS |
| 6 | Márcia Faria; Beatriz Lamas | Portugal | 2:25.935 | QS |
| 7 | Oulimata Fall; Combe Seck | Senegal | 2:29.096 | QS |

==== Heat 3 ====
| Rank | Canoeists | Country | Time | Notes |
|---|---|---|---|---|
| 1 | Karen Roco; María Mailliard | Chile | 2:04.710 | QA |
| 2 | Xu Shixiao; Xu Zheyi | China | 2:05.396 | QS |
| 3 | Virág Balla; Kincső Takács | Hungary | 2:05.403 | QS |
| 4 | Nadzeya Makarchanka; Volha Klimava | Belarus | 2:08.496 | QS |
| 5 | Lenka Součková; Jana Ježová | Czech Republic | 2:11.670 | QS |
| 6 | Aleksandra Jacewicz; Magda Stanny | Poland | 2:16.037 | QS |

=== Semifinals ===
Qualification was as follows:

The fastest three boats in each semi advanced to the A final. The next four fastest boats in each semi, plus the fastest remaining boat advanced to the B final.

==== Semifinal 1 ====
| Rank | Canoeists | Country | Time | Notes |
|---|---|---|---|---|
| 1 | Nadzeya Makarchanka; Volha Klimava | Belarus | 2:03.563 | QA |
| 2 | Xu Shixiao; Xu Zheyi | China | 2:04.417 | QA |
| 3 | Liudmyla Luzan; Anastasiia Chetverikova | Ukraine | 2:09.414 | QA |
| 4 | Ana Ochoa; Manuela Gómez | Colombia | 2:14.991 | QB |
| 5 | Belén Díaz; María Corbera | Spain | 2:15.827 | QB |
| 6 | Andrea Oliveira; Angela Silva | Brazil | 2:18.214 | QB |
| 7 | Alexandra Dragomirescu; Adina Cale | Romania | 2:19.114 | QB |
| 8 | Márcia Faria; Beatriz Lamas | Portugal | 2:32.238 | |

==== Semifinal 2 ====
| Rank | Canoeists | Country | Time | Notes |
|---|---|---|---|---|
| 1 | Virág Balla; Kincső Takács | Hungary | 2:06.002 | QA |
| 2 | Eugénie Dorange; Flore Caupain | France | 2:07.222 | QA |
| 3 | Lisa Jahn; Sophie Koch | Germany | 2:07.236 | QA |
| 4 | Katie Reid; Chloe Bracewell | Great Britain | 2:08.666 | QB |
| 5 | Lenka Součková; Jana Ježová | Czech Republic | 2:11.509 | QB |
| 6 | Aleksandra Jacewicz; Magda Stanny | Poland | 2:12.863 | QB |
| 7 | Lucia Valová; Gabriela Ladičová | Slovakia | 2:15.976 | QB |
| 8 | Maria Olarasu; Daniela Cociu | Moldova | 2:16.016 | qB |
| 9 | Oulimata Fall; Combe Seck | Senegal | 2:31.337 | |

=== Finals ===
==== Final B ====
Competitors in this final raced for positions 10 to 18.

| Rank | Canoeists | Country | Time |
|---|---|---|---|
| 1 | Aleksandra Jacewicz; Magda Stanny | Poland | 2:10.016 |
| 2 | Belén Díaz; María Corbera | Spain | 2:10.733 |
| 3 | Katie Reid; Chloe Bracewell | Great Britain | 2:12.529 |
| 4 | Alexandra Dragomirescu; Adina Cale | Romania | 2:13.366 |
| 5 | Lenka Součková; Jana Ježová | Czech Republic | 2:13.483 |
| 6 | Andrea Oliveira; Angela Silva | Brazil | 2:15.026 |
| 7 | Lucia Valová; Gabriela Ladičová | Slovakia | 2:15.993 |
| 8 | Ana Ochoa; Manuela Gómez | Colombia | 2:17.073 |
| 9 | Maria Olarasu; Daniela Cociu | Moldova | 2:18.346 |

==== Final A ====
Competitors in this final raced for positions 1 to 9, with medals going to the top three.

| Rank | Canoeists | Country | Time |
|---|---|---|---|
| 1st place, gold medalist(s) | Laurence Vincent-Lapointe; Katie Vincent | Canada | 1:56.395 |
| 2nd place, silver medalist(s) | Virág Balla; Kincső Takács | Hungary | 1:58.632 |
| 3rd place, bronze medalist(s) | Nadzeya Makarchanka; Volha Klimava | Belarus | 2:00.485 |
| 4 | Irina Andreeva; Olesia Romasenko | Russia | 2:02.279 |
| 5 | Xu Shixiao; Xu Zheyi | China | 2:02.579 |
| 6 | Lisa Jahn; Sophie Koch | Germany | 2:03.352 |
| 7 | Eugénie Dorange; Flore Caupain | France | 2:04.912 |
| 8 | Liudmyla Luzan; Anastasiia Chetverikova | Ukraine | 2:04.935 |
| 9 | Karen Roco; María Mailliard | Chile | 2:11.696 |
