= 2026 ICF Canoe Sprint World Championships – Women's C-2 200 metres =

Women's C-2 200 metres at the 2026 ICF Canoe Sprint World Championships
- Venue: Lake Malta
- Location: Poznań, Poland
- Dates: 26–29 August
- Competitors: 28 from 14 nations
- Winning time: 42.26

Medalists
gold medal	Yuliya Trushkina; Inna Nedelkina	Individual Neutral Athletes
silver medal	Shokhsanam Sherzodova; Nilufar Zokirova	Uzbekistan
bronze medal	Shuai Changwen; Lin Wenjun	China

The women's C-2 200 metres competition at the 2026 ICF Canoe Sprint World Championships in Poznań, Poland took place between 27 and 30 August 2026.

== Records ==
The world best time in the C-2 200 metres for women at the beginning of the competition was as follows:

Women's C-2 200 metres
World Best	41.53	Cuba (CUB); Yarisleidis Cirilo; Yinnoly López	Szeged (Hungary)

== Schedule ==
The schedule is as follows:

Date	Time	Round
Wednesday 26 August 2026	16:29	Heats
Friday 28 August 2026	11:07	Semifinals
Saturday 29 August 2026	16:06	Final A

== Results ==
=== Heats ===
Four heats were held on afternoon of 26 August 2026.

Qualification rule : the first three boats in each heat advanced straight to the final, the remaining boats advanced to the semi final.

Heat 1

Rank	Lane	Name(s)	Nation	Time	Behind	Notes
1	5	Àngels Moreno; Viktoriia Yarchevska	Spain	46.66		FA
2	6	Shokhsanam Sherzodova; Nilufar Zokirova	Uzbekistan	47.44	+0.78	FA
3	4	Shuai Changwen; Lin Wenjun	China	47.48	+0.82	FA
4	3	Sloan MacKenzie; Élizabeth Desrosiers-McArthur	Canada	48.11	+1.45	SF
5	7	Elizaveta Somova; Ekaterina Shliapnikova	Neutral Athletes A	48.26	+1.60	SF
6	2	Radostina Angelova; Hanna Ivanova	Bulgaria	51.23	+4.57	SF
7	8	Teresa Chianane; Neuzia Banze	Mozambique	1:04.68	+18.02	SF

Heat 2

Rank	Lane	Name(s)	Nation	Time	Behind	Notes
1	3	Yuliya Trushkina; Inna Nedelkina	Neutral Athletes B	46.15		FA
2	5	Liudmyla Luzan; Anastasiia Rybachok	Ukraine	46.24	+0.09	FA
3	8	Mariya Brovkova; Ulyana Kisseleva	Kazakhstan	46.61	+0.46	FA
4	6	Réka Opavszky; Dóra Horányi	Hungary	47.24	+1.09	SF
5	7	Kaja Lach; Amelia Sołtyńska	Poland	48.46	+2.31	SF
6	4	Elena Glizan; Daniela Cociu	Moldova	49.07	+2.92	SF
7	2	Asmaa Asaad Mabrouk Aly; Gana Ahmed Abdelaziz Morsy	Egypt	58.59	+12.44	SF

=== Semi final ===
Three semi finals were held on morning of 28 August 2026.

Qualification rule : First three boats qualified for the final, the remainder are eliminated

Rank	Lane	Name(s)	Nation	Time	Behind	Notes
1	4	Réka Opavszky; Dóra Horányi	Hungary	47.33		FA
2	5	Sloan MacKenzie; Élizabeth Desrosiers-McArthur	Canada	47.52	+0.19	FA
3	6	Elizaveta Somova; Ekaterina Shliapnikova	Neutral Athletes A	48.51	+1.18	FA
4	3	Kaja Lach; Amelia Sołtyńska	Poland	49.44	+2.11	
5	2	Radostina Angelova; Hanna Ivanova	Bulgaria	53.32	+5.99	
6	7	Elena Glizan; Daniela Cociu	Moldova	56.08	+8.75	
7	8	Teresa Chianane; Neuzia Banze	Mozambique	1:03.63	+16.30	
8	8	Maria Olărașu	Moldova	51.65	+6.34	
	1	Asmaa Asaad Mabrouk Aly; Gana Ahmed Abdelaziz Morsy	Egypt	DNS		

=== Finals ===
The Final was held on the afternoon of 29 August.

Rank	Lane	Name(s)	Nation	Time	Behind	Notes
1st place, gold medalist(s)	4	Yuliya Trushkina; Inna Nedelkina	Neutral Athletes B	42.26		
2nd place, silver medalist(s)	3	Shokhsanam Sherzodova; Nilufar Zokirova	Uzbekistan	42.52	+0.26	
3rd place, bronze medalist(s)	7	Shuai Changwen; Lin Wenjun	China	42.65	+0.39	
4	5	Àngels Moreno; Viktoriia Yarchevska	Spain	42.97	+0.71	
5	6	Liudmyla Luzan; Anastasiia Rybachok	Ukraine	43.04	+0.78	
6	1	Sloan MacKenzie; Élizabeth Desrosiers-McArthur	Canada	43.29	+1.03	
7	8	Réka Opavszky; Dóra Horányi	Hungary	43.37	+1.11	
8	9	Elizaveta Somova; Ekaterina Shliapnikova	Neutral Athletes A	43.50	+1.24	
9	2	Mariya Brovkova; Ulyana Kisseleva	Kazakhstan	43.99	+1.73	
