= 2018 European Junior and U23 Canoe Sprint Championships =

2018 European Junior & U23 Canoe Sprint Championships
- Venue: Auronzo Lake
- Location: Auronzo di Cadore, Italy
- Start date: 28 June
- End date: 1 July
- Competitors: 687 from 33 nations

The 2018 European Junior & U23 Canoe Sprint Championships was the 7th edition of the European Junior & U23 Canoe Sprint Championships, an international canoe and kayak sprint event organised by the European Canoe Association, and was held in Auronzo di Cadore, Italy, between 28 June and 1 July.

== Medal overview ==
=== Under 23 ===
==== Men ====
Event	Gold	Time	Silver	Time	Bronze	Time
C-1 200 m	Vadim Korobov (LTU)	40.054	Carlo Tacchini (ITA) Artem Pron (RUS)	40.714	none awarded	
C-1 1000 m	Carlo Tacchini (ITA)	3:52.096	Leonid Carp (ROU)	3:53.390	Vadim Korobov (LTU)	3:53.996
C-2 500 m	Belarus; Vladislav Lukashuk; Aliaksei Matusevich	1:42.128	Ukraine; Taras Mazovskyi; Denys Filatov	1:42.645	Moldova; Ilie Oprea; Oleg Nuţă	1:42.768
C-2 1000 m	Romania; Cătălin Chirilă; Ştefan Strat	3:34.517	Belarus; Vladislav Lukashuk; Ivan Patapenka	3:35.084	Spain; Noel Domínguez; Gonzalo Martin	3:36.124
K-1 200 m	Andrea Di Liberto (ITA)	34.988	Artūras Seja (LTU)	35.264	Roberts Akmens (LAT)	35.564
K-1 500 m	Oleh Kukharyk (UKR)	1:39.373	Artuur Peters (BEL)	1:40.220	Jakub Zavřel (CZE)	1:40.690
K-1 1000 m	Artuur Peters (BEL)	3:33.726	Amund Vold (NOR)	3:33.853	Oleh Kukharyk (UKR)	3:33.893
K-2 1000 m	Slovakia; Samuel Baláž; Tibor Linka	3:13.454	Italy; Luca Beccaro; Tommaso Freschi	3:14.460	Belarus; Dzmitry Levanchuk; Uladzislau Sukhanosau	3:15.567
K-4 500 m	Slovakia; Samuel Baláž; Csaba Zalka; Milan Fraňa; Tibor Linka	1:20.468	Belarus; Aliaksei Misiuchenka; Yury Tkachou; Kiril Nikitsin; Ilya Fedarenka	1:21.328	Ukraine; Dmytro Danylenko; Dmytro Kostyshen; Daniil Kuzmin; Denys Lakhmanov	1:21.548

==== Women ====
Event	Gold	Time	Silver	Time	Bronze	Time
C-1 200 m	Volha Klimava (BLR)	49.745	Dorota Borowska (POL)	50.028	Afton Fitzhenry (GBR)	50.965
C-1 500 m	Liudmyla Luzan (UKR)	2:13.619	Mariam Kerdikashvili (GEO)	2:16.469	Eugénie Dorange (FRA)	2:17.135
C-2 200 m	Poland; Sylwia Szczerbińska; Dorota Borowska	46.425	Belarus; Natallia Trukhanovich; Iryna Vikhruk	47.615	Russia; Kseniia Kurach; Olesya Nikiforova	48.071
C-2 500 m	Belarus; Nadzeya Makarchanka; Volha Klimava	1:56.389	Russia; Aliia Almakaeva; Daria Kharchenko	1:59.598	Ukraine; Liudmyla Luzan; Anastasiia Chetverikova	2:01.038
K-1 200 m	Biljana Relić (SRB)	40.769	Adrienn Orosz (HUN)	41.116	Dominika Włodarczyk (POL)	41.356
K-1 500 m	Pernille Knudsen (DEN)	1:54.893	Helena Wiśniewska (POL)	1:55.239	Noémi Pupp (HUN)	1:55.306
K-1 1000 m	Blanka Bordács (HUN)	3:59.710	Paulina Paszek (POL)	3:59.750	Rebeka Simon (GBR)	4:01.266
K-2 500 m	Poland; Justyna Iskrzycka; Paulina Paszek	1:43.136	Serbia; Marija Dostanić; Biljana Relić	1:46.006	Denmark; Line Langelund; Bolette Nyvang	1:46.436
K-4 500 m	Poland; Dominika Włodarczyk; Helena Wiśniewska; Klaudia Cyrulewska; Katarzyna Kołodziejczyk	1:33.615	Hungary; Noémi Lucz; Dóra Sólyom; Blanka Kiss; Zsófia Szénási	1:34.125	Denmark; Pernille Knudsen; Line Langelund; Julie Funch; Bolette Nyvang	1:35.784

=== Junior ===
==== Men ====
Event	Gold	Time	Silver	Time	Bronze	Time
C-1 200 m	Dmytro Ozymok (UKR)	41.491	Vitali Asetski (BLR)	41.567	Nikita Nekrasov (RUS)	41.701
C-1 1000 m	Arcadii Goncearov (MDA)	4:08.142	Manuel Fontán (ESP)	4:09.075	Ádám Kocsis (HUN)	4:09.675
C-2 1000 m	Czech Republic; Jiří Minařík; Jiří Zalubil	3:45.842	Belarus; Aliaksandr Hatalski; Vitali Asetski	3:46.798	Russia; Sergei Nemov; Kirill Romanov	3:48.218
C-4 500 m	Ukraine; Dmytro Ozymok; Pavlo Semeniuk; Oleksandr Yatsiuk; Illia Sharhorodskyi	1:35.668	Russia; Sergei Nemov; Mikhail Egorov; Kirill Romanov; Artem Piskun	1:37.185	Romania; Cristian Baccela; Angelo Mercur; Alexandru Pătrașcu; Răzvan Băţăgui	1:37.231
K-1 200 m	Bartosz Grabowski (POL)	36.238	Matúš Jedinák (SVK)	36.565	Yurii Zub (UKR)	37.205
K-1 500 m	Rasmus Knudsen (DEN)	1:39.304	Bojan Zdelar (SRB)	1:40.977	Jan Vorel (CZE)	1:41.357
K-1 1000 m	Rasmus Knudsen (DEN)	3:40.027	Anton Novak (BLR)	3:41.947	Moritz Wehlend (GER)	3:42.207
K-2 1000 m	Belarus; Kiryl Smalianik; Uladzislau Litvinau	3:22.693	Czech Republic; Vilém Kukačka; Jan Vorel	3:22.726	Germany; Mauritz Hennies; Elias Kurth	3:23.423
K-4 500 m	Belarus; Kiryl Smalianik; Anton Novak; Uladzislau Litvinau; Yauheni Liabik	1:24.589	Russia; Danil Vetrov; Dmitrii Ivanik; Artem Korovin; Dmitrii Morgunov Germany; Mauritz Hennies; Moritz Wehlend; Max Korehnke; Elias Kurth	1:25.276	none awarded	

==== Women ====
Event	Gold	Time	Silver	Time	Bronze	Time
C-1 200 m	Anastasiia Vazhinskaia (RUS)	51.377	Lucia Valová (SVK)	51.573	Denisa Řáhová (CZE)	52.000
C-1 500 m	Lucia Valová (SVK)	2:13.720	Olga Aleksandrova (RUS)	2:13.820	Denisa Řáhová (CZE)	2:16.830
C-2 200 m	Belarus; Aliaksandra Kalaur; Anastasiya Zhuk	47.003	France; Laura Ruiz; Flore Caupain	47.211	Moldova; Maria Olărașu; Daniela Cociu	47.683
C-2 500 m	France; Laura Ruiz; Flore Caupain	2:04.426	Moldova; Maria Olărașu; Daniela Cociu	2:04.486	Russia; Angelina Gubanova; Olga Aleksandrova	2:05.725
K-1 200 m	Ina Sauchuk (BLR)	2:01.115	Netta Gábor (HUN)	2:01.867	Julia Olszewska (POL)	2:02.275
K-1 500 m	Ina Sauchuk (BLR)	1:54.631	Emma Russell (GBR)	1:55.698	Sandra Ostrowska (POL)	1:56.198
K-1 1000 m	Laura Pleşca (ROU)	4:10.025	Sofie Kinclová (CZE)	4:10.381	Helene Fabrin-Brasted (DEN)	4:11.048
K-2 500 m	Denmark; Katrine Jensen; Sara Milthers	1:45.383	Czech Republic; Štěpánka Sobíšková; Barbora Galádová	1:45.703	Poland; Julia Wieczorek; Julia Olszewska	1:46.323
K-4 500 m	Czech Republic; Štěpánka Sobíšková; Sofie Kinclová; Kateřina Zárubová; Barbora Galádová	1:36.499	Hungary; Zsófia Potoniec; Anna Máró; Réka Posta; Zsóka Csikós	1:36.959	Russia; Anastasiia Dolgova; Victoria Krupnova; Anna Panfilova; Kristina Mange	1:38.565
