= Canoe sprint at the 2019 European Games – Women's C-2 500 metres =

Women's C-2 500 metres at the 2019 European Games
- Venue: Zaslavl Regatta Course
- Date: 25–27 June
- Competitors: 26 from 13 nations
- Winning time: 2:11.129

Medalists
gold medal	Virág Balla; Kincső Takács	Hungary
silver medal	Nadzeya Makarchanka; Volha Klimava	Belarus
bronze medal	Kseniia Kurach; Olesia Romasenko	Russia

The women's C-2 500 metres canoe sprint competition at the 2019 European Games in Minsk took place between 25 and 27 June at the Zaslavl Regatta Course.

== Schedule ==
The schedule was as follows:

Date	Time	Round
Tuesday 25 June 2019	14:25	Heats
Tuesday 25 June 2019	17:15	Semifinal
Thursday 27 June 2019	10:50	Final

All times are Further-eastern European Time (UTC+3)

== Results ==
=== Heats ===
The fastest three boats in each heat advanced directly to the final. The next four fastest boats in each heat, plus the fastest remaining boat advanced to the semifinal.

==== Heat 1 ====
Rank	Canoeists	Country	Time	Notes
1	Virág Balla; Kincső Takács	Hungary	1:56.132	QF, GB
2	Lisa Jahn; Ophelia Preller	Germany	1:57.082	QF
3	Liudmyla Luzan; Anastasiia Chetverikova	Ukraine	1:57.467	QF
4	Eugénie Dorange; Flore Caupain	France	2:02.154	QS
5	Sylwia Szczerbińska; Magda Stanny	Poland	2:02.289	QS
6	Lenka Jandová; Jana Ježová	Czech Republic	2:07.182	QS
7	María Pérez; Raquel Da Costa	Spain	2:10.549	QS

==== Heat 2 ====
Rank	Canoeists	Country	Time	Notes
1	Kseniia Kurach; Olesia Romasenko	Russia	1:56.355	QF
2	Nadzeya Makarchanka; Volha Klimava	Belarus	1:58.125	QF
3	Daniela Cociu; Maria Olărașu	Moldova	2:01.075	QF
4	Katie Reid; Chloe Bracewell	Great Britain	2:01.988	QS
5	Tania Virijac; Livia Căle	Romania	2:05.988	QS
6	Lucia Valová; Hana Mikéciová	Slovakia	2:09.133	QS

=== Semifinal ===
The fastest three boats advanced to the final.

Rank	Canoeists	Country	Time	Notes
1	Sylwia Szczerbińska; Magda Stanny	Poland	2:01.196	QF
2	Katie Reid; Chloe Bracewell	Great Britain	2:01.939	QF
3	Eugénie Dorange; Flore Caupain	France	2:03.771	QF
4	Lenka Jandová; Jana Ježová	Czech Republic	2:04.846	
5	Tania Virijac; Livia Căle	Romania	2:08.014	
6	Lucia Valová; Hana Mikéciová	Slovakia	2:08.139	
7	María Pérez; Raquel Da Costa	Spain	2:09.171	

=== Final ===
Competitors in this final raced for positions 1 to 9, with medals going to the top three.

Rank	Canoeists	Country	Time
1st place, gold medalist(s)	Virág Balla; Kincső Takács	Hungary	2:11.129
2nd place, silver medalist(s)	Nadzeya Makarchanka; Volha Klimava	Belarus	2:12.924
3rd place, bronze medalist(s)	Kseniia Kurach; Olesia Romasenko	Russia	2:14.194
4	Lisa Jahn; Ophelia Preller	Germany	2:14.789
5	Liudmyla Luzan; Anastasiia Chetverikova	Ukraine	2:15.044
6	Sylwia Szczerbińska; Magda Stanny	Poland	2:15.997
7	Eugénie Dorange; Flore Caupain	France	2:21.359
8	Daniela Cociu; Maria Olărașu	Moldova	2:24.674
9	Katie Reid; Chloe Bracewell	Great Britain	2:27.344
