= 2024 ICF Canoe Sprint World Championships – Mixed C-2 500 metres =

Mixed C-2 500 metres at the 2024 ICF Canoe Sprint World Championships
- Venue: Rowing and Canoeing Race Course in Samarkand
- Location: Samarkand, Uzbekistan
- Dates: 23–25 August
- Competitors: 28 from 14 nations
- Winning time: 43.053

Medalists
gold medal	Alexey Korovashkov; Ekaterina Shliapnikova	Individual Neutral Athletes
silver medal	Kincső Takács; Jonatán Hajdu	Hungary
bronze medal	Uladzislau Paleshko; Inna Nedelkina	Individual Neutral Athletes

The mixed C-2 500 metres competition at the 2024 ICF Canoe Sprint World Championships in Samarkand took place in Rowing and Canoeing Race Course in Samarkand.

== Schedule ==
The schedule is as follows:

Date	Time	Round
Friday 23 August 2024	16:36	Heats
Friday 23 August 2024	17:52	Semifinal
Sunday 25 August 2024	12:35	Final A

== Results ==
=== Heats ===
The fastest three boats in each heat advanced directly to the final.
The next four fastest boats in each heat, plus the fastest remaining boat advanced to the semifinal

==== Heat 1 ====
Rank	Canoeist	Country	Time	Notes
1	Mihai Chihaia; Maria Olărașu	Moldova	1:48.672	QF
2	Sergey Yemelyanov; Rufina Iskakova	Kazakhstan	1:49.211	QF
3	Uladzislau Paleshko; Inna Nedelkina	Individual Neutral Athletes	1:50.032	QF
4	Kincső Takács; Jonatán Hajdu	Hungary	1:50.573	QS
5	Kim Yi-yeol; Lee Ye-lin	South Korea	2:12.420	QS
6	Firdavs Sharipov; Komila Pirnazarova	Tajikistan	2:15.545	QS
7	Arvind Verma; Deepa Rajput	India	2:16.014	QS

==== Heat 2 ====
Rank	Canoeist	Country	Time	Notes
1	Alexey Korovashkov; Ekaterina Shliapnikova	Individual Neutral Athletes	1:51.160	QF
2	Nico Pickert; Annika Loske	Germany	1:51.840	QF
3	Elyorjon Mamadaliev; Nilufar Zokirova	Uzbekistan	1:52.850	QF
4	Alejandro Rodríguez; Manuela Gómez	Colombia	1:53.152	QS
5	Mei Chao; Yang Li	China	1:54.066	QS
6	Noel Domínguez; Elena Gómez-Millán	Spain	2:08.471	QS
7	Anastasiia Rybachok; Andrii Rybachok	Ukraine	2:09.140	QS

=== Semifinal ===
The fastest three boats advanced to the A final.

Rank	Canoeist	Country	Time	Notes
1	Kincső Takács; Jonatán Hajdu	Hungary	1:54.865	QF
2	Mei Chao; Yang Li	China	1:55.144	QF
3	Alejandro Rodríguez; Manuela Gómez	Colombia	1:55.171	QF
4	Anastasiia Rybachok; Andrii Rybachok	Ukraine	1:55.331	
5	Noel Domínguez; Elena Gómez-Millán	Spain	1:55.974	
6	Arvind Verma; Deepa Rajput	India	2:12.423	
7	Firdavs Sharipov; Komila Pirnazarova	Tajikistan	2:25.931	
8	Kim Yi-yeol; Lee Ye-lin	South Korea	2:30.529	

=== Final ===
Competitors raced for positions 1 to 9, with medals going to the top three.

Rank	Canoeist	Country	Time
1st place, gold medalist(s)	Alexey Korovashkov; Ekaterina Shliapnikova	Individual Neutral Athletes	1:47.898
2nd place, silver medalist(s)	Kincső Takács; Jonatán Hajdu	Hungary	1:48.693
3rd place, bronze medalist(s)	Uladzislau Paleshko; Inna Nedelkina	Individual Neutral Athletes	1:49.343
4	Mihai Chihaia; Maria Olărașu	Moldova	1:49.424
5	Elyorjon Mamadaliev; Nilufar Zokirova	Uzbekistan	1:50.365
6	Alejandro Rodríguez; Manuela Gómez	Colombia	1:50.454
7	Mei Chao; Yang Li	China	1:51.085
8	Sergey Yemelyanov; Rufina Iskakova	Kazakhstan	1:57.812
	Nico Pickert; Annika Loske	Germany	DNS
