= 2026 ICF Canoe Sprint World Championships – Women's C-2 500 metres =

Women's C-2 500 metres at the 2026 ICF Canoe Sprint World Championships
- Venue: Lake Malta
- Location: Poznań, Poland
- Dates: 26–28 August
- Competitors: 44 from 22 nations
- Winning time: 2:01.65

Medalists
gold medal	Carlotta Loske; Maike Jakob	Germany
silver medal	Liudmyla Luzan; Anastasiia Rybachok	Ukraine
bronze medal	Anhelina Bardanouskaya; Inna Nedelkina	Individual Neutral Athletes

The women's C-2 500 metres competition at the 2026 ICF Canoe Sprint World Championships in Poznań, Poland took place between 26 and 28 August 2026.

== Records ==
The world best time in the C-2 500 metres for women at the beginning of the competition was as follows:

Women's C-2 500 metres
World Best	1:51.42	Canada (CAN); Laurence Vincent Lapointe; Katie Vincent	Duisburg (Germany)

== Schedule ==
The schedule is as follows:

Date	Time	Round
Wednesday 26 August 2026	10:13	Heats
Thursday 27 August 2026	14:24	Semifinals
Friday 28 August 2026	14:41	Final B
Friday 28 August 2026	15:18	Final A

== Results ==
=== Heats ===
The results of the heats of the C-2 500 metres women event were as follows:

Qualification rule : the first boat in each heat advanced straight to the final, the next six fastest boats in each heat advanced to the semi final.

Heat 1

Rank	Lane	Name(s)	Nation	Time	Behind	Notes
1	5	Àngels Moreno; Viktoriia Yarchevska	Spain	2:02.88		FA
2	6	Shokhsanam Sherzodova; Nilufar Zokirova	Uzbekistan	2:04.18	+1.30	SF
3	4	Zoe Wojtyk; Katie Vincent	Canada	2:04.56	+1.68	SF
4	3	Elizaveta Somova; Ekaterina Shliapnikova	Neutral Athletes A	2:08.36	+5.48	SF
5	7	Amelia Marcinkowska; Maja Ruzanowska	Poland	2:11.11	+8.23	SF
6	2	Denisa Řáhová; Kamila Šímová	Czech Republic	2:11.12	+8.24	SF
7	8	Radostina Angelova; Hanna Ivanova	Bulgaria	2:21.39	+18.51	SF
8	8	Teresa Chianane; Neuzia Banze	Mozambique	2:40.59	+37.71	

Heat 2

Rank	Lane	Name(s)	Nation	Time	Behind	Notes
1	3	Liudmyla Luzan; Anastasiia Rybachok	Ukraine	2:03.03		FA
2	5	Carlotta Loske; Maike Jakob	Germany	2:04.47	+1.44	SF
3	8	Sun Mengya; Ma Yanan	China	2:04.63	+1.60	SF
4	6	Mariya Brovkova; Ulyana Kisseleva	Kazakhstan	2:07.17	+4.14	SF
5	7	Beatriz Fernandes; Inês Penetra	Portugal	2:10.30	+7.27	SF
6	4	Megha Pradeep; Neha Devi Leichonbam	India	2:23.87	+20.84	SF
7	2	Asmaa Asaad Mabrouk Aly; Gana Ahmed Abdelaziz Morsy	Egypt	2:35.38	+32.35	SF

Heat 3

Rank	Lane	Name(s)	Nation	Time	Behind	Notes
1	5	Ágnes Kiss; Bianka Nagy	Hungary	2:08.49		FA
2	4	Audrey Harper; Andreea Ghizila	United States	2:11.24	+2.75	SF
3	3	María Mailliard; Paula Beatriz Gómez	Chile	2:12.71	+4.22	SF
4	7	Anhelina Bardanouskaya; Inna Nedelkina	Neutral Athletes A	2:13.61	+5.12	SF
5	6	Elena Glizan; Daniela Cociu	Moldova	2:24.88	+16.39	SF
6	8	Combe Seck; Mame Thiane Diarra	Senegal	2:47.69	+39.20	SF
	2	Dayumin Dayumin; Sella Monim	Indonesia	DNS		

=== Semi final ===
The results of the semifinals of the C-2 500 metres women event were as follows:

Qualification rule : First three boats qualified for the final, the next four fastest boats in each semi and best 8th advanced to the final B.

Semifinal 1

Rank	Lane	Name(s)	Nation	Time	Behind	Notes
1	4	Sun Mengya; Ma Yanan	China	2:03.98		FA
2	3	Anhelina Bardanouskaya; Inna Nedelkina	Neutral Athletes A	2:04.71	+0.73	FA
3	5	Shokhsanam Sherzodova; Nilufar Zokirova	Uzbekistan	2:06.58	+2.60	FA
4	7	Elizaveta Somova; Ekaterina Shliapnikova	Neutral Athletes A	2:07.57	+3.59	FB
5	2	Denisa Řáhová; Kamila Šímová	Czech Republic	2:09.66	+5.68	FB
6	6	María Mailliard; Paula Beatriz Gómez	Chile	2:10.57	+6.59	FB
7	2	Beatriz Fernandes; Inês Penetra	Portugal	2:10.63	+6.65	FB
8	9	Asmaa Asaad Mabrouk Aly; Gana Ahmed Abdelaziz Morsy	Egypt	2:31.68	+27.70	
9	8	Combe Seck; Mame Thiane Diarra	Senegal	2:41.38	+37.40	

Semifinal 2

Rank	Lane	Name(s)	Nation	Time	Behind	Notes
1	5	Carlotta Loske; Maike Jakob	Germany	2:07.27		FA
2	6	Zoe Wojtyk; Katie Vincent	Canada	2:08.22	+0.95	FA
3	2	Elena Glizan; Daniela Cociu	Moldova	2:10.14	+2.87	FA
4	4	Audrey Harper; Andreea Ghizila	United States	2:11.14	+3.87	FB
5	3	Mariya Brovkova; Ulyana Kisseleva	Kazakhstan	2:11.68	+4.41	FB
6	7	Amelia Marcinkowska; Maja Ruzanowska	Poland	2:15.10	+7.83	FB
7	8	Megha Pradeep; Neha Devi Leichonbam	India	2:26.14	+18.87	FB
8	1	Radostina Angelova; Hanna Ivanova	Bulgaria	2:28.10	+20.83	qBT

=== Finals ===
The results of the finals in the women's C-2 500 metres were as follows:

Final B

Rank	Lane	Name(s)	Nation	Time	Behind	Notes
1	6	Mariya Brovkova; Ulyana Kisseleva	Kazakhstan	2:08.21		
2	5	Elizaveta Somova; Ekaterina Shliapnikova	Neutral Athletes A	2:09.60	+1.39	
3	4	Audrey Harper; Andreea Ghizila	United States	2:09.90	+1.69	
4	7	María Mailliard; Paula Beatriz Gómez	Chile	2:11.73	+3.52	
5	3	Denisa Řáhová; Kamila Šímová	Czech Republic	2:11.86	+3.65	
6	1	Beatriz Fernandes; Inês Penetra	Portugal	2:11.93	+3.72	
7	2	Amelia Marcinkowska; Maja Ruzanowska	Poland	2:13.52	+5.31	
8	9	Radostina Angelova; Hanna Ivanova	Bulgaria	2:15.93	+7.72	
9	8	Megha Pradeep; Neha Devi Leichonbam	India	2:19.12	+10.91	

Final A

Rank	Lane	Name(s)	Nation	Time	Behind	Notes
1st place, gold medalist(s)	7	Carlotta Loske; Maike Jakob	Germany	2:01.65		
2nd place, silver medalist(s)	4	Liudmyla Luzan; Anastasiia Rybachok	Ukraine	2:02.28	+0.63	
3rd place, bronze medalist(s)	8	Anhelina Bardanouskaya; Inna Nedelkina	Neutral Athletes A	2:02.67	+1.02	
4	3	Sun Mengya; Ma Yanan	China	2:03.50	+1.85	
5	5	Àngels Moreno; Viktoriia Yarchevska	Spain	2:03.55	+1.90	
6	9	Elena Glizan; Daniela Cociu	Moldova	2:04.22	+2.57	
7	6	Ágnes Kiss; Bianka Nagy	Hungary	2:04.36	+2.71	
8	2	Zoe Wojtyk; Katie Vincent	Canada	2:06.44	+4.79	
9	1	Shokhsanam Sherzodova; Nilufar Zokirova	Uzbekistan	2:09.76	+8.11	
