= 2025 ICF Canoe Sprint World Championships – Women's C-2 200 metres =

Women's C-2 200 metres at the 2025 ICF Canoe Sprint World Championships
- Venue: Idroscalo Regatta Course
- Location: Milan, Italy
- Dates: 20–23 August
- Competitors: 28 from 14 nations
- Winning time: 41.87

Medalists
gold medal	Liudmyla Luzan; Iryna Fedoriv	Ukraine
silver medal	Yuliya Trushkina; Inna Nedelkina	Individual Neutral Athletes
bronze medal	Audrey Harper; Andreea Ghizila	United States

The women's C-2 200 metres competition at the 2025 ICF Canoe Sprint World Championships in Milan took place in Idroscalo Regatta Course.

== Schedule ==
The schedule is as follows:

Date	Time	Round
Wednesday 20 August 2025	15:08	Heats
Friday 22 August 2025	11:23	Semifinals
Saturday 23 August 2025	15:30	Final A

== Results ==
=== Heats ===
The fastest three boats in each heat advanced directly to the final.
The next four fastest boats in each heat, plus the fastest remaining boat advanced to the semifinal

==== Heat 1 ====
Rank	Canoeist	Country	Time	Notes
1	Liudmyla Luzan; Iryna Fedoriv	Ukraine	42.30	FA
2	Ágnes Kiss; Bianka Nagy	Hungary	42.88	FA
3	Audrey Harper; Andreea Ghizila	United States	43.25	FA
4	Shokhsanam Sherzodova; Nilufar Zokirova	Uzbekistan	43.47	QS
5	Marina Gureeva; Ekaterina Shliapnikova	Individual Neutral Athletes	43.54	QS
6	Teng Anshuo; Jiang Xina	China	43.57	QS
7	Elena Gómez-Millán; Claudia Couto	Spain	44.47	QS
8	Madison Velásquez; Manuela Gómez	Colombia	44.55	qS

==== Heat 2 ====
Rank	Canoeist	Country	Time	Notes
1	Yuliya Trushkina; Inna Nedelkina	Individual Neutral Athletes	43.44	FA
2	Sloan MacKenzie; Sophia Jensen	Canada	43.91	FA
3	Daniela Cociu; Maria Olărașu	Moldova	44.10	FA
4	Herlin Aprilin Lali; Sella Monim	Indonesia	44.23	QS
5	Sylwia Szczerbińska; Dorota Borowska	Poland	44.39	QS
6	Barbara Jara; Karen Roco	Chile	47.45	QS
	Lealyn Baligasa; Joanna Barca	Philippines	DNS	

=== Semifinal ===
The fastest three boats iadvanced to the A final.

Rank	Canoeist	Country	Time	Notes
1	Teng Anshuo; Jiang Xina	China	44.35	FA
2	Sylwia Szczerbińska; Dorota Borowska	Poland	44.41	FA
3	Marina Gureeva; Ekaterina Shliapnikova	Individual Neutral Athletes	44.52	FA
4	Elena Gómez-Millán; Claudia Couto	Spain	44.71	
5	Madison Velásquez; Manuela Gómez	Colombia	45.31	
6	Shokhsanam Sherzodova; Nilufar Zokirova	Uzbekistan	45.54	
7	Herlin Aprilin Lali; Sella Monim	Indonesia	46.55	
8	Barbara Jara; Karen Roco	Chile	46.89	

=== Final ===
Competitors raced for positions 1 to 9, with medals going to the top three.

Rank	Canoeist	Country	Time	Notes
1st place, gold medalist(s)	Liudmyla Luzan; Iryna Fedoriv	Ukraine	41.87	
2nd place, silver medalist(s)	Yuliya Trushkina; Inna Nedelkina	Individual Neutral Athletes	42.59	
3rd place, bronze medalist(s)	Audrey Harper; Andreea Ghizila	United States	42.78	
4	Marina Gureeva; Ekaterina Shliapnikova	Individual Neutral Athletes	42.92	
5	Ágnes Kiss; Bianka Nagy	Hungary	43.11	
6	Daniela Cociu; Maria Olărașu	Moldova	43.16	
7	Sloan MacKenzie; Sophia Jensen	Canada	43.29	
8	Teng Anshuo; Jiang Xina	China	43.36	
9	Sylwia Szczerbińska; Dorota Borowska	Poland	43.87	
