= 2025 ICF Canoe Sprint World Championships – Women's C-1 200 metres =

Women's C-1 200 metres at the 2025 ICF Canoe Sprint World Championships
- Venue: Idroscalo Regatta Course
- Location: Milan, Italy
- Dates: 21–24 August
- Competitors: 30 from 30 nations
- Winning time: 46.09

Medalists
| gold medal | Liudmyla Luzan | Ukraine |
| silver medal | Yarisleidis Cirilo | Cuba |
| bronze medal | Ekaterina Shliapnikova | Individual Neutral Athletes |

The women's C-1 200 metres competition at the 2025 ICF Canoe Sprint World Championships in Milan took place in Idroscalo Regatta Course.

== Schedule ==
The schedule is as follows:

| Date | Time | Round |
|---|---|---|
| Thursday 21 August 2025 | 09:00 | Heats |
| Saturday 23 August 2025 | 09:40 | Semifinals |
| Sunday 24 August 2025 | 09:35 | Final B |
| Sunday 24 August 2025 | 10:04 | Final A |

== Results ==
=== Heats ===
The fastest six fastest boats (QS) in each heat plus the fastest three remaining boats (qs), advanced to the semi-finals.

==== Heat 1 ====
| Rank | Canoeist | Country | Time | Notes |
|---|---|---|---|---|
| 1 | Liudmyla Luzan | Ukraine | 46.04 | QS |
| 2 | Yuliya Trushkina | Individual Neutral Athletes | 47.26 | QS |
| 3 | Sun Mengya | China | 47.74 | QS |
| 4 | Dorota Borowska | Poland | 47.87 | QS |
| 5 | Olympia Della Giustina | Italy | 48.24 | QS |
| 6 | Megha Pradeep | India | 51.30 | QS |
| 7 | Teruko Kiriake | Japan | 51.72 | |
| 8 | Tamara Pavić | Bosnia and Herzegovina | 1:03.98 | |

==== Heat 2 ====
| Rank | Canoeist | Country | Time | Notes |
|---|---|---|---|---|
| 1 | Katie Vincent | Canada | 46.54 | QS |
| 2 | Viktoriia Yarchevska | Spain | 46.83 | QS |
| 3 | Valdenice Conceição | Brazil | 47.50 | QS |
| 4 | Nilufar Zokirova | Uzbekistan | 48.85 | QS |
| 5 | Audrey Harper | United States | 48.88 | QS |
| 6 | María Mailliard | Chile | 49.63 | QS |
| 7 | Tetiana Smylovenko | Azerbaijan | 49.65 | qS |
| 8 | Julija Jevtušenkaitė | Lithuania | 50.01 | |

==== Heat 3 ====
| Rank | Canoeist | Country | Time | Notes |
|---|---|---|---|---|
| 1 | Yarisleidis Cirilo | Cuba | 46.66 | QS |
| 2 | Elena Glizan | Moldova | 47.57 | QS |
| 3 | Ekaterina Shliapnikova | Individual Neutral Athletes | 47.74 | QS |
| 4 | Denisa Řáhová | Czech Republic | 48.26 | QS |
| 5 | Radostina Angelova | Bulgaria | 49.36 | QS |
| 6 | Rufina Iskakova | Kazakhstan | 49.98 | QS |
| 7 | Bethany Gill | Great Britain | 51.08 | qS |

==== Heat 4 ====
| Rank | Canoeist | Country | Time | Notes |
|---|---|---|---|---|
| 1 | Beatriz Fernandes | Portugal | 47.33 | QS |
| 2 | Kincső Takács | Hungary | 47.69 | QS |
| 3 | Vanesa Tot | Croatia | 48.57 | QS |
| 4 | Lee Ye-lin | South Korea | 48.83 | QS |
| 5 | Sella Monim | Indonesia | 48.97 | QS |
| 6 | Orasa Thiangkathok | Thailand | 49.21 | QS |
| 7 | Mariami Kerdikashvili | Georgia | 49.21 | qS |

=== Semifinals ===
The fastest three boats in each semi advanced to the A final. The next three fastest boats in each semi advanced to the final B.

==== Semifinal 1 ====
| Rank | Canoeist | Country | Time | Notes |
|---|---|---|---|---|
| 1 | Katie Vincent | Canada | 47.23 | FA |
| 2 | Ekaterina Shliapnikova | Individual Neutral Athletes | 47.28 | FA |
| 3 | Denisa Řáhová | Czech Republic | 48.34 | FA |
| 4 | Beatriz Fernandes | Portugal | 48.46 | FB |
| 5 | Yuliya Trushkina | Individual Neutral Athletes | 48.69 | FB |
| 6 | Mariami Kerdikashvili | Georgia | 49.16 | FB |
| 7 | Sella Monim | Indonesia | 49.45 | |
| 8 | María Mailliard | Chile | 49.83 | |
| 9 | Megha Pradeep | India | 51.59 | |

==== Semifinal 2 ====
| Rank | Canoeist | Country | Time | Notes |
|---|---|---|---|---|
| 1 | Yarisleidis Cirilo | Cuba | 46.66 | FA |
| 2 | Olympia Della Giustina | Italy | 47.95 | FA |
| 3 | Kincső Takács | Hungary | 48.21 | FA |
| 4 | Valdenice Conceição | Brazil | 48.37 | FB |
| 5 | Sun Mengya | China | 48.55 | FB |
| 6 | Nilufar Zokirova | Uzbekistan | 49.98 | FB |
| 7 | Tetiana Smylovenko | Azerbaijan | 50.16 | |
| 8 | Lee Ye-lin | South Korea | 50.57 | |
| 9 | Rufina Iskakova | Kazakhstan | 51.02 | |

==== Semifinal 3 ====
| Rank | Canoeist | Country | Time | Notes |
|---|---|---|---|---|
| 1 | Liudmyla Luzan | Ukraine | 45.92 | FA |
| 2 | Viktoriia Yarchevska | Spain | 47.14 | FA |
| 3 | Dorota Borowska | Poland | 47.80 | FA |
| 4 | Elena Glizan | Moldova | 48.66 | FB |
| 5 | Audrey Harper | United States | 49.03 | FB |
| 6 | Vanesa Tot | Croatia | 49.17 | FB |
| 7 | Radostina Angelova | Bulgaria | 50.46 | |
| 8 | Orasa Thiangkathok | Thailand | 51.06 | |
| 9 | Bethany Gill | Great Britain | 51.62 | |

=== Finals ===
==== Final B ====
Competitors in this final raced for positions 10 to 18.

| Rank | Canoeist | Country | Time | Notes |
|---|---|---|---|---|
| 1 | Yuliya Trushkina | Individual Neutral Athletes | 50.08 | |
| 2 | Valdenice Conceição | Brazil | 51.03 | |
| 3 | Beatriz Fernandes | Portugal | 51.28 | |
| 4 | Elena Glizan | Moldova | 51.31 | |
| 5 | Audrey Harper | United States | 51.49 | |
| 6 | Nilufar Zokirova | Uzbekistan | 51.98 | |
| 7 | Sun Mengya | China | 52.46 | |
| 8 | Vanesa Tot | Croatia | 52.70 | |
| 9 | Mariami Kerdikashvili | Georgia | 52.88 | |

==== Final A ====
Competitors raced for positions 1 to 9, with medals going to the top three.

| Rank | Canoeist | Country | Time | Notes |
|---|---|---|---|---|
| 1st place, gold medalist(s) | Liudmyla Luzan | Ukraine | 46.09 | |
| 2nd place, silver medalist(s) | Yarisleidis Cirilo | Cuba | 46.27 | |
| 3rd place, bronze medalist(s) | Ekaterina Shliapnikova | Individual Neutral Athletes | 46.59 | |
| 4 | Katie Vincent | Canada | 46.68 | |
| 5 | Viktoriia Yarchevska | Spain | 47.10 | |
| 6 | Dorota Borowska | Poland | 47.31 | |
| 7 | Olympia Della Giustina | Italy | 47.92 | |
| 8 | Kincső Takács | Hungary | 48.51 | |
| 9 | Denisa Řáhová | Czech Republic | 48.76 | |
