= Canoe sprint at the 2023 European Games – Women's C-1 200 metres =

Women's C-1 200 metres at the 2023 European Games
- Venue: Kryspinów Waterway
- Date: 22–23 June
- Competitors: 14 from 14 nations
- Winning time: 46.653

Medalists
gold medal	Dorota Borowska	Poland
silver medal	Liudmyla Luzan	Ukraine
bronze medal	María Corbera	Spain

The Women's C-1 200 metres canoe sprint competition at the 2023 European Games took place on 22 and 23 June at the Kryspinów Waterway.

== Schedule ==
All times are local (UTC+2).

Date	Time	Round
Thursday, 22 June 2023	9:21	Heats
Thursday, 22 June 2023	16:14	Semifinal
Friday, 23 June 2023	15:13	Final

== Results ==
=== Heats ===
==== Heat 1 ====
Rank	Canoeist	Country	Time	Notes
1	Dorota Borowska	Poland	45.794	QF, GB
2	María Corbera	Spain	46.594	QF
3	Lisa Jahn	Germany	47.454	QF
4	Virág Balla	Hungary	47.718	QS
5	Isabel Evans	Great Britain	48.958	QS
6	Daniela Cociu	Moldova	49.546	QS
7	Gabrielė Čerepokaitė	Lithuania	50.652	QS

==== Heat 2 ====
Rank	Canoeist	Country	Time	Notes
1	Liudmyla Luzan	Ukraine	46.218	QF
2	Vanesa Tot	Croatia	47.694	QF
3	Eugénie Dorange	France	48.292	QF
4	Mariam Kerdikashvili	Georgia	48.460	QS
5	Beatriz Fernandes	Portugal	48.972	QS
6	Denisa Řáhová	Czech Republic	49.518	QS
7	Tijana Arsić	Serbia	51.934	QS

=== Semifinal ===
Rank	Canoeist	Country	Time	Notes
1	Virág Balla	Hungary	48.531	QF
2	Mariam Kerdikashvili	Georgia	48.758	QF
3	Isabel Evans	Great Britain	49.364	QF
4	Beatriz Fernandes	Portugal	50.064	
5	Denisa Řáhová	Czech Republic	50.220	
6	Daniela Cociu	Moldova	50.242	
7	Tijana Arsić	Serbia	52.020	
8	Gabrielė Čerepokaitė	Lithuania	52.092	

=== Final ===
Rank	Canoeist	Country	Time
1st place, gold medalist(s)	Dorota Borowska	Poland	46.653
2nd place, silver medalist(s)	Liudmyla Luzan	Ukraine	46.937
3rd place, bronze medalist(s)	María Corbera	Spain	47.441
4	Lisa Jahn	Germany	47.789
5	Vanesa Tot	Croatia	48.155
6	Virág Balla	Hungary	49.011
7	Eugénie Dorange	France	49.589
8	Mariam Kerdikashvili	Georgia	49.789
9	Isabel Evans	Great Britain	50.259
