= Loske =

Loske is a surname. Notable people with the surname include:

- Annika Loske (born 1998), German sprint canoeist
- Carlotta Loske (born 2007), German sprint canoeist
