= Canoe sprint at the 2023 European Games – Women's C-1 500 metres =

Canoe sprint competition at the Kryspinów Waterway

Women's C-1 500 metres at the 2023 European Games
- Venue: Kryspinów Waterway
- Date: 24 June
- Competitors: 8 from 8 nations
- Winning time: 2:02.920

Medalists
gold medal	Liudmyla Luzan	Ukraine
silver medal	María Corbera	Spain
bronze medal	Ágnes Kiss	Hungary

The women's C-1 500 metres canoe sprint competition at the 2023 European Games took place on 24 June at the Kryspinów Waterway.

== Schedule ==
All times are local (UTC+2).

Date	Time	Round
Saturday, 24 June 2023	12:48	Final

== Results ==
Rank	Canoeist	Country	Time
1st place, gold medalist(s)	Liudmyla Luzan	Ukraine	2:02.920 EB
2nd place, silver medalist(s)	María Corbera	Spain	2:03.990
3rd place, bronze medalist(s)	Ágnes Kiss	Hungary	2:04.576
4	Maria Olărașu	Moldova	2:08.700
5	Vanesa Tot	Croatia	2:09.144
6	Annika Loske	Germany	2:09.582
7	Martina Malíková	Czech Republic	2:11.258
8	Mariam Kerdikashvili	Georgia	2:13.916
