= 2019 ICF Canoe Sprint World Championships – Women's C-1 5000 metres =

Women's C-1 5000 metres at the 2019 ICF Canoe Sprint World Championships
- Venue: Olympic Centre of Szeged
- Location: Szeged, Hungary
- Dates: 25 August
- Competitors: 17 from 17 nations
- Winning time: 25:34.67

Medalists
gold medal	Volha Klimava	Belarus
silver medal	María Mailliard	Chile
bronze medal	Zhang Yajue	China

The women's C-1 5000 metres competition at the 2019 ICF Canoe Sprint World Championships in Szeged took place at the Olympic Centre of Szeged.

== Schedule ==
The schedule was as follows:

Date	Time	Round
Sunday 25 August 2019	14:30	Final

All times are Central European Summer Time (UTC+2)

== Results ==
As a long-distance event, it was held as a direct final.

Rank	Canoeist	Country	Time
1st place, gold medalist(s)	Volha Klimava	Belarus	25:34.67
2nd place, silver medalist(s)	María Mailliard	Chile	25:56.41
3rd place, bronze medalist(s)	Zhang Yajue	China	26:14.90
4	Zsanett Lakatos	Hungary	26:30.41
5	María Corbera	Spain	26:30.82
6	Bernadette Wallace	Australia	26:34.53
7	Maria Kazakova	Russia	26:58.27
8	Liudmyla Babak	Ukraine	27:25.58
9	Vanesa Tot	Croatia	27:39.44
10	Trương Thị Phượng	Vietnam	27:39.52
11	O Su-rim	North Korea	28:17.92
12	Magda Stanny	Poland	28:21.23
13	Anna Palmer	Great Britain	28:31.64
14	Ann Marie Armstrong	United States	28:42.92
–	Annika Loske	Germany	DNF
–	Clara Montesdeoca	Guatemala	DNF
–	Leong I Cheng	Macau	DNF
