= 2022 ICF Canoe Sprint World Championships – Women's C-1 1000 metres =

Women's C-1 1000 metres at the 2022 ICF Canoe Sprint World Championships
- Venue: Lake Banook
- Location: Dartmouth, Canada
- Dates: 6 August
- Competitors: 7 from 7 nations
- Winning time: 4:47.90

Medalists
gold medal	Liudmyla Luzan	Ukraine
silver medal	María Mailliard	Chile
bronze medal	Annika Loske	Germany

The women's C-1 1000 metres competition at the 2022 ICF Canoe Sprint World Championships in Dartmouth took place on Lake Banook.

== Schedule ==
The schedule is as follows:

Date	Time	Round
Saturday 6 August 2022	12:44	Final

== Results ==
With fewer than ten competitors entered, this event was held as a direct final.

Rank	Canoeist	Country	Time
1st place, gold medalist(s)	Liudmyla Luzan	Ukraine	4:47.90
2nd place, silver medalist(s)	María Mailliard	Chile	4:50.02
3rd place, bronze medalist(s)	Annika Loske	Germany	4:51.46
4	Virág Balla	Hungary	4:52.49
5	Jacy Grant	Canada	4:56.19
6	Magda Stanny	Poland	5:15.54
7	Azusa Murphy	United States	5:17.04
