= 2023 ICF Canoe Sprint World Championships – Women's C-1 1000 metres =

Women's C-1 1000 metres at the 2023 ICF Canoe Sprint World Championships
- Venue: Sportpark Duisburg
- Location: Duisburg, Germany
- Dates: 23–26 August
- Competitors: 16 from 16 nations
- Winning time: 4:24.958

Medalists
gold medal	María Mailliard	Chile
silver medal	Jacy Grant	Canada
bronze medal	Li Li	China

The women's C-1 1000 metres competition at the 2023 ICF Canoe Sprint World Championships in Duisburg took place in Sportpark Duisburg.

== Schedule ==
The schedule is as follows:

Date	Time	Round
Wednesday 23 August 2023	16:52	Heats
Thursday 24 August 2023	16:14	Semifinal
Saturday 26 August 2023	11:24	Final

== Results ==
=== Heats ===
The fastest three boats in each heat advanced directly to the final.
The next four fastest boats in each heat, plus the fastest remaining boat advanced to the semifinal.

==== Heat 1 ====
Rank	Canoeist	Country	Time	Notes
1	Jacy Grant	Canada	4:50.220	QF
2	Li Li	China	4:52.098	QF
3	Olena Tsyhankova	Ukraine	4:59.475	QF
4	Cristina Soutelo	Spain	5:02.790	QS
5	Anna Palmer	Great Britain	5:06.581	QS
6	Elena Glizan	Moldova	5:16.309	QS
7	Madison Velásquez	Colombia	5:25.909	QS
8	Maoli Angulo	Ecuador	5:31.992	QS

==== Heat 2 ====
Rank	Canoeist	Country	Time	Notes
1	Zsófia Kisbán	Hungary	4:44.402	QF
2	María Mailliard	Chile	4:44.873	QF
3	Mariya Brovkova	Kazakhstan	4:45.057	QF
4	Ophelia Preller	Germany	4:45.805	QS
5	Emma Albrecht	United States	5:11.262	QS
6	Megumi Tsubota	Japan	5:14.510	QS
7	Tania Virijac	Romania	5:22.391	QS
	Kaveri Dimar	India	DSQ	

=== Semifinal ===
The fastest three boats advanced to the final.

Rank	Canoeist	Country	Time	Notes
1	Ophelia Preller	Germany	4:34.628	QF
2	Elena Glizan	Moldova	4:45.117	QF
3	Cristina Soutelo	Spain	4:45.487	QF
4	Madison Velásquez	Colombia	4:46.484	
5	Anna Palmer	Great Britain	4:46.774	
6	Megumi Tsubota	Japan	4:51.208	
7	Emma Albrecht	United States	4:58.147	
8	Tania Virijac	Romania	5:00.401	
9	Maoli Angulo	Ecuador	5:19.182	

=== Final ===
Competitors raced for positions 1 to 9, with medals going to the top three.

Rank	Canoeist	Country	Time
1st place, gold medalist(s)	María Mailliard	Chile	4:24.958
2nd place, silver medalist(s)	Jacy Grant	Canada	4:26.955
3rd place, bronze medalist(s)	Li Li	China	4:27.113
4	Zsófia Kisbán	Hungary	4:27.208
5	Ophelia Preller	Germany	4:30.441
6	Mariya Brovkova	Kazakhstan	4:32.419
7	Olena Tsyhankova	Ukraine	4:38.671
8	Cristina Soutelo	Spain	4:48.678
9	Elena Glizan	Moldova	4:57.943
