= Canoe sprint at the 2023 European Games – Women's C-2 500 metres =

Women's C-2 500 metres at the 2023 European Games
- Venue: Kryspinów Waterway
- Date: 21–22 June
- Competitors: 20 from 10 nations
- Teams: 10
- Winning time: 1:58.233

Medalists
gold medal	Liudmyla Luzan; Valeriia Tereta	Ukraine
silver medal	María Corbera; Antía Jácome	Spain
bronze medal	Giada Bragato; Bianka Nagy	Hungary

The women's C-2 500 metres canoe sprint competition at the 2023 European Games took place on 21 and 22 June at the Kryspinów Waterway.

== Schedule ==
All times are local (UTC+2).

Date	Time	Round
Wednesday, 21 June 2023	9:40	Heats
Wednesday, 21 June 2023	15:53	Semifinal
Thursday, 22 June 2023	14:25	Final

== Results ==
=== Heats ===
==== Heat 1 ====
Rank	Canoeists	Country	Time	Notes
1	Antía Jácome; María Corbera	Spain	1:58.285	QF
2	Liudmyla Luzan; Valeriia Tereta	Ukraine	1:59.152	QF
3	Lisa Jahn; Hedi Kliemke	Germany	2:01.212	QF
4	Axelle Renard; Eugénie Dorange	France	2:01.498	QS
5	Denisa Řáhová; Martina Malíková	Czech Republic	2:12.353	QS

==== Heat 2 ====
Rank	Canoeists	Country	Time	Notes
1	Giada Bragato; Bianka Nagy	Hungary	1:59.473	QF
2	Daniela Cociu; Maria Olărașu	Moldova	2:00.433	QF
3	Sylwia Szczerbińska; Julia Walczak	Poland	2:02.226	QF
4	Inês Penetra; Beatriz Fernandes	Portugal	2:04.183	QS
5	Bethany Gill; Katie Reid	Great Britain	2:06.410	QS

=== Semifinal ===
Rank	Canoeists	Country	Time	Notes
1	Axelle Renard; Eugénie Dorange	France	2:03.952	QF
2	Inês Penetra; Beatriz Fernandes	Portugal	2:05.618	QF
3	Denisa Řáhová; Martina Malíková	Czech Republic	2:05.752	QF
4	Bethany Gill; Katie Reid	Great Britain	2:07.485	

=== Final ===
Rank	Canoeists	Country	Time
1st place, gold medalist(s)	Liudmyla Luzan; Valeriia Tereta	Ukraine	1:58.233
2nd place, silver medalist(s)	Antía Jácome; María Corbera	Spain	1:58.506
3rd place, bronze medalist(s)	Giada Bragato; Bianka Nagy	Hungary	1:59.163
4	Daniela Cociu; Maria Olărașu	Moldova	2:00.121
5	Lisa Jahn; Hedi Kliemke	Germany	2:01.121
6	Sylwia Szczerbińska; Julia Walczak	Poland	2:01.511
7	Axelle Renard; Eugénie Dorange	France	2:02.301
8	Inês Penetra; Beatriz Fernandes	Portugal	2:05.296
9	Denisa Řáhová; Martina Malíková	Czech Republic	2:09.849
