= Canoeing at the 2019 Pan American Games – Women's C-1 200 metres =

Women's C-1 200 metres at the 2019 Pan American Games
- Venue: Albufera Medio Mundo
- Dates: July 28–30
- Competitors: 9 from 9 nations

Medalists
Gold medal	Nevin Harrison	United States
Silver medal	María Mailliard	Chile
Bronze medal	Mayvihanet Borges	Cuba

The women's C-1 200 metres canoeing event at the 2019 Pan American Games was held between the 28 and 30 of July at the Albufera Medio Mundo in the city of Huacho.

== Results ==
=== Heats ===
Qualification Rules: 1..2->Final, 3..6->Semifinals, Rest Out

==== Heat 1 ====
Rank	Athletes	Country	Time	Notes
1	Nevin Harrison	United States	45.821	F
2	Mayvihanet Borges	Cuba	46.361	F
3	Anna Roy-Cyr	Canada	47.589	SF
4	Stephanie Rodríguez	Mexico	50.824	SF
5	Clara Montesdeoca	Guatemala	53.156	SF

==== Heat 2 ====
Rank	Athletes	Country	Time	Notes
1	María Mailliard	Chile	45.993	F
2	Valdenice Conceição	Brazil	46.715	F
3	Manuela Gómez	Colombia	49.448	SF
4	Belén Ibarra	Ecuador	57.018	SF

=== Semifinal ===
Qualification Rules: 1..4->Final, Rest Out

Rank	Athletes	Country	Time	Notes
1	Anna Roy-Cyr	Canada	46.560	F
2	Manuela Gómez	Colombia	48.380	F
3	Stephanie Rodríguez	Mexico	50.135	F
4	Clara Montesdeoca	Guatemala	50.725	F
5	Belén Ibarra	Ecuador	52.260	

=== Final ===
Rank	Athletes	Country	Time	Notes
1st place, gold medalist(s)	Nevin Harrison	United States	46.649	
2nd place, silver medalist(s)	María Mailliard	Chile	47.031	
3rd place, bronze medalist(s)	Mayvihanet Borges	Cuba	47.641	
4	Valdenice Conceição	Brazil	48.054	
5	Anna Roy-Cyr	Canada	48.294	
6	Manuela Gómez	Colombia	49.991	
7	Stephanie Rodríguez	Mexico	51.601	
8	Clara Montesdeoca	Guatemala	52.559	
