= Maike Jakob =

German canoeist (born 2005)

Personal information
- Born: 25 October 2005 (age 20) Magdeburg, Germany

Sport
- Country: Germany
- Sport: Canoe sprint
- Event: C–2 500 m
Medal record
Women's canoe sprint
Representing Germany
World Championships
Gold medal – first place	2026 Poznań	C-2 500 m
European Championships
Silver medal – second place	2026 Montemor-o-Velho	C-4 Mix 500 m

Maike Jakob (born 25 October 2005) is a German sprint canoeist.

== Career ==
In June 2026, Jakob competed at the 2026 Canoe Sprint European Championships and won a silver medal in the mixed C-4 500 metres. In August 2026, she competed at the 2026 ICF Canoe Sprint World Championships and won a gold medal in the C-2 500 metres, along with Carlotta Loske, with a time of 2:01.65.
