= Valeriia Tereta =

Ukrainian canoeist (born 2000)

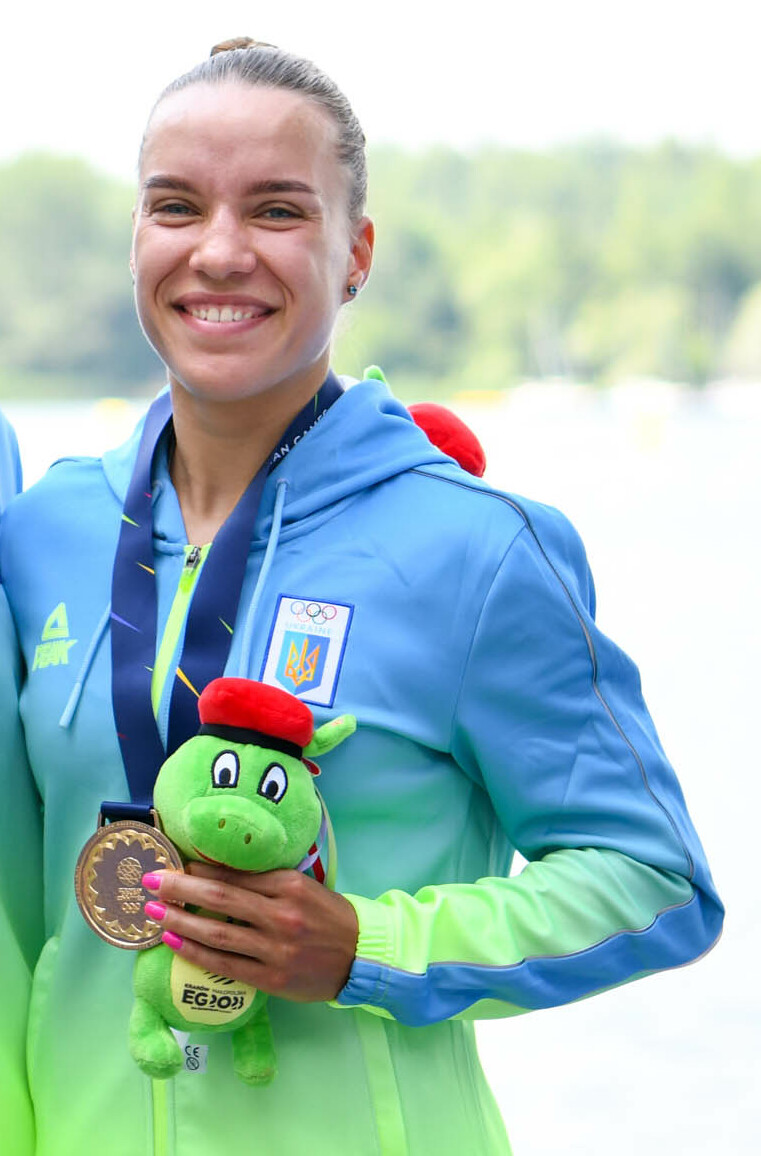
- Tereta with gold medal of the 2023 European Games

Personal information
- Full name: Valeriia Serhiivna Tereta
- Born: 9 September 2000 (age 26) Shatsk, Volyn Oblast, Ukraine
- Height: 1.68 m (5 ft 6 in)
- Weight: 57 kg (126 lb)

Sport
- Country: Ukraine
- Sport: Canoe sprint
Medal record
Women's canoe sprint
Representing Ukraine
World Championships
Bronze medal – third place	2024 Samarkand	C-1 5000 m
European Games
Gold medal – first place	2023 Kraków-Małopolska	C-2 500 m
European Championships
Silver medal – second place	2024 Szeged	C-1 5000 m

Valeriia Serhiivna Tereta (Ukrainian: Валерія Сергіївна Терета; born 9 September 2000 in Shatsk, Volyn Oblast, Ukraine) is a Ukrainian sprint canoeist. She is champion of the 2023 European Games.

== Career ==
In 2022, Tereta became two-time bronze medallist of the European Junior Championships in Belgrade.

In 2023, Tereta together with Liudmyla Luzan became champion of the 2023 European Games in the C-2 500 m competition. Together with Luzan, she qualified for the 2024 Summer Olympics through the 2023 ICF Canoe Sprint World Championships in Duisburg. Nevertheless, she was substituted for the Games with 2020 silver medallist Anastasiia Rybachok.

== Personal life ==
Tereta studied at the Lviv State School of Physical Culture. She lives and trains in Lviv.
