= Inna Nedelkina =

Belarusian canoeist (born 2004)

Personal information
- Full name: Inna Kirylauna Nedelkina
- Nationality: Belarusian
- Born: 16 October 2004 (age 21)

Sport
- Country: Belarus
- Sport: Canoe sprint
- Event: C–2 200 m
Medal record
Women's canoe sprint
Representing ANA
World Championships
Gold medal – first place	2024 Samarkand	C–2 200 m
Gold medal – first place	2026 Poznań	C-2 200 m
Silver medal – second place	2025 Milan	C-2 200 m
Bronze medal – third place	2024 Samarkand	C–2 Mix 500 m
Bronze medal – third place	2026 Poznań	C-2 500 m

Inna Kirylauna Nedelkina (Belarusian: Іна Кірылаўна Нядзелькіна; born 16 October 2004) is a Belarusian sprint canoeist. She is a 2024 ICF Canoe Sprint World Championships gold medalist.

== Career ==
In June 2024, Nedelkina competed at the 2024 BRICS Games and won a silver medal in the 200 metres, and a bronze medal in the 500 metres.

In August 2024, she competed at the 2024 ICF Canoe Sprint World Championships and won a gold medal in the C–2 200 metres event with a time of 43.053, along with Yuliya Trushkina. She also won a bronze medal in the C–2 mixed 500 metres event.

== Major results ==
=== World championships ===
Year	C-2 200	XC-2 500
2024	1st place, gold medalist(s)	3rd place, bronze medalist(s)
