= Zhang Yajue =

Chinese canoeist (born 2000)

Personal information
- Nationality: Chinese
- Born: 2000 (age 25–26)

Sport
- Country: China
- Sport: Sprint canoe
- Event: C-1 5000 m
Medal record
Women's canoe sprint
Representing China
World Championships
Bronze medal – third place	2019 Szeged	C-1 5000 m
Asian Championships
Gold medal – first place	2017 Shanghai	C-4 200 m

Zhang Yajue (born 2000) is a Chinese sprint canoeist.

She won a medal at the 2019 ICF Canoe Sprint World Championships.
