= Carlotta Loske =

German canoeist (born 2007)

Personal information
- Born: 16 November 2007 (age 18)

Sport
- Country: Germany
- Sport: Canoe sprint
- Event: C–1 5000, C–2 500 m
Medal record
Women's canoe sprint
Representing Germany
World Championships
Gold medal – first place	2026 Poznań	C-1 5000 m
Gold medal – first place	2026 Poznań	C-2 500 m
European Championships
Bronze medal – third place	2026 Montemor-o-Velho	C-1 5000 m

Carlotta Loske (born 16 November 2007) is a German sprint canoeist.

== Career ==
In June 2026, Loske competed at the 2026 Canoe Sprint European Championships and won a bronze medal in the C-1 5000 metres. In August 2026, she competed at the 2026 ICF Canoe Sprint World Championships and won a gold medal in the C-2 500 metres, along with Maike Jakob, with a time of 2:01.65.

== Personal life ==
Loske's older sister, Annika Loske, is a former sprint canoeist.
