= Yuliya Trushkina =

Belarusian canoeist (born 2002)

Personal information
- Full name: Yuliya Andreyeuna Trushkina
- Nationality: Belarusian
- Born: 23 October 2002 (age 23)
- Home town: Gomel, Belarus

Sport
- Country: Belarus
- Sport: Canoe sprint
- Events: C–1 200 m, C–2 200 m
Medal record
Women's canoe sprint
Representing ANA
World Championships
Gold medal – first place	2024 Samarkand	C–2 200 m
Gold medal – first place	2026 Poznań	C-2 200 m
Silver medal – second place	2025 Milan	C-2 200 m
European Championships
Bronze medal – third place	2024 Szeged	C–1 200 m

Yuliya Andreyeuna Trushkina (Belarusian: Юлія Андрэеўна Трушкіна; born 23 October 2002) is a Belarusian canoeist. She represented Individual Neutral Athletes at the 2024 Summer Olympics.

== Career ==
Trushkina competed at the 2024 European Canoe Sprint Qualifier in Szeged, Hungary and won the C–1 200 metres, and qualified to represent Individual Neutral Athletes at the 2024 Summer Olympics. She competed in the C-1 200 metres event and finished in fifth place.

In June 2024, Trushkina competed at the 2024 Canoe Sprint European Championships and won a bronze medal in the C-1 200 metres event. In August 2024 she competed at the 2024 ICF Canoe Sprint World Championships and won a gold medal in the C–2 200 metres event with a time of 43.053 seconds, along with Inna Nedelkina.

In August 2025, she competed at the 2025 ICF Canoe Sprint World Championships and won a silver medal in the C-2 200 metres with a time of 42.59 seconds. She again competed at the 2026 ICF Canoe Sprint World Championships and won a gold medal in the C-2 200 metres with a time of 42.26 seconds.
