= Nadzeya Makarchanka =

Belarusian canoeist

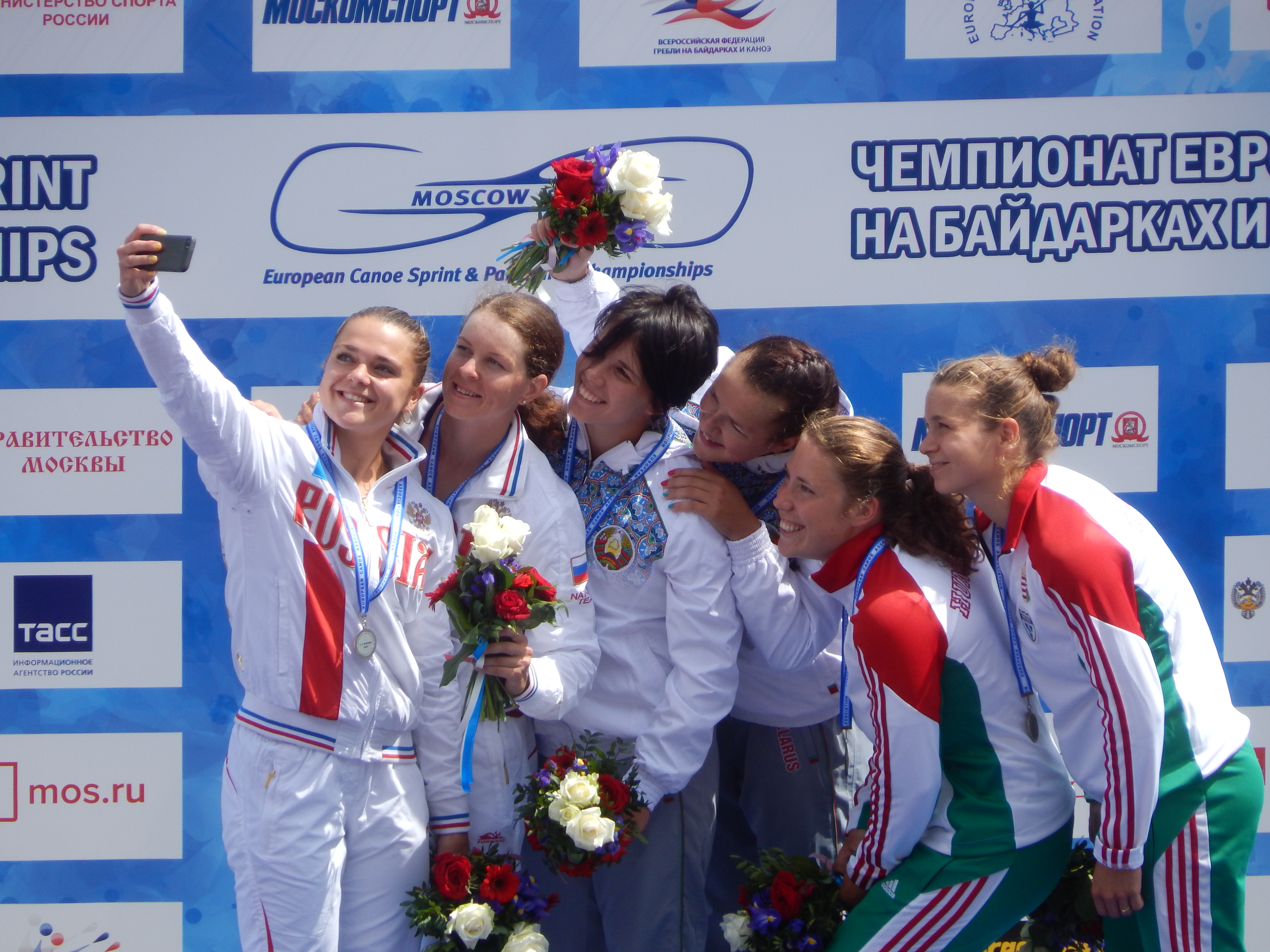

Personal information
- Nationality: Belarusian
- Born: 22 March 1998 (age 28)
- Height: 1.70 m (5 ft 7 in)

Sport
- Country: Belarus
- Sport: Canoe sprint
Medal record
Women's canoe sprint
Representing Belarus
World Championships
Gold medal – first place	2021 Copenhagen	C-4 500 m
Silver medal – second place	2021 Copenhagen	C-2 500 m
Bronze medal – third place	2018 Montemor-o-Velho	C-2 500 m
Bronze medal – third place	2019 Szeged	C-2 500 m
European Games
Silver medal – second place	2019 Minsk	C-2 500 m
European Championships
Gold medal – first place	2016 Moscow	C-2 500 m
Silver medal – second place	2018 Belgrade	C-2 500 m

Nadzeya Makarchanka (Belarusian: Надзея Макарчанка; born 22 March 1998) is a Belarusian sprint canoeist.

She participated at the 2018 ICF Canoe Sprint World Championships, winning a medal.
