= Volha Klimava =

Belarusian canoeist (born 1995)

Personal information
- Nationality: Belarusian
- Born: 5 November 1995 (age 30) Mir, Belarus

Sport
- Country: Belarus
- Sport: Canoe sprint
Medal record
Representing Belarus
Women's canoe sprint
World Championships
| Gold medal – first place | 2019 Szeged | C-1 5000 m |
| Gold medal – first place | 2021 Copenhagen | C-1 5000 m |
| Gold medal – first place | 2021 Copenhagen | C-4 500 m |
| Bronze medal – third place | 2018 Montemor-o-Velho | C-2 500 m |
| Bronze medal – third place | 2019 Szeged | C-2 500 m |
European Games
| Silver medal – second place | 2019 Minsk | C-2 500 m |
European Championships
| Gold medal – first place | 2018 Belgrade | C-1 5000 m |
| Gold medal – first place | 2021 Poznań | C-1 5000 m |
| Silver medal – second place | 2014 Brandenburg | C-2 500 m |
| Silver medal – second place | 2018 Belgrade | C-2 500 m |
Women's canoe marathon
World Championships
| Silver medal – second place | 2021 Pitești | C-1 |
| Bronze medal – third place | 2021 Pitești | C-1 short race |
Representing Individual Neutral Athletes
Women's canoe sprint
World Championships
| Gold medal – first place | 2025 Milan | C-1 5000 m |
| Silver medal – second place | 2024 Samarkand | C-4 Mix 500 m |
| Silver medal – second place | 2025 Milan | C-4 500 m |
European Championships
| Gold medal – first place | 2024 Szeged | C-1 5000 m |
| Bronze medal – third place | 2024 Szeged | C-2 500 m |

Volha Uladzimirauna Klimava (Belarusian: Вольга Уладзіміраўна Клімава; born 5 November 1995) is a Belarusian sprint canoeist.

She participated at the 2018 ICF Canoe Sprint World Championships, winning a medal.

== Major results ==
=== World championships ===
| Year | C-1 200 | С-1 5000 | C-2 200 | C-2 500 | C-4 500 | XC-4 500 |
|---|---|---|---|---|---|---|
| 2014 | 9 | —N/a | —N/a | | —N/a | —N/a |
| 2018 | | 4 | | 3rd place, bronze medalist(s) | —N/a | —N/a |
| 2019 | | 1st place, gold medalist(s) | 4 | 3rd place, bronze medalist(s) | —N/a | —N/a |
| 2021 | | 1st place, gold medalist(s) | 4 SF | | 1st place, gold medalist(s) | —N/a |
| 2024 | —N/a | | 5 | —N/a | —N/a | 2nd place, silver medalist(s) |
