= 2024 ICF Canoe Sprint World Championships =

Canoe sprint event in Uzbekistan

- Venue: Rowing and Canoeing Race Course in Samarkand
- Location: Samarkand, Uzbekistan
- Dates: 23–25 August

The 2024 ICF Canoe Sprint World Championships were held from 23 to 25 August 2024 in Samarkand, Uzbekistan.

Since this edition was held in a year coinciding with the Olympics, only non-olympic events were held.

== Medal summary ==
=== Medal table ===
* Host nation (Uzbekistan)

Rank	Nation	Gold	Silver	Bronze	Total
–	Authorised Neutral Athletes	9	6	2	17
1	Hungary	2	4	3	9
2	Portugal	2	2	0	4
3	Poland	2	1	0	3
4	Ukraine	2	0	2	4
5	Moldova	1	2	0	3
6	Czech Republic	1	1	1	3
7	Chile	1	1	0	2
8	Denmark	1	0	1	2
9	Spain	0	1	3	4
10	Sweden	0	1	2	3
11	Germany	0	1	1	2
12	China	0	0	2	2
13	Georgia	0	0	1	1
13	Kazakhstan	0	0	1	1
13	Romania	0	0	1	1
13	Slovenia	0	0	1	1
Totals (16 entries)		21	20	21	62

Source: Medals Ranking

=== Men ===
==== Canoe ====
Event	Gold		Silver		Bronze	
C–1 200 m	Oleksii Koliadych; Poland	38.660	Pablo Graña; Spain	39.083	Zaza Nadiradze; Georgia	39.180
C–1 500 m	Serghei Tarnovschi; Moldova	1:47.312	Martin Fuksa; Czech Republic	1:48.405	Cătălin Chirilă; Romania	1:48.456
C–1 500 m	Zakhar Petrov; Authorised Neutral Athletes	1:47.312	Martin Fuksa; Czech Republic	1:48.405	Cătălin Chirilă; Romania	1:48.456
C–1 5000 m	Wiktor Głazunow; Poland	25:33.565	Serghei Tarnovschi; Moldova	25:49.241	Balázs Adolf; Hungary	26:30.410
C–2 1000 m	Authorised Neutral Athletes; Zakhar Petrov; Ivan Dmitriev	3:41.510	Hungary; Balázs Adolf; Dániel Fejes	3:42.120	Ukraine; Yurii Vandiuk; Pavlo Borsuk	3:42.433

==== Kayak ====
Event	Gold		Silver		Bronze	
K–1 200 m	Messias Baptista; Portugal	34.876	Jakub Stepun; Poland	34.945	Carlos Garrote; Spain	35.308
K–1 500 m	Josef Dostál; Czech Republic	1:37.309	Fernando Pimenta; Portugal	1:38.049	Uladzislau Kravets; Authorised Neutral Athletes	1:38.437
K–1 5000 m	Mads Pedersen; Denmark	22:39.488	Fernando Pimenta; Portugal	22:55.097	Joakim Lindberg; Sweden	22:59.119
K–2 1000 m	Authorised Neutral Athletes; Mikita Borykau; Aleh Yurenia	3:19.104	Sweden; Joakim Lindberg; Martin Nathell	3:20.543	Germany; Felix Frank; Martin Hiller	3:32.736

=== Women ===
==== Canoe ====
Event	Gold		Silver		Bronze	
C–1 500 m	Liudmyla Luzan; Ukraine	2:06.881	María Mailliard; Chile	2:08.912	Mariya Brovkova; Kazakhstan	2:09.731
C–1 1000 m	Alena Nazdrova; Authorised Neutral Athletes	4:45.286	Giada Bragato; Hungary	4:47.684	Jiang Xina; China	4:49.521
C–1 5000 m	María Mailliard; Chile	31:15.084	Annika Loske; Germany	31:37.596	Valeriia Tereta; Ukraine	31:53.552
C–2 200 m	Authorised Neutral Athletes; Yuliya Trushkina; Inna Nedelkina	43.053	Moldova; Daniela Cociu; Maria Olărașu	44.104	China; Xu Shengnan; Xiang Jingjing	44.664

==== Kayak ====
Event	Gold		Silver		Bronze	
K–1 200 m	Liudmyla Kuklinovska; Ukraine	41.414	Anastasiia Dolgova; Authorised Neutral Athletes	42.183	Bolette Nyvang Iversen; Denmark	42.761
K–1 200 m	Liudmyla Kuklinovska; Ukraine	41.414	Anastasiia Dolgova; Authorised Neutral Athletes	42.183	Janka Rugonfalvi-Kiss; Hungary	42.761
K–1 1000 m	Emese Kőhalmi; Hungary	4:03.433	Maryna Litvinchuk; Authorised Neutral Athletes	4:07.277	Melina Andersson; Sweden	4:07.687
K–1 5000 m	Emese Kőhalmi; Hungary	25:18.913	Maryna Litvinchuk; Authorised Neutral Athletes	25:35.267	Miriam Vega; Spain	25:58.804
K–2 200 m	Authorised Neutral Athletes; Svetlana Chernigovskaya; Anastasiia Dolgova	37.326	Authorised Neutral Athletes; Volha Khudzenka; Maryna Litvinchuk	37.667	Hungary; Réka Kiskó; Angelina Szegedi	38.668

=== Mixed ===
Event	Gold		Silver		Bronze	
XC–2 500 m	Authorised Neutral Athletes; Alexey Korovashkov; Ekaterina Shliapnikova	1:47.898	Hungary; Kincső Takács; Jonatán Hajdu	1:48.693	Authorised Neutral Athletes; Uladzislau Paleshko; Inna Nedelkina	1:49.343
XC–4 500 m	Authorised Neutral Athletes; Sofiia Shtil; Ekaterina Shliapnikova; Zakhar Petrov; Ivan Shtyl	1:37.187	Authorised Neutral Athletes; Anhelina Bardanouskaya; Uladzislau Paleshko; Vitali Asetski; Volha Klimava	1:38.694	Spain; Valéria Oliveira; Viktoriia Yarchevska; Manuel Fontán; Adrián Sieiro	1:39.753
XK–2 500 m	Portugal; Teresa Portela; Messias Baptista	1:37.592	Authorised Neutral Athletes; Volha Khudzenka; Dzmitry Natynchyk	1:37.603	Czech Republic; Josef Dostál; Anežka Paloudová	1:38.340
XK–4 500 m	Authorised Neutral Athletes; Nadzeya Kushner; Volha Khudzenka; Uladzislau Kravets; Dzmitry Natynchyk	1:24.907	Hungary; Laura Ujfalvi; Emese Kőhalmi; Márk Opavszky; Gergely Balogh	1:25.731	Slovenia; Mia Medved; Anja Osterman; Anže Urankar; Rok Šmit	1:26.980
