= Kincső Takács =

Hungarian canoeist (born 1993)

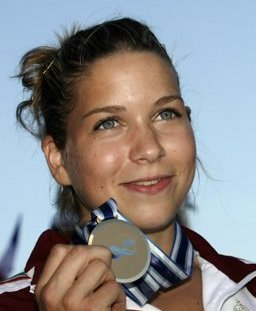

Personal information
- Nationality: Hungarian
- Born: 17 September 1993 (age 32) Győr, Hungary
- Height: 1.67 m (5 ft 6 in)

Sport
- Country: Hungary
- Sport: Canoe sprint
- Club: Győri VE
Medal record
Women's canoe sprint
Representing Hungary
World Championships
Gold medal – first place	2014 Moscow	C-2 500 m
Silver medal – second place	2013 Dusiburg	C-2 500 m
Silver medal – second place	2015 Milan	C-1 200 m
Silver medal – second place	2018 Montemor-o-Velho	C-2 500 m
Silver medal – second place	2019 Szeged	C-2 200 m
Silver medal – second place	2019 Szeged	C-2 500 m
Silver medal – second place	2021 Copenhagen	C-4 500 m
Silver medal – second place	2024 Samarkand	C-2 Mix 500 m
Bronze medal – third place	2011 Szeged	C-2 500 m
Bronze medal – third place	2015 Milan	C-2 500 m
Bronze medal – third place	2017 Račice	C-1 200 m
Bronze medal – third place	2021 Copenhagen	C-2 Mix 200 m
Bronze medal – third place	2022 Dartmouth	C-4 500 m
European Games
Gold medal – first place	2019 Minsk	C-2 500 m
European Championships
Gold medal – first place	2012 Zagreb	C-2 500 m
Gold medal – first place	2013 Montemor-o-Velho	C-2 500 m
Gold medal – first place	2014 Branderburg	C-2 500 m
Gold medal – first place	2017 Plovdiv	C-2 500 m
Gold medal – first place	2018 Belgrade	C-2 200 m
Gold medal – first place	2018 Belgrade	C-2 500 m
Silver medal – second place	2015 Račice	C-2 500 m
Silver medal – second place	2017 Plovdiv	C-1 200 m
Silver medal – second place	2021 Poznań	C-2 200 m
Bronze medal – third place	2013 Montemor-o-Velho	C-1 200 m
Bronze medal – third place	2016 Moscow	C-2 500 m
Bronze medal – third place	2021 Poznań	C-2 500 m

Kincső Takács (born 17 September 1993) is a Hungarian sprint canoeist.

She participated at the 2018 ICF Canoe Sprint World Championships, winning a medal.

== Major results ==
=== Olympic Games ===
Year	C-1 200	C-2 500
2020	6 FB	5
2024	8	

=== World championships ===
Year	C-1 200	C-2 200	C-2 500	C-4 500	XC-2 200	XC-2 500
2011	6	—N/a	3rd place, bronze medalist(s)	—N/a	—N/a	—N/a
2013		—N/a	2nd place, silver medalist(s)	—N/a	—N/a	—N/a
2014		—N/a	1st place, gold medalist(s)	—N/a	—N/a	—N/a
2015	2nd place, silver medalist(s)	—N/a	3rd place, bronze medalist(s)	—N/a	—N/a	—N/a
2017	3rd place, bronze medalist(s)	—N/a	4	—N/a	—N/a	—N/a
2018			2nd place, silver medalist(s)	—N/a	—N/a	—N/a
2019		2nd place, silver medalist(s)	2nd place, silver medalist(s)	—N/a	—N/a	—N/a
2021			4	2nd place, silver medalist(s)	3rd place, bronze medalist(s)	—N/a
2022	7 SF			3rd place, bronze medalist(s)	—N/a	
2023		6			—N/a	4
2024	—N/a	5	—N/a	—N/a	—N/a	2nd place, silver medalist(s)
