= Annika Loske =

German canoeist (born 1998)

Personal information
- Nationality: German
- Born: 17 May 1998 (age 28)

Sport
- Country: Germany
- Sport: Canoe sprint
- Event: Canoeing
- Club: KC Potsdam
Medal record
World Championships
Silver medal – second place	2018 Montemor-o-Velho	C-1 5000 m
Silver medal – second place	2022 Dartmouth	C-1 5000 m
Silver medal – second place	2023 Duisburg	C-4 500 m
Silver medal – second place	2024 Samarkand	C-1 5000 m
Bronze medal – third place	2022 Dartmouth	C-1 1000 m
European Games
Bronze medal – third place	2023 Kraków-Małopolska	C-2 Mix 200 m
European Championships
Silver medal – second place	2022 Munich	C-1 5000 m

Annika Loske (born 17 May 1998) is a German sprint canoeist.

== Career ==
She participated at the 2018 ICF Canoe Sprint World Championships.

== Personal life ==
Loske's younger sister, Carlotta Loske, is also a sprint canoeist.

== Major results ==
=== World championships ===
Year	C-1 200	C-1 500	C-1 1000	С-1 5000	C-2 200	C-2 500	C-4 500	XC-2 200	XC-2 500
2015		—N/a	—N/a	—N/a	—N/a	4 FB	—N/a	—N/a	—N/a
2017		—N/a	—N/a	—N/a	—N/a	7	—N/a	—N/a	—N/a
2018		1 FB	—N/a	2nd place, silver medalist(s)			—N/a	—N/a	—N/a
2019	8 SF		—N/a	DNF			—N/a	—N/a	—N/a
2021	5 SF	9	—N/a	5				8	—N/a
2022			3rd place, bronze medalist(s)	2nd place, silver medalist(s)				—N/a	
2023	9			4			2nd place, silver medalist(s)	—N/a	
2024	—N/a		6	2nd place, silver medalist(s)		—N/a	—N/a	—N/a	DNS F
