= Virág Balla =

Hungarian canoeist (born 1994)

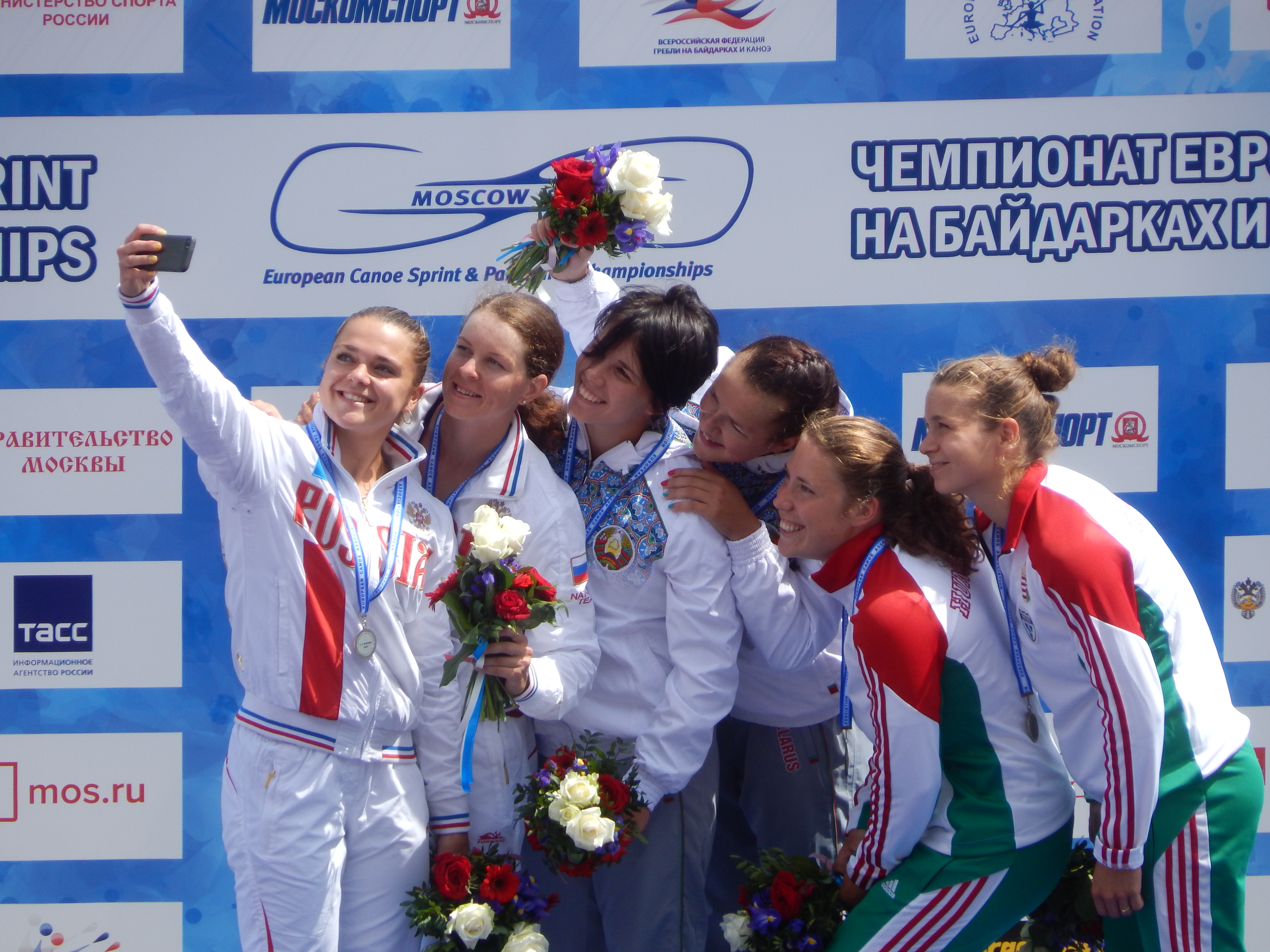

Personal information
- Nationality: Hungarian
- Born: 26 June 1994 (age 32) Győr, Hungary
- Height: 1.67 m (5 ft 6 in)

Sport
- Country: Hungary
- Sport: Canoe sprint
- Club: Györi Vízisport Egyesúlet
Medal record
Women's canoe sprint
Representing Hungary
World Championships
Silver medal – second place	2018 Montemor-o-Velho	C-2 500 m
Silver medal – second place	2019 Szeged	C-2 200 m
Silver medal – second place	2019 Szeged	C-2 500 m
Silver medal – second place	2021 Copenhagen	C-4 500 m
Bronze medal – third place	2022 Dartmouth	C-4 500 m
European Games
Gold medal – first place	2019 Minsk	C-2 500 m
European Championships
Gold medal – first place	2017 Plovdiv	C-2 500 m
Gold medal – first place	2018 Belgrade	C-2 200 m
Gold medal – first place	2018 Belgrade	C-2 500 m
Silver medal – second place	2021 Poznań	C-1 500 m
Silver medal – second place	2021 Poznań	C-2 200 m
Bronze medal – third place	2016 Moscow	C-2 500 m
Bronze medal – third place	2018 Belgrade	C-1 200 m
Bronze medal – third place	2021 Poznań	C-2 500 m

Virág Balla (born 26 June 1994) is a Hungarian sprint canoeist.

She participated at the 2018 ICF Canoe Sprint World Championships, winning a medal.
