= Ekaterina Shliapnikova =

Russian canoeist (born 2005)

Personal information
- Full name: Ekaterina Ivanovna Shliapnikova
- Born: 7 September 2005 (age 21)

Sport
- Country: Russia
- Sport: Canoe sprint
- Events: C–2 500 m, C–4 500 m
Medal record
Women's canoe sprint
Representing ANA
World Championships
Gold medal – first place	2024 Samarkand	C–2 Mix 500 m
Gold medal – first place	2024 Samarkand	C–4 Mix 500 m
Bronze medal – third place	2025 Milan	C-1 200 m

Ekaterina Ivanovna Shliapnikova (Russian: Екатерина Ивановна Шляпникова; born 7 September 2005) is a Russian sprint canoeist. She is a 2024 ICF Canoe Sprint World Championships gold medalist.

== Career ==
In July 2024, Shliapnikova made her international debut at the 2024 ICF World Junior and U23 Canoe Sprint Championships and won gold medals in the U23 C–1 200 metres, and mixed C–2 500 metres events.

In August 2024, she competed at the 2024 ICF Canoe Sprint World Championships and won gold medals in the mixed C–2 500 metres, and C-4 500 metres events.

== Major results ==
=== World championships ===
Year	XC-2 500	XC-4 500
2024	1st place, gold medalist(s)	1st place, gold medalist(s)
