= 2021 ICF Canoe Sprint World Championships =

Canoeing competition

- Venue: Lake Bagsværd
- Location: Copenhagen, Denmark
- Dates: 16–19 September

The 2021 ICF Canoe Sprint World Championships were held from 16 to 19 September 2021 in Copenhagen, Denmark.

In a break with convention, these championships were held in an Olympic year as the COVID-19 pandemic forced a year-long postponement of the Tokyo 2020 Olympic & Paralympic Games.

== Canoe sprint ==
=== Medal table ===
* Host nation (Denmark)

Rank	Nation	Gold	Silver	Bronze	Total
1	Hungary	6	8	4	18
2	Belarus	4	2	2	8
3	Ukraine	3	1	1	5
4	RCF	3	0	5	8
5	Germany	2	2	1	5
6	Spain	2	1	0	3
7	Italy	2	0	1	3
8	Portugal	1	3	0	4
9	Denmark*	1	1	3	5
10	Sweden	1	1	0	2
11	Chile	1	0	1	2
12	Canada	1	0	0	1
12	New Zealand	1	0	0	1
14	Poland	0	3	3	6
15	Czech Republic	0	2	1	3
16	Cuba	0	1	2	3
17	Great Britain	0	1	1	2
17	Slovakia	0	1	1	2
19	Ireland	0	1	0	1
20	Belgium	0	0	1	1
20	Latvia	0	0	1	1
20	Moldova	0	0	1	1
Totals (22 entries)		28	28	29	85

=== Men ===
Non-Olympic events

==== Canoe ====
Event	Gold		Silver		Bronze	
C–1 500 m	Conrad-Robin Scheibner; Germany	1:46.55	Martin Fuksa; Czech Republic	1:47.58	Oleg Tarnovschi; Moldova; Carlo Tacchini; Italy	1:48.50
C–1 1000 m	Conrad-Robin Scheibner; Germany	3:50.73	Martin Fuksa; Czech Republic	3:51.39	Balázs Adolf; Hungary	3:51.69
C–1 5000 m	Balázs Adolf; Hungary	23:08.62	Sebastian Brendel; Germany	23:09.28	Kirill Shamshurin; RCF	23:30.18
C–2 500 m	Italy; Nicolae Craciun; Daniele Santini	1:39.90	Hungary; Jonatán Hajdu; Ádám Fekete	1:40.20	RCF; Viktor Melantyev; Vladislav Chebotar	1:40.92
C–2 1000 m	RCF; Kirill Shamshurin; Vladislav Chebotar	3:32.83	Poland; Wiktor Głazunow; Tomasz Barniak	3:34.38	Cuba; Serguey Torres; Fernando Jorge	3:35.22
C–4 500 m	Ukraine; Vitaliy Vergeles; Andrii Rybachok; Yurii Vandiuk; Taras Mishchuk	1:31.20	Poland; Aleksander Kitewski; Arsen Śliwiński; Michał Łubniewski; Norman Zezula	1:31.31	RCF; Pavel Petrov; Mikhail Pavlov; Viktor Melantyev; Ivan Shtyl	1:31.55

==== Kayak ====
Event	Gold		Silver		Bronze	
K–1 200 m	Andrea Di Liberto; Italy	34.78	Petter Menning; Sweden	34.81	Roberts Akmens; Latvia	34.95
K–1 500 m	Mikita Borykau; Belarus	1:38.87	João Ribeiro; Portugal	1:39.88	Moritz Florstedt; Germany	1:40.04
K–1 1000 m	Fernando Pimenta; Portugal	3:25.82	Bálint Kopasz; Hungary	3:26.49	Aleh Yurenia; Belarus	3:30.47
K–1 5000 m	Bálint Noé; Hungary	20:02.96	Fernando Pimenta; Portugal	20:03.19	Mads Pedersen; Denmark	20:13.25
K–2 500 m	Spain; Marcus Walz; Rodrigo Germade	1:29.04	Germany; Tobias-Pascal Schultz; Martin Hiller	1:30.01	Slovakia; Samuel Baláž; Denis Myšák	1:30.09
K–2 1000 m	Sweden; Dennis Kernen; Martin Nathell	3:13.70	Denmark; Simon Jensen; Morten Graversen	3:14.46	Hungary; Bálint Noé; Tamás Kulifai	3:14.83
K–4 500 m	Ukraine; Oleh Kukharyk; Dmytro Danylenko; Igor Trunov; Ivan Semykin	1:20.19	Slovakia; Samuel Baláž; Denis Myšák; Csaba Zalka; Adam Botek	1:20.59	Czech Republic; Jakub Špicar; Daniel Havel; Jan Vorel; Radek Šlouf	1:20.69

=== Women ===
Non-Olympic classes

==== Canoe ====
Event	Gold		Silver		Bronze	
C–1 200 m	Katie Vincent; Canada	46.52	Antía Jácome; Spain	46.79	Dorota Borowska; Poland	46.90
C–1 500 m	María Mailliard; Chile	2:05.09	Liudmyla Luzan; Ukraine	2:05.77	Alena Nazdrova; Belarus	2:05.86
C–1 5000 m	Volha Klimava; Belarus	26:18.94	Zsófia Kisbán; Hungary	26:37.32	María Mailliard; Chile	26:39.51
C–2 200 m	Spain; Patricia Coco; María Corbera	43.88	Cuba; Yarisleidis Cirilo; Katherin Nuevo	43.89	Hungary; Giada Bragato; Bianka Nagy	44.37
C–2 500 m	Ukraine; Liudmyla Luzan; Anastasiia Chetverikova	1:55.85	Belarus; Alena Nazdrova; Nadzeya Makarchanka	1:57.12	Cuba; Yarisleidis Cirilo; Katherin Nuevo	1:57.70
C–4 500 m	Belarus; Alena Nazdrova; Nadzeya Makarchanka; Aliaksandra Kalaur; Volha Klimava	1:48.62	Hungary; Virág Balla; Kincső Takács; Laura Gönczöl; Réka Opavszky	1:49.50	Ukraine; Liudmyla Luzan; Olena Tsyhankova; Yuliia Kolesnyk; Anastasiia Chetverikova	1:49.79

==== Kayak ====
Event	Gold		Silver		Bronze	
K–1 200 m	Emma Jørgensen; Denmark	39.98	Anna Lucz; Hungary	40.71	Natalia Podolskaya; RCF	40.79
K–1 500 m	Aimee Fisher; New Zealand	1:48.08	Tamara Csipes; Hungary	1:49.00	Emma Jørgensen; Denmark	1:49.85
K–1 1000 m	Alida Dóra Gazsó; Hungary	3:56.04	Lizzie Broughton; Great Britain	3:59.29	Pernille Knudsen; Denmark	4:00.32
K–1 5000 m	Emese Kőhalmi; Hungary	22:57.48	Jennifer Egan; Ireland	22:58.58	Lizzie Broughton; Great Britain	22:59.45
K–2 200 m	RCF; Kristina Kovnir; Anastasiia Dolgova	37.41	Hungary; Blanka Kiss; Anna Lucz	37.65	Poland; Dominika Putto; Katarzyna Kołodziejczyk	37.67
K–2 500 m	Hungary; Danuta Kozák; Tamara Csipes	1:40.52	Belarus; Volha Khudzenka; Maryna Litvinchuk	1:40.70	Belgium; Hermien Peters; Lize Broekx	1:42.15
K–4 500 m	Belarus; Marharyta Makhneva; Nadzeya Liapeshka; Volha Khudzenka; Maryna Litvinchuk	1:32.55	Hungary; Danuta Kozák; Tamara Csipes; Anna Kárász; Alida Dóra Gazsó	1:32.71	RCF; Svetlana Chernigovskaya; Elena Aniushina; Kira Stepanova; Anastasia Panchenko	1:35.30

=== Mixed ===
Non-Olympic classes

Event	Gold		Silver		Bronze	
C–2 200 m	RCF; Irina Andreeva; Ivan Shtyl	39.10	Poland; Michał Łubniewski; Dorota Borowska	39.82	Hungary; Dávid Korisánszky; Kincső Takács	40.02
K–2 200 m	Hungary; Anna Lucz; Kolos Csizmadia	33.94	Portugal; Messias Baptista; Francisca Laia	34.34	Poland; Marta Walczykiewicz; Bartosz Grabowski	34.35

== Paracanoe ==
=== Medal table ===
* Host nation (Denmark)

Rank	Nation	Gold	Silver	Bronze	Total
1	Great Britain	5	5	0	10
2	Ukraine	3	0	2	5
3	Germany	1	2	0	3
4	Brazil	1	1	1	3
5	RCF	1	1	0	2
6	Hungary	1	0	2	3
7	Chile	0	1	1	2
7	Italy	0	1	1	2
7	Spain	0	1	1	2
10	France	0	0	2	2
11	Austria	0	0	1	1
11	Portugal	0	0	1	1
Totals (12 entries)		12	12	12	36

=== Medal events ===
Non-Paralympic classes

Event	Gold		Silver		Bronze	
Men's KL1	Péter Pál Kiss; Hungary	45.94	Luis Carlos Cardoso; Brazil	46.30	Róbert Suba; Hungary	47.86
Men's KL2	Mykola Syniuk; Ukraine	41.77	Federico Mancarella; Italy	41.96	Markus Swoboda; Austria	42.88
Men's KL3	Serhii Yemelianov; Ukraine	39.54	Robert Oliver; Great Britain	40.68	Juan Valle; Spain	41.04
Men's VL1	Artur Chuprov; RCF	1:04.80	Robinson Méndez; Chile	1:15.69	Alessio Bedin; Italy	1:16.40
Men's VL2	Fernando Rufino; Brazil	53.93	Higinio Rivero; Spain	56.21	Norberto Mourão; Portugal	56.54
Men's VL3	Jack Eyers; Great Britain	50.01	Stuart Wood; Great Britain	50.13	Vladyslav Yepifanov; Ukraine	50.55
Women's KL1	Maryna Mazhula; Ukraine	52.69	Edina Müller; Germany	53.74	Katherinne Wollermann; Chile	54.02
Women's KL2	Charlotte Henshaw; Great Britain	48.73	Emma Wiggs; Great Britain	50.70	Katalin Varga; Hungary	52.02
Women's KL3	Laura Sugar; Great Britain	47.77	Hope Gordon; Great Britain	48.25	Nélia Barbosa; France	48.78
Women's VL1	Lillemor Köper; Germany	1:24.32	Esther Bode; Germany	1:36.22	Céline Brulais; France	1:42.18
Women's VL2	Emma Wiggs; Great Britain	57.55	Maria Nikiforova; RCF	1:05.11	Débora Benevides; Brazil	1:06.30
Women's VL3	Charlotte Henshaw; Great Britain	59.33	Hope Gordon; Great Britain	1:00.69	Nataliia Lagutenko; Ukraine	1:02.09
