= María Mailliard =

Chilean canoeist (born 1991)

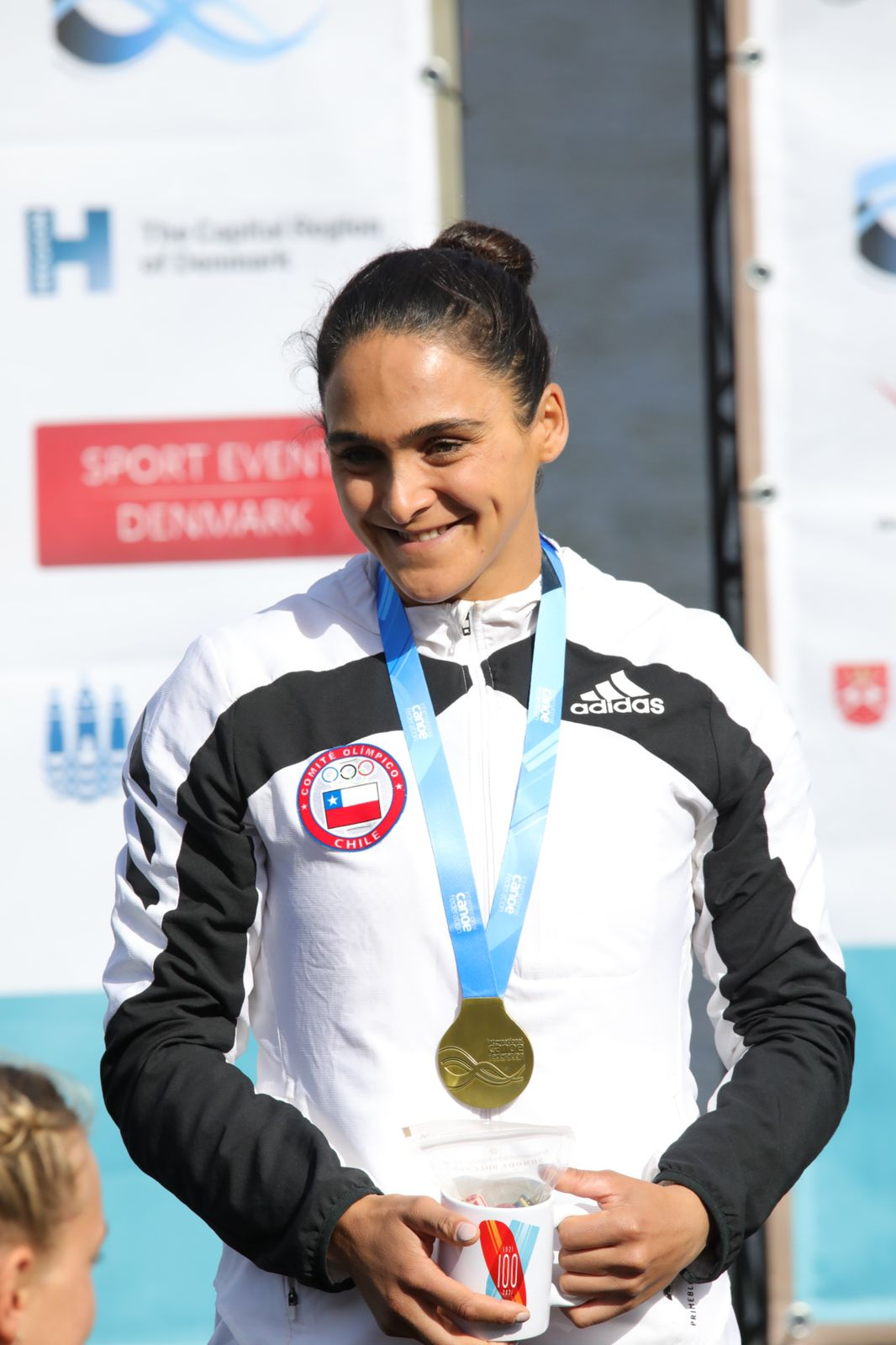
- C1 500W World Champion 2021

Personal information
- Full name: María José Mailliard Rodríguez
- Born: 24 January 1991 (age 35) Quintero, Chile

Sport
- Country: Chile
- Sport: Canoe sprint
- Club: Nautico Piraguistas de Laja
- Coached by: Kiko Martin
Medal record
Women's canoe sprint
Representing Chile
World Championships
Gold medal – first place	2021 Copenhagen	C-1 500 m
Gold medal – first place	2023 Duisburg	C-1 1000 m
Gold medal – first place	2024 Samarkand	C-1 5000 m
Silver medal – second place	2019 Szeged	C-1 5000 m
Silver medal – second place	2022 Dartmouth	C-1 1000 m
Silver medal – second place	2024 Samarkand	C-1 500 m
Bronze medal – third place	2013 Duisburg	C-2 500 m
Bronze medal – third place	2018 Montemor-o-Velho	C-1 5000 m
Bronze medal – third place	2021 Copenhagen	C-1 5000 m
Bronze medal – third place	2022 Dartmouth	C-1 500 m
Bronze medal – third place	2023 Duisburg	C-1 500 m
Pan American Games
Silver medal – second place	2019 Lima	C-1 200 m
Silver medal – second place	2019 Lima	C-2 500 m
Silver medal – second place	2023 Santiago	C-1 200 m
Silver medal – second place	2023 Santiago	C-2 500 m
South American Games
Gold medal – first place	2018 Cochabamba	C-1 200 m
Gold medal – first place	2018 Cochabamba	C-2 500 m
Gold medal – first place	2022 Asunción	C-1 200 m
Gold medal – first place	2022 Asunción	C-2 500 m
Gold medal – first place	2026 Santa Fe	C-1 500 m
Gold medal – first place	2026 Santa Fe	C-2 500 m
Silver medal – second place	2026 Santa Fe	C-1 200 m
Silver medal – second place	2026 Santa Fe	Mixed C-2 500 m
Bolivarian Games
Gold medal – first place	2017 Santa Marta	C-2 500 m

María José Mailliard Rodríguez (born 24 January 1991) is a Chilean sprint canoeist.

She won a bronze medal at the 2013 ICF Canoe Sprint World Championships in the C-2 500 event alongside Nancy Millán. Since then, she has participated in every edition of the championships except 2016 and 2017. She has won three gold medals at the championships in three different events: C-1 500 in 2021; C-1 1000 in 2023; and C-1 5000 in 2024.

She competed at the 2019 Pan American Games where she won silver medals in the C-1 200 metres and C-2 500 metres events, the latter alongside Karen Roco. At the 2023 Pan American Games, she achieved the same results, this time competing in the C-2 500 event with Paula Gómez.

She has represented Chile twice at the Olympic Games. At the 2020 Summer Olympics she participated in the C-1 200 and C-2 500, advancing to the Final B in both. At the 2024 Summer Olympics, she participated again in the same two events, also advancing until the Final B in both.

== Biography ==
She was born in Quintero, and is granddaughter of Lucien Mailliard, a French boxer.

== Major results ==
=== Olympic Games ===
Year	C-1 200	C-2 500
2020	2 FB	1 FB
2024	4 FB	4 FB

=== World championships ===
Year	C-1 200	C-1 500	C-1 1000	С-1 5000	C-2 200	C-2 500
2010	DNS FB	—N/a	—N/a	—N/a	—N/a	—N/a
2013		—N/a	—N/a	—N/a	—N/a	3rd place, bronze medalist(s)
2014		—N/a	—N/a	—N/a	—N/a	6
2015		—N/a	—N/a	—N/a	—N/a	3 FB
2018			—N/a	3rd place, bronze medalist(s)	7 SF	9
2019	4		—N/a	2nd place, silver medalist(s)		8
2021	5	1st place, gold medalist(s)	—N/a	3rd place, bronze medalist(s)	7	4 SF
2022	4	3rd place, bronze medalist(s)	2nd place, silver medalist(s)			
2023	5	3rd place, bronze medalist(s)	1st place, gold medalist(s)			7 SF
2024	—N/a	2nd place, silver medalist(s)	4	1st place, gold medalist(s)	7	—N/a
2025	8 SF	7	—N/a	4	—N/a	—N/a
2026	8 FB	—N/a	—N/a	4	—N/a	6 SF
