= Liudmyla Luzan =

Ukrainian canoeist (born 1997)

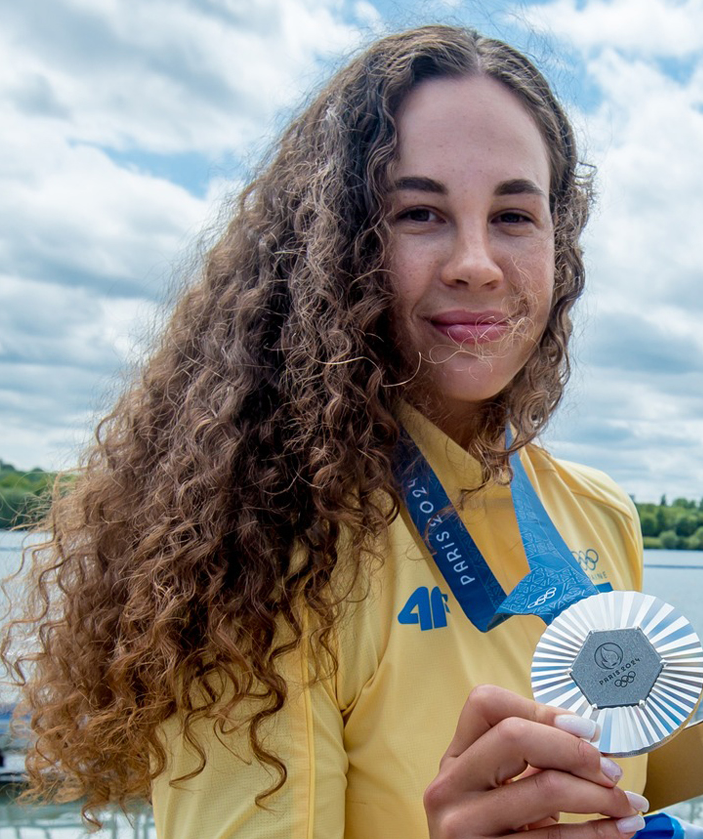
- Luzan at the 2024 Summer Olympics

Personal information
- Full name: Liudmyla Volodymyrivna Luzan
- Nationality: Ukrainian
- Born: 27 March 1997 (age 29) Ivano-Frankivsk, Ukraine
- Height: 1.77 m (5 ft 10 in)

Sport
- Country: Ukraine
- Sport: Canoe sprint
- Club: Dynamo Poltava
- Coached by: Mykola Matsapura
Medal record
Women's canoe sprint
Representing Ukraine
Olympic Games
Silver medal – second place	2020 Tokyo	C-2 500 m
Silver medal – second place	2024 Paris	C-2 500 m
Bronze medal – third place	2020 Tokyo	C-1 200 m
World Championships
Gold medal – first place	2021 Copenhagen	C-2 500 m
Gold medal – first place	2022 Dartmouth	C-1 500 m
Gold medal – first place	2022 Dartmouth	C-1 1000 m
Gold medal – first place	2024 Samarkand	C-1 500 m
Gold medal – first place	2025 Milan	C-1 200 m
Gold medal – first place	2025 Milan	C-1 500 m
Gold medal – first place	2025 Milan	C-2 200 m
Gold medal – first place	2025 Milan	C-2 500 m
Gold medal – first place	2026 Poznań	C-1 200 m
Silver medal – second place	2021 Copenhagen	C-1 500 m
Silver medal – second place	2022 Dartmouth	C-2 500 m
Silver medal – second place	2026 Poznań	C-2 500 m
Bronze medal – third place	2021 Copenhagen	C-4 500 m
European Games
Gold medal – first place	2023 Kraków-Małopolska	C-1 500 m
Gold medal – first place	2023 Kraków-Małopolska	C-2 500 m
Silver medal – second place	2023 Kraków-Małopolska	C-1 200 m
European Championships
Gold medal – first place	2021 Poznań	C-1 500 m
Gold medal – first place	2021 Poznań	C-2 500 m
Gold medal – first place	2022 Munich	C-2 500 m
Gold medal – first place	2025 Racice	C-1 500 m
Gold medal – first place	2026 Montemor-o-Velho	C-1 200 m
Gold medal – first place	2026 Montemor-o-Velho	C-2 200 m
Gold medal – first place	2026 Montemor-o-Velho	C-1 500 m
Gold medal – first place	2026 Montemor-o-Velho	C-2 500 m
Silver medal – second place	2021 Poznań	C-1 200 m
Silver medal – second place	2022 Munich	C-1 200 m
Silver medal – second place	2022 Munich	C-1 500 m
Silver medal – second place	2025 Racice	C-1 200 m
Silver medal – second place	2025 Racice	C-2 200 m
Silver medal – second place	2025 Racice	C-2 500 m
Bronze medal – third place	2018 Belgrade	C-1 500 m
Bronze medal – third place	2021 Poznań	C-2 200 m
Summer Youth Olympics
Silver medal – second place	2014 Nanjing	C-1

Liudmyla Volodymyrivna Luzan (Ukrainian: Людмила Володимирівна Лузан; born 27 March 1997) is a Ukrainian sprint canoeist. She is a two-time silver and a bronze Olympic medalist, eight-time World champion and eight-time European champion.

== Career ==
Luzan competed at the 2014 Summer Youth Olympics where she won a silver medal in the C-1 event. She won her first international senior medal when she placed third at the 2018 European Championships in the C-1 500 metres. Luzan won gold medals at the 2021 European Championships in the C-1 500 metres and the C-2 500 metres with Anastasiia Chetverikova, in addition to a silver medal in the C-1 200 metres and a bronze medal in the C-2 200 metres with Chetverikova. She won the silver medal in the C-2 500 metres event with Chetverikova and the bronze medal in the C-1 200 metres event at the 2020 Summer Olympics. At the 2021 World Championships, Luzan won the gold medal in the C-2 500 metres event with Chetverikova, the silver medal in the C-1 500 metres event and the bronze medal in the C-4 500 metres with Chetverikova, Olena Tsyhankova and Yuliia Kolesnyk.

At the 2022 World Championships, Luzan won gold medals in the C-1 500 metres and the C-1 1000 metres, and a silver medal in the C-2 500 metres with Chetverikova. She won the gold medal in the C-2 500 metres with Chetverikova, and silver medals in the C-1 200 metres and the C-1 500 metres at the 2022 European Championships. At the 2023 European Games, Luzan won gold medals in the C-1 500 metres event and the C-2 500 metres event with Valeriia Tereta, and a silver medal in the C-1 200 metres event. She won the silver medal in the C-2 500 metres event at the 2024 Summer Olympics with Anastasiia Rybachok.

== Major results ==
=== Olympic Games ===
Year	C-1 200	C-2 500
2020	3rd place, bronze medalist(s)	2nd place, silver medalist(s)
2024	DNS FB	2nd place, silver medalist(s)

=== World championships ===
Year	C-1 200	C-1 500	C-1 1000	C-2 200	C-2 500	C-4 500	XC-2 500	XC-4 500
2015	3 FB	—N/a	—N/a	—N/a		—N/a	—N/a	—N/a
2017	7	—N/a	—N/a	—N/a		—N/a	—N/a	—N/a
2018	6 FB	6	—N/a		8	—N/a	—N/a	—N/a
2019			—N/a	6	7	—N/a	—N/a	—N/a
2021	4	2nd place, silver medalist(s)	—N/a		1st place, gold medalist(s)	3rd place, bronze medalist(s)	—N/a	—N/a
2022	9	1st place, gold medalist(s)	1st place, gold medalist(s)		2nd place, silver medalist(s)	DNS	5	—N/a
2023	7	DNS F			8			—N/a
2024	—N/a	1st place, gold medalist(s)		DSQ H	—N/a	—N/a		7
2025	1st place, gold medalist(s)	1st place, gold medalist(s)	—N/a	1st place, gold medalist(s)	1st place, gold medalist(s)		—N/a	—N/a
