= Maria Olărașu =

Moldovan sprint canoeist (born 2000)

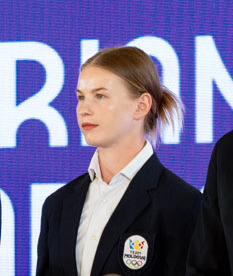
- Olărașu in 2024

Personal information
- Born: 28 May 2000 (age 26) Mingir, Moldova
- Height: 1.57 m (5 ft 2 in)

Sport
- Country: Moldova
- Sport: Canoe
- Coached by: Viktor Reneysky
Medal record
Women's canoe sprint
Representing Moldova
World Championships
| Silver medal – second place | 2024 Samarkand | C-2 200 m |
European Championships
| Bronze medal – third place | 2025 Racice | C-4 Mix 500 m |

Maria Olărașu (born 28 May 2000) is a Moldovan sprint canoeist. She competed solo and with Daniela Cociu at the 2020 Summer Olympics and 2024 Summer Olympics.

== Career ==
Olărașu and Cociu qualified for the 2020 Olympics by winning the women's C-2 500 meters at the 2021 European Canoe Sprint Qualification Regatta in Szeged, Hungary. At the Olympic Women's C-2 500 metres in August 2021, they placed seventh. In the Women's C-1 200 metres, Olărașu placed seventh in the quarterfinals and did not advance to the semifinals.

At the 2023 European Games in Kraków and Małopolska, Olărașu placed fourth in the Women's C-1 500 metres. Olărașu and Mihai Chihaia placed fifth in the Mixed C-2 200 metres and Olărașu and Cociu placed fourth in the Women's C-2 500 metres.

Olărașu and Cociu came in 7th in the Women's C-2 500 metres at the 2023 ICF Canoe Sprint World Championships in Duisburg, Germany, qualifying for the 2024 Olympics.

== Major results ==
=== Olympic Games ===
| Year | C-1 200 | C-2 500 |
|---|---|---|
| 2020 | 7 QF | 7 |
| 2024 | 7 QF | 7 |

=== World championships ===
| Year | C-1 200 | C-1 500 | C-1 1000 | С-1 5000 | C-2 200 | C-2 500 | C-4 500 | XC-2 500 | XC-4 500 |
|---|---|---|---|---|---|---|---|---|---|
| 2017 | 7 H | —N/a | —N/a | —N/a | —N/a | 8 H | —N/a | —N/a | —N/a |
| 2018 | | | —N/a | | 8 | 9 FB | —N/a | —N/a | —N/a |
| 2019 | | | —N/a | | 8 | 4 FB | —N/a | —N/a | —N/a |
| 2021 | | | —N/a | | 4 | 9 | | —N/a | —N/a |
| 2022 | | 7 | | DNF | 6 | 7 | | | —N/a |
| 2023 | | | | | 4 | 7 | 8 | | —N/a |
| 2024 | —N/a | | 9 | | 2nd place, silver medalist(s) | —N/a | —N/a | 4 | 6 |
