= Anastasiia Rybachok =

Ukrainian sprint canoeist

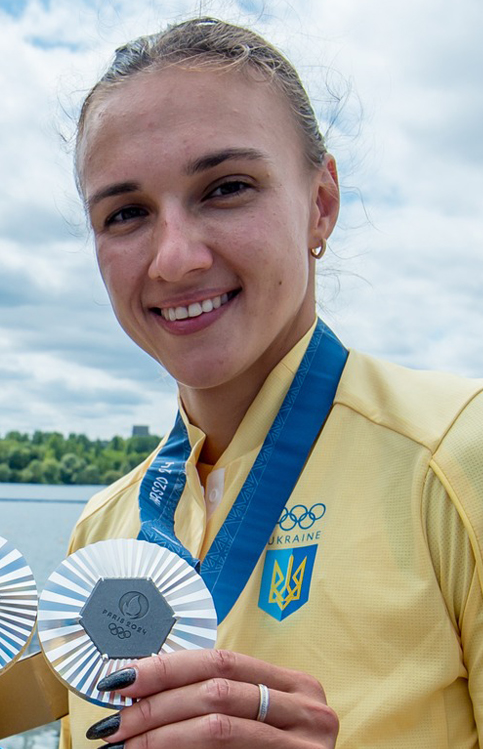
- Rybachok at the 2024 Summer Olympics

Personal information
- Nationality: Ukrainian
- Born: 13 April 1998 (age 28) Kherson, Ukraine
- Height: 1.78 m (5 ft 10 in)

Sport
- Country: Ukraine
- Sport: Canoe sprint
- Coached by: Tsekhovles Vasyl; Chernichenko Oleksandr
Medal record
Women's canoe sprint
Representing Ukraine
Olympic Games
Silver medal – second place	2020 Tokyo	C-2 500 m
Silver medal – second place	2024 Paris	C-2 500 m
World Championships
Gold medal – first place	2021 Copenhagen	C-2 500 m
Silver medal – second place	2022 Dartmouth	C-2 500 m
Silver medal – second place	2026 Poznań	C-2 500 m
Bronze medal – third place	2019 Szeged	C-1 500 m
Bronze medal – third place	2021 Copenhagen	C-4 500 m
European Championships
Gold medal – first place	2021 Poznań	C-2 500 m
Gold medal – first place	2022 Munich	C-2 500 m
Gold medal – first place	2026 Montemor-o-Velho	C-2 200 m
Gold medal – first place	2026 Montemor-o-Velho	C-2 500 m
Bronze medal – third place	2021 Poznań	C-2 200 m

Anastasiia Andriyivna Rybachok (Ukrainian: Анастасія Андріївна Рибачок; born 13 April 1998, until recently Chetverikova, Четверікова) is a Ukrainian sprint canoeist. She is a two-time Olympic medalist and won silver medals in the women's C-2 500 metres events with Liudmyla Luzan at the 2020 Tokyo Olympics and the 2024 Paris Olympics. Rybachok is also a world champion and two-time European champion in the C-2 500 metres. She won her first senior international medal at the 2019 ICF Canoe Sprint World Championships.
