= Daniela Cociu =

Moldovan canoeist (born 2000)

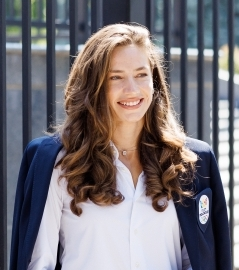
- Cociu in 2024

Personal information
- Born: 4 May 2000 (age 26) Chircăiești, Moldova

Sport
- Country: Moldova
- Sport: Canoe sprint
- Events: C-1 200 m, C-2 200 m, C-2 500 m
- Coached by: Viktor Reneysky
Medal record
Representing Moldova
Women's canoe sprint
World Championships
Silver medal – second place	2024 Samarkand	C-2 200 m
European Championships
Bronze medal – third place	2025 Racice	C-1 5000 m
Bronze medal – third place	2025 Racice	C-4 Mix 500 m
Women's canoe marathon
World Championships
Silver medal – second place	2025 Győr	C-1

Daniela Cociu (born 4 May 2000), is a Moldovan sprint canoeist. She competed along with Maria Olărașu at the 2020 and 2024 Summer Olympics. She is a 2024 ICF Canoe Sprint World Championships silver medalist.

== Career ==
Cociu made her international debut at the 2018 European Junior and U23 Canoe Sprint Championships, in Auronzo di Cadore, Italy, and won a silver medal in the C-2 500 metres and a bronze medal in the C-2 200 metres event. She again competed at the 2019 European Junior and U23 Canoe Sprint Championships and won a silver medal in the C-2 500 metres event.

She competed at the 2021 European Canoe Sprint Qualification Regatta in Szeged, Hungary, and won the C-2 500 meters event, along with Maria Olărașu, and qualified for the 2020 Summer Olympics. In August 2021, she competed in the C-2 500 metres event and finished in seventh place. Cociu and Olărașu became the first women to represent Moldova in canoe sprint at the Olympic Games.

In June 2022, she competed at the 2022 European Junior and U23 Canoe Sprint Championships, in Belgrade, Serbia, and won a gold medal in the C-2 200 metres event, and a silver medal in the C-2 500 metres event.

In June 2023, she competed at the 2023 European Games in Kraków, Poland, and finished in fourth place in the C-2 500 metres event. In July 2023, she competed at the 2023 European Junior and U23 Canoe Sprint Championships, in Auronzo, Italy, and won a gold medal in the C-2 500 metres event. She then competed at the 2023 ICF Canoe Sprint World Championships, in Duisburg, Germany, and finished in seventh place the C-2 500 metres, and qualified for the 2024 Summer Olympics.

At the 2024 Olympics, she competed in the C-2 500 metres event and finished in seventh place. In August 2024, she then competed at the 2024 ICF Canoe Sprint World Championships, in Samarkand, Uzbekistan, and won a silver medal in the C–2 200 metres event with a time of 44.104.

== Major results ==
=== Olympic Games ===
Year	C-1 200	C-2 500
2020	6 QF	7
2024	3 QF	7

=== World championships ===
Year	C-1 200	C-1 500	С-1 5000	C-2 200	C-2 500	C-4 500	XC-4 500
2017		—N/a	—N/a	—N/a	8 H	—N/a	—N/a
2018	8 SF	3 FB	13	8	9 FB	—N/a	—N/a
2019				8	4 FB	—N/a	—N/a
2021				4	9		—N/a
2022				6	7		—N/a
2023				4	7	8	—N/a
2024	—N/a	6	5	2nd place, silver medalist(s)	—N/a	—N/a	6
