= Canoeing at the 2024 Summer Olympics – Women's C-2 500 metres =

Women's C-2 500 metres at the Games of the XXXIII Olympiad
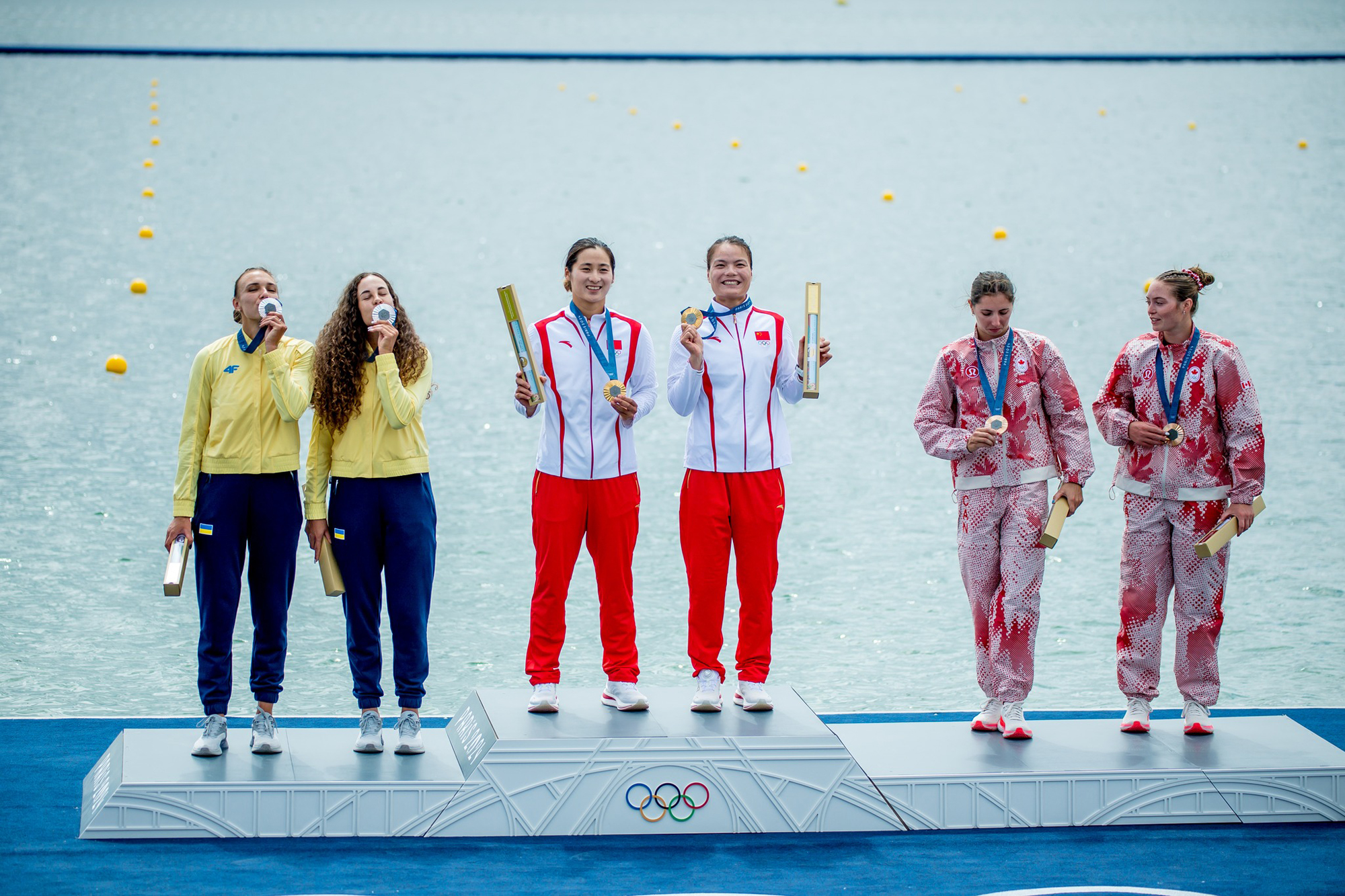
- Venue: National Olympic Nautical Stadium of Île-de-France, Vaires-sur-Marne
- Dates: 6 August 2024 (heats and quarterfinals); 9 August 2024 (semifinals & finals)

Medalists
1st place, gold medalist(s)		Xu Shixiao; Sun Mengya	China
2nd place, silver medalist(s)		Liudmyla Luzan; Anastasiia Rybachok	Ukraine
3rd place, bronze medalist(s)		Sloan MacKenzie; Katie Vincent	Canada

The women's C-2 500 metres sprint canoeing event at the 2024 Summer Olympics took place on 6 and 9 August 2024 at the National Olympic Nautical Stadium of Île-de-France in Vaires-sur-Marne.

== Background ==
This was the second appearance of the event after it was introduced at the 2020 Olympics.

== Competition format ==
Sprint canoeing uses a four-round format for events with at least 11 boats, with heats, quarterfinals, semifinals, and finals. For a 13-boat event, the rounds are as follows:

- Heats: Two heats of 6 and 7 boats each. The top 2 boats in each heat (4 boats total) advance directly to the semifinals, with all others (9 boats) going to the quarterfinals.
- Quarterfinals: Two heats of 4 and 5 boats each. The top 3 boats in each heat (6 boats total) advance to the semifinals, with the remaining 3 boats out of medal contention and competing in the consolation Final B.
- Semifinals: Two heats of 5 boats each. The top 4 boats in each heat (8 boats total) advance to the medal Final A, with the remaining 2 boats out of medal contention and competing in consolation Final B.
- Finals: Final A consists of the top 8 boats, awarding the medals as well as 4th through 8th place. Final B features the remaining 5 boats, awarding 9th through 13th places.

The course is a flatwater course 9 metres wide. The name of the event describes the particular format within sprint canoeing. The "C" format means a canoe, with the canoeist kneeling and using a single-bladed paddle to paddle and steer (as opposed to a kayak, with a seated canoeist, double-bladed paddle, and foot-operated rudder). The "2" is the number of canoeists in each boat. The "500 metres" is the distance of each race.

== Schedule ==
All times are Central European Summer Time (UTC+2)

The event will be held over two days, with two rounds per day.

Date	Time	Round
6 August 2024	11:00; 13:20	Heats; Quarterfinals
9 August 2024	10:30; 12:40	Semifinals; Finals

== Results ==
=== Heats ===
Progression System: 1st-2nd to SF, rest to QF.

==== Heat 1 ====
Rank	Lane	Canoer	Country	Time	Notes
1	5	Xu Shixiao; Sun Mengya	China	1:54.45	SF
2	3	Liudmyla Luzan; Anastasiia Rybachok	Ukraine	1:55.88	SF
3	4	Sylwia Szczerbińska; Dorota Borowska	Poland	1:58.42	QF
4	7	María Mailliard; Paula Gómez	Chile	2:00.28	QF
5	6	Lisa Jahn; Hedi Kliemke	Germany	2:01.15	QF
6	8	Axelle Renard; Eugénie Dorange	France	2:01.68	QF
7	2	Yarisleidis Cirilo Duboys; Yinnoly Lopez Lamadrid	Cuba	2:03.54	QF

==== Heat 2 ====
Rank	Lane	Canoer	Country	Time	Notes
1	6	Sloan MacKenzie; Katie Vincent	Canada	1:54.16	OB, SF
2	4	Antía Jácome; María Corbera	Spain	1:55.63	SF
3	5	Agnes Kiss; Bianka Nagy	Hungary	1:56.82	QF
4	3	Daniela Cociu; Maria Olărașu	Moldova	1:58.81	QF
5	2	Mariya Brovkova; Rufina Iskakova	Kazakhstan	2:00.05	QF
6	7	Ayomide Bello; Beauty Otuedo	Nigeria	2:10.11	QF

=== Quarter Finals ===
Progression System: 1st-3rd to SF, rest eliminated for the medals and go to the B Final.

==== Quarter Final 1 ====
Rank	Lane	Canoer	Country	Time	Notes
1	5	Sylwia Szczerbińska; Dorota Borowska	Poland	1:55.39	SF
2	4	Daniela Cociu; Maria Olărașu	Moldova	1:56.22	SF
3	2	Yarisleidis Cirilo Duboys; Yinnoly Lopez Lamadrid	Cuba	1:56.38	SF
4	3	Lisa Jahn; Hedi Kliemke	Germany	1:56.56	FB
5	6	Ayomide Bello; Beauty Otuedo	Nigeria	2:07.86	FB

==== Quarter Final 2 ====
Rank	Lane	Canoer	Country	Time	Notes
1	5	Agnes Kiss; Bianka Nagy	Hungary	1:59.89	SF
2	4	María Mailliard; Paula Gómez	Chile	2:00.82	SF
3	6	Axelle Renard; Eugénie Dorange	France	2:00.91	SF
4	3	Mariya Brovkova; Rufina Iskakova	Kazakhstan	2:01.76	FB

=== Semi Finals ===
Progression System: 1st-4th to Final A, 5th to Final B.

==== Semi Final 1 ====
Rank	Lane	Canoer	Country	Time	Notes
1	5	Xu Shixiao; Sun Mengya	China	1:53.73	FA, OB
2	4	Antía Jácome; María Corbera	Spain	1:56.55	FA
3	6	Yarisleidis Cirilo Duboys; Yinnoly Lopez Lamadrid	Cuba	1:57.03	FA
4	3	Sylwia Szczerbińska; Dorota Borowska	Poland	1:57.19	FA
5	2	María Mailliard; Paula Gómez	Chile	1:58.10	FB

==== Semi Final 2 ====
Rank	Lane	Canoer	Country	Time	Notes
1	5	Sloan MacKenzie; Katie Vincent	Canada	1:55.34	FA
2	6	Agnes Kiss; Bianka Nagy	Hungary	1:55.51	FA
3	4	Liudmyla Luzan; Anastasiia Rybachok	Ukraine	1:55.62	FA
4	3	Daniela Cociu; Maria Olărașu	Moldova	1:56.66	FA
5	2	Axelle Renard; Eugénie Dorange	France	1:57.14	FB

=== Finals ===
==== Final A ====
Rank	Lane	Canoer	Country	Time	Notes
1st place, gold medalist(s)	5	Xu Shixiao; Sun Mengya	China	1:52.81	OB
2nd place, silver medalist(s)	2	Liudmyla Luzan; Anastasiia Rybachok	Ukraine	1:54.30	
3rd place, bronze medalist(s)	4	Sloan MacKenzie; Katie Vincent	Canada	1:54.36	
4	6	Agnes Kiss; Bianka Nagy	Hungary	1:54.90	
5	1	Sylwia Szczerbińska; Dorota Borowska	Poland	1:55.75	
6	3	Antía Jácome; María Corbera	Spain	1:56.65	
7	8	Daniela Cociu; Maria Olărașu	Moldova	1:56.96	
8	7	Yarisleidis Cirilo Duboys; Yinnoly Lopez Lamadrid	Cuba	2:01.77	

==== Final B ====
Rank	Lane	Canoer	Country	Time	Notes
1	6	Lisa Jahn; Hedi Kliemke	Germany	1:56.48	
2	4	Axelle Renard; Eugénie Dorange	France	1:57.02	
3	3	Mariya Brovkova; Rufina Iskakova	Kazakhstan	1:57.58	
4	5	María Mailliard; Paula Gómez	Chile	2:05.02	
5	2	Ayomide Bello; Beauty Otuedo	Nigeria	2:15.20	
