= 2023 ICF Canoe Sprint World Championships – Women's C-1 200 metres =

Women's C-1 200 metres at the 2023 ICF Canoe Sprint World Championships
- Venue: Sportpark Duisburg
- Location: Duisburg, Germany
- Dates: 23–25 August
- Competitors: 32 from 32 nations
- Winning time: 44.799

Medalists
gold medal	Yarisleidis Cirilo	Cuba
silver medal	Antía Jácome	Spain
bronze medal	Lin Wenjun	China

The women's C-1 200 metres competition at the 2023 ICF Canoe Sprint World Championships in Duisburg took place in Sportpark Duisburg.

== Schedule ==
The schedule is as follows:

Date	Time	Round
Wednesday 23 August 2023	09:20	Heats
Friday 25 August 2023	11:15	Semifinals
Friday 25 August 2023	17:08	Final A
Friday 25 August 2023	18:48	Final B

== Results ==
=== Heats ===
The fastest six boats in each heat, plus the fastest three remaining boats, advanced to the semi-finals.

==== Heat 1 ====
Rank	Canoeist	Country	Time	Notes
1	Dorota Borowska	Poland	46.673	QS
2	Denisa Řáhová	Czech Republic	48.014	QS
3	Beatriz Fernandes	Portugal	48.117	QS
4	Eugenie Dorange	France	48.178	QS
5	Hiva Afzali	Iran	48.386	QS
6	Orasa Thiangkathok	Thailand	48.672	QS
7	Nguyễn Thị Hương	Vietnam	48.716	QS
8	Combe Seck	Senegal	53.585	
9	Nedra Trabelsi	Tunisia	DNS	

==== Heat 2 ====
Rank	Canoeist	Country	Time	Notes
1	Antía Jácome	Spain	45.811	QS
2	Liudmyla Luzan	Ukraine	46.783	QS
3	Annika Loske	Germany	47.725	QS
4	Valdenice Conceição	Brazil	48.260	QS
5	Olympia Della Giustina	Italy	48.355	QS
6	Mio Kobayashi	Japan	48.601	QS
7	Nicol Guzmán	Mexico	50.182	
8	Farah Hewidy	Egypt	55.728	
	Megha Pradeep	India	DNS	

==== Heat 3 ====
Rank	Canoeist	Country	Time	Notes
1	Yarisleidis Cirilo	Cuba	45.296	QS
2	Lin Wenjun	China	45.626	QS
3	Sophia Jensen	Canada	46.404	QS
4	Nevin Harrison	United States	46.843	QS
5	Mariami Kerdikashvili	Georgia	47.441	QS
6	Elena Glizan	Moldova	48.575	QS
7	Anggie Avegno	Ecuador	49.179	QS
8	Gabriele Cerepokaite	Lithuania	49.990	
	Beauty Otuedo	Nigeria	DNS	

==== Heat 4 ====
Rank	Canoeist	Country	Time	Notes
1	María Mailliard	Chile	46.514	QS
2	Vanesa Tot	Croatia	47.241	QS
3	Virág Balla	Hungary	47.287	QS
4	Mariya Brovkova	Kazakhstan	48.342	QS
5	Isabel Evans	United Kingdom	48.954	QS
6	Riska Andriyani	Indonesia	49.245	QS
7	Manuela Gómez	Colombia	49.387	QS
8	Tania Virijac	Romania	54.065	

=== Semifinal ===
The fastest three boats in each semi advanced to the A final.
The next three fastest boats in each semi advanced to the final B.

==== Semifinal 1 ====
Rank	Canoeist	Country	Time	Notes
1	Lin Wenjun	China	45.546	QA
2	Liudmyla Luzan	Ukraine	46.227	QA
3	Dorota Borowsa	Poland	46.277	QA
4	Virág Balla	Hungary	47.015	QB
5	Mariya Brovkova	Kazakhstan	47.074	QB
6	Mariami Kerdikashvili	Georgia	47.583	QB
7	Mio Kobayashi	Japan	48.387	
8	Hiva Afzali	Iran	48.658	
9	Nguyễn Thị Hương	Vietnam	48.801	

==== Semifinal 2 ====
Rank	Canoeist	Country	Time	Notes
1	Sophia Jensen	Canada	45.510	QA
2	Antía Jácome	Spain	45.755	QA
3	Nevin Harrison	United States	46.466	QA
4	Vanesa Tot	Croatia	46.781	QB
5	Eugenie Dorange	France	47.219	QB
6	Beatriz Fernandes	Portugal	48.008	QB
7	Olympia Della Giustina	Italy	48.109	
8	Anggie Avegno	Ecuador	48.206	
9	Riska Andriyani	Indonesia	48.691	

==== Semifinal 3 ====
Rank	Canoeist	Country	Time	Notes
1	Yarisleidis Cirilo	Cuba	45.049	QA
2	María Mailliard	Chile	46.253	QA
3	Annika Loske	Germany	47.262	QA
4	Denisa Řáhová	Czech Republic	47.326	QB
5	Valdenice Conceição	Brazil	47.692	QB
6	Elena Glizan	Moldova	47.697	QB
7	Orasa Thiangkathok	Thailand	48.066	
8	Isabel Evans	United Kingdom	48.471	
9	Manuela Gómez	Colombia	50.323	

=== Final B ===
Competitors in this final raced for positions 10 to 18.

Rank	Canoeist	Country	Time
1	Virág Balla	Hungary	47.173
2	Vanesa Tot	Croatia	47.684
3	Mariami Kerdikashvili	Georgia	47.951
4	Denisa Řáhová	Czech Republic	47.990
5	Mariya Brovkova	Kazakhstan	48.260
6	Valdenice Conceição	Brazil	48.310
7	Eugenie Dorange	France	48.414
8	Beatriz Fernandes	Portugal	48.429
9	Elena Glizan	Moldova	49.184

=== Final A ===
Competitors raced for positions 1 to 9, with medals going to the top three.

Rank	Canoeist	Country	Time
1st place, gold medalist(s)	Yarisleidis Cirilo	Cuba	44.799
2nd place, silver medalist(s)	Antía Jácome	Spain	45.418
3rd place, bronze medalist(s)	Lin Wenjun	China	45.623
4	Nevin Harrison	United States	45.925
5	María Mailliard	Chile	46.293
6	Sophia Jensen	Canada	46.494
7	Liudmyla Luzan	Ukraine	46.832
8	Dorota Borowska	Poland	47.167
9	Annika Loske	Germany	47.516
