= Canoeing at the 2024 Summer Olympics – Women's C-1 200 metres =

Women's C-1 200 metres at the Games of the XXXIII Olympiad
- Venue: National Olympic Nautical Stadium of Île-de-France, Vaires-sur-Marne
- Dates: 8 August 2024 (heats and quarterfinals); 10 August 2024 (semifinals & finals)
- Competitors: 33 from 22 nations
- Winning time: 44.12 WB

Medalists
1st place, gold medalist(s)		Katie Vincent	Canada
2nd place, silver medalist(s)		Nevin Harrison	United States
3rd place, bronze medalist(s)		Yarisleidis Cirilo	Cuba

The women's C-1 200 metres sprint canoeing event at the 2024 Summer Olympics took place on 8 and 10 August 2024 at the National Olympic Nautical Stadium of Île-de-France in Vaires-sur-Marne.

== Background ==
This was the second appearance of the event after its inauguration at the 2020 Olympics.

== Competition format ==
Sprint canoeing uses a four-round format for events with at least 11 boats, with heats, quarterfinals, semifinals, and finals. The details for each round depend on how many boats ultimately enter.

The course is a flatwater course 9 metres wide. The name of the event describes the particular format within sprint canoeing. The "C" format means a canoe, with the canoeist kneeling and using a single-bladed paddle to paddle and steer (as opposed to a kayak, with a seated canoeist, double-bladed paddle, and foot-operated rudder). The "1" is the number of canoeists in each boat. The "200 metres" is the distance of each race.

== Schedule ==
All times are Central European Summer Time (UTC+2)

The event was held over two days, with two rounds per day.

Date	Time	Round
8 August 2024	10:30; 12:40	Heats; Quarterfinals
10 August 2024	11:40; 13:40	Semifinals; Finals

== Results ==
=== Heats ===
Progression System: 1st-2nd to SF, rest to QF.

Heat 1

Rank	Lane	Canoer	Country	Time	Notes
1	5	Dorota Borowska	Poland	47.92	SF
2	6	Valdenice Conceição	Brazil	48.57	SF
3	4	Lisa Jahn	Germany	48.92	QF
4	2	Yinnoly López	Cuba	49.27	QF
5	8	Beauty Otuedo	Nigeria	55.77	QF
6	3	Hermínia Teixeira	São Tomé and Príncipe	59.44	QF
7	7	Raina Taitingfong	Guam	1:05.90	QF

Heat 2

Rank	Lane	Canoer	Country	Time	Notes
1	6	Nevin Harrison	United States	45.70	SF
2	3	Yuliya Trushkina	Individual Neutral Athletes	46.15	SF
3	5	Lin Wenjun	China	46.84	QF
4	8	Anastasiia Rybachok	Ukraine	47.04	QF
5	2	Karen Roco	Chile	47.55	QF
6	4	Manuela Gómez	Colombia	49.87	QF
7	7	Maria Olărașu	Moldova	50.14	QF

Heat 3

Rank	Lane	Canoer	Country	Time	Notes
1	2	Sophia Jensen	Canada	46.80	SF
2	5	Antía Jácome	Spain	47.35	SF
3	3	Nilufar Zokirova	Uzbekistan	48.98	QF
4	8	Daniela Cociu	Moldova	49.14	QF
5	7	Olesia Romasenko	Individual Neutral Athletes	49.83	QF
6	4	Ayomide Bello	Nigeria	49.85	QF
7	6	Combe Seck	Senegal	54.76	QF

Heat 4

Rank	Lane	Canoer	Country	Time	Notes
1	5	Katie Vincent	Canada	47.22	SF
2	2	María Corbera	Spain	47.74	SF
3	7	Ágnes Kiss	Hungary	48.00	QF
4	4	Liudmyla Luzan	Ukraine	48.42	QF
5	6	Eugénie Dorange	France	49.22	QF
6	3	Nguyễn Thị Hương	Vietnam	49.74	QF

Heat 5

Rank	Lane	Canoer	Country	Time	Notes
1	4	Yarisleidis Cirilo	Cuba	45.94	SF
2	5	María Mailliard	Chile	46.50	SF
3	6	Kincső Takács	Hungary	46.60	QF
4	2	Katarzyna Szperkiewicz	Poland	47.49	QF
5	3	Mariya Brovkova	Kazakhstan	48.43	QF
6	7	Maike Jakob	Germany	48.67	QF

=== Quarterfinals ===
Progression System: 1st-2nd to SF, rest out.

Quarterfinal 1

Rank	Lane	Canoer	Country	Time	Notes
1	6	Anastasiia Rybachok	Ukraine	47.11	SF
2	4	Ágnes Kiss	Hungary	47.13	SF
3	3	Katarzyna Szperkiewicz	Poland	47.74	
4	7	Olesia Romasenko	Individual Neutral Athletes	47.92	
5	5	Lisa Jahn	Germany	48.55	
6	8	Nguyễn Thị Hương	Vietnam	49.09	
7	1	Maria Olărașu	Moldova	52.03	
8	2	Hermínia Teixeira	São Tomé and Príncipe	1:00.28	

Quarterfinal 2

Rank	Lane	Canoer	Country	Time	Notes
1	6	Liudmyla Luzan	Ukraine	47.42	SF
2	3	Karen Roco	Chile	47.73	SF
3	5	Nilufar Zokirova	Uzbekistan	48.47	
4	7	Mariya Brovkova	Kazakhstan	48.61	
5	4	Yinnoly López	Cuba	48.76	
6	2	Ayomide Bello	Nigeria	49.24	
7	8	Raina Taitingfong	Guam	1:01.17	

Quarterfinal 3

Rank	Lane	Canoer	Country	Time	Notes
1	5	Kincső Takács	Hungary	47.47	SF
2	4	Lin Wenjun	China	48.13	SF
3	6	Daniela Cociu	Moldova	48.93	
4	2	Manuela Gómez	Colombia	49.54	
5	7	Eugénie Dorange	France	49.67	
6	8	Maike Jakob	Germany	51.40	
7	1	Combe Seck	Senegal	53.82	
8	3	Beauty Otuedo	Nigeria	1:01.82	

=== Semifinals ===
Progression: 1st-4th to Final A, rest to Final B.

Semifinal 1

Rank	Lane	Canoer	Country	Time	Notes
1	3	Yarisleidis Cirilo	Cuba	45.31	FA
2	6	Yuliya Trushkina	Individual Neutral Athletes	45.32	FA
3	4	Sophia Jensen	Canada	45.66	FA
4	8	Lin Wenjun	China	45.70	FA
5	2	María Corbera	Spain	45.78	FB
6	5	Dorota Borowska	Poland	46.52	FB
7	7	Liudmyla Luzan	Ukraine	46.67	FB
8	1	Ágnes Kiss	Hungary	47.01	FB

Semifinal 2

Rank	Lane	Canoer	Country	Time	Notes
1	5	Katie Vincent	Canada	45.01	FA
2	4	Nevin Harrison	United States	45.30	FA
3	6	Antía Jácome	Spain	45.62	FA
4	8	Kincső Takács	Hungary	46.37	FA
5	3	Valdenice Conceição	Brazil	46.46	FB
6	2	María Mailliard	Chile	46.76	FB
7	1	Karen Roco	Chile	47.63	FB
8	7	Anastasiia Rybachok	Ukraine	47.76	FB

=== Finals ===
Final A

Rank	Lane	Canoer	Country	Time	Notes
1st place, gold medalist(s)	4	Katie Vincent	Canada	44.12	WB
2nd place, silver medalist(s)	6	Nevin Harrison	United States	44.13	
3rd place, bronze medalist(s)	5	Yarisleidis Cirilo	Cuba	44.36	
4	2	Antía Jácome	Spain	44.78	
5	3	Yuliya Trushkina	Individual Neutral Athletes	44.83	
6	7	Sophia Jensen	Canada	45.08	
7	1	Lin Wenjun	China	45.23	
8	8	Kincső Takács	Hungary	45.68	

Final B

Rank	Lane	Canoer	Country	Time	Notes
9	5	María Corbera	Spain	45.45	
10	3	Dorota Borowska	Poland	46.36	
11	1	Ágnes Kiss	Hungary	46.54	
12	6	María Mailliard	Chile	46.77	
13	4	Valdenice Conceição	Brazil	46.82	
14	8	Anastasiia Rybachok	Ukraine	47.71	
15	2	Karen Roco	Chile	48.25	
	7	Liudmyla Luzan	Ukraine	DNS	
