= 2026 ICF Canoe Sprint World Championships – Women's C-1 200 metres =

Women's C-1 200 metres at the 2026 ICF Canoe Sprint World Championships
- Venue: Lake Malta
- Location: Poznań, Poland
- Dates: 27–30 August
- Competitors: 33 from 33 nations
- Winning time: 44.40

Medalists
gold medal	Liudmyla Luzan	Ukraine
silver medal	Sophia Jensen	Canada
bronze medal	Nevin Harrison	United States

The women's C-1 200 metres competition at the 2026 ICF Canoe Sprint World Championships in Poznań, Poland took place between 27 and 30 August 2026.

== Records ==
The world best time in the C-1 200 metres for women at the beginning of the competition was as follows:

Women's C-1 200 metres
World Best	43.23	Liudmyla Luzan (UKR)	Szeged (Hungary)

== Schedule ==
The schedule is as follows:

Date	Time	Round
Thursday 27 August 2026	09:20	Heats
Saturday 29 August 2026	09:45	Semifinals
Sunday 30 August 2026	09:25	Final B
Sunday 30 August 2026	10:16	Final A

== Results ==
=== Heats ===
Four heats were held on morning of 27 August 2026.

Qualification rule : First six in each heat (SF) plus three next fastest (qBT) qualify for semi-finals; remainder are eliminated.

Heat 1

Rank	Lane	Name(s)	Nation	Time	Behind	Notes
1	5	Liudmyla Luzan	Ukraine	46.82		SF
2	3	Nevin Harrison	United States	47.94	+1.12	SF
3	6	Antía Jácome	Spain	48.68	+1.86	SF
4	2	Mariya Brovkova	Kazakhstan	49.55	+2.73	SF
5	7	Hedi Kliemke	Germany	49.87	+3.05	SF
6	4	Maria Olărașu	Moldova	52.41	+5.59	SF
7	8	Hermínia Teixeira	São Tomé and Príncipe	54.51	+7.69	qBT
8	9	Ayomide Bello	Nigeria	55.91	+9.09	
9	1	Tamara Pavić	Bosnia and Herzegovina	1:02.40	+15.58	

Heat 2

Rank	Lane	Name(s)	Nation	Time	Behind	Notes
1	5	Yarisleidis Cirilo	Cuba	49.04		SF
2	3	Shuai Changwen	China	50.58	+1.54	SF
3	6	Beatriz Fernandes	Portugal	50.78	+1.74	SF
4	4	Denisa Řáhová	Czech Republic	51.11	+2.07	SF
5	7	Tetiana Smylovenko	Azerbaijan	52.01	+2.97	SF
6	9	Damia Humaira Binte Ridwan	Singapore	54.35	+5.31	SF
7	8	Cai Shu-han	Chinese Taipei	55.97	+6.93	qBT
8	1	Johana Ariana Padilla Rivera	Peru	1:01.87	+12.83	
	2	Herlin Aprilin Lali	Indonesia	DNS		

Heat 3

Rank	Lane	Name(s)	Nation	Time	Behind	Notes
1	5	Sophia Jensen	Canada	48.93		SF
2	6	Valdenice Conceição	Brazil	49.97	+1.04	SF
3	2	Alena Nazdrova	Neutral Athletes B	50.08	+1.15	SF
4	4	Dorota Borowska	Poland	50.53	+1.60	SF
5	3	Vanesa Tot	Croatia	51.97	+3.04	SF
6	1	Radostina Angelova	Bulgaria	52.11	+3.18	SF
7	7	Megha Pradeep	India	55.35	+6.42	qBT
8	8	Combe Seck	Senegal	59.73	+10.80	

Heat 4

Rank	Lane	Name(s)	Nation	Time	Behind	Notes
1	4	Olympia Della Giustina	Italy	50.27		SF
2	3	Shokhsanam Sherzodova	Uzbekistan	51.02	+0.75	SF
3	2	Petra Laura Paragi	Hungary	51.02	+0.75	SF
4	6	Ekaterina Shliapnikova	Neutral Athletes A	51.10	+0.83	SF
5	5	María Mailliard	Chile	52.02	+1.75	SF
6	7	Madison Velásquez	Colombia	54.50	+4.23	SF
7	8	Asmaa Asaad Mabrouk Aly	Egypt	1:00.44	+10.17	
8	1	Chanez Slimane	Algeria	1:04.69	+14.42	

=== Semi finals ===
Three semi finals were held on morning of 29 August 2026.

Qualification rule : First three in each heat to A final (FA) next three in each heat to B final (FB); remainder are eliminated. (1-3 -> FA; 4-6 -> FB; 7... -> el.)

Semi final 1

Rank	Lane	Name(s)	Nation	Time	Behind	Notes
1	4	Nevin Harrison	United States	45.31		FA
2	6	Yarisleidis Cirilo	Cuba	45.72	+0.41	FA
3	5	Olympia Della Giustina	Italy	46.35	+1.04	FA
4	3	Alena Nazdrova	Neutral Athletes B	46.40	+1.09	FB
5	7	Dorota Borowska	Poland	46.92	+1.61	FB
6	2	María Mailliard	Chile	48.03	+2.72	FB
7	1	Damia Humaira Binte Ridwan	Singapore	51.23	+5.92	
8	8	Maria Olărașu	Moldova	51.65	+6.34	
9	9	Hermínia Teixeira	São Tomé and Príncipe	54.72	+9.41	

Semi final 2

Rank	Lane	Name(s)	Nation	Time	Behind	Notes
1	5	Sophia Jensen	Canada	44.72		FA
2	6	Antía Jácome	Spain	45.96	+1.24	FA
3	4	Shokhsanam Sherzodova	Uzbekistan	46.30	+1.58	FA
4	2	Ekaterina Shliapnikova	Neutral Athletes A	46.36	+1.64	FB
5	7	Denisa Řáhová	Czech Republic	47.08	+2.36	FB
6	3	Beatriz Fernandes	Portugal	47.19	+2.47	FB
7	9	Radostina Angelova	Bulgaria	47.58	+2.86	
8	8	Hedi Kliemke	Germany	48.49	+3.77	
9	1	Megha Pradeep	India	49.48	+4.76	

Semi final 3

Rank	Lane	Name(s)	Nation	Time	Behind	Notes
1	5	Liudmyla Luzan	Ukraine	44.87		FA
2	4	Valdenice Conceição	Brazil	46.47	+1.60	FA
3	3	Petra Laura Paragi	Hungary	46.54	+1.67	FA
4	6	Shuai Changwen	China	46.63	+1.76	FB
5	7	Mariya Brovkova	Kazakhstan	47.35	+2.48	FB
6	8	Vanesa Tot	Croatia	49.15	+4.28	FB
7	2	Tetiana Smylovenko	Azerbaijan	49.17	+4.30	
8	9	Madison Velásquez	Colombia	50.86	+5.99	
9	1	Cai Shu-han	Chinese Taipei	51.15	+6.28	

=== Finals ===
The A and B finals were held on the morning of 30 August.

B Final

Rank	Lane	Name(s)	Nation	Time	Behind	Notes
1	7	Dorota Borowska	Poland	47.00		
2	4	Shuai Changwen	China	47.20	+0.20	
3	5	Alena Nazdrova	Neutral Athletes B	47.31	+0.31	
4	6	Ekaterina Shliapnikova	Neutral Athletes A	47.87	+0.87	
5	1	Beatriz Fernandes	Portugal	48.13	+1.13	
6	3	Denisa Řáhová	Czech Republic	48.19	+1.19	
7	8	Mariya Brovkova	Kazakhstan	48.33	+1.33	
8	2	María Mailliard	Chile	49.67	+2.67	
9	9	Vanesa Tot	Croatia	49.70	+2.70	

A final

Rank	Lane	Name(s)	Nation	Time	Behind	Notes
1st place, gold medalist(s)	6	Liudmyla Luzan	Ukraine	44.40		
2nd place, silver medalist(s)	4	Sophia Jensen	Canada	44.90	+0.50	
3rd place, bronze medalist(s)	5	Nevin Harrison	United States	45.04	+0.64	
4	3	Yarisleidis Cirilo	Cuba	45.67	+1.27	
5	7	Antía Jácome	Spain	45.79	+1.39	
6	8	Olympia Della Giustina	Italy	45.93	+1.53	
7	9	Petra Laura Paragi	Hungary	45.97	+1.57	
8	2	Valdenice Conceição	Brazil	46.29	+1.89	
9	1	Shokhsanam Sherzodova	Uzbekistan	46.58	+2.18	
