= 2022 ICF Canoe Sprint World Championships – Women's C-2 200 metres =

Women's C-2 200 metres at the 2022 ICF Canoe Sprint World Championships
- Venue: Lake Banook
- Location: Dartmouth, Canada
- Dates: 6 August
- Competitors: 18 from 9 nations
- Winning time: 45.09

Medalists
gold medal	Yarisleidis Cirilo; Katherin Segura	Cuba
silver medal	Lin Wenjun; Shuai Changwen	China
bronze medal	Giada Bragato; Bianka Nagy	Hungary

The women's C-2 200 metres competition at the 2022 ICF Canoe Sprint World Championships in Dartmouth took place on Lake Banook.

== Schedule ==
The schedule is as follows:

Date	Time	Round
Saturday 6 August 2022	12:14	Final

== Results ==
With fewer than ten competitors entered, this event was held as a direct final.

Rank	Canoeist	Country	Time
1st place, gold medalist(s)	Yarisleidis Cirilo; Katherin Segura	Cuba	45.09
2nd place, silver medalist(s)	Lin Wenjun; Shuai Changwen	China	45.24
3rd place, bronze medalist(s)	Giada Bragato; Bianka Nagy	Hungary	47.59
4	Lisa Jahn; Sophie Koch	Germany	48.01
5	Sophia Jensen; Julia Osende	Canada	48.35
6	Daniela Cociu; Maria Olărașu	Moldova	48.40
7	Nevin Harrison; Ten Kusaka	United States	49.36
8	Magda Stanny; Aleksandra Jacewicz	Poland	49.94
9	Paula Gómez; Karen Roco	Chile	53.19
