= 2023 ICF Canoe Sprint World Championships – Women's C-4 500 metres =

Women's C-4 500 metres at the 2023 ICF Canoe Sprint World Championships
- Venue: Sportpark Duisburg
- Location: Duisburg, Germany
- Dates: 24–27 August
- Competitors: 40 from 10 nations
- Winning time: 1:47.186

Medalists
gold medal	Shuai Changwen; Lin Wenjun; Li Li; Wan Yin	China
silver medal	Lisa Jahn; Hedi Kliemke; Annika Loske; Ophelia Preller	Germany
bronze medal	Sophia Jensen; Sloan MacKenzie; Jacy Grant; Julia Lilley	Canada

The women's C-4 500 metres competition at the 2023 ICF Canoe Sprint World Championships in Duisburg took place in Sportpark Duisburg.

== Schedule ==
The schedule is as follows:

Date	Time	Round
Thursday 24 August 2023	11:07	Heats
Saturday 26 August 2023	16:20	Semifinals
Sunday 27 August 2023	12:17	Final A

== Results ==
=== Heats ===
The fastest three boats in each heat advanced directly to the final. The next four fastest boats in each heat, plus the fastest remaining boat advanced to the semifinal.

==== Heat 1 ====
Rank	Canoeist	Country	Time	Notes
1	Shuai Changwen; Lin Wenjun; Li Li; Wan Yin	China	1:46.705	QF
2	Amelia Braun; Katarzyna Szperkiewicz; Julia Walczak; Julia Walczak	Poland	1:49.628	QF
3	Rufina Iskakova; Margarita Torlopova; Ulyana Kisseleva; Mariya Brovkova	Kazakhstan	1:49.858	QF
4	Daniela Cociu; Andreea Paraschiv; Elena Glizan; Maria Olărașu	Moldova	1:59.105	QS
5	Azusa Murphy; Emma Albrecht; Audrey Harper; Andreea Ghizila	United States	1:59.943	QS
6	Kaveri Dimar; Neha Devi Leichonbam; Megha Pradeep; Shivani Verma	India	2:00.609	QS

==== Heat 2 ====
Rank	Canoeist	Country	Time	Notes
1	Maria Moreno; Claudia Couto; Valeria Oliveira; Antía Otero	Spain	1:48.144	QF
2	Sophia Jensen; Sloan MacKenzie; Jacy Grant; Julia Lilley	Canada	1:48.549	QF
3	Giada Bragato; Zsófia Csorba; Réka Opavszky; Bianka Nagy	Hungary	1:50.205	QF
4	Lisa Jahn; Hedi Kliemke; Annika Loske; Ophelia Preller	Germany	1:53.292	QS

=== Semifinal ===
The fastest three boats advanced to the final.

Rank	Canoeist	Country	Time	Notes
1	Lisa Jahn; Hedi Kliemke; Annika Loske; Ophelia Preller	Germany	1:49.757	QF
2	Azusa Murphy; Emma Albrecht; Audrey Harper; Andreea Ghizila	United States	1:52.789	QF
3	Daniela Cociu; Andreea Paraschiv; Elena Glizan; Maria Olărașu	Moldova	1:54.534	QF
4	Kaveri Dimar; Neha Devi Leichonbam; Megha Pradeep; Shivani Verma	India	1:58.224	

=== Final ===
Competitors raced for positions 1 to 9, with medals going to the top three.

Rank	Canoeist	Country	Time
1st place, gold medalist(s)	Shuai Changwen; Lin Wenjun; Li Li; Wan Yin	China	1:47.186
2nd place, silver medalist(s)	Lisa Jahn; Hedi Kliemke; Annika Loske; Ophelia Preller	Germany	1:47.780
3rd place, bronze medalist(s)	Sophia Jensen; Sloan MacKenzie; Jacy Grant; Julia Lilley	Canada	1:48.143
4	Giada Bragato; Zsófia Csorba; Réka Opavszky; Bianka Nagy	Hungary	1:48.761
5	Maria Moreno; Claudia Couto; Valeria Oliveira; Antía Otero	Spain	1:51.378
6	Amelia Braun; Katarzyna Szperkiewicz; Julia Walczak; Julia Walczak	Poland	1:51.478
7	Rufina Iskakova; Margarita Torlopova; Ulyana Kisseleva; Mariya Brovkova	Kazakhstan	1:52.911
8	Daniela Cociu; Andreea Paraschiv; Elena Glizan; Maria Olărașu	Moldova	1:52.942
9	Azusa Murphy; Emma Albrecht; Audrey Harper; Andreea Ghizila	United States	1:59.312
