= Moldova at the 2024 Summer Olympics =

- IOC code: MDA
- NOC: National Olympic Committee of the Republic of Moldova
- Website: www.olympic.md (in Romanian)

in Paris, France 26 July 2024 – 11 August 2024
- Competitors: 26 (14 men and 16 women) in 10 sports
- Flag bearers (opening): Dan Olaru & Alexandra Mîrca
- Flag bearers (closing): Anastasia Nichita & Serghei Tarnovschi
- Medals Ranked 72nd: Gold 0 Silver 1 Bronze 3 Total 4

Summer Olympics appearances (overview)
- 1996; 2000; 2004; 2008; 2012; 2016; 2020; 2024

Other related appearances
- Russian Empire (1900–1912); Romania (1924–1936); Soviet Union (1952–1988); Unified Team (1992)

Moldova, officially the Republic of Moldova, competed at the 2024 Summer Olympics in Paris, France, from 26 July to 11 August 2024. It was the nation's eighth consecutive appearance at the Summer Olympics in the post-Soviet era.

Denis Vieru won the country's first Olympic medal in judo.

== Medalists ==
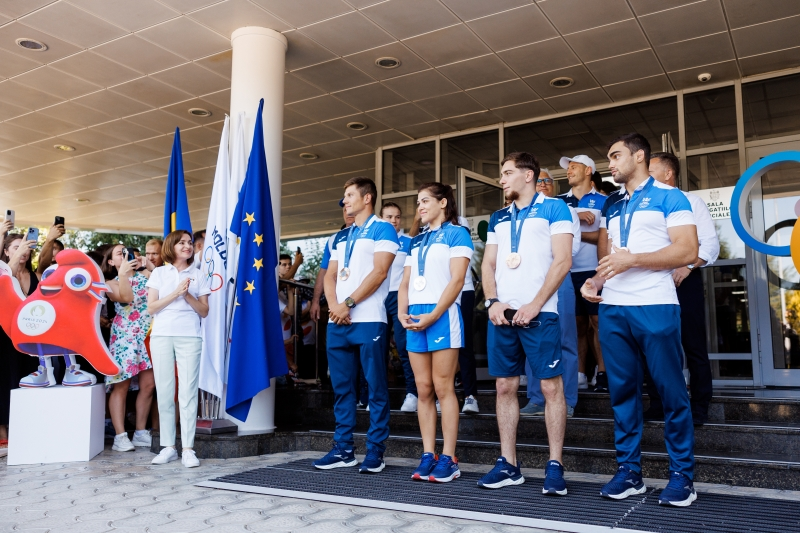
Serghei Tarnovschi, Anastasia Nichita, Denis Vieru and Adil Osmanov after the Olympic Games 2024

Medal	Name	Sport	Event	Date
Silver	Anastasia Nichita	Wrestling	Women's –57 kg	9 August
Bronze	Denis Vieru	Judo	Men's –66 kg	28 July
Bronze	Adil Osmanov	Judo	Men's –73 kg	29 July
Bronze	Serghei Tarnovschi	Canoeing	Men's C-1 1000 m	9 August

Medals by sport
Sport	1st place, gold medalist(s)	2nd place, silver medalist(s)	3rd place, bronze medalist(s)	Total
Canoeing	0	0	1	1
Judo	0	0	2	2
Wrestling	0	1	0	1
Total	0	1	3	4

Medals by gender
Gender	1st place, gold medalist(s)	2nd place, silver medalist(s)	3rd place, bronze medalist(s)	Total
Male	0	0	3	3
Female	0	1	0	1
Mixed	0	0	0	0
Total	0	1	3	4

Medals by date
Date	1st place, gold medalist(s)	2nd place, silver medalist(s)	3rd place, bronze medalist(s)	Total
28 July	0	0	1	1
29 July	0	0	1	1
9 August	0	1	1	2
Total	0	1	3	4

== Competitors ==
The following is the list of number of competitors in the Games.

Sport	Men	Women	Total
Archery	1	1	2
Athletics	2	3	5
Canoeing	1	2	3
Equestrian	0	1	1
Judo	3	0	3
Shooting	0	1	1
Swimming	1	1	2
Table tennis	1	0	1
Weightlifting	1	0	1
Wrestling	4	3	7
Total	14	12	26

== Archery ==
Two Moldovan archers qualified for the men's individual recurve by finishing fourth and obtaining one of two available spots as the highest-ranked eligible nation at the 2023 European Games in Kraków, Poland; and for the women's individual through the 2024 Final Qualification Tournament in Antalya, Turkey.

Athlete	Event	Ranking round		Round of 64	Round of 32	Round of 16	Quarterfinals	Semifinals	Final / BM	
Athlete	Event	Score	Seed	Opposition Score	Opposition Score	Opposition Score	Opposition Score	Opposition Score	Opposition Score	Rank
Dan Olaru	Men's individual	671	18	Quốc Phong (VIE); W 6–0	Arcila (COL); L 2–6	Did not advance				
Alexandra Mîrca	Women's individual	631	51	Mashayikh (MAS); L 0–6	Did not advance					
Dan Olaru; Alexandra Mîrca	Mixed team	1302	22	—N/a		Did not advance				22

== Athletics ==
Moldovan track and field athletes qualified for Paris 2024, by receiving the direct universality spots in the following event:

Key

- Note–Ranks given for track events are within the athlete's heat only
- Q = Qualified for the next round
- q = Qualified for the next round as a fastest loser or, in field events, by position without achieving the qualifying target
- NR = National record
- N/A = Round not applicable for the event
- Bye = Athlete not required to compete in round

Field events

Athlete	Event	Heat		Final	
Athlete	Event	Result	Rank	Result	Rank
Serghei Marghiev	Men's hammer throw	73.46	18	Did not advance	
Andrian Mardare	Men's javelin throw	84.13	9 Q	80.10	12
Zalina Petrivskaya	Women's hammer throw	67.84	22	Did not advance	
Dimitriana Bezede	Women's shot put	16.35	27	Did not advance	
Alexandra Emilianov	Women's discus throw	64.33	6 Q	58.08	11

== Canoeing ==
=== Sprint ===
Moldovan canoeists qualified two boats in the following distances for the Games through the 2023 ICF Canoe Sprint World Championships in Duisburg, Germany.

Athlete	Event	Heats		Quarterfinals		Semifinals		Final	
Athlete	Event	Time	Rank	Time	Rank	Time	Rank	Time	Rank
Serghei Tarnovschi	Men's C-1 1000 m	3:49.27	1 Q SF	Bye		3:45.33	2 Q FA	3:44.68	3rd place, bronze medalist(s)
Daniela Cociu	Women's C-1 200 m	49.14	4 Q QF	48.93	3	Did not advance			
Maria Olărașu	Women's C-1 200 m	50.14	7 Q QF	52.03	7	Did not advance			
Daniela Cociu; Maria Olărașu	Women's C-2 500 m	1:58.81	4 Q QF	1:56.22	2 Q SF	1:56.66	4 Q FA	1:56.96	7

Qualification Legend: FA = Qualify to final (medal); FB = Qualify to final B (non-medal)

== Equestrian ==
Moldova entered one equestrian to compete at Paris 2024. Alisa Glinka earned a spot at the Paris Olympics after finishing 1st in the Group C (Central & Eastern Europe; Central Asia), signifying the nation's Olympic debut in the sport. Glinka was suspended because of a positive doping test, which led to an individual spot for Hungary, but on June 24th the suspension was lifted which led back to the spot for Moldova.

=== Dressage ===
Athlete	Horse	Event	Grand Prix		Grand Prix Freestyle		Overall	
Athlete	Horse	Event	Score	Rank	Technical	Artistic	Score	Rank
Alisa Glinka	Abercrombie	Individual	66.056	53	Did not advance			

Qualification Legend: Q = Qualified for the final; q = Qualified for the final as a lucky loser

== Judo ==
Moldova qualified three judokas for the following weight classes at the Games. Denis Vieru (men's half-lightweight weight, 66 kg), Adil Osmanov (men's lightweight, 73 kg) and Mihail Latișev (men's half-middleweight, 81 kg) got qualified via quota based on IJF World Ranking List and continental quota based on Olympic point rankings.

Athlete	Event	Round of 64	Round of 32	Round of 16	Quarterfinals	Semifinals	Repechage	Final / BM	
Athlete	Event	Opposition Result	Opposition Result	Opposition Result	Opposition Result	Opposition Result	Opposition Result	Opposition Result	Rank
Denis Vieru	Men's –66 kg	—N/a	Bye	Saha (FIN); W 01–00	Bunčić (SRB); W 10–00	Abe (JPN); L 00–01	—N/a	Khyar (FRA); W 01–00	3rd place, bronze medalist(s)
Adil Osmanov	Men's –73 kg	—N/a	Yonezuka (USA); W 10–00	Yuldoshev (UZB); W 10–00	Erdenebayar (MGL); W 10–00	Gaba (FRA); L 00–10	—N/a	Lombardo (ITA); W 10–00	3rd place, bronze medalist(s)
Mihail Latișev	Men's –81 kg	Bye	Grigalashvili (GEO); L 00–10	Did not advance					=17

== Shooting ==
Moldovan shooter Anna Dulce achieved one quota place for Olympic Games based on her result at the 2024 European Championships.

Athlete	Event	Qualification		Final	
Athlete	Event	Points	Rank	Points	Rank
Anna Dulce	Women's 10 m air pistol	569	28	Did not advance	

== Swimming ==
Moldova sent two swimmers to compete at the 2024 Paris Olympics.

Athlete	Event	Heat		Semifinal		Final	
Athlete	Event	Time	Rank	Time	Rank	Time	Rank
Pavel Alovațki	Men's 400 m freestyle	3:59.77	31	Did not advance			
Tatiana Salcuțan	Women's 200 m backstroke	2:13.20	23	Did not advance			

== Table tennis ==
Moldova entered one athlete into the games. Vladislav Ursu secured his spot at the Games via winning the third available places for men's single event, through the 2024 European Qualification Tournament in Sarajevo, Bosnia and Herzegovina, marking the country's debut in the sport.

Athlete	Event	Preliminary	Round 1	Round 2	Round of 16	Quarterfinals	Semifinals	Final / BM	
Athlete	Event	Opposition Result	Opposition Result	Opposition Result	Opposition Result	Opposition Result	Opposition Result	Opposition Result	Rank
Vladislav Ursu	Men's singles	K Jha (USA); L 0–4	Did not advance						

== Weightlifting ==
Moldova entered one weightlifter into the Olympic competition. Marin Robu (men's 89 kg) secured one of the top ten slots in his weight divisions based on the IWF Olympic Qualification Rankings.

Athlete	Event	Snatch		Clean & Jerk		Total	Rank
Athlete	Event	Result	Rank	Result	Rank	Total	Rank
Marin Robu	Men's –89 kg	175	3	208	4	383	4

== Wrestling ==
Moldova qualified six wrestlers into the Olympic competition. Two wrestlers qualified by virtue of top five results through the 2023 World Championships in Belgrade, Serbia; one wrestler qualified through the 2024 European Qualification Tournament in Baku, Azerbaijan; and two wrestlers qualified through the 2024 World Qualification Tournament in Istanbul, Turkey, however, Radu Lefter and Maxim Saculțan joined the squads due to reallocations of Individual Neutral Athletes quotas.

Key:

- VT (ranking points: 5–0 or 0–5) – Victory by fall.
- VB (ranking points: 5–0 or 0–5) – Victory by injury (VF for forfeit, VA for withdrawal or disqualification)
- PP (ranking points: 3–1 or 1–3) – Decision by points – the loser with technical points.
- PO (ranking points: 3–0 or 0–3) – Decision by points – the loser without technical points.
- ST (ranking points: 4–0 or 0–4) – Great superiority – the loser without technical points and a margin of victory of at least 8 (Greco-Roman) or 10 (freestyle) points.
- SP (ranking points: 4–1 or 1–4) – Technical superiority – the loser with technical points and a margin of victory of at least 8 (Greco-Roman) or 10 (freestyle) points.

Men's freestyle

Athlete	Event	Round of 16	Quarterfinal	Semifinal	Repechage	Final / BM	
Athlete	Event	Opposition Result	Opposition Result	Opposition Result	Opposition Result	Opposition Result	Rank
Maxim Saculțan	Men's −65 kg	Kiyooka (JPN); L 0–10	Did not advance		Rivera (PUR); L 4–15	Did not advance	9
Radu Lefter	Men's −97 kg	Baranowski (POL); L 2–8	Did not advance				13

Men's Greco-Roman

Athlete	Event	Round of 32	Round of 16	Quarterfinal	Semifinal	Repechage	Final / BM	
Athlete	Event	Opposition Result	Opposition Result	Opposition Result	Opposition Result	Opposition Result	Opposition Result	Rank
Victor Ciobanu	Men's −60 kg	Bye	Se-ung (PRK); L 3–10^{F}	Did not advance				15
Valentin Petic	Men's −67 kg	—N/a	Almanza Truyol (CHI); W 4–0	Jafarov (AZE); L 1–3	Did not advance			7

Women's freestyle

Athlete	Event	Round of 16	Quarterfinal	Semifinal	Repechage	Final / BM	
Athlete	Event	Opposition Result	Opposition Result	Opposition Result	Opposition Result	Opposition Result	Rank
Mariana Drăguțan	Women's −53 kg	Ana (ROU); L 0–5	Did not advance				14
Anastasia Nichita	Women's −57 kg	Paruszewski (GER); W 9–0	Penalber (BRA); W 5^{F}–0	Kexin (CHN); W 2^{F}–7	Bye	Sakurai (JPN); L 0–6	2nd place, silver medalist(s)
Irina Rîngaci	Women's −68 kg	Sol-gum (PRK); L 6–10	Did not advance				10

== See also ==
- Moldova at the 2024 Winter Youth Olympics
