= Cuba at the 2024 Summer Olympics =

- IOC code: CUB
- NOC: Cuban Olympic Committee

in Paris, France 26 July 2024 – 11 August 2024
- Competitors: 61 (34 men & 27 women) in 16 sports
- Flag bearers (opening): Julio César La Cruz & Idalys Ortiz
- Flag bearers (closing): Yarisleidis Cirilo & Mijaín López
- Medals Ranked 32nd: Gold 2 Silver 1 Bronze 6 Total 9

Summer Olympics appearances (overview)
- 1900; 1904; 1908–1920; 1924; 1928; 1932–1936; 1948; 1952; 1956; 1960; 1964; 1968; 1972; 1976; 1980; 1984–1988; 1992; 1996; 2000; 2004; 2008; 2012; 2016; 2020; 2024

Cuba competed at the 2024 Summer Olympics in Paris from 26 July to 11 August 2024. It was the nation's twenty-second appearance at the Summer Olympics. The 2024 Cuban delegation was smaller than their 2020 delegation, which was previously their smallest delegation since 1964. It was also the second time since 1964 that the Cuban delegation had fewer than one hundred athletes.

Cuba left Paris with nine medals, securing their worst performance since 1972, when they won 8 medals. The two gold medals were also Cuba's lowest tally since 1968, when they won none. This was the first time since 1972 that Cuba failed to win at least 10 medals, the first time since 1968 where Cuba won two or less gold medals, and the first time since 1960 that Cuba did not win a medal in Athletics. All of the above information excludes the boycotted games of 1984 and 1988.

Despite the disappointing performance, one of the two gold medals was won by Mijain Lopez in the Wrestling Men's Greco-Roman 130 kg, who became the first person (male or female) in Olympic (winter or summer) history to win five consecutive gold medals in the same individual event. He retired immediately after his gold medal bout.

== Medalists ==
| Medal | Name | Sport | Event | Date |
|---|---|---|---|---|
| Gold | Mijaín López | Wrestling | Men's Greco-Roman 130 kg | 6 August |
| Gold | Erislandy Álvarez | Boxing | Men's 63.5 kg | 7 August |
| Silver | Yusneylys Guzmán | Wrestling | Women's freestyle 50 kg | 7 August |
| Bronze | Arlen López | Boxing | Men's 80 kg | 4 August |
| Bronze | Gabriel Rosillo | Wrestling | Men's Greco-Roman 97 kg | 7 August |
| Bronze | Luis Orta | Wrestling | Men's Greco-Roman 67 kg | 8 August |
| Bronze | Yarisleidis Cirilo | Canoeing | Women's C-1 200 m | 10 August |
| Bronze | Rafael Alba | Taekwondo | Men's +80 kg | 10 August |
| Bronze | Milaimys Marín | Wrestling | Women's freestyle 76 kg | 11 August |

Medals by sport
| Sport | 1st place, gold medalist(s) | 2nd place, silver medalist(s) | 3rd place, bronze medalist(s) | Total |
| Wrestling | 1 | 1 | 3 | 5 |
| Boxing | 1 | 0 | 1 | 2 |
| Canoeing | 0 | 0 | 1 | 1 |
| Taekwondo | 0 | 0 | 1 | 1 |
| Total | 2 | 1 | 6 | 9 |

Medals by gender
| Gender | 1st place, gold medalist(s) | 2nd place, silver medalist(s) | 3rd place, bronze medalist(s) | Total |
| Male | 2 | 0 | 4 | 6 |
| Female | 0 | 1 | 2 | 3 |
| Mixed | 0 | 0 | 0 | 0 |
| Total | 2 | 1 | 6 | 9 |

Medals by date
| Date | 1st place, gold medalist(s) | 2nd place, silver medalist(s) | 3rd place, bronze medalist(s) | Total |
| 4 August | 0 | 0 | 1 | 1 |
| 6 August | 1 | 0 | 0 | 1 |
| 7 August | 1 | 1 | 1 | 3 |
| 8 August | 0 | 0 | 1 | 1 |
| 10 August | 0 | 0 | 2 | 2 |
| 11 August | 0 | 0 | 1 | 1 |
| Total | 2 | 1 | 6 | 9 |

== Competitors ==
The following is the list of number of competitors in the Games.

| Sport | Men | Women | Total |
|---|---|---|---|
| Archery | 1 | 0 | 1 |
| Athletics | 7 | 11 | 18 |
| Boxing | 5 | 0 | 5 |
| Canoeing | 1 | 2 | 3 |
| Cycling | 0 | 1 | 1 |
| Diving | 0 | 2 | 2 |
| Judo | 2 | 2 | 4 |
| Modern pentathlon | 1 | 0 | 1 |
| Rowing | 1 | 1 | 2 |
| Shooting | 2 | 2 | 4 |
| Swimming | 1 | 1 | 2 |
| Table tennis | 2 | 1 | 3 |
| Taekwondo | 1 | 1 | 2 |
| Volleyball | 2 | 0 | 2 |
| Weightlifting | 0 | 1 | 1 |
| Wrestling | 8 | 2 | 10 |
| Total | 34 | 27 | 61 |

== Archery ==
Cuba qualified one archer for the 2024 Summer Olympics men's individual recurve competition through the 2024 Olympic Individual Qualification Tournament, held in Antalya, Turkey.

| Athlete | Event | Ranking round | | Round of 64 | Round of 32 | Round of 16 | Quarterfinals | Semifinals | Final / BM | |
| Athlete | Event | Score | Seed | Opposition Score | Opposition Score | Opposition Score | Opposition Score | Opposition Score | Opposition Score | Rank |
|---|---|---|---|---|---|---|---|---|---|---|
| Hugo Franco | Men's individual | 669 | 21 | Martínez (MEX); W 7–3 | Wang (CHN); L 2–6 | Did not advance | | | | |

== Athletics ==
Cuban track and field athletes achieved their entry standards for Paris 2024, either by passing the direct qualifying mark (or time for track and road races) or by world ranking, in the following events (a maximum of 3 athletes each):

Key

- Note–Ranks given for track events are within the athlete's heat only
- Q = Qualified for the next round
- q = Qualified for the next round as a fastest loser or, in field events, by position without achieving the qualifying target
- NR = National record
- N/A = Round not applicable for the event
- Bye = Athlete not required to compete in round

Track & road events

| Athlete | Event | Heat | | Repechage | | Semifinal | | Final | |
| Athlete | Event | Result | Rank | Result | Rank | Result | Rank | Result | Rank |
|---|---|---|---|---|---|---|---|---|---|
| Reynaldo Espinosa | Men's 100 m | 10.11 | 3 Q | —N/a | | 10.21 | 9 | Did not advance | |
| Yunisleidy García | Women's 100 m | 11.37 | 5 | —N/a | | Did not advance | | | |
| Roxana Gómez | Women's 400 m | 50.38 SB | 2 Q | Bye | | 50.48 | 5 | Did not advance | |
| Rose Mary Almanza | Women's 800 m | 2:00.36 | 6 | 2:01.54 | 1 Q | 1:58.73 | 5 | Did not advance | |
| Daily Cooper Gaspar | Women's 800 m | 1:58.88 | 1 Q | Bye | | 1:58.39 | 3 | Did not advance | |
| Rose Mary Almanza; Daily Cooper Gaspar; Sahily Diago; Roxana Gómez; Melissa Padrón; Lisneidy Veitía | Women's 4 × 400 m relay | 3:33.99 | 8 | —N/a | | | | Did not advance | |

Field events

| Athlete | Event | Qualification | | Final | |
| Athlete | Event | Result | Rank | Result | Rank |
|---|---|---|---|---|---|
| Luis Zayas | Men's high jump | 2.24 | 14 | Did not advance | |
| Alejandro Parada | Men's long jump | 7.62 | 25 | Did not advance | |
| Cristian Nápoles | Men's triple jump | 16.67 | 18 | Did not advance | |
| Lázaro Martínez | Men's triple jump | 16.79 | 11 q | 17.34 SB | 8 |
| Andy Hechavarría | Men's triple jump | 16.70 | 17 | Did not advance | |
| Mario Díaz | Men's discus throw | 60.92 | 26 | Did not advance | |
| Leyanis Pérez | Women's triple jump | 14.68 | 1 Q | 14.62 | 5 |
| Liadagmis Povea | Women's triple jump | 14.39 | 4 Q | 14.64 | 4 |
| Melany del Pilar Matheus | Women's discus throw | 61.07 | 19 | Did not advance | |
| Silinda Moráles | Women's discus throw | 59.46 | 25 | Did not advance | |

== Boxing ==
Cuba entered five boxers into the Olympic tournament. Saidel Horta (men's featherweight), Arlen López (men's middleweight), Julio César La Cruz (men's heavyweight) secured their selection to the Cuban squad in their respective weight divisions finishing in the top two, at the 2023 Pan American Games in Santiago, Chile. Alejandro Claro (men's flyweight) qualified for the games by winning the quota bouts round, at the 2024 World Olympic Qualification Tournament 1 in Busto Arsizio, Italy, and Erislandy Álvarez (men's lightweight) qualified for the games by winning the quota bouts round at the 2024 World Olympic Qualification Tournament 2 in Bangkok, Thailand.

| Athlete | Event | Round of 32 | Round of 16 | Quarterfinals | Semifinals | Final | |
| Athlete | Event | Opposition Result | Opposition Result | Opposition Result | Opposition Result | Opposition Result | Rank |
|---|---|---|---|---|---|---|---|
| Alejandro Claro | Men's 51 kg | Bye | Trindade (BRA); W 5–0 | Bennama (FRA); L 2–3 | Did not advance | | 5 |
| Saidel Horta | Men's 57 kg | Bye | Seiitbek Uulu (KGZ); L 2–3 | Did not advance | | | 16 |
| Erislandy Álvarez | Men's 63.5 kg | Ume (PNG); W RSC | Bekka (ALG); W 5–0 | Sinsiri (THA); W 5–0 | Guruli (GEO); W 5–0 | Oumiha (FRA); W 3–2 | 1st place, gold medalist(s) |
| Arlen López | Men's 80 kg | Bye | Aykutsun (TUR); W 5–0 | Khabibullaev (UZB); W 3–2 | Khyzhniak (UKR); L 2–3 | Did not advance | 3rd place, bronze medalist(s) |
| Julio César La Cruz | Men's 92 kg | —N/a | Alfonso (AZE); L 2–3 | Did not advance | | | 16 |

== Canoeing ==
=== Sprint ===
Cuban canoeists qualified 3 boats in the following distances for the Games through the 2023 ICF Canoe Sprint World Championships in Duisburg, Germany; and 2024 Pan American Canoe Sprint Olympic Qualifiers in Sarasota, United States.

| Athlete | Event | Heats | | Quarterfinals | | Semifinals | | Final | |
| Athlete | Event | Time | Rank | Time | Rank | Time | Rank | Time | Rank |
|---|---|---|---|---|---|---|---|---|---|
| José Ramón Pelier | Men's C-1 1000 m | 3:52.17 | 3 | 3:49.41 | 2 | 3:46.37 | 6 FB | 3:48.58 | 10 |
| Yinnoly López | Women's C-1 200 m | 49.27 | 4 | 48.76 | 5 | Did not advance | | | |
| Yarisleidis Cirilo | Women's C-1 200 m | 45.94 | 1 | Bye | | 45.31 | 1 FA | 44.36 | 3rd place, bronze medalist(s) |
| Yarisleidis Cirilo; Yinnoly López | Women's C-2 500 m | 2:03.54 | 7 | 1:56.38 | 3 | 1:57.03 | 3 FA | 2:01.77 | 8 |

Qualification Legend: FA = Qualify to final (medal); FB = Qualify to final B (non-medal)

== Cycling ==
=== Road ===
Cuba entered one female rider to compete in the road race events at the Olympics through the establishment of UCI Nation Ranking.

| Athlete | Event | Time | Rank |
|---|---|---|---|
| Arlenis Sierra | Women's road race | 4:07:16 | 48 |

== Diving ==
Cuba entered two divers, Prisis Ruiz and Anisley García, into the Olympic competition.

| Athlete | Event | Preliminary | | Semifinal | | Final | |
| Athlete | Event | Points | Rank | Points | Rank | Points | Rank |
|---|---|---|---|---|---|---|---|
| Prisis Ruiz | Women's 3 m springboard | 239.85 | 25 | Did not advance | | | |
| Anisley García | Women's 3 m springboard | 272.40 | 18 Q | 264.90 | 15 | Did not advance | |
| Anisley García | Women's 10 m platform | 283.00 | 14 Q | 270.65 | 16 | Did not advance | |

== Judo ==
Cuba qualified four judokas for the following weight classes at the Games. Ivan Silva Morales (men's middleweight, 90 kg), Andy Granda (men's super-heavyweight, +100 kg), Maylin Del Toro Carvajal (women's half-middleweight, 63 kg) and Idalys Ortiz (women's super-heavyweight, +78 kg) qualified via quota based on IJF World Ranking List and continental quota based on Olympic point rankings.

| Athlete | Event | Round of 64 | Round of 32 | Round of 16 | Quarterfinals | Semifinals | Repechage | Final / BM | |
| Athlete | Event | Opposition Result | Opposition Result | Opposition Result | Opposition Result | Opposition Result | Opposition Result | Opposition Result | Rank |
|---|---|---|---|---|---|---|---|---|---|
| Ivan Silva Morales | Men's −90 kg | —N/a | Sherov (KGZ); L 00–10 | Did not advance | | | | | |
| Andy Granda | Men's +100 kg | —N/a | Bye | Gadeau (MON); W 10-00 | Saito (JPN); L 0–1 | —N/a | Kokauri (AZE); W 10–0 | Rakhimov (TJK); L 0–1 | 5 |
| Maylin Del Toro Carvajal | Women's −63 kg | —N/a | Takaichi (JPN); L 00–10 | Did not advance | | | | | |
| Idalys Ortiz | Women's +78 kg | —N/a | Maan (IND); W 10–0 | Zabic (SRB); L 0–10 | Did not advance | | | | |

== Modern pentathlon ==
A Cuban modern pentathlete was confirmed as a single quota place for Paris 2024. Marcos Rojas Jiménez secured one of two available South American berths in the women's event at the 2023 Pan American Games in Santiago, Chile.

| Athlete | Event | | Fencing (épée one touch) | | | | Swimming (200 m freestyle) | | | Riding (show jumping) | | | | Combined: shooting/running (10 m laser pistol)/(3000 m) | | | Total points | Final rank |
| Athlete | Event | | V – D | BR | Rank | MP points | Time | Rank | MP points | Time | Penalties | Rank | MP points | Time | Rank | MP points | Total points | Final rank |
|---|---|---|---|---|---|---|---|---|---|---|---|---|---|---|---|---|---|---|
| Marcos Rojas Jiménez | Men's | Semifinal | 10–25 | 0 | 30 | 175 | 2:01.96 | 7 | 307 | 67.56 | 21 | 17 | 279 | 10:41.65 | 16 | 659 | 1420 | 15 |
| Marcos Rojas Jiménez | Men's | Final | Did not advance | | | | | | | | | | | | | | | |

== Rowing ==
Cuban rowers qualified two boats in each in the men's and women's single sculls for the Games through the 2024 Americas Qualification Regatta in Rio de Janeiro, Brazil.

| Athlete | Event | Heats | | Repechage | | Quarterfinals | | Semifinals | | Final | |
| Athlete | Event | Time | Rank | Time | Rank | Time | Rank | Time | Rank | Time | Rank |
|---|---|---|---|---|---|---|---|---|---|---|---|
| Reidy Cardona Blanco | Men's single sculls | 7:06.45 | 3 QF | Bye | | 7:10.40 | 6 SC/D | 7:15.63 | 6 FD | 7:03.23 | 24 |
| Yariulvis Cobas | Women's single sculls | 8:11.13 | 5 R | 8:10.64 | 3 SE/F | N/A | | 8:36.16 | 1 FE | 7:57.99 | 27 |

Qualification Legend: FA=Final A (medal); FB=Final B (non-medal); FC=Final C (non-medal); FD=Final D (non-medal); FE=Final E (non-medal); FF=Final F (non-medal); SA/B=Semifinals A/B; SC/D=Semifinals C/D; SE/F=Semifinals E/F; QF=Quarterfinals; R=Repechage

== Shooting ==
Cuban shooters achieved quota places for the following events based on their results at the 2022 and 2024 Championships of the Americas.

| Athlete | Event | Qualification | | Final | |
| Athlete | Event | Points | Rank | Points | Rank |
|---|---|---|---|---|---|
| Leuris Pupo | Men's 25 m rapid fire pistol | 581 | 16 | Did not advance | |
| Jorge Álvarez | Men's 25 m rapid fire pistol | 578 | 21 | Did not advance | |
| Laina Pérez | Women's 25 m pistol | 577 | 24 | Did not advance | |
| Laina Pérez | Women's 10 m air pistol | 560 | 39 | Did not advance | |
| Lisbet Hernández | Women's 10 m rifle | 624.7 | 36 | Did not advance | |

== Swimming ==
Cuba sent two swimmers to compete at the 2024 Paris Olympics.

| Athlete | Event | Heat | | Semifinal | | Final | |
| Athlete | Event | Time | Rank | Time | Rank | Time | Rank |
|---|---|---|---|---|---|---|---|
| Rodolfo Falcón Jr | Men's 1500 m freestyle | 16:00.31 | 24 | —N/a | | Did not advance | |
| Andrea Becali | Women's 200 m freestyle | 2:03.38 | 21 | Did not advance | | | |

Qualifiers for the latter rounds (Q) of all events were decided on a time-only basis; therefore, positions shown are overall results versus competitors in all heats.

== Table tennis ==
Cuba qualified for the mixed doubles team and the men's single in the Games by winning the silver medal at the 2023 Pan American Games in Santiago, Chile, and by securing one of five available spots, through the 2024 Pan American Qualification Tournament in Lima, Peru.

Men

| Athlete | Event | Preliminary | Round 1 | Round 2 | Round 3 | Round of 16 | Quarterfinals | Semifinals | Final / BM | |
| Athlete | Event | Opposition Result | Opposition Result | Opposition Result | Opposition Result | Opposition Result | Opposition Result | Opposition Result | Opposition Result | Rank |
|---|---|---|---|---|---|---|---|---|---|---|
| Andy Pereira | Singles | Bye | Calderano (BRA); L 0–4 | Did not advance | | | | | | |

Mixed

| Athlete | Event | Round of 16 | Quarterfinal | Semifinal | Final / BM | |
| Athlete | Event | Opposition Result | Opposition Result | Opposition Result | Opposition Result | Rank |
|---|---|---|---|---|---|---|
| Daniela Fonseca; Jorge Campos | Doubles | Karlsson/Källberg (SWE); L 1–4 | Did not advance | | | |

== Taekwondo ==
Cuba qualified two athletes to compete at the 2024 Olympic Games. Rafael Alba (men's +80 kg) and Arlettys Acosta (women's +67 kg) secured their spots through the 2024 Pan American Qualification Tournament in Santo Domingo, Dominican Republic.

| Athlete | Event | Qualification | Round of 16 | Quarterfinals | Semifinals | Repechage | Final / BM | |
| Athlete | Event | Opposition Result | Opposition Result | Opposition Result | Opposition Result | Opposition Result | Opposition Result | Rank |
|---|---|---|---|---|---|---|---|---|
| Rafael Alba | Men's +80 kg | Bye | Atesli (TUR); W 2–0 | Cunningham (GBR); L 2–1 | —N/a | Issoufou (NIG); W 2–1 | Sapina (CRO); W 2–0 | 3rd place, bronze medalist(s) |
| Arlettys Acosta | Women's +67 kg | Bye | Brandl (GER); L 2–0 | Did not advance | | | | |

== Volleyball ==
=== Beach ===
Cuban men's pair qualified for Paris based on the FIVB Beach Volleyball Olympic Ranking.

| Athletes | Event | Preliminary round | | | | Round of 16 | Quarterfinal | Semifinal | Final / BM | |
| Athletes | Event | Opposition Score | Opposition Score | Opposition Score | Rank | Opposition Score | Opposition Score | Opposition Score | Opposition Score | Rank |
|---|---|---|---|---|---|---|---|---|---|---|
| Jorge Alayo; Noslen Díaz | Men's | Partain / Benesh (USA); W 2–0 | George / André (BRA); W 2–0 | Abicha / El Graoui (MAR); W 2–0 | 1 Q | Åhman / Hellvig (SWE); L 1–2 | Did not advance | | | 9 |

== Weightlifting ==
Cuba qualified one weightlifter into the Olympic competition. Ayamey Medina (women's 81 kg) secured one of the top ten slots, each in their respective weight divisions based on the IWF Olympic Qualification Rankings.

| Athlete | Event | Snatch | | Clean & Jerk | | Total | Rank |
| Athlete | Event | Result | Rank | Result | Rank | Total | Rank |
|---|---|---|---|---|---|---|---|
| Ayamey Medina | Women's −81 kg | 100 | 11 | ~~120~~ | DNF | — | DNF |

== Wrestling ==
Cuba qualified ten wrestlers for each of the following classes into the Olympic competition. Four of them qualified for the games by virtue of top five results through the 2023 World Championships in Belgrade, Serbia; and the other six wrestler qualified through the 2024 Pan American Olympic Qualification Tournament in Acapulco, Mexico.

Key:

- VT (ranking points: 5–0 or 0–5) – Victory by fall.
- VB (ranking points: 5–0 or 0–5) – Victory by injury (VF for forfeit, VA for withdrawal or disqualification)
- PP (ranking points: 3–1 or 1–3) – Decision by points – the loser with technical points.
- PO (ranking points: 3–0 or 0–3) – Decision by points – the loser without technical points.
- ST (ranking points: 4–0 or 0–4) – Great superiority – the loser without technical points and a margin of victory of at least 8 (Greco-Roman) or 10 (freestyle) points.
- SP (ranking points: 4–1 or 1–4) – Technical superiority – the loser with technical points and a margin of victory of at least 8 (Greco-Roman) or 10 (freestyle) points.

Freestyle

| Athlete | Event | Round of 32 | Round of 16 | Quarterfinal | Semifinal | Repechage | Final / BM | |
| Athlete | Event | Opposition Result | Opposition Result | Opposition Result | Opposition Result | Opposition Result | Opposition Result | Rank |
|---|---|---|---|---|---|---|---|---|
| Alejandro Valdés | Men's −65 kg | —N/a | Tumur Ochir (MGL); L 0–5 | Did not advance | | | | 11 |
| Geandry Garzón | Men's −74 kg | Bye | Takatani (JPN); L 0–10 | Bye | | Cabolov (SRB); L VFO | Did not advance | |
| Arturo Silot | Men's −97 kg | —N/a | Thiele (GER); W 5–0 | Snyder (USA); L 0–5 | Did not advance | | | 9 |
| Yusneylys Guzmán | Women's −50 kg | —N/a | Demirhan (TUR); W 7–6 ^{PP} | Dilytė (LTU); W 10–0 ^{ST} | Vinesh (IND); W ~~0–5~~ DQ | Bye | Hildebrandt (USA); L 0–3 ^{PO} | 2nd place, silver medalist(s) |
| Milaimys Marín | Women's −76 kg | —N/a | Yaneva (BUL); W 7–1 ^{PP} | Blades (USA); L 3–4 ^{PP} | Bye | Axente (ROU); W 5–0 ^{VB} | Medet Kyzy (KGZ); W 6–0 ^{PO} | 3rd place, bronze medalist(s) |

Greco-Roman

| Athlete | Event | Round of 32 | Round of 16 | Quarterfinals | Semifinals | Repechage | Final / BM | |
| Athlete | Event | Opposition Result | Opposition Result | Opposition Result | Opposition Result | Opposition Result | Opposition Result | Rank |
|---|---|---|---|---|---|---|---|---|
| Kevin de Armas | Men's −60 kg | Bye | Fumita (JPN); L 1–4 ^{SP} | Did not advance | | Mohsennejad (IRI); L 1–10 | Did not advance | 11 |
| Luis Orta | Men's −67 kg | —N/a | Sogabe (JPN); W ^{PO} 8–0 | Esmaeili (IRI); L 0–9 | Bye | Ghaiou (ALG); W 9–0 | Galstyan (ARM); W 7–0 | 3rd place, bronze medalist(s) |
| Yosvanys Peña | Men's −77 kg | —N/a | Kavianinejad (IRI); L 1–1 | Did not advance | | | | 9 |
| Gabriel Rosillo | Men's −97 kg | —N/a | Lazogianis (GER); W 7–5 | Savolainen (FIN); W 5–2 | Aleksanyan (ARM); L 3–5 | Bye | Assakalov (UZB); W 2–0^{R} | 3rd place, bronze medalist(s) |
| Mijaín López | Men's −130 kg | —N/a | Seung-chan (KOR); W 7–0 ^{PO} | Mirzazadeh (IRI); W 3–1 ^{PP} | Shariati (AZE); W 3–1 ^{PP} | Bye | Acosta (CHI); W 6–0 | 1st place, gold medalist(s) |
