= 2022 ICF Canoe Sprint World Championships – Women's C-1 200 metres =

Women's C-1 200 metres at the 2022 ICF Canoe Sprint World Championships
- Venue: Lake Banook
- Location: Dartmouth, Canada
- Dates: 4–7 August
- Competitors: 16 from 16 nations
- Winning time: 49.87

Medalists
| gold medal | Nevin Harrison | United States |
| silver medal | María Corbera | Spain |
| bronze medal | Lin Wenjun | China |

The women's C-1 200 metres competition at the 2022 ICF Canoe Sprint World Championships in Dartmouth took place on Lake Banook.

== Schedule ==
The schedule is as follows:

| Date | Time | Round |
|---|---|---|
| Thursday 4 August 2022 | 09:15 | Heats |
| Friday 5 August 2022 | 14:40 | Semifinal |
| Sunday 7 August 2022 | 11:11 | Final |

== Results ==
=== Heats ===
The fastest three boats in each heat advanced directly to the final.
The next four fastest boats in each heat, plus the fastest remaining boat advanced to the semifinal.

==== Heat 1 ====
| Rank | Canoeist | Country | Time | Notes |
|---|---|---|---|---|
| 1 | Katie Vincent | Canada | 46.50 | QF |
| 2 | María Corbera | Spain | 46.68 | QF |
| 3 | Katarzyna Szperkiewicz | Poland | 47.10 | QF |
| 4 | Mariami Kerdikashvili | Georgia | 48.63 | QS |
| 5 | Vanesa Tot | Croatia | 48.89 | QS |
| 6 | Goodness Foloki | Nigeria | 57.86 | QS |
| 7 | Combe Seck | Senegal | 58.48 | QS |
| | Manuela Gómez | Colombia | DNS | |

==== Heat 2 ====
| Rank | Canoeist | Country | Time | Notes |
|---|---|---|---|---|
| 1 | Yarisleidis Duboys | Cuba | 46.52 | QF |
| 2 | Lin Wenjun | China | 46.59 | QF |
| 3 | Nevin Harrison | United States | 46.87 | QF |
| 4 | María Mailliard | Chile | 46.97 | QS |
| 5 | Liudmyla Luzan | Ukraine | 48.15 | QS |
| 6 | Eugénie Dorange | France | 50.00 | QS |
| 7 | Kincső Takács | Hungary | 50.15 | QS |
| 8 | Stephanie Guzmán | Mexico | 51.03 | qS |

=== Semifinal ===
The fastest three boats advanced to the final.

| Rank | Canoeist | Country | Time | Notes |
|---|---|---|---|---|
| 1 | María Mailliard | Chile | 49.72 | QF |
| 2 | Liudmyla Luzan | Ukraine | 50.42 | QF |
| 3 | Vanesa Tot | Croatia | 51.53 | QF |
| 4 | Mariami Kerdikashvili | Georgia | 51.90 | |
| 5 | Eugénie Dorange | France | 53.00 | |
| 6 | Stephanie Guzmán | Mexico | 53.41 | |
| 7 | Kincső Takács | Hungary | 54.09 | |
| 8 | Combe Seck | Senegal | 1:03.72 | |
| | Goodness Foloki | Nigeria | DSQ | |

=== Final ===
Competitors raced for positions 1 to 9, with medals going to the top three.

| Rank | Canoeist | Country | Time |
|---|---|---|---|
| 1st place, gold medalist(s) | Nevin Harrison | United States | 49.87 |
| 2nd place, silver medalist(s) | María Corbera | Spain | 50.54 |
| 3rd place, bronze medalist(s) | Lin Wenjun | China | 50.55 |
| 4 | María Mailliard | Chile | 50.63 |
| 5 | Katie Vincent | Canada | 50.63 |
| 6 | Yarisleidis Duboys | Cuba | 50.92 |
| 7 | Katarzyna Szperkiewicz | Poland | 52.20 |
| 8 | Vanesa Tot | Croatia | 53.24 |
| 9 | Liudmyla Luzan | Ukraine | 54.29 |
