= Canoeing at the 2022 Asian Games – Women's C-1 200 metres =

Women's C-1 200 metres at the 2022 Asian Games
- Venue: Fuyang Water Sports Centre
- Date: 1–3 October 2023
- Competitors: 10 from 10 nations

Medalists
gold medal	Lin Wenjun	China
silver medal	Orasa Thiangkathok	Thailand
bronze medal	Mariya Brovkova	Kazakhstan

The women's sprint C-1 (canoe single) 200 metres competition at the 2022 Asian Games was held on 1 and 3 October 2023.

== Schedule ==
All times are China Standard Time (UTC+08:00)

Date	Time	Event
Sunday, 1 October 2023	09:30	Heats
Sunday, 1 October 2023	15:00	Semifinal
Tuesday, 3 October 2023	10:00	Final

== Results ==
=== Heats ===
- Qualification: 1–3 → Final (QF), Rest → Semifinal (QS)

==== Heat 1 ====
Rank	Athlete	Time	Notes
1	Mariya Brovkova (KAZ)	52.530	QF
2	Orasa Thiangkathok (THA)	53.027	QF
3	Riska Andriyani (INA)	53.968	QF
4	Lee Ye-lin (KOR)	54.310	QS
5	Megha Pradeep (IND)	56.705	QS

==== Heat 2 ====
Rank	Athlete	Time	Notes
1	Lin Wenjun (CHN)	50.999	QF
2	Nguyễn Thị Hương (VIE)	53.437	QF
3	Shokhsanam Sherzodova (UZB)	53.596	QF
4	Mio Kobayashi (JPN)	54.799	QS
5	Hiva Afzali (IRI)	55.278	QS

=== Semifinal ===
- Qualification: 1–3 → Final (QF)

Rank	Athlete	Time	Notes
1	Mio Kobayashi (JPN)	51.883	QF
2	Hiva Afzali (IRI)	52.623	QF
3	Lee Ye-lin (KOR)	53.693	QF
4	Megha Pradeep (IND)	55.406	

=== Final ===
Rank	Athlete	Time
1st place, gold medalist(s)	Lin Wenjun (CHN)	47.623
2nd place, silver medalist(s)	Orasa Thiangkathok (THA)	49.221
3rd place, bronze medalist(s)	Mariya Brovkova (KAZ)	49.368
4	Shokhsanam Sherzodova (UZB)	49.539
5	Nguyễn Thị Hương (VIE)	49.621
6	Hiva Afzali (IRI)	49.898
7	Lee Ye-lin (KOR)	49.989
8	Mio Kobayashi (JPN)	50.766
9	Riska Andriyani (INA)	51.085
