= Canoeing at the 2023 Pan American Games – Women's C-1 200 metres =

Women's C-1 200 metres at the 2023 Pan American Games
- Venue: Laguna Grande
- Dates: November 1 and November 3
- Competitors: 10 from 10 nations
- Winning time: 45.87

Medalists
Gold medal	Yarisleidis Cirilo	Cuba
Silver medal	María Mailliard	Chile
Bronze medal	Sophia Jensen	Canada

The women's C-1 200 metres competition of the canoeing events at the 2023 Pan American Games was held on November 1 and 3 at the Laguna Grande in San Pedro de la Paz, Chile.

== Schedule ==
Date	Time	Round
November 1, 2023	09:45	Heats
November 1, 2023	11:35	Semi-final
November 3, 2023	09:45	Final

== Results ==
=== Heats ===
The best two score of each heat advance directly to the final, while the rest advance to the semifinal.

==== Heat 1 ====
Rank	Name	Nation	Time	Notes
1	Sophia Jensen	Canada	47.13	FA
2	Andreea Ghizila	United States	47.63	FA
3	Valdenice Conceição	Brazil	49.10	SF
4	Martina Vela	Argentina	54.77	SF
5	Javianyelis Rivas	Venezuela	57.73	SF

==== Heat 2 ====
Rank	Name	Nation	Time	Notes
1	Yarisleidis Cirilo	Cuba	46.96	FA
2	María Mailliard	Chile	48.42	FA
3	Anggie Avegno	Ecuador	51.11	SF
4	Nicol Guzmán	Mexico	51.17	SF
5	Manuela Gómez	Colombia	51.69	SF

=== Semifinals ===
The best four scores advance to the Final A, while the rest advance to the Final B.

Rank	Name	Nation	Time	Notes
1	Anggie Avegno	Ecuador	51.34	FA
2	Valdenice Conceição	Brazil	51.94	FA
3	Manuela Gómez	Colombia	52.92	FA
4	Nicol Guzmán	Mexico	53.63	FA
5	Martina Vela	Argentina	54.86	FB
6	Javianyelis Rivas	Venezuela	1:00.79	FB

=== Finals ===
The results for the finals were as follows:

==== Final B ====
Rank	Name	Nation	Time	Notes
9	Martina Vela	Argentina	50.35	
10	Javianyelis Rivas	Venezuela	55.76	

==== Final A ====
Rank	Name	Nation	Time	Notes
1st place, gold medalist(s)	Yarisleidis Cirilo	Cuba	45.87	
2nd place, silver medalist(s)	María Mailliard	Chile	46.18	
3rd place, bronze medalist(s)	Sophia Jensen	Canada	46.87	
4	Andreea Ghizila	United States	46.94	
5	Valdenice Conceição	Brazil	49.10	
6	Anggie Avegno	Ecuador	49.21	
7	Manuela Gómez	Colombia	49.28	
8	Nicol Guzmán	Mexico	49.31	
