= 2023 ICF Canoe Sprint World Championships – Women's C-2 200 metres =

Canoe competition in Duisburg, Germany

Women's C-2 200 metres at the 2023 ICF Canoe Sprint World Championships
- Venue: Sportpark Duisburg
- Location: Duisburg, Germany
- Dates: 23 and 25 August 2023
- Competitors: 32 from 16 nations
- Winning time: 42.516

Medalists
gold medal	Shuai Changwen; Lin Wenjun	China
silver medal	Antía Jácome; María Corbera	Spain
bronze medal	Lisa Jahn; Hedi Kliemke	Germany

The women's C-2 200 metres competition at the 2023 ICF Canoe Sprint World Championships in Duisburg took place in Sportpark Duisburg.

== Schedule ==
The schedule is as follows:

Date	Time	Round
Wednesday 23 August 2023	11:40	Heats
Friday 25 August 2023	13:17	Semifinal
Friday 25 August 2023	18:00	Final

== Results ==
=== Heats ===
The fastest three boats in each heat advanced directly to the final.
The next four fastest boats in each heat, plus the fastest remaining boat advanced to the semifinal.

==== Heat 1 ====
Rank	Canoeist	Country	Time	Notes
1	Shuai Changwen; Lin Wenjun	China	42.230	QF
2	Lisa Jahn; Hedi Kliemke	Germany	43.305	QF
3	Dóra Horányi; Kincső Takács	Hungary	44.718	QF
4	Margarita Torlopova; Ulyana Kisseleva	Kazakhstan	38.881	QS
5	Maede Shoorgashti; Hiva Afzali	Iran	45.775	QS
6	Manuela Gómez; Ana Sofia Rodríguez	Colombia	45.806	QS
7	Maoli Angulo; Anggie Avegno	Ecuador	45.914	QS
8	Kseniia Romanchuk; Yuliana Putnina	Ukraine	46.671	QS

==== Heat 2 ====
Rank	Canoeist	Country	Time	Notes
1	Antía Jácome; María Corbera	Spain	42.960	QF
2	Daniela Cociu; Maria Olărașu	Moldova	43.833	QF
3	Gulbakhor Fayzieva; Nilufar Zokirova	Uzbekistan	44.589	QF
4	Jacy Grant; Julia Lilley Osende	Canada	44.707	QS
5	Azusa Murphy; Andreea Ghizila	United States	45.164	QS
6	Amelia Braun; Magda Stanny	Poland	45.956	QS
7	Riska Andriyani; Nurmeni Nurmeni	Indonesia	46.010	QS
8	Kaveri Dimar; Neha Devi Leichonbam	India	48.369	

=== Semifinal ===
The fastest three boats advanced to the final.

Rank	Canoeist	Country	Time	Notes
1	Azusa Murphy; Andreea Ghizila	United States	44.592	QF
2	Amelia Braun; Magda Stanny	Poland	44.799	QF
3	Jacy Grant; Julia Lilley Osende	Canada	39.409	QF
4	Margarita Torlopova; Ulyana Kisseleva	Kazakhstan	44.897	
5	Maede Shoorgashti; Hiva Afzali	Iran	45.037	
6	Riska Andriyani; Nurmeni Nurmeni	Indonesia	45.459	
7	Manuela Gómez; Ana Sofia Rodríguez	Colombia	45.525	
8	Maoli Angulo; Anggie Avegno	Ecuador	45.648	
9	Kseniia Romanchuk; Yuliana Putnina	Ukraine	50.473	

=== Final ===
Competitors raced for positions 1 to 9, with medals going to the top three.

Rank	Canoeist	Country	Time
1st place, gold medalist(s)	Shuai Changwen; Lin Wenjun	China	42.516
2nd place, silver medalist(s)	Antía Jácome; María Corbera	Spain	42.760
3rd place, bronze medalist(s)	Lisa Jahn; Hedi Kliemke	Germany	43.623
4	Daniela Cociu; Maria Olărașu	Moldova	43.953
5	Amelia Braun; Magda Stanny	Poland	44.562
6	Dóra Horányi; Kincső Takács	Hungary	44.761
7	Jacy Grant; Julia Lilley Osende	Canada	45.188
8	Gulbakhor Fayzieva; Nilufar Zokirova	Uzbekistan	45.293
9	Azusa Murphy; Andreea Ghizila	United States	45.491
