= Chile at the 2024 Summer Olympics =

- IOC code: CHI
- NOC: Chilean Olympic Committee
- Website: www.coch.cl (in Spanish)

in Paris, France 26 July 2024 – 11 August 2024
- Competitors: 48 (30 men and 18 women) in 19 sports
- Flag bearers (opening): Nicolás Jarry & Antonia Abraham
- Flag bearers (closing): Fernanda Aguirre & Clemente Seguel
- Medals Ranked 55th: Gold 1 Silver 1 Bronze 0 Total 2

Summer Olympics appearances (overview)
- ~~1896~~; 1900–1908; 1912; 1920; 1924; 1928; 1932; 1936; 1948; 1952; 1956; 1960; 1964; 1968; 1972; 1976; 1980; 1984; 1988; 1992; 1996; 2000; 2004; 2008; 2012; 2016; 2020; 2024; 2028

Chile competed at the 2024 Summer Olympics in Paris from 26 July to 11 August 2024. Since the nation's debut in 1896, Chilean athletes have appeared in all but five editions of the Summer Olympics of the modern era. Chile did not attend the 1932 Summer Olympics in Los Angeles at the period of the worldwide Great Depression and was also part of the US-led boycott, when Moscow hosted the 1980 Summer Olympics.

Chile's opening ceremony flagbearers were Nicolás Jarry and Antonia Abraham. The nation won a gold medal for the first time since 2004 and any medals for the first time since 2008.

== Medalists ==
Medal	Name	Sport	Event	Date
Gold	Francisca Crovetto	Shooting	Women's skeet	4 August
Silver	Yasmani Acosta	Wrestling	Men's Greco-Roman 130 kg	6 August

== Competitors ==
The following is the list of number of competitors participating in the Games:

Sport	Men	Women	Total
Archery	1	0	1
Athletics	6	3	9
Canoeing	0	3	3
Cycling	2	2	4
Equestrian	1	0	1
Fencing	0	1	1
Golf	2	0	2
Judo	1	1	2
Modern pentathlon	1	0	1
Rowing	2	2	4
Sailing	1	1	2
Shooting	1	1	2
Swimming	1	1	2
Table tennis	1	2	3
Taekwondo	1	1	2
Tennis	3	0	3
Triathlon	2	0	2
Volleyball	2	0	2
Wrestling	2	0	2
Total	30	18	48

== Archery ==
One Chilean archer qualified for the men's individual recurve by virtue of his result at the 2023 Pan American Games in Santiago, Chile.

Athlete	Event	Ranking round		Round of 64	Round of 32	Round of 16	Quarterfinals	Semifinals	Final / BM	
Athlete	Event	Score	Seed	Opposition Score	Opposition Score	Opposition Score	Opposition Score	Opposition Score	Opposition Score	Rank
Andrés Gallardo	Men's individual	641	57	Gazoz (TUR); L 0–6	Did not advance					

== Athletics ==
Chilean track and field athletes achieved the entry standards for Paris 2024, either by passing the direct qualifying mark (or time for track and road races) or by world ranking, in the following events (a maximum of 3 athletes each).

Key

- Note–Ranks given for track events are within the athlete's heat only
- Q = Qualified for the next round
- q = Qualified for the next round as a fastest loser or, in field events, by position without achieving the qualifying target
- NR = National record
- N/A = Round not applicable for the event
- Bye = Athlete not required to compete in round

Track and road events

Athlete	Event	Heat		Repechage		Semifinal		Final	
Athlete	Event	Result	Rank	Result	Rank	Result	Rank	Result	Rank
Martín Sáenz	Men's 110 m hurdles	13.83	8 R	13.95	6	Did not advance			
Hugo Catrileo	Men's marathon	—N/a						2:15:44	59
Carlos Díaz	Men's marathon	—N/a						2:14:25	53
Martina Weil	Women's 400 m	51.15	4 R	51.79	6	Did not advance			

Field events

Athlete	Event	Qualification		Final	
Athlete	Event	Result	Rank	Result	Rank
Claudio Romero	Men's discus throw	NM		Did not advance	
Gabriel Kehr	Men's hammer throw	72.31	20	Did not advance	
Humberto Mansilla	Men's hammer throw	71.83	24	Did not advance	
Natalia Duco	Women's shot put	16.11	30	Did not advance	
Ivana Gallardo	Women's shot put	17.47	18	Did not advance	

== Canoeing ==
=== Sprint ===
Chilean canoeists qualified three boats in the following distances for the Games through the 2023 ICF Canoe Sprint World Championships in Duisburg, Germany; and 2024 Pan American Canoe Sprint Olympic Qualifiers in Sarasota, United States.

Athlete	Event	Heats		Quarterfinals		Semifinals		Final	
Athlete	Event	Time	Rank	Time	Rank	Time	Rank	Time	Rank
María Mailliard	Women's C-1 200 m	46.50	2 Q	—N/a		46.76	6 FB	46.77	12
Karen Roco	Women's C-1 200 m	47.55	5 q	47.73	2 Q	47.63	7 FB	48.25	15
María Mailliard; Paula Gómez	Women's C-2 500 m	2:00.28	4 q	2:00.82	2 Q	1:58.10	5 FB	2:05.02	12

Qualification Legend: FA = Qualify to final (medal); FB = Qualify to final B (non-medal)

== Cycling ==
=== Road ===
Chile entered one female rider to compete in the road race events at the Olympic, through the establishment UCI Nation Ranking.

Athlete	Event	Time	Rank
Catalina Soto	Women's road race	4:09:49	60

=== Mountain biking ===
Chilean mountain bikers secured one men quota place for the Olympic through the release of the final Olympic mountain biking rankings.

Athlete	Event	Time	Rank
Martín Vidaurre	Men's cross-country	1:29:00	11

=== BMX ===
==== Freestyle ====
Chilean riders received a single quota spot in the women's BMX freestyle for Paris 2024, finishing among the top three eligible nations, not yet qualified, at the 2023 UCI BMX Freestyle World Championships in Glasgow, Great Britain.

Athlete	Event	Qualification		Final	
Athlete	Event	Points	Rank	Points	Rank
Macarena Perez Grasset	Women's	84.24	7	84.55	5

==== Race ====
Chilean riders secured a single quota place in the men's BMX race for Paris 2024 by topping the field of nations vying for qualification at the 2024 UCI BMX World Championships.

Athlete	Event	Quarterfinal		Repechage		Semifinal		Final	
Athlete	Event	Points	Rank	Points	Rank	Result	Rank	Result	Rank
Mauricio Molina	Men's	17	18 q	33.881	3 Q	DNS	8	Did not advance	

== Equestrian ==
Chile send one rider injumping individual competition to the Games, as one of two highest-ranked eligible nation within the individual FEI qualification for Group D and E; by virtue of top three nations performances in individual jumping events, not yet qualified, through the 2023 Pan American Games in Santiago.

=== Jumping ===
Athlete	Horse	Event	Qualification		Final		
Athlete	Horse	Event	Penalties	Rank	Penalties	Time	Rank
Agustín Covarrubias	Nelson du Petit Vivier	Individual	31	65	Did not advance		

== Fencing ==
Chile entered one fencer into the Olympic competition. Arantxa Inostroza secured her quota places after nominated as the highest ranked individual fencers in the women's foil events, eligible for American zone through the release of the FIE Official ranking for Paris 2024.

Athlete	Event	Round of 64	Round of 32	Round of 16	Quarterfinal	Semifinal	Final / BM	
Athlete	Event	Opposition Score	Opposition Score	Opposition Score	Opposition Score	Opposition Score	Opposition Score	Rank
Arantxa Inostroza	Women's foil	Bye	Guo (CAN); L 7–15	Did not advance				

== Golf ==
Chile entered two golfers into the Olympic tournament. Joaquín Niemann and Mito Pereira qualified for the games in the men's individual competitions, based on their ranking position, through the final release of top 60 ranked players, on the IGF World Rankings.

Men

Athlete	Event	Round 1	Round 2	Round 3	Round 4	Total		
Athlete	Event	Score	Score	Score	Score	Score	Par	Rank
Joaquín Niemann	Individual	66	70	68	68	272	−12	T9
Mito Pereira	Individual	69	76	74	66	285	+1	T45

== Judo ==
Chile qualified two judokas for the following weight classes at the Games. Thomas Briceño (men's heavyweight, 100 kg) and Mary Dee Vargas (women's extra-lightweight, 48 kg) got qualified via quota based on IJF World Ranking List and continental quota based on Olympic point rankings.

Athlete	Event	Round of 64	Round of 32	Round of 16	Quarterfinals	Semifinals	Repechage	Final / BM	
Athlete	Event	Opposition Result	Opposition Result	Opposition Result	Opposition Result	Opposition Result	Opposition Result	Opposition Result	Rank
Thomas Briceño	Men's −100 kg	—N/a	Kuczera (POL); L 00–10	Did not advance					
Mary Dee Vargas	Women's −48 kg	—N/a	Martínez (ESP); L 00–01	Did not advance					

== Modern pentathlon ==
Chilean modern pentathletes confirmed a single quota place for the Olympic games. Esteban Bustos secured his spots in the men's event through the re-allocations of unused universality quota places.

Athlete	Event	Fencing ranking round (Épée one touch)			Semifinal													Final												
Athlete	Event	Fencing ranking round (Épée one touch)			Fencing	Swimming (200 m freestyle)			Riding (Show jumping)				Shooting / Running (10 m laser pistol / 3000 m cross-country)			Total		Fencing	Swimming (200 m freestyle)			Riding (Show jumping)				Shooting / Running (10 m laser pistol / 3000 m cross-country)			Total	
Athlete	Event	V – D	Rank	MP points	BP	Time	Rank	MP points	Time	Rank	Penalties	MP points	Time	Rank	MP points	Rank	MP points	BP	Time	Rank	MP points	Time	Rank	Penalties	MP points	Time	Rank	MP points	Rank	MP points
Esteban Bustos	Men's	13—22	31	190	2	2:09.70	17	291	72.56	16	19	281	10:46.96	17	654	16	1418	Did not advance											32	1418

== Rowing ==
Chilean rowers qualified boats in each of the following classes through the 2023 World Rowing Championships in Belgrade, Serbia; and through the 2024 Americas Qualification Regatta in Rio de Janeiro, Brazil.

Athlete	Event	Heats		Repechage		Semifinals		Final	
Athlete	Event	Time	Rank	Time	Rank	Time	Rank	Time	Rank
César Abaroa; Eber Sanhueza	Men's lightweight double sculls	6:46.90	4 R	6:58.78	4 FC	—N/a		6:28.00	13
Antonia Abraham; Melita Abraham	Women's coxless pair	7:23.01	3 Q	—N/a		7:26.82	4 FB	7:10.45	9

Qualification Legend: FA=Final A (medal); FB=Final B (non-medal); FC=Final C (non-medal); FD=Final D (non-medal); FE=Final E (non-medal); FF=Final F (non-medal); SA/B=Semifinals A/B; SC/D=Semifinals C/D; SE/F=Semifinals E/F; QF=Quarterfinals; R=Repechage

== Sailing ==
Chilean sailors qualified one boat in each of the following classes through the 2023 Pan American Games in Santiago, Chile; and 2024 ILCA 7 World Championships in Adelaide, Australia.

Medal race events

Athlete	Event	Race											Net points	Final rank
Athlete	Event	1	2	3	4	5	6	7	8	9	10	M*	Net points	Final rank
Clemente Seguel	Men's ILCA 7	2	~~28~~	18	10	8	17	18	9	Cancelled		12	94	8
María José Poncell	Women's ILCA 6	37	~~42~~	37	36	39	37	27	37	28	Cancelled	EL	278	38

M = Medal race; EL = Eliminated – did not advance into the medal race

== Shooting ==
Chilean shooters achieved quota places for the following events based on their results at the 2022 and 2023 ISSF World Championships, 2022, 2023, and 2024 European Championships, 2023 European Games, and 2024 ISSF World Olympic Qualification Tournament.

Athlete	Event	Qualification		Final	
Athlete	Event	Points	Rank	Points	Rank
Diego Santiago Parra	Men's 10 m air pistol	568	27	Did not advance	
Francisca Crovetto	Women's skeet	120	5 Q	55 +7	1st place, gold medalist(s)

== Swimming ==
Chilean swimmers achieved entry standards in the following events for Paris 2024 (a maximum of two swimmers under the Olympic Qualifying Time (OST) and potentially at the Olympic Consideration Time (OCT)):

Athlete	Event	Heat		Final	
Athlete	Event	Time	Rank	Time	Rank
Eduardo Cisternas	Men's 400 m freestyle	3:51.29	25	Did not advance	
Kristel Köbrich	Women's 800 m freestyle	8:46.46	15	Did not advance	
Kristel Köbrich	Women's 1500 m freestyle	16:27.18	14	Did not advance	

== Table tennis ==
Chile qualified three table tennis players to participate at the Games. María Paulina Vega and Zhiying Zeng qualified for the games by securing one of five available spots, through the 2024 Pan American Qualification Tournament in Lima, Peru; meanwhile Nicolás Burgos qualified for the games as the Pan American highest ranked eligible players.

Athlete	Event	Preliminary	Round 1	Round 2	Round 3	Round of 16	Quarterfinals	Semifinals	Final / BM	
Athlete	Event	Opposition Result	Opposition Result	Opposition Result	Opposition Result	Opposition Result	Opposition Result	Opposition Result	Opposition Result	Rank
Nicolás Burgos	Men's singles	Bye	Kirill Gerassimenko (KAZ); L 0–4	Did not advance						
María Paulina Vega	Women's singles	Bye	Zhang (CAN); L 0–4	Did not advance						
Zhiying Zeng	Women's singles	Sahakian (LBN); L 1–4	Did not advance							

== Taekwondo ==
Chile qualified two athletes to compete at the 2024 Olympics. Joaquín Churchill and Fernanda Aguirre secured their spots in their respective weight class, after winning the semifinal match, through the 2024 Pan American Qualification Tournament, in Santo Domingo, Dominican Republic.

Athlete	Event	Qualification	Round of 16	Quarterfinals	Semifinals	Repechage	Final / BM	
Athlete	Event	Opposition Result	Opposition Result	Opposition Result	Opposition Result	Opposition Result	Opposition Result	Rank
Joaquín Churchill	Men's −80 kg	Bye	Seo G-w (KOR); L 8—6, 16—16, 1—14	Did not advance				
Fernanda Aguirre	Women's +67 kg	—N/a	Kuş (TUR); L 4—4, 0—2, 0—3	Did not advance				

== Tennis ==
Chile entered three tennis players into the Olympic tournament. Tomás Barrios Vera secured an outright berth in the men's singles by advancing to the final match at the 2023 Pan American Games in Santiago, Chile. Later on, Nicolás Jarry and Alejandro Tabilo ensuring their participation in the men's singles competition, after being listed as the top 64 eligible players based on the final ATP ranking for the Olympics.

Men

Athlete	Event	Round of 64	Round of 32	Round of 16	Quarterfinal	Semifinal	Final / BM	
Athlete	Event	Opposition Result	Opposition Result	Opposition Result	Opposition Result	Opposition Result	Opposition Result	Rank
Tomás Barrios Vera	Singles	Cerúndolo (ARG); L 2–6, 1–6	Did not advance					
Nicolás Jarry	Singles	Popyrin (AUS); L 3–6, 6–7^{(5–7)}	Did not advance					
Alejandro Tabilo	Singles	Safiullin (AIN); L 4–6, 4–6	Did not advance					
Nicolás Jarry; Alejandro Tabilo	Doubles	–	Darderi / Musetti (ITA); W 6–3, 6–7^{(5–7)}, [10–5]	Macháč / Pavlásek (CZE); L 7–5, 6–7^{(6–8)}, [4–10]	Did not advance			

== Triathlon ==
Chile achieved two quota places (two men) for the men's individual triathlon competition at the 2024 Summer Olympics through the Individual Olympic Qualification Ranking.

Individual

Athlete	Event	Time						Rank
Athlete	Event	Swim (1.5 km)	Trans 1	Bike (40 km)	Trans 2	Run (10 km)	Total	Rank
Diego Moya	Men's	21:05	0:51	51:31	0:26	33:54	1:47:47	28
Gaspar Riveros	Men's	22:14	0:50	53:47	0:28	32:29	1:49:48	38

== Volleyball ==
=== Beach ===
Chile men's pair qualified for Paris after winning the 2024 CSV Continental Cup Final in Iquique, Chile.

Athletes	Event	Preliminary round				LL	Round of 16	Quarterfinal	Semifinal	Final / BM	
Athletes	Event	Opposition Score	Opposition Score	Opposition Score	Rank	Opposition Score	Opposition Score	Opposition Score	Opposition Score	Opposition Score	Rank
Marco Grimalt; Esteban Grimalt	Men's	Mol / Sørum (NOR); L (14–21, 16–21)	Van de Velde / Immers (NED); L (19–21, 16–21)	Ranghieri / Carambula (ITA); W (21–15, 23–21)	3 LL	Schachter / Dearing (CAN); W INJ (21–1, 21–0)	Cherif / Ahmed (QAT); L (14–21, 13–21)	Did not advance			9

== Wrestling ==
Chile qualified two wrestlers for Paris 2024. Néstor Almanza and Yasmani Acosta qualified for the games following the triumph of advancing to the final round at 2024 Pan American Olympic Qualification Tournament in Acapulco, Mexico.

Key:

- VT (ranking points: 5–0 or 0–5) – Victory by fall.
- VB (ranking points: 5–0 or 0–5) – Victory by injury (VF for forfeit, VA for withdrawal or disqualification)
- PP (ranking points: 3–1 or 1–3) – Decision by points – the loser with technical points.
- PO (ranking points: 3–0 or 0–3) – Decision by points – the loser without technical points.
- ST (ranking points: 4–0 or 0–4) – Great superiority – the loser without technical points and a margin of victory of at least 8 (Greco-Roman) or 10 (freestyle) points.
- SP (ranking points: 4–1 or 1–4) – Technical superiority – the loser with technical points and a margin of victory of at least 8 (Greco-Roman) or 10 (freestyle) points.

Greco-Roman

Athlete	Event	Round of 16	Quarterfinals	Semifinals	Repechage	Final / BM	
Athlete	Event	Opposition Result	Opposition Result	Opposition Result	Opposition Result	Opposition Result	Rank
Néstor Almanza	Men's −67 kg	Petic (MDA); L 0–4 ^{VPO}	Did not advance				13
Yasmani Acosta	Men's −130 kg	Milov (BUL); W 1–1 ^{VPO1}	Mohamed (EGY); W 2—1 ^{VPO1}	Lingzhe (CHN); W 1–1 ^{VPO1}	—N/a	López (CUB); L 0–6 ^{VPO}	2nd place, silver medalist(s)

== See also ==
- Chile at the 2023 Pan American Games
- Chile at the 2024 Winter Youth Olympics
