= Antía Jácome =

Spanish canoeist (born 1999)

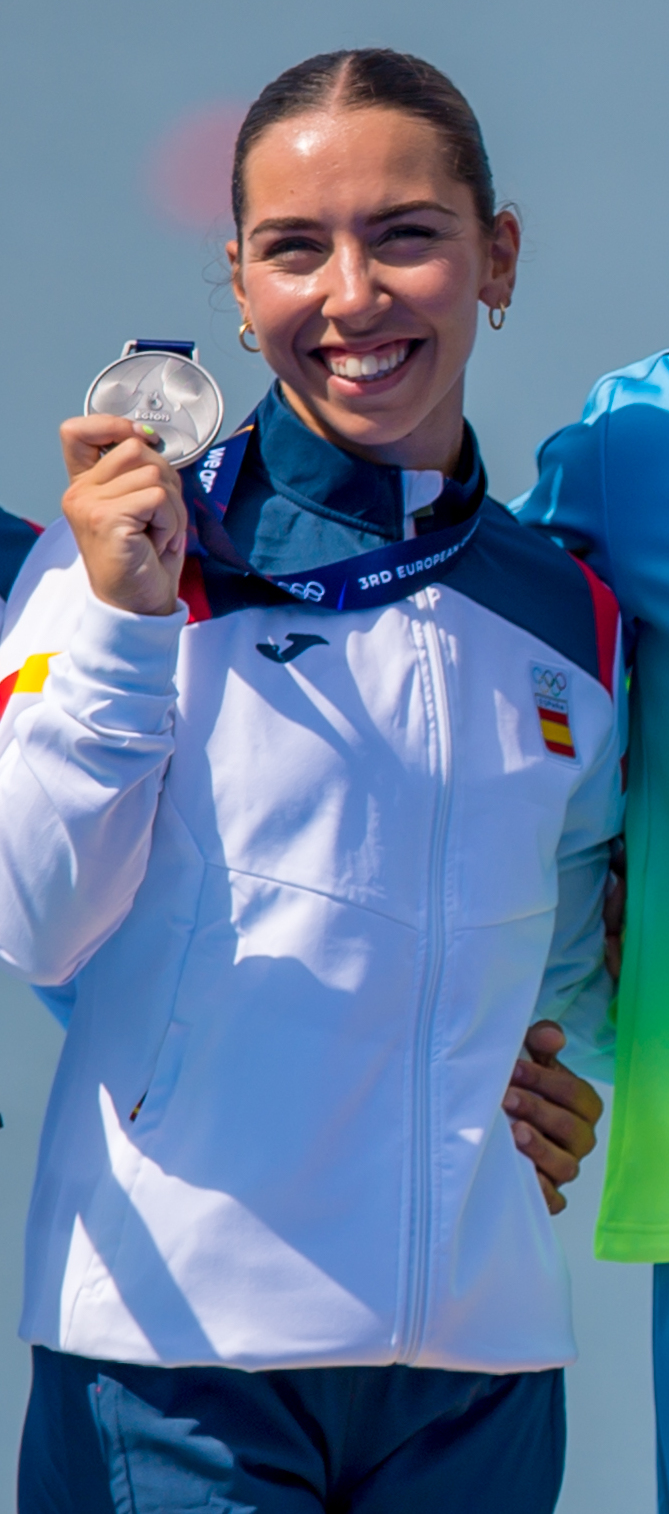
- Jácome at the 2023 European Games

Personal information
- Full name: Antía Jácome Couto
- Born: 22 November 1999 (age 26) Pontevedra, Spain
- Height: 1.62 m (5 ft 4 in)
- Weight: 59 kg (130 lb)

Sport
- Country: Spain
- Sport: Canoe sprint
Medal record
Women's canoe sprint
Representing Spain
World Championships
Silver medal – second place	2021 Copenhagen	C-1 200 m
Silver medal – second place	2023 Duisburg	C-1 200 m
Silver medal – second place	2023 Duisburg	C-2 200 m
Silver medal – second place	2023 Duisburg	C-2 500 m
European Championships
Gold medal – first place	2022 Munich	C-1 200 m
Gold medal – first place	2024 Szeged	C-2 200 m
Gold medal – first place	2026 Montemor-o-Velho	C-4 Mix 500 m
Silver medal – second place	2022 Munich	C-2 200 m
Silver medal – second place	2024 Szeged	C-1 200 m
European Games
Gold medal – first place	2023 Kraków-Małopolska	C-2 Mix 200 m
Silver medal – second place	2023 Kraków-Małopolska	C-2 500 m

Antía Jácome Couto (Note: In this Spanish name, the first or paternal surname is Jácome and the second or maternal family name is Couto.) (born 22 November 1999) is a Spanish sprint canoeist. She represented Spain at the 2020 Summer Olympics in the women's C-1 200 metres event. Jácome also competed for Spain at the 2024 Summer Olympics in the women's C-1 200 metres and C-2 500 metres events.
