= Alisa Glinka =

Moldovan equestrian

Personal information
- Nationality: Moldovan
- Born: 10 October 1987 (age 38) Chișinău, Moldavian SSR, Soviet Union

Sport
- Country: Moldova
- Sport: Equestrian

Achievements and titles
- Olympic finals: 2024 Olympic Games

Alisa Glinka (born 10 October 1987) is a Moldovan equestrian athlete and actress. She competed at the FEI World Cup Finals in Leipzig in 2022 as first Moldovan rider in history. Glinka also represented Moldova at the 2021 European Dressage Championships in Hagen, Germany. In 2017 Glinka starred in the Russian drama film Nearest and Dearest (Близкие) in which she played the role of Efim's lover.

In 2024, she was suspended by the FEI for a positive human doping test. On 24 June the suspension was lifted, which led to the return of Moldova's individual spot at the 2024 Olympic Games. Glinka represented Moldova at the Olympics, marking it Moldova's first time in equestrian at the Olympic Games. She finished 53rd in the Grand Prix.
