= Lin Wenjun =

Chinese canoeist (born 1997)

Personal information
- Nationality: Chinese
- Born: 3 June 1997 (age 29) Sanming, Fujian, China
- Height: 1.68 m (5 ft 6 in)

Sport
- Country: China
- Sport: Sprint canoe
- Event: C-2 200 m
Medal record
Women's canoe sprint
Representing China
World Championships
Gold medal – first place	2019 Szeged	C-2 200 m
Gold medal – first place	2023 Duisburg	C-2 200 m
Gold medal – first place	2023 Duisburg	C-4 500 m
Silver medal – second place	2022 Dartmouth	C-2 200 m
Bronze medal – third place	2022 Dartmouth	C-1 200 m
Bronze medal – third place	2023 Duisburg	C-1 200 m
Bronze medal – third place	2026 Poznań	C-2 200 m
Asian Games
Gold medal – first place	2022 Hangzhou	C-2 200 m
Gold medal – first place	2022 Hangzhou	C-1 200 m
Asian Championships
Gold medal – first place	2017 Shanghai	C-4 200 m

Lin Wenjun (Chinese: 林文君; pinyin: Lín Wénjūn; born 3 June 1997) is a Chinese sprint canoeist.

She won a medal at the 2019 ICF Canoe Sprint World Championships.
