= Nevin Harrison =

American canoeist (born 2002)

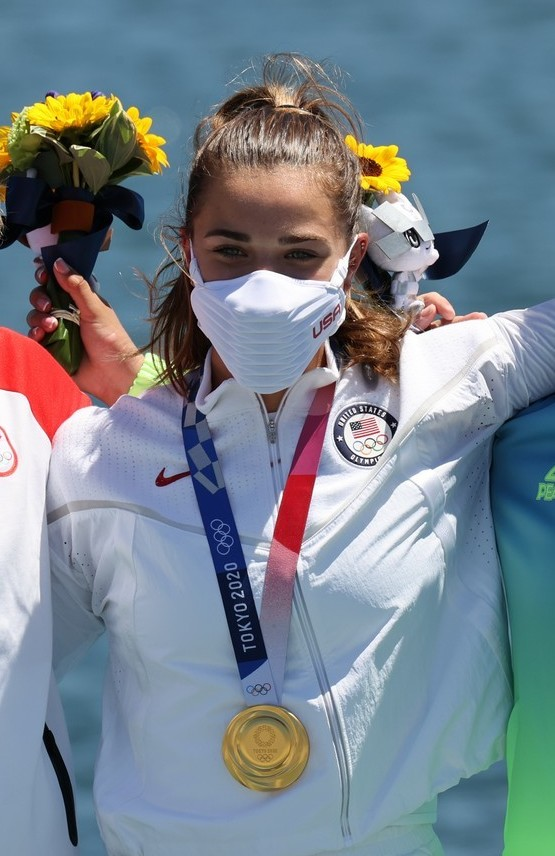
- Harrison at the 2020 Summer Olympics

Personal information
- Born: June 2, 2002 (age 24) Seattle, Washington, U.S.
- Height: 5 ft 9 in (175 cm)
- Weight: 160 lb (73 kg)

Sport
- Country: United States
- Sport: Sprint canoe
- Event: C-1 200 m
- Club: Lanier Canoe and Kayak Club
Medal record
Women's canoe sprint
Representing United States
Olympic Games
Gold medal – first place	2020 Tokyo	C-1 200 m
Silver medal – second place	2024 Paris	C-1 200 m
World Championships
Gold medal – first place	2019 Szeged	C-1 200 m
Gold medal – first place	2022 Dartmouth	C-1 200 m
Bronze medal – third place	2026 Poznań	C-1 200 m
Pan American Games
Gold medal – first place	2019 Lima	C-1 200 m

Nevin Harrison (/ˈnɛvɪn/ NEH-vin; born June 2, 2002) is an American sprint canoeist.

== Career ==
Harrison began canoeing at age 12 with the Seattle Canoe and Kayak Club in Seattle, Washington. She began competing for the United States at age 15, competing at the 2017 ICF Olympic Hopes Regatta in Račice, Czech Republic, winning silver in C-1 1000m, gold in 500m, and gold in 200m in the 2002 age group. The next year, at the 2018 ICF Olympic Hopes Regatta in Poznan, Poland, she won gold in C-1 500m and 200m in the 2002 age group. In 2019, she moved to the Lanier Canoe and Kayak Club Racing Team in Gainesville, Georgia to train with coach Zsolt Szadovszki. At the 2019 USA Team Trials in Oklahoma City, she won senior and junior C-1 1000m, 500m and 200m. She competed at the 2019 Pan American Games in Lima, Peru and won C-1 200m. At the 2019 ICF Canoe Sprint World Championships, she won gold in C-1 200m, becoming the first American to win a world championship in sprint canoe.

She competed at the 2020 Summer Olympics in Tokyo, winning the gold medal in the women's C-1 200 meters. At the 2024 Summer Olympics in Paris, she won the silver medal in the same event.
