= Bianka Nagy =

Hungarian canoeist (born 2000)

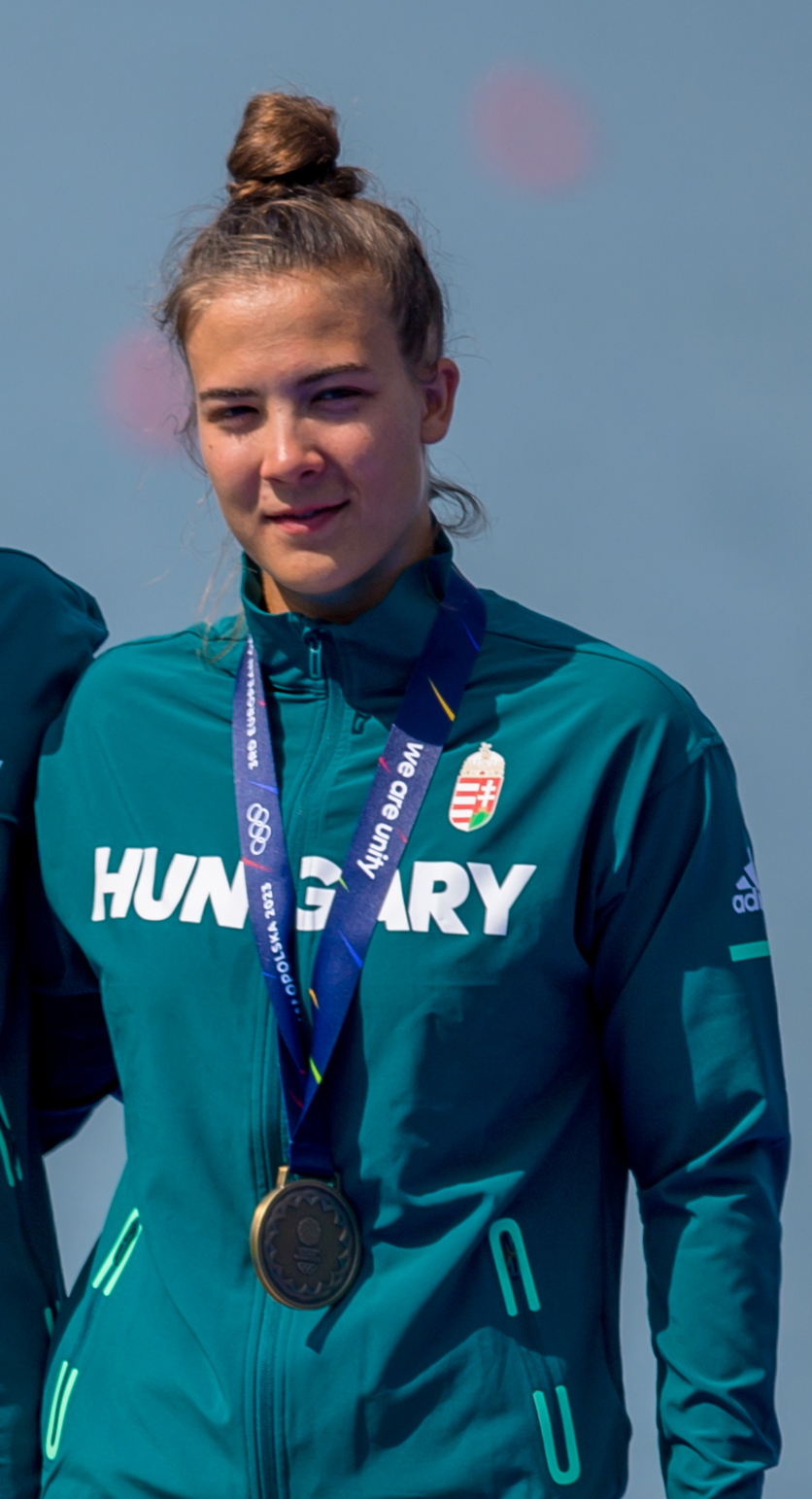

Personal information
- Nationality: Hungarian
- Born: 28 June 2000 (age 26)

Sport
- Country: Hungary
- Sport: Canoe sprint
Medal record
World Championships
Gold medal – first place	2025 Milan	C-4 500 m
Silver medal – second place	2026 Poznań	C-4 500 m
Bronze medal – third place	2021 Copenhagen	C-2 200 m
Bronze medal – third place	2022 Dartmouth	C-2 200 m
Bronze medal – third place	2022 Dartmouth	C-2 500 m
Bronze medal – third place	2022 Dartmouth	C-4 500 m
European Championships
Gold medal – first place	2022 Munich	C-2 200 m
Gold medal – first place	2024 Szeged	C-2 500 m
Silver medal – second place	2022 Munich	C-2 500 m
Silver medal – second place	2026 Montemor-o-Velho	C-2 500 m
Bronze medal – third place	2024 Szeged	C-2 200 m
Bronze medal – third place	2025 Racice	C-2 200 m
Bronze medal – third place	2025 Racice	C-2 500 m
European Games
Bronze medal – third place	2023 Kraków-Małopolska	C-2 500 m

Bianka Nagy (born 28 June 2000) is a Hungarian sprint canoeist.

== Career ==
She competed at the 2021 ICF Canoe Sprint World Championships, winning a bronze medal in the C-2 200 m distance.
