= Lisa Jahn =

German sprint canoer

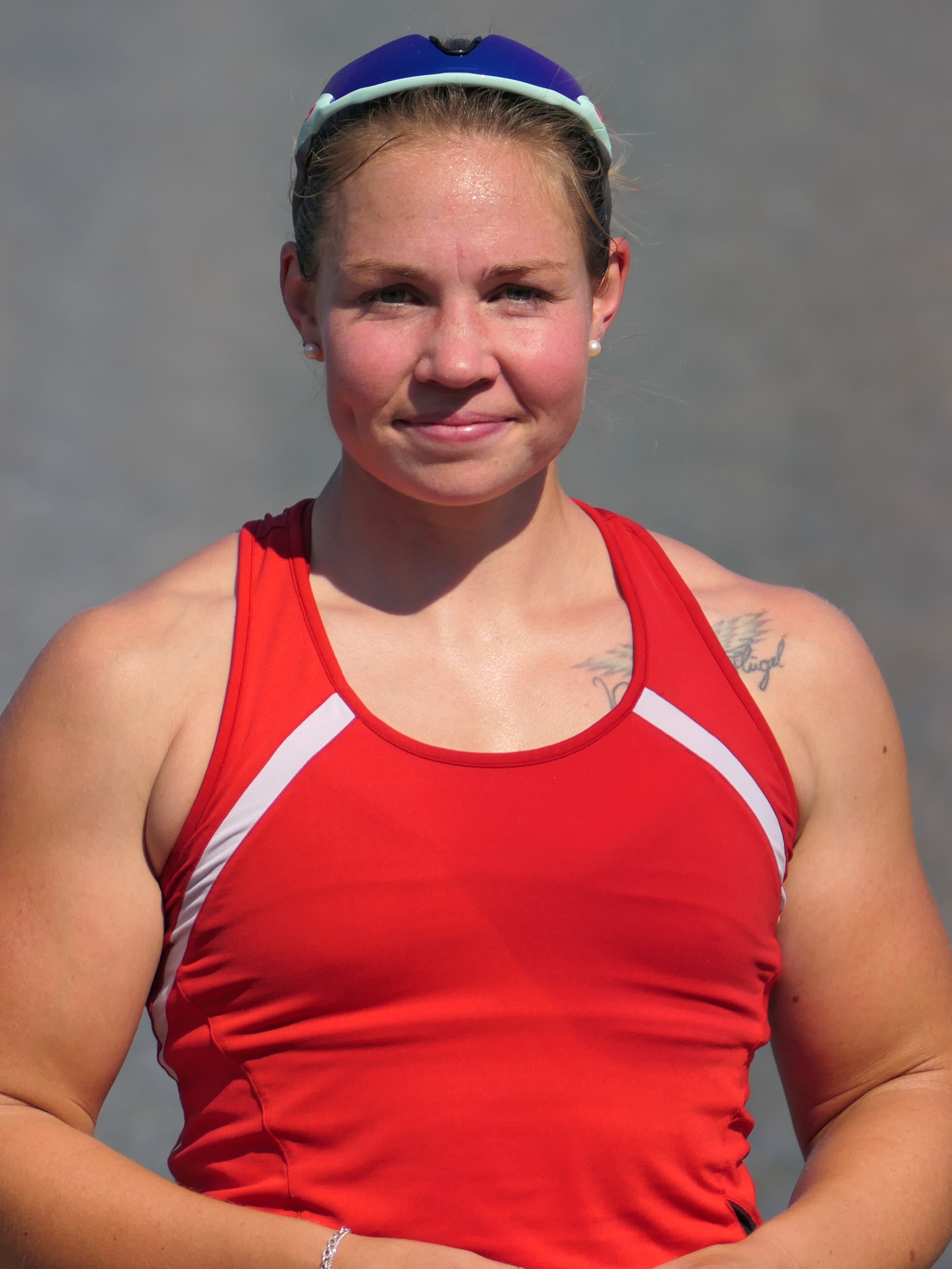

Personal information
- Nationality: German
- Born: 25 February 1994 (age 32) Berlin, Germany
- Height: 1.60 m (5 ft 3 in)
- Weight: 68 kg (150 lb)

Sport
- Country: Germany
- Sport: Canoe sprint
Medal record
Women's canoe sprint
Representing Germany
World Championships
Silver medal – second place	2023 Duisburg	C-4 500 m
Bronze medal – third place	2023 Duisburg	C-2 200 m
European Games
Silver medal – second place	2019 Minsk	C-1 200 m
European Championships
Silver medal – second place	2021 Poznań	C-2 500 m
Bronze medal – third place	2022 Munich	C-2 200 m

Lisa Jahn (born 25 February 1994) is a German sprint canoer.

Prior to participating in the sprint canoe event, Jahn competed in the kayak events. In 2019 she won the silver medal in single canoe at the European Games.

She qualified at the 2020 Summer Olympics, in the C-1 200 meters, and C-2 500 meters. The 2021 Olympic games would have been both Jahn's first time at the Olympics and the first time that sprint canoeing was an Olympic event.

She competed at the 2018 ICF Canoe Sprint World Championships, and at the 2021 Canoe Sprint World Cup.
