= Sophia Jensen =

Canadian sprint canoeist

Personal information
- Born: September 18, 2001 (age 25) Edmonton, Alberta, Canada
- Years active: 2016–present (in international competition)
- Website: sophiajensen.com

Sport
- Country: Canada
- Sport: Canoe sprint
- Events: C-1, C-2 and C-4
- Club: Cascades Canoe Club
- Partners: Julia Lilley Osende (women's C-2) and Alix Plomteux (mixed C-2)
- Former partner: Anna Roy-Cyr (2021 season)
- Coached by: Jan Kruk; Fred Loyer; Adam Mayo
Medal record
Women's canoe sprint
Representing Canada
World Championships
Gold medal – first place	2022 Dartmouth	C-4 500 m
Gold medal – first place	2026 Poznań	C-1 500 m
Silver medal – second place	2022 Dartmouth	C-1 500 m
Silver medal – second place	2026 Poznań	C-1 200 m
Bronze medal – third place	2023 Duisburg	C-4 500 m
ICF Canoe Sprint Junior and U23 World Championships
Gold medal – first place	2021 Montemor-o-Velho	C-1 200 m
Gold medal – first place	2021 Montemor-o-Velho	Mixed C-2 500 m
Silver medal – second place	2021 Montemor-o-Velho	C-4 500 m
Bronze medal – third place	2021 Montemor-o-Velho	C-2 500 m
Gold medal – first place	2019 Pitesti	C-1 200 m
Gold medal – first place	2019 Pitesti	C-1 500 m
Gold medal – first place	2019 Pitesti	C-2 500 m
Gold medal – first place	2018 Plovdiv	C-1 200 m
Gold medal – first place	2018 Plovdiv	C-1 500 m
Gold medal – first place	2018 Plovdiv	C-2 500 m
Pan American Canoe Championships
Gold medal – first place	2017 Ibarra	C-1 200 m
Gold medal – first place	2017 Ibarra	C-1 500 m
Gold medal – first place	2017 Ibarra	C-1 1000 m
Pan American Games
Bronze medal – third place	2023 Santiago	C-1 200 m

Sophia Jensen (born September 18, 2001) is a Canadian sprint canoeist. She has been a member of the Canoe Kayak Canada sprint national team since 2017. Jensen is considered to be an important figure in women's sprint canoe worldwide and, in 2019, she was named National Female Athlete of the Year at the Sports Québec annual gala.

Jensen competes in women's C-1 as well as with her current partner Julia Lilley Osende, from the canoe club Mic Mac AAC Canoe Club, in the women's C-2 event. During the 2021 season, Jensen competed with her now former partner Anna Roy-Cyr, from the Lac-Beauport Canoe Club, whilst Osende had temporarily withdrawn from competition. Jensen currently trains out of Cascades Canoe Club in Chelsea, Québec, Canada.

== Career ==
Jensen began sprint canoe at the age of 12 at Cascades Canoe Club after having moved to Chelsea, Quebec. In 2016, she made her international debut at the Olympic Hopes Regatta in Szeged, Hungary, where she won the gold medal in women's C-1 200m, C-1 500m, C-2 500m and C-2 1000m. She also won the silver medal in C-1 1000m and bronze in C-2 200m in Szeged. In 2017, at the Pan American Canoe Championships in Ibarra, Ecuador, Jensen dominated women's canoe by winning gold in the C-1 200m, C-1 500m and C-1 1000m events.

Jensen also won gold in the C-1 200m, C-1 500m and C-2 500m events at the 2018 ICF Sprint Canoe Junior and U23 World Championships in Plovdiv, Bulgaria.

At the 2019 ICF Sprint Canoe Junior and U23 World Championships in Pitești, Romania. Jensen won the gold medal in the C-1 200m, C-1 500m and C-2 500m events.

In 2021, at the ICF Junior and U23 Canoe Sprint World Championships in Montemor-o-Velho, Jensen won gold in the Women's C-1 200m as well as silver in the Women's C-4 500m and bronze in the Women's C-2 500m. Finally, she won the gold medal in the mixed C-2 500m with her partner Alix Plomteux.

== See also ==
- Canoe Kayak Canada
- Canoe sprint
