= Beauty Otuedo =

Nigerian sprint canoeist (born 1997)

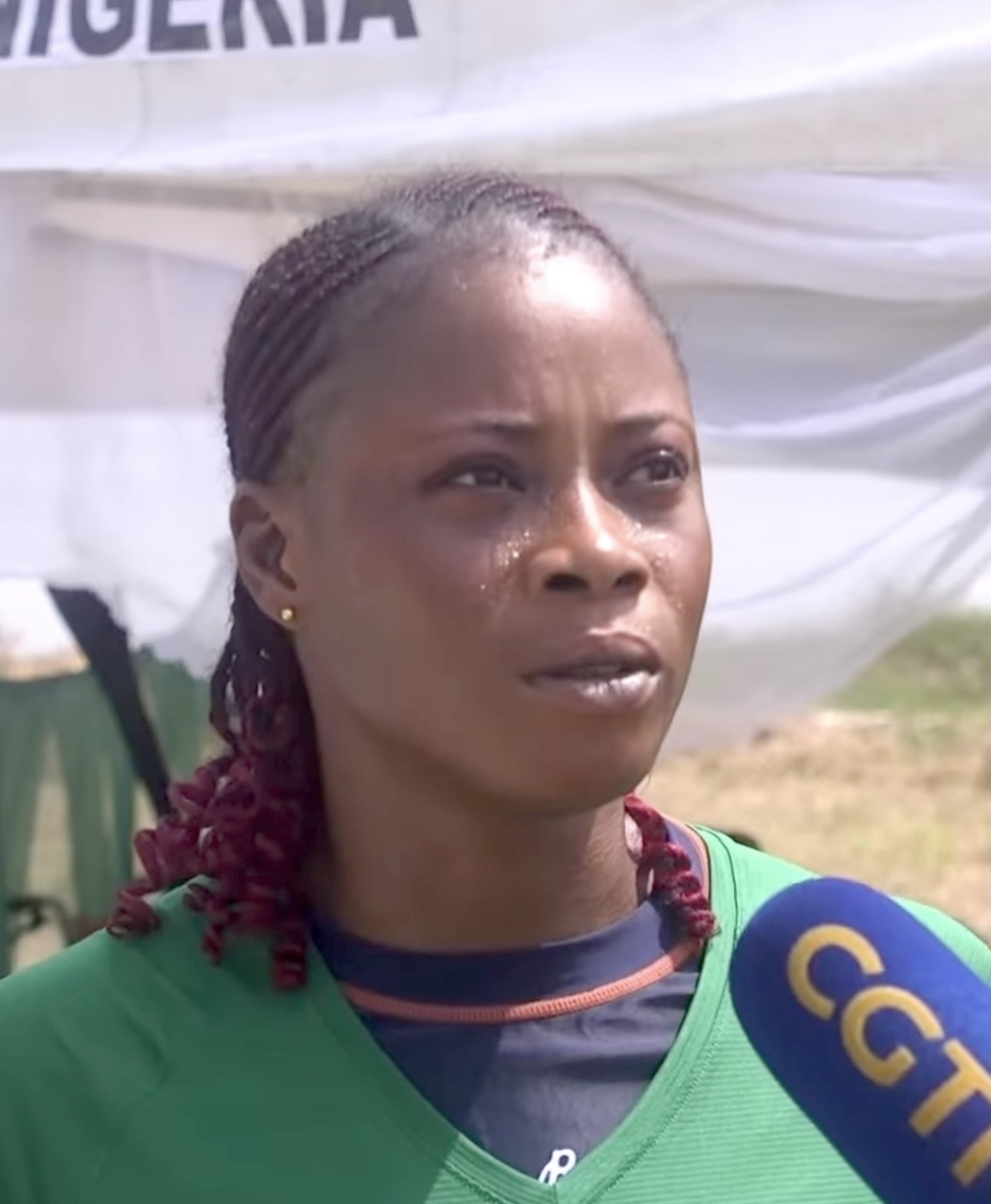
- Otuedo in 2023

Personal information
- Full name: Beauty Akinaere Otuedo
- Born: 10 October 1997 (age 28)

Sport
- Country: Nigeria
- Sport: Sprint canoeing

Beauty Akinaere Otuedo (born 10 October 1997) is a Nigerian sprint canoeist.

== Biography ==
Otuedo was born on 10 October 1997 into a fishing family.

In 2018, Otuedo won bronze at the African Admiral Porbeni national competition. She was coached by her brother Goodluck Gbamire.

Otuedo and Ayomide Bello won the Canoe Sprint African Paris 2024 Qualifier at Jabi Lake in Nigeria with a time of 2:24.45. They represented Nigeria at the 2024 Summer Olympics in Paris, France. They finished 5th in the first heat of the women's doubles 500 meters quarterfinals with a time of 2:07.86. Otuedo also competed in the singles 200 meters event.
