= Megha Pradeep =

Indian canoeist (born 2005)

Personal information
- National team: India
- Born: 8 February 2005 (age 21) Kuttanad,Alappuzha district,Kerala,India

Sport
- Country: India
- Sport: Canoeing

Megha Pradeep (born 8 February 2005) is an Indian canoeist from Kerala. She represents India in the Women's Canoe Singles 200 metres (C-1 200m), Mixed Canoe Doubles 500m (C-2 500m) and Women's Canoe Doubles 500 (C-2 500m) at the 2026 Asian Games in Japan. She entered the semifinals in the women's singles 200m heats finishing fifth.

== Early life ==
Megha is from Puthenkalathil, Kuttanad in Alappuzha district, Kerala. She is the daughter of N Pradeep and Sreekala. In 2015, she took up Canoeing in Class 5 at the age of 10 years, and joined the Sports Authority of India training centre in Alappuzha in 2017. She is the first Indian female canoeist to join the Indian Army. She joined through Agnipath scheme and is ranked Havildar.

== Career ==
At the Asian Games Canoe Sprint test event in 2026, she won a gold medal in 500 m singles and silver in 500 m doubles at Canoe Sprint at Miyoshi city, Japan.

In 2025, she became the first Indian woman to enter the finals of a 500 m singles at the Under-23 World Championship in Portugal. In 2024, Megha won a bronze medal in the women's women's singles C1 500m race in the Asian Canoe Sprint Championship at Tokyo. In 2023, she won a silver at the 2023 Junior Asian Championships. In 2023, she also represented India in women's C4 500m and finished 10th at the World Chamionships in Duisburg, Germany.

In October 2023, she reached the semifinals of the women's canoe single 200m sprint event at the 2022 Asian Games but could only finish fourth clocking 55.406 seconds.
