= Yarisleidis Cirilo =

Cuban sprint canoeist (born 2002)

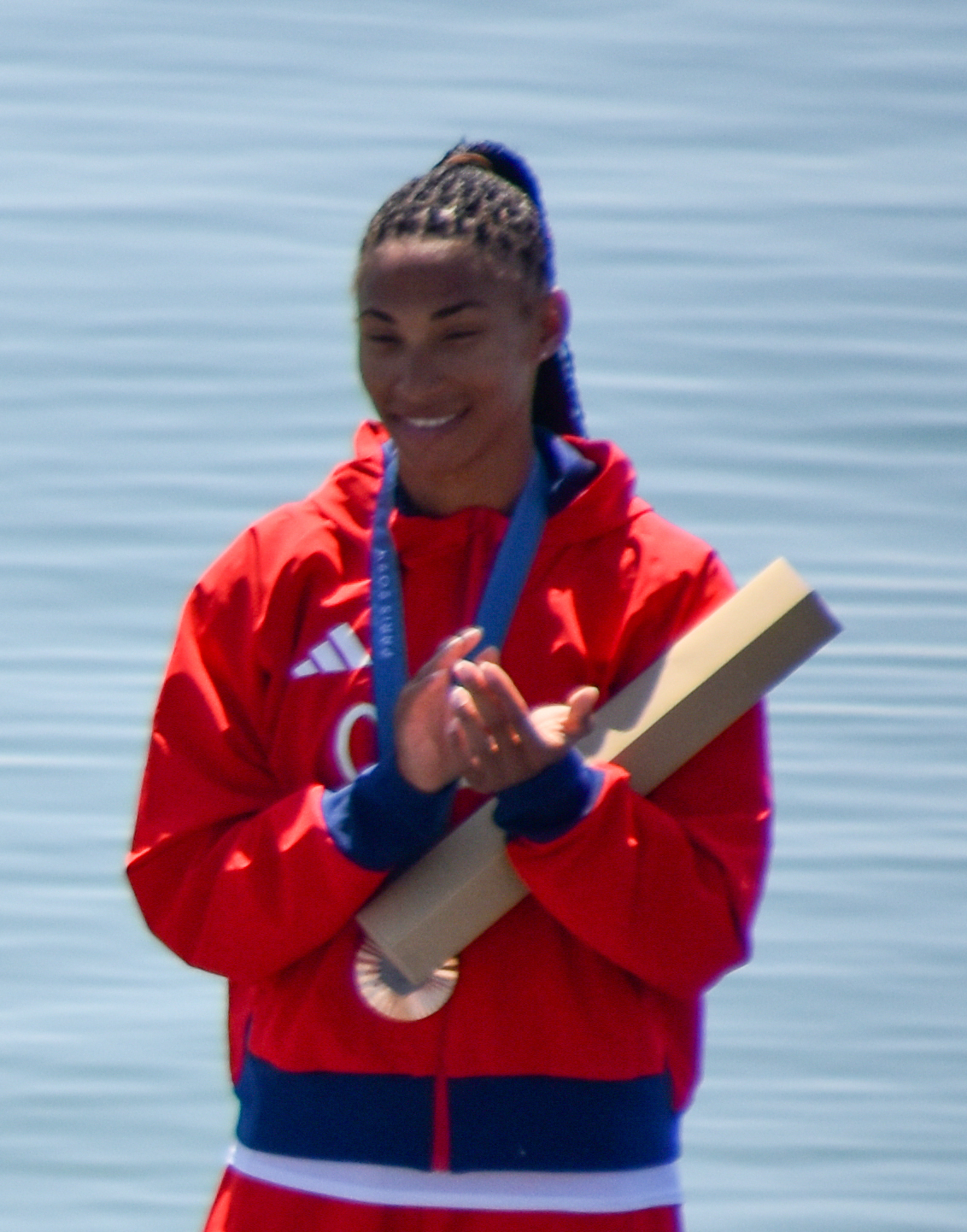
- Cirilo at the 2024 Summer Olympics

Personal information
- Full name: Yarisleidis Cirilo Duboys
- Born: 10 May 2002 (age 24) Guantánamo, Cuba

Sport
- Country: Cuba
- Sport: Canoe sprint
Medal record
Women's canoe sprint
Representing Cuba
Olympic Games
| Bronze medal – third place | 2024 Paris | C-1 200 m |
World Championships
| Gold medal – first place | 2022 Dartmouth | C-2 200 m |
| Gold medal – first place | 2023 Duisburg | C-1 200 m |
| Silver medal – second place | 2021 Copenhagen | C-2 200 m |
| Silver medal – second place | 2025 Milan | C-1 200 m |
| Bronze medal – third place | 2021 Copenhagen | C-2 500 m |
Pan American Games
| Gold medal – first place | 2023 Santiago | C-1 200 m |

Yarisleidis Cirilo Duboys (Note: In this Spanish name, the first or paternal surname is Cirilo and the second or maternal family name is Duboys.) (born 10 May 2002) is a Cuban sprint canoeist and politician.

She qualified at the 2020 Summer Olympics, in the C-1 200 meters, and C-2 500 meters.

She competed at the 2021 Canoe Sprint World Cup.

Nominated and approved as a candidate for the 2023 Cuban parliamentary election, she won majority approval of the voters in her Guantánamo district and was elected as a member of the National Assembly of People's Power.
