= Hungary at the 2023 European Games =

- IOC code: HUN
- NOC: Magyar Olimpiai Bizottság
- Website: olimpia.hu/esemenyek/krakko2023

in Kraków and Małopolska, Poland 21 June – 2 July 2023
- Competitors: 176
- Flag bearers: Dóra Madarász; Ádám Varga
- Medals: Gold 10 Silver 10 Bronze 18 Total 38

European Games appearances (overview)
- 2015; 2019; 2023; 2027

Hungary competed at the 2023 European Games, in Kraków and Małopolska, Poland, from 21 June to 2 July 2023.

== Medallists ==
Medal	Name(s)	Sport	Event
Gold	Eszter Mészáros; Zalán Pekler	Shooting	Mixed team 10 metre air rifle
Gold	Ádám Varga	Canoe sprint	Men's K-1 500m
Gold	István Péni; Zalán Pekler; Soma Hammerl	Shooting	Men's team 10 metre air rifle
Gold	Zalán Pekler	Shooting	Men's 50 metre rifle 3 positions
Gold	István Péni; Zalán Pekler; Soma Hammerl	Shooting	Men's team 50 metre rifle 3 positions
Gold	Balázs Katz; Lea Vasas	Teqball	Mixed doubles
Gold	Tibor Andrásfi; Máté Koch; Dávid Nagy; Gergely Siklósi	Fencing	Men's team épée
Gold	Balázs Katz; Csaba Banyik	Teqball	Men's doubles
Gold	Zsanett Janicsek; Lea Vasas	Teqball	Women's doubles
Gold	Martin Bálint	Kickboxing	Men's pointfighting 74 kg
Silver	Ádám Balog; Balázs Csuka; Norbert Gyene; Péter Hajdú; András John; László Kovácsovics; Attila Kun; László Nahaj; Csanád Neukum; Bence Rozmán; Patrik Vizes; Bence Zakics	Beach Handball	Men's tournament
Silver	Alida Dóra Gazsó	Canoe sprint	Women's K-1 500m
Silver	Bianka Kéri	Athletics	Women's 800 metres
Silver	Luana Márton	Taekwondo	Women's featherweight
Silver	Flóra Pásztor	Fencing	Women's individual foil
Silver	Nándor Ecseki; Dóra Madarász	Table tennis	Mixed doubles
Silver	Mihály Koleszár; Kamilla Réti	Modern pentathlon	Mixed relay
Silver	Anna Kun; Lili Büki; Eszter Muhari; Dorina Wimmer	Fencing	Women's team épée
Bronze	Giada Bragato; Bianka Nagy	Canoe sprint	Women's C-2 500m
Bronze	Alida Dóra Gazsó; Tamara Csipes	Canoe sprint	Women's K-2 500m
Bronze	Ágnes Kiss	Canoe sprint	Women's C-1 500m
Bronze	Luca Patakfalvy	Taekwondo	Women's bantamweight
Bronze	Áron Szilágyi	Fencing	Men's individual sabre
Bronze	Anna Kun	Fencing	Women's individual épée
Bronze	Kelen Bailey	Taekwondo	Men's middleweight
Bronze	Anna Hámori	Boxing	Women's welterweight
Bronze	Richárd Kovács	Boxing	Women's lightweight
Bronze	Sugár Katinka Battai; Renáta Katona; Liza Pusztai; Luca Szűcs	Fencing	Women's team sabre
Bronze	Gergely Kiss; Zsanett Bragmayer; Gergő Dobi; Márta Kropkó	Triathlon	Mixed relay
Bronze	Szonja Török	Kickboxing	Women's pointfighting 50 kg
Bronze	Roland Veres	Kickboxing	Men's pointfighting 63 kg

== Archery ==
Compound

Athlete	Event	Ranking round		Round of 16	Quarterfinals	Semifinals	Final / BM	
Athlete	Event	Score	Seed	Opposition Score	Opposition Score	Opposition Score	Opposition Score	Rank
László Szíjártó	Men's individual	700	13	Przybylski (POL); L 144–147	Did not advance			

Recurve

Athlete	Event	Ranking round		Round of 32	Round of 16	Quarterfinals	Semifinals	Final / BM	
Athlete	Event	Score	Seed	Opposition Score	Opposition Score	Opposition Score	Opposition Score	Opposition Score	Rank
Mátyás Balogh	Men's individual	641	37	Henckels (LUX); W 7–3	Roos (NED); L 2–6	Did not advance			

== Artistic swimming ==
Women

Athlete	Event	Qualification		Final	
Athlete	Event	Points	Rank	Points	Rank
Blanka Barbócz; Angelika Bastianelli	Duet free	147.7916	11 Q	124.0500	11
Blanka Barbócz; Angelika Bastianelli	Duet technical	—N/a		170.7866	15
Léna Fabos; Lilien Gotz; Szabina Hungler; Kíra Kecskés; Réka Márialigeti; Léna Szórát; Blanka Taksonyi; Roxána Uy; Hanga Czinder-Gali; Elina Veréb	Team acrobatic routine	—N/a		168.2534	6

== Athletics ==
Hungary is set to compete in the second division of the 2023 European Athletics Team Championships which is going to be held in Chorzów during the Games.

=== European Athletics Team Championships Second Division ===
Team	Event		Event points																			Total	Rank
Team	Event		100m	200m	400m	800m	1500m	5000m	110m h*	400m h	3000m SC	4 × 100 m	4 × 400 m**	SP	JT	HT	DT	PV	HJ	TJ	LJ	Total	Rank
Hungary	Team Championships Second Division	Men	5	13	16	15	12	8	15	10	16	14	12	8	13	15	10	11	11.5	11	12	456.5	1st place, gold medalist(s)
Hungary	Team Championships Second Division	Women	14	14	14	15	11	14	16	14	0	16	12	16	12	15	12	15	7	8	13	456.5	1st place, gold medalist(s)

key: h: hurdles; SC; Steeplechase: SP; Shot put: JT: Javelin: HT: Hammer: DT: Discus: PV: Pole vault: HJ: High jump: TJ: Triple Jump: LJ: Long Jump

: won the match event

- Women compete at 100 metre hurdles, rather than 110 metre hurdles.
- 4 x 400 metres is held as a single mixed sex event

=== Individual events at the 2023 European Games ===
As a participant in the Team event, each nation automatically enters one athlete in each of the individual events.

Event	Male Athlete	Score	Rank	Overall	Female athlete	Score	Rank	Overall
100 m	Bence Boros	10.64	12	32	Boglárka Takács	11.36	3	=11
200 m	Zoltán Wahl	20.92	4	12	Alexa Sulyán	23.25	3	13
400 m	Attila Molnár	45.30	1	6	Janka Molnár	51.74	3	11
800 m	Dániel Huller	1:47.11	2	8	Bianka Kéri	1:59.80	2	2nd place, silver medalist(s)
1500 m	István Szögi	3:43.30	5	16	Lili Anna Tóth	4:11.87	6	8
5000 m	Ferenc Soma Kovács	14:12.28	9	19	Viktória Wagner-Gyürkés	15:34.70	3	10
110/100 m h	Bálint Szeles	13.68	2	10	Luca Kozák	12.89	1	5
400m h	Árpád Bánóczy	51.69	7	23	Janka Molnár	56.86	3	13
3000m SC	István Palkovits	8:43.82	1	12	Zita Urbán	DNF		
4 × 100 m	Dominik Ilovszky; Bence Boros; Dániel Szabó; Patrik Bundschu	39.67	3	15	Gréta Kerekes; Jusztina Csóti; Boglárka Takács; Alexa Sulyán	43.49	1	6
4 × 400 m (mixed)	—N/a				Árpád Kovács; Fanni Rapai; Zoltán Wahl; Virág Simon	3:17.42	5	16
Shot put	Balázs Tóth	18.04	9	=26	Anita Márton	17.74	1	5
Javelin	Norbert Rivasz-Tóth	78.25	4	10	Angéla Moravcsik	58.51	5	11
Hammer	Donát Varga	73.75	2	6	Réka Gyurátz	67.15	2	11
Discus	Róbert Szikszai	59.80	7	14	Dóra Kerekes	54.10	5	12
Pole vault	Marcell Nagy	5.05	6	23	Hanga Klekner	4.45	2	8
High jump	Gergely Török	2.15	5	12	Fédra Fekete	1.84	7	=14
Triple Jump	Dániel Szenderffy	15.50	6	19	Beatrix Szabó	12.76	9	24
Long Jump	Kristóf Pap	7.67	5	=13	Diana Lesti	6.48	4	9

== Badminton ==
Athletes	Event	Group stage				Round of 16	Quarterfinals	Semifinals	Final	Rank
Athletes	Event	Opposition Score	Opposition Score	Opposition Score	Rank	Opposition Score	Opposition Score	Opposition Score	Opposition Score	Rank
Gergő Pytel	Men's singles	Popov (FRA); L 0–2	Abela (MLT); W 2–0	Špoljarec (CRO); W 2–0	2 Q	Popov (FRA); L 0–2	Did not advance			
Vivien Sándorházi	Women's singles	Tan (BEL); L 0–2	Nyqvist (FIN); W 2–0	Hamza (ITA); W 2–0	2 Q	Gilmour (GBR); L 1–2	Did not advance			

== Basketball ==
3x3

Team	Event	Group stage				Quarterfinals	Semifinals	Final / BM	
Team	Event	Opposition Score	Opposition Score	Opposition Score	Rank	Opposition Score	Opposition Score	Opposition Score	Rank
Hungary women's 3x3	Women's tournament	Czech Republic; L 15–21	France; L 8–22	Latvia; W 20–8	3	Did not advance			

== Beach handball ==
Summary

Key:

- ET: After extra time
- P – Match decided by penalty-shootout.

Team	Event	Group stage				Quarterfinal	Semifinal	Final / BM	
Team	Event	Opposition Score	Opposition Score	Opposition Score	Rank	Opposition Score	Opposition Score	Opposition Score	Rank
Hungary men's	Men's	Croatia; L 0–2	Germany; W 2–1	Portugal; W 2–0	2 Q	Poland; W 2–1	Portugal; W 2–0	Spain; L 1–2	2nd place, silver medalist(s)

== Boxing ==
Men

Athlete	Event	Round of 64	Round of 32	Round of 16	Quarterfinals	Semifinals	Final	
Athlete	Event	Opposition Result	Opposition Result	Opposition Result	Opposition Result	Opposition Result	Opposition Result	Rank
Attila Bernáth	Flyweight	—N/a	Alaverdian (ISR); W 4–1	Yusifzada (AZE); W 5–0	Serra (ITA); L 0–5	Did not advance		
Roland Veres	Featherweight	—N/a	Rustamov (AZE); W 5–0	Yildirim (GER); W 4–1	Ibrahim (SWE); L RSC R1	Did not advance		
Richárd Kovács	Lightweight	—N/a	Lavrenovas (LTU); W 5–0	Hovhannisyan (AZE); W 4–1	Sendrik (SRB); W 5–0	Guruli (GEO); L 0–5	Did not advance	3rd place, bronze medalist(s)
Soma Mester	Welterweight	Trofimciuk (LTU); L 0–5	Did not advance					
Pylyp Akilov	Middleweight	—N/a	Mironchikov (SRB); L 2–3	Did not advance				
Levente Kiss	Heavyweight	—N/a		Bereznicki (POL); L 2–3	Did not advance			
László Felföldi	Super heavyweight	—N/a	Simunovic (SLO); L 1–4	Did not advance				

Women

Athlete	Event	Round of 32	Round of 16	Quarterfinals	Semifinals	Final	
Athlete	Event	Opposition Result	Opposition Result	Opposition Result	Opposition Result	Opposition Result	Rank
Petra Mezei	Flyweight	—N/a	Radovanovic (SRB); L 0–5	Did not advance			
Hanna Lakotár	Bantamweight	Totova (CZE); W 4–1	Akbas (TUR); L 0–5	Did not advance			
Anna Hámori	Welterweight	Tojnárová (CZE); W 5–0	Angelsen (NOR); W 5–0	Beeloo (NED); W 5–0	Derieuw (BEL); L 0–5	Did not advance	3rd place, bronze medalist(s)
Tímea Nagy	Middleweight	—N/a	Michel (FRA); L 0–5	Did not advance			

== Canoe slalom ==
Kayak Cross

Athlete	Event	Qualification		Quarterfinal		Semifinal		Final	
Athlete	Event	Time	Rank	Time	Rank	Time	Rank	Time	Rank
Zita Lakner	Women's	90.53	35	Did not advance					

== Canoe sprint ==
Men

Athlete	Event	Heats		Semifinals		Final	
Athlete	Event	Time	Rank	Time	Rank	Time	Rank
Jonathán Hajdú	C-1 200 m	39.866	3 F	Bye		40.594	6
Balázs Adolf	C-1 500 m	1:51.564	5 SF	1:50.477	2 F	1:48.264	7
Jonathán Hajdú; Ádám Fekete	C-2 500 m	1:41.313	4 SF	1:43.273	1 FA	1:40.728	4
Ádám Varga	K-1 200 m	35.579	7 SF	36.275	6	Did not advance	
Ádám Varga	K-1 500 m	1:40.085	1 FA	Bye		1:36.212	1st place, gold medalist(s)
Bence Vajda; Tamás Szántói-Szabó	K-2 500 m	1:29.900	2 SF	1:31.581	3 FB	1:31.176	10
István Kuli; Kolos Csizmadia; Bence Nádas; Sándor Tótka	K-4 500 m	1:21.238	1 F	Bye		1:20.980	6

Women

Athlete	Event	Heats		Semifinals		Final	
Athlete	Event	Time	Rank	Time	Rank	Time	Rank
Virág Balla	C-1 200 m	47.718	4 SF	48.531	1 FA	49.011	6
Ágnes Kiss	C-1 500 m	Bye				2:04.576	3rd place, bronze medalist(s)
Giada Bragato; Bianka Nagy	C-2 500 m	1:59.473	1 F	Bye		1:59.163	3rd place, bronze medalist(s)
Anna Lucz	K-1 200 m	39.865	2 F	Bye		41.076	4
Alida Dóra Gazsó	K-1 500 m	1:54.001	1 FA	Bye		1:49.642	2nd place, silver medalist(s)
Alida Dóra Gazsó; Tamara Csipes	K-2 500 m	1:41.250	3 F	Bye		1:42.538	3rd place, bronze medalist(s)
Sára Fojt; Noémi Pupp; Alida Dóra Gazsó; Tamara Csipes	K-4 500 m	1:34.078	1 F	Bye		1:33.699	4

Mixed

Athlete	Event	Heats		Semifinals		Final	
Athlete	Event	Time	Rank	Time	Rank	Time	Rank
Ádám Fekete; Bianka Nagy	C-2 200 m	41.018	1 F	Bye		40.741	4
Bence Varga; Anna Lucz	K-2 200 m	35.381	2 SF	34.568	3 FA	35.772	9

== Cycling ==
=== Mountain bike ===
Athlete	Event	Time	Rank
Zsombor Palumby	Men's cross country	1:29.35	53
Virág Buzsáki	Women's cross country	1:27.06	30

=== BMX ===
Freestyle

Athlete	Event	Qualification		Final	
Athlete	Event	Points	Rank	Points	Rank
Zoltán Kempf	Men's park	74.66	10 Q	81.33	6
Zoltán Újváry	Men's park	79.83	4 Q	74.06	8

== Diving ==
Women

Athlete	Event	Preliminary		Final	
Athlete	Event	Points	Rank	Points	Rank
Patrícia Kun	3 m springboard	199.20	24	Did not advance	
Estella Mosena	3 m springboard	207.25	22	Did not advance	
Eszter Kovács; Estella Mosena	3 metre springboard synchro	—N/a		218.01	7
Estella Mosena	1 m springboard	185.05	23	Did not advance	

== Fencing ==
Men

Athlete	Event	Round of 64	Round of 32	Round of 16	Quarterfinals	Semifinals	Final / BM	
Athlete	Event	Opposition Result	Opposition Result	Opposition Result	Opposition Result	Opposition Result	Opposition Result	Rank
Tibor Andrásfi	Épée	Iskrov (BUL); W 15–6	Ibanez (ESP); L 11–15	Did not advance				
Máté Koch	Épée	Svensson (SWE); W 15–8	Heinzer (SUI); W 15–11	Frazao (POR); L 14–15	Did not advance			
Dávid Nagy	Épée	Tulen (NED); W 15–8	Favre (SUI); W 15–8	Tulen (NED); L 8–9	Did not advance			
Gergely Siklósi	Épée	Taurainen (FIN); L 13–15	Did not advance					
Tibor Andrásfi; Máté Koch; Dávid Nagy; Gergely Siklósi	Team épée	—N/a		Denmark; W 45–32	Spain; W 37–32	Italy; W 45–35	Switzerland; W 28–26	1st place, gold medalist(s)
Albert Bagdány	Foil	Rieger (GER); L 10–15	Did not advance					
Dániel Dósa	Foil	—N/a	Mepstead (GBR); L 13–15	Did not advance				
Gergő Szemes	Foil	Kuchta (SVK); W 15–7	Jurkiewicz (POL); W 15–7	Winterberg-Poulsen (DEN); L 13–15	Did not advance			
Gergely Tóth	Foil	Holý (CZE); W 15–14	Rzadkowski (POL); L 14–15	Did not advance				
Dániel Dósa; András Németh; Gergő Szemes; Gergely Tóth	Team foil	—N/a		Austria; W 45–31	Italy; L 33–45	Classification semifinal Ukraine; W 45–30	Placement final Poland; L 29–45	6
Tamás Decsi	Sabre	Webb (GBR); W MED	Yildirim (TUR); L 11–15	Did not advance				
Csanád Gémesi	Sabre	—N/a	Ursachi (ROU); L 13–15	Did not advance				
András Szatmári	Sabre	—N/a	Statsenko (UKR); W 15–10	Bazadze (GEO); L 9–15	Did not advance			
Áron Szilágyi	Sabre	—N/a	Bravo (ESP); W 15–2	Teodosiu (ROU); W 15–11	Kepmf (GER); W 15–8	Bazadze (GEO); L 13–15	—N/a	3rd place, bronze medalist(s)
Tamás Decsi; Csanád Gémesi; András Szatmári; Áron Szilágyi	Team sabre	—N/a		Azerbaijan; W 45–25	Georgia; W 45–28	France; L 42–45	Germany; L 28–45	4

Women

Athlete	Event	Round of 64	Round of 32	Round of 16	Quarterfinals	Semifinals	Final / BM	
Athlete	Event	Opposition Result	Opposition Result	Opposition Result	Opposition Result	Opposition Result	Opposition Result	Rank
Anna Kun	Épée	Bajorunaite-Stauske (LTU); W 15–7	Multerer (GER); W 15–10	Embrich (EST); W 15–11	Kapik-Miazga (POL); W 15–11	Swatowska-Wenglarczyk (POL); L 10–15	—N/a	3rd place, bronze medalist(s)
Eszter Muhari	Épée	Vandigenen (BEL); W 15–7	Sica (GBR); W 15–12	Brunner (SUI); W 15–4	Ehler (GER); L 12–15	Did not advance		
Jázmin Tóth	Épée	Beken (BEL); W 13–10	Rodopoulou (GRE); W 7–6	Kapik-Miazga (POL); L 5–15	Did not advance			
Dorina Wimmer	Épée	Miličić (SRB); W 15–9	Embrich (EST); L 8–15	Did not advance				
Lili Büki; Anna Kun; Eszter Muhari; Dorina Wimmer	Team épée	—N/a		Spain; W 38–35	Poland; W 45–39	Italy; W 38–31	France; L 33–34	2nd place, silver medalist(s)
Kata Kondricz	Foil	—N/a	Jeglinska (POL); W 15–13	Walczyk-Klimaszyk (POL); L 7–15	Did not advance			
Fanni Kreiss	Foil	—N/a	Castro (ESP); W 15–12	Lyczbinska (POL); L 6–7	Did not advance			
Dóra Lupkovics	Foil	Bimova (CZE); W 15–7	Beardmore (GBR); L 9–15	Did not advance				
Flóra Pásztor	Foil	—N/a	Schreiber (SWE); W 15–11	Wohlgemuth (AUT); W 15–4	Lyczbinska (POL); W 15–13	Kuritzky (ISR); W 15–7	Walczyk-Klimaszyk (POL); L 11–15	2nd place, silver medalist(s)
Kata Kondricz; Fanni Kreiss; Dóra Lupkovics; Flóra Pásztor	Team foil	—N/a		Moldova; W 45–23	Spain; W 45–28	Italy; L 35–45	Germany; L 38–45	4
Sugár Katinka Battai	Sabre	Did not advance						
Renáta Katona	Sabre	—N/a	Eifler (GER); W 15–12	Karimova (AZE); W 15–12	Passaro (ITA); L 9–15	Did not advance		
Liza Pusztai	Sabre	Did not advance						
Luca Szűcs	Sabre	—N/a	Wator (POL); L 13–15	Did not advance				
Sugár Katinka Battai; Renáta Katona; Liza Pusztai; Luca Szűcs	Team sabre	—N/a			Greece; W 45–30	Italy; L 40–45	Bulgaria; W 45–40	3rd place, bronze medalist(s)

== Judo ==
Mixed team

Athlete	Category	Round of 32	Round of 16	Quarterfinals	Semifinals	Final	
Athlete	Category	Opposition Result	Opposition Result	Opposition Result	Opposition Result	Opposition Result	Rank
Áron Szabó; Dániel Szegedi; Roland Gőz; Péter Sáfrány; Miklós Cirjenics; Richárd Sipőcz; Róza Gyertyás; Réka Pupp; Jennifer Czerlau; Szabina Gercsák; Nikolett Sági	Mixed team	Ukraine; W 4–1	Poland; W 4–1	Germany; L 3–4	Repechage; Portugal; L 3–4	Did not advance	

== Karate ==
Kata

Athlete	Event	Group stage				Semifinals	Final	
Athlete	Event	Opposition Result	Opposition Result	Opposition Result	Rank	Opposition Result	Opposition Result	Rank
Botond Nagy	Men's individual kata	Sofuoğlu (TUR); L 41.00 - 42.70	Busato (ITA); L 39.50 - 41.40	Szczypkowski (POL); W 41.00 - 38.90	3	Did not advance		

Kumite

Athlete	Event	Group stage				Semifinals	Final	
Athlete	Event	Opposition Result	Opposition Result	Opposition Result	Rank	Opposition Result	Opposition Result	Rank
Yves Martial Tadissi	Men's 67 kg	Aghalarzada (AZE); L 0–4	Xenos (GRE); L 3–5	Pisino (SUI); W 8–0	3	Did not advance		

== Kickboxing ==
Full contact

Athlete	Event	Quarterfinals	Semifinals	Final	
Athlete	Event	Opposition Result	Opposition Result	Opposition Result	Rank
Cintia Czégény	Women's 60 kg	Demiyarak (TUR); W 2–1	Straume (NOR); L 0–3	Did not advance	3rd place, bronze medalist(s)

Light contact

Athlete	Event	Quarterfinals	Semifinals	Final	
Athlete	Event	Opposition Result	Opposition Result	Opposition Result	Rank
Gergő Száraz	Men's 63 kg	Mederski (POL); W 3–0	Penzo (ITA); L 0–3	Did not advance	3rd place, bronze medalist(s)
Lajos Imre Fésű	Men's 79 kg	Stephenson (IRL); W 3–0	Men (TUR); W 3–0	Rmadan (GER); L 0–3	2nd place, silver medalist(s)
Rita Katalin Nagy	Women's 60 kg	Mendy (ITA); L 0–3	Did not advance		

Pointfighting

Athlete	Event	Quarterfinals	Semifinals	Final	
Athlete	Event	Opposition Result	Opposition Result	Opposition Result	Rank
Roland Veres	Men's 63 kg	McCann (IRL); W 23–13	Lanzialo (ITA); L 11–14	Did not advance	3rd place, bronze medalist(s)
Martin Bálint	Men's 74 kg	Botonjic (SLO); W 11–7	Bagarello (ITA); W 16–11	Tait (IRL); W 15–5	1st place, gold medalist(s)
Szonja Török	Women's 50 kg	Kilinc (TUR); W 8–4	Trovalusci (ITA); L 6–12	Did not advance	3rd place, bronze medalist(s)
Andrea Busa	Women's 60 kg	Bannon (IRL); W 20–13	Gulec (TUR); W 8–3	Ceci (ITA); L 4–7	2nd place, silver medalist(s)
Anna Kondár	Women's 70 kg	Hader (AUT); W 6–3	Angelino (ITA); L 8–9	Did not advance	3rd place, bronze medalist(s)

== Modern pentathlon ==
Men

Athlete	Event	Qualification											Semifinal												Final														
Athlete	Event	Fencing (épée one touch)			Swimming (200 m freestyle)			Combined: shooting/running (10 m air pistol)/(3200 m)			Total points	Final rank	Fencing (épée one touch)				Swimming (200 m freestyle)			Combined: shooting/running (10 m air pistol)/(3200 m)			Total points	Final rank	Fencing (épée one touch)				Riding (show jumping)			Swimming (200 m freestyle)			Combined: shooting/running (10 m air pistol)/(3200 m)			Total points	Final rank
Athlete	Event	RR	Rank	MP points	Time	Rank	MP points	Time	Rank	MP points	Total points	Final rank	RR	BR	Rank	MP points	Time	Rank	MP points	Time	Rank	MP points	Total points	Final rank	RR	BR	Rank	MP points	Penalties	Rank	MP points	Time	Rank	MP points	Time	Rank	MP points	Total points	Final rank
Csaba Böhm	Individual	12	22	194	1:59.30	5	312	10:16.60	2	684	1190	7 Q	19	220	1	220	1:58.70	1	313	10:21.60	10	679	1212	1 Q															3rd place, bronze medalist(s)
Bence Demeter	Individual	15	13	215	2:01.62	10	307	10:28.10	11	672	1194	14 Q	13	6	11	196	2:02.86	7	305	10:16.60	4	684	1185	11	Did not advance														
Mihály Koleszár	Individual	18	4	236	2:02.30	11	306	10:46.10	15	654	1196	2 Q	15	4	10	204	2:02.89	8	305	10:18.80	7	682	1191	10	Did not advance														
Balázs Szép	Individual	13	20	201	2:04.85	17	301	10:17.90	3	683	1185	15 Q	13	190	9	192	2:03.36	8	304	9:50.80	1	710	1206	9 Q															

Women

Athlete	Event	Qualification											Semifinal												Final														
Athlete	Event	Fencing (épée one touch)			Swimming (200 m freestyle)			Combined: shooting/running (10 m air pistol)/(3200 m)			Total points	Final rank	Fencing (épée one touch)				Swimming (200 m freestyle)			Combined: shooting/running (10 m air pistol)/(3200 m)			Total points	Final rank	Fencing (épée one touch)				Riding (show jumping)			Swimming (200 m freestyle)			Combined: shooting/running (10 m air pistol)/(3200 m)			Total points	Final rank
Athlete	Event	RR	Rank	MP points	Time	Rank	MP points	Time	Rank	MP points	Total points	Final rank	RR	BR	Rank	MP points	Time	Rank	MP points	Time	Rank	MP points	Total points	Final rank	RR	BR	Rank	MP points	Penalties	Rank	MP points	Time	Rank	MP points	Time	Rank	MP points	Total points	Final rank
Luca Barta	Individual	13	18	201	2:19.75	19	271	13:02.60	18	585	1057	18 Q	21	230	6	236	2:17.13	7	276	11:37.20	12	603	1115	4 Q															
Michelle Gulyás	Individual	18	7	236	2:10.02	1	290	12:01.70	7	579	1105	7 Q	17	210	8	212	2:09.51	1	291	11:31.10	8	609	1112	2 Q															
Blanka Guzi	Individual	10	25	180	2:14.94	6	281	10:57.80	10	643	1104	11 Q	10	175	18	175	2:15.14	4	280	10:48.90	1	652	1107	6 Q															
Kamilla Réti	Individual	14	16	208	2:27.53	25	255	13:17.40	20	579	1042	19	Did not advance												Did not advance														

Team

Athlete	Event	Fencing (épée one touch)				Riding (show jumping)			Swimming (200 m freestyle)			Combined: shooting/running (10 m air pistol)/(3200 m)			Total points	Final rank
Athlete	Event	RR	BR	Rank	MP points	Penalties	Rank	MP points	Time	Rank	MP points	Time	Rank	MP points	Total points	Final rank
Mihály Koleszár; Kamilla Réti	Mixed relay	16	0	1	236	7	7	293	2:01.50	10	307	12:15.90	6	565	1401	2nd place, silver medalist(s)

== Muaythai ==
Athlete	Event	Quarterfinals	Semifinals	Final	
Athlete	Event	Opposition Result	Opposition Result	Opposition Result	Rank
Ajsa Nardelotti	Women's 60 kg	Kocukas (TUR); L 27–30	Did not advance		

== Padel ==
Athlete	Event	Round of 32	Round of 16	Quarterfinals	Semifinals	Final / BM	
Athlete	Event	Opposition Score	Opposition Score	Opposition Score	Opposition Score	Opposition Score	Rank
Olivér Szakács; Marcell Urvölgyi	Men's doubles	Lindmeyer / Wunner (GER); L 1–6, 1–6	Did not advance				
Dóra Andrejszki; Pálma Juhász	Women's doubles	Behram / Girdo (SWE); L 4–6, 2–6	Did not advance				

== Shooting ==
Men

Athlete	Event	Qualification		Final	
Athlete	Event	Points	Rank	Points	Rank
Miklós Tátrai-Fejes	10 metre air pistol	567	33	Did not advance	
István Péni	10 metre air rifle	627.9	15	Did not advance	
Zalán Pekler	10 metre air rifle	628.3	12	Did not advance	
Csaba Bartók	25 metre rapid fire pistol	282	23	Did not advance	
István Péni	50 metre rifle 3 positions	586	19	Did not advance	
Zalán Pekler	50 metre rifle 3 positions	593	3 Q	Přívratský (CZE); W	1st place, gold medalist(s)
István Péni; Zalán Pekler; Soma Hammerl	Team 10 metre air rifle	628.3	1 Q	Sikavica/ Maričić; Gorša (CRO); W 16–2	1st place, gold medalist(s)
István Péni; Zalán Pekler; Soma Hammerl	Team 50 metre rifle 3 positions	881	2 Q	Czech Republic; W	1st place, gold medalist(s)

Women

Athlete	Event	Qualification		Final	
Athlete	Event	Points	Rank	Points	Rank
Veronika Major	10 metre air pistol	566	22	Did not advance	
Eszter Dénes	10 metre air rifle	627.8	10	Did not advance	
Eszter Mészáros	10 metre air rifle	624.3	29	Did not advance	
Veronika Major	25 metre pistol	586	1 Q	11	5
Renáta Sike	25 metre pistol	579	11	Did not advance	
Eszter Dénes	50 metre rifle 3 positions	582	16	Did not advance	
Eszter Mészáros	50 metre rifle 3 positions	586	11	Did not advance	
Bianka Pongrátz	Skeet	113	21	Did not advance	
Petra Tomor-Tones	Trap	106	27	Did not advance	
Veronika Major; Renáta Sike; Miriam Jakó	Team 10 metre air pistol	564	5	Did not advance	
Eszter Dénes; Eszter Mészáros; Gitta Bajos	Team 10 metre air rifle	626.2	4 Q	Stankiewicz/ Piotrowska; Kohanska (POL); L 5–17	4
Veronika Major; Renáta Sike; Miriam Jakó	Team 25 metre pistol	861	6 Q	Germany; L 12–16	4
Eszter Dénes; Eszter Mészáros; Dorina Lovász	Team 50 metre rifle 3 positions	870	6	Did not advance	

Mixed

Athlete	Event	Qualification		Final	
Athlete	Event	Points	Rank	Opposition Result	Rank
Veronika Major; Miklós Tátrai-Fejes	Team 10 metre air pistol	573	13	Did not advance	
Renáta Sike; Csaba Bartók	Team 10 metre air pistol	555	28	Did not advance	
Eszter Mészáros; Zalán Pekler	Team 10 metre air rifle	631.6	1 Q	Grande / Oviedo (ESP); W 17–7	1st place, gold medalist(s)
Eszter Dénes; István Péni	Team 10 metre air rifle	626.8	13	Did not advance	
Eszter Dénes; István Péni	Team 50 metre rifle 3 positions	862	12	Did not advance	
Eszter Mészáros; Zalán Pekler	Team 50 metre rifle 3 positions	579	5	Did not advance	

== Sport climbing ==
Lead

Athlete	Event	Semifinal		Final		
Athlete	Event	Hold	Rank	Hold	Time	Rank
Nimród Tusnády	Men's lead	34+	10 Q	8	0:39	10

== Table tennis ==
Men

Athlete	Event	Round 1	Round 2	Round of 32	Round of 16	Quarterfinals	Semifinals	Final / BM	
Athlete	Event	Opposition Result	Opposition Result	Opposition Result	Opposition Result	Opposition Result	Opposition Result	Opposition Result	Rank
Ádám Szudi	Singles	Bye	Rassenfosse (BEL); L 3–4	Did not advance					
Bence Majoros	Singles	Bye	Haug (NOR); L 2–4	Did not advance					

Women

Athlete	Event	Round 1	Round 2	Round of 32	Round of 16	Quarterfinals	Semifinals	Final / BM	
Athlete	Event	Opposition Result	Opposition Result	Opposition Result	Opposition Result	Opposition Result	Opposition Result	Opposition Result	Rank
Dóra Madarász	Singles	Bye	Degraef (BEL); W 4–0	Pesotska (UKR); W 4–2	Yang (MON); L 0–4	Did not advance			
Mercedes Nagyvárdai	Singles	Bye	Källberg (SWE); W 4–3	Shao (POR); L 0–4	Did not advance				
Bernadett Bálint; Dóra Madarász; Mercédesz Nagyváradi	Team	—N/a			Czech Republic; W 3–1	Romania; L 0–3	Did not advance		

Mixed

Athlete	Event	Round of 16	Quarterfinals	Semifinals	Final / BM	
Athlete	Event	Opposition Result	Opposition Result	Opposition Result	Opposition Result	Rank
Nándor Ecseki; Dóra Madarász	Doubles	Kulczycki / Wegrzyn (POL); W 3–2	Pištej / Balážová (SVK); W 3–0	Ionescu / Szőcs (ROU); W 3–0	Qiu / Mittelham (GER); L 0–3	2nd place, silver medalist(s)

== Taekwondo ==
Men

Athlete	Event	Round of 16	Quarterfinals	Semifinals	Repechage	Final / BM	
Athlete	Event	Opposition Result	Opposition Result	Opposition Result	Opposition Result	Opposition Result	Rank
Sharif Salim	Flyweight	Uscov (MLD); W 2–1	Ravet (FRA); L 0–2	Did not advance			
Levente Józsa	Featherweight	Jørgensen (DEN); L 0–2	Did not advance				
Kelen Bailey	Middleweight	Bondar (UKR); W 2–1	Divkovic (SLO); L 0–2	—N/a		Biçer (TUR); W 2–1	3rd place, bronze medalist(s)

Women

Athlete	Event	Round of 16	Quarterfinals	Semifinals	Repechage	Final / BM	
Athlete	Event	Opposition Result	Opposition Result	Opposition Result	Opposition Result	Opposition Result	Rank
Hanna Csáki	Finweight	Stojković (CRO); L 0–2	Did not advance		Goodman (GBR); L 0–2	Did not advance	
Luca Patakfalvy	Bantamweight	Lingbaek (DEN); W 2–0	McKew (GBR); W 2–1	Pérez (ESP); L 0–2	—N/a	Lager (ISR); W 2–0	3rd place, bronze medalist(s)
Luana Márton	Featherweight	Asemani (BEL); W 2–1	Kalteki (GRE); W 2–0	İlgün (TUR); W 2–1	—N/a	Jones (GBR); L 0–2	2nd place, silver medalist(s)
Csenge Patakfalvy	Lightweight	Szpak (POL); L 0–2	Did not advance				
Viviana Márton	Welterweight	Wiet-Hénin (FRA); L 0–2	Did not advance				
Rebeka Füredi	Middleweight	Uzuncavdar (TUR); L 0–2	Did not advance		Laurin (FRA); L 0–2	Did not advance	
Orsolya Padla	Heavyweight	Kus (TUR); L 0–2	Did not advance		Boyadzhieva (BUL); L 0–2	Did not advance	

== Teqball ==
Team	Event	Group stage				Quarterfinal	Semifinal	Final / BM	
Team	Event	Opposition Score	Opposition Score	Opposition Score	Rank	Opposition Score	Opposition Score	Opposition Score	Rank
Csaba Banyik	Men's singles	Zarkovic (MNE); W 2–0	Lombardi (ITA); W 2–0	—N/a	1 Q	Marojevic (SRB); W 2–1	Duszak (POL); L 0–2	Rabeux (FRA); L 0–2	4
Zsanett Janicsek	Women's singles	Vranic (CRO); W 2–0	Sommer (AUT); W 2–0	Lemajic (SRB); W 2–0	1 Q	Kristensen (DEN); L 0–2	Did not advance		
Csaba Banyik; Balázs Katz	Men's doubles	Montenegro; W 2–0	Kosovo; W 2–0	—N/a	1 Q	Ukraine; W 2–0	Poland; W 2–1	Serbia; W 2–1	1st place, gold medalist(s)
Zsanett Janicsek; Lea Vasas	Women's doubles	Ukraine; W 2–0	Portugal; W 2–0	—N/a	1 Q	Denmark; W 2–0	Poland; W 2–0	Romania; W 2–1	1st place, gold medalist(s)
Balázs Katz; Lea Vasas	Mixed doubles	Italy; W 2–0	Austria; W 2–0	Moldova; W 2–0	1 Q	Slovakia; W 2–0	Czech Republic; W 2–0	Serbia; W 2–0	1st place, gold medalist(s)

== Triathlon ==
Athlete	Event	Time	Rank
Gergő Dobi	Men's individual	1:49.06	24
Zsombor Dévay	Men's individual	DNF	
Gergely Kiss	Men's individual	1:48.58	23
Márta Kropkó	Women's individual	1:59.18	15
Noémi Sárszegi	Women's individual	2:03.58	31
Gergely Kiss; Zsanett Bragmayer; Gergő Dobi; Márta Kropkó	Mixed relay	1:07.40	3rd place, bronze medalist(s)
