= 2021 ICF Canoe Sprint World Championships – Women's C-2 200 metres =

Women's C-2 200 metres at the 2021 ICF Canoe Sprint World Championships
- Venue: Lake Bagsværd
- Location: Copenhagen, Denmark
- Dates: 17–19 September
- Competitors: 24 from 12 nations
- Winning time: 43.88

Medalists
gold medal	Patricia Coco; María Corbera	Spain
silver medal	Yarisleidis Cirilo; Katherin Nuevo	Cuba
bronze medal	Giada Bragato; Bianka Nagy	Hungary

The women's C-2 200 metres competition at the 2021 ICF Canoe Sprint World Championships in Copenhagen took place on Lake Bagsværd.

== Schedule ==
The schedule was as follows:

Date	Time	Round
Friday 17 September 2021	09:30	Heats
Friday 17 September 2021	16:15	Semifinal
Sunday 19 September 2021	11:34	Final

All times are Central European Summer Time (UTC+2)

== Results ==
=== Heats ===
The fastest three boats in each heat advanced directly to the final.
The next four fastest boats in each heat, plus the fastest remaining boat advanced to the semifinal.

==== Heat 1 ====
Rank	Canoeists	Country	Time	Notes
1	Yarisleidis Cirilo; Katherin Nuevo	Cuba	45.93	QF
2	Giada Bragato; Bianka Nagy	Hungary	46.24	QF
3	Sylwia Szczerbińska; Dorota Borowska	Poland	46.37	QF
4	Patricia Coco; María Corbera	Spain	46.69	QS
5	Karen Roco; María Mailliard	Chile	46.99	QS
6	Isabel Evans; Katie Reid	Great Britain	48.49	QS

==== Heat 2 ====
Rank	Canoeists	Country	Time	Notes
1	Anna Cyr; Sophia Jensen	Canada	46.68	QF
2	Yuliia Kolesnyk; Anastasiia Chetverikova	Ukraine	46.99	QF
3	Laura Ruiz; Eugénie Dorange	France	47.31	QF
4	Daniela Cociu; Maria Olărașu	Moldova	47.37	QS
5	Aliaksandra Kalaur; Volha Klimava	Belarus	49.00	QS
6	Jana Zetek; Martina Malíková	Czech Republic	49.32	QS

=== Semifinal ===
The fastest three boats advanced to the final.

Rank	Canoeists	Country	Time	Notes
1	Patricia Coco; María Corbera	Spain	45.19	QF
2	Daniela Cociu; Maria Olărașu	Moldova	45.58	QF
3	Karen Roco; María Mailliard	Chile	46.06	QF
4	Aliaksandra Kalaur; Volha Klimava	Belarus	46.39	
5	Isabel Evans; Katie Reid	Great Britain	46.91	
6	Jana Zetek; Martina Malíková	Czech Republic	48.76	

=== Final ===
Competitors raced for positions 1 to 9, with medals going to the top three.

Rank	Canoeists	Country	Time
1st place, gold medalist(s)	Patricia Coco; María Corbera	Spain	43.88
2nd place, silver medalist(s)	Yarisleidis Cirilo; Katherin Nuevo	Cuba	43.89
3rd place, bronze medalist(s)	Giada Bragato; Bianka Nagy	Hungary	44.37
4	Daniela Cociu; Maria Olărașu	Moldova	44.45
5	Sylwia Szczerbińska; Dorota Borowska	Poland	44.47
6	Yuliia Kolesnyk; Anastasiia Chetverikova	Ukraine	44.49
7	Karen Roco; María Mailliard	Chile	44.51
8	Anna Cyr; Sophia Jensen	Canada	44.56
9	Laura Ruiz; Eugénie Dorange	France	45.94
