= Beach handball at the 2023 European Games – Men's tournament =

Tournament details
- Host country: Poland
- Venue(s): Tarnów Beach Arena
- Dates: 20–22 June
- Teams: 8 (from 1 confederation)

Final positions
- Champions: Spain (1st title)
- Runners-up: Hungary
- Third place: Denmark
- Fourth place: Portugal

Tournament statistics
- Top scorer(s): (Norway) Kristoffer Henriksen (49 goals)

The men's beach handball tournament at the 2023 European Games was held from 20 to 22 June at the Tarnów Beach Arena.

== Preliminary round ==
All times are local (UTC+2).

=== Group A ===
Pos	Team	Pld	W	L	Pts	PW	PL	PD	GF	GA	GD
1	Croatia	3	3	0	6	6	0	+6	149	116	+33
2	Hungary	3	2	1	4	4	3	+1	135	141	−6
3	Germany	3	1	2	2	3	5	−2	148	155	−7
4	Portugal	3	0	3	0	1	6	−5	121	141	−20

Source: EG2023
Rules for classification: 1) Points; 2) Head-to-head points; 3) Head-to-head period difference; 4) Head-to-head goal point difference; 5) Head-to-head number of plus goal points; 6) Period difference; 7) Number of plus periods; 8) Goal point difference; 9) Number of plus goal points; 10) Draw.

20 June 2023; 10:00	Croatia	2–0	Germany	Tarnów Beach Arena 1
20 June 2023; 10:00	(27–24, 24–16); Report			Tarnów Beach Arena 1

20 June 2023; 10:00	Hungary	2–0	Portugal	Tarnów Beach Arena 2
20 June 2023; 10:00	(26–16, 18–16); Report			Tarnów Beach Arena 2

20 June 2023; 17:00	Portugal	0–2	Croatia	Tarnów Beach Arena 1
20 June 2023; 17:00	(24–26, 15–18); Report			Tarnów Beach Arena 1

20 June 2023; 17:00	Germany	1–2	Hungary	Tarnów Beach Arena 2
20 June 2023; 17:00	(24–25, 23–20, 8–9); Report			Tarnów Beach Arena 2

21 June 2023; 12:00	Croatia	2–0	Hungary	Tarnów Beach Arena 1
21 June 2023; 12:00	(26–19, 28–18); Report			Tarnów Beach Arena 1

21 June 2023; 12:00	Portugal	1–2	Germany	Tarnów Beach Arena 2
21 June 2023; 12:00	(24–31, 18–12, 8–10); Report			Tarnów Beach Arena 2

=== Group B ===
Pos	Team	Pld	W	L	Pts	PW	PL	PD	GF	GA	GD
1	Norway	3	2	1	4 (Note: Spain 0–2 Norway)	4	2	+2	133	131	+2
2	Spain	3	2	1	4	4	2	+2	128	110	+18
3	Poland (H)	3	1	2	2 (Note: Denmark 1–2 Poland)	2	5	−3	127	144	−17
4	Denmark	3	1	2	2	3	4	−1	142	145	−3

Source: EG2023
Rules for classification: 1) Points; 2) Head-to-head points; 3) Head-to-head period difference; 4) Head-to-head goal point difference; 5) Head-to-head number of plus goal points; 6) Period difference; 7) Number of plus periods; 8) Goal point difference; 9) Number of plus goal points; 10) Draw.
(H) Host
Notes:

20 June 2023; 11:00	Spain	0–2	Norway	Tarnów Beach Arena 2
20 June 2023; 11:00	(20–21, 20–22); Report			Tarnów Beach Arena 2

20 June 2023; 11:00	Denmark	1–2	Poland	Tarnów Beach Arena 2
20 June 2023; 11:00	(24–26, 22–17, 10–12); Report			Tarnów Beach Arena 2

20 June 2023; 18:00	Poland	0–2	Spain	Tarnów Beach Arena 1
20 June 2023; 18:00	(12–22, 18–22); Report			Tarnów Beach Arena 1

20 June 2023; 18:00	Norway	0–2	Denmark	Tarnów Beach Arena 2
20 June 2023; 18:00	(18–19, 28–30); Report			Tarnów Beach Arena 2

21 June 2023; 11:00	Spain	2–0	Denmark	Tarnów Beach Arena 2
21 June 2023; 11:00	(21–19, 23–18); Report			Tarnów Beach Arena 2

21 June 2023; 11:00	Poland	0–2	Norway	Tarnów Beach Arena 1
21 June 2023; 11:00	(20–21, 22–23); Report			Tarnów Beach Arena 1

== Final round ==
=== Bracket ===
Quarter-finals
21 June
Croatia	1
Denmark	2
21 June
Spain	2
Germany	1
21 June
Norway	1
Portugal	2
21 June
Hungary	2
Poland	1

Semifinals
22 June
Denmark	1
Spain	2
22 June
Portugal	0
Hungary	2

Gold medal game
22 June
Spain	2
Hungary	1
Bronze medal game
22 June
Denmark	2
Portugal	1

5–8th place semifinals
22 June
Croatia	2
Germany	0
22 June
Norway	2
Poland	0

Fifth place game
22 June
Croatia	2
Norway	1
Seventh place game
22 June
Germany	2
Poland	1

=== Quarterfinals ===
21 June 2023; 16:45	Croatia	1–2	Denmark	Tarnów Beach Arena 2
21 June 2023; 16:45	(22–25, 23–20, 12–13); Report			Tarnów Beach Arena 2

21 June 2023; 16:45	Hungary	2–1	Poland	Tarnów Beach Arena 1
21 June 2023; 16:45	(25–16, 20–21, 6–4); Report			Tarnów Beach Arena 1

21 June 2023; 17:45	Norway	1–2	Portugal	Tarnów Beach Arena 1
21 June 2023; 17:45	(22–20, 17–20, 4–8); Report			Tarnów Beach Arena 1

21 June 2023; 17:45	Spain	2–1	Germany	Tarnów Beach Arena 2
21 June 2023; 17:45	(23–20, 24–25, 9–8); Report			Tarnów Beach Arena 2

=== 5–8th place semifinals ===
22 June 2023; 10:00	Croatia	2–0	Germany	Tarnów Beach Arena 2
22 June 2023; 10:00	(28–23, 31–26); Report			Tarnów Beach Arena 2

22 June 2023; 11:00	Norway	2–0	Poland	Tarnów Beach Arena 2
22 June 2023; 11:00	(19–12, 23–20); Report			Tarnów Beach Arena 2

=== Semifinals ===
22 June 2023; 10:00	Denmark	1–2	Spain	Tarnów Beach Arena 1
22 June 2023; 10:00	(20–21, 25–20, 8–9); Report			Tarnów Beach Arena 1

22 June 2023; 11:00	Portugal	0–2	Hungary	Tarnów Beach Arena 1
22 June 2023; 11:00	(20–22, 14–20); Report			Tarnów Beach Arena 1

=== Seventh place game ===
22 June 2023; 16:30	Germany	2–1	Poland	Tarnów Beach Arena 2
22 June 2023; 16:30	(21–18, 20–24, 9–8); Report			Tarnów Beach Arena 2

=== Fifth place game ===
22 June 2023; 16:30	Croatia	2–1	Norway	Tarnów Beach Arena 1
22 June 2023; 16:30	(29–22, 22–23, 7–4); Report			Tarnów Beach Arena 1

=== Bronze medal game ===
22 June 2023; 18:30	Denmark	2–1	Portugal	Tarnów Beach Arena 1
22 June 2023; 18:30	(10–20, 23–18, 8–6); Report			Tarnów Beach Arena 1

=== Gold medal game ===
22 June 2023; 20:30	Spain	2–1	Hungary	Tarnów Beach Arena 1
22 June 2023; 20:30	(23–22, 24–25, 13–12); Report			Tarnów Beach Arena 1

== Final standings ==
Rank	Team
1st place, gold medalist(s)	Spain
2nd place, silver medalist(s)	Hungary
3rd place, bronze medalist(s)	Denmark
4	Portugal
5	Croatia
6	Norway
7	Germany
8	Poland

== See also ==
- Beach handball at the 2023 European Games – Women's tournament
