= 2021 ICF Canoe Sprint World Championships – Women's C-4 500 metres =

Competition

Women's C-4 500 metres at the 2021 ICF Canoe Sprint World Championships
- Venue: Lake Bagsværd
- Location: Copenhagen, Denmark
- Dates: 19 September
- Competitors: 24 from 6 nations
- Winning time: 1:48.62

Medalists
| gold medal | Alena Nazdrova; Nadzeya Makarchanka; Aliaksandra Kalaur; Volha Klimava | Belarus |
| silver medal | Virág Balla; Kincső Takács; Laura Gönczöl; Réka Opavszky | Hungary |
| bronze medal | Liudmyla Luzan; Olena Tsyhankova; Yuliia Kolesnyk; Anastasiia Chetverikova | Ukraine |

The women's C-4 500 metres competition at the 2021 ICF Canoe Sprint World Championships in Copenhagen took place on Lake Bagsværd.

== Schedule ==
The schedule was as follows:

| Date | Time | Round |
|---|---|---|
| Sunday 19 September 2021 | 12:15 | Final |

All times are Central European Summer Time (UTC+2)

== Results ==
With fewer than ten boats entered, this event was held as a direct final.

| Rank | Canoeists | Country | Time |
|---|---|---|---|
| 1st place, gold medalist(s) | Alena Nazdrova; Nadzeya Makarchanka; Aliaksandra Kalaur; Volha Klimava | Belarus | 1:48.62 |
| 2nd place, silver medalist(s) | Virág Balla; Kincső Takács; Laura Gönczöl; Réka Opavszky | Hungary | 1:49.50 |
| 3rd place, bronze medalist(s) | Liudmyla Luzan; Olena Tsyhankova; Yuliia Kolesnyk; Anastasiia Chetverikova | Ukraine | 1:49.79 |
| 4 | Sylwia Szczerbińska; Aleksandra Jacewicz; Magda Stanny; Julia Walczak | Poland | 1:50.72 |
| 5 | Arina Khozhainova; Alina Kovaleva; Eleonora Kovalchuk; Daria Kharchenko | RCF | 1:51.81 |
| 6 | Anaïs Cattelet; Eugénie Dorange; Laura Ruiz; Axelle Renard | France | 1:57.74 |
