= Shooting at the 2023 European Games – Mixed team 10 metre air pistol =

Mixed team 10 metre air pistol at the 2023 European Games
- Venue: Wrocław Shooting Centre
- Dates: 23 June
- Competitors: 56 from 21 nations
- Teams: 28

Medalists
gold medal	Sara Costantino; Paolo Monna	Italy
silver medal	Elmira Karapetyan; Benik Khlghatyan	Armenia
bronze medal	Antoaneta Kostadinova; Samuil Donkov	Bulgaria

The mixed team 10 metre air pistol event at the 2023 European Games took place on 23 June at the Wrocław Shooting Centre.

== Records ==
Prior to this competition, the existing world, European and Games records were as follows.

Qualification
World Record	India; Manu Bhaker; Saurabh Chaudhary	587	Osijek, Croatia	26 June 2021
European Record	Russia; Vitalina Batsarashkina; Artem Chernousov	586	Osijek, Croatia	26 June 2021
Games Record	Bulgaria; Maria Grozdeva; Samuil Donkov	581	Minsk, Belarus	23 June 2019

== Results ==
=== Qualification ===
Rank	Country	Athlete	Series			Total	Team total	Notes
Rank	Country	Athlete	1	2	3	Total	Team total	Notes
1	Italy 1	Sara Costantino	96	97	95	288-9x	581-24x	QG, =GR
1	Italy 1	Paolo Monna	97	97	99	293-15x	581-24x	QG, =GR
2	Armenia	Elmira Karapetyan	97	98	97	292-12x	581-19x	QG, =GR
2	Armenia	Benik Khlghatyan	98	97	94	289-7x	581-19x	QG, =GR
3	Italy 2	Maria Varricchio	99	97	94	290-13x	578-22x	QB
3	Italy 2	Federico Maldini	96	97	95	288-9x	578-22x	QB
4	Bulgaria	Antoaneta Kostadinova	95	94	97	286-10x	576-24x	QB
4	Bulgaria	Samuil Donkov	96	98	96	290-14x	576-24x	QB
5	Greece	Anna Korakaki	95	98	98	291-9x	576-12x	
5	Greece	Dionysios Korakakis	93	97	95	285-3x	576-12x	
6	Czech Republic 2	Anna Miřejovská	94	95	94	283-2x	576-11x	
6	Czech Republic 2	Pavel Schejbal	97	97	99	293-9x	576-11x	
7	Ukraine 1	Olena Kostevych	98	96	97	291-8x	575-16x	
7	Ukraine 1	Pavlo Korostylov	92	94	98	284-8x	575-16x	
8	Austria	Sylvia Steiner	97	97	98	292-6x	575-15x	
8	Austria	Richard Zechmeister	97	95	91	283-9x	575-15x	
9	Serbia	Zorana Arunović	95	93	98	286-8x	574-17x	
9	Serbia	Damir Mikec	95	97	96	288-9x	574-17x	
10	Norway	Ann Helen Aune	93	95	96	284-8x	574-16x	
10	Norway	Ole-Harald Aas	96	96	98	290-8x	574-16x	
11	Czech Republic 1	Veronika Schejbalová	95	97	93	285-9x	573-18x	
11	Czech Republic 1	Jindřich Dubový	95	96	97	288-9x	573-18x	
12	France	Camille Jedrzejewski	98	97	97	292-11x	573-17x	
12	France	Florian Fouquet	93	95	93	281-6x	573-17x	
13	Hungary 1	Veronika Major	99	94	95	288-10x	573-15x	
13	Hungary 1	Miklós Tátrai-Fejes	94	93	98	285-5x	573-15x	
14	Spain	Sonia Franquet	96	96	95	287-10x	573-15x	
14	Spain	Martín Freije	96	93	97	286-5x	573-15x	
15	Poland 1	Klaudia Breś	94	99	96	289-7x	572-14x	
15	Poland 1	Grzegorz Długosz	91	96	96	283-7x	572-14x	
16	Turkey	Şevval İlayda Tarhan	97	94	95	286-5x	572-14x	
16	Turkey	Yusuf Dikeç	94	97	95	286-9x	572-14x	
17	Azerbaijan	Nigar Nasirova	95	94	94	283-3x	572-10x	
17	Azerbaijan	Ruslan Lunev	98	97	94	289-7x	572-10x	
18	Latvia	Agate Rašmane	93	96	93	282-6x	571-16x	
18	Latvia	Lauris Strautmanis	98	95	96	289-10x	571-16x	
19	Ukraine 2	Polina Kolesnikova	90	93	96	279-6x	570-18x	
19	Ukraine 2	Viktor Bankin	95	98	98	291-12x	570-18x	
20	Germany 1	Sandra Reitz	94	95	94	283-7x	570-15x	
20	Germany 1	Robin Walter	94	96	97	287-8x	570-15x	
21	Germany 2	Doreen Vennekamp	92	92	97	281-7x	569-19x	
21	Germany 2	Michael Schwald	95	97	96	288-12x	569-19x	
22	Sweden	Vendela Sorensson	96	92	92	280-6x	567-9x	
22	Sweden	Morgan Johansson Cropper	95	96	96	287-3x	567-9x	
23	Great Britain	Jessica Liddon	92	94	94	280-6x	566-12x	
23	Great Britain	Kristian Callaghan	94	96	96	286-6x	566-12x	
24	Georgia 2	Mariami Prodiashvili	96	93	94	283-5x	566-12x	
24	Georgia 2	Levan Kadagidze	95	94	94	283-7x	566-12x	
25	Portugal	Joana Castelão	88	96	92	276-6x	561-14x	
25	Portugal	João Costa	94	96	95	285-8x	561-14x	
26	Georgia 1	Lizi Kiladze	90	93	94	277-8x	561-13x	
26	Georgia 1	Kako Mosulishvili	95	97	92	284-5x	561-13x	
27	Hungary 2	Renáta Sike	97	92	96	285-9x	555-15x	
27	Hungary 2	Csaba Bartók	88	93	89	270-6x	555-15x	
28	Poland 2	Julita Borek	92	95	83	270-3x	551-9x	
28	Poland 2	Oskar Miliwek	95	93	93	281-6x	551-9x	

=== Finals ===
Rank	Country	Athletes	Total
Gold medal match
1st place, gold medalist(s)	Italy 1	Sara Costantino; Paolo Monna	17
2nd place, silver medalist(s)	Armenia	Elmira Karapetyan; Benik Khlghatyan	7
Bronze medal match
3rd place, bronze medalist(s)	Bulgaria	Antoaneta Kostadinova; Samuil Donkov	16
4	Italy 2	Maria Varricchio; Federico Maldini	2
