= Beach handball at the 2023 European Games – Women's tournament =

International sporting competition

Tournament details
- Host country: Poland
- Venue(s): Tarnów Beach Arena
- Dates: 20–22 June
- Teams: 8 (from 1 confederation)

Final positions
- Champions: Denmark (1st title)
- Runners-up: Spain
- Third place: Germany
- Fourth place: Norway

Tournament statistics
- Top scorer(s): (Denmark) Line Gyldenløve Kristensen (56 goals)

The women's beach handball tournament at the 2023 European Games was held from 20 to 22 June at the Tarnów Beach Arena.

== Preliminary round ==
All times are local (UTC+2).

=== Group A ===
Pos	Team	Pld	W	L	Pts	PW	PL	PD	GF	GA	GD
1	Denmark	3	3	0	6	6	1	+5	149	123	+26
2	Spain	3	1	2	2 (Note: Spain 2 Pts, 0 PD, +23 GD; Poland 2 Pts, 0 PD, –9 GD; Norway 2 Pts, 0 PD, –14 GD)	3	4	−1	148	131	+17
3	Poland (H)	3	1	2	2	3	5	−2	118	139	−21
4	Norway	3	1	2	2	4	5	−1	125	147	−22

Source: EG2023
Rules for classification: 1) Points; 2) Head-to-head points; 3) Head-to-head period difference; 4) Head-to-head goal point difference; 5) Head-to-head number of plus goal points; 6) Period difference; 7) Number of plus periods; 8) Goal point difference; 9) Number of plus goal points; 10) Draw.
(H) Host
Notes:

20 June 2023; 12:00	Spain	0–2	Denmark	Tarnów Beach Arena 2
20 June 2023; 12:00	(22–27, 22–23); Report			Tarnów Beach Arena 2

20 June 2023; 12:00	Poland	1–2	Norway	Tarnów Beach Arena 2
20 June 2023; 12:00	(25–21, 10–18, 4–5); Report			Tarnów Beach Arena 2

20 June 2023; 19:00	Norway	1–2	Spain	Tarnów Beach Arena 2
20 June 2023; 19:00	(22–20, 12–23, 0–10); Report			Tarnów Beach Arena 2

20 June 2023; 19:00	Denmark	2–0	Poland	Tarnów Beach Arena 1
20 June 2023; 19:00	(20–14, 24–18); Report			Tarnów Beach Arena 1

21 June 2023; 10:00	Spain	1–2	Poland	Tarnów Beach Arena 1
21 June 2023; 10:00	(19–20, 26–18, 6–9); Report			Tarnów Beach Arena 1

21 June 2023; 10:00	Norway	1–2	Denmark	Tarnów Beach Arena 2
21 June 2023; 10:00	(22–25, 23–22, 2–8); Report			Tarnów Beach Arena 2

=== Group B ===
Pos	Team	Pld	W	L	Pts	PW	PL	PD	GF	GA	GD
1	Netherlands	3	3	0	6	6	0	+6	145	98	+47
2	Germany	3	2	1	4	4	2	+2	142	126	+16
3	Greece	3	1	2	2	2	5	−3	116	142	−26
4	Portugal	3	0	3	0	1	6	−5	102	139	−37

Source: EG2023
Rules for classification: 1) Points; 2) Head-to-head points; 3) Head-to-head period difference; 4) Head-to-head goal point difference; 5) Head-to-head number of plus goal points; 6) Period difference; 7) Number of plus periods; 8) Goal point difference; 9) Number of plus goal points; 10) Draw.

20 June 2023; 13:00	Germany	2–0	Greece	Tarnów Beach Arena 1
20 June 2023; 13:00	(25–24, 28–17); Report			Tarnów Beach Arena 1

20 June 2023; 13:00	Netherlands	2–0	Poland	Tarnów Beach Arena 2
20 June 2023; 13:00	(17–16, 28–12); Report			Tarnów Beach Arena 2

20 June 2023; 20:00	Portugal	0–2	Germany	Tarnów Beach Arena 1
20 June 2023; 20:00	(22–23, 17–32); Report			Tarnów Beach Arena 1

20 June 2023; 20:00	Greece	0–2	Netherlands	Tarnów Beach Arena 2
20 June 2023; 20:00	(22–24, 14–30); Report			Tarnów Beach Arena 2

21 June 2023; 09:00	Germany	2–0	Netherlands	Tarnów Beach Arena 1
21 June 2023; 09:00	(12–19, 22–27); Report			Tarnów Beach Arena 1

21 June 2023; 09:00	Portugal	1–2	Greece	Tarnów Beach Arena 2
21 June 2023; 09:00	(12–23, 15–7, 8–9); Report			Tarnów Beach Arena 2

== Final round ==
=== Bracket ===
Quarter-finals
21 June
Denmark	2
Portugal	0
21 June
Germany	2
Poland	0
21 June
Netherlands	0
Norway	2
21 June
Spain	2
Greece	1

Semifinals
22 June
Denmark	2
Germany	0
22 June
Norway	0
Spain	2

Gold medal game
22 June
Denmark	2
Spain	1
Bronze medal game
22 June
Germany	2
Norway	0

5–8th place semifinals
22 June
Portugal	2
Poland	1
22 June
Netherlands	2
Greece	1

Fifth place game
22 June
Portugal	0
Netherlands	2
Seventh place game
22 June
Poland	0
Greece	2

=== Quarterfinals ===
21 June 2023; 14:00	Denmark	2–0	Portugal	Tarnów Beach Arena 1
21 June 2023; 14:00	(23–14, 25–22); Report			Tarnów Beach Arena 1

21 June 2023; 14:00	Spain	2–1	Greece	Tarnów Beach Arena 2
21 June 2023; 14:00	(19–21, 17–16, 6–2); Report			Tarnów Beach Arena 2

21 June 2023; 15:00	Netherlands	0–2	Norway	Tarnów Beach Arena 2
21 June 2023; 15:00	(21–22, 22–28); Report			Tarnów Beach Arena 2

21 June 2023; 15:00	Germany	2–0	Poland	Tarnów Beach Arena 1
21 June 2023; 15:00	(22–14, 32–16); Report			Tarnów Beach Arena 1

=== 5–8th place semifinals ===
22 June 2023; 12:00	Portugal	2–1	Poland	Tarnów Beach Arena 2
22 June 2023; 12:00	(18–23, 22–21, 18–16); Report			Tarnów Beach Arena 2

22 June 2023; 13:00	Netherlands	2–1	Greece	Tarnów Beach Arena 2
22 June 2023; 13:00	(22–12, 21–26, 8–6); Report			Tarnów Beach Arena 2

=== Semifinals ===
22 June 2023; 12:00	Denmark	2–0	Germany	Tarnów Beach Arena 1
22 June 2023; 12:00	(28–26, 33–32); Report			Tarnów Beach Arena 1

22 June 2023; 13:00	Norway	0–2	Spain	Tarnów Beach Arena 1
22 June 2023; 13:00	(20–23, 22–25); Report			Tarnów Beach Arena 1

=== Seventh place game ===
22 June 2023; 17:30	Poland	0–2	Greece	Tarnów Beach Arena 2
22 June 2023; 17:30	(18–24, 20–21); Report			Tarnów Beach Arena 2

=== Fifth place game ===
22 June 2023; 17:30	Portugal	0–2	Netherlands	Tarnów Beach Arena 1
22 June 2023; 17:30	(12–21, 18–19); Report			Tarnów Beach Arena 1

=== Bronze medal game ===
22 June 2023; 19:30	Germany	2–0	Norway	Tarnów Beach Arena 1
22 June 2023; 19:30	(26–18, 27–26); Report			Tarnów Beach Arena 1

=== Gold medal game ===
22 June 2023; 21:30	Denmark	2–1	Spain	Tarnów Beach Arena 1
22 June 2023; 21:30	(22–20, 20–21, 10–8); Report			Tarnów Beach Arena 1

== Final standings ==
Rank	Team
1st place, gold medalist(s)	Denmark
2nd place, silver medalist(s)	Spain
3rd place, bronze medalist(s)	Germany
4	Norway
5	Netherlands
6	Portugal
7	Greece
8	Poland

== See also ==
- Beach handball at the 2023 European Games – Men's tournament
