= Remei Prat Riera =

Spanish handball and beach handball player (born 1997)

Remei Prat
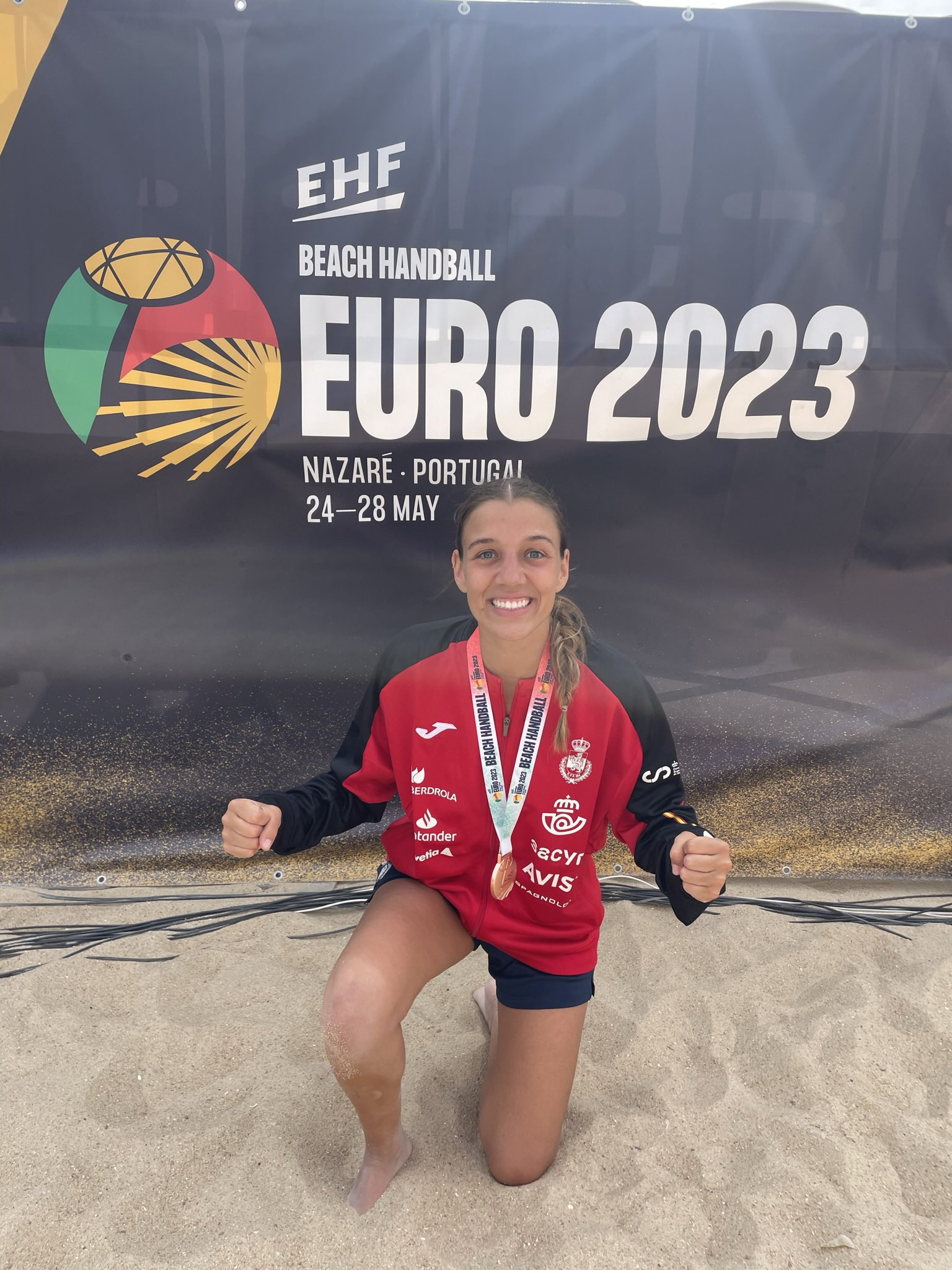
- Prat in 2023

Personal information
- Full name: Remei Prat Riera
- Nationality: Spanish
- Born: July 11, 1997 (age 29) Barcelona, Spain
- Height: 1.75 m (5 ft 9 in)

Sport
- Sport: Handball
- Position: Defensive specialist
National team
| Years | Team | Apps | (Gls) |
| 2022– | Spain | 54 | (12) |
Medal record
European Championship
| Bronze medal – third place | 2023 Portugal |
European Games
| Silver medal – second place | 2023 Poland |
Mediterranean Beach Games
| Gold medal – first place | 2023 Greece |
Beach Handball World Championship
| Silver medal – second place | 2024 Qatar |
- Updated on 25 August 2025

Remei Prat Riera (born 11 July 1997) is a Spanish handball and beach handball player who plays as a defensive specialist. She has represented Spain in international competitions and is a key member of the Spanish beach handball team known as the "Guerreras de Arena" (Sand Warriors).

== Career ==
=== Beach handball ===
Prat achieved her greatest sporting successes in beach handball during the dream season of 2023 for the Guerreras de Arena. That year, she won a European bronze medal, a silver medal at the 2023 European Games in Kraków, and a gold medal at the Mediterranean Beach Games in Heraklion. This outstanding season led to her being nominated for best female athlete at the Fosbury Awards.

In 2024, she competed again with the Spanish national team in the IHF Global Tour, finishing as runners-up, and at the World Championship, where Spain finished in fifth position.

=== Indoor handball ===
Prat was trained in the youth system of OAR Gràcia Sabadell, playing as a wing throughout her indoor career. In the 2015/16 season, she joined KH-7 BM Granollers, making her debut in the División de Honor. However, her time with the Granollers team lasted only that season due to a cruciate ligament injury that sidelined her from November 2015. She returned to OAR in 2017 to complete her recovery.

In 2019, having recovered, she returned to compete with Handbol Sant Quirze in what was then División de Honor Plata, and with the Sant Quirze team, she achieved promotion to División de Honor, marking her second foray into the Spanish top division.

== Club career ==
- 2016–17: KH-7 BM Granollers
- 2017–19: OAR Gràcia Sabadell
- 2019–24: BM Sant Quirze

== Honours ==
| Competition | Year | Result |
|---|---|---|
| European Beach Handball Championship | 2023 | (bronze) Bronze (Nazaré, Portugal) |
| European Games | 2023 | (silver) Silver (Kraków, Poland) |
| Mediterranean Beach Games | 2023 | (gold) Gold (Heraklion, Greece) |
| IHF Global Tour | 2024 | (silver) Silver (Doha, Qatar) |

== International career ==
| Competition | Apps | Goals |
|---|---|---|
| Spain beach handball | 54 | 12 |
