= Canoeing at the 2018 Summer Youth Olympics – Girls' C1 slalom =

Girls' C1 slalom at the III Summer Youth Olympic Games
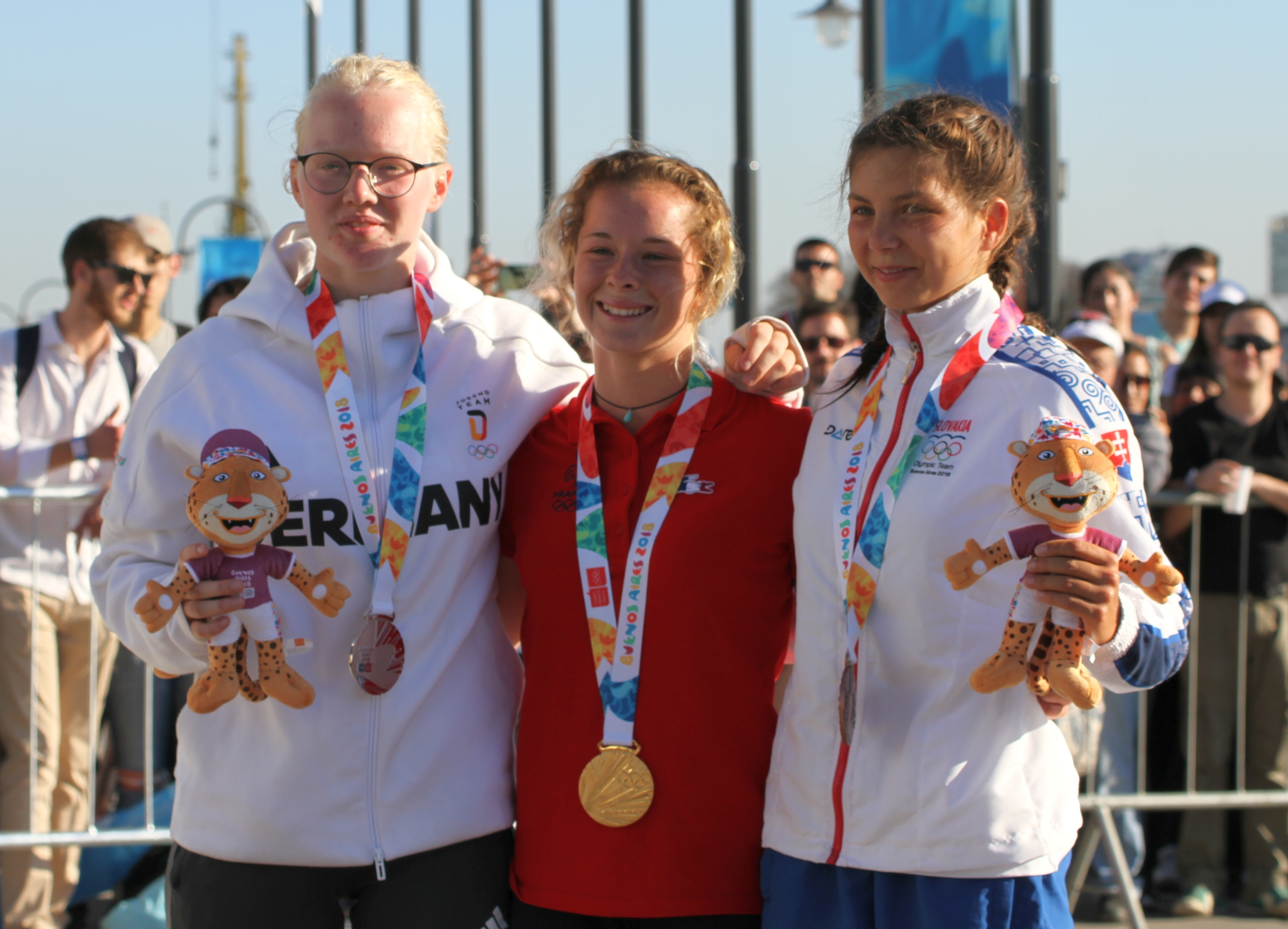
- Girls' C1 slalom Victory ceremony: Lewandowski - Delassus - Luknárová
- Venue: Puerto Madero
- Dates: 16 October
- Competitors: 17 from 16 nations

Medalists
1st place, gold medalist(s)		Doriane Delassus	France
2nd place, silver medalist(s)		Zola Lewandowski	Germany
3rd place, bronze medalist(s)		Emanuela Luknárová	Slovakia

These are the results for the girls' C1 slalom event at the 2018 Summer Youth Olympics.

== Results ==
=== Qualification ===
Rank	Athlete	Nation	Time	Notes
1	Emanuela Luknárová	Slovakia	1:27.51	Q
2	Nirvana Asadbeki	Iran	1:28.57	Q
3	Zola Lewandowski	Germany	1:29.17	Q
4	Doriane Delassus	France	1:30.16	Q
5	Ayomide Emmanuel Bello	Nigeria	1:31.18	Q
6	Elnura Nurlanova	Kazakhstan	1:32.62	Q
7	Kahlia Cullwick	New Zealand	1:34.17	Q
8	Zoe Hein	United States	1:36.98	Q
9	Laura Gönczöl	Hungary	1:38.68	
10	Gulbakhor Fayzieva	Uzbekistan	1:40.86	
11	Blessing Toboh Amusar	Nigeria	1:41.04	
12	Antía Otero	Spain	1:42.02	
13	Amina Palamarchuk	Ukraine	1:44.75	
14	Darya Marusava	Belarus	1:46.69	
15	Isidora Arias	Chile	1:54.32	
16	Stephanie Rodríguez	Mexico	2:11.69	
	Lifa Malapane	Mozambique	DNF	

=== Repechages ===
Rank	Athlete	Nation	Time	Notes
1	Gulbakhor Fayzieva	Uzbekistan	1:34.72	Q
2	Laura Gönczöl	Hungary	1:37.13	Q
3	Amina Palamarchuk	Ukraine	1:43.12	Q
4	Antía Otero	Spain	1:43.25	Q
5	Darya Marusava	Belarus	1:44.44	Q
6	Isidora Arias	Chile	1:59.92	Q
7	Stephanie Rodríguez	Mexico	2:11.69	Q
8	Blessing Toboh Amusar	Nigeria	DNF	Q

=== Last 16 ===
Race	Rank	Athlete	Nation	Time	Notes
1	1	Emanuela Luknárová	Slovakia	1:27.35	Q
1	2	Gulbakhor Fayzieva	Uzbekistan	1:32.68	
2	1	Nirvana Asadbeki	Iran	1:29.00	Q
2	2	Laura Gönczöl	Hungary	1:36.57	
3	1	Zola Lewandowski	Germany	1:28.52	Q
3	2	Amina Palamarchuk	Ukraine	1:53.71	
4	1	Doriane Delassus	France	1:28.49	Q
4	2	Antía Otero	Spain	1:40.67	
5	1	Ayomide Emmanuel Bello	Nigeria	1:35.15	Q
5	2	Darya Marusava	Belarus	DNF	
6	1	Elnura Nurlanova	Kazakhstan	1:34.57	Q
6	2	Isidora Arias	Chile	1:53.09	
7	1	Kahlia Cullwick	New Zealand	1:39.06	Q
7	2	Stephanie Rodríguez	Mexico	2:02.98	
8	1	Zoe Hein	United States	1:35.47	Q
8	2	Blessing Toboh Amusar	Nigeria	DSQ	

=== Quarterfinals ===
Race	Rank	Athlete	Nation	Time	Notes
1	1	Emanuela Luknárová	Slovakia	1:26.30	QFS
1	2	Elnura Nurlanova	Kazakhstan	1:32.67	
2	1	Doriane Delassus	France	1:27.25	QFS
2	2	Ayomide Emmanuel Bello	Nigeria	1:34.03	
3	1	Zola Lewandowski	Germany	1:29.59	QFS
3	2	Zoe Hein	United States	1:40.43	
4	1	Nirvana Asadbeki	Iran	1:29.87	QFS
4	2	Kahlia Cullwick	New Zealand	1:37.84	

=== Semifinals ===
Race	Rank	Athlete	Nation	Time	Notes
1	1	Zola Lewandowski	Germany	1:26.04	QFG
1	2	Emanuela Luknárová	Slovakia	1:26.43	QFB
2	1	Doriane Delassus	France	1:27.54	QFG
2	2	Nirvana Asadbeki	Iran	1:28.53	QFB

=== Finals ===
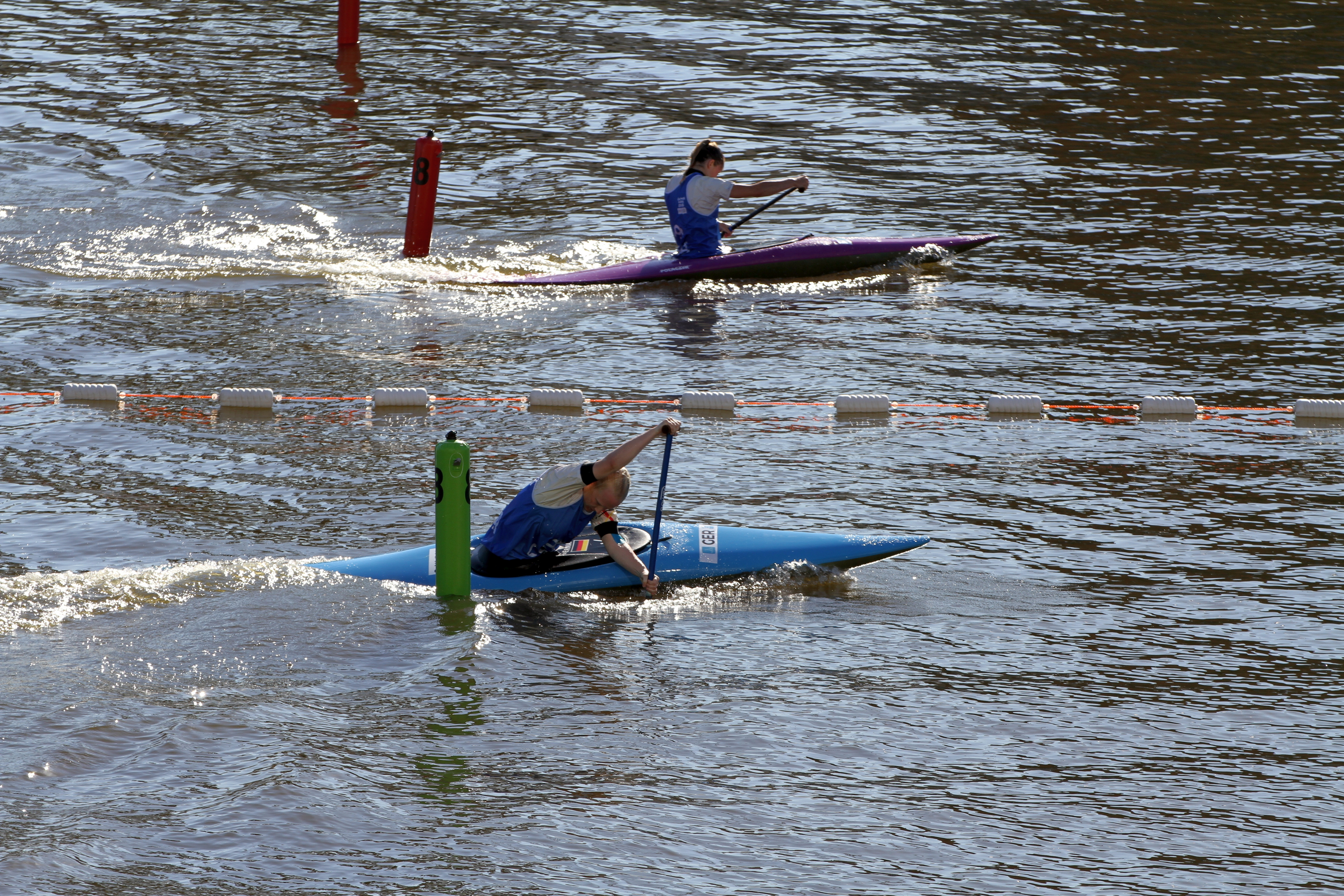
Finale race: Doriane Delassus (above) ahead Zola Lewandowski (blue canoe) short before the finish

Rank	Athlete	Nation	Time	Notes
Gold Medal Race
1st place, gold medalist(s)	Doriane Delassus	France	1:26.08	
2nd place, silver medalist(s)	Zola Lewandowski	Germany	1:26.86	
Bronze Medal Race
3rd place, bronze medalist(s)	Emanuela Luknárová	Slovakia	1:25.75	
4	Nirvana Asadbeki	Iran	1:29.56	
