= Elmira Karapetyan =

Armenian sports shooter (born 1994)

Personal information
- Nationality: Armenian
- Born: 18 May 1994 (age 32) Yerevan, Armenia

Sport
- Sport: Sports shooting
Medal record
Women's shooting
Representing Armenia
World Championships
Silver medal – second place	2026 Doha	50 m pistol
European Games
Silver medal – second place	2023 Kraków–Małopolska	10 m air pistol mixed team

Elmira Karapetyan (born 18 May 1994) is an Armenian sports shooter. She competed in the women's 10 metre air pistol event at the 2020 Summer Olympics.
