= Table tennis at the 2023 European Games – Mixed doubles =

Table tennis – Mixed doubles at the 2023 European Games
- Venue: Hutnik Arena
- Location: Kraków, Poland
- Date: 23–26 June
- Competitors: 32 from 16 nations
- Teams: 16

Medalists
gold medal	Dang Qiu; Nina Mittelham	Germany
silver medal	Nándor Ecseki; Dóra Madarász	Hungary
bronze medal	Ovidiu Ionescu; Bernadette Szőcs	Romania

The mixed doubles table tennis event at the 2023 European Games in Kraków was held at the Hutnik Arena from 23 to 26 June 2023.

== Seeds ==
Seeding was based on the ITTF World Ranking lists published on 20 June 2023.

1. Ovidiu Ionescu / Bernadette Szőcs (ROU) (semifinals, bronze medalist)
2. Álvaro Robles / María Xiao (ESP) (semifinals, fourth place)
3. Ľubomír Pištej / Barbora Balážová (SVK) (quarterfinals)
4. Dang Qiu / Nina Mittelham (GER) (champion, gold medalist)
5. Robert Gardos / Sofia Polcanova (AUT) (quarterfinals)
6. Truls Möregårdh / Christina Källberg (SWE) (round of 16)
7. Nándor Ecseki / Dóra Madarász (HUN) (final, silver medalist)
8. Dimitrije Levajac / Izabela Lupulesku (SRB) (quarterfinals)
9. Samuel Kulczycki / Katarzyna Węgrzyn (POL) (round of 16)
10. John Oyebode / Gaia Monfardini (ITA) (round of 16)
11. İbrahim Gündüz / Sibel Altinkaya (TUR) (quarterfinals)
12. Deni Kožul / Katarina Stražar (SLO) (round of 16)
13. Luka Mladenovic / Ni Xialian (LUX) (round of 16)
14. Anton Limonov / Solomiya Brateyko (UKR) (round of 16)
15. Liam Pitchford / Tin-Tin Ho (GBR) (round of 16)
16. Tomáš Polanský / Hana Matelová (CZE) (round of 16)

== Results ==
Round of 16
1	Ionescu (ROU); Szőcs (ROU)	11	11	5	9	11
12	Kožul (SLO); Stražar (SLO)	7	5	11	11	4
10	Oyebode (ITA); Monfardini (ITA)	6	7	8
5	Gardos (AUT); Polcanova (AUT)	11	11	11
7	Ecseki (HUN); Madarász (HUN)	11	11	7	9	11
9	Kulczycki (POL); Węgrzyn (POL)	5	6	11	11	7
15	Pitchford (GBR); Ho (GBR)	6	11	5	8
3	Pištej (SVK); Balážová (SVK)	11	5	11	11
4	Qiu (GER); Mittelham (GER)	6	11	11	11
13	Mladenovic (LUX); Ni (LUX)	11	4	9	7
11	Gündüz (TUR); Altinkaya (TUR)	11	11	3	8	13
6	Möregårdh (SWE); Källberg (SWE)	7	5	11	11	11
8	Levajac (SRB); Lupulesku (SRB)	11	9	9	11	11
16	Polanský (CZE); Matelová (CZE)	1	11	11	9	2
14	Limonov (UKR); Brateyko (UKR)	11	4	8	3
2	Robles (ESP); Xiao (ESP)	8	11	11	11

Quarterfinals
1	Ionescu (ROU); Szőcs (ROU)	12	11	11	11
5	Gardos (AUT); Polcanova (AUT)	14	7	3	4
7	Ecseki (HUN); Madarász (HUN)	11	11	11
3	Pištej (SVK); Balážová (SVK)	7	5	8
4	Qiu (GER); Mittelham (GER)	9	11	11	11
11	Gündüz (TUR); Altinkaya (TUR)	11	6	3	9
8	Levajac (SRB); Lupulesku (SRB)	11	10	3	11	7
2	Robles (ESP); Xiao (ESP)	6	12	11	9	11

Semifinals
1	Ionescu (ROU); Szőcs (ROU)	9	6	6
7	Ecseki (HUN); Madarász (HUN)	11	11	11
4	Qiu (GER); Mittelham (GER)	11	11	9	11
2	Robles (ESP); Xiao (ESP)	9	4	11	8

Gold medal match
7	Ecseki (HUN); Madarász (HUN)	9	6	11
4	Qiu (GER); Mittelham (GER)	11	11	13
Bronze medal match
1	Ionescu (ROU); Szőcs (ROU)	11	11	9	11
2	Robles (ESP); Xiao (ESP)	6	8	11	9
