= Camilla Degn =

Danish handball player (born 1997)

Personal information
- Full name: Camilla Larsen Degn
- Nationality: Danish
- Born: 19 December 1997 (age 28) Randers, Denmark
- Height: 1.79 m (5 ft 10 in)

Sport
- Sport: Handball
- Position: Left wing
- Current club: Viborg HK
- Number: 14

Youth career
- Years: Team
- 2014-2016: Randers HK

Senior clubs
- Years: Team
- 2016-2023: Randers HK
- 2023-: Viborg HK
Medal record
Women's beach handball
Representing Denmark
European Games
Gold medal – first place	2023 Kraków–Małopolska

Camilla Larsen Degn (born 19 December 1997) is a Danish handball player and beach handball player who currently plays for Viborg HK.

She signed for Viborg HK from her childhood club, Randers HK in 2023 when her former club declared bankruptcy. At Viborg Hk she was reunited with her former coach Ole Bitsch.

At Randers HK she was the team captain.

In addition to ordinary handball, Degn is also on the Danish National Team in Beach handball. In 2023 she was on the team that won the 2023 European Games.

While playing handball she took a degree in nutrition in 2023.
