= Kickboxing at the 2023 European Games =

Kickboxing competition

- Venue: Myślenice Arena
- Location: Myślenice, Poland
- Dates: 28 June - 3 July
- Competitors: 128 from 25 nations

Kickboxing competitions at the 2023 European Games were held from 28 June to 3 July 2023 at the Myślenice Arena, Myślenice. Sixteen events were contested across three forms; full contact, light contact and point fighting. This is the first appearance of kickboxing in the European Games.

== Medal table ==
* Host nation (Poland)

Rank	Nation	Gold	Silver	Bronze	Total
1	Italy	6	2	2	10
2	Germany	2	2	3	7
3	Slovenia	1	3	0	4
4	Hungary	1	2	5	8
5	Ireland	1	2	2	5
6	Poland*	1	0	4	5
7	Turkey	1	0	3	4
8	Georgia	1	0	1	2
8	Serbia	1	0	1	2
10	Azerbaijan	1	0	0	1
11	Bulgaria	0	1	2	3
11	Norway	0	1	2	3
13	Greece	0	1	1	2
13	Spain	0	1	1	2
13	Ukraine	0	1	1	2
16	Switzerland	0	0	2	2
17	Croatia	0	0	1	1
17	Finland	0	0	1	1
Totals (18 entries)		16	16	32	64

== Medal summary ==
=== Men ===
Event	Gold	Silver	Bronze
Pointfighting
−63 kg	Gabriele Lanzilao; Italy	Georgios Tsampodimos; Greece	Roland Viczian; Germany
−63 kg	Gabriele Lanzilao; Italy	Georgios Tsampodimos; Greece	Richárd Veres; Hungary
−74 kg	Martin Bálint; Hungary	Nathan Tait; Ireland	Danylo Mancari; Switzerland
−74 kg	Martin Bálint; Hungary	Nathan Tait; Ireland	Edoardo Bagarello; Italy
−84 kg	Sandro Peters; Germany	Conor Johnson; Ireland	Cevat Kır; Turkey
−84 kg	Sandro Peters; Germany	Conor Johnson; Ireland	Riccardo Albanese; Italy
Full contact
−63.5 kg	Farid Aghamoghlanov; Azerbaijan	Damiano Tramontana; Italy	Oskar Sobański; Poland
−63.5 kg	Farid Aghamoghlanov; Azerbaijan	Damiano Tramontana; Italy	Milton Barrios Galarreta; Norway
−75 kg	Luka Shoniya; Georgia	Tymur Brykov; Ukraine	Jakub Pokusa; Poland
−75 kg	Luka Shoniya; Georgia	Tymur Brykov; Ukraine	Aleksandar Konovalov; Serbia
−86 kg	Robert Krasoń; Poland	Mohammed Hamdi; Spain	Artem Melnyk; Ukraine
−86 kg	Robert Krasoń; Poland	Mohammed Hamdi; Spain	Zurab Ivaniadze; Georgia
Light contact
−63 kg	Ivan Penzo; Italy	Anis Triqui; Germany	Rubén Iglesias; Spain
−63 kg	Ivan Penzo; Italy	Anis Triqui; Germany	Gergő Száraz; Hungary
−79 kg	Al Amin Rmadan; Germany	Lajos Fésű; Hungary	Ivan Krastanov; Bulgaria
−79 kg	Al Amin Rmadan; Germany	Lajos Fésű; Hungary	Recep Men; Turkey

=== Women ===
Event	Gold	Silver	Bronze
Pointfighting
−50 kg	Federica Trovalusci; Italy	Tyra Barada; Slovenia	Szonja Török; Hungary
−50 kg	Federica Trovalusci; Italy	Tyra Barada; Slovenia	Maëline Lachaud; Switzerland
−60 kg	Francesca Ceci; Italy	Andrea Busa; Hungary	Funda Güleç; Turkey
−60 kg	Francesca Ceci; Italy	Andrea Busa; Hungary	Kiara Mager; Germany
−70 kg	Domenica Angelino; Italy	Tina Baloh; Slovenia	Jodie Browne; Ireland
−70 kg	Domenica Angelino; Italy	Tina Baloh; Slovenia	Anna Kondár; Hungary
Full contact
−52 kg	Emine Arslan; Turkey	Nicole Perona; Italy	Aleksandra Dimitrova; Bulgaria
−52 kg	Emine Arslan; Turkey	Nicole Perona; Italy	Charlotte Berg Andersen; Norway
−60 kg	Amy Wall; Ireland	Mariell Straume; Norway	Cintia Czégény; Hungary
−60 kg	Amy Wall; Ireland	Mariell Straume; Norway	Kinga Szlachcic; Poland
−70 kg	Aleksandra Krstić; Serbia	Aline Sodjinou; Germany	Karolina Juja; Poland
−70 kg	Aleksandra Krstić; Serbia	Aline Sodjinou; Germany	Antonija Zec; Croatia
Light contact
−50 kg	Tyra Barada; Slovenia	Kristina Nikolova; Bulgaria	Zarmakoupi Paraskevi-Semeli; Greece
−50 kg	Tyra Barada; Slovenia	Kristina Nikolova; Bulgaria	Michelle Mesmer; Germany
−60 kg	Luna Mendy; Italy	Urška Gazvoda; Slovenia	Nicole Bannon; Ireland
−60 kg	Luna Mendy; Italy	Urška Gazvoda; Slovenia	Mira Sjövall; Finland

== Qualification ==
Qualification for the kickboxing tournament is governed by the results from the 2022 European Amateur Kickboxing Championships; the top eight athletes in each European Games class wins a single quota space for their NOC.

NOC	Men								Women								Total
NOC	Point Fighting			Full Contact			Light Contact		Point Fighting			Full Contact			Light Contact		Total
NOC	-63	-74	-84	-63.5	-75	-86	-63	-79	-50	-60	-70	-52	-60	-70	-50	-60	Total
Austria	x	x	x						x	x							5
Azerbaijan				x													1
Bulgaria								x	x			x			x		4
Croatia											x			x			2
Czech Republic												x					1
Finland			x	x	x					x						x	5
France						x											1
Germany	x		x				x	x	x	x	x			x	x		9
Great Britain	x	x	x	x					x	x			x				7
Greece	x		x											x	x	x	5
Georgia				x	x	x											3
Hungary	x						x	x	x	x	x		x			x	8
Ireland	x	x	x	x	x			x		x	x		x			x	10
Italy	x	x	x	x	x	x	x	x	x	x	x	x	x	x	x	x	16
Netherlands		x											x			x	3
Norway		x		x								x	x	x			5
Poland				x	x	x	x	x					x		x	x	8
Portugal					x									x			2
Serbia					x							x		x			3
Slovakia						x				x					x		3
Slovenia		x					x		x		x				x	x	6
Spain						x	x					x					3
Switzerland	x	x					x										3
Turkey	x		x			x	x	x	x	x	x	x	x	x	x		12
Ukraine					x	x		x				x					4
Total: NOCs	8	8	8	8	8	8	8	8	8	8	8	8	8	8	8	8	128
