= Patricia Coco =

Spanish canoeist

Personal information
- Nationality: Spanish
- Born: 12 February 1991 (age 35)

Sport
- Country: Spain
- Sport: Canoe sprint
Medal record
World Championships
Gold medal – first place	2021 Copenhagen	C-2 200 m

Patricia Coco (born 12 February 1991) is a Spanish sprint canoeist.

She competed at the 2021 ICF Canoe Sprint World Championships, winning a gold medal in the C-2 200 m distance.
