= Taekwondo at the 2023 European Games – Men's 68 kg =

Taekwondo competition

Men's 68 kg at the 2023 European Games
- Venue: Krynica-Zdrój Arena
- Date: 24 June
- Competitors: 16 from 16 nations

Medalists
gold medal	Javier Pérez	Spain
silver medal	Bradly Sinden	Great Britain
bronze medal	Otto Jørgensen	Denmark
bronze medal	Konstantinos Chamalidis	Greece

The men's 68 kg competition in taekwondo at the 2023 European Games took place on 24 June at the Krynica-Zdrój Arena.

== Schedule ==
All times are Central European Summer Time (UTC+2).

Date	Time	Event
Saturday, 24 June 2023	09:12	Round of 16
Saturday, 24 June 2023	14:12	Quarterfinals
Saturday, 24 June 2023	15:48	Semifinals
Saturday, 24 June 2023	16:36	Repechage
Saturday, 24 June 2023	19:12	Bronze medal bouts
Saturday, 24 June 2023	20:36	Final

== Results ==
Round of 16
Bradly Sinden (GBR)	18	17
Andrii Chumachenko (UKR)	8	6
Otto Jørgensen (DEN)	9	10
Levente Józsa (HUN)	7	6
Leon Glasnović (CRO)	0	14	9
Ferhat Can Kavurat (TUR)	2	7	7
Mitko Dzhordzhev (BUL)	5	12	6
Mateusz Szczęsnowski (POL)	7	3	6
Ali Alian (SWE)	7	9	3
Zinedin Bećović (MNE)	6	9	7
Théo Lucien (FRA)	12	7
Nimrod Krivishkiy (ISR)	0	7
Konstantinos Chamalidis (GRE)	8	4	6
Javad Aghayev (AZE)	7	5	3
Warrick Galland (SUI)	4	0
Javier Perez (ESP)	7	13

Quarterfinals
Bradly Sinden (GBR)	11	11
Otto Jørgensen (DEN)	9	10
Leon Glasnović (CRO)	10	13	9
Mitko Dzhordzhev (BUL)	10	0	6
Zinedin Bećović (MNE)	6	8
Théo Lucien (FRA)	9^{P}	6^{RSC}
Konstantinos Chamalidis (GRE)	4	3
Javier Perez (ESP)	7	4

Semifinals
Bradly Sinden (GBR)	5	12	12
Leon Glasnović (CRO)	6	0	8
Théo Lucien (FRA)	0	4
Javier Perez (ESP)	4	6

Final
Bradly Sinden (GBR)	WD
Javier Perez (ESP)

=== Repechage ===
Repechage
Otto Jørgensen (DEN)	16	16
Andrii Chumachenko (UKR)	2	4
Warrick Galland (SUI)	6	11	1
Konstantinos Chamalidis (GRE)	7	9	5

Bronze medal bout
Théo Lucien (FRA)	6	0	5
Otto Jørgensen (DEN)	4	1	9
Konstantinos Chamalidis (GRE)	8	11	12
Leon Glasnović (CRO)	4	13	1
