= Yuliia Kolesnyk =

Ukrainian sprint canoeist

Personal information
- Nationality: Ukrainian
- Born: 27 August 1997 (age 28)

Sport
- Country: Ukraine
- Sport: Canoe sprint
Medal record
World Championships
Bronze medal – third place	2021 Copenhagen	C-4 500 m

Yuliia Kolesnyk (born 27 August 1997) is a Ukrainian sprint canoeist.

She competed at the 2021 ICF Canoe Sprint World Championships, winning a bronze medal in the C-4 500 m distance.
