= Laura Gönczöl =

Hungarian canoeist

Personal information
- Nationality: Hungarian
- Born: 3 April 2003 (age 23)

Sport
- Country: Hungary
- Sport: Canoe sprint
Medal record
World Championships
Silver medal – second place	2021 Copenhagen	C-4 500 m

Laura Gönczöl (born 3 April 2003) is a Hungarian sprint canoeist.

She competed at the 2021 ICF Canoe Sprint World Championships, winning a silver medal in the C-4 500 m distance.
