= Szonja Török =

Hungarian model and kickboxer

Personal information
- Native name: Török Szonja
- Citizenship: (Hungary) Hungarian
- Born: Szonja Hajnalka Török; April 6, 1998 (age 28) Budapest, Hungary
- Education: Pogány Frigyes Technikum
- Occupations: Model; Kickboxer
- Height: 1.60 m (5 ft 3 in)
- Parents: Gyula Török (father); Hajnalka Fehér (mother)
- Relative: Gyula Török (grandfather)

Sport
- Partner: Dóra Tímea Kozári (2025–present)
Medal record
Women's Kickboxing
Representing Hungary
European Games
Bronze medal – third place	2023 Kraków-Małopolska	P.F. 50 kg

Szonja Hajnalka Török (born April 6, 1998) is a Hungarian kickboxing world champion, model, and the granddaughter of Gyula Török, an Olympic champion Hungarian boxer. She is known for her success in both national and international competitions, having represented Hungary in various kickboxing events and won numerous medals throughout her career.

== Early life and education ==
Török began her kickboxing training in 2013 at the Budapest Complex SZC Pogány Frigyes Technikum, where she also completed her secondary education. During her time in school, she actively competed in kickboxing and quickly established herself as a promising athlete in the sport.
