= Aliaksandra Kalaur =

Belarusian canoeist

Personal information
- Nationality: Belarusian
- Born: 11 June 2001 (age 25)

Sport
- Country: Belarus
- Sport: Canoe sprint
Medal record
World Championships
Gold medal – first place	2021 Copenhagen	C-4 500 m

Aliaksandra Kalaur (born 11 June 2001) is a Belarusian sprint canoeist.

She competed at the 2021 ICF Canoe Sprint World Championships, winning a gold medal in the C-4 500 m distance.
