= Giada Bragato =

Hungarian canoeist (born 1999)

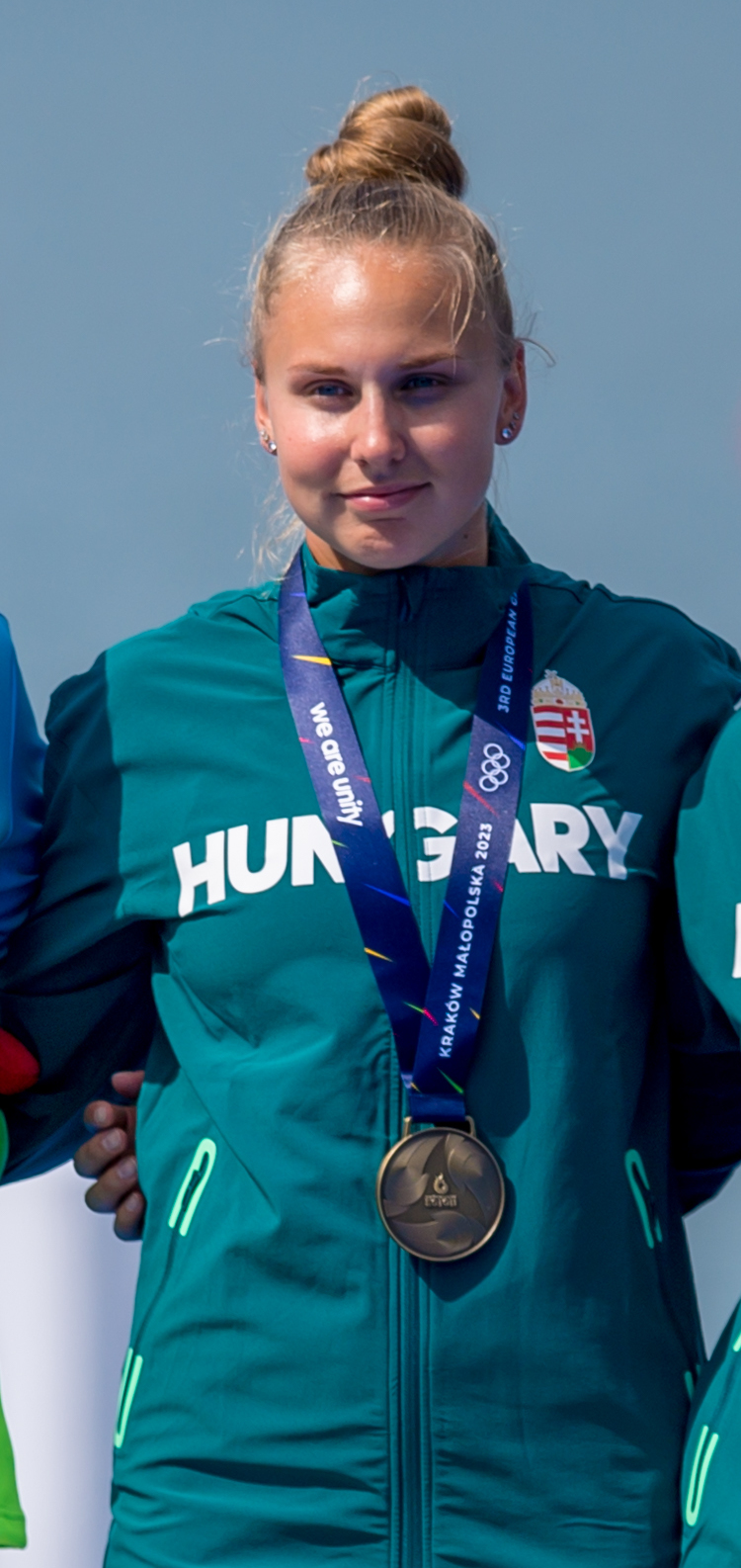

Personal information
- Nationality: Hungarian
- Born: 14 July 1999 (age 26)

Sport
- Country: Hungary
- Sport: Canoe sprint
Medal record
Women's canoe sprint
World Championships
Silver medal – second place	2024 Samarkand	C-1 1000 m
Bronze medal – third place	2021 Copenhagen	C-2 200 m
Bronze medal – third place	2022 Dartmouth	C-2 200 m
Bronze medal – third place	2022 Dartmouth	C-2 500 m
Bronze medal – third place	2022 Dartmouth	C-4 500 m
European Games
Bronze medal – third place	2023 Kraków-Małopolska	C-2 500 m
European Championships
Gold medal – first place	2022 Munich	C-2 200 m
Silver medal – second place	2022 Munich	C-2 500 m
Silver medal – second place	2024 Szeged	C-1 500 m
Women's canoe marathon
World Championships
Gold medal – first place	2025 Győr	C-1

Giada Bragato (born 14 July 1999) is a Hungarian sprint canoeist.

== Career ==
She competed at the 2021 ICF Canoe Sprint World Championships, winning a bronze medal in the C-2 200 m distance. She competed at the 2022 ICF Canoe Sprint World Championships and won three bronze medals.

Bragato was born to a Hungarian mother and an Italian father.

== Major results ==
=== World championships ===
Year	C-1 500	C-1 1000	C-1 5000	C-2 200	C-2 500	C-4 500	XC-4 500
2019	5	—N/a				—N/a	—N/a
2021		—N/a		3rd place, bronze medalist(s)			—N/a
2022				3rd place, bronze medalist(s)	3rd place, bronze medalist(s)	3rd place, bronze medalist(s)	—N/a
2023					5	4	—N/a
2024	9	2nd place, silver medalist(s)	9		—N/a	—N/a	5
