= Laura Ruiz Pérez =

Spanish road cyclist (born 2004)

Laura Ruiz
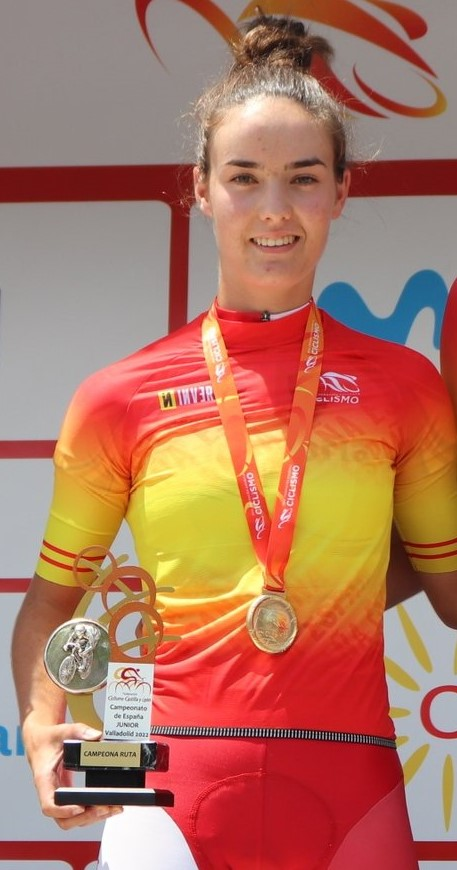

Personal information
- Full name: Laura Ruiz Pérez
- Born: June 18, 2004 (age 22) Colindres, Cantabria, Spain

Cycling career
- Sport: Cycling
- Current team: Movistar Team
- Discipline: Road
- Role: Rider

Professional teams
- 2023: Eneicat–CMTeam–Seguros Deportivos
- 2024–: Movistar Team

Major wins
- National Junior Road Race Championships (2022)

Laura Ruiz Pérez (born 18 June 2004) is a Spanish road cyclist who has competed for the UCI Women's Team Movistar Team since 2024. She won the Spanish national junior road race title in 2022 and is the twin sister of fellow Movistar rider Lucía Ruiz Pérez.

== Early life and junior career ==
Ruiz and her twin sister Lucía were born in Colindres, Cantabria. Both took up cycling at the age of five and combine their sporting careers with veterinary studies at the University of León. As a junior, Ruiz competed for the Cantabrian team Río Miera–Meruelo–Cantabria Deporte.

On 3 July 2022, Ruiz won the Spanish junior road race title in Valladolid in a sprint finish ahead of Almudena Morales and Lucía García; her sister Lucía finished fourth and the Cantabrian regional team also took the team classification. Later that month, she won the overall classification at the junior women's Vuelta a Pamplona. She was later selected for the Spanish team at the 2022 UCI Junior Road World Championships in Wollongong, Australia.

== Professional career ==
=== Eneicat–CMTeam (2023) ===
Ruiz turned professional in 2023 with the UCI Women's Continental Team Eneicat–CMTeam–Seguros Deportivos, where she rode alongside her sister and made her first UCI Women's World Tour appearances at the Vuelta a Burgos Femenina and La Vuelta Femenina.

=== Movistar Team (2024–present) ===
In August 2023, Movistar Team announced the signing of both Ruiz sisters on three-year contracts running through to the end of 2026. Ruiz was presented as part of the team's 14-rider squad for 2024 at its December launch. She made her WorldTour debut for Movistar at the 2024 UAE Tour Women, finishing seventh in the opening stage in Madinat Zayed.

In September 2024, she finished eighth in the women's under-23 road race at the European Road Championships in Limburg, with her sister taking sixth place. The following year, riding the Tour de l'Avenir Femmes with the Spanish national team, she finished 11th on the second stage.
