= Renáta Tobai-Sike =

Hungarian sport shooter

Personal information
- Nationality: Hungarian
- Born: 10 July 1978 (age 47)
- Height: 1.80 m (5 ft 11 in)
- Weight: 67 kg (148 lb)

Sport
- Country: Hungary
- Sport: Shooting
Medal record
World Championships
| Silver medal – second place | 2025 Cairo | 25 meter standard pistol team |
| Bronze medal – third place | 2014 Granada | 25 m center fire pistol |
| Bronze medal – third place | 2014 Granada | 10 m air pistol team |
European Championships
| Silver medal – second place | 2012 Vierumäki | 10 m pistol team |
| Bronze medal – third place | 2015 Arnhem | 10 m pistol |
| Bronze medal – third place | 2021 Osijek | 25 m pistol team |
| Bronze medal – third place | 2022 Wrocław | 25 m pistol |

Renáta Tobai-Sike (born 10 July 1978) is a Hungarian shooter. She represented her country at the 2016 Summer Olympics.
