= Beach handball at the 2023 European Games =

- Venue: Tarnów Beach Arena
- Location: Tarnów, Poland
- Dates: 20–22 June
- Nations: 10
- Teams: 16

The Beach handball tournament at the 2023 European Games was held in Tarnów, Poland from 20 to 22 June 2023. This was the first time beach handball was on the European Games program. (In the previous two editions, held in Baku and Minsk, the beach version of handball was absent). The Games were attended by 192 players – 16 teams, 8 of each sex, from 10 countries and the competitions were held for three days from June 20 at the Beach Sports Center in Tarnow. The competition ended with the awarding of medals to the athletes – medals were provided for the top three male and female teams. The stands of the arena during the games accommodated 2,100 spectators. Beach soccer specialists also competed at this facility.

The beach handball tournament was played in a specially prepared stadium.

== Qualification ==
Means of qualification	Date of competition	Venue	Berths	Men	Women
Host country	—		1	Poland	Poland
EHF Beach Handball EURO 2023	24–28 May 2023	(Portugal) Nazaré	7	Croatia; Denmark; Germany; Hungary; Norway; Portugal; Spain	Denmark; Germany; Greece; Netherlands; Norway; Portugal; Spain
Total			8		

== Medal summary ==
=== Medalists ===
Event	Gold	Silver	Bronze
Men	Spain; Alberto Castro; José Antonio Consuegra; Carlos Donderis; Ramón Fuentes; Adrián Hidalgo; Pablo Martín; Darío A. Mata; Domingo J. L. Mosquera; Adriá Ortolá; Elhji Touré; Joaquín Varo; Sergio J. Venegas	Hungary; Ádám Balogh; Balázs Csuka; Norbert Gyene; Péter Hajdú; András John; László Kovácsovics; Attila Kun; László Nahaj; Csanád Neukum; Bence Rozmán; Patrik Vizes; Bence Zakics	Denmark; Martin Andersen; Frederik Bech; Anders N. Hansen; Andreas Hoegh; Dines Kjeldgaard; William Lærke; Christian Nielsen; Mikkel D. Nielsen; Laurids Ulrichsel; Jeppe Villumsen
Women	Denmark; Camilla Degn; Rikke Enevoldsen; Johanne Graugaard; Sandra Hansen; Line Kristensen; Line Larsen; Cecillie Lindgaard; Josefine Mahler; Ann Cecilie Møller; Johanne Uhrhammer; Ida Winding	Spain; Mónica Cámara; Alba Díaz; Malena Díaz; Patricia Encinas; Virginia Fernández; Violeta González; Jimena Laguna; Inoa Lucio; Barbara Piñeira; Remei Prat; Gemma P. Sánchez; Mireia Torras	Germany; Joelle Arno; Julia Drachsler; Jana Epple; Belen Gettwart; Carolin Hübner; Isabel Kattner; Kristina Krecken; Nele Kurzke; Paula Reips; Michelle Schäfer; Ryleene Teodoro; Janne Woch

=== Medal table ===
Rank	NOC	Gold	Silver	Bronze	Total
1	Spain	1	1	0	2
2	Denmark	1	0	1	2
3	Hungary	0	1	0	1
4	Germany	0	0	1	1
Totals (4 entries)		2	2	2	6
