= 2025 in England =

- Centuries: 19th; 20th; 21st
- Decades: 2000s; 2010s; 2020s
- See also: 2024–25 in English football 2025–26 in English football 2025 in the United Kingdom; Other events of 2025

Events of the year 2025 in England.

== Incumbent ==
- Monarch - Charles III
- Prime Minister - Keir Starmer

== Events ==
=== January ===
- 1 January –
  - Two teenagers are killed and seven other people injured in a collision involving two cars in East Yorkshire.
  - The cap on bus fares in England rises from £2 to £3 per journey.
  - West Midlands Police announce they have located Sheila Fox, missing from Coventry since 1972, and say she is safe and living in another part of the country.
- 2 January –
  - Twenty Labour Party councillors on Broxtowe Borough Council in Nottinghamshire have resigned from Labour in protest at the direction of the party under Sir Keir Starmer and will sit as independents.
  - Graham Sheldon resigns as leader of Oldham Council's Conservatives, and from the Conservative Party itself, after police were called to a heated council meeting on 18 December.
  - Rapper Stormzy is given a nine-month driving ban by Wimbledon Magistrates' Court after he was caught using a mobile phone while driving in March 2024.
  - A baby boy is killed when a car hits a tree after leaving the A1 dual carriageway near Grantham, Lincolnshire.
  - A man dies in a 230 ft fall from Sharp Edge on Blencathra, in the Lake District.
- 3 January – Data from NHS England shows the number of people being treated in hospital for flu in the week ending 29 December was 5,000, a fourfold increase from November, and was continuing to rise "at a very concerning rate".
- 4 January –
  - The NHS in Cornwall declares critical incident.
  - A fire destroys a historic building housing the Dorset Burger Company in Weymouth, Dorset.
- 6 January –
  - Prime Minister Sir Keir Starmer outlines plans to reduce hospital waiting lists in England, including setting up more community hubs and greater utilisation of the private sector.
  - Former prison officer Linda De Sousa is sentenced to fifteen months in prison for having sex with an inmate at Wandsworth Prison.
- 7 January –
  - Police launch a murder investigation after a 14-year-old boy, subsequently named as Kelyan Bokassa, is stabbed to death on a double-decker bus in Woolwich, south east London.
  - The Crafter's Companion store, a business owned by Dragons' Den panellist Sara Davies, in Barlborough, near Chesterfield, is closed by administrators, leaving 10 people redundant. A second store in Evesham, Worcestershire base, remains open, along with the company's head office in County Durham. Davies was a previous shareholder in the business, but reacquired it from the administrators.
- 10 January – Ten Reform UK councillors in Derbyshire resign from the party in protest at Nigel Farage's leadership, claiming the Reform is being run in an "increasingly autocratic manner" and "has lost its sense of direction" since Farage took over as leader. In response, Farage says the members were put forward by a "rogue branch" of the party and that "none of them passed vetting".
- 11 January – An off-duty police officer, subsequently named as PC Rosie Prior, is killed when she is struck by a lorry on the A19 at Bagby in North Yorkshire after stopping to help at the scene of an earlier crash. Ryan Welford, a driver who was involved in the first crash, is also killed in the incident, while a passenger is taken to hospital for treatment.
- 12 January – A man is arrested for attempted murder after a female member of staff, reported to be a nurse, was stabbed in the A&E department of the Royal Oldham Hospital and suffered lifechanging injuries.
- 13 January –
  - A man is charged with the attempted murder of a nurse who was stabbed at the Royal Oldham Hospital on 11 January.
  - Ryan Wellings, who became the first defendant to stand trial for the unlawful killing of his partner after she committed suicide following prolonged domestic abuse, is cleared of her manslaughter, but found guilty of assault and prolonged domestic violence. He is subsequently sentenced to six and a half years in custody.
  - Two women are arrested after climate change protestors spray paint the grave of Charles Darwin in Westminster Abbey.
  - At Birmingham Crown Court, five men who used dating app Grindr to target and rob a series of men are given prison sentences of between 12 and 17 years.
- 14 January –
  - The NHS is to extend bowel cancer screening in the form of home test kits to everyone over the age of 50 in England, bringing England in line with Scotland and Wales.
  - MPs vote to back a one-month cap on advanced rents in England as part of the Renters' Rights Bill.
- 16 January –
  - Convicted murderer Jake Fahri, sentenced to life imprisonment for the 2008 murder of schoolboy Jimmy Mizen and released on parole in 2023, is recalled to prison after "shamelessly boasting" about his crime, the Probation Service says.
  - Hassan Sentamu is found guilty of the September 2023 murder of Elianne Andam in Croydon.
  - Police in Greater Manchester seize a Tesla Cybertruck, a vehicle which is illegal to drive in the UK because of safety concerns.
- 17 January – White supremacist Callum Parslow, who stabbed an asylum seeker at a hotel near Worcester in what a judge described as "undoubtedly a terrorist attack", is sentenced to life imprisonment with a minimum of 22 and eight months after being convicted of attempted murder.
- 18 January – A further three people are charged with the murder of Michelle Sadio, who was shot dead outside a church in Harlesden, north west London, on the night of 14 December.
- 21 January –
  - Three men who stabbed motorist Sadiq Al-lami to death in a road rage attack in Didsbury, Greater Manchester in January 2024, are sentenced to life imprisonment.
  - A murder investigation is launched following the fatal stabbing of a 12-year-old boy, subsequently named as Leo Ross, in the Hall Green area of Birmingham.
- 22 January – Kyle Clifford pleads guilty to the murders of Carol, Hannah and Louise Hunt in Bushey, Hertfordshire, on 9 July 2024.
- 24 January – Deveca Rose, whose four children died in a house fire after she left them alone in December 2021, is sentenced to ten years in prison for manslaughter.
- 25 January –
  - West Midlands Police confirm that a 14-year-old boy has been charged with the murder of Leo Ross in Birmingham.
  - West Yorkshire Police confirm that three teenagers were killed in a crash near Wakefield the previous evening when a car left the road and hit a tree.
  - A police officer is injured after he is struck by a vehicle in Greater Manchester; a suspect is subsequently arrested on suspicion of attempted murder.
- 26 January – Police are investigating the vandalism of two memorials to police officers who died in the line of duty in West Yorkshire, which happened on subsequent days.
- 28 January – An inquest into the 2018 Leicester helicopter crash in which five people were killed rules the crash was an accident.
- 30 January – During a hearing at the Old Bailey, Steve Sansom and Gemma Watts plead guilty to the murder of Sarah Mayhew, whose dismembered remains were discovered in locations around London in 2023; both are sentenced to life imprisonment, with Sansom, who was on licence for committing a previous murder, given a whole life sentence.
- 31 January – UK drill rapper Digga D is sentenced to three years and eleven months in prison for supplying 99 lbs of cannabis.

=== February ===
- 1 February – Four people are killed when the vehicle they are travelling in crashes into a building in Colchester, Essex.
- 3 February – New Ofsted report cards are launched for assessing schools, with government intervention for struggling schools to take place much sooner than under the previous system.
- 4 February – Robert Jenner is sentenced to 30 years in prison for attempting to kill a police officer by stabbing him in the head with a pair of scissors at a flat in Maidstone, Kent, in 2023.
- 6 February – Two couples tell the BBC that they went through with aborting healthy babies after doctors at Nottingham University Hospitals NHS Trust told them the unborn children had serious genetic problems.
- 9 February – A BBC News investigation discovers that Drax Power Station in North Yorkshire failed more than once to disclose the burning of wood from primary forests.
- 10 February –
  - Simon Vickers is sentenced to life imprisonment with a minimum of 15 years for the July 2024 murder of his 14-year-old daughter Scarlett Vickers, after a jury rejects his claim that he stabbed her with a kitchen knife during a play fight and that her death was "a freak accident".
  - The UK government agrees a new funding deal with Drax Power Station that will reduce the amount of subsidies it receives by half.
- 11 February – James Garnor resigns as a member of Whittlebury Parish Council after a video was shared that appeared to show an explosive device being triggered by a cat.
- 12 February –
  - The UK government unveils a £300m project to build more affordable housing in England. Part of the plans will also curb the amount of housing benefit rogue landlords receive if their properties are substandard.
  - Nottingham University Hospitals NHS Trust is fined £1.6m for failings connected to the deaths of three babies under its care.
- 13 February –
  - The Parole Board confirms that Michael Steele, one of two men convicted over the 1995 Rettendon murders and sentenced to life imprisonment in 1998, will be released from prison on licence.
  - David Newton is convicted of the 2013 murder of retired postmistress Una Crown, who was stabbed to death at her home in Wisbech, Cambridgeshire. Originally a suspect at the time of the murder, he was re-arrested in April 2024 following advances in DNA technology.
  - The UK government publishes a list of 100 proposed locations for potential new towns in England, with Housing Minister Matthew Pennycook saying work on them will begin before the next general election.
- 14 February –
  - David Newton is sentenced to life imprisonment with a minimum term of 21 years for the 2013 murder of Una Crown.
  - Around 100 people are rescued after fire breaks out at the five-storey Chiltern Firehouse hotel in Marylebone, Central London.
  - Kent Police launch a murder investigation after a woman, who is subsequently named as 43-year-old Lisa Smith from Slough, is shot dead outside the Three Horseshoes pub on Main Road, Knockholt.
  - Lottery winners Patrick and Frances Connolly, from Hartlepool, have acquired a 25% stake in Championship side Durham Women FC with the aim of reaching the Women's Super League.
- 15 February –
  - BBC News reports that the convictions of Jack Whomes and Michael Steele for the Rettendon murders are being reviewed by the Criminal Cases Review Commission following an application.
  - Netflix are forced to move their BAFTA Awards afterparty, scheduled to be held at the Chiltern Firehouse the following day, to a different venue after a fire at the hotel.
- 16 February – A man is charged with the murder of Julie Buckley, a woman from Christchurch near March in Cambridge, who disappeared in January. Charges have been brought even though a body has not been found.
- 17 February –
  - Prime Minister Keir Starmer says the UK government met a key election target to provide an extra two million GP appointments, with the target being met between July and November 2024.
  - Logan Burnett is sentenced to life imprisonment with a minimum of 23 years and 173 days for the murder of his partner, Courtney Mitchell, who was stabbed to death in front of her friends in Ipswich on 6 August 2024.
- 18 February – Jack Bennett is sentenced to 28 weeks in prison by Exeter Magistrates after pleading guilty to sending malicious communications to MP Jess Phillips, Mayor of London Sadiq Khan and a Metropolitan police officer between February 2024 and January 2025. He is also given a restraining order preventing him from contacting his victims for five years.
- 19 February – County Durham Police begin a search for keen long-distance runner Jenny Hall, 23, who was last seen the previous afternoon. Her car is discovered parked on the B6278 on remote moorland.
- 20 February – Kent Police announce that they believe a man who they suspect of shooting his wife dead on Valentine's Day is dead. Edward Stockings is said to have entered the River Thames after shooting dead Lisa Smith outside a pub.
- 21 February – Former Bedfordshire police officer Natasha Conneely, who removed a burglar's electronic tag so they could have a sexual relationship, is sentenced to 18 months in prison after pleading guilty to corruption or other improper exercise of police powers and privileges.
- 22 February –
  - 2025 Six Nations Championship: England regain the Calcutta Cup for the first time since 2020 after defeating Scotland 16–15 at Twickenham when Scotland missed a last-minute conversion.
  - A three-year-old girl is killed in a crash between a van and a tram in Greater Manchester. A man is subsequently charged in connection with the death.
  - The M4 is closed between the Severn Crossing and Junction 21 after the body of a 40-year-old male is discovered on the carriageway. Avon and Somerset Police subsequently confirm the deceased man had been arrested the previous day after accusations against him were livestreamed online by a vigilante group.
- 23 February –
  - Police searching for Jenny Hall, missing since 18 February, find a body in forest in a remote part of Teesdale.
  - A number of residents in the Wythenshawe area of Greater Manchester are evacuated following a fire involving a lorry on an industrial estate.
  - A 17-year-old boy is taken to hospital after being stabbed in the chest at a Primark store in Nottingham. A 16-year-old boy is subsequently arrested, charged and remanded in custody over the incident.
- 24 February –
  - The UK government publishes a list of 750 schools to establish breakfast clubs for pupils from April, with the pilot scheme paving the way for an England-wide initiative.
  - At Luton Crown Court, 19-year-old Nicholas Prosper pleads guilty to the murders of his mother and two siblings, who were shot dead in September 2024; it is also reported that Prosper planned to carry out a mass shooting at his school.
  - A pedestrian is killed and two others injured in a crash involving a bus and a car in Harrow.
  - An 84-year-old man is taken to hospital with critical injuries following an attack by a suspected American XL bully in Warrington, Cheshire; the dog, along with another suspected XL bully, are shot by armed police.
- 25 February –
  - Amanda Pritchard announces she will stepping down as chief executive of NHS England.
  - Deputy Commissioner of the Metropolitan Police Dame Lynne Owens announces her retirement.
  - Actor Alexander Westwood, who appeared in the Netflix series Sex Educationand who work at Shrewsbury Prison tourist site, is sentenced to fifteen and a half years in prison after he was convicted of 26 crimes against children and two pupils who went to him for acting tuition.
- 27 February – Police confirm that a 19-year-old woman, subsequently named as Morgan Dorset, has died following an attack by a suspected American XL bully at a property in Bristol the previous evening. Two people have been arrested in connection with the incident, while the dog has been destroyed.
- 28 February –
  - A new agreement with the UK government will provide an additional £889m to general practice, enabling surgeries to provide more appointments and for patients to request an appointment with their usual doctor, as well as an end to the "8am scramble" for appointments.
  - Molly Bury, a former police officer with Lancashire Police who shared information about the disappearance of Nicola Bulley with her family and gained unauthorised access to police computer systems over a number of years, is given a suspended sentence.
  - Charity worker Omar Wilson is sentenced to life imprisonment with a minimum term of 18 years for the murder of acclaimed chef Mussie Imnetu in August 2024.
  - The London Fire Brigade announces that Sherlock, a Cocker Spaniel who has served as its longest fire investigation dog, is to retire after 12 years.
  - Philip Foster, an actor who appeared in Channel 4 soap Brookside, is sentenced to eight and a half years in prison at Sheffield Crown Court over a £13.6m fraud involving fake model agencies.
  - A 17-year-old boy is taken to hospital with serious injuries after being stabbed in Nottingham City Centre.

=== March ===
- 1 March – Three teenage girls are charged with the manslaughter of a 75-year-old man, named as Fredi Rivero, who was attacked in Seven Sisters Road, Islington, London, on 27 February and died in hospital the following day.
- 2 March – A four-year-old girl dies following a suspected arson attack at a house in Manchester.
- 4 March – Police begin a murder investigation after a 16-year-old boy, subsequently named as Lathanlel Burrell, is killed in a shooting incident near Stockwell tube station in south London.
- 5 March – A child is killed and a second injured after a car is driven onto a sports pitch in Kendal, Cumbria; a man is arrested on suspicion of dangerous driving. She is subsequently named as 10-year-old Poppy Atkinson.
- 6 March – At Cambridge Crown Court, Kyle Clifford is convicted of the rape of his ex-girlfriend, Louise Hunt, during an attack which killed her along with her mother and sister in July 2024.
- 7 March –
  - Giant trolley scales – designed to weigh trolleys at the checkout to identify errors when scanning goods – are introduced on a trial basis at a Tesco store in Gateshead.
  - Belgrave Road, a coastal road in Ventnor, Isle of Wight, is closed after part of the cliff collapses, with police describing it as a "significant rockfall".
- 8 March –
  - Police searching for a suspect in the Valentine's Day shooting of Lisa Smith confirm a body was found in the River Thames near Rainham, Kent, the previous day. Police suspect Edward Stockings entered the water near Dartford on the day of the shooting.
  - The University of York acquires notebooks belonging to Eric Morecambe; the books contain jokes and sketches developed by the comedian.
  - A man is charged with the murder of Lathaniel Burrell, who was shot near Stockwell tube station.
- 11 March – NHS England confirms that as many as 5,000 people missed routine screenings for cancer and other illnesses because of a technical error dating back to 2008.
- 12 March – A 13-year-old girl appears in court holding a teddy bear as she is accused of the murder of a woman whose body was found following a house fire in Wellingborough, Northamptonshire two days earlier.
- 13 March – At a hearing at the Old Bailey, Hassan Sentamu is sentenced to life imprisonment with a minimum term of 23 years for the murder of Elianne Andam in Croydon, South London, in September 2023.
- 14 March –
  - Mark Ross, who killed Amazon delivery driver Claudiu Carol-Kondor while the latter was trying to prevent his van from being stolen in August 2024, is sentenced to life imprisonment by Leeds Crown Court with a minimum term of 30 years.
  - Daniel Bannister is sentenced to 16 weeks in prison for stalking Cheryl Tweedy after breaking a restraining order over previous incidents in which he harassed the singer.
  - Denise Fergus, the mother of murdered toddler James Bulger, launches a helpline for families affected by crime ahead of what would have been his 35th birthday.
  - The High Court rules that former Home Secretary Suella Braverman acted unlawfully by housing three asylum seekers at MDP Wethersfield in Essex between July 2023 and February 2024, where they lived in "prison like" conditions.
  - An 18-year-old man is killed and three teenage boys injured in a car crash near Shifnal, Shropshire.
- 15 March – A spokesperson for the Royal Cornwall Hospitals NHS Trust confirms a "small number" of patients have received incorrect text messages as a result of an error in its patient messaging system.
- 16 March –
  - A 17-year-old boy becomes the second teenager to die following a crash near Shifnal, Shropshire, two days earlier.
  - Toxicator, Alton Towers's newest ride, opens to the public, but is forced to close on its first day after a pipe starts leaking brown liquid. It reopened later in the day.
  - An appeal for a commemorative playground at Churchtown Primary School, attended by two of the victims of the 2024 Southport attack, reaches its £250,000 target.
  - A statue of peace campaigner Brian Haw is unveiled opposite the Imperial War Museum in Lambeth, London.
- 17 March – Following a trial at Chester Crown Court, Richard Burrows, who stole a terminally ill man's identity and spent almost three decades on the run, is convicted of 54 child sex abuse charges.
- 19 March – Police launch a manhunt after a prisoner, named as Jamie Cooper, escapes from a prison van travelling along the M55 motorway near Catforth, Lancashire, after faking a medical emergency while being escorted to court.
- 20 March –
  - Figures show that 30,000 housing projects were approved in England in 2024, a fall from 2023, and the lowest annual number since records began in 1979.
  - Police begin a murder investigation following the fatal shooting of a man in Tottenham, north London.
  - The 2025 City of London Corporation election is held in the City of London.
- 21 March –
  - The UK government announces the creation of a new national forest in the west of England, with the planting of 20 million new trees and the creation of 2,500 hectares of woodland.
  - Following a trial at Manchester Crown Court, Marcin Majerkiewicz is found guilty of the murder of his housemate, Stuart Everett, whose body was then dismembered and dumped in various locations. A sentencing hearing is scheduled for 28 March.
  - Far-right activist Stephen Yaxley-Lennon loses a High Court challenge to the conditions of his imprisonment at HMP Woodhill, where he has been segregated from the main prison population.
  - Police launch an investigation after a newly built Greggs store in Exhall, Coventry, is targeted in an arson attack days before it was scheduled to open.
- 22 March –
  - A Bronze Age stone circle is discovered by archaeologists during excavation at Farley Wood near Matlock, Derbyshire.
  - Escaped prisoner Jamie Cooper is recaptured by police in Blackburn, Lancashire, where he was a passenger in a car.
- 25 March –
  - Police begin an investigation after they are called to the discovery of the body of a newborn baby left in a bag outside a church in Notting Hill.
  - Ex-footballer Joey Barton receives a 12-week suspended prison sentence after he is found guilty of assaulting his wife at their home in June 2021.
- 28 March –
  - Brothers Robert and Mark Evans, who groomed and raped girls as young as 13, are sentenced to 17 and 14 years in prison respectively following a trial at Sheffield Crown Court.
  - Firefighters are called to a fire at the Grade II listed former Glendon and Rushton railway station in Northamptonshire; three people die as a result of the blaze.
- 29 March – Three Bolsover District Councillors resign from the Labour Party in protest at Keir Starmer's leadership, and will sit as independents.
- 30 March – The UK government announces that women in England will be able to get the morning after pill free at pharmacies from later in the year.
- 31 March –
  - The UK government agrees a new funding package with pharmacy negotiators in England, the announcement coming on the eve of plans by some pharmacies to cut their opening hours in protest at their limited financial resources.
  - Richard Cook, chairman of West Midlands Police Federation, is found in breach of professional standards over his actions, which included a suggestion that claims of racism in the force were "nonsense".
  - Police begin a search for an 11-year-old girl who went missing while paddling in the River Thames near London City Airport.
  - Three people are killed following a collision between a car and a bus in west London.

=== April ===
- 1 April –
  - At a hearing at Liverpool Crown Court, Kyle Shaw is sentenced to 20 months imprisonment suspended for 20 months after pleading guilty to stalking Strictly Come Dancing judge Shirley Ballas, who he believed was his aunt.
  - Charlotte Edwards, the former captain of the England women's cricket team, is appointed their new coach.
- 2 April – A 13-year-old girl, subsequently named as Layla Allen, is killed in a house fire in Prescot, Liverpool; a man, woman and five other children escape the property unharmed.
- 3 April – West Yorkshire Police begin a murder investigation after a 16-year-old boy, subsequently named as Ahmad Mamdouh Al Ibrahim, is stabbed to death in an incident in Huddersfield. A man is subsequently arrested, and appears in court charged with murder.
- 4 April –
  - Following a hearing at Liverpool Crown Court, Joanne Sharkey, a mother who killed her newborn baby in March 1998 and dumped the body in woodland, is given a two-year suspended sentence for the child's manslaughter, and after the presiding judge said the case "called for compassion". Sharkey was identified as the baby's mother following the arrest of her son on separate charges in July 2023, and when a DNA match was found.
  - Anti-abortion campaigner Livia Tossici-Bolt is given a two-year conditional discharge and ordered to pay £20,000 for two charges of breaching the public spaces protection order on two occasions in March 2023, when she protested outside an abortion clinic in Bournemouth.
  - Stephen Hartley, a Reform UK candidate for the local elections to Oxfordshire County Council, is suspended from the party after it was revealed he had posted comments in support of child abuser Jimmy Savile on social media.
  - Plans for the UK's first deep coalmine in three decades at Whitehaven, Cumbria, have been dropped by the company that planned to open the facility.
  - A 15-year-old boy dies after getting into trouble while swimming in a lake at Beckenham Place Park in south east London.
- 5 April –
  - A man in his 40s and a 10-year-old girl, subsequently identified as a father and daughter, are killed in a fire at a caravan park in Ingoldmells, Lincolnshire. An investigation later concludes the fire to be accidental.
  - Durham Police launch a murder investigation after a man, subsequently named as Barry Dawson, aged 60, dies following a shooting incident at a property in Stanley.
  - The Metropolitan Police begin a murder investigation following the death of 17-year-old Keiron Charles, one of two boys stabbed in an incident at Shepherd's Bush, west London. A 16-year-old boy is subsequently arrested in connection with the stabbings.
- 6 April – Cyclist Esme Moore has completed a 15,534 mile sponsored cycle ride from the Somerset village of Shipham to Singapore, raising £10,000 for charity.
- 7 April – Lichfield District Council says it will help clear the backlog of rubbish which has built up in Birmingham since refuse collectors went on strike there, beginning from 9 April.
- 8 April –
  - A 15-year-old boy and 13-year-old girl are convicted of the murder of 80-year-old Bhim Kohli, who was attacked while walking his dog in a park in Leicestershire on 1 September 2024.
  - Following a two-week trial, former prison governor Kerri Pegg is convicted of two counts of misconduct in public office over an affair with a prisoner.
  - Two men are killed after a light aircraft crashes at Darley Moor racetrack in Derbyshire.
- 9 April –
  - Following a four-week trial at the Old Bailey, Shakeil Thibou is found guilty of the murder of Cher Maximen at the 2024 Notting Hill Carnival.
  - Four men are charged with the murder of Jacqueline Rutter, who was shot in the chest at her home in Moreton, Wirral, in October 2022.
- 10 April – Deputy Prime Minister Angela Rayner has elicited a critical response from union leader Sharon Graham after urging striking refuse workers in Birmingham to accept a "significantly improved" offer.
- 11 April – Kara Alexander, aged 47, who killed her two young sons in December 2022 by drowning them in the bath at their home in Dagenham while she was in a cannabis-induced psychotic state, is sentenced to life imprisonment with a minimum term of 21 years after being found guilty of their murder.
- 12 April –
  - Nottinghamshire Police declare a major incident in Worksop following an explosion that destroyed a terraced house.
  - A 25-year-old woman is killed and a further two people injured after being struck by a car outside Crawley Leisure Park in West Sussex.
- 13 April –
  - Emergency services confirm that a man was killed in the previous day's explosion at a property in Worksop. Several properties have been damaged in what authorities are treating as a suspected gas explosion.
  - Military planners are called in to help deal with mounting rubbish in Birmingham, where refuse collectors have been on strike for a month.
- 14 April – Refuse workers "overwhelmingly" reject the latest pay offer from Birmingham City Council.
- 15 April –
  - Birmingham City Council says it is on track to clear the backlog of uncollected rubbish by the upcoming weekend despite the ongoing strike by refuse workers.
  - During a hearing at Luton Crown Court, Jazwell Brown pleads guilty to the murder of his partner, Joanne Pearson, and their neighbour, Teohna Grant, at a block of flats in Milton Keynes on Christmas Day 2024.
  - A 62-year-old woman, named as Suzanne Cherry, dies in hospital after she was struck by a van involved in a police pursuit at a golf course in the Staffordshire village of Little Aston. Three men are subsequently charged with her manslaughter.
- 18 April – Tom Simons, a former chief superintendent with Essex Police, is dismissed from the service after engaging in sexual behaviour without consent.
- 19 April – 5 May – 2025 World Snooker Championship
- 25 April –
  - Hoteliers in Liverpool vote to introduce a "tourist tax" for people staying overnight in the city.
  - Paul Butler is sentenced to life imprisonment with a minimum term of 27 years for the murder of his estranged wife, Claire Chick, who was stabbed to death in Plymouth in January 2025.
- 26 April – A man is arrested and anti-terrorism police are investigating after two women were injured in an incident involving a crossbow and a firearm in the Headingley area of Leeds.
- 27 April –
  - England win the 2025 Women's Six Nations Championship after defeating France 43–42, securing their seventh consecutive win and fourth successive Grand Slam.
  - Liverpool defeat Tottenham 5–1 to become English Premier League champions.
  - Archaeologists digging at a car park in Cambridge ahead of land redevelopment unearth an unopened Victorian soft drink bottle.
- 28 April – Edward Spencer, aged 19, who killed three teenagers in April 2024 after crashing while "showing off" as he drove them home from school, is sentenced to two years in prison.
- 29 April –
  - A block of flats in Maida Vale, London, is evacuated after fire breaks out at a neighbouring electricity substation.
  - Police announce the death of Owen Lawrence, the suspect in a crossbow attack in Leeds a few days earlier, who died in hospital of self-inflicted injuries.
  - Three people are taken to hospital following a suspected gas explosion that destroyed a house in Yate, near Bristol.
  - No criminal charges will be brought against Sheffield Steelers ice hockey player Matt Petgrave over his October 2023 collision with Adam Johnson, which resulted in Johnson's death.
- 30 April – Police confirm a body discovered in the River Thames is that of an 11-year-old girl who went missing in March.

=== May ===
- 1 May
  - 2025 Cornwall Council election
  - 2025 Suffolk County Council election
- 2 May – Reform UK wins 677 of around 1,600 seats contested in the English local elections, making gains mostly at the expense of the Conservatives. Reform also wins the Runcorn and Helsby by-election and the Lincolnshire mayoral election.
- 3 May –
  - Fourteen children are arrested following the death of a 14-year-old boy as a result of a fire at an industrial unit in Gateshead the previous evening. A further two arrests are later made. The boy is subsequently named as Layton Carr.
  - Danny Cahalane, who was attacked with acid at his home in Plymouth on 21 February, dies in hospital.
- 4 May – A wildfire breaks out on Dartmoor, requiring firefighters to attend.
- 8 May – A woman accused of having an illegal abortion during the COVID-19 pandemic is found not guilty following a trial at Isleworth Crown Court.
- 9 May –
  - Daniel Michael Graham and Adam Caruthers, who cut down the Sycamore Gap tree in September 2023, are found guilty of two counts of criminal damage following a trial. They will be sentenced on 15 July.
  - Police are investigating an alleged attack on a prison officer by Southport killer Axel Rudakubana, which is reported to have happened the previous day.
- 12 May – Abdirahman Ibrahim is sentenced to life imprisonment with a minimum term of 22 years for the murder of Liam Jones, an e-cyclist who Ibrahim killed with his vehicle after Jones did a wheelie on a road in Birmingham in August 2023.
- 14 May –
  - Reece Galbraith is sentenced to 14 years in prison after his cannabis factory exploded, destroying a block of flats and killing a seven-year-old boy.
  - A man suspected of a double stabbing in Huyton, Liverpool, is being treated in hospital after he was shot by armed police.
- 15 May –
  - Lucy Connolly, the wife of a Northamptonshire councillor, who was sent to prison for inciting racial violence over an online post during the 2024 England riots, begins an appeal hearing against her sentence.
  - Two firefighters and a member of the public are killed at a fire on an industrial estate in Bicester, Oxfordshire. The firefighters are subsequently confirmed to be from Oxfordshire Fire and Rescue Service and the London Fire Brigade.
- 16 May –
  - Shakeil Thibou is sentenced to life imprisonment with a minimum term of 29 years for the murder of Cher Maximen at the 2024 Notting Hill Carnival.
  - At a hearing at Preston Crown Court, former prison governor Kerri Pegg, who was convicted of misconduct in a public office over a relationship with a notorious criminal, is sentenced to nine years in prison.
  - Rapper Chris Brown is remanded in custody over an alleged attack at a London nightclub in 2023.
- 17 May – Crystal Palace defeat Manchester City 1–0 to win the 2025 FA Cup final.
- 18 May – Chelsea defeat Manchester United 3–0 to win the 2025 Women's FA Cup final.
- 20 May –
  - Lucy Connolly loses her appeal against her sentence.
  - Two teenagers—a boy of 17 and a girl of 16—plead guilty to torturing two kittens to death at Ruislip Golf Course on 3 May.
  - An inquest into the death of Kyra Hill, an eleven-year-old girl who drowned at Liquid Leisure, a water park in Berkshire in August 2022, finds she was unlawfully killed following gross breaches in health and safety.
  - A bid to reopen the Crane club, a nightclub that was the scene of the Boxing Day 2022 murder of footballer Cody Fisher, is rejected by Birmingham City Council.
- 21 May –
  - US singer Chris Brown is released on £5m bail, enabling him to begin an international tour on 8 June.
  - The legal right to wild camping on Dartmoor is upheld by the Supreme Court following a case brought by two landowners, who had argued people should not be able to camp without permission from landowners.
  - An inquest into the death of Sean Fitzgerald, who was shot by police during a drugs raid in Coventry on 4 January 2019, concludes he was killed lawfully.
  - Three teenagers are found guilty of the murder of 17-year-old Reuben Higgins, who was stabbed during an altercation at a vape shop in Marston Green, West Midlands, in October 2024.
- 22 May –
  - A number of pregnant women are evacuated to safety after fire breaks out in the roof of St Michael's Hospital, Bristol.
  - Doctors and teachers in England receive a 4% pay rise after the UK government accepts the recommendation of pay review bodies.
  - Two people are injured following a crash between a train and a tractor at a level crossing near Leominster, Herefordshire; a man is arrested following the incident.
  - Wrexham, Shropshire and Midlands Railway submits an application to the Office of Rail and Road to operate an open access train service linking Wrexham with London Euston.
- 23 May –
  - The British Medical Association threatens strike action over the UK government's 4% pay increase for doctors in England, describing the offer as "derisory".
  - Two teenagers plead guilty to the murder of 14-year-old Kelyan Bokassa, who was stabbed multiple times with a machete as he stepped from a bus in Woolwich, south east London on 7 January.
- 24 May –
  - A man is arrested following the deaths of a woman and three children in a house fire in Brent, north west London.
  - Birmingham bin strike: Birmingham City Council is granted a court order to stop waste vehicles being blocked from leaving depots.
  - A man is killed in a crash while taking part in the Vintage Motorsport Festival at Donington Park in Leicestershire.
- 26 May – A 53-year-old man is arrested for injuring 79 people after driving a Ford Galaxy into a victory parade on Water Street celebrating Liverpool F.C.'s Premier League win.
- 27 May –
  - Rawal Rehman, who crashed his car into a tram then killed a three-year-old girl in Manchester City Centre after taking 20 lines of cocaine in February, is sentenced to 12 years in prison after pleading guilty to death by dangerous driving.
  - Indigo Rumbelow, Margaret Reid, Leanorah Ward and Daniel Knorr, four Just Stop Oil members who planned to glue themselves to the taxiway of Manchester Airport in August 2024, are sentenced to between 18 and 30 months in prison, and each fined £2,000.
  - England goalkeeper Mary Earps announces her retirement from international football five weeks before the start of Euro 2025.
- 28 May – Ricky Sawyer, a self-styled "beauty consultant" who specialises in liquid Brazilian butt lifts, is banned from carrying out cosmetic procedures across England and Wales after it was found he had carried out risky procedures.
- 30 May –
  - A 60-year-old woman and a 15-year-old girl are killed in a house fire at Bletchley near Milton Keynes.
  - Two adults and a teenager are killed in a crash on the M5 motorway in Gloucestershire. A second child is being treated in hospital.
- 31 May – Four people are injured after a vehicle is driven into pedestrians in Leicester City Centre.

=== June ===
- 3 June –
  - An inquest into the February 2017 death of Jodey Whiting, who was housebound, concludes she took her life after the Department for Work and Pensions wrongly stopped her disability benefits. The inquest is the second into the death after her mother campaigned for the role she said the Department for Work of Pensions played in her death to be taken into account.
  - England midfielder Fran Kirby announces her retirement from international football ahead of Euro 2025.
- 4 June –
  - An investigation into the Leominster train crash initially concludes that a passenger train was travelling at 80 mph (129 km/h) when it struck a trailer on the track.
  - England defender Millie Bright says she is unavailable for selection for England's Euro 2025 team because she is unable "to give 100% mentally or physically". She undergoes a knee operation the following day.
  - The UK government announces that any child in England whose parents receive Universal Credit will be eligible for free school meals from September.
  - A 16-year-old boy, subsequently named as Abdullah Yaser Abdullah Al Yazidi, is killed in a suspected hit-and-run incident in Sheffield. On 8 June it is reported that two men have been charged with murder, as well as three counts of attempted murder.
- 5 June – A 15-year-old boy and 13-year-old girl are sentenced for the manslaughter of 80-year-old Bhim Kohli, who died a day after he was racially abused and assaulted in a park in Braunstone, Leicestershire, in September 2024. The boy receives seven years in custody, while the girl is made subject of a three-year rehabilitation order and given a six-month curfew.
- 6 June – Simon Clark, a 46-year-old teacher who posed as a teenager online to ask girls for indecent images of themselves, is sentenced to eight years in prison by Chester Crown Court.
- 9 June –
  - North East London NHS Foundation Trust and a staff member are found guilty of health and safety failings over the death of a young woman in a mental health unit in 2015.
  - Engineering work begins on overhead power cables in the Severn Tunnel linking England and Wales by rail, reducing train services until 20 June.
- 13 June – Seven members of a grooming gang are convicted of abusing and raping two teenage girls in Rochdale.
- 16 June – Nursery worker Roksana Lecka is convicted of abusing 21 babies, including kicking one boy in the face and stepping on his shoulder.
- 17 June –
  - Police begin a murder investigation following the death of a 46-year-old woman, named as Annabel Rook, at a property in Newington, north London.
  - Jazwell Brown is sentenced to life imprisonment with a minimum term of 39 years after being convicted of the murder of his partner, Joanne Pearson, and a neighbour, Teohna Grant, at a block of flats in Bletchley on Christmas Day 2024. Brown, who also attacked his son, was high on crack cocaine at the time.
  - BBC News reports that organisers of the Notting Hill Carnival have expressed fears for its future without "urgent funding" from the UK government.
- 22 June – 350th anniversary of Royal Observatory, Greenwich.
- 25 June – Drina Gray, who made death threats to neighbours who lived in a flat above her own, is sentenced to three years and four months in prison following a trial at Kingston upon Thames Crown Court.
- 26 June –
  - A double-decker bus carrying students from Barton Peveril Sixth Form College plunges into a river in Eastleigh, Hampshire, injuring all 19 passengers, including five who are hospitalized.
  - Several rail lines are closed causing widespread disruption and delays to train services after a London Northwestern train derails near Milton Keynes. No passengers were on board at the time, and no injuries are reported.
  - Edward Vines, who breached an order not to contact journalist Emily Maitlis while serving a sentence at HMP Lowdham Grange, is sentenced to a further five years in custody.
- 27 June – Police searching for Reanne Wilson, a sex worker missing from Coventry since May, discover a body in Binley Woods. A man is also charged with her murder, while a second is charged with assisting an offender.
- 30 June – Ryland Headley, a 92-year-old man, is convicted for the 1967 murder of Louisa Dunne, which is believed to be the UK's longest-running cold case ever to be solved.

=== July ===
- 2 July – Stephen Carr, who in September 2024 tried to murder his wife with a crossbow, as well as stabbing her multiple times at their home near York, is sentenced to 17 years in prison.
- 3 July – Two teenage boys are killed after being struck by a train at Poynton railway station in Cheshire. British Transport Police say they are not treating the deaths as suspicious.
- 5 July – A four-year-old boy is killed after a gravestone fell on him at a cemetery in Haslingden, Lancashire.
- 6 July - The National Year of Reading was announced for the following year.
- 8 July – Resident doctors in England, previously known as junior doctors, vote to take strike action after being offered a 5.4% pay increase for the current financial year.
- 9 July –
  - Hassan Jhangur is convicted of the December 2023 murder of Chris Marriott, who was killed when Jhangur crashed his car into a group of people at a wedding in Sheffield.
  - Eight residents of a Sunderland care home are taken to hospital after a BMW involved in a police chase crashes into the building. Two men are arrested over the incident.
- 10 July –
  - Police launch a murder investigation following the death of a man who was stabbed outside a hotel in the Knightsbridge area of London. The victim is subsequently named as Blue Stevens, aged 24.
  - Department for Education figures indicate school suspensions and exclusions in England have reached their highest since 2006, with 954,952 suspensions in state schools in 2023–24, a 21% increase on the previous year, while exclusions rose by 16% to 10,885 over the same period.
- 11 July – Northumberland Police confirm that two women, one in her 80s and one in her 90s, have died in hospital after a BMW crashed into a care home in Sunderland. Two men, aged 21, who were arrested over the incident, are re-arrested on manslaughter charges. They are remanded in custody by magistrates the following day ahead of an appearance at Newcastle Crown Court on 11 August.
- 13 July –
  - An investigation is launched after a Battle of Britain Memorial Flight Avro Lancaster PA474 bomber experienced an engine problem during a families day at RAF Waddington in Lincolnshire.
  - An Amazon driver is killed at a level crossing following a collision between a train and an Amazon delivery van in Teynham, Kent.
- 15 July –
  - Chris Weston, the chief executive of Thames Water, tells MPs the utility company is "extremely stressed" and will take "at least a decade to turn around". Thames Water reported a £1.65bn loss for the 2024–25 financial year.
  - Three Rivers District Council in Hertfordshire grants Warner Bros. Studios Leavesden permission to build a temporary school for children participating in the Harry Potter TV series, with the school expected to operate for a decade, the planned timeframe for producing the series.
  - An elderly couple, subsequently named as grandparents Peter Eric Greener and Sheila Jackson, are killed died in a house fire at their home in St Helens, Merseyside. A man is subsequently arrested on suspicion of murder.
- 16 July – Fake doctor Mohammed Alazawi, who carried out a number of unsafe and illegal circumcisions across the UK, is sentenced to nine years in prison by Southwark Crown Court.
- 17 July –
  - South Cambridgeshire District Council votes to permanently adopt a four-day week for its staff on fully pay following a trial that began in January 2023.
  - The Court of Appeal clears Errol Campbell and Ronald Da Souza, wrongfully convicted of separate offences during the 1970s following allegations made by corrupt British Transport Police officer Detective Sergeant Derek Ridgewell.
  - BBC News reports that the Metropolitan Police plans to close half the front desks at its police stations as part of budget cuts.
- 20 July –
  - England say they are working with police after footballer Jess Carter revealed she had been the target of online racist abuse.
  - Six people are arrested following a protest outside a hotel housing asylum seekers in Epping, which erupted into violence.
- 21 July –
  - A double-decker bus has its roof torn off after crashing into a bridge in Eccles, leaving 15 people injured.
  - Plans to expand the site of the All England Lawn Tennis and Croquet Club can proceed after the High Court rejects a legal challenge from a local group in Wimbledon that sought to block the expansion.
  - Train services in and out of London Waterloo station are severely disrupted following a signal failure.
  - Police searching for 38-year-old Rachel Booth, missing from Barnton, Cheshire, since the early hours of 19 July, find a body in a lake at Oakmere.
  - Melissa Wilband, who was convicted in April of killing her four-month-old daughter by shaking her in 2020, is sentenced to 15 years in prison by Bristol Crown Court.
- 22 July –
  - Habibur Masum is sentenced to life imprisonment with a minimum term of 28 years for the murder of his wife, Kulsuma Akter, who he stabbed as she pushed their infant son through Bradford City Centre in April 2024. She had been staying at a women's refuge at the time of her murder.
  - The British Medical Association announces that resident doctors in England will begin a five-day strike on Friday 25 July after talks with the Health Secretary failed to reach a conclusion.
- 23 July – Essex Police reject allegations that officers bussed pro-refugee protestors to a hotel in Epping housing asylum seekers.
- 24 July –
  - David Gunter is convicted of the murder of his two-week-old son, Brendon Staddon, at the premature baby unit of Yeovil District Hospital in March 2024.
  - Epping Forest District Council votes to urge the government to stop using the Bell Hotel to house asylum seekers following a string of anti-immigration protests at the site.
- 25 July –
  - Resident doctors in England begin a five-day strike over pay and conditions.
  - Two teenage boys are sentenced to life imprisonment with a minimum term of 15 years and 10 months for the murder of 14-year-old Kelyan Bokassa, who was attacked with machetes on a bus in south east London on 7 January.
- 26 July – Around 350–400 anti-immigration protestors hold a demonstration at a hotel housing asylum seekers in Norwich.
- 27 July –
  - A large fire involving 20 tonnes of tyres breaks out on an industrial estate in the West Midlands.
  - Eight children and one adult are taken to hospital after falling ill at a summer camp in Leicestershire. All are subsequently discharged from hospital, while a man is later charged with child cruelty.
- 30 July –
  - Thousands of people line the streets of Birmingham to watch a funeral procession for Ozzy Osbourne.
  - The British Medical Association and Health Secretary Wes Streeting agree to restart talks following the end of a five-day strike by resident doctors.
- 31 July – Nursing leaders in England warn of potential strike action unless the UK government gives their members a pay rise worth more than the 3.6% on offer for 2025–26.

=== August ===
- 1 August – Greater Manchester Police begin a murder investigation following the fatal stabbing of a 19-year-old man in a car park in the Bury area.
- 2 August –
  - A man is remanded in custody charged with child cruelty offences in relation to sweets alleged laced with sedatives after children fell ill at a summer camp in Leicestershire.
  - Fifteen people are arrested following a series of anti-immigration demonstrations across England.
  - A man dies after falling from a height at an Oasis concert at Wembley Stadium.
- 5 August – Warwickshire Police rejects a claim made by George Finch, Warwickshire County Council's Reform UK leader, that it held back information over the alleged rape of a 12-year-old girl in Nuneaton.
- 6 August –
  - A number of flights to and from Birmingham Airport are subject to delays or cancellations after a light aircraft makes an emergency landing on its runway.
  - Roy Barclay is sentenced to life imprisonment with a minimum term of 25 years for the murder of Anita Rose, who he attacked while on the run from prison in July 2024.
- 7 August – A four-year-old boy is killed after being hit by a bus outside the Queen Elizabeth The Queen Mother Hospital in Margate, Kent.
- 8 August –
  - A Tree Preservation Order is issued for a grapefruit tree in Battersea, London, one of only a few in the UK to be growing outside Kew Gardens.
  - A 15-year-old boy is found guilty of the murder of Harvey Willgoose, who was stabbed at Sheffield's All Saints Catholic High School on 3 February.
- 9 August –
  - A number of anti-immigration protests take place across England, including one at Nuneaton attended by several hundred people.
  - A major event is declared after 100 firefighters are called to tackle two heathland fires at Holt Heath in Dorset.
  - British Eventing reports the death of horse rider Sarah Yorke, who died following a fall while competing at the Aston-le-Walls Horse Trials in Northamptonshire the previous day.
  - A family of four from Thetford, Norfolk, are killed in a motoring accident at Castro Verde in Portugal while on holiday.
- 10 August – The Grade II listed Raven Hotel in Droitwich Spa is severely damaged by an arson attack.
- 12 August –
  - Following a trial at Birmingham Crown Court, US citizen Aimee Betro, who was hired to carry out a hit on a Birmingham shopkeeper and travelled from her home in Wisconsin to carry out the unsuccessful killing, is found guilty of conspiracy to murder.
  - Epping Forest District Council applies for a High Court injunction to prevent asylum seekers being housed at the Bell Hotel in Epping, which has been the seen of anti-immigration protests.
  - West Yorkshire Police launch a murder investigation following the death of a 13-year-old girl who was found unresponsive at a flat in Huddersfield the previous evening and died in the early hours in hospital.
- 13 August – Langdale Moor wildfire: A major incident is declared as firefighters continue to battle a blaze that broke out on Langdale Moor in North Yorkshire two days earlier.
- 14 August – An inquest rules the February 2022 death of Ruth Szymankiewicz, a 14-year-old girl who was left alone to self harm at a psychiatric hospital in Berkshire, as a case of unlawful killing.
- 15 August –
  - Following a trial at Snaresbrook Crown Court, Labour councillor Ricky Jones, who called for far-right activists' throats to be cut at an anti-racism rally, is found not guilty of encouraging violent disorder.
  - Hit-and-run driver Ashir Shahid, who struck a pregnant woman on a zebra crossing causing her to lose her baby, is sentenced to 13 years in prison after pleading guilty to causing death by dangerous driving and serious injury by dangerous driving.
  - A sonic boom is reported in parts of eastern and south eastern England after three Quick Reaction Alert (QRA) Typhoon fighter aircraft are deployed from RAF Coningsby to escort a civilian plane that had lost contact with air traffic control.
- 16 August –
  - A man is arrested after AFC Bournemouth player Antoine Semenyo reported being racially abused during the opening match of the Premier League season at Anfield.
  - A dozen people are arrested at a demonstration in Norwich City Centre for showing support for Palestine Action, which was proscribed as a terror group by the UK government.
  - Police begin a murder investigation following the death of a woman at a property in Chadwell Heath, London. Three men are subsequently arrested in connection with the death.
- 17 August – Several hundred people take part in an anti-immigration protest in Dudley, West Midlands.
- 18 August –
  - Javon Riley is convicted of his part in a shooting in Dalston, London, that left a nine-year-old girl with a bullet in her brain in May 2024.
  - Reform UK councillor Joseph Boam is removed as the deputy leader of Leicestershire County Council, where the party runs a minority administration, after three months in the post. He is also removed from his role in cabinet, with no explanation given for either decisions.
- 19 August –
  - Epping Forest District Council wins a temporary High Court injunction against asylum seekers being housed at the Bell Hotel in Epping, meaning they have been removed from the premises.
  - Evan Forde pleads guilty to causing the death of Maria Carolina Do Nascimento in a high-speed car crash in north London on Christmas Day 2022.
  - Five police officers from the Greater Manchester Police are being investigated following the death in custody of Ellis Rocks, a 26-year-old male arrested on drugs charges on 31 July.
  - Firefighters are called to tackle a fire at the 18th century Grade I listed Woolton Hall in Liverpool.
  - Police begin a murder investigation following the fatal stabbing of an ice cream man, subsequently named as Shazad Khan, in Wembley, north London.
- 20 August –
  - Former priest Chris Brain, who led a cult-style church group during the 1980s, is convicted of 17 counts of sexual abuse against nine women following a trial at Inner London Crown Court.
  - Conservative Party leader Kemi Badenoch begins encouraging Conservative controlled councils to launch legal challenges against hotels housing asylum seekers in their areas following the legal case involving the Bell Hotel in Epping.
- 21 August –
  - A man is charged with the murder of ice cream seller Shazad Khan.
  - The RMT announces a week of rolling strikes on the London Underground from 5 September.
  - Lucy Connolly, who was sentenced to 31 months in prison for urging her Twitter followers to "set fire" to hotels containing asylum seekers in the wake of the 2024 Southport attack, is released from HMP Peterborough after serving ten months.
  - During a hearing at Birmingham Crown Court, Aimee Betro is sentenced to 30 years in prison.
- 22 August – The UK government lodges an appeal against the decision that prevents it from housing asylum seekers at the Bell Hotel in Epping.
- 22 August – 27 September – 2025 Women's Rugby World Cup
- 24 August – Bradford hosts the first Great Northern Day, a day celebrating all things northern.
- 25 August – The Metropolitan Police confirm they have made 423 arrests over the two days of the Notting Hill Carnival, but say there were "far fewer" incidents of serious violence than in previous years.
- 26 August – Transport for London launches a campaign to target the "disruptive behaviour" of passengers playing music through their mobile phone speakers on public transport, and encourage them to wear headphones.
- 28 August –
  - Former Metropolitan Police special constable James Bubb, who now identifies as a woman named Gwyn Samuels, is found guilty of raping and sexually assaulting a 12-year-old girl following a trial at Amersham Law Courts. The offences occurred prior to Bubb undergoing the transitioning process.
  - Reform UK's Mick Barton, the leader of Nottinghamshire County Council, has banned journalists from the Nottingham Post and its online version, Nottingham Live, from speaking to him or any of his councillors following a dispute over a story the newspaper printed about reorganising local government. A few days later Barton says that his councillors are not banned from speaking to journalists from the newspaper.
  - An East Midlands Railway train from Nottingham to London St Pancras is forced to stop near Market Harborough in Leicestershire because of people being lowered over a bridge to hang flags.
- 29 August –
  - The Court of Appeal overturns a temporary injunction that prevented asylum seekers being housed at the Bell Hotel in Epping.
  - Three arrests are made as protestors gather outside the Bell Hotel following the court ruling.
  - Elias Morgan is convicted of the February 2024 murder of former prison officer Lenny Scott, who was shot outside a gym in Skelmersdale, Lancashire. The killing was in revenge for confiscating a mobile phone from Morgan's prison cell four years earlier.
  - During a hearing at Woolwich Crown Court, Chao Xu pleads guilty to sexual offences against six women, including a case of drugging and raping one of his victims.
- 30 August –
  - Five people are arrested after masked men tried to enter a hotel housing asylum seekers in the London district of West Drayton.
  - A number of councils say they still intend to mount legal cases to prevent asylum seekers being housed in hotels in their areas despite the previous day's Court of Appeal ruling.
  - A Section 60AA order, under the Public Order Act 1986, is put in place in Epping, allowing Essex Police to compel protestors outside the Bell Hotel to remove face coverings.
- 31 August –
  - British Transport Police are investigating two stabbings at Oxford Circus tube station within 24 hours that they suspect are connected.
  - Three protestors are arrested as demonstrations continue at the Bell Hotel in Epping.

=== September ===
- 2 September –
  - Epping Forest District Council seeks permission to take its case against the UK government over the Bell Hotel to the Supreme Court, but is refused permission to do so.
  - Elias Morgan is sentenced to life imprisonment with a minimum term of 45 years for the murder of former prison officer Lenny Scott.
- 3 September –
  - The UK government announces plans to ban people under the age of 16 from being able to purchase energy drinks in England.
  - Nigel Farage says he will "have a little chat" with Mick Barton, the leader of Nottinghamshire County Council, over his decision to ban contact with journalists from the Nottingham Post.
- 4 September –
  - Daniel Levy steps down as executive chairman of Tottenham Hotspur F.C. after 24 years in the role.
  - NHS vascular surgeon Neil Hopper, who had his own legs removed then claimed they had been amputated as a result of sepsis, is sentenced to two years and eight months in prison for insurance fraud and possessing extreme pornography following a trial at Truro Crown Court.
  - Ethiopian Hadush Kebatu, whose arrest led to protests outside the Bell Hotel in Epping, is found guilty of sexually assaulting a 14-year-old girl and a woman.
  - Warwickshire County Council's Reform cabinet votes to strip the chief executive of responsibility for deciding what flags can be flown outside its building, handing it to the council chairman.
- 5 September – Matthew Crossland, who was filmed stoking a fire outside a Holiday Inn in Rotherham on 4 August 2024 during the 2024 United Kingdom riots, is sentenced to nine years in prison.
- 6 September – Jamie Borthwick, who plays Jay Brown in EastEnders, is axed from the show.
- 9 September – West Midlands Police launch an investigation following the rape of a Sikh woman in Oldbury, and are treating the incident as a racially aggravated crime.
- 12 September –
  - The Metropolitan Police suspends nine officers based at Charing Cross Police Station and refers itself to the Independent Office for Police Conduct following a BBC investigation that raised concerns about the conduct of 11 present and former officers and a member of civilian staff at the station.
  - Javon Riley is sentenced to life imprisonment with a minimum term of 34 years for his part in a shooting in Dalston, London, in May 2024 that left three people injured, including a nine-year-old girl who was left with a bullet lodged in her brain. Riley had acted as the getaway driver in what was a gangland shooting.
- 13 September – Five people are injured following an explosion at a house in Bradford, West Yorkshire. A man is subsequently arrested in connection with the incident.
- 15 September – Greater Manchester Police begin a murder investigation after a 15-year-old boy is stabbed to death in the Moss Side area of Manchester.
- 19 September – At a hearing at Preston Crown Court, HGV driver Neil Platt, who drove his lorry into the back of a car on the M58 in Lancashire while scrolling through pornography on his phone, killing the car's occupant instantly, is sentenced to ten years in prison, and banned from driving for a further seven upon his release.
- 20 September –
  - A man is arrested on suspicion of attempted murder following a shooting at the Mango nightclub in Birmingham which left four people injured, one of them critically.
  - 2025 Women's Rugby World Cup: England defeat France 35–17 in their semi-final match to secure a place with Canada in the final.
  - Chester Racecourse stages its first dachshund derby.
- 21 September – London's Oxford Street is scheduled to be closed to cars for 24 hours to mark World Car Free Day.
- 22 September –
  - Two men who killed two e-bike riders in Sunbury-on-Thames in July 2024 after mistaking them as burglars are sentenced to life imprisonment after being convicted of their murder.
  - New advice is issued to GPs in England recommending they "think twice" if they are unable to diagnose a patient after three visits or if symptoms get worse. The rules have been drawn up following the death of Jessica Brady, a patient who died from cancer in 2020 after making multiple visits to her GP, who diagnosed her symptoms as those of long COVID.
- 23 September – Hadush Kebatu, whose crimes led to protests outside the Bell Hotel in Epping, is sentenced to twelve months in prison for the sexual assault of a 14-year-old girl and a woman.
- 26 September –
  - Northamptonshire Police officer PC Faizaan Najeeb, who was struck by a car while responding to a crash on 19 September, dies in hospital.
  - Nursery worker Roksana Lecka is sentenced to eight years in prison for multiple accounts of child cruelty after abusing 21 babies in her care.
- 28 September – Two people are taken to hospital after a ceiling collapses at a Toby Carvery in Gloucester while customers are eating dinner.
- 30 September – The Nottingham Post launches a legal case against Nottinghamshire County Council's leader, Mick Barton, over his decision to ban councillors from his Reform UK administration from speaking to the newspaper.

=== October ===
- 1 October – Every GP practice in England becomes legally required to offer online appointment bookings throughout the day.
- 2 October – Reform UK-led Nottinghamshire County Council partially lift the ban they imposed on the Nottingham Post in response to a request to lift it in full from a law firm representing the publishers.
- 3 October – At a hearing at Bristol Crown Court, Daniel Gunter is sentenced to life imprisonment with a minimum of 20 years for the murder of his two-week old son, Brendon Staddon, at the neonatal unit of Yeovil District Hospital in March 2024.
- 4 October – Police launch an investigation following a suspected arson attack at a mosque in Peacehaven, East Sussex.
- 6 October –
  - Grace O'Malley-Kumar, one of the victims of the 2023 Nottingham attacks, is to be awarded the George Medal for making the "ultimate sacrifice" to protect her friend.
  - Former England rugby union captain Lewis Moody reveals he has been diagnosed with motor neurone disease.
  - Three men who fought with police outside the Bell Hotel in Epping are sentenced to time in prison, becoming the first to be sentenced to prison over the disorder.
- 7 October –
  - Following a trial at Birmingham Crown Court, Peter Windsor, who sent the television and radio presenter Myleene Klass items including handcuffs, a gun and a police uniform, is convicted of stalking her, along with Classic FM presenter Katie Breathwick.
  - Axe Valley Wildlife Park in Devon announces its closure.
- 8 October –
  - Police searching for 27-year-old Malgorzata Wnuczek, a Polish woman living in Leicester who disappeared on 31 May 2006, find human remains during a search of scrubland at the Great Central Way.
  - The children's books The Spy Dog, Spy Pups and Spy Cat by Derby author Andrew Cope are pulled from school libraries after a web address printed on the back was found to link to explicit content after the URL of the books' original companion site was taken over by a third party.
- 10 October –
  - A transgender woman is jailed for deception sex assault after being convicted of deceiving a heterosexual man into performing a sex act.
  - Alfie Franco is sentenced to life imprisonment with a minimum of 23 years for the murder of Syrian refugee Ahmad Mamdouh Al Ibrahim, who was stabbed with a flick knife in Huddersfield on 3 April 2025.
  - A man receives lifechanging injuries after being shot by police who entered a property in Walthamstow, London, while responding to reports of a man with a gun making threats to kill.
- 15 October – At a hearing at Hull Crown Court, former funeral director Robert Bush pleads guilty to 36 charges of fraud after a major investigation into human remains found at his premises, including four babies lost in pregnancy.
- 16 October – A 21-year-old man, subsequently named as Harley Pearce, the son of ex-England footballer Stuart Pearce, is killed in an accident involving a tractor in Witcombe, near Gloucester.
- 18 October – The Environment Agency begins an investigation after a thick covering of white foam appears on a stretch of the River Thet in Thetford, Norfolk.
- 19 October – Reform UK's Linden Kemkaran, the leader of Kent County Council, threatens to expose the "cowards" who leaked a video appearing to show her swearing and telling councillors from her party to "suck it up".
- 20 October –
  - The Metropolitan Police announces it will no longer investigate non crime hate incidents.
  - Four Reform UK councillors on Kent County Council – Paul Thomas, Oliver Bradshaw, Bill Barret and Maxine Fothergrill – are suspended from the party following leaked video footage of a heated online meeting.
  - Following a trial at Manchester Crown Court, Karl Davies, who encouraged a schoolgirl he groomed and sexually abused to cut herself, is sentenced to 20 years in prison, becoming the first person to be given a custodial sentence for encouraging self-harm under the Online Safety Act.
- 22 October –
  - At his sentencing hearing for the February 2025 murder of Harvey Willgoose, reporting restrictions are lifted on naming 15-year-old Mohammed Umar Khan as the killer. Khan is sentenced to life imprisonment with a minimum term of 16 years.
  - At an Old Bailey hearing, Evan Forde is sentenced to 12 years in prison for causing the death of Maria Carolina Do Nascimento during a high-speed car crash on Christmas Day 2022.
  - Manchester Pride goes into voluntary liquidation, placing the future of one of the UK's largest LGBT events at risk.
  - Reform UK's Linden KemKaran issues a statement calling for councillors to back her in writing following advice to do so from her party's headquarters.
- 23 October –
  - Three Metropolitan Police officers are sacked for gross misconduct after footage of them appeared in an undercover BBC Panorama documentary.
  - The British Medical Association announces a fresh five-day strike for resident doctors starting on Friday 14 November after talks with the UK government reached an impasse.
- 24 October –
  - Sheffield Wednesday is placed into administration.
  - BBC analysis of NHS data suggests that cases of obsessive compulsive disorder in those aged 16 to 24 in England has tripled in the past ten years, and is now the second most common mental health condition in England among young adults.
  - Alberton House, a multi-storey property on a demolition site in Manchester City Centre, partially collapses.
  - A fourth Metropolitan Police officer is sacked following disciplinary proceedings over footage that appeared in a BBC documentary.
  - Leeds Bradford Airport is closed overnight due to an "unforeseen issue with the runway".
  - Following a trial at Birmingham Crown Court, Deng Chol Majek is found guilty of the murder of Rhiannon Whyte, who died in hospital after she was stabbed multiple times with a screwdriver at Bescot Stadium railway station in Walsall, West Midlands in October 2024.
  - A police manhunt begins after Ethiopian national Hadush Kebatu, sentenced to prison for sexually assaulting a 14-year-old girl, is accidentally released from prison.
- 25 October –
  - The runway of Leeds Bradford Airport reopens following repairs.
  - An FA Trophy football match between Bastingstoke and Dorchester is abandoned after Dorchester player Wes Fogden suffers a serious injury to his neck.
- 26 October – Beaulieu Park railway station opens in north Chelmsford, Essex.
- 27 October – A man is arrested after three people are stabbed, one fatally, at Midhurst Gardens in Uxbridge, west London.
- 28 October – Steve Reed, Secretary of State for Housing, Communities and Local Government, announces that Surrey County Council will be abolished and replaced by two unitary authorities; East Surrey and West Surrey.
- 29 October –
  - Following a trial at the Old Bailey, teenager Areece Lloyd-Hall is found guilty of the murder of 16-year-old Harry Pitman, who was fatally stabbed at a New Year's Eve event in north London on 31 December 2023.
  - At a hearing at Derby Crown Court, Haybe Cabdiraxmaan Nur is sentenced to life imprisonment with a minimum term of 25 years for the murder of Gurvinder Johal, who was stabbed through the heart in an attack at a Lloyds Bank in Derby on 6 May.
  - A man is charged with murder following a triple stabbing in Uxbridge during which one person was killed.
- 31 October –
  - The UK government says that a proposed plan to trial free bus passes for people under the age of 22 in England will not go ahead because it is "unaffordable".
  - Three Just Stop Oil activists who sprayed Stonehenge with orange powder are cleared of causing a public nuisance.
  - Former international hockey player Mohamed Samak is sentenced to life imprisonment with a minimum of 19 years and 247 days for the murder of his wife Joanne Samak at their home in Droitwich Spa, Worcestershire, on 1 July 2024. Samak fatally stabbed his wife, then claimed her injuries were self-inflicted.
  - Convicted murderer Shaine March, who was on licence when he stabbed his pregnant girlfriend, Alana Odysseos, to death at her flat in Walthamstow following an argument in July 2024, is sentenced to life imprisonment with a minimum term of 42 years.

=== November ===
- 2 November –
  - Merseyside Police confirm that a man is charged with disrupting a lawful activity after joining the England line up during a rugby league match against Australia at the Hill Dickinson Stadium the previous day.
  - A 70-year-old man is killed in a light aircraft crash at Sherburn in Elmet, North Yorkshire.
- 4 November – Education Secretary Bridget Phillipson announces changes to the curriculum studied at schools in England that will see pupils learning about subjects such as AI and mortgages, following the first review of education for a decade.
- 5 November –
  - Three inmates at HMP Wakefield are arrested on suspicion of murder following the death of Kyle Bevan, a prisoner convicted of the murder of his partner's two-year-old son in 2020.
  - Online prankster Daniel Jarvis, who invaded an England v Ireland match at Dublin's Aviva Stadium on 7 September, is given a five-year ban from attending national and international games by Medway Magistrates Court. He must also surrender his passport during any international tournaments.
- 7 November –
  - Former footballer Joey Barton is found guilty of six counts of sending "grossly offensive" social media posts aimed at broadcaster Jeremy Vine and television pundits Lucy Ward and Eni Aluko.
  - Teenager Corey Cooper, who had only passed his driving test the day before killing his passenger and friend, is sentenced to five years in prison.
  - The UK government announces £1.5bn of funding to build social housing in West and South Yorkshire.
  - Lindsay Sandiford, who in 2013, was sentenced to death in Indonesia following her conviction for drug smuggling, arrives back in the UK after being repatriated.
- 8 November –
  - A man is charged with attempted murder after a woman, subsequently named as Katie Fox, was stabbed in Birmingham City Centre the previous evening. The charge is upgraded to murder following her death in hospital on 10 November.
  - Several hundred protestors attend a demonstration against plans to accommodate asylum seekers at a military base in Crowborough, Sussex.
- 12 November – Andy Osborn, a Cambridgeshire County Council member, elected to represent Reform UK, is under investigation for describing children in care as "downright evil" at a council meeting in June.
- 13 November –
  - The UK government confirms that no-fault evictions will be banned in England from 1 May 2026.
  - Sarah Taylor, the Norfolk Police and Crime Commissioner, resigns from the Labour Party following the UK government's decision to scrap her role, citing a lack of consultation in the matter.
- 15 November –
  - A 20-year-old woman dies after getting into trouble while kayaking on the River Tees at Barnard Castle, County Durham.
  - Two boys are arrested after disorder breaks out in Bolton town centre.
- 16 November – Horninglow and Eton Parish Council has asked Staffordshire County Councillor Peter Mason, elected in May 2025 to represent Reform UK, to stay away from its meetings after old social media posts came to light. In response, Mason says he "regrets his choice of words" in the posts, which concerned black women and the police.
- 18 November – The South West Wildcat Project announce plans to return wildcats to the South West of England by releasing 50 European wildcats into the wild in Devon by 2028.
- 19 November – Authorities in Chile have named Victoria Bond, of Cornwall, as one of five people who died during a snowstorm in Chilean Patagonia.
- 20 November – At a hearing at Warwick Crown Court, Afghan national Ahmad Mulakhil pleads guilty to raping a 12-year-old girl in Nuneaton.
- 21 November –
  - At a hearing at Portsmouth Crown Court, Martin Suter is sentenced to life imprisonment with a minimum term of 27 years and 230 days for the murder of his ex-wife, Ann Blackwood, who he killed in July 2023 after lying in wait for her at a cemetery where she had gone to visit their son's grave.
  - Major train delays are caused following a signal failure in Staffordshire.
- 22 November –
  - A 13-year-old girl has been arrested following the death of a woman, subsequently named as 55-year-old Sarah Forrester, at a property in Swindon the previous evening. The girl is subsequently released on bail.
  - The first saplings grown from the Sycamore Gap tree are planted in Coventry and Staffordshire.
- 24 November – A 16-year-old boy receives serious injuries after being shot in Sheffield.
- 28 November –
  - At the Old Bailey, Peter Augustine is sentenced to life imprisonment with a minimum term of 23 years for the murder of 87-year-old John Mackey outside a Co-op store in north London on 6 May.
  - At a hearing at Leeds Crown Court, Albanian national Emirjon Gjuta, who re-entered the UK for a third time after twice being deported within three years, is sentenced to 14 months in custody.
- 29 November – The Office of Rail and Road announces that a daily Avanti West Coast train service from Manchester Piccadilly to London Euston will run without any passengers for around five months starting in mid-December. The 07:00 from Manchester will operate exclusively for train staff. The decision is reversed two days later following a public backlash.

=== December ===
- 1 December –
  - The British Medical Association announces that resident doctors will stage a five-day strike from 17 to 22 December.
  - Birmingham bin strike: Agency workers brought in to collect refuse during the strike begin industrial action themselves over a separate dispute.
  - A 16-year-old girl is killed in a crash between a car and a bus in Tadcaster, North Yorkshire.
- 3 December –
  - At Wood Green Crown Court, former nursery worker Vincent Chan pleads guilty to 26 charges of sexually abusing children in his charge.
  - Thirty children are treated by paramedics after a double decker bus has its roof ripped off by a low bridge in Wigan.
  - Reform UK launches an investigation into the online activity of Ian Cooper, the leader of Staffordshire County Council, following allegations he posted racist comments online.
- 5 December – Reform UK removes Ian Cooper, leader of Staffordshire County Council, from the party following an investigation into online racist comments.
- 6 December – Humberside Police express their concern for the welfare of two men who are believed to have entered a river to evade capture during a chase the previous evening.
- 8 December –
  - Dorset Police announce the deaths of two people in a car crash near Badbury Rings.
  - At a hearing at Warwick Crown Court, two Afghan teenagers are sentenced to nine years and ten months and ten years and eight months respectively for the rape of a 15-year-old girl in Leamington Spa in May 2025. Both had pleaded guilty to the charges at an earlier hearing.
  - American Joshua Michals, a student at Goldsmiths University, is found guilty of the murder of his on-off girlfriend and fellow student Zhe Wang, at her flat in Manor Park, Lewisham, in March 2024.
- 9 December – Ian Cooper resigns as leader of Staffordshire County Council after he was expelled by Reform UK. He will remain as an independent councillor for Tamworth. Martin Murray is appointed as temporary leader of Staffordshire County Council to replace him.
- 10 December –
  - The UK government offers the British Medical Association a new deal that includes a rapid expansion of specialist training posts as well as covering out-of-pocket expenses such as exam fees. The BMA says it will put the offer to its members.
  - Sharaz Ali is found guilty of murdering his ex-girlfriend's sister and her three children after starting a house fire at their home in Bradford in August 2024.
  - A Christmas tree which had stood in the village of Shotton Colliery, County Durham, for more than a decade is cut down hours after having its lights switched on. Two people are subsequently arrested in connection with the incident a few days later.
- 11 December – A Greater Manchester Police officer and two police staff are sacked during an investigation into "non-legitimate" police contact with sex workers. A further eight officers and two staff members continue to be investigated.
- 12 December – Health Secretary Wes Streeting expresses his concern about what he describes as a "double whammy" of rising numbers of flu patients in hospitals and forthcoming strikes by resident doctors in England.
- 13 December –
  - Police are investigating the sale of a college building worth £4.6m for £1 by Peterborough City Council.
  - Three people are killed after a car overturns on the A46 between Thrussington and Sileby in Leicestershire; a woman is subsequently arrested.
  - Two teenagers are killed and a man is critical in hospital after the car they were travelling in hit a tree near Rotherham, South Yorkshire.
- 15 December –
  - The British Medical Association says its members have voted to reject a new offer from the UK government, meaning the resident doctors' strike in England scheduled for 17 December will go ahead.
  - Police begin a murder investigation after a nine-year-old girl, later identified as Aria Thorpe, is found dead with stab wounds at a house in Weston-Super-Mare. A 15-year-old boy is subsequently charged over the incident.
- 16 December –
  - The UK government issues a Special Development Order to allow the construction of the first Universal Studios theme park in the UK near Kempston Hardwick, Bedfordshire.
  - The UK government announces plans to improve access to NHS dental services in England, with patients needing urgent or complex treatment having priority.
- 17 December –
  - Doctors across England begin a five-day strike over pay and training. The Prime Minister calls the action "dangerous and utterly irresponsible" amid the surge in flu cases.
  - The UK government announces plans to train teachers in England to recognise and tackle misogyny in schools.
- 19 December –
  - Following a trial at the Old Bailey, Anthony Gilheaney, who drove into a number of people in a drink-fuelled rampage in London on Christmas Day 2024, killing one pedestrian, is convicted of murder.
  - Police launch a murder investigation following the fatal shooting of a man, later named as Simon Whyte, at a property in Brent, north west London.
  - At a hearing at Lincoln Crown Court, Jonathan Stocks is sentenced to nine years in prison for raping a sleeping woman at a caravan park in May 2023, while his former partner, Kimberley Jowle, who encouraged him in the act, is sentenced to five years in prison.
- 20 December –
  - Police have launched a murder investigation following the fatal stabbing of a 40-year-old man at a flat in Maida Vale, north west London, the previous evening.
  - Napier Barracks, a former military site in Folkestone, Kent, which was used to house asylum seekers, has closed, the Home Office says.
- 21 December –
  - The Independent Office for Police Conduct says it may investigate West Midlands Police over its handling of the decision to ban Maccabi Tel Aviv fans from attending a match against Aston Villa F.C..
  - A 30-year-old man is arrested on suspicion of causing death by dangerous driving following a crash involving a Tesla in Oxted, Surrey which killed two teenage men. A third teenager is critical in hospital.
- 22 December –
  - A man is charged along with five others with a number of sexual offences against his wife over a 13-year period. He is remanded in custody at a magistrates; hearing the following day.
  - At a hearing at Bristol Crown Court, prolific cowboy builder Mark Killick, who defrauded 37 customers out of a collective £1.25m, is sentenced to 14 years in prison.
  - A fatberg estimated to weigh 100 tonnes is discovered by Thames Water workers in sewers beneath Whitechapel in London.
- 23 December – Two men are found guilty of plotting a gun attack against Manchester's Jewish community.
- 24 December –
  - A number of outdoor swimming events in Devon and Cornwall due to be held on Christmas Day and Boxing Day are either postponed or cancelled following a yellow weather warning for high winds.
  - A woman in her 20s is killed in a crash on the A2 near Faversham in Kent.
- 25 December –
  - The UK Health Security Agency issues a yellow health warning for cold weather in south west England, which is in force from 6pm in Christmas Day until 27 December.
  - Two men go missing during a Christmas Day swim at Budleigh Salterton in Devon. A coastguard search is carried out, but ends several hours later without locating them.
  - The main train outs between Leeds and York closes for 32 days for engineering works.
- 26 December –
  - Boxing Day train hunts take place in Yorkshire and Lincolnshire despite the UK government announcing that the sport is to be banned.
- 28 December –
  - With a snap of colder weather set to greet the new year, the UK Health Security Agency issues amber health warnings for north east and north west England effective from 6pm on 28 December until 5 January.
  - Essex Police are called to Hanningfield Reservoir near Chelmsford after a light plane crashes into the water.
- 29 December –
  - The 2026 New Year Honours are announced.
  - A woman and her two children who were injured in a Boxing Day fire at their home in Stroud, Gloucestershire, have died in hospital.
- 30 December –
  - Five people are injured in an attack at Newton Community Hospital in Merseyside.
  - Three men are arrested in Kent after an elderly pedestrian died after being hit by a car and carried on top of it for as much as a mile.
  - The investigation into the disappearance of Simon Parkes is ended after 39 years.
  - The singer Chico appears at court and denies drink driving.

== Holidays ==
- 1 January – New Year's Day
- 18 April – Good Friday
- 21 April – Easter Monday
- 5 May – Early May bank holiday
- 26 May – Spring May Bank Holiday
- 25 August – Summer Bank Holiday
- 25 December – Christmas Day
- 26 December – Boxing Day

== Deaths ==
=== January ===
- 2 January – Russ North, 59, English heavy metal singer (Cloven Hoof).
- 9 January – Laurie Holloway, 86, English pianist, musical director and composer.
- 11 January – Dame Dove Hepburn, 45, British-Egyptian musician and editor, (Epic Rap Battles of History editor)
- 13 January –
  - Tony Book, 90, English football player (Bath City, Manchester City) and manager (Manchester City).
  - Elgar Howarth, 89, English conductor, composer and trumpeter.
- 14 January – John Blakemore, 88, English photographer.
- 15 January – Diane Langton, 80, English actress (Hollyoaks, Only Fools and Horses, EastEnders).
- 16 January – Dame Joan Plowright, 95, English actress (Enchanted April, A Taste of Honey, 101 Dalmatians), Tony winner (1961).
- 18 January – Claire van Kampen, 71, English composer (Royal Shakespeare Company), playwright and theatre director, cancer.
- 20 January – John Sykes, 65, English guitarist (Tygers of Pan Tang, Whitesnake) and songwriter ("Is This Love"), cancer. (death announced on this date)
- 21 January – Dennis Crompton, 90, English architect.
- 24 January – David Gaskell, 84, English footballer (Manchester United, Wrexham, Wigan Athletic).

=== February ===
- 1 February – Peter Bassano, 79–80, English trombonist ("Hey Jude") and conductor.
- 3 February – Mark Dyczkowski, 73, English Indologist. (death announced on this date)
- 4 February – Brian Scrivens, 87, English dual-code rugby player (Newport RFC, Wigan). (death announced on this date)
- 6 February – Gordon Marshall, 85, English-Scottish footballer (Heart of Midlothian, Newcastle United, Arbroath). (death announced on this date)
- 7 February – Mick Walker, 84, English football player and manager (Notts County).
- 10 February – John Tudor, 78, English footballer (Newcastle United, Sheffield United, Coventry City), complications from dementia. (death announced on this date)
- 11 February – Graham Richards, 85, English chemist.
- 13 February – Ronnie Boyce, 82, English footballer (West Ham United).
- 16 February – Barry Panter, politician (Mayor of Newcastle-under-Lyme), car crash. (death reported on this date)
- 18 February –
  - Rick Buckler, 69, English drummer (the Jam).
  - Peter Line, 94, English lawn bowler.
- 25 February – Simon Lindley, 76, English organist, choirmaster, conductor and composer
- 27 February – Christopher Hughes, 77, English professional quizzer (Eggheads). (death announced on this date)
- 28 February – Tuppy Owens, 80, English human rights and sexual health activist, therapist, consultant, campaigner, writer and adult model.

=== March ===
- 1 March – Joey Molland, 77, English songwriter, guitarist (Badfinger)
- 3 March – Dennis Bond, 77, English footballer (Watford, Charlton Athletic, Tottenham Hotspur). (death announced on this date)
- 4 March –
  - Bill Dare, 64, English television producer and writer (Dead Ringers, The Now Show, Spitting Image). (death announced on this date)
  - Peter Eyre, 85, English cricketer (Derbyshire). (death announced on this date)
- 6 March – Brian James, 70, English punk rock guitarist (The Damned, The Lords of the New Church) and songwriter ("New Rose").
- 8 March – Ray Snowball, 92, English footballer (Darlington). (death announced on this date)
- 9 March – Simon Fisher-Becker, 63, English actor (Puppy Love, Harry Potter and the Philosopher's Stone, Doctor Who).
- 11 March – Brian Waites, 85, English golfer. (death announced on this date)
- 12 March – Steve Fleet, 87, English football player (Wrexham, Stockport County) and manager (ÍBV). (death announced on this date)
- 16 March –
  - Jonathan Durham, 59, English footballer (Torquay United, Rotherham United). (death announced on this date)
  - Doug Laughton, 80, English rugby league player (Widnes, Lancashire, Great Britain national team) and coach. (death announced on this date)* 17 March – Colin McFadyean, 82, English rugby union player (Moseley, national team, British Lions). (death announced on this date)
- 24 March – Alan Cuckston, 85, English harpsichordist, pianist, conductor, and lecturer
- 27 March – Peter Lever, 84, English cricketer (Lancashire, Tasmania, national team). (death announced on this date)
- 31 March – Betty Webb, 101, English code breaker.

=== April ===
- 2 April – Johnny King, 92, English footballer (Crewe Alexandra, Stoke City, Cardiff City).
- 3 April – Andy Wharton, 63, English footballer (Burnley, Torquay United, Chester City). (death announced on this date)
- 5 April –
  - Dave Allen, 69, English bassist (Gang of Four, Shriekback, King Swamp).
  - Corrin Brooks-Meade, 37, English-born Montserratian footballer (Alki Larnaca, Nea Salamis, Montserrat national team).
  - Roy Daines, 102, RAF veteran (No. 192 Squadron RAF, World War II). (death announced on this date)
- 7 April – Derek Whitehead, 81, English rugby league footballer (Warrington, Lancashire, national team). (death announced on this date)
- 11 April – Mike Berry, 82, English singer ("The Sunshine of Your Smile") and actor (Are You Being Served?, Worzel Gummidge).
- 15 April – Carlton Fairweather, 63, English football player (Wimbledon, Bromley) and manager (Sunderland Women), pancreatic cancer.
- 16 April – Bill Aitken, 90, Scottish-born Indian travel writer, complications from a fall.
- 17 April – Joe Thompson, 36, English footballer (Rochdale, Tranmere Rovers, Southport), lymphoma.
- 19 April – Barry Hoban, 85, English Olympic racing cyclist (1960).
- 25 April – Philip Lowrie, 88, English actor (Coronation Street, Victoria Wood, Home Fires).
- 27 April – Wizz Jones, 86, English acoustic guitarist and singer-songwriter.
- 29 April – Jane Gardam, 96, English author (The Queen of the Tambourine, Old Filth, God on the Rocks). (death announced on this date)
- 30 April – Peter Burridge, 91, English footballer (Millwall, Crystal Palace, Charlton Athletic).

=== May ===
- 1 May – David Woodfield, 81, English football player (Wolverhampton Wanderers, Watford) and manager (Sabah). (death announced on this date)
- 3 May – Ken Hancock, 87, English football player (Port Vale, Ipswich Town) and manager (Leek Town). (death announced on this date)
- 4 May – Tom Youngs, 45, English footballer (Cambridge United, Northampton Town, Bury), complications from multiple sclerosis.
- 7 May – Ronald Corp, 74, English composer and conductor
- 10 May
  - Matthew Best, 68, English conductor and singer.
  - Gerry Francis, 91, English footballer (Tonbridge Angels, Leeds United, York City).
- 11 May –
  - Colin Booth, 90, English footballer (Doncaster Rovers, Nottingham Forest, Wolverhampton Wanderers).
  - Aidan Chambers, 90, English author (Postcards from No Man's Land).
- 13 May
  - Derek Hallas, 90–91, English dual-code rugby player (Keighley, Parramatta Eels, Great Britain national team).
  - Charles Phythian-Adams, 87, English historian.
- 14 May – Chic Bates, 75, English football player (Shrewsbury Town, Swindon Town) and manager (Stoke City). (death announced on this date)
- 15 May – Robert Brooke, 85, English cricket writer.
- 17 May – Jackie Edwards, 85, English rugby league player (Warrington, Lancashire).
- 20 May – Alec Farrall, 89, English footballer (Everton, Gillingham, Watford).
- 21 May – Billy Williams, 95, English cinematographer (Women in Love, On Golden Pond, Gandhi), Oscar winner (1983).
- 22 May – Georgia O'Connor, 25, English boxer, cancer. (death announced on this date)
- 24 May – Gary Pierce, 74, English footballer (Wolverhampton Wanderers, Barnsley, Blackpool).

=== June ===
- 2 June – Colin Jerwood, 63, English punk singer (Conflict).
- 4 June – Harry Kelleher, 96, English cricketer (Surrey, Northamptonshire). (death announced on this date)
- 8 June – Uriah Rennie, 65, English football referee.
- 9 June – Frederick Forsyth, 86, English novelist (The Day of the Jackal, The Odessa File, The Fourth Protocol).
- 11 June – Douglas McCarthy, 58, English musician (Nitzer Ebb).
- 13 June – Honest John Plain, 73, English guitarist and singer (The Boys).
- 16 June –
  - Dick Edwards, 82, English footballer (Aston Villa, Mansfield Town, Torquay United). (death announced on this date)
  - Kim Woodburn, 83, English television personality (How Clean Is Your House?, Celebrity Big Brother).
- 20 June – Patrick Walden, 46, English guitarist (Babyshambles).
- 21 June – David Lawrence, 61, English cricketer (Gloucestershire, national team), complications from motor neurone disease.
- 23 June – Mick Ralphs, 81, English Hall of Fame guitarist (Mott the Hoople, Bad Company) and songwriter ("Feel Like Makin' Love"), complications from a stroke. (death announced on this date)
- 27 June – Terry Miles, 88, English footballer (Port Vale).
- 28 June –
  - Wayne Larkins, 71, English cricketer (Northamptonshire, national team).
  - Tim Pollard, 61, English actor and entertainer (Robin Hood), cancer. (death announced on this date)
- 29 June – Alan Peacock, 87, English footballer (Middlesbrough, Leeds United, national team), complications from dementia.
- 30 June – Kenneth Colley, 87, English actor (Star Wars, Monty Python's Life of Brian).

=== July ===
- 2 July –
  - Charles Chadwick, 92, English novelist. (death announced on this date)
  - Gerald Harper, 96, English actor (Hadleigh, Adam Adamant Lives!, A Night to Remember).
- 3 July – Stephen Vaughan Sr., 62–63, English football club owner (Barrow, Chester City) and convicted criminal. (death announced on this date)
- 4 July – Gordon Jago, 92, English football player (Charlton Athletic) and manager (Queens Park Rangers, Dallas Sidekicks).
- 7 July – Wayne Dobson, 68, English magician.
- 9 July – Steven Rose, 87, English neuroscientist (Not in Our Genes).
- 13 July – Dave Cousins, 85, English musician (Strawbs) and songwriter ("Lay Down", "Shine on Silver Sun").
- 14 July – Paddy Summerfield, 96, English artist and poet. (death announced on this date)
- 15 July – Judy Loe, 78, English actress (Singles, Space Island One, Casualty), cancer.
- 18 July – Pasty Harris, 81, English cricketer (Middlesex, Nottinghamshire, Wellington). (death announced on this date)
- 22 July –
  - Ozzy Osbourne, 76, English musician (Black Sabbath).
  - John Palmer, 82, English musician (Family, Blossom Toes, Bakerloo). (death announced on this date)
- 23 July – Brian Owen, 80, English footballer (Watford, Colchester United, Wolverhampton Wanderers).
- 24 July – Dame Cleo Laine, 97, English jazz singer.
- 26 July – Ray French, 85, English rugby league (St. Helens, Widnes) and union (national team) player, dementia. (death announced on this date)
- 29 July –
  - Paul Mario Day, 69, English singer (Iron Maiden, More, The Sweet), cancer.
  - Mark Lazarus, 86, English footballer (QPR, Leyton Orient).
- 30 July – Alan Finney, 91, English footballer (Sheffield Wednesday, Doncaster Rovers, Alfreton Town).

=== August ===
- 2 August – Norman Eshley, 80, English actor (George and Mildred, See No Evil, Brookside), cancer.
- 4 August – James Whale, 74, English radio and television presenter.
- 5 August – Terry Reid, 75, English rock singer (Peter Jay and the Jaywalkers). (death announced on this date)
- 9 August – Ray Brooks, 86, English actor (Cathy Come Home, Big Deal, Coronation Street).
- 10 August – Biddy Baxter, 92, English television producer (Blue Peter).
- 12 August – Richard Carr, 87, English football executive (Arsenal). (death announced on this date)
- 13 August –
  - Jack Brennan, 89, English rugby league player (Blackpool Borough, Salford Red Devils, Lancashire). (death announced on this date)
  - Geoff Foulds, 85, English snooker player. (death announced on this date)
- 17 August – Terence Stamp, 87, English actor (Superman, The Adventures of Priscilla, Queen of the Desert, Billy Budd).
- 19 August – Ken Shuttleworth, 80, English cricketer (Lancashire, Leicestershire, national team). (death announced on this date)
- 25 August –
  - Gerry Harrison, 89, English football commentator. (death announced on this date)
  - Paul Johnson, 69, English footballer (Stoke City, Chester). (death announced on this date)
  - Angela Mortimer, 93, English tennis player
  - James Mosley, 89–90, English librarian and book historian.
- 26 August –
  - Akinwale Arobieke, 64, English convicted criminal.
  - David Warburton, 59, English politician.
- 29 August – Steve Thompson, 70, English football player (Lincoln City, Charlton Athletic) and manager (Lincoln City), cancer. (death announced on this date)

=== September ===
- 4 September – Barrie Thomas, 88, English footballer (Scunthorpe United, Newcastle United, Mansfield Town). (death announced on this date)
- 6 September – Rick Davies, 81, English musician (Supertramp), and songwriter ("Bloody Well Right", "Goodbye Stranger"), cancer.
- 7 September – Stuart Craig, 83, English production designer (Harry Potter, Gandhi, The English Patient), Oscar winner (1983, 1989, 1997), complications from Parkinson's disease.
- 10 September –
  - Mark Hine, 61, English footballer (Darlington, Peterborough United, Doncaster Rovers).
  - Roy Parnell, 81, English footballer (Tranmere Rovers, Bury, Everton).
- 11 September – Viv Prince, 84, English drummer (Pretty Things). (death announced on this date)
- 13 September – Stephen Luscombe, 70, English musician (Blancmange) and songwriter ("Living on the Ceiling", "Don't Tell Me").
- 14 September –
  - Sir Nicholas Grimshaw, 85, English architect.
  - Ricky Hatton, 46, English professional boxer.
- 15 September – John Jameson, 84, English cricketer (Warwickshire, national team). (death announced on this date)
- 20 September – Matt Beard, 47, English football manager (Burnley F.C. Women, Liverpool F.C. Women).
- 21 September – John Stapleton, 79, English broadcaster (Nationwide, Watchdog) and journalist (ITV), complications from Parkinson's disease and pneumonia.
- 22 September – Dickie Bird, 92, English cricket player (Yorkshire, Leicestershire) and umpire.
- 23 September – Danny Thompson, 86, English bassist (Pentangle, Alexis Korner's Blues Incorporated).
- 25 September – Billy Vigar, 21, English footballer (Chichester City), brain injury.
- 26 September –
  - Tony Harrison, 88, English poet ("V").
  - Ken Houghton, 85, English football player (Rotherham United, Hull City, Scunthorpe United) and manager.
- 27 September – Martin Neary, 85, English organist and choral conductor (Westminster Abbey, Winchester Cathedral), complications from Parkinson's disease.
- 29 September –
  - Patrick Murray, 68, English actor (Only Fools and Horses, Scum, Quadrophenia), lung cancer.
  - Brian Patten, 79, English poet and author.

=== October ===
- 1 October – Dame Jane Goodall, 91, English zoologist and primatologist, founder of the Jane Goodall Institute and Roots & Shoots.
- 2 October – Chris Dreja, 79, English Hall of Fame guitarist (The Yardbirds). (death announced on this date)
- 3 October – Dame Patricia Routledge, 96, English Actress and singer (Keeping Up Appearances, Talking Heads, Hetty Wainthropp Investigates, Coronation Street, Victoria Wood: As Seen on TV).
- 4 October – Paul Mosley, 58, English criminal convicted for his role in the 2012 Derby arson attack.
- 5 October – Dame Jilly Cooper, 88, English author (Emily, Octavia, Rutshire Chronicles), fall.
- 6 October
  - Mick Harrison, 79, English rugby league player (Leeds, Hull F.C., national team). (death announced on this date)
  - Ben Lewis, 46, English-born Australian actor (Love Never Dies, The Phantom of the Opera), bowel cancer.
  - John Woodvine, 96, English actor (An American Werewolf in London, Z-Cars, Doctor Who).
- 7 October –
  - Sir John Gurdon, 92, English biologist, Nobel Prize laureate (2012). (death announced on this date)
  - Alan Hawley, 79, English footballer (Brentford, Wimbledon). (death announced on this date)
- 8 October – Ace Finchum, 62, British drummer (Tigertailz, Marseille, Tokyo Blade). (death announced on this date)
- 10 October – John Lodge, 82, English Hall of Fame musician (The Moody Blues) and songwriter ("I'm Just a Singer (In a Rock and Roll Band)", "Gemini Dream").
- 13 October –
  - Tony Caunter, 88, English actor (EastEnders, Queenie’s Castle, Juliet Bravo).
  - Matt Tolfrey, 44, English DJ, producer and record label owner. (death announced on this date)
- 15 October – Samantha Eggar, 86, English-American actress (The Collector, Doctor Dolittle, The Brood).
- 18 October – Lady Annabel Goldsmith, 91, English socialite, namesake of Annabel's.
- 22 October – David Ball, 66, English musician (Soft Cell, The Grid).
- 23 October –
  - Mick McNeil, 85, English footballer (Middlesbrough, Ipswich Town, national team). (death announced on this date)
  - David Wilde, 90, English pianist.
- 27 October –
  - Marvin Brown, 42, English footballer (Bristol City, Weston-super-Mare, Salisbury City), bile duct cancer.
  - Prunella Scales, 93, English actress (Fawlty Towers, A Question of Attribution, Howards End).
- 30 October –
  - Peter Watkins, 90, English filmmaker (The War Game, Punishment Park, Resan).
  - Alan Vest, 86, English-born New Zealand football player (Perth Azzurri, New Zealand national team) and manager (Sarawak FA).
- 31 October – Colin Addison, 85, English football player (Nottingham Forest, Sheffield United) and manager (Hereford United). (death announced on this date)

=== November ===
- 3 November – Richard Sharp, 87, English rugby union player (Barbarians, national team, British & Irish Lions).
- 4 November – Stuart Boam, 77, English football player (Mansfield Town, Middlesbrough, Newcastle United) and manager. (death announced on this date)
- 5 November –
  - Pauline Collins, 85, English actress (Shirley Valentine, Upstairs, Downstairs, Doctor Who), complications from Parkinson's disease.
  - Gilson Lavis, 74, English drummer (Squeeze, Jools Holland and his Rhythm & Blues Orchestra).
- 8 November – Quentin Willson, 68, English television presenter (Britain's Worst Driver, Top Gear, Fifth Gear) and motoring journalist, lung cancer.
- 10 November
  - Richard Darbyshire, 65, English singer and songwriter (Living in a Box).
  - Barry Knight, 87, English cricketer (Essex, Leicestershire, national team).
- 11 November – Susanna Gross, English journalist and bridge player.
- 20 November – Mani, 63, English rock bassist (The Stone Roses, Primal Scream). (death announced on this date)
- 21 November – Roly Howard, 90, English football manager (Marine).
- 24 November –
  - Thomas McMahon, 89, English Roman Catholic prelate, bishop of Brentwood (1980–2014).
  - Jack Shepherd, 85, English actor (Wycliffe, Bill Brand, Wonderland).
- 25 November – Johnny Newman, 91, English football player (Plymouth, Exeter) and manager (Grimsby). (death announced on this date)
- 26 November – Les O'Neill, 81, English football player (Darlington, Carlisle United) and manager (Workington).
- 30 November – Billy Bonds, 79, English footballer (West Ham United, Charlton Athletic).

=== December ===
- 1 December – Denis Durnian, 75, English golfer. (death announced on this date)
- 2 December – Marvin Hinton, 85, English footballer (Charlton Athletic, Chelsea).
- 8 December – Kate Allsop, 71, British politician, mayor of Mansfield (2015–2019). (death announced on this date)
- 9 December – David Best, 82, English footballer (Bournemouth, Ipswich, Oldham). (death announced on this date)
- 10 December – Sophie Kinsella, 55, English novelist (Shopaholic, Can You Keep a Secret?, The Undomestic Goddess), glioblastoma.
- 11 December – Stan Brookes, 72, English footballer (Doncaster Rovers).
- 13 December – Gary Rowell, 68, English footballer (Sunderland, Middlesbrough, Burnley) and newspaper columnist, leukaemia.
- 17 December –
  - Sir Patrick McNair-Wilson, 96, English politician, MP (1964–1966, 1968–1997). (death announced on this date)
  - Antony Price, 80, English fashion designer. (death announced on this date)
- 19 December –
  - Mick Abrahams, 82, English guitarist and singer (Jethro Tull, Blodwyn Pig).
  - Lorraine Cheshire, 65, English actress (Trollied, Ackley Bridge, The Imaginarium of Doctor Parnassus).
- 20 December – Henry Moore, 102, English Anglican clergyman, bishop of Cyprus and the Gulf (1981–1986). (death announced on this date)
- 21 December – Anne Madden, 93, English-born Irish painter.
- 22 December –
  - John P. Connolly, 75, English businessman.
  - Jonathan Hawkins, 42, English chess grandmaster.
  - Chris Rea, 74, singer and guitarist.
  - Robin Turner, 70, English footballer (Ipswich Town, Swansea City). (death announced on this date)
- 23 December – Allan Gilliver, 81, English footballer (Bradford City, Brighton & Hove Albion, Lincoln City), complications from dementia.
- 24 December –
  - Perry Bamonte, 65, English Hall of Fame rock musician (The Cure, Love Amongst Ruin).
  - Ken White, 82, English muralist and illustrator.
- 28 December – Tony Bond, 72, English rugby union player (Broughton Park, Sale, national team). (death announced on this date)
- 29 December – Gordon Jones, 82, English footballer (Middlesbrough, Darlington).
