= 2025 World Boxing Championships – Women's 60 kg =

Competition at amateur boxing tournament

Women's 60 kg at the 2025 World Boxing Championships
- Venue: Liverpool Arena
- Location: Liverpool, England
- Dates: 6–14 September
- Competitors: 29 from 29 nations

Medalists
gold medal	Rebeca Santos	Brazil
silver medal	Aneta Rygielska	Poland
bronze medal	Viktoriya Grafeyeva	Kazakhstan
bronze medal	Yang Chengyu	China

The Women's 60 kg competition at the 2025 World Boxing Championships was held from 6 to 14 September 2025.

== Results ==
=== Final ===
Final; 14 September
Rebeca Santos (BRA)	3
Aneta Rygielska (POL)	2

=== Top half ===
Preliminaries; 6 September
Ragad Al-Naimi (KSA)
Riza Pasuit (PHI)	RSC
Camila Camilo (COL)	3
Josefien Betist (SLE)	2
Vladislava Kukhta (HUN)	2
Sara Beram (CRO)	3
Rebecca Nicoli (ITA)	5
Ana Starovoitova (LTU)	0
Sitora Turdibekova (UZB)	5
Tetiana Dovhal (UKR)	0
Lucy Kings-Wheatley (ENG)	RSC
Chloe Rasquart (BEL)
Donjeta Sadiku (KOS)	2
Viktoriya Grafeyeva (KAZ)	3

Round of 16; 9 September
Rebeca Santos (BRA)	5
Riza Pasuit (PHI)	0
Camila Camilo (COL)	WO
Sara Beram (CRO)
Rebecca Nicoli (ITA)	0
Sitora Turdibekova (UZB)	5
Lucy Kings-Wheatley (ENG)	0
Viktoriya Grafeyeva (KAZ)	5

Quarter-finals; 10 September
Rebeca Santos (BRA)	5
Camila Camilo (COL)	0
Sitora Turdibekova (UZB)	1
Viktoriya Grafeyeva (KAZ)	4

Semi-finals; 12 September
Rebeca Santos (BRA)	4
Viktoriya Grafeyeva (KAZ)	1

=== Bottom half ===
Preliminaries; 6 September
Zara Breslin (IRL)	0
Gizem Özer (TUR)	5
Aneta Rygielska (POL)	5
Sanju Khatri (IND)	0
Miroslava Jedináková (SVK)	0
Jajaira Gonzalez (USA)	4
Monkhoryn Namuun (MGL)	0
Yang Chengyu (CHN)	5
Niamh Mitchell (SCO)	0
Maud van der Toorn (NED)	4
Krisandy Rios (VEN)	5
Barbora Maxová (CZE)	0

Round of 16; 9 September
Ayaka Taguchi (JPN)	WO
Gizem Özer (TUR)
Aneta Rygielska (POL)	5
Jajaira Gonzalez (USA)	0
Yang Chengyu (CHN)	5
Maud van der Toorn (NED)	0
Krisandy Rios (VEN)	0
Oh Yeon-ji (KOR)	5

Quarter-finals; 10 September
Ayaka Taguchi (JPN)	0
Aneta Rygielska (POL)	5
Yang Chengyu (CHN)	5
Oh Yeon-ji (KOR)	0

Semi-finals; 12 September
Aneta Rygielska (POL)	3
Yang Chengyu (CHN)	2
