= 2026 European Boxing Championships – Women's 60 kg =

Women's 60 kg at the 2026 European Boxing Championships
- Venue: Asics Arena
- Location: Sofia, Bulgaria
- Dates: 18–25 September
- Competitors: 17 from 17 nations

Medalists
gold medal	Kristina Kuluhova	Serbia
silver medal	Sthélyne Grosy	France
bronze medal	Gizem Özer	Turkey
bronze medal	Donjeta Sadiku	Kosovo

The women's 60 kg competition at the 2026 European Boxing Championships was held from 18 to 25 September 2026.

== Results ==
=== Final ===
Final; 25 September
(France) Sthélyne Grosy	1
(Serbia) Kristina Kuluhova	4

=== Top half ===
Round of 32; 18 September
(Turkey) Gizem Özer	RSC
(Sweden) Berevan Hassan

Round of 16; 21 September
(Poland) Aneta Rygielska	1
(Turkey) Gizem Özer	4
(Czech Republic) Barbora Maxová	4
(Lithuania) Ana Starovoitova	1
(France) Sthélyne Grosy	4
(Republic of Ireland) Kellie McLoughlin	1
(Greece) Olga Papadatou	0
(England) Amy Broadhurst	5

Quarterfinals; 23 September
(Turkey) Gizem Özer	5
(Czech Republic) Barbora Maxová	0
(France) Sthélyne Grosy	4
(England) Amy Broadhurst	1

Semifinals; 24 September
(Turkey) Gizem Özer	2
(France) Sthélyne Grosy	3

=== Bottom half ===
Round of 16; 21 September
(Serbia) Kristina Kuluhova	RSC
(Slovakia) Miroslava Jedináková
(Ukraine) Tetiana Dovhal	5
(Portugal) Beatriz Almeida	0
(Russia) Alina Pushkar	0
(Kosovo) Donjeta Sadiku	5
(Spain) Laura Galano	0
(Netherlands) Maud van der Toorn	5

Quarterfinals; 23 September
(Serbia) Kristina Kuluhova	5
(Ukraine) Tetiana Dovhal	0
(Kosovo) Donjeta Sadiku	5
(Netherlands) Maud van der Toorn	0

Semifinals; 24 September
(Serbia) Kristina Kuluhova	4
(Kosovo) Donjeta Sadiku	1
