= Boxing at the 2023 European Games – Women's lightweight =

Women's lightweight boxing at the 2023 European Games
- Venue: Nowy Targ Arena
- Location: Nowy Targ, Poland
- Dates: 23 June – 1 July
- Competitors: 24 from 24 nations

Medalists
gold medal	Kellie Harrington	Ireland
silver medal	Natalia Shadrina	Serbia
bronze medal	Estelle Mossely	France
bronze medal	Gizem Özer	Turkey

The women's lightweight boxing event at the 2023 European Games was held between 23 June and 1 July 2023.

== Results ==
=== Finals ===
Semi-finals
Kellie Harrington (IRL)	5
Estelle Mossely (FRA)	0
Gizem Özer (TUR)	1
Natalia Shadrina (SRB)	4

Final
Kellie Harrington (IRL)	5
Natalia Shadrina (SRB)	0

=== Top half ===
==== Section 1 ====
Round of 32
Kellie Harrington (IRL)	4
Miroslava Jedináková (SVK)	1
Agnes Alexiusson (SWE)	5
Lenka Bernardová (CZE)	0

Round of 16
Elida Kocharyan (ARM)	0
Kellie Harrington (IRL)	5
Agnes Alexiusson (SWE)	5
Sandra Kruk (POL)	0

Quarterfinals
Kellie Harrington (IRL)	4
Agnes Alexiusson (SWE)	1

==== Section 2 ====
Round of 32
Estelle Mossely (FRA)	5
Teresa Mäkinen (FIN)	0
Donjeta Sadiku (KOS)	4
Shona Whitwell (GBR)	0

Round of 16
Chelsey Heijnen (NED)	0
Estelle Mossely (FRA)	5
Donjeta Sadiku (KOS)	4
Anna Jenni (SUI)	1

Quarterfinals
Estelle Mossely (FRA)	4
Donjeta Sadiku (KOS)	1

=== Bottom half ===
==== Section 3 ====
Round of 32
Tara Bohatjuk (BIH)	0
Hanna Okhrei (UKR)	5
Gizem Özer (TUR)	5
Cristina Chiper (MDA)	0

Round of 16
Nayara Arroyo (ESP)	1
Hanna Okhrei (UKR)	4
Gizem Özer (TUR)	4
Ana Starovoitova (LTU)	0

Quarterfinals
Hanna Okhrei (UKR)	0
Gizem Özer (TUR)	5

==== Section 4 ====
Round of 32
Sara Beram (CRO)	5
Lena Büchner (GER)	0
Alessia Mesiano (ITA)	5
Loredana Marin (ROU)	0

Round of 16
Aslahan Mehmedova (BUL)	0
Sara Beram (CRO)	4
Alessia Mesiano (ITA)	0
Natalia Shadrina (SRB)	5

Quarterfinals
Sara Beram (CRO)	0
Natalia Shadrina (SRB)	5
