= 2022 Women's European Amateur Boxing Championships =

Boxing competitions

- Venue: Mediterranean Sport Center
- Location: Budva, Montenegro
- Dates: 14–22 October
- Competitors: 154 from 30 nations

The 2022 Women’s European Boxing Championships were held in the Budva, Montenegro from 14 to 22 October 2022.

== Schedule ==
Date	Round
14–17 October 2022	Preliminaries
18–19 October 2022	Quarterfinals
21 October 2022	Semifinals
22 October 2022	Finals

== Medal table ==
* Host nation (Montenegro)

Rank	Nation	Gold	Silver	Bronze	Total
1	Ireland	3	2	2	7
2	Ukraine	3	1	2	6
3	Bulgaria	1	2	1	4
4	Italy	1	1	3	5
5	Armenia	1	0	2	3
5	Turkey	1	0	2	3
7	Lithuania	1	0	1	2
8	Germany	1	0	0	1
9	Poland	0	3	0	3
10	Azerbaijan	0	1	1	2
10	Montenegro*	0	1	1	2
12	Czech Republic	0	1	0	1
13	Croatia	0	0	1	1
13	England	0	0	1	1
13	Finland	0	0	1	1
13	Greece	0	0	1	1
13	Hungary	0	0	1	1
13	Kosovo	0	0	1	1
13	Moldova	0	0	1	1
13	Serbia	0	0	1	1
13	Sweden	0	0	1	1
Totals (21 entries)		12	12	24	48

== Medal winners ==
Event	Gold	Silver	Bronze
Minimumweight (–48 kg)	Sevda Asenova; Bulgaria	Roberta Bonatti; Italy	Shannon Sweeney; Ireland
Minimumweight (–48 kg)	Sevda Asenova; Bulgaria	Roberta Bonatti; Italy	Demie-Jade Resztan; England
Light flyweight (–50 kg)	Buse Naz Çakıroğlu; Turkey	Caitlin Fryers; Ireland	Giordana Sorrentino; Italy
Light flyweight (–50 kg)	Buse Naz Çakıroğlu; Turkey	Caitlin Fryers; Ireland	Anakhanim Ismayilova; Azerbaijan
Flyweight (–52 kg)	Tetyana Kob; Ukraine	Venelina Poptoleva; Bulgaria	Olena Savchuk; Italy
Flyweight (–52 kg)	Tetyana Kob; Ukraine	Venelina Poptoleva; Bulgaria	Emma Jokiaho; Finland
Bantamweight (–54 kg)	Anastasiia Kovalchuk; Ukraine	Bojana Gojković; Montenegro	Stanimira Petrova; Bulgaria
Bantamweight (–54 kg)	Anastasiia Kovalchuk; Ukraine	Bojana Gojković; Montenegro	Ekaterina Sycheva; Armenia
Featherweight (–57 kg)	Irma Testa; Italy	Svetlana Staneva; Bulgaria	Michaela Walsh; Ireland
Featherweight (–57 kg)	Irma Testa; Italy	Svetlana Staneva; Bulgaria	Olga Papadatou; Greece
Lightweight (–60 kg)	Kellie Harrington; Ireland	Lenka Bernardová; Czech Republic	Donjeta Sadiku; Kosovo
Lightweight (–60 kg)	Kellie Harrington; Ireland	Lenka Bernardová; Czech Republic	Ana Starovoitova; Lithuania
Light welterweight (–63 kg)	Amy Broadhurst; Ireland	Mariia Bova; Ukraine	Sara Beram; Croatia
Light welterweight (–63 kg)	Amy Broadhurst; Ireland	Mariia Bova; Ukraine	Sona Harutyunyan; Armenia
Welterweight (–66 kg)	Stefanie von Berge; Germany	Aneta Rygielska; Poland	Jelena Janićijević; Serbia
Welterweight (–66 kg)	Stefanie von Berge; Germany	Aneta Rygielska; Poland	Busenaz Sürmeneli; Turkey
Light middleweight (–70 kg)	Ani Hovsepyan; Armenia	Christina Desmond; Ireland	Tamara Radunović; Montenegro
Light middleweight (–70 kg)	Ani Hovsepyan; Armenia	Christina Desmond; Ireland	Melissa Gemini; Italy
Middleweight (–75 kg)	Aoife O'Rourke; Ireland	Elżbieta Wójcik; Poland	Love Holgersson; Sweden
Middleweight (–75 kg)	Aoife O'Rourke; Ireland	Elżbieta Wójcik; Poland	Anastasiia Chernokolenko; Ukraine
Light heavyweight (–81 kg)	Gabrielė Stonkutė; Lithuania	Martyna Jancelewicz; Poland	Raisa Piskun; Ukraine
Light heavyweight (–81 kg)	Gabrielė Stonkutė; Lithuania	Martyna Jancelewicz; Poland	Tímea Nagy; Hungary
Heavyweight (+81 kg)	Mariia Lovchynska; Ukraine	Aynur Rzayeva; Azerbaijan	Şennur Demir; Turkey
Heavyweight (+81 kg)	Mariia Lovchynska; Ukraine	Aynur Rzayeva; Azerbaijan	Daria Kozorez; Moldova

== Participating nations ==
154 boxers from 30 countries registered to compete at the 2022 European Championships.

Nation	Women												Total
Nation	48kg	50kg	52kg	54kg	57kg	60kg	63kg	66kg	70kg	75kg	81kg	81+kg	Total
Armenia	Yes	Yes		Yes	Yes	Yes	Yes		Yes				7
Azerbaijan	Yes	Yes	Yes					Yes				Yes	5
Bulgaria	Yes	Yes	Yes	Yes	Yes	Yes							6
Croatia					Yes		Yes						2
Czech Republic			Yes	Yes	Yes	Yes					Yes		5
Denmark					Yes								1
England	Yes	Yes		Yes	Yes	Yes		Yes					6
Finland	Yes	Yes	Yes	Yes	Yes	Yes	Yes						7
France		Yes	Yes		Yes	Yes		Yes					5
Georgia				Yes	Yes		Yes						3
Germany		Yes		Yes		Yes		Yes		Yes			5
Greece			Yes	Yes	Yes	Yes				Yes			5
Hungary	Yes		Yes	Yes	Yes				Yes		Yes	Yes	7
Ireland	Yes	Yes	Yes	Yes	Yes	Yes	Yes	Yes	Yes	Yes			10
Italy	Yes	Yes	Yes	Yes	Yes	Yes	Yes		Yes	Yes			9
Kosovo						Yes							1
Lithuania						Yes		Yes		Yes	Yes		4
Moldova				Yes		Yes						Yes	3
Montenegro				Yes					Yes				2
Netherlands					Yes		Yes						2
Poland	Yes	Yes		Yes	Yes	Yes		Yes	Yes	Yes	Yes		9
Romania	Yes		Yes	Yes	Yes	Yes							5
Serbia	Yes			Yes		Yes	Yes	Yes	Yes				6
Slovakia	Yes						Yes					Yes	3
Spain	Yes	Yes	Yes	Yes	Yes							Yes	6
Sweden		Yes		Yes		Yes	Yes		Yes	Yes			6
Switzerland						Yes	Yes						2
Turkey	Yes	Yes		Yes		Yes	Yes	Yes		Yes	Yes	Yes	9
Ukraine	Yes	Yes	Yes	Yes	Yes	Yes	Yes	Yes	Yes	Yes	Yes	Yes	12
Wales								Yes					1
Total (30 entries)	15	14	12	20	18	20	13	11	9	9	6	7	154
