= Rebeca Santos (boxer) =

Brazilian boxer (born 2000)

Personal information
- Nationality: Brazilian
- Born: 16 September 2000 (age 25) Rio de Janeiro, Brazil

Boxing career
- Reach: 1.65 m (65 in)
Medal record
Women's amateur boxing
Representing Brazil
World Championships
Gold medal – first place	2025 Liverpool	60 kg

Rebeca de Lima Santos (born 16 September 2000) is a Brazilian boxer who competes in the lightweight division. She is a gold medalist at the World Boxing Championships.

Santos competed in the 60 kg category of the 2025 World Boxing Championships held in Liverpool, England. She defeated Riza Pasuit in the round of 16, Camila Camilo in the quarterfinals and Viktoriya Grafeyeva in the semifinals. In the final match, she defeated Aneta Rygielska 3–2.
