= 2025 IBA Women's World Boxing Championships – Lightweight =

Lightweight at the 2025 IBA Women's World Boxing Championships
- Venue: Sportski centar Čair
- Location: Niš, Serbia
- Dates: 9–14 March (preliminaries/semifinals); 16 March (final)
- Competitors: 20 from 20 nations

Medalists
gold medal	Nune Asatryan	Russia
silver medal	Viktoriya Grafeyeva	Kazakhstan
bronze medal	Natalia Šadrina	Serbia
bronze medal	Miroslava Jedináková	Slovakia

The Lightweight competition at the 2025 IBA Women's World Boxing Championships was held from 9 to 16 March 2025.

== Results ==
=== Finals ===
Semi-finals
(Serbia) Natalia Šadrina	1
(Kazakhstan) Viktoriya Grafeyeva	4
(Russia) Nune Asatryan	RSC
(Slovakia) Miroslava Jedináková

Final
(Kazakhstan) Viktoriya Grafeyeva	0
(Russia) Nune Asatryan	5

=== Top half ===
==== Section 1 ====
Round of 32
(Romania) Claudia Nechita	0
(Armenia) Elida Kocharyan	5

Round of 16
(Serbia) Natalia Šadrina	5
(Armenia) Elida Kocharyan	0
(Latvia) Anna Sorokina	0
(Sierra Leone) Josefien Betist	5

Quarterfinals
(Serbia) Natalia Šadrina	5
(Sierra Leone) Josefien Betist	0

==== Section 2 ====
Round of 32
(Vietnam) Ngô Thị Mai Chúc	w/o
(Ethiopia) Milion Cherba

Round of 16
(Kazakhstan) Viktoriya Grafeyeva	5
(Greece) Sofia Legaki	0
(Vietnam) Ngô Thị Mai Chúc	0
(Uzbekistan) Sitora Turdibekova	4

Quarterfinals
(Kazakhstan) Viktoriya Grafeyeva	5
(Uzbekistan) Sitora Turdibekova	0

=== Bottom half ===
==== Section 3 ====
Round of 32
(North Korea) Won Un-gyong	5
(Venezuela) Krisandy Ríos	0

Round of 16
(Russia) Nune Asatryan	5
(North Korea) Won Un-gyong	0
(Bulgaria) Svetlana Staneva	4
(China) Li Qiange	1

Quarterfinals
(Russia) Nune Asatryan	4
(Bulgaria) Svetlana Staneva	1

==== Section 4 ====
Round of 32
(South Africa) Esona Peter
(Tajikistan) Shoira Zulkaynarova	w/o

Round of 16
(Slovakia) Miroslava Jedináková	5
(Kenya) Emily Juma	0
(Tajikistan) Shoira Zulkaynarova	0
(Turkey) Gizem Özer	5

Quarterfinals
(Slovakia) Miroslava Jedináková	4
(Turkey) Gizem Özer	1
