= Katelynn Phelan =

Irish boxer (born 2000)

Personal information
- Nationality: Irish
- Born: 22 May 2000 (age 26)
- Weight: Welterweight

Boxing career
- Stance: Orthodox

Boxing record
- Total fights: 5
- Wins: 5
- Win by KO: 1
- Losses: 0
Medal record
Women's amateur boxing
Representing Ireland
Youth Women's World Championships
Bronze medal – third place	2017 Guwahati	Light-welterweight

Katelynn Phelan (born 22 May 2000) is an Irish professional boxer who has held the WBC Youth female and WIBA welterweight titles since October 2020. As an amateur she won a bronze medal at the 2017 Youth Women's World Championships.

== Professional career ==
Phelan made her professional debut on 30 March 2019, scoring a four-round points decision (PTS) victory against Monika Antonik at the National Stadium in Dublin, Ireland.

After scoring two more wins, both by PTS, she faced Jessica Schadko for the vacant WIBA, WBC Youth female, and WBF female welterweight titles on 17 October 2020 at the CPI Box Club in Donauwörth, Germany. After five one sided rounds, Schadko's corner called a halt to the contest before the start of the round six, handing Phelan a fifth-round stoppage victory via corner retirement (RTD).

Her first fight of 2021 was a unanimous decision (UD) victory against Karina Kopinska on 20 March, in Dudelange, Luxembourg.

== Professional boxing record ==
5 fights	5 wins	0 losses
By knockout	1	0
By decision	4	0

No.	Result	Record	Opponent	Type	Round, time	Date	Location	Notes
5	Win	5–0	(Poland) Karina Kopinska	UD	8	20 Mar 2021	Centre Sportif du LNBD annexe Alliance, Dudelange, Luxembourg	
4	Win	4–0	(Germany) Jessica Schadko	RTD	5 (10), 2:00	17 Oct 2020	CPI Box Club, Donauwörth, Germany	Won vacant WIBA, WBC Youth female, and WBF female welterweight titles
3	Win	3–0	(Bulgaria) Borislava Goranova	PTS	4	1 Feb 2020	(Republic of Ireland) Devenish Complex, Belfast, Ireland	
2	Win	2–0	(Bulgaria) Galina Gyumliyska	PTS	4	20 Jul 2019	(Republic of Ireland) Neptune Sports Park, Cork, Ireland	
1	Win	1–0	(Poland) Monika Antonik	PTS	4	30 Mar 2019	(Republic of Ireland) National Stadium, Dublin, Ireland	
