= The Man in the Wooden Hat =

2009 novel by Jane Gardam

- Author: Jane Gardam
- Language: English
- Genre: Tragicomedy
- Publisher: Chatto & Windus
- Publication date: 2009
- Publication place: England
- Pages: 224
- ISBN: 9780701177980
- Preceded by: Old Filth
- Followed by: Last Friends

The Man in the Wooden Hat is a 2009 novel by British author Jane Gardam, the second in the Old Filth trilogy. It tells the story of married couple Sir Edward Feathers QC and Elizabeth (Betty) Feathers (née Macintosh) as they juggle their lives between post-war London, the English countryside, and Hong Kong.

== Themes ==
Set across continents and spanning decades, The Man in the Wooden Hat explores the inner life of Betty Feathers as she evolves from a spirited young woman to established society figure. Examining the experience of British expatriates in the second half of the twentieth century, Gardam's novel captures the complexities of duty, displacement, and cultural privilege in the fading days of the British Empire. The topics of childlessness and infidelity are also addressed.

== Critical reception ==
The New York Times found The Man in the Wooden Hat to be a funny and affecting novel that stands well on its own, but reveals new depths when read alongside Old Filth, enriching the original story. Kirkus Reviews describes the novel as subtle, intelligent, and emotionally resonant, illuminating Old Filth with Betty's insight and grace.
