= Yang Chengyu =

Chinese boxer (born 1995)

Personal information
- Nationality: Chinese
- Born: 1995 (age 30–31) Honghuagang, Zunyi, Guizhou, China

Boxing career
- Weight class: Light welterweight

Boxing record
- Total fights: 10
- Wins: 8
- Win by KO: 0
- Losses: 2
- Draws: 0
- No contests: 0
Medal record
Women's amateur boxing
Representing China
World Championships
Bronze medal – third place	2025 Liverpool	60 kg
AIBA World Championships
Gold medal – first place	2023 New Delhi	Light welterweight

Yang Chengyu (born 1995) is a Chinese boxer.

She won a gold medal at the 2023 AIBA Women's World Boxing Championships.
