= Viktoriya Grafeyeva =

Kazakhstani boxer (born 2001)

Personal information
- Nationality: Kazakhstani
- Born: 9 July 2001 (age 25) Almaty, Kazakhstan

Boxing career
Medal record
Women's amateur boxing
Representing Kazakhstan
World Championships
Bronze medal – third place	2025 Liverpool	60 kg
IBA World Championships
Silver medal – second place	2025 Niš	Lightweight
Asian Championships
Gold medal – first place	2024 Chiang Mai	Lightweight

Viktoriya Grafeyeva (born 9 July 2001) is a Kazakhstani boxer who competes in the lightweight division. She won the gold medal at the Asian Championships in 2024. In 2025, she won the silver medal at the IBA World Championships and a bronze medal at the World Boxing Championships.

== Amateur career ==
Grafeyeva began boxing at the age of 17, having previously competed in athletics.

In 2024, she won the gold medal at the Asian Championships held in Chiang Mai, Thailand, defeating Chinese boxer Li Qiange in the final.

Grafayeva competed at the 2025 IBA Women's World Boxing Championships in Niš, Serbia, where she won a silver medal, losing to Nune Asatryan in the gold medal match.

Grafeyeva competed in the 60 kg category of the 2025 World Boxing Championships held in Liverpool, England. She defeated Donjeta Sadiku in their opening bout, Lucy Kings-Wheatley in the round of 16, and Sitora Turdibekova in the quarterfinals. She would lose to Rebeca Santos in the semifinals.
