= 2023 IBA Women's World Boxing Championships – Light welterweight =

Light welterweight at the 2023 IBA Women's World Boxing Championships
- Venue: K. D. Jadhav Indoor Hall
- Location: New Delhi, India
- Dates: 17–25 March
- Competitors: 23 from 23 nations

Medalists
gold medal	Yang Chengyu	China
silver medal	Nataliya Sychugova	Russia
bronze medal	Camila Camilo	Colombia
bronze medal	Fatia Benmessahel	France

The Light welterweight competition at the 2023 IBA Women's World Boxing Championships was held between 17 and 25 March 2023.

== Results ==
=== Finals ===
Semi-finals
(Colombia) Camila Camilo	1
(Russia) Nataliya Sychugova	4
(China) Yang Chengyu	5
(France) Fatia Benmessahel	0

Final
(Russia) Nataliya Sychugova	1
(China) Yang Chengyu	4

=== Top half ===
==== Section 1 ====
Round of 32
(Colombia) Camila Camilo	RSC
(Kuwait) Noura Al-Mutair

Round of 16
(Italy) Assunta Canfora
(Colombia) Camila Camilo	KO
(Chinese Taipei) Su Ching-wen	5
(Armenia) Sona Harutyunyan	0

Quarterfinals
(Colombia) Camila Camilo	4
(Chinese Taipei) Su Ching-wen	1

==== Section 2 ====
Round of 32
(Vietnam) Thị Linh Hà	1
(Thailand) Somnuek Thananya	4
(Guyana) Alesha Jackman
(Uzbekistan) Khadichabonu Abdullaeva	RSC

Round of 16
(Russia) Nataliya Sychugova	5
(Thailand) Somnuek Thananya	2
(Uzbekistan) Khadichabonu Abdullaeva	5
(Serbia) Jelena Janićijević	0

Quarterfinals
(Russia) Nataliya Sychugova	5
(Uzbekistan) Khadichabonu Abdullaeva	0

=== Bottom half ===
==== Section 3 ====
Round of 32
(Turkey) Urguya Us	0
(China) Yang Chengyu	5
(India) Shashi Chopra	5
(Kenya) Teresia Wanjiru	0

Round of 16
(Kazakhstan) Aida Abikeyeva	0
(China) Yang Chengyu	5
(India) Shashi Chopra	0
(Japan) Mai Kito	4

Quarterfinals
(China) Yang Chengyu	5
(Japan) Mai Kito	0

==== Section 4 ====
Round of 32
(Philippines) Riza Pasuit	0
(France) Fatia Benmessahel	4
(Tajikistan) Nilufar Boboyorova	3
Megan de Cler	4

Round of 16
(Mongolia) Uranbilegiin Shinetsetseg	0
(France) Fatia Benmessahel	5
Megan de Cler	1
(Mexico) Altagracia Solís	4

Quarterfinals
(France) Fatia Benmessahel	5
(Mexico) Altagracia Solís	2
