= Caitlin Fryers =

Irish boxer (born 1998)

Personal information
- Nationality: Ireland, Northern Ireland
- Born: 28 November 1998 (age 27) Belfast, Northern Ireland

Boxing career
Medal record
Women's amateur boxing
Representing Ireland
European Championships
Silver medal – second place	2022 Budva	Light flyweight
Youth World Championships
Bronze medal – third place	2017 Guwahati	Light flyweight

Caitlin Fryers is a boxer who represents Ireland and Northern Ireland. She competed in the 2022 Women's European Amateur Boxing Championships, winning the silver medal in the light flyweight event. She also competed at the 2017 AIBA Youth Women's World Boxing Championships and 2022 European U22 Boxing Championships.
