= 2017 AIBA Youth Women's World Boxing Championships =

Boxing competitions

- Location: Guwahati, India
- Dates: 19–26 November
- Competitors: 160 from 31 nations

The 2017 AIBA Youth Women's World Boxing Championships were held in Guwahati, India, from 19 to 26 November 2017. The competition is under the supervision of the world's governing body for amateur boxing AIBA and is the junior version of the World Amateur Boxing Championships. Boxers aged between 17 and 18 as of 1 January 2017 were eligible to compete.

== Medal winners ==
Event	Gold	Silver	Bronze
Light flyweight (–48 kg)	Nitu Ghanghas; India	Zhazira Urakbayeva; Kazakhstan	Nie Yuan; China Caitlin Fryers; Ireland
Flyweight (–51 kg)	Jyoti Gulia; India	Ekaterina Molchanova; Russia	Zhansaya Abdraimova; Kazakhstan Rinka Kinoshita; Japan
Bantamweight (–54 kg)	Sakshi Chaudhary; India	Ivy Jane Smith; England	Sena Irie; Japan Isamary Aquino; United States
Featherweight (–57 kg)	Shashi Chopra; India	Đỗ Hồng Ngọc; Vietnam	Monkhoryn Namuun; Mongolia Hu Cailling; China
Lightweight (–60 kg)	Im Ae-ji; South Korea	Vittoria De Carlo; Italy	Ella Boot; Australia Zhansaya Baltabekova; Kazakhstan
Light welterweight (–64 kg)	Ankushita Boro; India	Ekaterina Dynnik; Russia	Thanchanok Saksri; Thailand Katelynn Phelan; Ireland
Welterweight (–69 kg)	Citlalli Ortiz; United States	Nataliya Sychugova; Russia	Alina Popp; Germany Canser Oltu; Turkey
Middleweight (–75 kg)	Anastasiia Shamonova; Russia	Georgia O'Connor; England	Natalia Marczykowska; Poland Yang Ya-chu; Chinese Taipei
Light heavyweight (–81 kg)	Arailym Begdilda; Kazakhstan	Anastasiia Rybak; Russia	Yelyzaveta Sliusar; Ukraine Anupama Kundu; India
Heavyweight (+81 kg)	Kristina Tkacheva; Russia	Dina Islambekova; Kazakhstan	Sueda Şahin; Turkey Neha Yadav; India

== Medal table ==
* Host nation (India)

Rank	Nation	Gold	Silver	Bronze	Total
1	India*	5	0	2	7
2	Russia	2	4	0	6
3	Kazakhstan	1	2	2	5
4	United States	1	0	1	2
5	South Korea	1	0	0	1
6	England	0	2	0	2
7	Italy	0	1	0	1
7	Vietnam	0	1	0	1
9	China	0	0	2	2
9	Ireland	0	0	2	2
9	Japan	0	0	2	2
9	Turkey	0	0	2	2
13	Australia	0	0	1	1
13	Chinese Taipei	0	0	1	1
13	Germany	0	0	1	1
13	Mongolia	0	0	1	1
13	Poland	0	0	1	1
13	Thailand	0	0	1	1
13	Ukraine	0	0	1	1
Totals (19 entries)		10	10	20	40

== Participating nations ==
160 athletes from 31 nations competed.

- Australia (7)
- Bulgaria (4)
- China (6)
- Chinese Taipei (6)
- England (6)
- France (4)
- Germany (6)
- Hungary (6)
- India (10)
- Ireland (8)
- Italy (5)
- Japan (4)
- Kazakhstan (10)
- Kosovo (1)
- Mongolia (6)
- Nepal (4)
- Netherlands (1)
- New Zealand (2)
- Philippines (2)
- Poland (6)
- Russia (10)
- Scotland (2)
- South Korea (2)
- Sri Lanka (2)
- Tajikistan (4)
- Thailand (4)
- Turkey (7)
- Ukraine (10)
- United States (8)
- Uzbekistan (6)
- Vietnam (1)

== See also ==
- AIBA Youth World Boxing Championships
