= Georgia O'Connor =

English boxer (2000–2025)

Personal information
- Born: 18 February 2000 Durham, England
- Died: 22 May 2025 (aged 25)
- Weight: Light-middleweight
- Spouse: Adriano Cardinali (m. 2025)

Boxing career
- Stance: Orthodox

Boxing record
- Total fights: 3
- Wins: 3
- Win by KO: 0
Medal record
Women's amateur boxing
Representing England
Youth World Championships
Silver medal – second place	2017 Guwahati	Middleweight
Bronze medal – third place	2018 Budapest	Middleweight
Commonwealth Youth Games
Gold medal – first place	2017 Nassau	Middleweight

Georgia Ann Cardinali (née O'Connor; 18 February 2000 – 22 May 2025) was an English professional boxer who began her career with an undefeated streak after turning professional in 2021. As an amateur, she earned multiple international medals, including gold at the 2017 Commonwealth Youth Games and podium finishes at the Youth World and European Championships.

== Early life and education ==
O'Connor lived in France for a brief period as a child and was a fluent French speaker. She was a black belt and five time national champion in Taekwondo as well as being undefeated in kickboxing. She studied for a degree in civil engineering and played the guitar and sang in her spare time.

== Amateur career ==
As an amateur, she won a gold medal at the 2017 Commonwealth Youth Games, silver at the 2017 Youth World Championships and bronze at the 2018 Youth World Championships. She also reached the quarter-finals at the 2018 European Youth Championships after winning bronze and silver medals as a junior in previous editions of the tournament.

== Professional career ==
She turned professional in 2021 and won all three of her fights in the paid ranks.

== Professional boxing record ==
3 fights	3 wins	0 losses
By decision	3	0

No.	Result	Record	Opponent	Type	Round, time	Date	Location	Notes
3	Win	3–0	Joyce Van Ee	PTS	4	15 Oct 2022	The O2 Arena, London, England	
2	Win	2–0	Erica Alvarez	PTS	6	2 Apr 2022	Newcastle Arena, Newcastle, England	
1	Win	1–0	Ester Konecna	PTS	6	16 Oct 2021	Newcastle Arena, Newcastle, England	

== Personal life ==
O'Connor married Adriano Cardinali on 9 May 2025.

== Death ==
O'Connor suffered from ulcerative colitis and primary sclerosing cholangitis, and was diagnosed with cancer in January 2025. She died from cancer on 22 May 2025, at the age of 25. Prior to her cancer diagnosis in January 2025, O'Connor said that "not one doctor took me seriously."
