= Old Filth =

2004 novel by Jane Gardam

- Author: Jane Gardam
- Language: English
- Genre: Tragicomedy
- Publisher: Chatto & Windus
- Publication date: 2004
- Publication place: England
- Pages: 320
- ISBN: 9780349139494
- Followed by: The Man in the Wooden Hat

Old Filth is a novel by English author Jane Gardam, published in 2004 by Chatto & Windus. A tragicomedy, the story focuses on a retired judge struggling to come to terms with the death of his wife. It was shortlisted for the 2005 Women's Prize for Fiction.

== Summary ==
Sir Edward Feathers is a retired judge of the Inner Temple, recently widowed and living in Dorset. Feathers looks back over the story of his life, from his early years in the British Raj to his legal career.

== Reception ==
Globally, the work was received generally well with Complete Review saying on the consensus "Very impressed, and some think it's brilliant". The Independent praised Gardam's ability to create "humorous and touching" characters and sharp dialogue, comparing the novel favourably to Paul Scott's Staying On. But the review also stated that the narrative was sometimes confusing.

The Guardian said the novel was "Gardam's masterpiece" and commended the novel's ability to create interest in unappealing topics.

The New York Times suggested Old Filth had the potential to improve Gardam's popularity in the United States.

In 2015, a BBC survey of literary critics from outside the UK ranked Old Filth among the 100 greatest British novels.

== Awards ==
Old Filth was shortlisted for the Women's Prize for Fiction in 2005.
