= God on the Rocks =

Book by Jane Gardam

First edition (publ. Hamish Hamilton)

God on the Rocks is a novel written by Jane Gardam and published in 1978.

== Plot ==
The book is set in a small seaside resort in the north east of England and starts in 1936. God on the Rocks takes place in a madhouse, a convalescent home for artists. It includes a pastor who likes to preach near the ocean, a Great War survivor, an ancient character and others. The main character, Margaret Marsh, is an eight-year-old who hides in the garden and listens to the conversations of the painters, gardeners and crazy people. She takes day trips to the shore to get away from her mother and new baby brother. Here she meets Charles and his sister Binkie. She hears stories of her mother's youth from them and the book shows the world through Margaret's eyes, as a child and as an adult.

== Book reviews ==
The New York Times book review said, "We are in the hands of a master story-teller. Over the course of the novel, Gardam gives us the past and present of her characters’ lives, zooming in and out of their diverse perspectives, moving from Margaret’s uncorrupted eyes to the more freighted vision of the grown-ups around her."

The Mary Whipple review said, "Though this is one of Jane Gardam’s early novels, written in 1978 and recently reprinted by Europa Editions, it is in many ways, more light-hearted and more memorable than some of her more famous later novels."

Kirkus Reviews said, "As usual, Gardam requires very few pages to delineate an entire world of class-ridden prejudice and the blighting effect it has on every character. Yet each one is so achingly vulnerable, and depicted with such empathy, that it’s a relief to be reminded in a final chapter set 12 years later that people are surprisingly resilient and can make the best of even the most unpromising circumstances."

== Awards ==
The book won the Prix Baudelaire and was shortlisted for the Booker Prize in 1978.

== Adaptation ==
The novel was adapted into a 1992 television film directed by Ross Cramer, starring Bill Paterson, Sinéad Cusack, and Minnie Driver.
