= Jane Gardam =

English fiction writer and critic (1928–2025)

Jane Gardam OBE FRSL
- Born: Jean Mary Pearson; 11 July 1928; Coatham, England
- Died: 28 April 2025 (aged 96); Chipping Norton, England
- Education: Bedford College, London
- Occupations: Writer; critic
- Spouse: David Gardam (m. 1954; died 2010)
- Children: 3, including Tim
- Writing career
- Period: 1971–2014
- Genres: Children's fiction; Adult fiction
- Notable works: God on the Rocks; The Queen of the Tambourine; Old Filth
- Notable awards: Phoenix Award; Booker Prize; BBC National Short Story Award

Jane Mary Gardam OBE FRSL (born Jean Mary Pearson; 11 July 1928 – 28 April 2025) was an English writer of children's and adult fiction and literary critic. She also penned reviews for The Spectator and The Telegraph and wrote for BBC Radio. She lived in Kent, Wimbledon and Yorkshire. She won numerous literary awards, including the Whitbread Award twice. She was appointed Officer of the Order of the British Empire (OBE) in the 2009 New Year Honours. She was elected a Fellow of the Royal Society of Literature in 2005.

== Biography ==
Gardam was born Jean Mary Pearson in Coatham, North Yorkshire, on 11 July 1928 to William and Kathleen Mary Pearson, and grew up in Cumberland and the North Riding of Yorkshire. Whilst at school she was inspired by a mobile all-woman theatre run by Nancy Hewins, who created She Stoops to Conquer. At the age of seventeen she won a scholarship to read English at Bedford College, London, now part of Royal Holloway, University of London (BA English, 1949).After leaving university Gardam worked in a number of literary-related jobs, starting off as a Red Cross Travelling Librarian for hospital libraries and was later a journalist. She married David Gardam QC in 1954 and they had three children, Tim, Catharine (Kitty) Nicholson, a botanical artist who died in 2011, and Tom. Her husband died in 2010.

Gardam's first book was a children's novel, A Long Way From Verona, a 13-year-old girl's first-person narrative, which was published in 1971. It won the Phoenix Award from the Children's Literature Association in 1991, which recognizes the best children's book published twenty years earlier that did not win a major award. In 1989, Gardam was on the judging panel of the (then) Whitbread Book Award, now known as the Costa Book Awards.

In her last works of fiction she explored related themes and recounted stories from different points of view in three novels: Old Filth (2004), The Man in the Wooden Hat (2009) and Last Friends (2013). One American reviewer noted that her concern with "the intricate web of manners and class peculiar to the inhabitants of her homeland" does not explain why she remains less well known to an international audience than her English contemporaries. He recommended Old Filth for its "typical excellence and compulsive readability", written by a novelist "at the top of her form". The Spectator praised The Man in the Wooden Hat for its "rich complexities of chronology, settings and characters, all manipulated with marvellous dexterity". In 2015, a BBC survey voted Old Filth among the 100 greatest British novels.

Gardam died at a care facility in Chipping Norton on 28 April 2025 at the age of 96.

== Works and recognition ==
=== Children's books ===
- Gardam, Jane (1971). A Long Way from Verona. London: Hamilton. ISBN 9780241020777.
- A Few Fair Days (1971)
- The Summer After the Funeral (1973)
- Bridget and William (1981)
- The Hollow Land (1981), received the 1983 Whitbread Children's Book Award
- Horse (1982)
- Kit (1983)
- Kit in Boots (1986)
- Swan (1987)
- Through the Doll's House Door (1987)
- Black Woolly Pony (1993)
- Tufty Bear (1996)
- The Kit Stories (1998)

=== Short story collections ===
- Black Faces, White Faces (1975), David Higham Prize for Fiction (1975), Winifred Holtby Memorial Prize (1975)
- The Sidmouth Letters (1980)
- The Pangs of Love and Other Stories (1983), Katherine Mansfield Award for 1984
- Showing the Flag and Other Stories (1989)
- Trio: Three Stories from Cheltenham (1993)
- Going into a Dark House (1994), PEN/Macmillan Silver Pen Award for 1995
- Missing the Midnight (1997)
- The Green Man (1998)
- The People on Privilege Hill (2007), nominated for the BBC National Short Story Prize
- The Stories of Jane Gardam (2014)

=== Novels ===
- Bilgewater (1977)
- God on the Rocks (1978); *Prix Baudelaire (France) (1989): nominated for The Booker Prize Best Novel (1978)
- Gardam, Jane (1985). Crusoe's Daughter. London: Hamilton. ISBN 9780241115268.
- The Queen of the Tambourine (1991); Whitbread Novel Award (1991)
- Faith Fox (1996)
- The Flight of the Maidens (2000)
- Old Filth (2004)
- The Man in the Wooden Hat (2009)
- Last Friends (2013), shortlisted for the 2014 Folio Prize

=== Non-fiction ===
- The Iron Coast (1994)
