= Nune Asatryan =

Armenian-Russian boxer (born 2001)

Personal information
- Nationality: Russian
- Born: 2001 Sarnaghbyur, Shirak Province, Armenia

Sport
- Sport: Boxing
- Weight class: Lightweight
Medal record
Women's amateur boxing
Representing Russia
IBA Women's World Boxing Championships
Gold medal – first place	2025 Niš	Lightweight
European Amateur Boxing Championships
Silver medal – second place	2024 Belgrade	Lightweight
Youth and Junior World Boxing Championships
Silver medal – second place	2018 Budapest	Lightweight
European Junior Boxing Championships
Silver medal – second place	2017 Sofia	Lightweight

Nune Asatryan is an Armenian born Russian boxer who won a gold medal in the lightweight division at the 2025 IBA Women's World Boxing Championships.

== Biography ==
Born in Sarnaghbyur, Shirak Province in Armenia, Asatryan represents Russia having relocated to Krasnodar. She won a silver medal in the lightweight division at the 2024 European Amateur Boxing Championships in Belgrade, Serbia, losing to the host nation's Natalia Shadrina on a unanimous decision in the final.

Asatryan defeated Kazakhstan's Viktoriya Grafeyeva by unanimous decision to win the lightweight final and take the gold medal at the 2025 IBA Women's World Boxing Championships in Niš, Serbia.
