= The Queen of the Tambourine =

1991 epistolary novel by Jane Gardam

- First edition
- Author: Jane Gardam
- Cover artist: Piero della Francesca - St. Julian, fresco decoration of the church of Sant'Agostino in Borgo San Sepolcro (1455-60)
- Language: English
- Publisher: Sinclair-Stevenson Ltd
- Publication date: 15 April 1991
- Publication place: United Kingdom
- Media type: Print
- Pages: 234
- Awards: Whitbread Prize for Best Novel of the Year
- ISBN: 1-85619-035-8

The Queen of the Tambourine is a 1991 epistolary novel by English author Jane Gardam; it won the Whitbread Prize for Best Novel that year.

== Plot introduction ==
Set in a wealthy Surrey suburb of South London, the novel takes the form of a series of increasingly bizarre letters written by Eliza Peabody, an interfering neighbour and hospice volunteer. The letters are written to Joan, who has left her husband and fled the country, and tell of Eliza's own marital and later mental breakdown, as the barriers between truth and fiction break down.

== Reception ==
Reviews are positive :

- Kirkus Reviews explains that the novel "sardonically traces the steady fall (or is it rise?) into madness of a suburban wife with too little to do and too many horrors to shut out of her mind...her neighbors have begun to treat her with the wary kindness one reserves for the near-psychotic, but at least she's lost her self-righteous edge. As her letters move from stilted lectures to multiple-paged flights of glorious fancy, the roots of her misery start to emerge, until all her inventions seem a perfectly rational response to the events that prefaced her destruction. A loony, funny tale and an author with a refreshing take on the familiar.
- Publishers Weekly also praises the author: "Gardam knits together antic humor, a complex narrator and a sophisticated narrative form, all the while showing an admirable trust in the reader's ability to perceive the intricate pattern she has woven."
- Anita Brookner in Spectator concludes that "The tone is unified throughout; manic delusions were never so persuasive. And it is very moving when it is not being exceedingly funny".
