= Donjeta Sadiku =

Kosovan boxer (born 1999)

Personal information
- National team: Kosovo
- Born: 8 July 1999 (age 27) Prishtina, FR Yugoslavia (now Kosovo)
- Height: 1.67 m (5 ft 6 in)

Sport
- Sport: Amateur boxing
- Weight class: Lightweight

Achievements and titles
- Olympic finals: 2020 Summer Olympics
Medal record
Women's amateur boxing
Representing Kosovo
World Championships
Bronze medal – third place	2022 Istanbul	Lightweight
EUBC European Championships
Bronze medal – third place	2022 Budva	Lightweight
European Boxing Championships
Bronze medal – third place	2026 Sofia	60 kg
Mediterranean Games
Gold medal – first place	2026 Taranto	Lightweight
Junior World Championships
Silver medal – second place	2015 Taipei	Lightweight

Donjeta Sadiku (born 8 July 1999) is a Kosovan boxer. She competed for Kosovo at the 2020 Summer Olympics in the women's lightweight event and has previously competed for the country at the 2019 European Games. Her coach is Marjola Sallauka.

== Biography ==
Donjeta Sadiku was born on 8 July 1999 in Prishtina, Kosovo. She began boxing at the age of 12, in Prishtina. Her coach is Marjola Sallauka.

== Career ==
=== 2018 Women's European Amateur Boxing Championships ===
Her first senior competition were the 2018 Women's European Amateur Boxing Championships in Sofia, Bulgaria. She received a bye into the round of 16 where she faced Polish Aneta Rygielska, finishing with a 0–5 loss by points.

=== 2018 AIBA Women's World Boxing Championships ===
In November 2018, Sadiku was set to compete in the lightweight competition at the 2018 AIBA Women's World Boxing Championships in New Delhi, India. She was denied a visa to enter the country due to India's lack of recognition of Kosovo. India was issued a warning by the International Boxing Association (AIBA) that if the decision was not reversed, the association would withdraw the 2021 AIBA World Boxing Championships from the country, originally scheduled to take place in New Delhi. Sadiku ultimately did not appear on the draw list published on 14 November 2018, and did not compete. This was her second boxing championship event impacted by a denial of entry into India, following a similar incident prior to the 2017 AIBA Youth Women's World Boxing Championships in Guwahati.

=== 2019 European Games ===
At the 2019 European Games in Minsk, Belarus, Sadiku was chosen as Kosovo's flag bearer for the opening ceremony. She participated in the Women's 60 kg boxing event, seeding against the Danish Ditte Frostholm in the round of 32. Sadiku lost the match by points, finishing 0–5.

=== 2020 Summer Olympics ===
At the 2020 European Boxing Olympic Qualification Tournament in London and Villebon-sur-Yvette, Sadiku competed in the Women's lightweight tournament. In the round of 32, she matched up against German Maya Kleinhans winning the match by points 3–2, advancing to the round of 16 where she fought Swedish Agnes Alexiusson, falling short 2–3.

On 15 June 2021, Sadiku received an invitation from the Tripartite Commission to compete in the women's lightweight boxing event for Kosovo at the 2020 Summer Olympics, which was postponed a year due to the COVID-19 pandemic. In the round of 32, she faced British Caroline Dubois; Sadiku was eliminated, losing by decision 0–5.

=== 2026 Mediterranean Games ===
At the 2026 Mediterranean Games, Sadiku won gold in the final of the boxing, where she defeated Kristina Kuluhova, representing Serbia.
