= Ani Hovsepyan =

Armenian boxer (born 1998)

Personal information
- Born: Ани Анушавановна Овсепян; 19 March 1998 (age 28) Armavir, Armenia
- Height: 176 cm (5 ft 9 in)

Sport
- Sport: Boxing
- Weight class: Light-middleweight
Medal record
Women's amateur boxing
Representing Armenia
European Amateur Boxing Championships
Gold medal – first place	2022 Budva	70kg
Bronze medal – third place	2024 Belgrade	70kg

Ani Hovsepyan (born 19 March 1998) is an Armenian boxer. She became the first female European Amateur Boxing champion from her country when she won the gold medal in the 70 kg division at the 2022 championships. Hovsepyan also won a bronze medal in the same category at the 2024 edition. In August 2025, she announced she was turning professional.
