= Gizem Özer =

Turkish boxer (born 2001)

Personal information
- Nationality: Turkish
- Born: 9 April 2001 (age 25) Elazığ, Turkey
- Weight: Lightweight

Boxing career
Medal record
Women's amateur boxing
Representing Turkey
European Games
Bronze medal – third place	2023 Kraków-Małopolska	Lightweight
EB European Championships
Bronze medal – third place	2026 Sofia	60 kg
Mediterranean Games
Bronze medal – third place	2022 Oran	Light welterweight
European U22 Championships
Silver medal – second place	2022 Poreč	Light welterweight

Gizem Özer (born 9 April 2001) is a Turkish female boxer competing in the lightweight (60 kg) division.

== Boxing career ==
Starting boxing in Elazığ in 2017, Özer, an athlete of Elazığ Belediyespor Club, continues to work under the management of national team coach Cemil Döndü. Özer, who won a silver medal at the Under-22 European Boxing Championships held in Porec, Croatia on 12–24 March, won the first place at the Universities Boxing Uni-lig Turkey Championships hosted by Balıkesir University on 31 March.

She reached the semifinals in the women's lightweight category at the 3rd European Games held at Nowy Targ Arena in Nowy Targ, Poland, beating Moldovan Cristina Chiper 5–0 in the first round, Lithuanian Ana Starovoitova 4–0 in the second round and Ukrainian Hanna Okhrei 5–0 in the quarterfinals. She lost to Serbian Natalia Shadrina 4–1 in the semifinals and won the bronze medal. She won a quota for the 2024 Summer Olympics. Özer was eliminated in her first match at the 2024 Summer Olympics, losing 4-1 to Italian Alessia Mesiano.
