= Aneta Rygielska =

Polish boxer (born 1995)

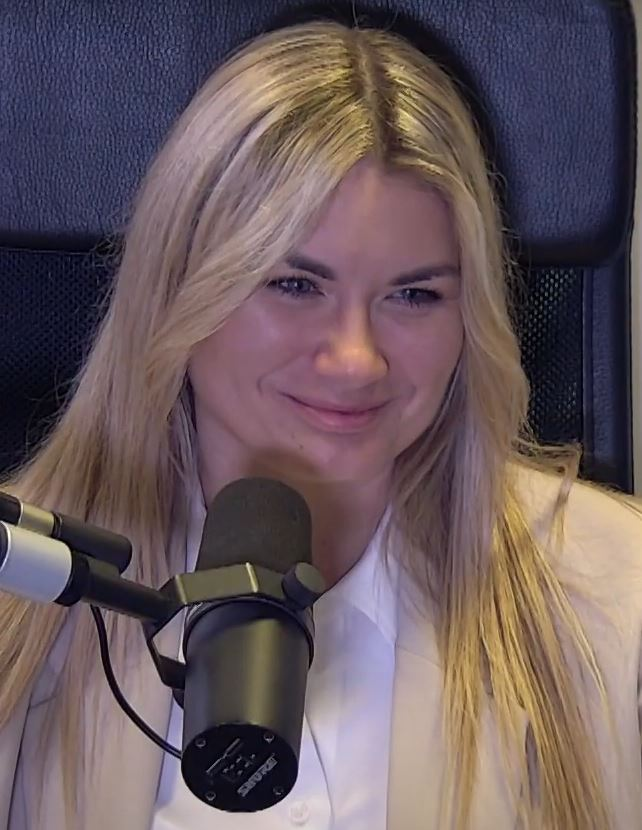
- Rygielska in 2024

Personal information
- Born: 24 August 1995 (age 31) Toruń
- Height: 170 cm (5 ft 7 in)

Sport
- Club: MKSW Pomorzanin Toruń
Medal record
Women's amateur boxing
Representing Poland
World Championships
Silver medal – second place	2025 Liverpool	60 kg
European Games
Bronze medal – third place	2015 Baku	Light welterweight
European Championships
Silver medal – second place	2019 Alcobendas	Light welterweight

Aneta Elżbieta Rygielska (born 24 August 1995 in Toruń) is a Polish boxer, European Championship silver medalist, and three-time Polish champion.

== Career ==
At the inaugural 2015 European Games in Baku, she won a bronze medal in the 64 kg category, losing in the semi-finals to Italy's Valentina Alberti.

In 2019, she became the European vice-champion in Alcobendas. In the final, she was defeated by Italy's Francesca Amato 2:3. Earlier, she eliminated Ukraine's Marija Bowa in the semi-finals.

== Results ==
Results from the Olympic Games, World Championships, European Games, and European Championships.

Year	Event	Venue	Category	Round	Opponent	Result
2014	World Championships	KOR Jeju City	57 kg	1st round	Bye	
2014	World Championships	KOR Jeju City	57 kg	2nd round	USA Tiara Brown	L 1:2
2015	2015 European Games	AZE Baku	64 kg	1st round	ROU Simona Sitar	W 3:0
2015	2015 European Games	AZE Baku	64 kg	Quarter-final	CHE Anaïs Kistler	W 2:0
2015	2015 European Games	AZE Baku	64 kg	Semi-final	ITA Valentina Alberti	L 0:3
2016	World Championships	KAZ Astana	57 kg	1st round	Bye	
2016	World Championships	KAZ Astana	57 kg	2nd round	TUR Satı Burcu	W 2:1
2016	World Championships	KAZ Astana	57 kg	Quarter-final	IND Sonia Lather	L 0:3
2016	European Championships	BGR Sofia	60 kg	1st round	Bye	
2016	European Championships	BGR Sofia	60 kg	2nd round	IRL Shauna Browne	L 0:3
2018	European Championships	BGR Sofia	60 kg	1st round	Bye	
2018	European Championships	BGR Sofia	60 kg	2nd round	KOS Donjeta Sadiku	W 5:0
2018	European Championships	BGR Sofia	60 kg	Quarter-final	FIN Mira Potkonen	L 0:5
2019	2019 European Games	BLR Minsk	60 kg	1st round	SWE Agnes Alexiusson	L 0:5
2019	European Championships	ESP Alcobendas	64 kg	1st round	NLD Chelsey Heijnen	W 5:0
2019	European Championships	ESP Alcobendas	64 kg	Quarter-final	ARM Ani Hovsepyan	W 5:0
2019	European Championships	ESP Alcobendas	64 kg	Semi-final	UKR Marija Bowa	W 3:2
2019	European Championships	ESP Alcobendas	64 kg	Final	ITA Francesca Amato	L 2:3
2019	World Championships	RUS Ulan-Ude	60 kg	1st round	Bye	
2019	World Championships	RUS Ulan-Ude	60 kg	2nd round	BLR Alla Yarshevich	W 5:0
2019	World Championships	RUS Ulan-Ude	60 kg	3rd round	IRL Amy Broadhurst	L 0:5

== Bibliography ==
- Aneta Rygielska on BoxRec
