= Ana Starovoitova =

Lithuanian boxer (born 1993)

Personal information
- Nationality: Lithuanian
- Born: 10 February 1993 (age 33) Vilnius, Lithuania
- Weight: Lightweight

Boxing career
Medal record
Women's amateur boxing
Representing Lithuania
European Championships
Bronze medal – third place	2022 Budva	Lightweight
Bronze medal – third place	2024 Belgrade	Lightweight

Ana Starovoitova (born 10 February 1993) is a Lithuanian female boxer and 2022 IBA lightweight bronze medallist at European championships. She is also an active boxing coach in Klaipėda boxing club Bokso Visata.

== Biography ==
At the 2022 IBA Women's World Boxing Championships Starovoitova lost her first match with Kiria Tapia of Puerto Rico.

At the 2022 Women's European Amateur Boxing Championships Starovoitova competed in the lightweight division. In the semifinal she lost to Czech Lenka Bernardova and was awarded bronze medal.

During 2022 Ukrainian refugee crisis, Starovoitova with her husband started a free boxing school for Ukrainian refugee children.

At the 2024 European championships, she won a bronze medal again after she forfeited her semifinal fight against Nune Asatryan from Russia as an act of support for Ukraine.
