= Ireland at the 2024 Summer Olympics =

- IOC code: IRL
- NOC: Olympic Federation of Ireland
- Website: olympics.ie

in Paris, France 24 July 2024 – 11 August 2024
- Competitors: 134 (70 men and 64 women) in 15 sports
- Flag bearers (opening): Shane Lowry & Sarah Lavin
- Flag bearers (closing): Fintan McCarthy & Mona McSharry
- Medals Ranked 19th: Gold 4 Silver 0 Bronze 3 Total 7

Summer Olympics appearances (overview)
- 1924; 1928; 1932; 1936; 1948; 1952; 1956; 1960; 1964; 1968; 1972; 1976; 1980; 1984; 1988; 1992; 1996; 2000; 2004; 2008; 2012; 2016; 2020; 2024; 2028

Other related appearances
- Great Britain (1896–1920)

Ireland competed at the 2024 Summer Olympics in Paris from 24 July to 11 August 2024, commemorating the centenary of the team's debut as an independent country at the Summer Olympics. Irish athletes have competed in every Summer Olympics edition of the modern era, either in its own right or as part of a Great Britain and Ireland team before 1924, except for the Berlin 1936 Olympics.

Ireland sent a record 134 athletes to the 2024 Games, across 15 sports. 2024 also marked the centenary of Ireland's first independent appearance at the 1924 Olympic Games, also in Paris, after the founding of the Irish Free State in 1922.

The 2024 Summer Olympics was the most successful Olympics in the history of the nation, with Ireland breaking their previous record medal haul of 6 at London 2012. The team also surpassed the Atlanta 96 record of 3 Olympics golds in a games, including both a first Olympic medal and Olympic gold medal in gymnastics as well as a first gold for the men in swimming.

== Medalists ==
Ireland guaranteed a podium finish on seven consecutive days: the opening Monday (McSharry, swimming), then Tuesday (Wiffen, swimming), followed by Wednesday (this was the day Harrington secured at least a bronze medal in boxing), then Thursday (Lynch & Doyle, rowing), followed by McCarthy and O'Donovan's gold in rowing on Friday. The streak continued on Saturday with McClenaghan's gold in gymnastics and was rounded off with Daniel Wiffen securing a second podium finish in the pool on Sunday.

The nation's media also reported on Irish links to athletes for other nations, notably Hungarian swimmer Hubert Kós (200 metre backstroke gold medalist), as well as Hong Kong's multi medal-winning swimmer Siobhán Haughey (grand-niece of former Taoiseach Charles Haughey). Neither's achievements count towards Ireland's total.

A number of Northern Ireland athletes competed for, and in several cases won gold medals for, Great Britain and Northern Ireland, including rower Hannah Scott and Jack McMillan who had previously swum for Ireland at the 2020 Games. These successes were also widely reported upon in Ireland. The success of Northern Ireland born athletes for both teams was reported on widely in Northern Ireland in particular, with the combined total of four golds, one silver and two bronze medals for Northern Irish athletes being reported as "Northern Ireland's best ever Games" and a symbol of the increasing ease felt in Northern Ireland with its multiple Irish and British identities.

Medal	Name	Sport	Event	Date
Gold	Daniel Wiffen	Swimming	Men's 800 m freestyle	30 July
Gold	Fintan McCarthy; Paul O'Donovan	Rowing	Men's lightweight double sculls	2 August
Gold	Rhys McClenaghan	Gymnastics	Men's pommel horse	3 August
Gold	Kellie Harrington	Boxing	Women's lightweight	6 August
Bronze	Mona McSharry	Swimming	Women's 100 m breaststroke	29 July
Bronze	Daire Lynch; Philip Doyle	Rowing	Men's double sculls	1 August
Bronze	Daniel Wiffen	Swimming	Men's 1500 m freestyle	4 August

Medals by sport
Sport	1st place, gold medalist(s)	2nd place, silver medalist(s)	3rd place, bronze medalist(s)	Total
Rowing	1	0	1	2
Swimming	1	0	2	3
Gymnastics	1	0	0	1
Boxing	1	0	0	1
Total	4	0	3	7

Medals by date
Date	1st place, gold medalist(s)	2nd place, silver medalist(s)	3rd place, bronze medalist(s)	Total
29 July	0	0	1	1
30 July	1	0	0	1
1 August	0	0	1	1
2 August	1	0	0	1
3 August	1	0	0	1
4 August	0	0	1	1
6 August	1	0	0	1
Total	4	0	3	7

Medals by gender
Gender	1st place, gold medalist(s)	2nd place, silver medalist(s)	3rd place, bronze medalist(s)	Total
Male	3	0	2	5
Female	1	0	1	2
Mixed	0	0	0	0
Total	4	0	3	7

Multiple medalists
Name	Sport	1st place, gold medalist(s)	2nd place, silver medalist(s)	3rd place, bronze medalist(s)	Total
Daniel Wiffen	Swimming	1	0	1	2

== Competitors ==
The following is the list of number of competitors in the Games.

Sport	Men	Women	Total
Athletics	9	15	24
Badminton	1	1	2
Boxing	4	6	10
Canoeing	2	2	4
Cycling	2	5	7
Diving	1	1	2
Equestrian	4	3	7
Field hockey	16	0	16
Golf	2	2	4
Gymnastics	1	0	1
Rowing	6	10	16
Rugby sevens	12	12	24
Sailing	3	1	4
Swimming	6	6	12
Taekwondo	1	0	1
Total	70	64	134

== Athletics ==
Irish track and field athletes achieved the entry standards for Paris 2024, either by passing the direct qualifying mark (or time for track and road races) or by world ranking, in the following events (a maximum of 3 athletes each):

Key

- Note–Ranks given for track events are within the athlete's heat only
- Q = Qualified for the next round
- q = Qualified for the next round as a fastest loser or, in field events, by position without achieving the qualifying target
- NR = National record
- N/A = Round not applicable for the event
- Bye = Athlete not required to compete in round

Track & road events

Athlete	Event	Heat		Repechage		Semifinal		Total	
Athlete	Event	Time	Rank	Time	Rank	Time	Rank	Time	Rank
Mark English	Men's 800 m	1:45.15	2 Q	Bye		1:45.97	6	Did not advance	
Andrew Coscoran	Men's 1500 m	3:42.07	15	3:39.45	12	Did not advance			
Cathal Doyle	Men's 1500 m	3:37.82	9	3:34.92	1 Q	3:33.15 PB	10	Did not advance	
Luke McCann	Men's 1500 m	3.35.73	8	3:36.50	7	Did not advance			
Brian Fay	Men's 5000 m	13:55.35	13	—N/a				Did not advance	
Sharlene Mawdsley	Women's 400 m	50.71 PB	4	51.18	3	Did not advance			
Rhasidat Adeleke	Women's 400 m	50.09	1 Q	Bye		49.95	2 Q	49.28	4
Sophie Becker	Women's 400 m	51.84	6	51.28	2	Did not advance			
Ciara Mageean	Women's 1500 m	Withdrawn due to injury							
Sophie O'Sullivan	Women's 1500 m	4:00.23 PB	7	4:03.73	4	Did not advance			
Sarah Healy	Women's 1500 m	4:02.91	7	4:07.60	4	Did not advance			
Jodie McCann	Women's 5000 m	15:55.08	20	Did not advance					
Sarah Lavin	Women's 100 m hurdles	12.73	2 Q	Bye		12.69	6	Did not advance	
Fionnuala McCormack	Women's marathon	—N/a						2:30.12 SB	28
Rhasidat Adeleke; Sharlene Mawdsley; Sophie Becker; Phil Healy; Kelly McGrory^{[h]}	Women's 4 × 400 m relay	3:25.05	3 Q	—N/a				3:19.90 NR	4
Thomas Barr; Christopher O'Donnell; Sharlene Mawdsley; Sophie Becker	Mixed 4 × 400 m relay	3:12.67	5	—N/a				Did not advance	

^{h} Athlete who participated in the heat only.

Field events

Athlete	Event	Semifinal		Final	
Athlete	Event	Result	Rank	Result	Rank
Eric Favors	Men's shot put	19.02 m	18	Did not advance	
Nicola Tuthill	Women's hammer	69.90 m	16	Did not advance	

Combined

Athlete	Event		100H	HJ	SP	200 m	LJ	JT	800 m	Final	Rank
Kate O'Connor	Women's heptathlon	Result	14.08	1.77 m SB	13.79 m	24.77 SB	5.79 m	50.36 m	2:13.25 SB	—N/a	
Kate O'Connor	Women's heptathlon	Points	967	941	780	908	786	867	918	6167	14

== Badminton ==
Ireland entered two badminton players into the Olympic tournament based on the BWF Race to Paris Rankings. The team was officially announced on 29 May 2024.

Athlete	Event	Group stage				Elimination	Quarter-final	Semi-final	Final / BM	
Athlete	Event	Opposition Score	Opposition Score	Opposition Score	Rank	Opposition Score	Opposition Score	Opposition Score	Opposition Score	Rank
Nhat Nguyen	Men's singles	Zilberman (ISR); W (21–17, 19–21, 21–13)	Dahal (NEP); W (21–7, 21–5)	Axelsen (DEN); L (21–13, 21–10)	2	Did not advance.				
Rachael Darragh	Women's singles	Stadelmann (SUI); L (21–13, 22–24, 15–21)	Marín (ESP); L (21–5, 21–5)	—N/a	3	Did not advance.				

== Boxing ==
Ireland entered ten boxers (four men and the maximum six women) into the Olympic tournament. Tokyo 2020 Olympians Michaela Walsh (women's featherweight), Aoife O'Rourke (women's middleweight), and defending champion Kellie Harrington, along with two other rookies (Dean Clancy and Jack Marley), secured the spots on the Irish squad in their respective weight divisions, either by advancing to the semifinal match or finishing in the top two, at the 2023 European Games in Nowy Targ, Poland. Joining the squad, Jude Gallagher (men's featherweight) earned a quota for himself by winning the quota bouts round, at the 2024 World Olympic Qualification Tournament 1 in Busto Arsizio, Italy. Jennifer Lehane (women's bantamweight), Daina Moorehouse (women's flyweight) and Grainne Walsh (women's welterweight) and Aidan Walsh (men's welterweight) secured their spots following their triumphs in quota bouts, at the 2024 World Olympic Qualification Tournament 2 in Bangkok, Thailand. The team was officially named on 28 June 2024. Harrington, Marley & O'Rourke were all seeded.

Men

Athlete	Event	Round of 32	Round of 16	Quarterfinals	Semifinals	Final	
Athlete	Event	Opposition Result	Opposition Result	Opposition Result	Opposition Result	Opposition Result	Rank
Jude Gallagher	57 kg	Bye	Paalam (PHI); L 0–5	Did not advance			
Dean Clancy	63.5 kg	Al-Kasbeh (JOR); L 2–3	Did not advance				
Aidan Walsh	71 kg	Traoré (FRA); L 0–4	Did not advance				
Jack Marley (7)	92 kg	—N/a	Bereźnicki (POL); W 4–0	Boltaev (TJK); L 1–4	Did not advance		

Women

Athlete	Event	Round of 32	Round of 16	Quarterfinals	Semifinals	Final	
Athlete	Event	Opposition Result	Opposition Result	Opposition Result	Opposition Result	Opposition Result	Rank
Daina Moorehouse	50 kg	Bye	Lkhadiri (FRA); L 1–4	Did not advance			
Jennifer Lehane	54 kg	Bye	Chang (CHN); L 0–5	Did not advance			
Michaela Walsh	57 kg	Bye	Staneva (BUL); L 0–5	Did not advance			
Kellie Harrington (3)	60 kg	Bye	Mesiano (ITA); W 5–0	Valdés (COL); W 5–0	Ferreira (BRA); W 4–1	Yang (CHN); W 4–1	1st place, gold medalist(s)
Grainne Walsh	66 kg	Hámori (HUN); L 1–4	Did not advance				
Aoife O'Rourke (2)	75 kg	—N/a	Wójcik (POL); L 2–3	Did not advance			

== Canoeing ==
=== Slalom ===
Ireland qualified a boat in the men's C-1 class, and men's K-1 class at the 2023 ICF Canoe Slalom World Championships in Lee Valley, London. They also qualified a boat in the women's K-1 class as a result of their result in the 2023 European Games. All slalom canoeists will also be eligible for the extreme kayak/kayak cross event.

==== Canoe slalom ====
Athlete	Event	Preliminary						Semifinal		Final	
Athlete	Event	Run 1	Rank	Run 2	Rank	Best	Rank	Time	Rank	Time	Rank
Liam Jegou	Men's C-1	102.67	17	99.93	12	99.93	16	98.52	6	98.52	7
Noel Hendrick	Men's K-1	98.64	18	90.68	12	90.68	19	102.46	15	Did not advance	
Michaela Corcoran	Women's C-1	129.55	21	168.05	21	129.55	21	Did not advance			
Madison Corcoran	Women's K-1	159.52	25	115.93	23	115.93	24	Did not advance			

==== Kayak cross ====
Athlete	Event	Time trial	Rank	Round 1	Repechage	Heat	Quarter-finals	Semi-finals	Final	
Athlete	Event	Time trial	Rank	Position	Position	Position	Position	Position	Position	Rank
Liam Jegou	Men's KX-1	70.81	18	4 RE	1 Q	3	Did not advance			22
Noel Hendrick	Men's KX-1	69.31	14	3 RE	1 Q	3	Did not advance			21
Madison Corcoran	Women's KX-1	83.49	35	4 RE	2 Q	4	Did not advance			32

== Cycling ==
=== Road ===
Ireland entered three road cyclists (two male and one female). Ireland qualified two male and one female through the UCI Nation Ranking and 2023 World Championships in Glasgow, Great Britain. Selection 19th July

Athlete	Event	Time	Rank
Ben Healy	Men's road race	6:20:54	10
Ryan Mullen	Men's road race	6:36.31	60
Ryan Mullen	Men's time trial	37:57.16	12
Megan Armitage	Women's road race	4:06:58	35

=== Track ===
A silver medal finish in the 2024 UCI Track Cycling Nations Cup event in Hong Kong ensured that the Ireland women's team pursuit team could not finish below tenth overall in the Team Pursuit world rankings, and thus guaranteed qualification in all three women's endurance events in Paris.

Pursuit

Athlete	Event	Qualification		First round		Final	
Athlete	Event	Time	Rank	Opponent Results	Rank	Opponent Results	Rank
Mia Griffin; Alice Sharpe; Kelly Murphy; Lara Gillespie	Women's team pursuit	4:12.447 NR	9	Did not advance			

Reserve: Erin Creighton

Omnium

Athlete	Event	Scratch race		Tempo race		Elimination race		Points race		Total	
Athlete	Event	Rank	Points	Rank	Points	Rank	Points	Rank	Points	Points	Rank
Lara Gillespie	Women's omnium	15	12	1	40	9	24	10	23	99	10

Madison

Athlete	Event	Points	Laps	Rank
Alice Sharpe; Lara Gillespie	Women's madison	3	0	11

== Diving ==
Main articles: Diving at the 2024 Summer Olympics and Diving at the 2024 Summer Olympics – Qualification

Jake Passmore was announced as being selected to compete for Ireland in the men's 3m Springboard on 28 June 2024.

Athlete	Event	Preliminary		Semifinal		Final	
Athlete	Event	Points	Rank	Points	Rank	Points	Rank
Jake Passmore	Men's 3 m springboard	360.90	21	Did not advance			
Ciara McGing	Women's 10 m platform	188.50	29	Did not advance			

== Equestrian ==
Ireland entered a full squad of equestrian riders each to the team eventing and jumping competitions through a top-five finish in jumping at the 2022 FEI World Championships in Herning, Denmark, and through a top-six finish at the Eventing Worlds on the same year in Pratoni del Vivaro, Italy. Ireland also entered one rider in the dressage individual events, through the establishments of final olympics ranking for Group A (North Western Europe).

=== Dressage ===
Athlete	Horse	Event	Grand Prix		Grand Prix Freestyle		Overall	
Athlete	Horse	Event	Score	Rank	Technical	Artistic	Score	Rank
Abigail Lyle	on Giraldo	Individual	60.441	37	Did not advance			

Qualification Legend: Q = Qualified for the final based on position in group; q = Qualified for the final based on overall position

=== Eventing ===
Athlete	Horse	Event	Dressage		Cross-country			Jumping						Total	
Athlete	Horse	Event	Dressage		Cross-country			Qualifier			Final			Total	
Athlete	Horse	Event	Penalties	Rank	Penalties	Total	Rank	Penalties	Total	Rank	Penalties	Total	Rank	Penalties	Rank
Susie Berry	on Wellfields Lincoln	Individual	33.00	32	15.20	48.20	36	4.00	52.20	31	Did not advance			52.20	31
Sarah Ennis	on Action Lady M	Individual	38.00	54	3.20	41.20	29	Withdrew							
Austin O'Connor	on Colorado Blue	Individual	31.70	28	Nil	31.70	14	8.00	39.70	21	0.00	39.70	17	39.70	17
Aoife Clark	on Freelance	Team Only	-	-	-	-	-	4.00	-	-	-	-	-	-	-
Susie Berry; Sarah Ennis; Austin O'Connor; Aoife Clark	See above	Team	102.70	11	18.40	121.10	8	16.00	157.10*	9	—N/a			157.10*	9

* includes penalty of 20pts for replacement

=== Jumping ===
Athlete	Horse	Event	Qualification			Final		
Athlete	Horse	Event	Penalties	Time	Rank	Penalties	Time	Rank
Cian O'Connor	on Maurice	Individual	4	75.17	33	Did not advance		
Shane Sweetnam	on James Kann Cruz	Individual	0	73.35	2	12	82.03	22
Daniel Coyle	on Legacy	Individual	0	73.64	3	N/A	N/A	Rt
Cian O'Connor; Shane Sweetnam; Daniel Coyle	See above	Team	9	230.22	6	14	235.59	7

== Field hockey ==
Summary

Key:

- FT – After full-time.
- P – Match decided by penalty-shootout.

Team	Event	Group stage						Quarterfinal	Semifinal	Final / BM	
Team	Event	Opposition Score	Opposition Score	Opposition Score	Opposition Score	Opposition Score	Rank	Opposition Score	Opposition Score	Opposition Score	Rank
Ireland men's	Men's tournament	Belgium; L 0–2	Australia; L 1–2	India; L 0–2	Argentina; L 1–2	New Zealand; W 2–1	5	Did not advance			10

=== Men's tournament ===
The Ireland men's national field hockey team qualified for the Olympics after a top three finish at the 2024 FIH Olympic Qualifiers in Valencia, Spain.

Team roster Ireland announced their squad on 24 June 2024.

Head coach: Mark Tumilty

No.	Pos.	Player	Date of birth (age)	Caps	Goals	Club
1	GK	David Harte	3 April 1988 (aged 36)	242	0	(Netherlands) SV Kampong
7	DF	Tim Cross	26 January 1991 (aged 33)	61	3	(England) Hampstead & Westminster
8	FW	John McKee	22 December 1996 (aged 27)	102	43	(Ireland) Banbridge
9	FW	Matthew Nelson	14 April 1998 (aged 26)	87	20	(Ireland) Lisnagarvey
10	DF	Daragh Walsh	27 August 1997 (aged 26)	104	8	(Belgium) Braxgata
15	DF	Kyle Marshall	10 July 1998 (aged 26)	52	0	(England) Old Georgians
16	DF	Shane O’Donoghue	24 November 1992 (aged 31)	234	222	(Ireland) Glennane
17	MF	Sean Murray (Captain)	5 May 1997 (aged 27)	140	37	(Belgium) Gantoise
19	DF	Peter McKibbin	19 March 1997 (aged 27)	48	0	(Ireland) Lisnagarvey
20	FW	Jeremy Duncan	2 August 1994 (aged 29)	117	26	(Ireland) Monkstown
22	MF	Michael Robson	18 April 1995 (aged 29)	162	17	(Ireland) Annadale
24	FW	Benjamin Walker	13 July 1999 (aged 25)	92	34	(Belgium) La Gantoise
25		Jonathan Lynch	4 May 2001 (aged 23)	42		
26	MF	Peter Brown	7 July 1994 (aged 30)	43	4	(Ireland) Banbridge
29	DF	Lee Cole	21 February 1995 (aged 29)	124	32	(Ireland) Monkstown
40	FW	Ben Johnson	1 August 2000 (aged 23)	38	10	(Ireland) Three Rock Rovers
45	DF	Nicholas Page	28 May 1997 (aged 27)	53	0	(England) Oxted

Group play

Pos	Team	Pld	W	D	L	GF	GA	GD	Pts	Qualification
1	Belgium	5	4	1	0	15	7	+8	13	Advance to quarter-finals
2	India	5	3	1	1	10	7	+3	10	Advance to quarter-finals
3	Australia	5	3	0	2	12	10	+2	9	Advance to quarter-finals
4	Argentina	5	2	2	1	8	6	+2	8	Advance to quarter-finals
5	Ireland	5	1	0	4	4	9	−5	3	
6	New Zealand	5	0	0	5	4	14	−10	0	

Source: FIH
Rules for classification: 1) points; 2) matches won; 3) goal difference; 4) goals for; 5) head-to-head result; 6) field goals scored.

27 July 2024
10:30
v

Belgium	2–0	Ireland
Boon 25'; Hendrickx 49'	Report

Pitch 2
Umpires:
Sean Rapaport (RSA)
Gabriel Labate (ARG)

29 July 2024
10:00
v

Ireland	1–2	Australia
Cole 25'	Report	Weyer 9'; Govers 30'

Pitch 1
Umpires:
Sarah Wilson (GBR)
Jonas van 't Hek (NED)

30 July 2024
13:15
v

Ireland	0–2	India
	Report	Harmanpreet 11', 19'

Pitch 2
Umpires:
Steve Rogers (AUS)
David Tomlinson (NZL)

1 August 2024
13:15
v

Argentina	2–1	Ireland
Domene 17'; Casella 28'	Report	Cole 27'

Pitch 2
Umpires:
Raghu Prasad (IND)
Marcin Grochal (POL)

2 August 2024
17:00
v

New Zealand	1–2	Ireland
Morrison 5'	Report	Walker 13'; Duncan 31'

Pitch 1
Umpires:
Ben Göntgen (GER)
Zeke Newman (AUS)

== Golf ==
Ireland entered four golfers into the Olympic tournament. In the Men's individual Rory McIlroy and Shane Lowry qualified directly for the games, based on their respective world ranking positions, on the IGF World Rankings. In the Women's individual, Leona Maguire and Stephanie Meadow represented Ireland.

Athlete	Event	Round 1	Round 2	Round 3	Round 4	Total		
Athlete	Event	Score	Score	Score	Score	Score	Par (Note: The men's event was par-71, while the women's event was par-72.)	Rank
Rory McIlroy	Men's	68	69	66	66	269	−15	T5
Shane Lowry	Men's	71	71	66	71	279	−5	T26
Stephanie Meadow	Women's	78	74	72	70	294	+6	39
Leona Maguire	Women's	78	79	83	71	311	+23	59

== Gymnastics ==
=== Artistic ===
Rhys McClenaghan achieved a quota place for Ireland at the Paris 2024 Artistic Gymnastics meet by winning gold in the pommel horse at the 2023 World Artistic Gymnastics Championships and was selected on 5 June 2024. As a pommel specialist, he is not expected to compete across all apparatus, but is entitled to do so.

Athlete	Event	Qualification		Final	
Athlete	Event	Score	Rank	Score	Rank
Rhys McClenaghan	Men's pommel horse	15.200	1 Q	15.533	1st place, gold medalist(s)

== Rowing ==
Irish rowers qualified boats in 7 events, each of the following classes through the 2023 World Rowing Championships in Belgrade, Serbia and the final Olympic Qualification Regatta in Lucerne, Switzerland. The official Irish rowing team for the 2024 Summer Olympics was named on 20 June 2024.

Men

Athlete	Event	Heats		Repechage		Semifinals		Final	
Athlete	Event	Time	Rank	Time	Rank	Time	Rank	Time	Rank
Daire Lynch; Phillip Doyle	Double sculls	6:13.24	1 SA/B	Bye		6:13.14	1 FA	6:15.17	3rd place, bronze medalist(s)
Fintan McCarthy; Paul O'Donovan	Lightweight double sculls	6:34.12	1 SA/B	Bye		6:21.88	1 FA	6:10.99	1st place, gold medalist(s)
Ross Corrigan; Nathan Timoney	Coxless pair	6:32.34	3 SA/B	Bye		6:32.22	3 FA	6:30.49	6

Women

Athlete	Event	Heats		Repechage		Semifinals		Final	
Athlete	Event	Time	Rank	Time	Rank	Time	Rank	Time	Rank
Alison Bergin; Zoe Hyde	Double sculls	6:52.61	3 SA/B	Bye		6:55.08	5 FB	6:55.62	10
Margaret Cremen; Aoife Casey	Lightweight double sculls	7:12.89	3 R	7:11.31	1 SA/B	6:59.72	3 FA	6:54.57	5
Aifric Keogh; Fiona Murtagh	Coxless pair	7:28.22	2 SA/B	Bye		7:32.92	6 FB	7:08.88	8
Emily Hegarty; Natalie Long; Eimear Lambe; Imogen Magner	Coxless four	6:51.75	3 R	6:38.10	4 FB	-		6:34.74	7

Coxless Pair Reserve: Holly Davis

Qualification Legend: FA=Final A (medal); FB=Final B (non-medal); FC=Final C (non-medal); FD=Final D (non-medal); FE=Final E (non-medal); FF=Final F (non-medal); SA/B=Semifinals A/B; SC/D=Semifinals C/D; SE/F=Semifinals E/F; QF=Quarterfinals; R=Repechage

== Rugby sevens ==
Summary

Team	Event	Pool round				Quarterfinal	Classification semifinal	Classification match	
Team	Event	Opposition Result	Opposition Result	Opposition Result	Rank	Opposition Result	Opposition Result	Opposition Result	Rank
Ireland men's	Men's tournament	South Africa; W 10–5	Japan; W 40–5	New Zealand; L 12–14	2 Q	Fiji; L 15–19	United States; W 17–14	New Zealand; L 7–17	6
Ireland women's	Women's tournament	Great Britain; L 12–21	South Africa; W 38–0	Australia; L 14–19	3 q	Australia; L 7–40	France; L 7–19	Great Britain; L 12–28	8

=== Men's tournament ===
Ireland national rugby sevens team qualified for the Olympics by winning the gold medal and securing an outright berth at the 2023 European Games in Kraków. Both squads were named on 17 June 2024.

Team roster

Ireland's squad of 12 players was named on 17 June 2024. Additionally, Sean Cribbin and Bryan Mollen were named as traveling reserves.

Head coach: James Topping

No.	Player	Date of birth (age)
1	Jack Kelly	26 October 1997 (aged 26)
2	Andrew Smith	21 July 2000 (aged 24)
3	Harry McNulty (c)	5 March 1993 (aged 31)
4	Mark Roche	25 January 1993 (aged 31)
5	Zac Ward	11 December 1998 (aged 25)
6	Chay Mullins	23 January 2002 (aged 22)
7	Jordan Conroy	10 March 1994 (aged 30)
8	Hugo Keenan	18 June 1996 (aged 28)
9	Hugo Lennox	6 March 1999 (aged 25)
10	Terry Kennedy	4 July 1996 (aged 28)
11	Gavin Mullin	29 November 1997 (aged 26)
12	Niall Comerford	6 April 2000 (aged 24)
13	Sean Cribbin	20 August 1998 (aged 25)
14	Bryan Mollen	25 September 1995 (aged 28)

Group stage

Pos	Team	Pld	W	D	L	PF	PA	PD	Pts	Qualification
1	New Zealand	3	3	0	0	71	29	+42	9	Advance to Quarter-finals
2	Ireland	3	2	0	1	62	24	+38	7	Advance to Quarter-finals
3	South Africa	3	1	0	2	59	32	+27	5	Advance to Quarter-finals
4	Japan	3	0	0	3	22	129	−107	3	

Source: World Rugby
Rules for classification: 1) Points; 2) Head-to-head result; 3) Point difference; 4) Points scored.

24 July 2024
17:30

Ireland	10–5	South Africa
Try: Conroy 8' m Kennedy 12' m	World Rugby	Try: S. Davids 14' m

Stade de France, Paris
Attendance: 69,000
Referee: Gianluca Gnecchi (Italy)

24 July 2024
21:00

Ireland	40–5	Japan
Try: Kennedy 1' c Mullins (2) 8' c, 12' c McNulty 8' c Comerford 10' m Ward 15' c Con: Lennox (3/4) 2', 8', 9'; Roche (2/2) 12', 15'	World Rugby	Try: Tsuoka 14' m

Stade de France, Paris
Attendance: 69,000
Referee: Morné Ferreira (South Africa)

25 July 2024
16:30

New Zealand	14–12	Ireland
Try: Carter 8' c McGarvey-Black 14' c Con: Rokolisoa (1/1) 8'; Knewstubb (1/1) 14'	World Rugby	Try: Ward 6' m Conroy 7' m Con: Roche (1/2) 8'

Stade de France, Paris
Attendance: 70,000
Referee: Jordan Way (Australia)

Quarter-final

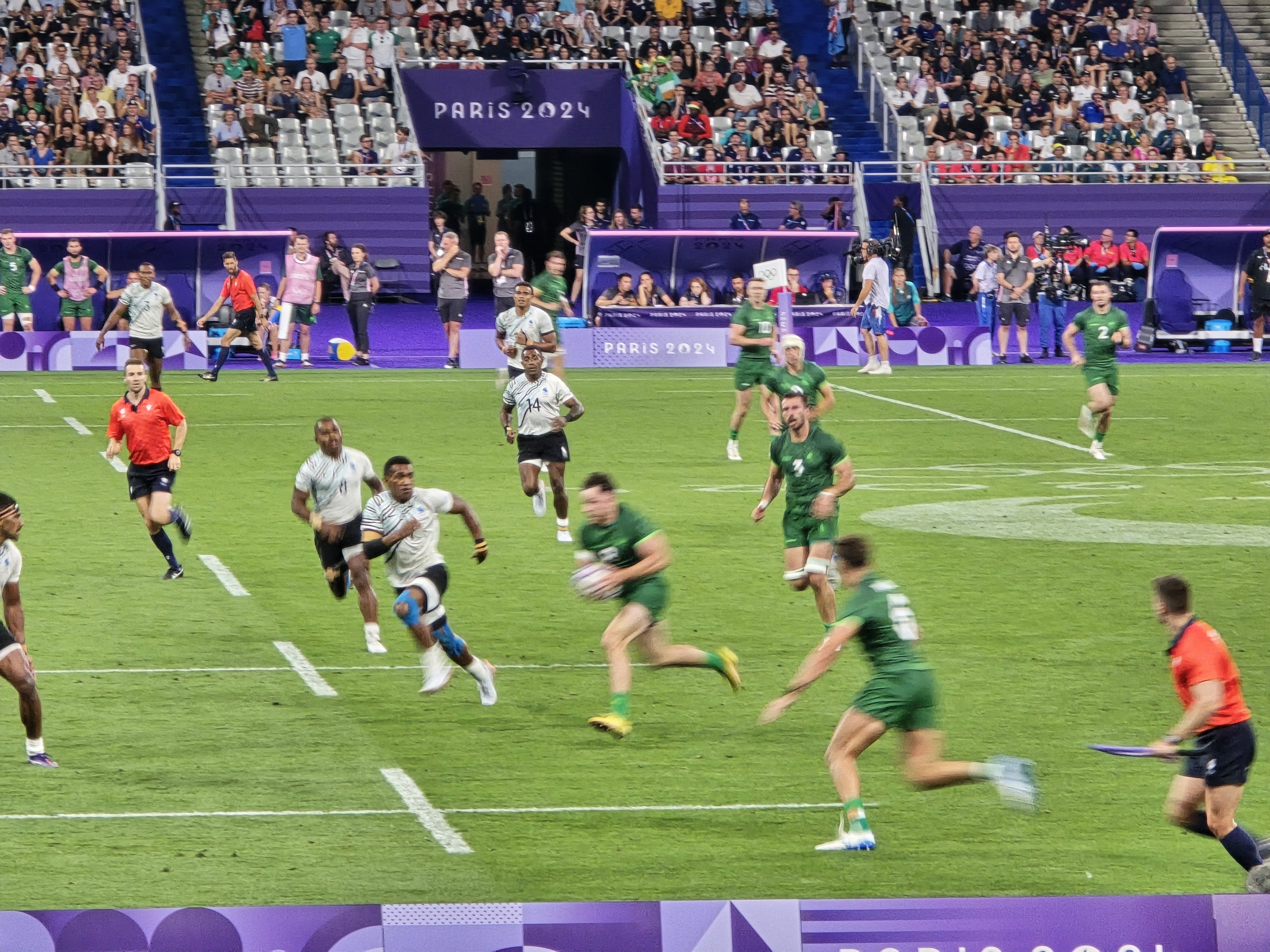
Ireland in possession against Fiji

25 July 2024
22:00

Fiji	19–15	Ireland
Try: Baleiwairiki 1' c Nasova 12' c Nacuqu 12' m Con: Teba (1/1) 2'; Tamani (1/1) 13'	World Rugby	Try: Mullins (2) 5' m, 7' m Ward 9' m

Stade de France, Paris
Attendance: 70,000
Referee: Nick Hogan (New Zealand)

5–8th place playoff semi-final

27 July 2024
15:00

Ireland	17–14	United States
Try: Lennox 1' c Ward 14' m Kennedy 15' m Con: Lennox (1/1) 1'	World Rugby	Try: Cummings 7' c Baker 11' c Con: Tomasin (2/2) 8', 12'

Stade de France, Paris
Referee: Fransisco Gonzalez (Uruguay)

Fifth-place playoff

27 July 2024
18:30

New Zealand	17–7	Ireland
Try: Leo (2) 3' m, 12' c Rush 8' m Con: Knewstubb (1/1) 12'	World Rugby	Try: Mullins 9' c Con: Roche (1/1) 9'

Stade de France, Paris
Referee: Gianluca Gnecchi (Italy)

=== Women's tournament ===
Ireland women's national rugby sevens team qualified for the first time at the Olympics by securing the last of four available spots in the 2022–23 World Rugby Sevens Series, registering a historic victory over Fiji at the final leg in Toulouse.

Team roster

Ireland's squad of 12 players was named on 17 June 2024. Additionally, Claire Boles and Amy Larn were named as traveling reserves.

Head coach: Allan Temple-Jones

- Kathy Baker
- Megan Burns
- Amee-Leigh Murphy Crowe
- Alanna Fitzpatrick
- Stacey Flood
- Eve Higgins
- Erin King
- Vicky Elmes Kinlan
- Emily Lane
- Ashleigh Orchard
- Béibhinn Parsons
- Lucy Rock (c)

Group stage

Pos	Team	Pld	W	D	L	PF	PA	PD	Pts	Qualification
1	Australia	3	3	0	0	89	24	+65	9	Quarter-finals
2	(United Kingdom) Great Britain	3	2	0	1	52	65	−13	7	Quarter-finals
3	(Republic of Ireland) Ireland	3	1	0	2	64	40	+24	5	Quarter-finals
4	South Africa	3	0	0	3	22	98	−76	3	

Source: World Rugby
Rules for classification: 1) Points; 2) Head-to-head result; 3) Point difference; 4) Points scored.

28 July 2024
15:30

Ireland	12–21	Great Britain
Try: Murphy Crowe (2) 3' m, 10' c Con: Mulhall (1/2) 10'	World Rugby	Try: Norman-Bell 4' c Joyce 8' c Uren 10' c Con: Norman-Bell (3/3) 4', 8', 10'

Stade de France, Paris
Referee: Kat Roche (United States)

28 July 2024
19:00

Ireland	38–0	South Africa
Try: Parsons (2) 6' c, 12' c Murphy Crowe 8' c Flood 10' c Elmes Kinlan 14' m Higgins 15' m Con: Mulhall (1/1) 6'; Flood (3/5) 9', 11', 12'	World Rugby

Stade de France, Paris
Referee: Talal Chaudhry (Canada)

29 July 2024
14:30

Australia	19–14	Ireland
Try: Nathan 1' c T. Levi 8' m M. Levi 9' c Con: T. Levi (1/2) 1'; Hinds (1/1) 10'	World Rugby	Try: Higgins (2) 6' c, 14' c Con: Higgins (2/2) 6', 14'

Stade de France, Paris
Referee: George Selwood (England/Great Britain)

Quarter-final

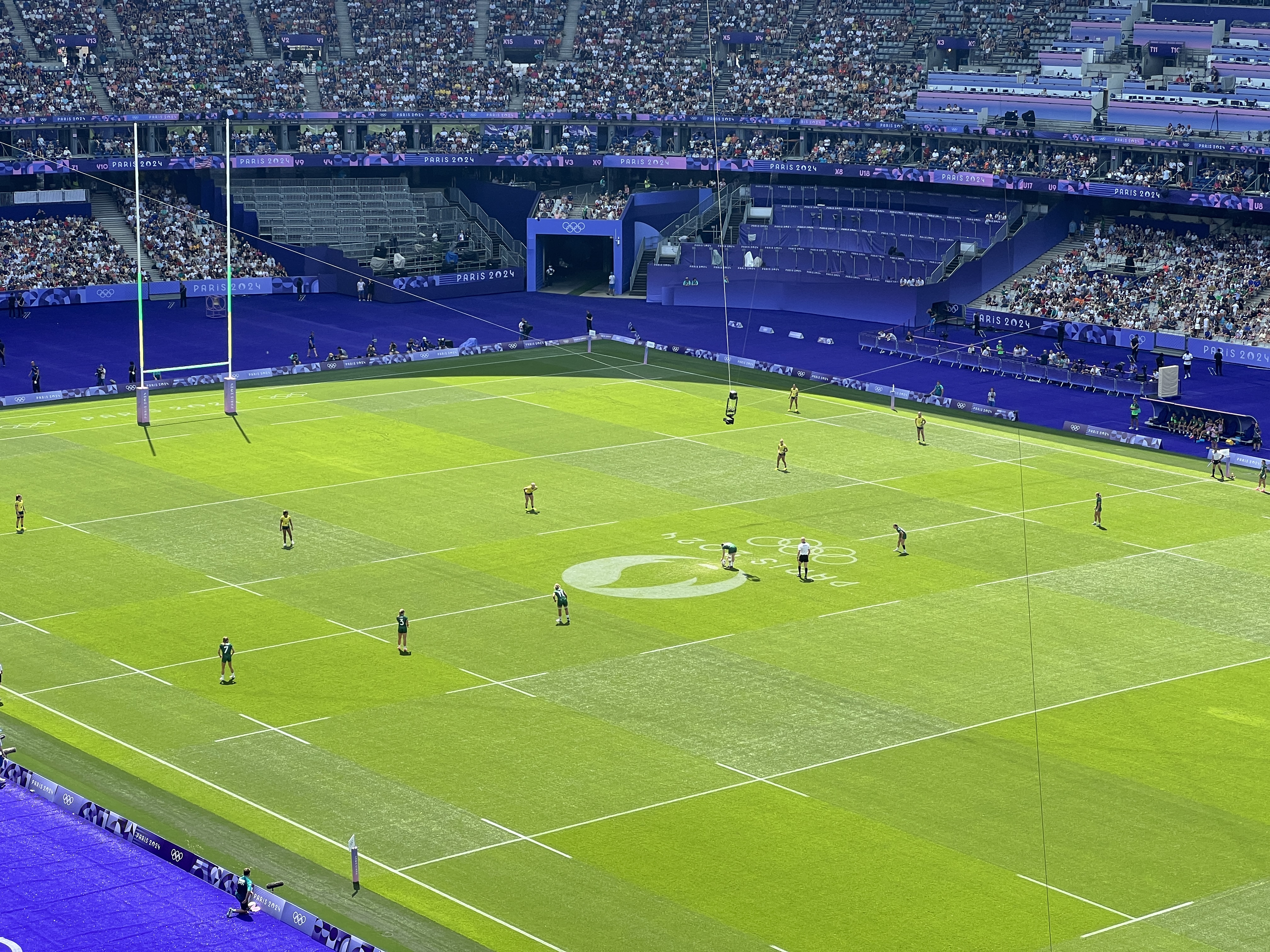
Australia vs Ireland kickoff

29 July 2024
22:30

Australia	40–7	Ireland
Try: M. Levi (3) 1' m, 4' c, 6' c Nathan 7' c Nasser 9' c Terita 14' c Con: Hinds (4/5) 4', 6', 7', 9'; Du Toit (1/1) 15'	World Rugby	Try: Flood 7' c Con: Higgins (1/1) 12'

Stade de France, Paris
Referee: Finlay Brown (Scotland/Great Britain)

5–8th place playoff semi-final

30 July 2024
15:00

France	19–7	Ireland
Try: Okemba 9' c, 14' m Neisen 11' c Con: Drouin (2/2) 9', 12'; Yengo (0/1)	World Rugby	Try: Higgins 6' c Con: Higgins (1/1) 6'

Stade de France, Paris
Referee: Maggie Cogger-Orr (New Zealand)

Seventh-place playoff

30 July 2024
18:00

Great Britain	28–12	Ireland
Try: Jones (2) 2' c, 9' c Shekells 7' c Cowell 9' c Con: Jones (1/1) 3'; Uren (2/2) 7', 16'; Norman-Bell (1/1) 9'	World Rugby	Try: Burns 5' m Boles 10' c Con: Flood (1/1) 14'

Stade de France, Paris
Referee: Tyler Miller (Australia)

== Sailing ==
Irish sailors qualified one boat in each of the following classes through the 2023 Sailing World Championships in The Hague, Netherlands, 2023 49er European Championship in Vilamoura, Portugal, and 2024 ILCA 6 World Championships in Mar del Plata, Argentina. The team was announced on 18 June 2024.

Medal race events

Athlete	Event	Race													Net points	Final rank
Athlete	Event	1	2	3	4	5	6	7	8	9	10	11	12	M*	Net points	Final rank
Finn Lynch	Men's ILCA 7	9	25	~~26~~	22	12	7	13	11	Cancelled		N/A		16	115	10
Eve McMahon	Women's ILCA 6	8	21	16	22	~~34~~	13	6	15	7	Cancelled	N/A		Did not advance	108	13
Robert Dickson; Sean Waddilove	Men's 49er	9	4	1	4	2	~~DSQ~~	4	9	13	11	14	2	18	91	4

M = Medal race (double points); EL = Eliminated – did not advance into the medal race; DSQ = disqualified; ~~26~~ = worst result discarded

== Swimming ==
Irish swimmers achieved the entry standards in the following events for Paris 2024 (a maximum of two swimmers under the Olympic Qualifying Time (OST) and potentially at the Olympic Consideration Time (OCT)): To assure their selection to the Irish roster, swimmers must attain the Olympic qualifying cut in the final (or in heat-declared winner races on time for long-distance freestyle) of each individual pool event at any of the domestic meets approved by World Aquatics, Olympic Federation of Ireland, and Swim Ireland: the 2023 World Aquatics Championships (23–30 July in Fukuoka), the 2024 World Aquatics Championships (2–18 February in Doha), and the 2024 Irish Open Championships (currently set for May 2024), if necessary and available. The team was announced on 4 July 2024.

Athlete	Event	Heat		Semifinal		Final	
Athlete	Event	Time	Rank	Time	Rank	Time	Rank
Thomas Fannon	Men's 50 m freestyle	21.79 NR	6 Q	21.74 NR	10	Did not advance	
Shane Ryan	Men's 50 m freestyle	DNS		Did not advance			
Daniel Wiffen	Men's 800 m freestyle	7:41.53	1 Q	—N/a		7:38.19 OR	1st place, gold medalist(s)
Daniel Wiffen	Men's 1500 m freestyle	14:40.34	1 Q	—N/a		14:39.63	3rd place, bronze medalist(s)
Daniel Wiffen	Men's open water 10 km	—N/a				1:57:20.1	18
Max McCusker; Darragh Greene; Connor Ferguson; Shane Ryan	Men's 4 × 100 m medley relay	3:33.81	11	—N/a		Did not advance	
Danielle Hill	Women's 50 m freestyle	25.02	21	Did not advance			
Danielle Hill	Women's 100 m backstroke	1:00.04	16 Q	1:00.80	16	Did not advance	
Mona McSharry	Women's 100 m breaststroke	1:05.74	3 Q	1:05.51 NR	2 Q	1:05.59	3rd place, bronze medalist(s)
Mona McSharry	Women's 200m breaststroke	2:23.98	7 Q	2:24.48	11	Did not advance	
Ellen Walshe	Women's 100 m butterfly	58.70	22	Did not advance			
Ellen Walshe	Women's 200 m medley	2:11.81	15 Q	2:11.35	13	Did not advance	
Ellen Walshe	Women's 400 m medley	4:39.97	7 Q	—N/a		4:40.70	8
Mona McSharry; Ellen Walshe; Danielle Hill; Grace Davison	Women's 4 × 100 m medley relay	4:00.12	11	—N/a		Did not advance	
Victoria Catterson; Erin Riordan; Grace Davison; Danielle Hill	Women's 4 × 100 m freestyle relay	3:42.67	16	—N/a		Did not advance	

== Taekwondo ==
Jack Woolley was one of two Irish entries at the European Qualification Tournament in Sofia, Bulgaria, and qualified by winning his under-58 kg semifinal.

Athlete	Event	Qualification	Round of 16	Quarterfinals	Semifinals	Repechage	Final / BM	
Athlete	Event	Opposition Result	Opposition Result	Opposition Result	Opposition Result	Opposition Result	Opposition Result	Rank
Jack Woolley	Men's –58 kg	Bye	Magomedov (AZE); L 0–2	Advanced to Repechage due to Magomedov progress		Vicente (ESP); L 0–2	Did not advance	

== See also ==
- Ireland at the 2024 Winter Youth Olympics
- Ireland at the 2024 Summer Paralympics
