= Boxing at the 2024 Summer Olympics =

Boxing at the Games of the XXXIII Olympiad
- Venue: Arena Paris Nord (prelims phase); Roland Garros Stadium (final phase)
- Dates: 27 July – 10 August 2024
- No. of events: 13 (7 men, 6 women)
- Competitors: 248 from 68 nations

The boxing competitions at the 2024 Summer Olympics in Paris ran from 27 July to 10 August. Preliminary boxing matches occurred at Arena Paris Nord in Villepinte, with the medal rounds (semifinals and finals) staged at the Stade Roland Garros.

The boxing program for Paris 2024 featured the same number of weight categories as those in the previous three editions, consisting of thirteen in total. According to the International Olympic Committee's mission of attaining full gender equality, the program continued to remain updated with the number of men's weight classes reduced by one weight category contrary to the women's side's increase by one weight category for a total of 7 men's and 6 women's events compared to 8 men's and 5 women's at the previous edition.

In June 2022, the International Olympic Committee (IOC) barred the International Boxing Association's (IBA) rights to run and organize the tournament due to "continuing irregularity issues in the areas of finance, governance, ethics, refereeing, and judging". Hence, the IOC executive board established and ratified a new qualification system for Paris 2024 that would witness the boxers obtain the quota spots through the continental multisport events, such as the Asian Games, European Games, Pan American Games, African Games, and the Pacific Games.

Uzbekistan topped the medal count in boxing, winning five gold medals (all men's). China was second with three (all women's).

== Competition format ==
Under the IOC's mission of attaining full gender equality, Paris 2024 instituted another significant change to the boxing program, with the number of weight categories for men reduced from eight to seven, ultimately removing the middleweight division. On the other hand, the women's weight classes witnessed a corresponding rise from five to six with the bantamweight category introduced.

The male boxers contested matches in these seven weight classes:

- 51 kg
- 57 kg
- 63.5 kg
- 71 kg
- 80 kg
- 92 kg
- +92 kg

The female boxers contested matches in these six weight classes:

- 50 kg
- 54 kg
- 57 kg
- 60 kg
- 66 kg
- 75 kg

== Qualification ==
A total of 248 quota places, with an equal distribution between men and women, were available for eligible boxers to compete in Paris 2024, almost forty fewer overall than those in Tokyo 2020. Qualified NOCs could only send one boxer in each weight category. The host nation France reserved a maximum of six automatic quota places, to be equally distributed between men and women in their respective weight categories, while nine places (four for men and five for women) were entitled to eligible NOCs interested in having their boxers compete in Paris 2024 as abided by the Universality principle.

The qualification period commenced in five regional multisport events (African Games, Asian Games, European Games, Pacific Games, and the Pan American Games), set to serve as continental qualifying meets, where a total of 139 spots were assigned to a specific number of the highest-ranked boxers in each weight category. Following the continental phase, the remainder of the total quota was decided in two world qualification tournaments organized by the IOC in the initial half of the 2024 season, offering another batch of spots available to the highest-ranked eligible boxers in each weight division.

== Competition schedule ==
Legend

R32	Round of 32	R16	Round of 16	QF	Quarter-Finals	SF	Semi-Finals	F	Final

Date	Jul 27		Jul 28			Jul 29			Jul 30			Jul 31			Aug 1			Aug 2		Aug 3		Aug 4		Aug 5	Aug 6	Aug 7	Aug 8	Aug 9	Aug 10
Event	A	E	M	A	E	M	A	E	M	A	E	M	A	E	M	A	E	A	E	A	E	M	A	E	E	E	E	E	E
Men's 51 kg									R16									QF				SF					F		
Men's 57 kg			R32									R16								QF							SF		F
Men's 63.5 kg	R32					R16									QF							SF				F			
Men's 71 kg			R32									R16								QF					SF			F	
Men's 80 kg	R32								R16									QF				SF				F			
Men's 92kg			R16												QF							SF						F	
Men's +92 kg						R16												QF								SF			F
Women's 50 kg			R32												R16					QF					SF			F	
Women's 54 kg	R32								R16						QF							SF					F		
Women's 57 kg									R32									R16				QF				SF			F
Women's 60 kg	R32					R16						QF								SF					F				
Women's 66 kg			R32												R16					QF					SF			F	
Women's 75 kg												R16										QF					SF		F

== Participating nations ==
248 boxers from 68 NOCs qualified.

- Algeria (5)
- Armenia (1)
- Australia (12)
- Azerbaijan (5)
- Belgium (3)
- Brazil (10)
- Bulgaria (5)
- Canada (2)
- Cape Verde (2)
- China (8)
- Colombia (5)
- Croatia (1)
- Cuba (5)
- Democratic Republic of the Congo (2)
- Denmark (1)
- Dominican Republic (3)
- Ecuador (3)
- Egypt (3)
- Finland (1)
- France (8)
- Georgia (2)
- Germany (2)
- Great Britain (6)
- Haiti (1)
- Hungary (3)
- India (6)
- Ireland (10)
- Italy (8)
- Japan (2)
- Jordan (3)
- Kazakhstan (10)
- Kosovo (1)
- Kyrgyzstan (1)
- Mali (1)
- Mexico (4)
- Mongolia (2)
- Montenegro (1)
- Morocco (3)
- Mozambique (2)
- Netherlands (1)
- Nigeria (3)
- North Korea (2)
- Norway (2)
- Palestine (1)
- Panama (1)
- Papua New Guinea (1)
- Philippines (5)
- Poland (5)
- Puerto Rico (2)
- Refugee Olympic Team (2)
- Romania (1)
- Samoa (1)
- Serbia (3)
- Slovakia (1)
- South Korea (2)
- Spain (6)
- Sweden (2)
- Chinese Taipei (6)
- Tajikistan (3)
- Thailand (8)
- Tonga (1)
- Tunisia (1)
- Turkey (7)
- Ukraine (3)
- United States (8)
- Uzbekistan (11)
- Venezuela (2)
- Vietnam (2)
- Zambia (2)

== Medal summary ==
=== Medal table ===
* Host nation (France)

Rank	NOC	Gold	Silver	Bronze	Total
1	Uzbekistan	5	0	0	5
2	China	3	2	0	5
3	Chinese Taipei	1	0	2	3
4	Cuba	1	0	1	2
5	Algeria	1	0	0	1
5	Ireland	1	0	0	1
5	Ukraine	1	0	0	1
8	France*	0	2	1	3
8	Turkey	0	2	1	3
10	Kazakhstan	0	1	1	2
10	Spain	0	1	1	2
12	Azerbaijan	0	1	0	1
12	Kyrgyzstan	0	1	0	1
12	Mexico	0	1	0	1
12	Panama	0	1	0	1
12	Poland	0	1	0	1
17	Australia	0	0	2	2
17	Dominican Republic	0	0	2	2
17	Philippines	0	0	2	2
20	Brazil	0	0	1	1
20	Bulgaria	0	0	1	1
20	Canada	0	0	1	1
20	Cape Verde	0	0	1	1
20	Georgia	0	0	1	1
20	Germany	0	0	1	1
20	Great Britain	0	0	1	1
20	North Korea	0	0	1	1
20	Refugee Olympic Team	0	0	1	1
20	South Korea	0	0	1	1
20	Tajikistan	0	0	1	1
20	Thailand	0	0	1	1
20	United States	0	0	1	1
Totals (32 entries)		13	13	26	52

=== Men's events ===
Event	Gold	Silver	Bronze
51 kg	Hasanboy Dusmatov; Uzbekistan	Billal Bennama; France	Junior Alcántara; Dominican Republic
51 kg	Hasanboy Dusmatov; Uzbekistan	Billal Bennama; France	Daniel Varela de Pina; Cape Verde
57 kg	Abdumalik Khalokov; Uzbekistan	Munarbek Seiitbek Uulu; Kyrgyzstan	Charlie Senior; Australia
57 kg	Abdumalik Khalokov; Uzbekistan	Munarbek Seiitbek Uulu; Kyrgyzstan	Javier Ibáñez; Bulgaria
63.5 kg	Erislandy Álvarez; Cuba	Sofiane Oumiha; France	Wyatt Sanford; Canada
63.5 kg	Erislandy Álvarez; Cuba	Sofiane Oumiha; France	Lasha Guruli; Georgia
71 kg	Asadkhuja Muydinkhujaev; Uzbekistan	Marco Verde; Mexico	Omari Jones; United States
71 kg	Asadkhuja Muydinkhujaev; Uzbekistan	Marco Verde; Mexico	Lewis Richardson; Great Britain
80 kg	Oleksandr Khyzhniak; Ukraine	Nurbek Oralbay; Kazakhstan	Cristian Pinales; Dominican Republic
80 kg	Oleksandr Khyzhniak; Ukraine	Nurbek Oralbay; Kazakhstan	Arlen López; Cuba
92 kg	Lazizbek Mullojonov; Uzbekistan	Loren Alfonso; Azerbaijan	Enmanuel Reyes; Spain
92 kg	Lazizbek Mullojonov; Uzbekistan	Loren Alfonso; Azerbaijan	Davlat Boltaev; Tajikistan
+92 kg	Bakhodir Jalolov; Uzbekistan	Ayoub Ghadfa; Spain	Nelvie Tiafack; Germany
+92 kg	Bakhodir Jalolov; Uzbekistan	Ayoub Ghadfa; Spain	Djamili-Dini Aboudou Moindze; France

=== Women's events ===
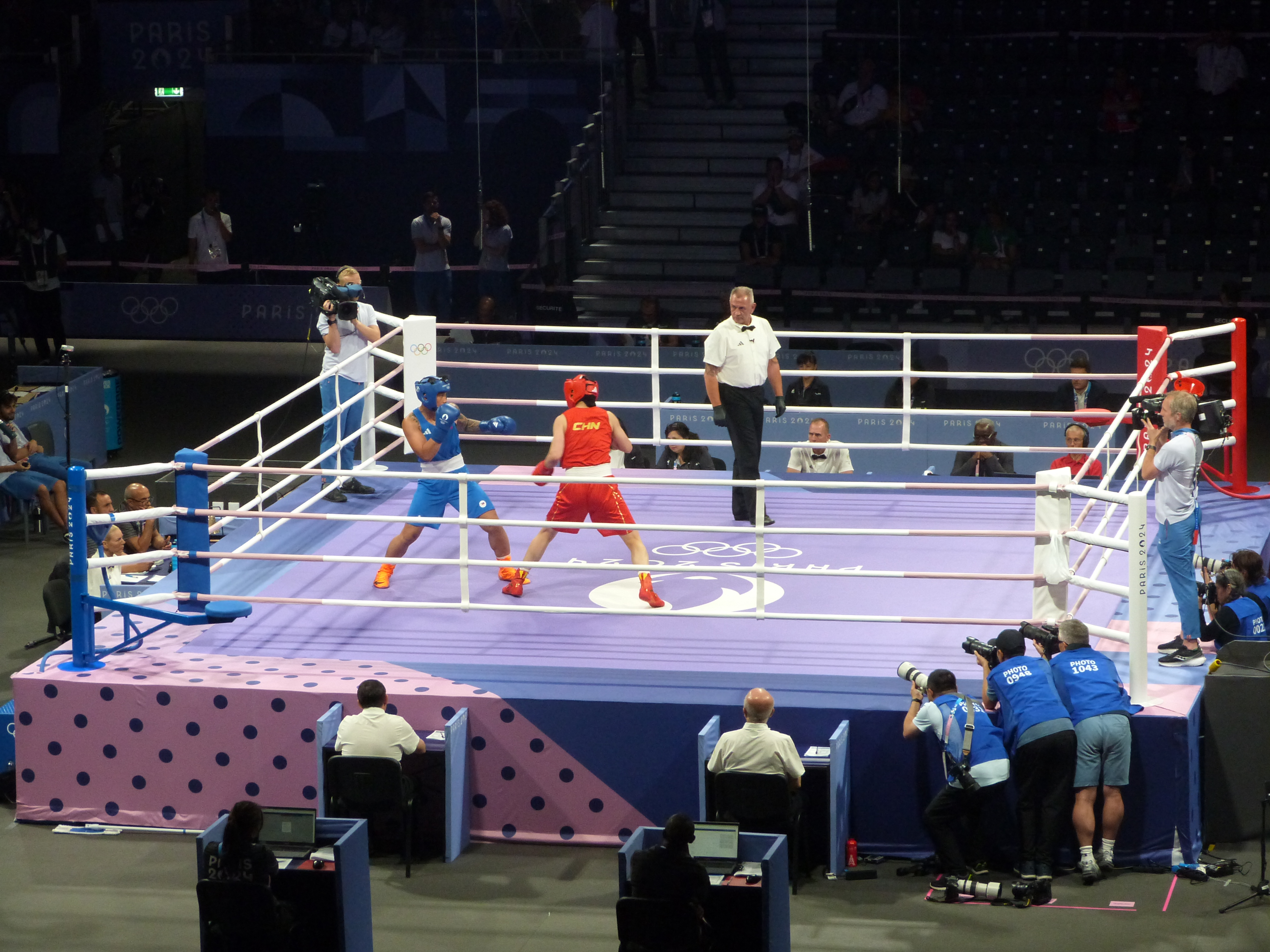
A preliminary fight in the women's 75 kg event

Event	Gold	Silver	Bronze
50 kg	Wu Yu; China	Buse Naz Çakıroğlu; Turkey	Nazym Kyzaibay; Kazakhstan
50 kg	Wu Yu; China	Buse Naz Çakıroğlu; Turkey	Aira Villegas; Philippines
54 kg	Chang Yuan; China	Hatice Akbaş; Turkey	Pang Chol-mi; North Korea
54 kg	Chang Yuan; China	Hatice Akbaş; Turkey	Im Ae-ji; South Korea
57 kg	Lin Yu-ting; Chinese Taipei	Julia Szeremeta; Poland	Esra Yıldız; Turkey
57 kg	Lin Yu-ting; Chinese Taipei	Julia Szeremeta; Poland	Nesthy Petecio; Philippines
60 kg	Kellie Harrington; Ireland	Yang Wenlu; China	Wu Shih-yi; Chinese Taipei
60 kg	Kellie Harrington; Ireland	Yang Wenlu; China	Beatriz Ferreira; Brazil
66 kg	Imane Khelif; Algeria	Yang Liu; China	Janjaem Suwannapheng; Thailand
66 kg	Imane Khelif; Algeria	Yang Liu; China	Chen Nien-chin; Chinese Taipei
75 kg	Li Qian; China	Atheyna Bylon; Panama	Caitlin Parker; Australia
75 kg	Li Qian; China	Atheyna Bylon; Panama	Cindy Ngamba; Refugee Olympic Team

== See also ==
- Boxing at the 2022 Asian Games
- Boxing at the 2023 European Games
- Boxing at the 2023 Pan American Games
