= Boxing at the 2020 Summer Olympics – Women's lightweight =

Olympic boxing event

Women's lightweight at the Games of the XXXII Olympiad
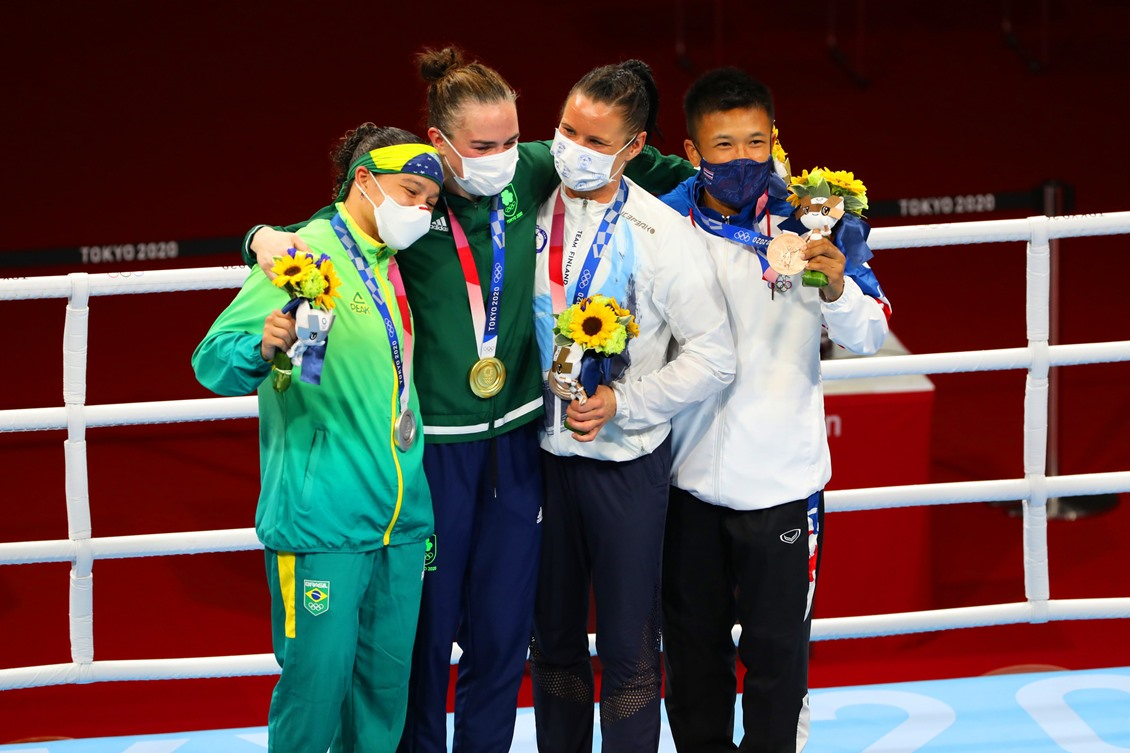
- Boxing medalists
- Venue: Ryōgoku Kokugikan
- Dates: 27 July – 8 August 2021
- Competitors: 21 from 21 nations

Medalists
1st place, gold medalist(s)		Kellie Harrington	Ireland
2nd place, silver medalist(s)		Beatriz Ferreira	Brazil
3rd place, bronze medalist(s)		Sudaporn Seesondee	Thailand
3rd place, bronze medalist(s)		Mira Potkonen	Finland

The women's lightweight boxing event at the 2020 Summer Olympics took place between 27 July and 8 August 2021 at the Ryōgoku Kokugikan. 20 boxers from 20 nations competed.

Kellie Harrington from Ireland won the gold medal, after defeating Brazil's Beatriz Ferreira in the final.

Bronze medals were awarded to both semi-final losers: Sudaporn Seesondee from Thailand and Mira Potkonen from Finland.

The medals for the competition were presented by Sari Essayah, Finland; IOC Member, and the medalists' bouquets were presented by Willi Kaltschmitt Luján, Guatemala; BTF Member.

== Background ==
This was the 3rd appearance of the women's lightweight event. The event had been held every Summer Games since the introduction of women's boxing in 2012. It had been at the 57–60 kg range each appearance.

Reigning World Champion Beatriz Ferreira of Brazil qualified for the Games. The reigning Olympic champion, Estelle Mossely of France, turned professional and did not attempt to qualify.

== Qualification ==
A National Olympic Committee (NOC) could enter only 1 qualified boxer in the weight class. There were 20 quota places available for the women's lightweight, allocated as follows:

- 2 places at the 2020 African Boxing Olympic Qualification Tournament.
- 4 places at the 2020 Asia & Oceania Boxing Olympic Qualification Tournament.
- 6 places at the 2020 European Boxing Olympic Qualification Tournament.
- 3 places that were intended to be awarded at the 2021 Pan American Boxing Olympic Qualification Tournament, which was cancelled. These places were instead awarded through the world ranking list to the top boxers from the Americas who had been registered for the qualification tournament.
- 4 places that were intended to be awarded at a World Olympic Qualifying Tournament, which was cancelled. These places were instead awarded through the world ranking list, with one place for each continental zone (Africa, Asia & Oceania, Europe, Americas).
- 1 place for a Tripartite Commission invitation.

The host nation, Japan, was guaranteed a minimum of two places across the five women's boxing events; because Japan qualified boxers in the flyweight and featherweight through the Asia & Oceania tournament, no host places were used in any women's weight class.

== Competition format ==
Like all Olympic boxing events, the competition was a straight single-elimination tournament. The competition began with a preliminary round, where the number of competitors was reduced to 16, and concluded with a final. As there were fewer than 32 boxers in the competition, a number of boxers received a bye through the preliminary round. Both semifinal losers were awarded bronze medals.

Bouts consisted of three three-minute rounds with a one-minute break between rounds. A boxer may win by knockout or by points. Scoring was on the "10-point-must" system, with 5 judges scoring each round. Judges considered "number of blows landed on the target areas, domination of the bout, technique and tactical superiority and competitiveness." Each judge determined a winner for each round, who received 10 points for the round, and assigned the round's loser a number of points between 7 and 9 based on performance. The judge's scored for each round are added to give a total score for that judge. The boxer with the higher score from a majority of the judges is the winner.

== Schedule ==
The lightweight started with the round of 32 on 27 July. There were two rest days before the round of 16 on 30 July, three more before the quarterfinals on 3 August, one more before the semifinals on 5 August, and two more before the final on 8 August.

Legend

R32	Round of 32	R16	Round of 16	QF	Quarterfinals	SF	Semifinals	F	Final

Date	Jul 24		Jul 25		Jul 26		Jul 27		Jul 28		Jul 29		Jul 30		Jul 31		Aug 1		Aug 2		Aug 3		Aug 4		Aug 5		Aug 6		Aug 7		Aug 8	
Event	A	E	A	E	A	E	A	E	A	E	A	E	A	E	A	E	A	E	A	E	A	E	A	E	A	E	A	E	A	E	A	E
Women's lightweight							R32						R16								QF				SF						F	

== Results ==
=== Finals ===
Final
Kellie Harrington (IRL)	5
Beatriz Ferreira (BRA)	0

=== Top half ===
Round of 32
Rebecca Nicoli (ITA)	4
Esmeralda Falcón (MEX)	1
Caroline Dubois (GBR)	5
Donjeta Sadiku (KOS)	0
Sudaporn Seesondee (THA)	5
María José Palacios (ECU)	0

Round of 16
Kellie Harrington (IRL)	5
Rebecca Nicoli (ITA)	0
Imane Khelif (ALG)	5
Mariem Homrani (TUN)	0
Rashida Ellis (USA)	0
Caroline Dubois (GBR)	3
Sudaporn Seesondee (THA)	5
Simranjit Kaur (IND)	0

Quarterfinals
Kellie Harrington (IRL)	5
Imane Khelif (ALG)	0
Caroline Dubois (GBR)	2
Sudaporn Seesondee (THA)	3

Semifinals
Kellie Harrington (IRL)	3
Sudaporn Seesondee (THA)	2

=== Bottom half ===
Round of 32
Wu Shih-yi (TPE)	4
Agnes Alexiusson (SWE)	1
Maïva Hamadouche (FRA)	1
Mira Potkonen (FIN)	3

Round of 16
Beatriz Ferreira (BRA)	5
Wu Shih-yi (TPE)	0
Raykhona Kodirova (UZB)	5
Naomie Yumba (COD)	0
Esra Yıldız (TUR)	5
Dayana Sánchez (ARG)	0
Mira Potkonen (FIN)	4
Oh Yeon-ji (KOR)	1

Quarterfinals
Beatriz Ferreira (BRA)	5
Raykhona Kodirova (UZB)	0
Esra Yıldız (TUR)	2
Mira Potkonen (FIN)	3

Semifinals
Beatriz Ferreira (BRA)	5
Mira Potkonen (FIN)	0
