= Boxing at the 2022 Asian Games – Women's 60 kg =

Boxing competitions

Women's 60 kg at the 2022 Asian Games
- Venue: Hangzhou Gymnasium
- Date: 24 September – 4 October 2023
- Competitors: 18 from 18 nations

Medalists
gold medal	Yang Wenlu	China
silver medal	Won Un-gyong	North Korea
bronze medal	Thananya Somnuek	Thailand
bronze medal	Wu Shih-yi	Chinese Taipei

The women's 60 kilograms event at the 2022 Asian Games took place from 24 September to 4 October 2023 at Hangzhou Gymnasium, Hangzhou, China.

== Schedule ==
All times are China Standard Time (UTC+08:00)

Date	Time	Event
Sunday, 24 September 2023	14:00	Preliminaries – R32
Thursday, 28 September 2023	14:00	Preliminaries – R16
Sunday, 1 October 2023	14:00	Quarterfinals
Tuesday, 3 October 2023	19:00	Semifinals
Wednesday, 4 October 2023	19:00	Final

== Results ==
Legend

- RSC — Won by referee stop contest

=== Final ===
Final
Won Un-gyong (PRK)	0
Yang Wenlu (CHN)	5

=== Top half ===
Round of 32
Bibinashastamo Kholova (TJK)
Thananya Somnuek (THA)	RSC

Round of 16
Riza Pasuit (PHI)
Thananya Somnuek (THA)	WO
Noura Al-Mutairi (KUW)	0
Huswatun Hasanah (INA)	5
Hadeel Ashour (KSA)
Jaismine Lamboria (IND)	RSC
Oh Yeon-ji (KOR)	0
Won Un-gyong (PRK)	5

Quarterfinals
Thananya Somnuek (THA)	RSC
Huswatun Hasanah (INA)
Jaismine Lamboria (IND)
Won Un-gyong (PRK)	RSC

Semifinals
Thananya Somnuek (THA)	0
Won Un-gyong (PRK)	5

=== Bottom half ===
Preliminaries – R32
Hà Thị Linh (VIE)	5
Sangita Sunar (NEP)	0

Preliminaries – R16
Dana Al-Jabor (QAT)
Raykhona Kodirova (UZB)	RSC
Wu Shih-yi (TPE)	4
Rimma Volossenko (KAZ)	1
Tögsjargalyn Nomin-Erdene (MGL)	5
Ayaka Taguchi (JPN)	0
Hà Thị Linh (VIE)	0
Yang Wenlu (CHN)	5

Quarterfinals
Raykhona Kodirova (UZB)	2
Wu Shih-yi (TPE)	3
Tögsjargalyn Nomin-Erdene (MGL)	0
Yang Wenlu (CHN)	5

Semifinals
Wu Shih-yi (TPE)	0
Yang Wenlu (CHN)	5
