= Boxing at the 2024 Summer Olympics – Women's 60 kg =

Women's 60 kg at the Games of the XXXIII Olympiad
- Boxing pictogram
- Venue: Arena Paris Nord (preliminary); Stade Roland Garros (semifinals and finals)
- Dates: 27 July – 6 August 2024
- Competitors: 22 from 22 nations

Medalists
1st place, gold medalist(s)		Kellie Harrington	Ireland
2nd place, silver medalist(s)		Yang Wenlu	China
3rd place, bronze medalist(s)		Wu Shih-yi	Chinese Taipei
3rd place, bronze medalist(s)		Beatriz Ferreira	Brazil

The women's 60 kg (lightweight) boxing event at the 2024 Summer Olympics took place between 27 July and 6 August 2024. Preliminary boxing matches occurred at Arena Paris Nord in Villepinte, with the medal rounds (semifinals and finals) staged at Stade Roland Garros.

== Background ==
This was the 4th appearance of the women's lightweight event. The event had been held every Summer Games since the introduction of women's boxing in 2012. At each appearance, it was the 57–60 kg range.

== Qualification ==
Each NOC could send one boxer to the event.

== Competition format ==
Like all Olympic boxing events, the competition was a straight single-elimination tournament. The competition began with a preliminary round, where the number of competitors was reduced to 16, and concluded with a final. As there were fewer than 32 boxers in the competition, a number of boxers received a bye through the preliminary round. Both semi-final losers were awarded bronze medals.

Bouts consisted of three three-minute rounds with a one-minute break between rounds. A boxer may win by knockout or by points. Scoring was on the "10-point-must," with five judges scoring each round. Judges consider "number of blows landed on the target areas, domination of the bout, technique and tactical superiority and competitiveness." Each judge determined a winner for each round, who received 10 points for the round, and assigned the round's loser a number of points between seven and nine based on performance. The judge's scores for each round were added to give a total score for that judge. The boxer with the higher score from a majority of the judges was the winner.

== Schedule ==
The schedule was as follows.

Legend

R32	Round of 32	R16	Round of 16	QF	Quarter-Finals	SF	Semi-Finals	F	Final

Jul 27	Jul 28	Jul 29	Jul 30	Jul 31	Aug 1	Aug 2	Aug 3	Aug 4	Aug 5	Aug 6
R32		R16		QF			SF			F

== Draw ==
The draw was held on 25 July 2024.

== Seeds ==
The seeds were released on 25 July 2024.

1. Yang Wenlu (CHN) (final)
2. Beatriz Ferreira (BRA) (semifinals)
3. Kellie Harrington (IRL) (champion)
4. Cynthia Ogunsemilore (NGR) (disqualified)
5. Tyla McDonald (AUS) (round of 16)
6. Angie Valdés (COL) (quarterfinal)
7. Won Un-gyong (PRK) (round of 16)
8. Natalia Šadrina (SRB) (quarterfinal)

== Results ==
=== Finals ===
Final
6 August
Yang Wenlu (CHN)	1
Kellie Harrington (IRL)	4

=== Top half ===
Round of 32
27 July
Fe'ofa'aki Epenisa (TGA)	0
Hà Thị Linh (VIE)	5
27 July
María José Palacios (ECU)	4
Agnes Alexiusson (SWE)	1
27 July
Wu Shih-yi (TPE)	5
Oh Yeon-ji (KOR)	0

Round of 16
29 July
Yang Wenlu (CHN)	5
Hà Thị Linh (VIE)	0
29 July
Hadjila Khelif (ALG)	0
Natalia Šadrina (SRB)	5
29 July
Tyla McDonald (AUS)	0
María José Palacios (ECU)	5
29 July
Wu Shih-yi (TPE)	DSQ
~~Cynthia Ogunsemilore (NGR)~~

Quarterfinals
31 July
Yang Wenlu (CHN)	3
Natalia Šadrina (SRB)	2
31 July
María José Palacios (ECU)	1
Wu Shih-yi (TPE)	4

Semifinals
3 August
Yang Wenlu (CHN)	5
Wu Shih-yi (TPE)	0

=== Bottom half ===
Round of 32
27 July
Alessia Mesiano (ITA)	4
Gizem Özer (TUR)	1
27 July
Thananya Somnuek (THA)	2
Donjeta Sadiku (KOS)	3
27 July
Estelle Mossely (FRA)	0
Jajaira Gonzalez (USA)	4

Round of 16
29 July
Kellie Harrington (IRL)	5
Alessia Mesiano (ITA)	0
29 July
Donjeta Sadiku (KOS)	2
Angie Valdés (COL)	3
29 July
Won Un-gyong (PRK)	1
Chelsey Heijnen (NED)	4
29 July
Jajaira Gonzalez (USA)	0
Beatriz Ferreira (BRA)	5

Quarterfinals
31 July
Kellie Harrington (IRL)	5
Angie Valdés (COL)	0
31 July
Chelsey Heijnen (NED)	0
Beatriz Ferreira (BRA)	5

Semifinals
3 August
Kellie Harrington (IRL)	4
Beatriz Ferreira (BRA)	1
