= Boxing at the 2022 Bolivarian Games =

Boxing competitions at the 2022 Bolivarian Games

- Boxing pictogram
- Venue: Parque de la Leyenda Vallenata Consuelo Araujo Noguera
- Dates: 25–30 June 2022

Boxing competitions at the 2022 Bolivarian Games in Valledupar, Colombia was held from 25 to 30 June 2022 at the Parque de la Leyenda Vallenata Consuelo Araujo Noguera.

== Medalists ==
=== Men ===
Event	Gold	Silver	Bronze
48 kg	Yuberjen Martínez; Colombia	Miguel Ramos; Venezuela	Luis Delgado; Ecuador
48 kg	Yuberjen Martínez; Colombia	Miguel Ramos; Venezuela	Martín Pérez; Panama
52 kg	Yilmar González; Colombia	Jean Caicedo; Ecuador	Darwin Pérez; Peru
52 kg	Yilmar González; Colombia	Jean Caicedo; Ecuador	Rodrigo Marte; Dominican Republic
63 kg	Alexy de la Cruz; Dominican Republic	José Viáfara; Colombia	Leodan Pezo; Peru
63 kg	Alexy de la Cruz; Dominican Republic	José Viáfara; Colombia	Jesús Cedeño; Venezuela
69 kg	Christiann Palacio; Venezuela	José Gabriel Rodríguez Tenorio; Ecuador	Rodrigo Denis; Paraguay
69 kg	Christiann Palacio; Venezuela	José Gabriel Rodríguez Tenorio; Ecuador	Eduardo Beckford; Panama
75 kg	Euri Cedeño; Dominican Republic	Jorge Mercado; Ecuador	Diego Motoa; Colombia
75 kg	Euri Cedeño; Dominican Republic	Jorge Mercado; Ecuador	Diego Andrés Pereira; Venezuela
81 kg
81 kg	Cristian Pinales; Dominican Republic	Jorge Vivas; Colombia	Nalek Korbaj; Venezuela
91 kg	Julio Castillo; Ecuador	Marlon Hurtado; Colombia	José María Lúcar; Peru
91 kg	Julio Castillo; Ecuador	Marlon Hurtado; Colombia	Andrews Salgado; Chile
+91 kg	Cristian Salcedo; Colombia	Miguel Veliz; Chile	Gerlon Congo; Ecuador
+91 kg	Cristian Salcedo; Colombia	Miguel Veliz; Chile	Ever Quisbert; Bolivia

=== Women ===
Event	Gold	Silver	Bronze
51 kg	Ingrit Valencia; Colombia	Miguelina Hernández; Dominican Republic	Aylin Jamez; Guatemala
51 kg	Ingrit Valencia; Colombia	Miguelina Hernández; Dominican Republic	Tayonis Cedeño; Venezuela
57 kg	Yeni Arias; Colombia	Omailyn Alcalá; Venezuela	Estéfani Almánzar; Dominican Republic
57 kg	Yeni Arias; Colombia	Omailyn Alcalá; Venezuela	Minerva Montiel; Paraguay
60 kg	Angie Valdés; Colombia	Valentina Bustamante; Chile	María Beatriz Osorio; Guatemala
60 kg	Angie Valdés; Colombia	Valentina Bustamante; Chile	María José Palacios; Ecuador
69 kg	Shirleidis Orozco; Colombia	María Moronta; Dominican Republic	María Chiroy; Guatemala
69 kg	Shirleidis Orozco; Colombia	María Moronta; Dominican Republic	Ninoska Pérez; Venezuela
75 kg	Atheyna Bylon; Panama	Maryelis Yriza; Venezuela	Zulena Álvarez; Guatemala
75 kg	Atheyna Bylon; Panama	Maryelis Yriza; Venezuela	Érika Pachito; Ecuador

== Medal table ==
* Host nation (Colombia)

Rank	Nation	Gold	Silver	Bronze	Total
1	Colombia (COL)*	7	3	1	11
2	Dominican Republic (DOM)	3	2	2	7
3	Venezuela (VEN)	1	3	5	9
4	Ecuador (ECU)	1	3	4	8
5	Panama (PAN)	1	0	2	3
6	Chile (CHI)	0	2	1	3
7	Guatemala (GUA)	0	0	4	4
8	Peru (PER)	0	0	3	3
9	Paraguay (PAR)	0	0	2	2
10	Bolivia (BOL)	0	0	1	1
Totals (10 entries)		13	13	25	51
