= 2022 IBA Women's World Boxing Championships – Lightweight =

Lightweight at the 2022 IBA Women's World Boxing Championships
- Venue: Başakşehir Youth and Sports Facility
- Location: Istanbul, Turkey
- Dates: 12–20 May
- Competitors: 31 from 31 nations

Medalists
gold medal	Rashida Ellis	United States
silver medal	Beatriz Ferreira	Brazil
bronze medal	Alessia Mesiano	Italy
bronze medal	Donjeta Sadiku	Kosovo

The Lightweight competition at the 2022 IBA Women's World Boxing Championships was held from 12 to 20 May 2022.

== Results ==
=== Finals ===
Semi-finals
(Italy) Alessia Mesiano	0
(Brazil) Beatriz Ferreira	5
(Kosovo) Donjeta Sadiku	0
(United States) Rashida Ellis	5

Final
(Brazil) Beatriz Ferreira	2
(United States) Rashida Ellis	3

=== Top half ===
==== Section 1 ====
Round of 32
(Greece) Mariela Cani	3
(Morocco) Chaymae Rhaddi	2
(Puerto Rico) Kiria Tapia	5
(Lithuania) Ana Starovoitova	0
(Italy) Alessia Mesiano	3
(Turkey) Esra Yıldız	2

Round of 16
(Nepal) Punam Rawal	0
(Greece) Mariela Cani	5
(Puerto Rico) Kiria Tapia	1
(Italy) Alessia Mesiano	4

Quarterfinals
(Greece) Mariela Cani	0
(Italy) Alessia Mesiano	5

==== Section 2 ====
Round of 32
(Kazakhstan) Rimma Volossenko	0
(England) Shona Whitwell	4
(Serbia) Natalia Sadrina	5
(South Korea) Oh Yeon-ji	0
(Mongolia) Ganzorigiin Badmaarag
(Brazil) Beatriz Ferreira	RSC
(Sweden) Agnes Alexiusson	0
(Chile) Valentina Bustamante	5

Round of 16
(England) Shona Whitwell	0
(Serbia) Natalia Sadrina	4
(Brazil) Beatriz Ferreira	5
(Chile) Valentina Bustamante	0

Quarterfinals
(Serbia) Natalia Sadrina	0
(Brazil) Beatriz Ferreira	5

=== Bottom half ===
==== Section 3 ====
Round of 32
(Kosovo) Donjeta Sadiku	5
(Japan) Ayaka Taguchi	0
(Kenya) Stacy Ayoma	0
(Democratic Republic of the Congo) Jocelyne Tshamala	5
(Ukraine) Amina Abramova	2
(Uzbekistan) Mokhinabonu Abdullaeva	3
(Bulgaria) Gabriela Dimitrova	0
(Chinese Taipei) Wu Shih-yi	4

Round of 16
(Kosovo) Donjeta Sadiku	5
(Democratic Republic of the Congo) Jocelyne Tshamala	0
(Uzbekistan) Mokhinabonu Abdullaeva	0
(Chinese Taipei) Wu Shih-yi	5

Quarterfinals
(Kosovo) Donjeta Sadiku	5
(Chinese Taipei) Wu Shih-yi	0

==== Section 4 ====
Round of 32
(Germany) Lena Büchner
(Australia) Angela Harries	w/o
(India) Jaismine Lamboriya	4
(Thailand) Porntip Buapa	1
(Venezuela) Krisandy Ríos	5
(Scotland) Megan Reid	0
(United States) Rashida Ellis	5
(Croatia) Marija Malenica	0

Round of 16
(Australia) Angela Harries
(India) Jaismine Lamboriya	RSC
(Venezuela) Krisandy Ríos	0
(United States) Rashida Ellis	5

Quarterfinals
(India) Jaismine Lamboriya	1
(United States) Rashida Ellis	4
