= 2023 IBA Women's World Boxing Championships – Lightweight =

Lightweight at the 2023 IBA Women's World Boxing Championships
- Venue: K. D. Jadhav Indoor Hall
- Location: New Delhi, India
- Dates: 17–26 March
- Competitors: 31 from 31 nations

Medalists
gold medal	Beatriz Ferreira	Brazil
silver medal	Angie Valdés	Colombia
bronze medal	Oh Yeon-ji	South Korea
bronze medal	Yang Wenlu	China

The Lightweight competition at the 2023 IBA Women's World Boxing Championships was held between 17 and 26 March 2023.

== Results ==
=== Finals ===
Semi-finals
(Brazil) Beatriz Ferreira	5
(South Korea) Oh Yeon-ji	0
(China) Yang Wenlu	0
(Colombia) Angie Valdés	5

Final
(Brazil) Beatriz Ferreira	5
(Colombia) Angie Valdés	0

=== Top half ===
==== Section 1 ====
Round of 32
(Australia) Danielle Scanlon	4
(Nepal) Sangita Sunar	1
(Mongolia) Tögsjargalyn Nomin-Erdene	1
(Japan) Ayaka Taguchi	4
(Tunisia) Mariem Homrani	0
(Romania) Loredana Marin	5

Round of 16
(Brazil) Beatriz Ferreira	5
(Australia) Danielle Scanlon	0
(Japan) Ayaka Taguchi	5
(Romania) Loredana Marin	0

Quarterfinals
(Brazil) Beatriz Ferreira	5
(Japan) Ayaka Taguchi	0

==== Section 2 ====
Round of 32
(South Korea) Oh Yeon-ji	5
(Mexico) Esmeralda Falcón	0
(Kenya) Lucy Ayoma	1
(Moldova) Cristina Chiper	4
(Bulgaria) Aslahan Mehmedova	0
(Belarus) Ala Ivashkevich	4
(Russia) Nadezhda Golubeva	0
(Algeria) Hadjila Khelif	5

Round of 16
(South Korea) Oh Yeon-ji	5
(Moldova) Cristina Chiper	0
(Belarus) Ala Ivashkevich	0
(Algeria) Hadjila Khelif	5

Quarterfinals
(South Korea) Oh Yeon-ji	5
(Algeria) Hadjila Khelif	0

=== Bottom half ===
==== Section 3 ====
Round of 32
(Italy) Alessia Mesiano	0
(China) Yang Wenlu	5
(Armenia) Elida Kocharyan	5
(Slovakia) Miroslava Jedináková	0
(Kazakhstan) Rimma Volossenko	4
(Uzbekistan) Sitora Turdibekova	3
(Greece) Olga Papadatou	0
(Serbia) Natalia Šadrina	5

Round of 16
(China) Yang Wenlu	5
(Armenia) Elida Kocharyan	0
(Kazakhstan) Rimma Volossenko	5
(Serbia) Natalia Šadrina	2

Quarterfinals
(China) Yang Wenlu	5
(Kazakhstan) Rimma Volossenko	0

==== Section 4 ====
Round of 32
(India) Jaismine Lamboria	RSC
(Tanzania) Beatrice Nyambega
(Tajikistan) Mijgona Samadova	5
(Turkey) Arife Yeliz Altın	0
(Thailand) Porntip Buapa	0
(France) Estelle Mossely	5
(Colombia) Angie Valdés	5
(Chinese Taipei) Wu Shih-yi	0

Round of 16
(India) Jaismine Lamboria	5
(Tajikistan) Mijgona Samadova	0
(France) Estelle Mossely	0
(Colombia) Angie Valdés	5

Quarterfinals
(India) Jaismine Lamboria	0
(Colombia) Angie Valdés	5
