= 2016 AIBA Women's World Boxing Championships – Light welterweight =

Boxing competitions

Light flyweight at the 2016 AIBA Women's World Boxing Championships
- Dates: 20–27 May
- Competitors: 25 from 25 nations

Medalists
gold medal	Yang Wenlu	China
silver medal	Kellie Harrington	Ireland
bronze medal	Sara Kali	Canada
bronze medal	Skye Nicolson	Australia

The Light welterweight (64 kg) competition at the 2016 AIBA Women's World Boxing Championships was held from 20 to 27 May 2016.

== Draw ==
Round of 32
20 May
(Kazakhstan) Zarina Tsoloyeva	3
(Vietnam) Hà Thị Linh	0
20 May
(Lithuania) Austėja Aučiūtė	0
(Republic of Ireland) Kellie Harrington	3
20 May
(Germany) Cindy Rogge	3
(Hungary) Eszter Oláh	0
20 May
(Mongolia) Nyamjargalyn Bayantsetseg	2
(Uzbekistan) Khatuna Djumabaeva	0
20 May
(Gabon) Nadege Edou
(Canada) Sara Kali	TKO-I
20 May
(Azerbaijan) Ayzanat Hajiyeva
(United States) Jajaira Gonzalez	TKO
20 May
(United Kingdom) Sandy Ryan	3
(Morocco) Asmae Ouazri	0
20 May
(Chinese Taipei) Wu Pei-yi	0
(Turkey) Gamze Başar	3
20 May
(Australia) Skye Nicolson	3
(Croatia) Antonija Pavić	0

Round of 16
23 May
(Italy) Calentina Alberti	0
(Kazakhstan) Zarina Tsoloyeva	2
23 May
(Republic of Ireland) Kellie Harrington	3
(Germany) Cindy Rogge	0
23 May
(Ukraine) Anna Lysenko	3
(Mongolia) Nyamjargalyn Bayantsetseg	0
23 May
(Canada) Sara Kali	2
(North Korea) Pak Kyong-ok	0
23 May
(China) Yang Wenlu	3
(United States) Jajaira Gonzalez	0
23 May
(United Kingdom) Sandy Ryan	3
(Russia) Daria Abramova	0
23 May
(Serbia) Milena Matović	0
(Turkey) Gamze Başar	2
23 May
(Australia) Skye Nicolson	3
(India) Pavitra	0

Quarterfinals
24 May
(Kazakhstan) Zarina Tsoloyeva	0
(Republic of Ireland) Kellie Harrington	3
24 May
(Ukraine) Anna Lysenko	0
(Canada) Sara Kali	3
24 May
(China) Yang Wenlu	3
(United Kingdom) Sandy Ryan	0
24 May
(Turkey) Gamze Başar	0
(Australia) Skye Nicolson	3

Semifinals
26 May
(Republic of Ireland) Kellie Harrington	3
(Canada) Sara Kali	0
26 May
(China) Yang Wenlu	3
(Australia) Skye Nicolson	0

Final
27 May
(Republic of Ireland) Kellie Harrington	0
(China) Yang Wenlu	2
