= Boxing at the 2018 Asian Games – Women's 60 kg =

Boxing competitions

Women's 60 kg at the 2018 Asian Games
- Venue: Jakarta International Expo
- Date: 25 August – 1 September 2018
- Competitors: 15 from 15 nations

Medalists
gold medal	Oh Yeon-ji	South Korea
silver medal	Sudaporn Seesondee	Thailand
bronze medal	Huswatun Hasanah	Indonesia
bronze medal	Choe Hye-song	North Korea

The women's lightweight (60 kilograms) event at the 2018 Asian Games took place from 25 August to 1 September 2018 at Jakarta International Expo Hall, Jakarta, Indonesia.

Like all Asian Games boxing events, the competition was a straight single-elimination tournament. Oh Yeon-ji of South Korea won the gold medal. She beat Sudaporn Seesondee from Thailand in the final bout 4–1. Huswatun Hasanah from Indonesia and Choe Hye-song of North Korea shared the bronze medal.

== Schedule ==
All times are Western Indonesia Time (UTC+07:00)

Date	Time	Event
Saturday, 25 August 2018	13:00	Round of 16
Tuesday, 28 August 2018	13:00	Quarterfinals
Friday, 31 August 2018	14:00	Semifinals
Saturday, 1 September 2018	14:00	Final

== Results ==
Legend

- RSC — Won by referee stop contest

Round of 16
Wu Shih-yi (TPE)	1
Sudaporn Seesondee (THA)	4
Rukhsana Parveen (PAK)
Pavitra (IND)	RSC
Huswatun Hasanah (INA)	5
Farida Pupova (KGZ)	0
Yang Wenlu (CHN)	5
Punam Rawal (NEP)	0
Oh Yeon-ji (KOR)	5
Lừu Thị Duyên (VIE)	0
Krishmi Dharmathilake (SRI)	0
Shoira Zulkaynarova (TJK)	5
Monkhoryn Namuun (MGL)	0
Choe Hye-song (PRK)	5

Quarterfinals
Rimma Volossenko (KAZ)	1
Sudaporn Seesondee (THA)	4
Pavitra (IND)	2
Huswatun Hasanah (INA)	3
Yang Wenlu (CHN)	2
Oh Yeon-ji (KOR)	3
Shoira Zulkaynarova (TJK)	0
Choe Hye-song (PRK)	5

Semifinals
Sudaporn Seesondee (THA)	5
Huswatun Hasanah (INA)	0
Oh Yeon-ji (KOR)	5
Choe Hye-song (PRK)	0

Final
Sudaporn Seesondee (THA)	1
Oh Yeon-ji (KOR)	4
