= Jajaira Gonzalez =

American boxer (born 1997)

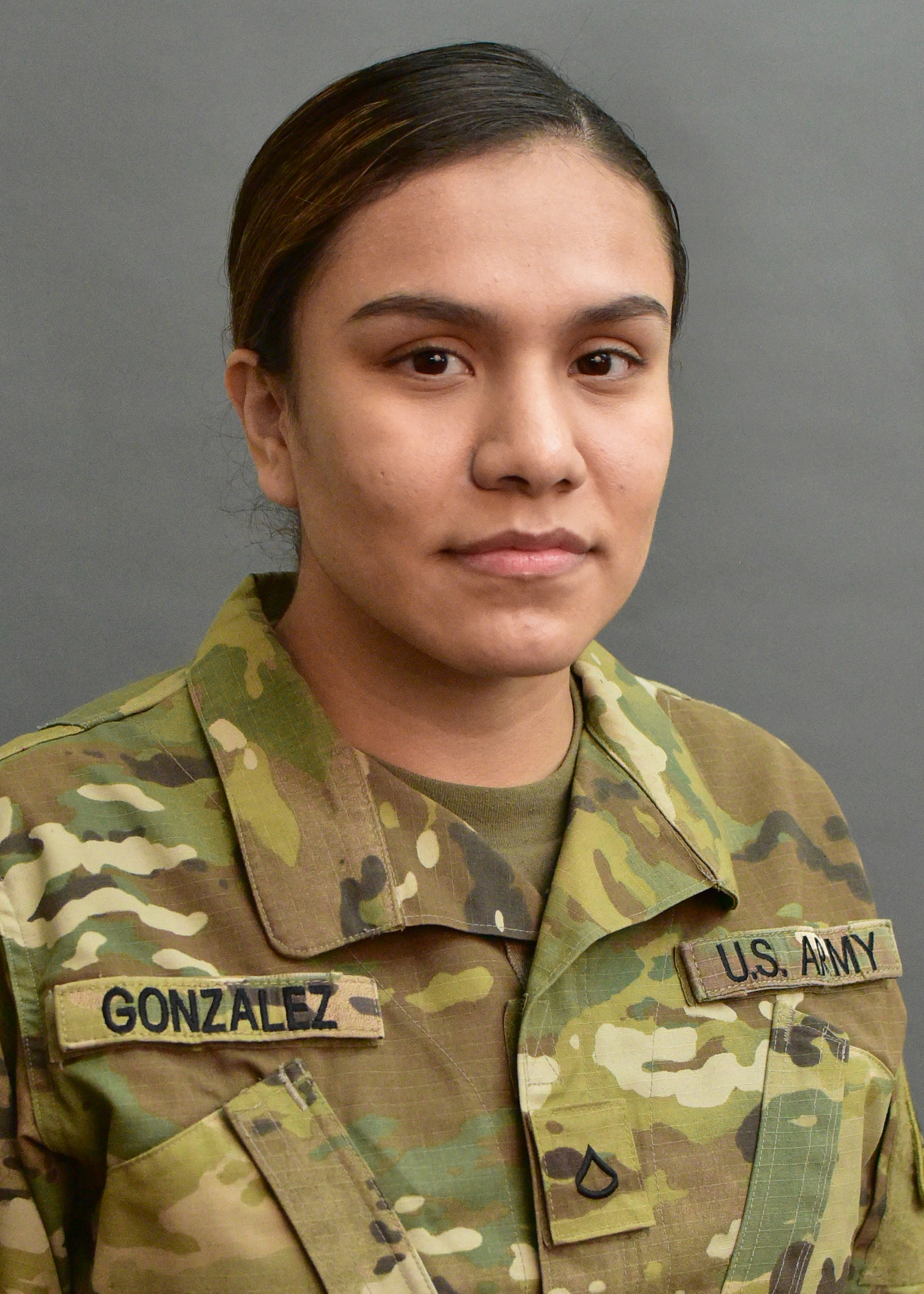
- Gonzalez in 2018
- Born: February 13, 1997 (age 29); Glendora, California, U.S.
- Relatives: 3 siblings, including Joet
- Military career
- Allegiance: United States
- Branch: United States Army
- Service years: 2016–2018
- Rank: Private first class
- Boxing career
- Height: 163 cm (5 ft 4 in)
- Weight class: 60 kg / 132 lbs
- Stance: Orthodox

Boxing record
- Wins: 58
- Win by KO: 19
- Losses: 10
Medal record
Women's amateur boxing
Representing United States
Pan American Games
Bronze medal – third place	2023 Santiago	Women's 60 kg
Summer Youth Olympics
Gold medal – first place	2014 Nanjing	Women's 60 kg
Youth and Junior World Boxing Championships
Gold medal – first place	2014 Sofia	Women's 60 kg
Gold medal – first place	2013 Albena	Women's 57 kg

Jajaira Gonzalez (Spanish: [ɟʝaˈxajɾa]; born February 13, 1997) is a Mexican American boxer. She won a bronze medal at the 2023 Pan American Games in the women's 60 kg boxing event, and she represented the United States in that category at the 2024 Summer Olympics.

== Career ==
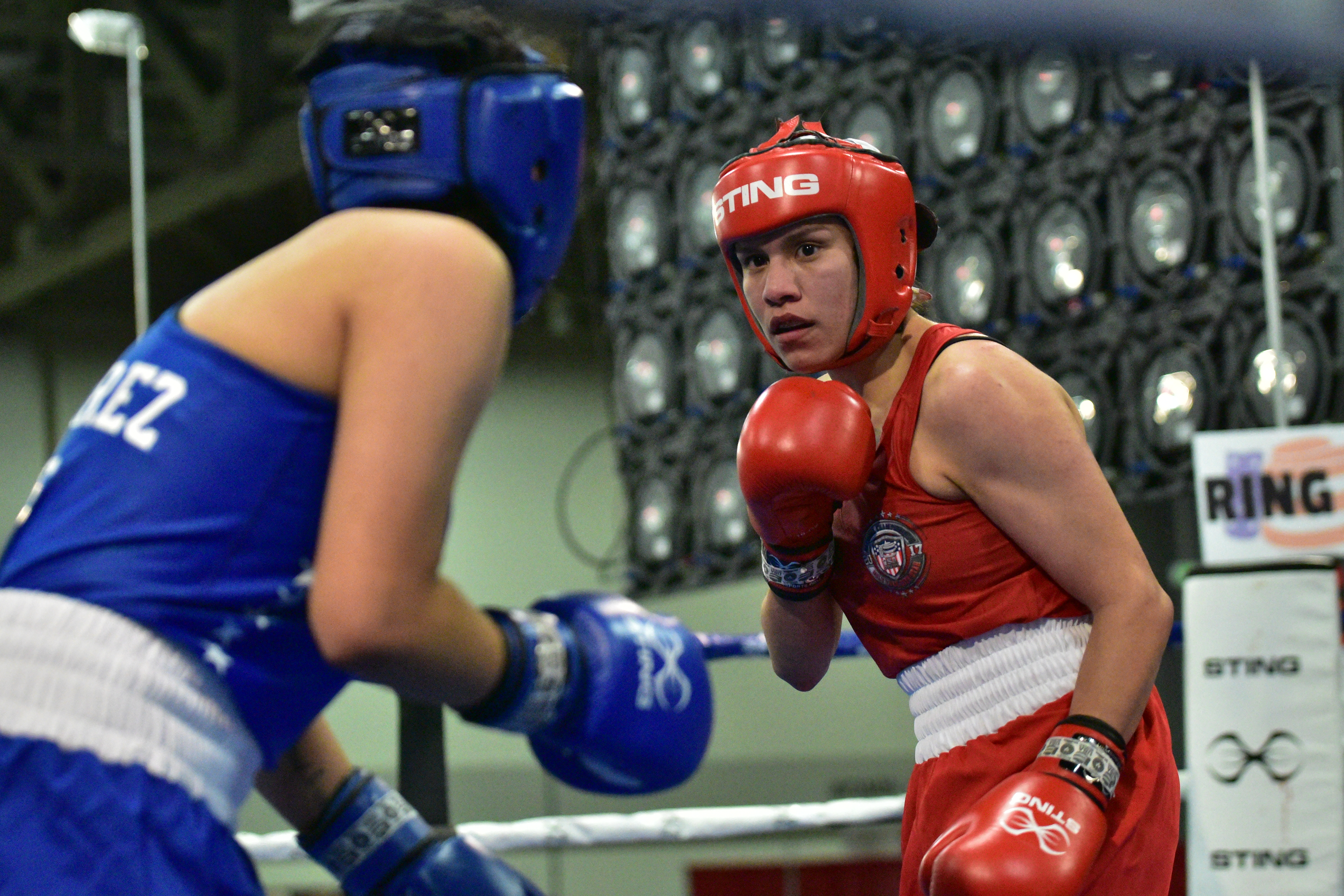
Gonzalez (right) boxing Lupe Gutierrez in 2017

Gonzalez was born in Glendora, California, and was a promising young boxer as a teenager, winning the 2014 Youth Olympic Games, a Junior World Championship, and two Youth World Championships. Her career took a downward turn in 2015, however, when she narrowly missed out on representing the U.S. at the 2016 Summer Olympics in Rio de Janeiro by losing the final fight for a spot on the American team by a narrow decision. Gonzalez subsequently quit competitive boxing for four years, moved across America, and spent a period in the Army's boxing program. After losing her spot on the U.S. team in an upset defeat at the 2018 national championships, she ended up working in a Virginia kickboxing gym.

In 2021, Gonzalez returned to the sport after she saw former USA Boxing teammates' social media posts about traveling to Spain for competitions. She tried to drop down to the 57 kg (125 lbs) category and qualify for the U.S. national team, but ultimately lost out to Alyssa Mendoza for a spot after falling in the quarterfinals of a February 2023 tournament in Bulgaria. However, USA Boxing then asked if Gonzalez would be interested in becoming its number-two 60 kg fighter behind Rashida Ellis. She accepted, and when Ellis later left USA Boxing, Gonzalez became the country's leading lightweight contender.

Gonzalez won a bronze medal at the 2023 Pan American Games and qualified for the women's 60 kg event at the 2024 Summer Olympics in Paris. USA Boxing head coach Billy Walsh called her return to form "like Lazarus coming back from the dead." At the Paris Olympics, she bested the French 2016 Olympic gold medalist Estelle Mossely in the Round of 32. Despite competing in front of a Parisian crowd that booed her throughout much of the match, Gonzalez beat Mossely in a 4‍–‍0 unanimous decision. She moved on to face 2020 silver medalist and professional boxer Beatriz Ferreira in the Round of 16. Although only losing the first round 2–3 on the judges' scorecards, Gonzalez was ultimately defeated by the Brazilian Ferreira in an overall unanimous decision, ending Gonzalez's run at the 2024 Olympics.

== Personal life ==
Gonzalez is the sister of professional boxers Jousce, JonJairo, and Joet Gonzalez, as well as another brother named Jason. She previously dated 2016 Olympic silver medalist Shakur Stevenson, who won the 2019 WBO featherweight title by defeating Jajaira's brother Joet.
