= 2019 AIBA Women's World Boxing Championships – Lightweight =

Lightweight at the 2019 AIBA Women's World Boxing Championships
- Venue: FSK Sports Complex
- Location: Ulan-Ude, Russia
- Dates: 4–13 October
- Competitors: 35 from 35 nations

Medalists
| gold medal | Beatriz Ferreira | Brazil |
| silver medal | Wang Cong | China |
| bronze medal | Rashida Ellis | United States |
| bronze medal | Mira Potkonen | Finland |

The Lightweight competition at the 2019 AIBA Women's World Boxing Championships was held between 4 and 13 October 2019.

== Schedule ==
The schedule was as follows:

| Date | Time | Round |
|---|---|---|
| Friday 4 October 2019 | 18:45 | Round of 64 |
| Sunday 6 October 2019 | 18:00 | Round of 32 |
| Wednesday 9 October 2019 | 13:30; 18:30 | Round of 16 |
| Thursday 10 October 2019 | 19:00 | Quarterfinals |
| Saturday 12 October 2019 | 19:00 | Semifinals |
| Sunday 13 October 2019 | After 16:00 | Final |

All times are Irkutsk Time (UTC+8)

== Results ==
=== Finals ===
Semifinals
(Finland) Mira Potkonen | 1
(China) Wang Cong | 4
(Brazil) Beatriz Ferreira | 4
(United States) Rashida Ellis | 1

Final
(China) Wang Cong | 0
(Brazil) Beatriz Ferreira | 5

=== Top half ===
==== Section 1 ====
Round of 64

| | Score | |
|---|---|---|
| Huswatun Hasanah (Indonesia) | 0–5 | (Switzerland) Sandra Brugger |

Round of 32
(Finland) Mira Potkonen | KO
(Switzerland) Sandra Brugger
(France) Amina Zidani | 2
(Ecuador) Marie Palacios | 3
(Republic of Ireland) Amy Broadhurst | 5
(Germany) Maya Kleinhans | 0
(Poland) Aneta Rygielska | 5
(Belarus) Ala Yarshevich | 0

Round of 16
(Finland) Mira Potkonen | 5
(Ecuador) Marie Palacios | 0
(Republic of Ireland) Amy Broadhurst | 5
(Poland) Aneta Rygielska | 0

Quarterfinals
(Finland) Mira Potkonen | 5
(Republic of Ireland) Amy Broadhurst | 0

==== Section 2 ====
Round of 32
(Chinese Taipei) Wu Shih-yi | 3
(Canada) Irène Fiolek | 2
(China) Wang Cong | 5
(Sweden) Agnes Alexiusson | 0
(Uzbekistan) Raykhona Kodirova | 5
(Lithuania) Ana Starovoitova | 0
(Mongolia) Monkhoryn Namuun | 4
(Turkey) Sema Çalışkan | 1

Round of 16
(Chinese Taipei) Wu Shih-yi | 0
(China) Wang Cong | 5
(Uzbekistan) Raykhona Kodirova | 1
(Mongolia) Monkhoryn Namuun | 4

Quarterfinals
(China) Wang Cong | 5
(Mongolia) Monkhoryn Namuun | 0

=== Bottom half ===
==== Section 3 ====
Round of 64

| | Score | |
|---|---|---|
| Natalia Shadrina (Russia) | 4–1 | (Algeria) Imane Khelif |

Round of 32
(India) Laishram Sarita Devi | 0
(Russia) Natalia Shadrina | 5
(Colombia) Dayana Cordero | w/o
(Democratic Republic of the Congo) Naomie Yumba
(Brazil) Beatriz Ferreira | RSC
(Botswana) Keamogetse Kenosi
(Venezuela) Omailyn Alcala | 3
(Tajikistan) Shoira Zulkaynarova | 2

Round of 16
(Russia) Natalia Shadrina | 5
(Colombia) Dayana Cordero | 0
(Brazil) Beatriz Ferreira | 5
(Venezuela) Omailyn Alcala | 0

Quarterfinals
(Russia) Natalia Shadrina | 2
(Brazil) Beatriz Ferreira | 3

==== Section 4 ====
Round of 64

| | Score | |
|---|---|---|
| Anja Stridsman (Australia) | 5–0 | (Japan) Tomoko Kugimiya |

Round of 32
(Argentina) Dayana Sánchez | 0
(Italy) Francesca Amato | 5
(Panama) Elisa Williams
(United States) Rashida Ellis | RSC
(Kazakhstan) Rimma Volossenko | 5
(England) Paige Murney | 0
(Australia) Anja Stridsman | 0
(Thailand) Sudaporn Seesondee | 5

Round of 16
(Italy) Francesca Amato | 0
(United States) Rashida Ellis | 5
(Kazakhstan) Rimma Volossenko | 1
(Thailand) Sudaporn Seesondee | 4

Quarterfinals
(United States) Rashida Ellis | 4
(Thailand) Sudaporn Seesondee | 1
