= Darwin Pérez =

Chilean footballer

Personal information
- Full name: Darwin Eduardo Pérez Curiñanco
- Date of birth: 8 May 1977 (age 49)
- Place of birth: Concepción, Chile
- Height: 1.72 m (5 ft 8 in)
- Position: Right wing-back

Youth career
- Deportes Concepción

Senior career*
Years	Team	Apps	(Gls)
1994–2000	Deportes Concepción	73	(0)
2000	→ Universidad de Concepción (loan)		(0)
2001	Deportes Concepción	23	(2)
2002–2003	Rangers	32	(3)
2003	PSM Makassar		(0)
2004	PSIS Semarang		(1)
2005	Deportes Puerto Montt	18	(1)
2006	Fernández Vial		(3)
2007–2009	Deportes Concepción	55	(0)
Total			(10)

International career
2001	Chile	1	(0)
- * Club domestic league appearances and goals

Darwin Eduardo Pérez Curiñanco (born 8 May 1977) is a Chilean former professional footballer who played as a right wing-back for clubs in Chile and Indonesia.

== Club career ==
A product of Deportes Concepción youth system, he made his professional debut in the 1994 Segunda División, winning the league title and getting the promotion to the top division. He was with the club until 2000, when he was loaned to Universidad de Concepción until the end of his contract, due to disagreement with the coach, Oscar Garré.

The next season, he returned to Deportes Concepción, taking part in the 2001 Copa Libertadores. In his homeland, he also played for Rangers de Talca and Deportes Puerto Montt in the top division and for Fernández Vial in the second division.

Abroad, he played in Indonesia for PSM Makassar and PSIS Semarang between 2003 and 2004.

His last club was Deportes Concepción from 2007 to 2009.

== International career ==
Pérez represented Chile in the 2002 FIFA World Cup qualifier against Ecuador on 14 November 2001. Previously, he represented Chile at both under-20 and under-23 levels.

== Personal life ==
Pérez is of Mapuche descent and his maternal surname, Curiñanco, means "black condor" in Mapudungun.

== Honours ==
Deportes Concepción

- Segunda División de Chile: 1994
