= Boxing at the 2023 Pan American Games – Women's 60 kg =

Women's 60 kg at the 2023 Pan American Games
- Venue: Olympic Training Center
- Start date: October 19, 2023
- End date: October 27, 2023
- Competitors: 12 from 12 nations

Medalists
Gold medal	Beatriz Ferreira	Brazil
Silver medal	Angie Valdés	Colombia
Bronze medal	Jajaira Gonzalez	United States
Bronze medal	María José Palacios	Ecuador

The Women's 60 kg competition of the boxing events at the 2023 Pan American Games in Santiago, Chile, was held between October 19 and 27 at the Olympic Training Center. A total of 12 boxers from 12 NOC's competed.

The four semifinalists will qualify for the 2024 Summer Olympics in Paris, France.

== Qualification ==
There was a quota of 130 boxers to compete at the games (ten per event). The host nation (Chile) received automatic qualification spots for all events. The remainder of the spots were awarded through various qualifying tournaments. However, the International Olympic Committee later decided the competition was an open registration event, meaning any NOC could enter a boxer into the event.

== Competition format ==
Like all Pan American boxing events, the competition is a straight single-elimination tournament. Both semifinal losers are awarded bronze medals, so no boxers compete again after their first loss. Bouts consist of 3 rounds "10-point must" scoring system used, where the winner of each round must be awarded 10 points and the loser a lesser amount, and the elimination of the padded headgear. Five judges scored each bout. The winner will be the boxer who scored the most at the end of the match.

== Results ==
Round of 16
Tianna Guy (TTO)	0
Angie Valdés (COL)	5
Jessica Muñoz (DOM)	0
Victoria Saputo (ARG)	5
Jajaira Gonzalez (USA)	RSC
Garinder Takhar (CAN)
Esmeralda Falcón (MEX)	0
Beatriz Ferreira (BRA)	5

Quarterfinals
Krisandy Ríos (VEN)	1
Angie Valdés (COL)	3
Victoria Saputo (ARG)	0
María José Palacios (ECU)	5
Camila Piñeiro (URU)	0
Jajaira Gonzalez (USA)	5
Beatriz Ferreira (BRA)	RSC
Pamela Sánchez (CRC)

Semifinals
Angie Valdés (COL)	4
María José Palacios (ECU)	1
Jajaira Gonzalez (USA)	1
Beatriz Ferreira (BRA)	4

Final
Angie Valdés (COL)	0
Beatriz Ferreira (BRA)	5
