= Kellie Harrington =

Irish boxer (born 1989)

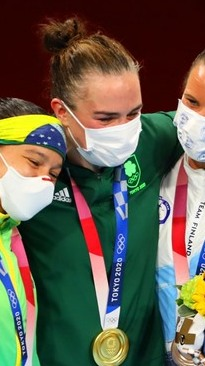
- Harrington (centre) at the 2020 Summer Olympics podium

Personal information
- Full name: Kellie Anne Harrington
- Nationality: Irish
- Born: 11 December 1989 (age 36) Dublin, Ireland

Sport
- Sport: Boxing
- Weight class: Lightweight (60 kg); Light welterweight (64 kg)
- Club: St Mary's Boxing Club (Tallaght, Dublin)
Medal record
Women's amateur boxing
Representing Ireland
Olympic Games
| Gold medal – first place | 2024 Paris | Lightweight |
| Gold medal – first place | 2020 Tokyo | Lightweight |
World Championships
| Gold medal – first place | 2018 New Delhi | Lightweight |
| Silver medal – second place | 2016 Astana | Light welterweight |
European Games
| Gold medal – first place | 2023 Kraków-Małopolska | Lightweight |
| Silver medal – second place | 2019 Minsk | Lightweight |
European Championships
| Bronze medal – third place | 2024 Belgrade | Lightweight |
| Gold medal – first place | 2022 Budva | Lightweight |
| Bronze medal – third place | 2018 Sofia | Lightweight |
European Union Championships
| Silver medal – second place | 2017 Cascia | Lightweight |

Kellie Anne Harrington (born 11 December 1989) is an Irish amateur boxer. During her career she was double Olympic gold medalist, winning at Tokyo 2020 and Paris 2024, and 2018 World champion. Harrington also won gold medals at the 2023 European Games and European Championship.

== Career ==
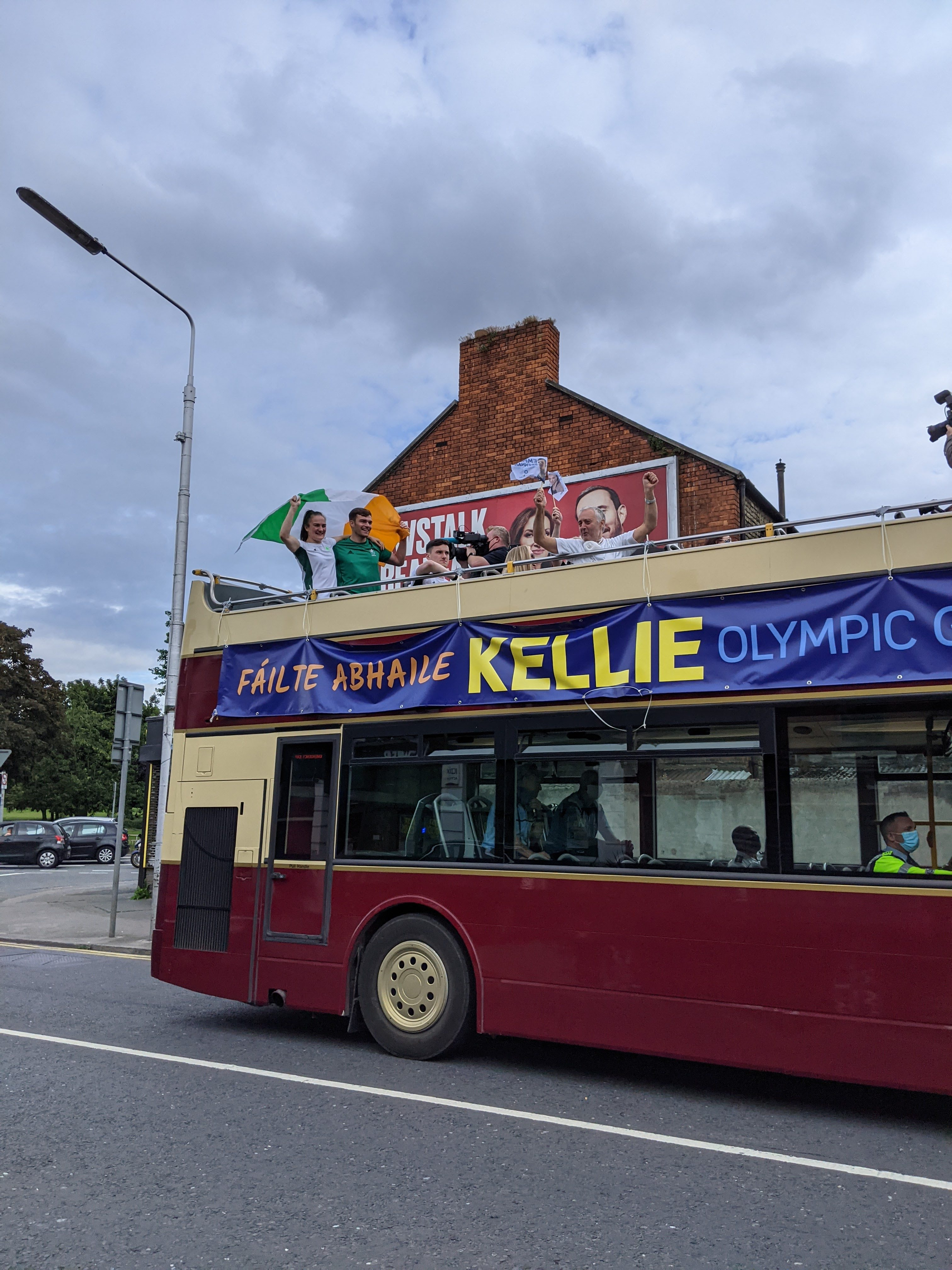
Harrington and Emmet Brennan returning from the 2020 Olympics

She won a silver medal in the lightweight division at the 2017 Women's European Union Boxing Championships and a bronze at the 2018 Women's European Boxing Championships.

She won the gold medal in the lightweight division at the 2018 Women's World Boxing Championships. She was the silver medallist in the light welterweight division at the 2016 Women's World Boxing Championships.

=== 2020 Summer Olympics ===
Harrington won the 2020 European Boxing Olympic Qualification Tournament, by defeating Caroline Dubois on a split decision in the final.

Harrington was part of the Ireland team at the 2020 Summer Olympics. She was one of the flag bearers for Ireland at the opening ceremony on 23 July. She competed in the lightweight division of the boxing competition. In her first fight, she defeated Rebecca Nicoli 5–0 to advance to the quarter-finals, where she then defeated Imane Khelif 5–0 to guarantee at least a bronze medal. In her semi-final on 5 August, Harrington defeated Sudaporn Seesondee 3–2 to advance to the final. In her final on 8 August, Harrington defeated Beatriz Ferreira 5–0, winning the gold medal and becoming Ireland's third Olympic boxing champion. President Michael D. Higgins, Taoiseach Micheál Martin congratulated Harrington on her win, along with Katie Taylor and Michael Carruth.

=== 2023 European Games ===
Harrington won gold at the 2023 European Games in Poland, defeating Natalia Shadrina from Serbia in the final by unanimous decision.

=== 2024 Summer Olympics ===
At the 2024 Summer Olympics in Paris, Harrington was given a bye into the second round, where she defeated Italy's Alessia Mesiano by unanimous decision. In the third round she secured another unanimous decision win, this time over Angie Valdés from Colombia. Harrington defeated Brazil's Beatriz Ferreira by 4:1 split decision in the semi-finals. In the final she defeated Yang Wenlu from China on a 4:1 split decision and took the gold medal. This made her the first Irish boxer to win consecutive Olympic gold medals. After the fight Harrington announced her retirement from boxing, but later announced her return in October 2025.

== Recognition ==
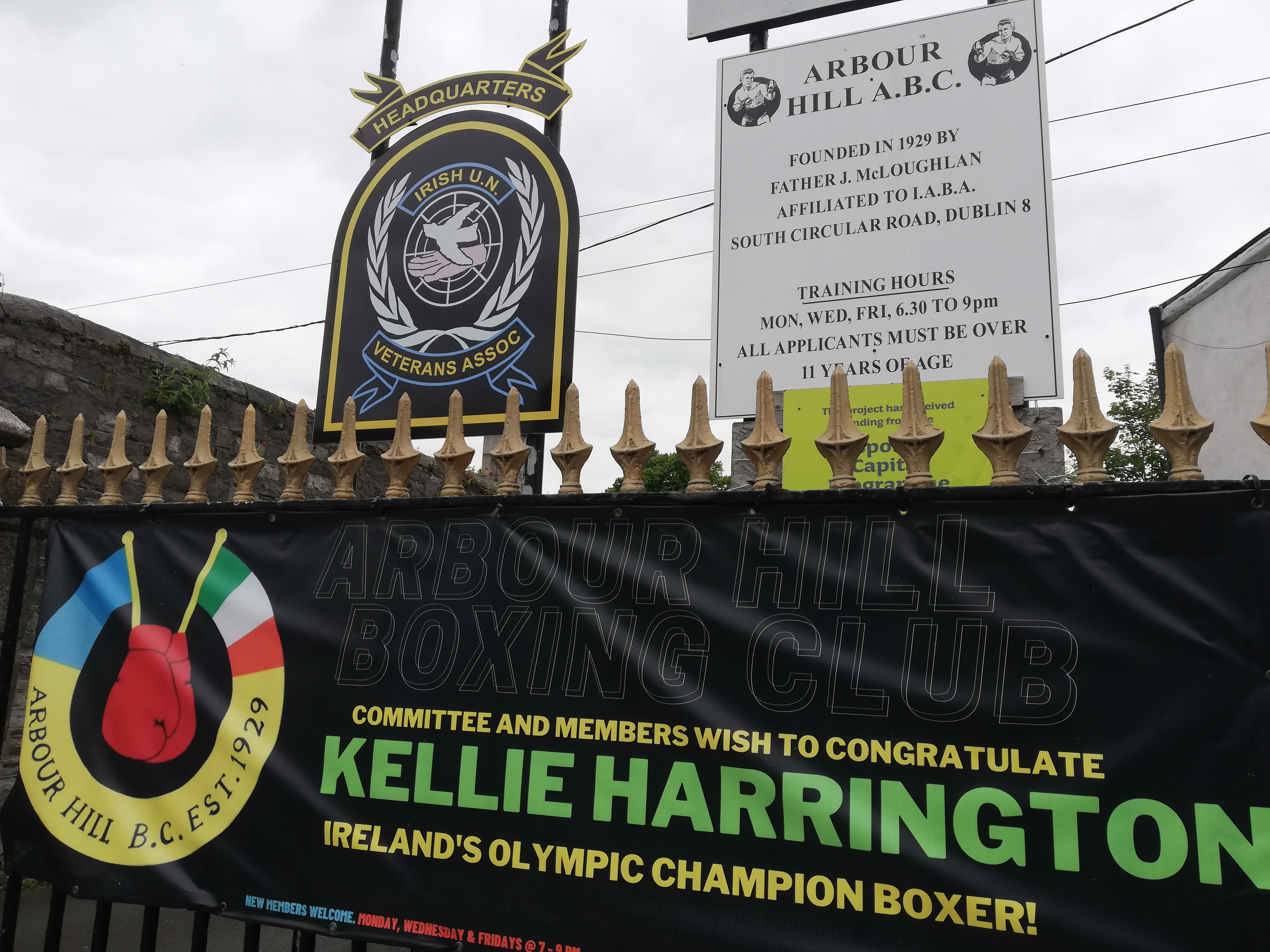
Banner in support of Harrington, Arbour Hill

For International Women's Day in 2022, An Post launched a stamp collection of Irish sportswomen which featured Harrington and others.

Harrington was joint grand marshal with Ellen Keane at the Dublin St Patrick's Day parade on 17 March 2022.

In 2022, she was awarded the freedom of Dublin city.

== Personal life ==
Harrington is from Dublin's north inner city and is a member of St. Mary's Boxing Club, Tallaght. At age 15, she developed an interest in boxing, and attempted to join the local boxing club, only to be told that they would not accept girls. But Harrington persisted, was eventually admitted, and made rapid progress in her boxing career.

She has stated that she intends to return to her part-time cleaning job at St Vincent's Psychiatric Hospital in Dublin, regardless of her result at the Olympics.

Harrington is a lesbian and been in a relationship with Mandy Loughlin since 2009 after meeting her through boxing, and was one of at least 180 openly gay athletes at the 2020 Olympic Games. Harrington and Loughlin married in Dublin on 8 April 2022.

In October 2022, Harrington released her autobiography called Kellie which was written with Roddy Doyle.

On 2 April 2023, Harrington announced her withdrawal from social media following a backlash as a result of a tweet from GB News relating to immigration, which she shared and subsequently deleted. She called her decision a "lifestyle choice" after "coming across a lot of negative stuff". She refused to address the issue in a subsequent Newstalk interview, but later issued a statement and an apology.
