= Angie Valdés =

Colombian boxer (born 2000)

Personal information
- Born: Angie Paola Valdés Pana; 14 July 2000 (age 25) Barranquilla, Colombia
- Height: 5 ft 5 in (165 cm)

Sport
- Sport: Boxing
- Weight class: Lightweight
Medal record
Representing Colombia
Women's amateur boxing
IBA World Championships
| Silver medal – second place | 2023 New Delhi | Lightweight |
Pan American Games
| Silver medal – second place | 2023 Santiago | Lightweight |
Central American and Caribbean Games
| Gold medal – first place | 2023 San Salvador | Lightweight |
South American Games
| Gold medal – first place | 2022 Asunción | Lightweight |
Bolivarian Games
| Gold medal – first place | 2022 Valledupar | Lightweight |

Angie Paola Valdés Pana (born 14 July 2000) is a Colombian boxer. She won the silver medal in the lightweight division at the 2023 IBA Women's World Boxing Championships. Competing in the 60 kg category, Valdés won gold medals at the 2023 Central American and Caribbean Games, 2022 South American Games and 2022 Bolivarian Games as well as silver at the 2023 Pan American Games. She also represented her country at the 2024 Summer Olympics, losing in the quarter-finals to Ireland's eventual gold medalist Kellie Harrington.
