= 1994 Campeonato Nacional Segunda División =

Segunda División
- Season: 1994
- Champions: Deportes Concepción
- Promoted: Deportes Concepción; Huachipato
- Relegated: Lota Schwager
- Top goalscorer: Andrés Roldán (Arturo Fernandez Vial; 16 goals)

The 1994 Segunda División de Chile was the 43rd season of the Segunda División de Chile.

Deportes Concepción was the tournament's champion.

== Aggregate table ==
Pos	Team	Pld	W	D	L	GF	GA	GD	Pts	Promotion or relegation
1	Deportes Concepción	30	17	8	5	46	20	+26	42	Promoted to 1995 Primera División de Chile
2	Huachipato	30	15	9	6	42	26	+16	39	Promoted
3	Fernández Vial	30	11	14	5	48	38	+10	36	Qualified to promotion playoffs
4	Colchagua	30	14	8	8	38	28	+10	36	Qualified to promotion playoffs
5	Deportes Ovalle	30	13	9	8	34	24	+10	35	
6	Unión Santa Cruz	30	12	7	11	37	33	+4	31	
7	Audax Italiano	30	11	8	11	48	54	−6	30	
8	Deportes Iquique	30	11	7	12	50	45	+5	29	
9	Deportes Arica	30	10	9	11	37	43	−6	29	
10	Santiago Wanderers	30	9	10	11	48	43	+5	28	
11	Ñublense	30	10	8	12	36	39	−3	28	
12	Deportes Puerto Montt	30	8	11	11	38	42	−4	27	
13	Deportes Melipilla	30	9	8	13	31	44	−13	26	
14	Unión San Felipe	30	7	9	14	30	47	−17	23	
15	Unión La Calera	30	6	9	15	24	39	−15	21	
16	Lota Schwager	30	6	8	16	23	45	−22	20	Relegated to 1995 Tercera División de Chile

Source: rsssf.com

== See also ==
- Chilean football league system
