= Hadjila Khelif =

Algerian boxer (born 1997)

Hadjila Dounia Khelif
Personal information
- Nationality: Algerian
- Born: 1 September 1997 (age 29) Sidi Aïch, Algeria

Boxing career

Hadjila Khelif (born 1 September 1997) is an Algerian boxer. She competed in the women's 60kg event at the 2024 Summer Olympics, where she lost in the Round of 16 to Natalia Šadrina.
