= María José Palacios =

Ecuadorian boxer (born 1998)

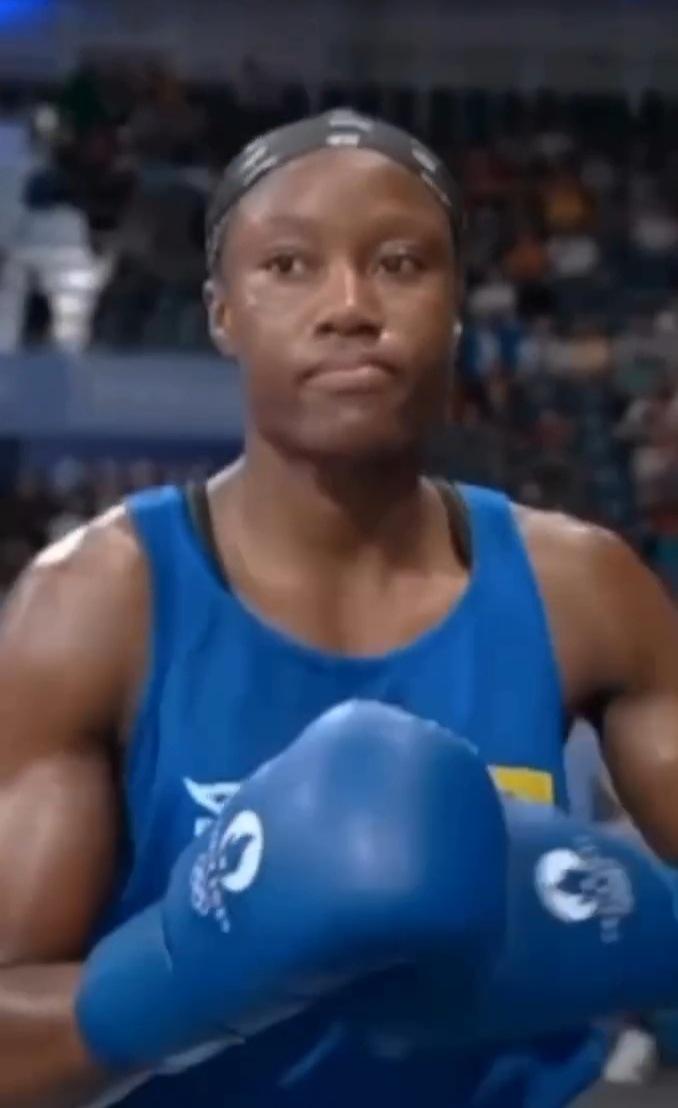

Personal information
- Nationality: Ecuadorian
- Born: 18 October 1998 (age 28)

Sport
- Sport: Boxing
Medal record
Women's amateur boxing
Representing Ecuador
Pan American Games
Bronze medal – third place	2023 Santiago	Lightweight
South American Games
Bronze medal – third place	2026 Santa Fe	65 kg

María José Palacios Espinoza (born 18 October 1998) is an Ecuadorian boxer. She competed in the women's lightweight event at the 2020 Summer Olympics.
