= Sudaporn Seesondee =

Thai boxer (born 1991)

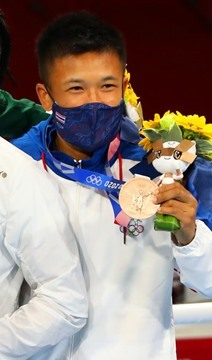
- Seesondee in 2021

Personal information
- Born: October 4, 1991 (age 34) Chai Wan District, Udon Thani Province, Thailand

Sport
- Country: Thailand
- Sport: Boxing
Medal record
Women's Amateur Boxing
Representing Thailand
Olympic Games
Bronze medal – third place	2020 Tokyo	Lightweight
World Championships
Silver medal – second place	2018 New Delhi	Lightweight
Bronze medal – third place	2014 Jeju City	Light welterweight
Asian Games
Silver medal – second place	2018 Jakarta	Lightweight

Sudaporn Seesondee (Thai: สุดาพร สีสอนดี, born 4 October 1991) is a Thai boxer. She won the silver medal in the women's 60 kg event at the 2018 Asian Games held in Jakarta, Indonesia. She won the bronze medal in the women's lightweight event at the 2020 Summer Olympics held in Tokyo, Japan. She is the first Thai woman to win an Olympic boxing medal.

== Biography ==
Sudaporn (nicknamed: Taew) was born into a boxing family. Her father owns a Muay Thai gym, so she practiced Muay Thai since childhood. She first started boxing with Muay Thai at the age of 11. She became a professional Muay Thai boxer and then switched to amateur boxing for many years, becoming a national team athlete when she was only 16 years old.

At the 2018 AIBA Women's World Boxing Championships held in New Delhi, India, she won the silver medal in the lightweight event.

The 2020 Summer Olympics in Tokyo, Japan were her first Summer Olympics and she lost the semi-final in a close fight in a split decision 2:3 against her to Kellie Harrington in the women's lightweight event. She then went on to win the bronze medal.

The Royal Thai Navy (RTN) has promoted her to a Sub-Lieutenant from her former position as only a volunteer in the Royal Thai Paramilitary Force.
