= Rashida Ellis =

American boxer

Personal information
- Born: June 4, 1995 (age 31) Lynn, Massachusetts, U.S.

Boxing career
- Weight class: Lightweight
Medal record
Women's amateur boxing
Representing the United States
World Championships
Gold medal – first place	2022 Istanbul	Lightweight
Bronze medal – third place	2019 Ulan-Ude	Lightweight
Pan American Games
Bronze medal – third place	2019 Lima	Lightweight

Rashida Ellis is an American boxer.

She won a medal at the 2019 AIBA Women's World Boxing Championships.

She represented the United States at the 2020 Summer Olympics. She is openly lesbian.

== Personal life ==
Her older brother, Rashidi Ellis is also a professional boxer.

== Professional boxing record ==
1 fight	1 win	0 losses
By decision	1	0

No.	Result	Record	Opponent	Type	Round, time	Date	Location	Notes
1	Win	1–0	Maria Salinas	UD	8	Oct 10, 2025	Commerce Casino, Commerce, California, U.S.	
