= Beatriz Ferreira =

Brazilian boxer (born 1992)

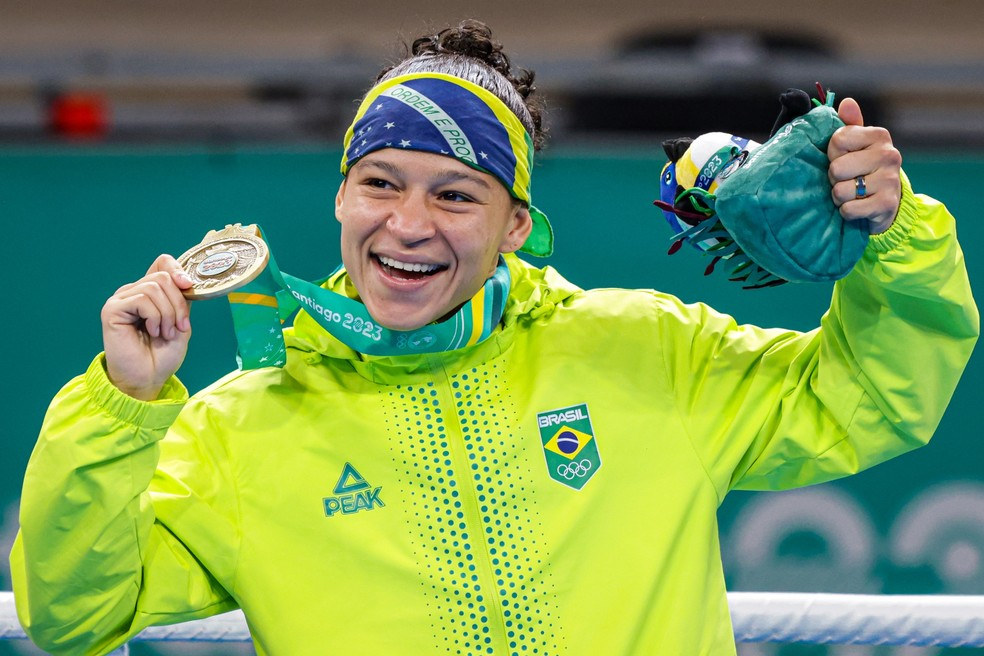
- Ferreira at the 2023 Pan American Games

Personal information
- Nickname: The Beast
- Born: Beatriz Iasmin Soares Ferreira; 9 December 1992 (age 33) Salvador, Bahia, Brazil
- Height: 5 ft 4 in (163 cm)
- Weight: Lightweight

Boxing career
- Stance: Orthodox

Boxing record
- Total fights: 9
- Wins: 8
- Win by KO: 2
- Losses: 1
Medal record
Women's Amateur boxing
Representing Brazil
Olympic Games
Silver medal – second place	2020 Tokyo	Lightweight
Bronze medal – third place	2024 Paris	Lightweight
World Championships
Gold medal – first place	2019 Ulan-Ude	Lightweight
Gold medal – first place	2023 New Delhi	Lightweight
Silver medal – second place	2022 Istanbul	Lightweight
Pan American Games
Gold medal – first place	2019 Lima	Lightweight
Gold medal – first place	2023 Santiago	Lightweight
South American Games
Gold medal – first place	2018 Cochabamba	Lightweight
World Military Championships
Gold medal – first place	2021 Moscow	Lightweight

Beatriz Iasmin Soares Ferreira ([beaˈtɾis feˈʁe(j)ɾɐ]; born 9 December 1992) is a Brazilian professional boxer. She held IBF lightweight title from April 2024 to December 2025.

Ferreira won the gold medal at the 2019 AIBA Women's World Boxing Championships, and the 2021 Moscow Military World Games in the up to 60 kg category.

She represented Brazil at the 2020 Summer Olympics, winning the silver medal in the women's lightweight event, the best performance by a Brazilian female boxer. Ferreira returned in the 2024 Summer Olympics, winning the bronze.

Ferreira won the vacant IBF female lightweight title with a technical knockout win over Yanina del Carmen Lescano on 27 April 2024.

She is the eldest of three daughters by a fellow boxer, Raimundo Ferreira, known as "Sergipe" and twice Brazilian champion and three times champion of their home state of Bahia. A fan of boxing from childhood, by the age of 15 she was already teaching the fight. As part of the Olympic Experience (Vivência Olímpica in Portuguese) program, Beatriz was the sparring of eventual medalist Adriana Araújo at the 2016 Summer Olympics in Rio.

== Medals and awards ==
=== National ===
- 2× Open Games of the Interior (2014 and 2015)
- 2× Paulista Champion (2016 and 2018)
- 4× Brazilian Champion (2017, 2018, 2020 and 2022)

=== International ===
- 2× Gold — World Championship (2019 and 2023)
- 1× Silver — World Championship (2022)
- 1× Silver — Olympic Games (2020)
- 3× Gold — Strandja Tournament (2019, 2021 and 2023)
- 2× Gold — Belgrade Winner Tournament (2017 and 2018)
- 1× Gold — Continental Elite Women (2017)
- 1× Gold — XI South American Games (2018)
- 1× Gold — Continental Elite Women (2018)
- 1× Gold — Balkan Tournament (2018)
- 1× Gold — Feliks Stamm Tournament (2019)
- 1× Gold — Grand Prix Ustí Nad Laben (2019)
- 1× Gold — Pan American Games (2019)
- 1× Gold — Selesian Tournament (2019)
- 1× Gold — Balkan Tournament (2020)
- 1× Gold — Cologne Worldcup (2021)
- 1× Gold — Military World Championship (2021)
- 1× Gold — Bosckai Tournament (2022)
- 1× Gold — Continental AMBC Elite (2022)
- 1× Gold — Grand Prix-Brazil (2022)
- 1× Silver — Elimination Pan American Games (2019)
- 1× Silver — 69th Strandja Tournament (2018)
- 1× Silver — Feliks Stamm Tournament (2018)
- 1× Bronze — Magomed-Salam Mackhachkala Tournament (2017)

=== Individual awards ===
- 2× Best Athlete in Brazil (2019 and 2023)
- Best athlete in the world by Aiba (2019)
- 3× Best Boxing Athlete by COB (2017, 2018 and 2019)

== Professional career ==
=== IBF lightweight champion ===
On 27 April 2024 at Exhibition Centre Liverpool in Liverpool, England, Ferreira defeated Yanina del Carmen Lescano via sixth-round technical decision to win the vacant IBF female lightweight title.

Ferreira made the first defense of her title against Licia Boudersa in Monte-Carlo, Monaco on 14 December 2024. Ferreira won the fight by unanimous decision.

Ferreira made the second defense of her title against Maria Ines Ferreyra at Caribe Royale Orlando, Florida, on 7 June 2025. She won by unanimous decision.

A unanimous decision win over Maira Moneo at ARCA Spaces in São Paulo on 27 September 2025, saw her retain her title for the third time.

Ferreira made the fourth defense of her championship against Elif Nur Turhan at Salle des Étoiles in Monte Carlo on 6 December 2025. She lost via stoppage in the fifth round.

== Professional boxing record ==
9 fights	8 wins	1 loss
By knockout	2	1
By decision	6	0

No.	Result	Record	Opponent	Type	Round, time	Date	Location	Notes
9	Loss	8–1	Elif Nur Turhan	TKO	5 (10)	6 Dec 2025	Salle des Etoiles, Monte Carlo, Monaco	Lost IBF female lightweight title
8	Win	8–0	Maira Moneo	UD	10	27 Sep 2025	ARCA Spaces, São Paulo, Brazil	Retained IBF female lightweight title
7	Win	7–0	Maria Ines Ferreyra	UD	10	7 Jun 2025	Caribe Royale Orlando, Orlando, Florida, U.S	Retained IBF female lightweight title
6	Win	6–0	Licia Boudersa	UD	10	14 Dec 2024	Salle des Étoiles, Monte Carlo, Monaco	Retained IBF female lightweight title
5	Win	5–0	Yanina del Carmen Lescano	TD	6 (10)	27 Apr 2024	Exhibition Centre, Liverpool, England	Won vacant IBF female lightweight title
4	Win	4–0	Destiny Jones	KO	8 (8)	9 Dec 2023	Chase Center, San Francisco, California, U.S.	
3	Win	3–0	Karla Ramos Zamora	PTS	8	1 Jul 2023	Sheffield Arena, Sheffield, England	
2	Win	2–0	Carisse Brown	TKO	2 (6)	3 Dec 2022	Gila River Arena, Glendale, Arizona, U.S.	
1	Win	1–0	Taynna Cardoso	UD	4	12 Nov 2022	Rocket Mortgage FieldHouse, Cleveland, Ohio, U.S.	

== See also ==
- List of female boxers

Sporting positions
World boxing titles
Vacant Title last held by Katie Taylor	IBF female lightweight champion April 27, 2024 – present	Incumbent
