= Wu Shih-yi =

Taiwanese boxer (born 1998)

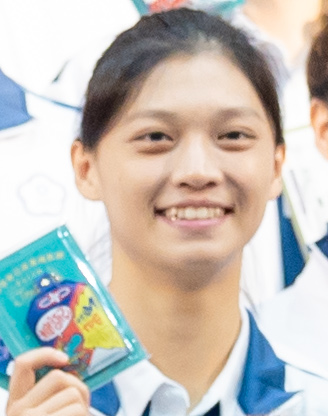
- Wu in 2024

Personal information
- Nationality: Taiwanese
- Born: 27 April 1998 (age 28) Taipei, Taiwan

Boxing career
- Weight class: Lightweight
Medal record
Women's amateur boxing
Representing Chinese Taipei
Olympic Games
Bronze medal – third place	2024 Paris	Lightweight
Asian Games
Bronze medal – third place	2022 Hangzhou	Lightweight
Asian Championships
Silver medal – second place	2019 Bangkok	Lightweight
Bronze medal – third place	2022 Amman	Lightweight

Wu Shih-yi (Chinese: 吳詩儀; born 27 April 1998) is a Taiwanese boxer.

Wu began boxing at the age of thirteen. Wu completed in boxing at the 2018 Asian Games in the women's 60 kg, losing to eventual silver medalist Sudaporn Seesondee. At the 2018 AIBA Women's World Boxing Championships, Wu contested as a lightweight, losing to Karina Ibragimova. Wu earned a silver medal at the 2019 Asian Amateur Boxing Championships in April, then lost to Wang Cong in the October 2019 AIBA Women's World Boxing Championships, which she contested as a lightweight. In March 2020, Wu qualified to represent Chinese Taipei in the 2020 Summer Olympics. Three years later, she qualified for the 2024 Summer Olympics.
