= Oh Yeon-ji =

South Korean boxer

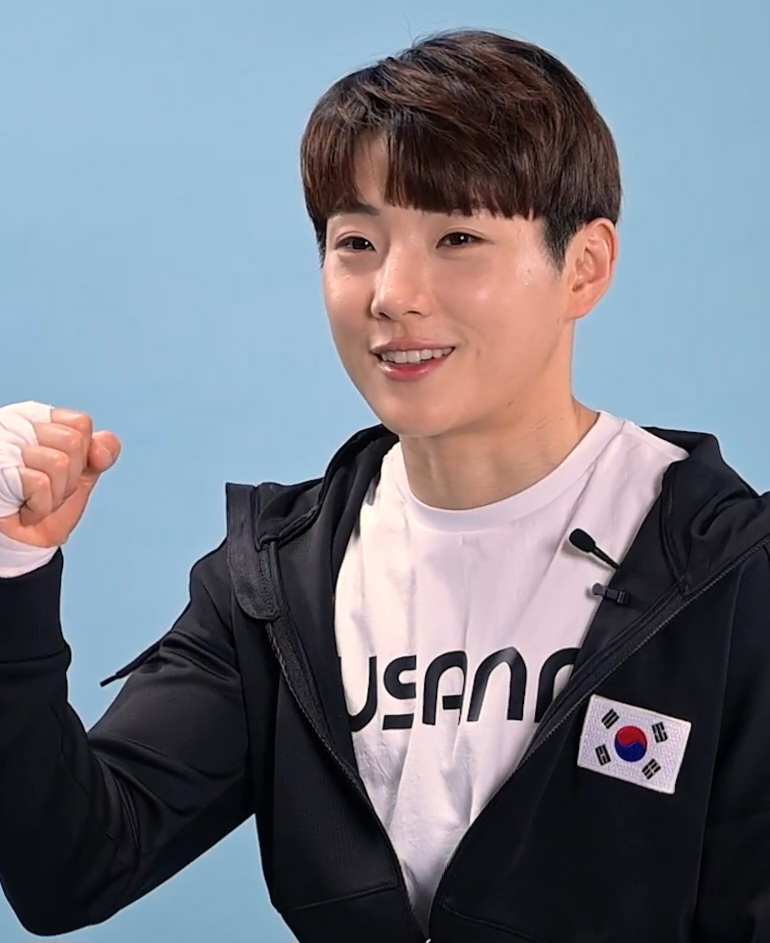

Personal information
- Nationality: South Korean
- Born: 4 August 1990 (age 36) Kunsan, South Korea

Boxing career
- Weight class: Lightweight
Medal record
Women's amateur boxing
Representing South Korea
World Championships
Bronze medal – third place	2018 New Delhi	Lightweight
Bronze medal – third place	2023 New Delhi	Lightweight
Asian Games
Gold medal – first place	2018 Jakarta-Palembang	Lightweight
Asian Championships
Gold medal – first place	2015 Wulanchabu	Lightweight
Gold medal – first place	2017 Ho Chi Minh City	Lightweight
Gold medal – first place	2022 Amman	Lightweight

Oh Yeon-ji is a South Korean amateur boxer. She competed at the 2020 Summer Olympics in Tokyo, Japan.
