= Yang Wenlu =

Chinese boxer (born 1991)

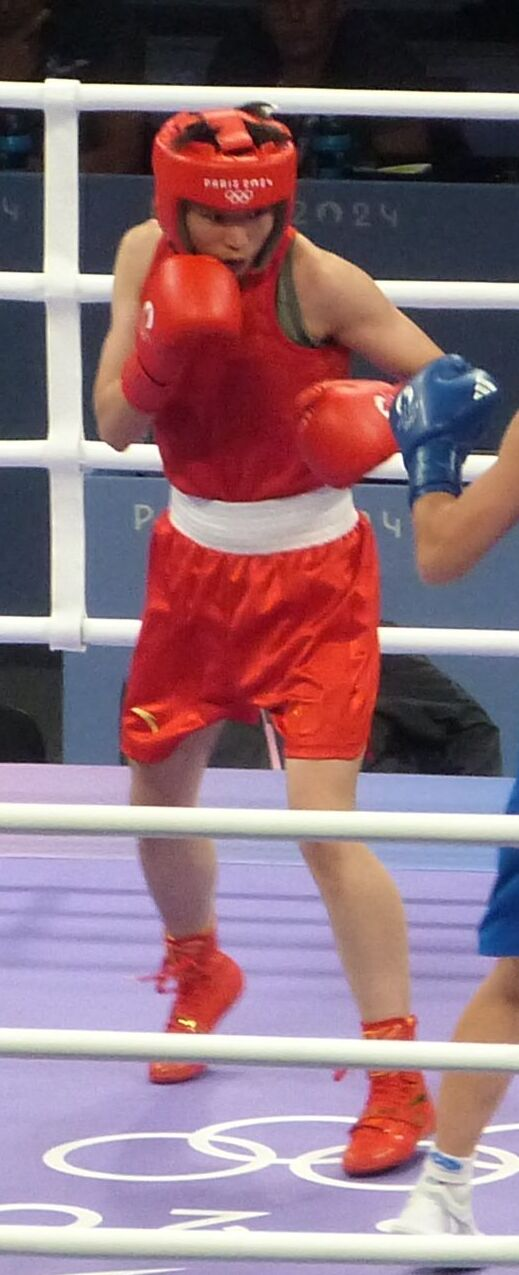
- Yang in 2024

Personal information
- Born: January 13, 1991 (age 35) Juye County, China
- Height: 173 cm (5 ft 8 in)

Chinese name
- Traditional Chinese: 楊文璐
- Simplified Chinese: 杨文璐
Transcriptions
Standard Mandarin
- Hanyu Pinyin: Yáng Wénlù
- IPA: [jǎŋ wə̌n.lû]

Boxing career
Medal record
Women's amateur boxing
Representing China
Olympic Games
Silver medal – second place	2024 Paris	Welterweight
World Championships
Bronze medal – third place	2023 New Delhi	Lightweight
Asian Games
Gold medal – first place	2022 Hangzhou	Lightweight

Yang Wenlu (Chinese: 杨文璐; born 13 January 1991) is a Chinese boxer. She won gold at the 2016 World Championships and the 2022 Asian Games.

== Early life and education ==
Yang was born 13 January 1991. She attended the Ocean University of China, then in 2019, pursued a master's degree from the Shanghai University of Sport.

== Career ==
Yang began her career in 2015 competing in the 64 kg category. Her first year, she won gold at the Asian Amateur Boxing Championships in Ulanqab and came in third at the Strandja Memorial in Sofia. The following year, she placed first at the Strandja Memorial and the World Championships in Astana, Kazakhstan.

In 2017, Yang switched to the Lightweight category and came in fifth at the Asian Championships in Ho Chi Minh City. The following year, she came in fifth at both the 2018 Asian Games in Jakarta and the Asian Championships in Bangkok, though she took first at the 2019 Asian Championships.

Yang did not participate in major competitions again until 2023. That year, she came in third at the World Championships in New Delhi, second at the Standja Memorial, and first at the Asian Games in Hangzhou.

== Honors ==
The General Administration of Sport of China named Yang an Elite Athlete of National Class in 2011, then an Elite Athlete of International Class in 2016.

In 2022, the Sichuan Province Women's Federation named her a March 8th Red Flag Bearer.
