= Boxing at the 2023 Pan American Games =

- Boxing pictogram
- Venue: Olympic Training Center
- Start date: October 19, 2023
- End date: October 27, 2023
- No. of events: 13 (7 men, 6 women)
- Competitors: 179 from 27 nations

Boxing competitions at the 2023 Pan American Games in Santiago, Chile were held between October 19 and 27, 2023 at the Olympic Training Center, located in Ñuñoa.

The competition was split among 13 events, seven for men and six for women. The event served as a qualifier for the 2024 Summer Olympics in Paris, France, as the two finalists will secure spots to the Games.

== Qualification system ==
A total of 130 boxers will qualify to compete at the games (ten per event). The host nation (Chile) received automatic qualification spots. The remainder of the spots were awarded through various qualifying tournaments. However, the International Olympic Committee’s Paris Boxing Unit later decided the competition was an open registration event, meaning any NOC could enter a boxer into the event.

== Participating nations ==
A total of 27 NOC's entered boxers.

- Antigua and Barbuda (2)
- Argentina (11)
- Barbados (3)
- Brazil (13)
- Canada (13)
- Chile (9)
- Colombia (13)
- Costa Rica (4)
- Cuba (10)
- Dominica (2)
- Dominican Republic (12)
- Ecuador (10)
- El Salvador (1)
- Grenada (2)
- Guyana (5)
- Haiti (5)
- Independent Athletes Team (5)
- Jamaica (2)
- Mexico (11)
- Panama (5)
- Paraguay (2)
- Peru (2)
- Puerto Rico (7)
- Trinidad and Tobago (5)
- United States (13)
- Uruguay (3)
- Venezuela (11)

== Medal summary ==
=== Medal table ===
* Host nation (Chile)

| Rank | NOC's | Gold | Silver | Bronze | Total |
|---|---|---|---|---|---|
| 1 | Brazil | 4 | 5 | 3 | 12 |
| 2 | United States | 2 | 2 | 2 | 6 |
| 3 | Cuba | 2 | 1 | 1 | 4 |
| 4 | Canada | 2 | 0 | 4 | 6 |
| 5 | Colombia | 1 | 2 | 3 | 6 |
| 6 | Mexico | 1 | 1 | 1 | 3 |
| 7 | Dominican Republic | 1 | 0 | 2 | 3 |
| 8 | Ecuador | 0 | 1 | 2 | 3 |
| 9 | Panama | 0 | 1 | 1 | 2 |
| 10 | Argentina | 0 | 0 | 2 | 2 |
| 10 | Venezuela | 0 | 0 | 2 | 2 |
| 12 | Chile* | 0 | 0 | 1 | 1 |
| 12 | Haiti | 0 | 0 | 1 | 1 |
| 12 | Puerto Rico | 0 | 0 | 1 | 1 |
| Totals (14 entries) | | 13 | 13 | 26 | 52 |

=== Medallists ===
==== Men ====
| Event | Gold | Silver | Bronze |
|---|---|---|---|
| 51 kg | Junior Alcántara; Dominican Republic | Michael Trindade; Brazil | Roscoe Hill; United States |
| 51 kg | Junior Alcántara; Dominican Republic | Michael Trindade; Brazil | Ramón Quiroga; Argentina |
| 57 kg | Jahmal Harvey; United States | Saidel Horta; Cuba | Luiz Gabriel Oliveira; Brazil |
| 57 kg | Jahmal Harvey; United States | Saidel Horta; Cuba | José de los Santos; Dominican Republic |
| 63.5 kg | Wyatt Sanford; Canada | Miguel Martínez; Mexico | Yuri Falcão; Brazil |
| 63.5 kg | Wyatt Sanford; Canada | Miguel Martínez; Mexico | Alexy de la Cruz; Dominican Republic |
| 71 kg | Marco Verde; Mexico | José Rodríguez; Ecuador | Eduardo Beckford; Panama |
| 71 kg | Marco Verde; Mexico | José Rodríguez; Ecuador | Junior Petanqui; Canada |
| 80 kg | Arlen López; Cuba | Wanderley Pereira; Brazil | Abraham Buonarrigo; Argentina |
| 80 kg | Arlen López; Cuba | Wanderley Pereira; Brazil | Cédrick Belony-Dulièpre; Haiti |
| 92 kg | Julio César La Cruz; Cuba | Keno Machado; Brazil | Julio Castillo; Ecuador |
| 92 kg | Julio César La Cruz; Cuba | Keno Machado; Brazil | Bryan Colwell; Canada |
| +92 kg | Joshua Edwards; United States | Abner Teixeira; Brazil | Cristian Salcedo; Colombia |
| +92 kg | Joshua Edwards; United States | Abner Teixeira; Brazil | Fernando Arzola; Cuba |

==== Women ====
| Event | Gold | Silver | Bronze |
|---|---|---|---|
| 50 kg | Caroline de Almeida; Brazil | Jennifer Lozano; United States | Ingrit Valencia; Colombia |
| 50 kg | Caroline de Almeida; Brazil | Jennifer Lozano; United States | Mckenzie Wright; Canada |
| 54 kg | Yeni Arias; Colombia | Tatiana Chagas; Brazil | Johana Gómez; Venezuela |
| 54 kg | Yeni Arias; Colombia | Tatiana Chagas; Brazil | Denisse Bravo; Chile |
| 57 kg | Jucielen Romeu; Brazil | Valeria Arboleda; Colombia | Ashleyann Lozada; Puerto Rico |
| 57 kg | Jucielen Romeu; Brazil | Valeria Arboleda; Colombia | Omailyn Alcalá; Venezuela |
| 60 kg | Beatriz Ferreira; Brazil | Angie Valdés; Colombia | Jajaira Gonzalez; United States |
| 60 kg | Beatriz Ferreira; Brazil | Angie Valdés; Colombia | María José Palacios; Ecuador |
| 66 kg | Bárbara dos Santos; Brazil | Morelle McCane; United States | Charlie Cavanagh; Canada |
| 66 kg | Bárbara dos Santos; Brazil | Morelle McCane; United States | Camila Camilo; Colombia |
| 75 kg | Tammara Thibeault; Canada | Atheyna Bylon; Panama | Citlalli Ortiz; Mexico |
| 75 kg | Tammara Thibeault; Canada | Atheyna Bylon; Panama | Viviane Pereira; Brazil |

== 2024 Summer Olympics Qualification ==
This event was a direct qualification event for the 2024 Summer Olympics. A total of 30 quota places (14 for men and 16 for women) were awarded.

| Event | Qualification path | Quotas | NOCs |
|---|---|---|---|
| Men's 51 kg | Two NOCs of the finalists, will each earn one quota place. | 2 (1 per NOC) | Brazil; Dominican Republic |
| Men's 57 kg | Two NOCs of the finalists, will each earn one quota place. | 2 (1 per NOC) | Cuba; United States |
| Men's 63.5 kg | Two NOCs of the finalists, will each earn one quota place. | 2 (1 per NOC) | Canada; Mexico |
| Men's 71 kg | Two NOCs of the finalists, will each earn one quota place. | 2 (1 per NOC) | Ecuador; Mexico |
| Men's 80 kg | Two NOCs of the finalists, will each earn one quota place. | 2 (1 per NOC) | Brazil; Cuba |
| Men's 92 kg | Two NOCs of the finalists, will each earn one quota place. | 2 (1 per NOC) | Brazil; Cuba |
| Men's +92 kg | Two NOCs of the finalists, will each earn one quota place. | 2 (1 per NOC) | Brazil; United States |
| Women's 50 kg | Two NOCs of the finalists, will each earn one quota place. | 2 (1 per NOC) | Brazil; United States |
| Women's 54 kg | Two NOCs of the finalists, will each earn one quota place. | 2 (1 per NOC) | Brazil; Colombia |
| Women's 57 kg | Four NOCs of the semifinalists, will each earn one quota place. | 4 (1 per NOC) | Brazil; Colombia; Puerto Rico; Venezuela |
| Women's 60 kg | Four NOCs of the semifinalists, will each earn one quota place. | 4 (1 per NOC) | Brazil; Colombia; Ecuador; United States |
| Women's 66 kg | Two NOCs of the finalists, will each earn one quota place. | 2 (1 per NOC) | Brazil; United States |
| Women's 75 kg | Two NOCs of the finalists, will each earn one quota place. | 2 (1 per NOC) | Canada; Panama |
| Total quota places awarded | | 30 | |

== See also ==
- Boxing at the 2024 Summer Olympics
