= Julia Szeremeta =

Polish boxer (born 2003)

Personal information
- Nationality: Poland
- Born: 24 August 2003 (age 22) Chełm, Poland
- Height: 1.65 m (5 ft 5 in)
- Weight: Featherweight

Boxing career
Medal record
Women's amateur boxing
Representing Poland
Olympic Games
Silver medal – second place	2024 Paris	Featherweight
World Championships
Silver medal – second place	2025 Liverpool	57 kg

Julia Atena Szeremeta (born 24 August 2003) is a Polish amateur boxer in the featherweight division.

== Background ==
At the age of five, Szeremeta began training in karate, later deciding on boxing. She initially trained at MKS II LO Chełm, and after graduating from junior high school, she became a competitor for Paco Lublin.

== Amateur career ==
In 2022, Szeremeta became the Polish champion in the 60 kg category, defeating Żaklina Kociołek in the final. A year later, she competed at the 2023 European Games, where she finished in 5th place in the 57 kg category after losing in the quarterfinals to Bulgarian Svetlana Staneva, and also became the European youth champion in the same category after defeating Bojana Gojković from Montenegro in the final.

In March 2024, Szeremeta qualified for the 2024 Summer Olympics, where she competed in the 57 kg category. In the first round she defeated Omailyn Alcala from Venezuela, and in the round of 16 she defeated Australian Tina Rahimi. In the quarterfinal she beat Puerto Rican Ashleyann Lozada and ensured herself of at least a bronze medal. It is the first Olympic medal in boxing for Poland since 1992, when Wojciech Bartnik won a bronze. In the semifinal, she won against Nesthy Petecio from the Philippines and advanced to the final, which she lost to Lin Yu-ting of Chinese Taipei by unanimous decision. It was the first Olympic final in boxing for Poland since Paweł Skrzecz's silver medal in 1980. She was a flagbearer of Poland at the closing ceremony, together with Wiktor Głazunow. After the Olympics, Szeremeta was awarded a Silver Medal of Merit for National Defence and a Knight's Cross of the Order of Polonia Restituta. She also finished seventh in the 2024 Polish Sports Personality of the Year voting.

In 2025, Szeremeta participated in the World Cup in Brazil, where she won a silver medal. In the quarterfinals, she defeated American Alyssa Mendoza 5–0, and in the semifinals, she defeated Kazakhstan's Ulzhan Sersenbek, also 5–0. This advanced her to the final, where she faced Brazilian Jucielen Romeu. She lost the match 3–2 (29–28, 30–27, 28–29, 27–30, 27–30). In September 2025, at the World Championships in Liverpool, in the 57 kg category, she reached the final, losing in the final to Jaismine Lamboria of India 1–4.

=== Results ===
==== 2024 Summer Olympics results ====
- Defeated Omailyn Cegovia (Venezuela) PTS (4-1)
- Defeated Tina Rahimi (Australia) PTS (5-0)
- Defeated Ashleyann Lozada (Puerto Rico) PTS (5-0)
- Defeated Nesthy Petecio (Philippines) PTS (4-1)
- Lost to Lin Yu-ting (Chinese Taipei) MD (0-5) (claim silver medal)

== Political career ==
In 2024, Szeremeta ran in the elections to the Lublin Voivodeship Assembly from the far-right Confederation and Nonpartisan Local Government Activists list, but was not elected.
