= Brazil at the 2024 Summer Olympics =

Brazil at the Games of the XXXIII Olympiad in Paris

- IOC code: BRA
- NOC: Brazilian Olympic Committee
- Website: www.cob.org.br (in Portuguese)

in Paris, France 26 July 2024 – 11 August 2024
- Competitors: 277 (123 men and 154 women) in 29 sports
- Flag bearers (opening): Isaquias Queiroz & Raquel Kochhann
- Flag bearers (closing): Ana Patrícia Ramos & Duda Lisboa
- Officials: Rogério Sampaio, chef de mission
- Medals Ranked 20th: Gold 3 Silver 7 Bronze 10 Total 20

Summer Olympics appearances (overview)
- 1920; 1924; 1928; 1932; 1936; 1948; 1952; 1956; 1960; 1964; 1968; 1972; 1976; 1980; 1984; 1988; 1992; 1996; 2000; 2004; 2008; 2012; 2016; 2020; 2024; 2028

Brazil competed at the 2024 Summer Olympics in Paris from 26 July to 11 August 2024. Brazilian athletes have appeared in every edition of the Summer Olympic Games from 1920 onwards, except for Amsterdam 1928.

Olympic gold medalist in 2020 Summer Olympics canoeist Isaquias Queiroz and rugby sevens player Raquel Kochhann were the country's opening ceremony flagbearers. Meanwhile, Olympic champions beach volleyball players Ana Patrícia Ramos and Duda Lisboa were the country's flagbearers during the closing ceremony.

Brazil was represented by more female than male athletes for the first time in the Summer Olympics (123 men and 154 women). The female athletes also won more medals and all the gold medals.

== Summary ==
The first Brazilian medal in Paris was awarded to judoka Willian Lima at men's 66 kg. Lima won four fights, defeating Mongolian Baskhuu Yondonperenlei, a two-time World Championship bronze medalist, in the quarterfinals, and Kazakh Gusman Kyrgyzbayev, the 2021 World Championship runner-up, in the semifinals, to reach the Olympic final, something that had not happened with Brazilian men's judo since Sydney 2000. In the final, facing Japanese Hifumi Abe, the incumbent gold medalist from Tokyo 2020 and four-time world champion, Lima was defeated and conquered the silver medal.

Larissa Pimenta won bronze medal in women's 52 kg, after being defeated by Amandine Buchard in the quarterfinals, she went on to the repechage, where she beat German Mascha Ballhaus. In the bronze medal fight, Pimenta beat world champion and Olympic runner-up Italian Odette Giuffrida by ippon and took the medal.

The first gold medal conquered by Brazil was in the women's +78 kg event by judoka Beatriz Souza. Souza defeated tough competitors, including South Korean Kim Ha-yun and French Romane Dicko, number 1 in the world ranking and supported by the crowd in the stands. The gold medal came in the dispute against Israeli Raz Hershko, who was won by waza-ari in the final.

The fourth and last medal in judo was a bronze medal awarded in the mixed team event. To reach the podium, Brazil beat Kazakhstan, but lost to Germany in a tiebreaker. In the repechage, the Brazilians beat Serbia and went on to play for third place. The team tied with Italy 3–3 and the decision was made in a tiebreaker. In the draw, the women's 57 kg category was selected, with Rafaela Silva taking to the mat for the second time to face Veronica Toniolo. In 14 seconds, Rafaela scored a waza-ari, scoring Brazil's fourth point and securing the bronze. Among the medalists, Larissa Pimenta, Willian Lima and Beatriz Souza conquered their second medal in Paris, and previous medalists Rafaela Silva, Daniel Cargnin and Ketleyn Quadros also conquered their second olympic medals and Rafael Silva his third Olympic medal.

Two medals were conquered in skateboarding. Rayssa Leal was bronze medalist in women's street. The 16-year-old Brazil's youngest-ever medalist had a score of 253.37, below the Japanese gold and silver medalists Coco Yoshizawa and Liz Akama. With the bronze medal she won in Paris, she became the youngest person in history, among men and women, to reach the podium in two different Olympics. A silver medalist in Tokyo at the age of 13, she returned to the podium in Paris at the age of 16 years, six months and 24 days. In doing so, she broke the record held by American diver Dorothy Poynton-Hill, who won silver in Amsterdam 1928 and gold in Los Angeles 1932, when she was 17 years and 26 days old.

The second medal in skateboarding was achieved in men's park by Augusto Akio. With 91.85 on the last lap of the skate park final, Akio was bronze medalist, below the scores of Australian Keegan Palmer, who won his second Olympic championship with 93.11, and American Tom Schaar, who scored 92.23.

In artistic gymnastics, Brazil had its best performance ever in the sport, with four medals conquered. Brazilian athletes Rebeca Andrade, Flavia Saraiva, Jade Barbosa, Lorrane Oliveira, and Julia Soares made history by winning the bronze medal in the artistic gymnastics team competition at the Paris Olympics. This marks Brazil's first podium finish in the team event at the Olympic Games. To achieve this milestone, the Brazilian team earned 164.497 points, finishing behind the United States, who won gold with 171.296 points thanks to Simone Biles' outstanding performance, and Italy who claimed silver with 165.494 points.

The other three medals in artistic gymnastic were all achieved by Rebeca Andrade. Andrade won the silver medal in women's all-around final, repeating her feat Tokyo 2020, when she also won silver in the discipline. Rebeca Andrade won the silver medal in a historic clash with Simone Biles, who took gold in the women's individual all-around final in artistic gymnastics, with a score of 59.131 points, followed by Andrade with 57.932 and Sunisa Lee with 56.465.

In the final of women's vault, incumbent gold medalist in Tokyo 2020, Rebeca Andrade had an average score of 14.966, winning the silver medal in another duel with Biles, who took gold with a score of 15.300.

In the final event of artistic gymnastics in Paris, Andrade won her fourth Olympic medal and clinched the gold medal in women's floor exercise, with a score of 14.166 narrowly surpassing the favored Simone Biles, who earned 14.133 despite two penalties for stepping off the competition platform, claiming the silver medal. During the floor final medal ceremony, Simone Biles and Jordan Chiles bowed to Andrade as she walked onto the podium, a gesture that went viral. With this victory, Andrade brought her total to six Olympic medals, making her the most decorated Brazilian Olympian, surpassing sailors Robert Scheidt and Torben Grael, who have five Olympic medals.

In the surfing competition, two medals were conquered in Teahupo'o reef pass, Tahiti, French Polynesia. After a fourth place in Tokyo 2020, Gabriel Medina finally won his first Olympic medal. During the competition, Medina had the highest single-wave score of the tournament with a 9.9, and a picture of his subsequent landing appearing to float in mid-air became viral. The semifinal against Australian Jack Robinson had Medina eliminated only surfing one wave, as the Tahitian sea calmed down and did not offer another opportunity for him to score. Medina then beat Peruvian Alonso Correa by 15.54 to 12.43 to get the bronze medal.

In women's shortboard, Tatiana Weston-Webb became the first Brazilian woman to win a medal in surfing. Weston-Webb earned the silver medal at the 2024 Paris Olympics after losing a head-to-head competition with American Caroline Marks at Teahupo'o, with 10.50 to 10.33 in the final.

In the boxing competitions, Beatriz Ferreira was the bronze medalist in women's lightweight, after losing the semifinal to Kellie Harrington from Ireland in a unanimous decision, winning her second Olympic medal, after the silver medal in Tokyo 2020.

In the taekwondo competitions, Edival Pontes, also known as Netinho, lost his first match to Jordanian Zaid Kareem, but was allowed into the repechage once Kareem reached the final. After winning a rematch against Turkish Hakan Reçber, he got to the bronze medal match opposite Spanish Javier Pérez Polo, and with his win, conquered the bronze medal at men's 68 kg category.

Canoeist Isaquias Queiroz, the incumbent Olympic champion in Tokyo 2020, won the silver medal in the men's C–1 1000 m. Queiroz ran a historic sprint in the last quarter of the race, in a thrilling race at the National Olympic Nautical Stadium of Île-de-France in Vaires-sur-Marne; the canoeist managed to rise from fifth place, more than two seconds behind the leader, in the last 250 meters to finish second behind Czech Martin Fuksa. The achievement gives him his fifth Olympic medal, making him second to gymnast Rebeca Andrade with six medals.

Two medals were conquered in athletics. Caio Bonfim snatched the silver medal in men's 20 km walk. From the start of the race, Bonfim remained among the frontrunners, holding the lead for a few kilometers, but on the last lap Ecuadorian Brian Pintado overtook him and won with a time of 1:18:55. Even with two punishments, Bonfim remained among the frontrunners and crossed the finish line in 1:19:09, becoming the first Brazilian ever to win a medal in a race-walk event in athletics.

Alison dos Santos got the bronze medal in men's 400 metres hurdles, with a time of 47.26, behind Karsten Warholm of Norway, with 47.06 and gold medalist Rai Benjamin of the United States with 46.46. He earned his second bronze medal in the event after Tokyo 2020.

In the football competitions, Brazil women's national football team had an unexpected silver medal. Brazil arrived in Paris with discredit, after an early elimination in round group in 2023 FIFA Women's World Cup. In the group stage Brazil had a poor performance, winning the first match against Nigeria and losing to Japan and Spain; if Brazilian national team had conceded one more goal, they would have been eliminated from the Olympics in this stage. In knockout stage opener against France, with a packed stadium, the home team started aggressively and soon earned a penalty, saved by goalkeeper Lorena and Gabi Portilho got the decisive goal in the 82nd minute, ensuring Brazil's 1–0 victory, after an unprecedent time of 19 minutes of stoppage time played. In the semifinal, Brazil created many more chances than their opponents and won 4–2 against incumbent FIFA World Champions Spain. In the final against United States, Brazil lost to 1–0, with a goal from Mallory Swanson in the 57th minute of the gold medal match. The match against the United States marked the farewell of Marta, the legendary player of the Brazilian national team, who entered in the second half of the match. Marta won her third silver Olympic medal.

In the women's tournament of beach volleyball, Brazil won its third gold medal with Ana Patrícia Ramos and Duda Lisboa. The Brazilians had an impeccable campaign, with six victories in six matches to reach the gold medal match, losing only 2 sets during the tournament. In the iconic beach volleyball stadium, in front of Eiffel Tower, Ana Patrícia and Duda confronted Canadians Melissa Humana-Paredes and Brandie Wilkerson in the gold medal match. Ana Patrícia and Duda rallied from an 11–5 deficit to take the first-to-21, win-by-two first set 26–24, and Canada won the second 21–12. In a tense tie-breaker Brazilians won 15–10, earning the gold medal. Brazilian women won the second gold medal in the history of the tournament, 28 years later of the historic inaugural title of Jackie Silva and Sandra Pires in Atlanta 1996. Ana Patrícia and Duda also served as flag bearers for Brazil at the Games' closing ceremony.

The last Brazilian medal of 2024 Summer Olympics was a bronze one achieved by Brazil women's national volleyball team. The team went undefeated in the pool round and in the bracket leading up to the semifinal, but lost by 3 sets to 2 to the United States. In the bronze medal match, Brazil defeated Turkey by 3–1 The 25–21 27–25 22–25 25–15 victory gave Brazil, runners-up at the Tokyo Games, their third bronze in Olympic women's volleyball, taking them to joint highest in the all-time medals table with six. Among the Brazilian players, Thaísa Menezes, a twice-Olympic champion who came out of retirement in 2023, got her third Olympic medal. The coach José Roberto Guimarães won his fifth Olympic medal, being three of them gold medals.

== Medalists ==
Medal	Name	Sport	Event	Date
Gold	Beatriz Souza	Judo	Women's +78 kg	2 August
Gold	Rebeca Andrade	Gymnastics	Women's floor exercise	5 August
Gold	Ana Patrícia Ramos; Duda Lisboa	Volleyball	Women's beach volleyball	9 August
Silver	Willian Lima	Judo	Men's 66 kg	28 July
Silver	Caio Bonfim	Athletics	Men's 20 km walk	1 August
Silver	Rebeca Andrade	Gymnastics	Women's artistic individual all-around	1 August
Silver	Rebeca Andrade	Gymnastics	Women's vault	3 August
Silver	Tatiana Weston-Webb	Surfing	Women's shortboard	6 August
Silver	Isaquias Queiroz	Canoeing	Men's C–1 1000 m	9 August
Silver	Brazil women's national football team: Lorena Silva; Antônia Silva; Tarciane Lima; Rafaelle Souza; Duda Sampaio; Tamires Dias; Kerolin Ferraz; Vitória Yaya; Adriana Silva; Marta Silva; Jheniffer Cordinali; Tainá Borges; Yasmim Ribeiro; Ludmila Silva; Thaís Ferreira; Gabi Nunes; Ana Vitória; Gabi Portilho; Priscila Silva; Angelina Constantino; Lauren Leal; Luciana Dionizio	Football	Women's tournament	10 August
Bronze	Larissa Pimenta	Judo	Women's 52 kg	28 July
Bronze	Rayssa Leal	Skateboarding	Women's street	28 July
Bronze	Rebeca Andrade; Jade Barbosa; Lorrane Oliveira; Flávia Saraiva; Júlia Soares	Gymnastics	Women's artistic team all-around	30 July
Bronze	Daniel Cargnin; Leonardo Gonçalves; Willian Lima; Rafael Macedo; Guilherme Schimidt; Rafael Silva; Larissa Pimenta; Ketleyn Quadros; Rafaela Silva; Beatriz Souza	Judo	Mixed team	3 August
Bronze	Beatriz Ferreira	Boxing	Women's 60 kg	3 August
Bronze	Gabriel Medina	Surfing	Men's shortboard	6 August
Bronze	Augusto Akio	Skateboarding	Men's park	7 August
Bronze	Edival Pontes	Taekwondo	Men's 68 kg	8 August
Bronze	Alison dos Santos	Athletics	Men's 400 m hurdles	9 August
Bronze	Brazil women's national volleyball team: Nyeme Costa; Diana Duarte; Macris Carneiro; Thaísa Daher; Rosamaria Montibeller; Roberta Ratzke; Gabriela Guimarães; Ana Cristina de Souza; Natália Araújo; Ana Carolina da Silva; Júlia Bergmann; Tainara Santos; Lorenne Teixeira	Volleyball	Women's tournament	10 August

Medals by sport
Sport	1st place, gold medalist(s)	2nd place, silver medalist(s)	3rd place, bronze medalist(s)	Total
Gymnastics	1	2	1	4
Judo	1	1	2	4
Volleyball	1	0	1	2
Athletics	0	1	1	2
Surfing	0	1	1	2
Canoeing	0	1	0	1
Football	0	1	0	1
Skateboarding	0	0	2	2
Boxing	0	0	1	1
Taekwondo	0	0	1	1
Total	3	7	10	20

Medals by gender
Gender	1st place, gold medalist(s)	2nd place, silver medalist(s)	3rd place, bronze medalist(s)	Total
Female	3	4	5	12
Male	0	3	4	7
Mixed	0	0	1	1
Total	3	7	10	20

Medals by day
Day	1st place, gold medalist(s)	2nd place, silver medalist(s)	3rd place, bronze medalist(s)	Total
27 July	0	0	0	0
28 July	0	1	2	3
29 July	0	0	0	0
30 July	0	0	1	1
31 July	0	0	0	0
1 August	0	2	0	2
2 August	1	0	0	1
3 August	0	1	2	3
4 August	0	0	0	0
5 August	1	0	0	1
6 August	0	1	1	2
7 August	0	0	1	1
8 August	0	0	1	1
9 August	1	1	1	3
10 August	0	1	1	2
11 August	0	0	0	0
Total	3	7	10	20

=== Multiple medallists ===
The following competitors won multiple medals at the 2024 Olympic Games.

Name	Medal	Sport	Event
Rebeca Andrade	Gold; Silver; Silver; Bronze	Gymnastics	Women's floor exercise Women's artistic individual all-around Women's vault Women's artistic team all-around
Beatriz Souza	Gold; Bronze	Judo	Women's +78 kg Mixed team
Willian Lima	Silver; Bronze	Judo	Men's 66 kg Mixed team
Larissa Pimenta	Bronze; Bronze	Judo	Women's 52 kg Mixed team

== Competitors ==
The following is the list of number of competitors in the Games. Note that reserves in some sports are not counted:

Sport	Men	Women	Total
Archery	1	1	2
Athletics	24	20	44
Badminton	1	1	2
Basketball	12	0	12
Boxing	5	5	10
Canoeing	5	3	8
Cycling	3	3	6
Diving	0	1	1
Equestrian	7	0	7
Fencing	1	2	3
Football	0	18	18
Gymnastics	3	12	15
Handball	0	14	14
Judo	7	6	13
Modern pentathlon	0	1	1
Rowing	1	1	2
Rugby sevens	0	12	12
Sailing	7	5	12
Shooting	1	2	3
Skateboarding	6	6	12
Surfing	3	3	6
Swimming	11	9	20
Table tennis	3	3	6
Taekwondo	2	2	4
Tennis	2	3	5
Triathlon	2	2	4
Volleyball	16	16	32
Weightlifting	0	2	2
Wrestling	0	1	1
Total	123	154	277

== Archery ==
Brazilian archers secured two quota places for the 2024 Summer Olympics men's and women's individual recurve competitions by virtue of their results at the 2023 World Championships in Berlin, Germany and the recurve archery competition at the 2023 Pan American Games in Santiago, Chile. The full roster was announced on 1 July 2024.

Athlete	Event	Ranking round		Round of 64	Round of 32	Round of 16	Quarterfinals	Semifinals	Final / BM	
Athlete	Event	Score	Seed	Opposition Score	Opposition Score	Opposition Score	Opposition Score	Opposition Score	Opposition Score	Rank
Marcus Vinicius D'Almeida	Men's individual	673	17	Usach (UKR); W 6–2	Saito (JPN); W 7–1	Kim W-j (KOR); L 1–7	Did not advance			
Ana Luiza Caetano	Women's individual	660	19	Pintarič (SLO); W 6–2	Mashayikh (MAS); W 6–5	Barbelin (FRA); L 2–6	Did not advance			
Marcus Vinicius D'Almeida; Ana Luiza Caetano	Mixed team	1333	10 Q	—N/a		Mexico; L 1–5	Did not advance			

== Athletics ==
Brazilian track and field athletes achieved the entry standards for Paris 2024, either by passing the direct qualifying mark (or time for track and road races) or by world ranking and through the Race Walking Team World Championships in the following events (a maximum of three athletes each).

The Brazilian Athletics Confederation announced the full squads on 8 July 2024.

Key

- Note–Ranks given for track events are within the athlete's heat only
- Q = Qualified for the next round
- q = Qualified for the next round as a fastest loser or, in field events, by position without achieving the qualifying target
- NR = National record
- N/A = Round not applicable for the event
- Bye = Athlete not required to compete in round

Track and road events

Men

Athlete	Event	Preliminary		Heat		Repechage		Semifinal		Final	
Athlete	Event	Time	Rank	Time	Rank	Time	Rank	Time	Rank	Time	Rank
Erik Cardoso	100 m	Bye		10.35	6	—N/a		Did not advance			
Felipe Bardi	100 m	Bye		10.18	4	—N/a		Did not advance			
Paulo André Camilo	100 m	Bye		10.46	8	—N/a		Did not advance			
Renan Gallina	200 m	—N/a		20.41	3 Q	Bye		20.60	6	Did not advance	
Lucas Carvalho	400 m	—N/a		45.85	7	46.24	3	Did not advance			
Eduardo de Deus	110 m hurdles	—N/a		13.37	3 Q	Bye		13.43	6	Did not advance	
Rafael Pereira	110 m hurdles	—N/a		13.47	6	13.54	1 Q	13.87	8	Did not advance	
Alison dos Santos	400 m hurdles	—N/a		48.75	3 Q	Bye		47.95	3 q	47.26	3rd place, bronze medalist(s)
Matheus Lima	400 m hurdles	—N/a		48.90	2 Q	Bye		49.08	4	Did not advance	
Erik Cardoso; Felipe Bardi; Renan Gallina; Gabriel Garcia; Paulo André Camilo^{[c]} Hygor Gabriel^{[c]}	4 × 100 m relay	—N/a		38.73	6	—N/a				Did not advance	
Lucas Vilar; Douglas Hernandes; Jadson Lima; Matheus Lima; Alison dos Santos^{[c]}	4 × 400 m relay	—N/a		3:00.95	5	—N/a				Did not advance	
Max Batista	20 km walk	—N/a								1:22:16	28
Caio Bonfim	20 km walk	—N/a								1:19:09	2nd place, silver medalist(s)
Matheus Corrêa	20 km walk	—N/a								1:24:25	39

Women

Athlete	Event	Preliminary		Heat		Repechage		Semifinal		Final	
Athlete	Event	Time	Rank	Time	Rank	Time	Rank	Time	Rank	Time	Rank
Ana Carolina Azevedo	100 m	Bye		11.32	4	—N/a		Did not advance			
Vitória Cristina Rosa	100 m	Bye		12.02	8	—N/a		Did not advance			
Ana Carolina Azevedo	200 m	—N/a		23.37	8	23.44	6	Did not advance			
Lorraine Martins	200 m	—N/a		23.68	8	23.82	6	Did not advance			
Tiffani Marinho	400 m	—N/a		52.62	5	52.32	6	Did not advance			
Flávia de Lima	800 m	—N/a		2:00.73	6	2:01.64	5	Did not advance			
Chayenne da Silva	400 m hurdles	—N/a		56.52	7	56.56	7	Did not advance			
Tatiane Raquel da Silva	3000 m steeplechase	—N/a		9:33.96	10	—N/a				Did not advance	
Érica de Sena	20 km walk	—N/a								1:29:32	13
Viviane Lyra	20 km walk	—N/a								1:30:31	18
Gabriela de Sousa	20 km walk	—N/a								1:35:50	36

Mixed

Athlete	Event	Final	
Athlete	Event	Result	Rank
Caio Bonfim; Viviane Lyra	Marathon race walking relay	2:54:08	7

^{c} Athletes were reserves for the relay.

Field events

Men

Athlete	Event	Qualification		Final	
Athlete	Event	Distance	Position	Distance	Position
Fernando Ferreira	High jump	2.20	7	Did not advance	
Lucas Marcelino	Long jump	NM	—N/a	Did not advance	
Almir dos Santos	Triple jump	17.06	5 q	16.41	11
Welington Morais	Shot put	NM	—N/a	Did not advance	
Luiz Maurício da Silva	Javelin throw	85.91 AR	6 Q	80.67	11
Pedro Henrique Rodrigues	Javelin throw	79.46	19	Did not advance	

Women

Athlete	Event	Qualification		Final	
Athlete	Event	Distance	Position	Distance	Position
Valdiléia Martins	High jump	1.92 NR	11 Q	NM	
Juliana Campos	Pole vault	4.40	21	Did not advance	
Lissandra Campos	Long jump	6.02	31	Did not advance	
Eliane Martins	Long jump	6.36	23	Did not advance	
Gabriele dos Santos	Triple jump	13.63	23	Did not advance	
Lívia Avancini	Shot put	16.26	29	Did not advance	
Ana Caroline Silva	Shot put	17.09	23	Did not advance	
Izabela da Silva	Discus throw	61.68	17	Did not advance	
Andressa de Morais	Discus throw	59.43	26	Did not advance	
Jucilene de Lima	Javelin throw	57.56	28	Did not advance	

Combined events – Men's decathlon

Athlete	Event	100 m	LJ	SP	HJ	400 m	110H	DT	PV	JT	1500 m	Final	Rank
José Fernando Ferreira	Result	10.66	7.24	13.97	1.93	48.78	14.00	42.86	4.80	70.58	4:49.73	8213	14
José Fernando Ferreira	Points	938	871	727	740	872	975	723	849	898	620	8213	14

== Badminton ==
Brazil entered two badminton players into the Olympic tournament based on the BWF Race to Paris Rankings.

Athlete	Event	Group stage			Elimination	Quarterfinal	Semifinal	Final / BM	
Athlete	Event	Opposition Score	Opposition Score	Rank	Opposition Score	Opposition Score	Opposition Score	Opposition Score	Rank
Ygor Coelho	Men's singles	Naraoka (JPN); L (16–21, 19–21)	Jeon (KOR); L (12–21, 19–21)	3	Did not advance				
Juliana Vieira	Women's singles	Katethong (THA); L (16–21, 19–21)	Lo (HKG); W (21–19, 21–14)	2	Did not advance				

== Basketball ==
=== 5×5 basketball ===
Summary

Team	Event	Group stage				Quarterfinal	Semifinal	Final / BM	
Team	Event	Opposition Score	Opposition Score	Opposition Score	Rank	Opposition Score	Opposition Score	Opposition Score	Rank
Brazil men's	Men's tournament	France; L 66–78	Germany; L 73–86	Japan; W 102–84	3 Q	United States; L 87–122	Did not advance		

==== Men's tournament ====
For the first time since 2016 as a host nation, Brazil men's basketball team qualified by winning the 2024 FIBA Men's Olympic Qualifying Tournament in Riga, Latvia.

Team roster

A 14-player roster was announced on 11 July 2024. Alexey Borges and Elinho Corazza were released and the final roster was announced on 23 July 2024.

Brazil men's national basketball team – 2024 Summer Olympics roster
Players
Coaches

Pos.	No.	Name	Age – Date of birth	Height	Club	Ctr.
PG	2	Yago dos Santos	25 – 9 March 1999	1.78 m (5 ft 10 in)	Crvena zvezda	(Serbia)
C	6	Cristiano Felicio	32 – 7 July 1992	2.06 m (6 ft 9 in)	Granada	(Spain)
SG	7	Didi Louzada	25 – 2 July 1999	1.96 m (6 ft 5 in)	Flamengo	(Brazil)
SG	8	Vitor Benite	34 – 20 February 1990	1.94 m (6 ft 4 in)	Palencia	(Spain)
PG	9	Marcelinho Huertas (C)	41 – 25 May 1983	1.91 m (6 ft 3 in)	Tenerife	(Spain)
SG	11	Gui Santos	22 – 22 June 2002	1.97 m (6 ft 6 in)	Golden State Warriors	(United States)
SF	14	Léo Meindl	31 – 20 March 1993	2.01 m (6 ft 7 in)	Alvark Tokyo	(Japan)
PG	23	Raul Neto	32 – 19 May 1992	1.85 m (6 ft 1 in)	Free agent
G	32	Georginho de Paula	28 – 24 May 1996	1.97 m (6 ft 6 in)	Franca	(Brazil)
F	45	Mãozinha Pereira	23 – 28 August 2000	1.98 m (6 ft 6 in)	Memphis Grizzlies	(United States)
PF	51	Bruno Caboclo	28 – 21 September 1995	2.06 m (6 ft 9 in)	Partizan	(Serbia)
PF	99	Lucas Dias	29 – 6 July 1995	2.07 m (6 ft 9 in)	Franca	(Brazil)

Head coach

- (Croatia) Aleksandar Petrovic

Assistant coach(es)

- (Brazil) Hélio Rubens Filho
- (Brazil) Bruno Savignani
- (Brazil) Tiago Splitter

Legend

- (C) Team captain
- Club – describes last
  club before the competition
- Age – describes age
  on 27 July 2024

Group play

Pos	Team	Pld	W	L	PF	PA	PD	Pts	Qualification
1	Germany	3	3	0	268	221	+47	6	Quarterfinals
2	France (H)	3	2	1	243	241	+2	5	Quarterfinals
3	Brazil	3	1	2	241	248	−7	4	Quarterfinals
4	Japan	3	0	3	251	293	−42	3	

Source: FIBA
Rules for classification: 1) classification points; 2) head-to-head results; 3) head-to-head game points difference; 4) head-to-head number of game points scored.
(H) Hosts

27 July 2024
17:15

Boxscore

France	78–66	Brazil
Scoring by quarter: 15–23, 24–13, 18–9, 21–21
Pts: Batum, Wembanyama 19; Rebs: Wembanyama 9 Asts: Albicy 4		Pts: Felício, Meindl 14; Rebs: Felício 6 Asts: Dos Santos 6

Stade Pierre-Mauroy, Lille
Attendance: 26,766
Referees: Matthew Kallio (CAN), Luis Castillo (ESP), Carlos Peralta (ECU)

30 July 2024
21:00

Boxscore

Brazil	73–86	Germany
Scoring by quarter: 10–22, 30–18, 11–20, 22–26
Pts: Dos Santos 18; Rebs: Meindl 6 Asts: Dos Santos 8		Pts: Schröder 20; Rebs: Voigtmann 8 Asts: Schröder 6

Stade Pierre-Mauroy, Lille
Attendance: 23,884
Referees: Antonio Conde (ESP), Omar Bermúdez (MEX), Gatis Saliņš (LAT)

2 August 2024
11:00

Boxscore

Japan	84–102	Brazil
Scoring by quarter: 20–31, 24–24, 29–22, 11–25
Pts: Hawkinson 26; Rebs: Hawkinson 10; Asts: Kawamura 10		Pts: Caboclo 33; Rebs: Caboclo 17; Asts: Huertas 8

Stade Pierre-Mauroy, Lille
Attendance: 26,850
Referees: Matthew Kallio (CAN), Boris Krejić (SLO), Wojciech Liszka (POL)

Quarterfinals

6 August 2024
21:30

Boxscore

Brazil	87–122	United States
Scoring by quarter: 21–33, 15–30, 35–31, 16–28
Pts: Caboclo 30; Rebs: Georginho 8 Asts: Meindl 7		Pts: Booker 18; Rebs: Davis 8 Asts: James 9

Accor Arena, Paris
Attendance: 12,364
Referees: Antonio Conde (ESP), Luis Castillo (ESP), Yevgeniy Mikheyev (KAZ)

== Boxing ==
Brazil entered nine boxers (five women and four men) into the Olympic tournament. Beatriz Ferreira (women's lightweight), Jucielen Romeu (women's featherweight), Tatiana Chagas (women's bantamweight), Caroline Almeida (women's flyweight), Bárbara Santos (women's welterweight), Keno Machado (men's heavyweight), Michael Trindade (men's flyweight), Wanderley Pereira (men's middleweight) and Abner Teixeira (men's superheavyweight) secured their selection to the Brazilian squad in their respective weight divisions, either by advancing to the semifinals, or finishing in the top two, at the 2023 Pan American Games in Santiago, Chile. Luiz Gabriel Oliveira (men's featherweight), achieved one more quota for the nations, by winning the quota bouts round at the 2024 World Olympic Qualification Tournament 1 in Busto Arsizio, Italy.

Men

Athlete	Event	Round of 32	Round of 16	Quarterfinals	Semifinals	Final	
Athlete	Event	Opposition Result	Opposition Result	Opposition Result	Opposition Result	Opposition Result	Rank
Michael Trindade	Men's 51 kg	Bye	Claro (CUB); L 0–5	Did not advance			
Luiz Gabriel Oliveira	Men's 57 kg	Bye	Harvey (USA); L 2–3	Did not advance			
Wanderley Pereira	Men's 80 kg	Bye	Belony-Dulièpre (HAI); W 5–0	Khyzhniak (UKR); L 0–5	Did not advance		
Keno Machado	Men's 92 kg	—N/a	Brown (GBR); W 4–1	Mullojonov (UZB); L 0–5	Did not advance		
Abner Teixeira	Men's +92 kg	—N/a	Congo (ECU); L 2–3	Did not advance			

Women

Athlete	Event	Round of 32	Round of 16	Quarterfinals	Semifinals	Final	
Athlete	Event	Opposition Result	Opposition Result	Opposition Result	Opposition Result	Opposition Result	Rank
Caroline de Almeida	Women's 50 kg	Bye	Kyzaibay (KAZ); L 0–5	Did not advance			
Tatiana Chagas	Women's 54 kg	Bye	Im (KOR); L 1–4	Did not advance			
Jucielen Romeu	Women's 57 kg	Bye	Mendoza (USA); W 4–1	Yıldız (TUR); L 1–4	Did not advance		
Beatriz Ferreira	Women's 60 kg	Bye	Gonzalez (USA); W 5–0	Heijnen (NED); W 5–0	Harrington (IRL); L 1–4	Did not advance	3rd place, bronze medalist(s)
Bárbara Santos	Women's 66 kg	Bye	Chen (TPE); L 0–5	Did not advance			

== Canoeing ==
=== Slalom ===
Brazil entered three boats into the slalom competition for the 2024 Olympic Games. Two female quotas through the 2023 ICF Canoe Slalom World Championships in London, Great Britain, and one male quota through the 2024 Canoe Slalom Pan American Olympic Qualifiers, in Rio de Janeiro, Brazil.

Athlete	Event	Preliminary						Semifinal		Final	
Athlete	Event	Run 1	Rank	Run 2	Rank	Best	Rank	Time	Rank	Time	Rank
Pepe Gonçalves	Men's C-1	111.07	18	154.48	19	111.07	18	Did not advance			
Pepe Gonçalves	Men's K-1	86.64	6	90.71	13	86.64	8 Q	147.09	20	Did not advance	
Ana Sátila	Women's C-1	109.95	13	105.16	3	105.16	8 Q	109.88	5 Q	112.70	5
Ana Sátila	Women's K-1	98.83	12	96.88	12	96.88	14 Q	102.23	5 Q	100.69	4

Kayak cross

Athlete	Event	Time trial	Rank	Round 1	Repechage	Heats	Quarter-finals	Semi-finals	Final	
Athlete	Event	Time trial	Rank	Position	Position	Position	Position	Position	Position	Rank
Pepe Gonçalves	Men's	66.41	2	2 Q	Bye	4	Did not advance			27
Ana Sátila	Women's	72.64	5	3	1 Q	2 Q	2 Q	3 SM	4	8

Qualification Legend: F=Final (medal); SM=Small Final (non-medal)

=== Sprint ===
Brazilian canoeists qualified five boats in the following distances for the Games through the 2023 ICF Canoe Sprint World Championships in Duisburg, Germany; and 2024 Pan American Canoe Sprint Olympic Qualifiers in Sarasota, United States. The full roster was announced on 4 July 2024.

Athlete	Event	Heats		Quarterfinals		Semifinals		Final	
Athlete	Event	Time	Rank	Time	Rank	Time	Rank	Time	Rank
Isaquias Queiroz	Men's C-1 1000 m	3:53.94	2 SF	Bye		3:44.80	2 FA	3:44.33	2nd place, silver medalist(s)
Mateus Nunes	Men's C-1 1000 m	3:52.60	3 QF	4:08.50	5	Did not advance			
Isaquias Queiroz; Jacky Godmann	Men's C-2 500 m	1:39.38	3 QF	1:38.78	1 SF	1:39.95	3 FA	1:42.58	8
Vagner Souta	Men's K-1 1000 m	3:46.17	4 QF	3:50.72	6	Did not advance			
Valdenice Conceição	Women's C-1 200 m	48.57	2 SF	Bye		46.46	5 FB	46.82	13
Ana Paula Vergutz	Women's K-1 500 m	1:54.98	5 QF	1:56.09	5 SF	1:54.19	8	Did not advance	

Qualification Legend: FA = Qualify to final (medal); FB = Qualify to final B (non-medal); QF = Qualified to Quarter-Final

== Cycling ==
=== Road ===
Brazil entered one male and one female cyclist to compete in the road race events at the Olympic, after secured those quota through the UCI Nation Ranking and 2023 Pan Am Championships in Panama City, Panama.

Athlete	Event	Time	Rank
Vinícius Rangel	Men's road race	6:39:31	71
Ana Vitória Magalhães	Women's road race	4:10:47	74

=== Mountain biking ===
Brazilian mountain bikers secured a men's and a women's quota places through the UCI Cycling Olympic Ranking.

Athlete	Event	Time	Rank
Ulan Bastos Galinski	Men's cross-country	1:30:55	21
Raiza Goulão	Women's cross-country	–2 LAP	28

=== BMX ===
==== Freestyle ====
Brazilian freestyle riders secured a single quota place in the men's BMX freestyle for Paris 2024, with the athlete finishing among the top six at the 2024 Olympic Qualifier Series in Shanghai, China and Budapest, Hungary.

Athlete	Event	Qualification				Final			
Athlete	Event	Run 1	Run 2	Average	Rank	Run 1	Run 2	Best	Rank
Gustavo Oliveira	Men's	85.51	86.07	85.79	8 Q	90.20	88.20	90.20	6

==== Race ====
Brazilian riders secured a single quota place in the women's BMX race for Paris 2024 by topping the field of nations vying for qualification at the 2023 Pan American Championships in Riobamba, Ecuador.

Athlete	Event	Quarterfinal		Last chance qualifier		Semifinal		Final	
Athlete	Event	Points	Rank	Time	Rank	Points	Rank	Result	Rank
Paola Reis	Women's	16	15 Q	2:14.343	7	Did not advance			

== Diving ==
Brazilian divers secured two quota places for Paris 2024 by advancing to the top twelve final of the men's individual and women's individual platform at the 2023 World Aquatics Championships in Fukuoka, Japan. Isaac Souza was forced to withdraw before the start of the Games due to an injury, leaving the country to have only one competitor.

Athlete	Event	Preliminary		Semifinal		Final	
Athlete	Event	Points	Rank	Points	Rank	Points	Rank
Ingrid Oliveira	Women's 10 m platform	255.90	23	Did not advance			

== Equestrian ==
Brazil entered a full squad for jumping riders to the Paris 2024 jumping competition through the 2023 Jumping Nations Cup Final in Barcelona, Spain. And also entered full squads of eventing riders and one equestrian for individual dressage events to the Paris 2024 by winning silver medal in team eventing event, at the 2023 Pan American Games in Santiago, Chile and through the establishment of olympics dressage final ranking. The full squads was announced on 29 June 2024.

=== Dressage ===
Athlete	Horse	Event	Grand Prix		Grand Prix Freestyle		Overall			
Athlete	Horse	Event	Score	Rank	Score	Rank	Technical	Artistic	Score	Rank
João Victor Oliva	Feel Good VO	Individual	70.093	33	Did not advance					

=== Eventing ===
Athlete	Horse	Event	Dressage		Cross-country			Jumping						Total	
Athlete	Horse	Event	Dressage		Cross-country			Qualifier			Final			Total	
Athlete	Horse	Event	Penalties	Rank	Penalties	Total	Rank	Penalties	Total	Rank	Penalties	Total	Rank	Penalties	Rank
Márcio Jorge	Castle Howard Casanova	Individual	33.30	=33	42.40	75.70	52	4.00	79.70	44	Did not advance			79.70	44
Rafael Losano	Withington	Individual	32.40	=30	9.20	41.60	=30	8.80	50.40	29	Did not advance			50.40	29
Carlos Parro	Safira	Individual	37.70	=51	22.40	60.10	42	Withdrawn							
Márcio Jorge; Rafael Losano; Carlos Parro; Ruy Fonseca (reserve)	Castle Howard Casanova; Withington; Safira; Ballypatrick SRS	Team	103.40	12	74.00	177.40	12	17.20	214.60	12	—N/a			214.60	12

=== Jumping ===
Athlete	Horse	Event	Qualification			Final			Jump-off		
Athlete	Horse	Event	Penalties	Time	Rank	Penalties	Time	Rank	Penalties	Time	Rank
Stephan Barcha	Chevaux Primavera Montana Império Egípcio	Individual	0.00	76.03	13 Q	4.00	80.07	5	Did not advance		
Yuri Mansur	Miss Blue	Individual	19.00	93.37	62	Did not advance					
Rodrigo Pessoa	Major Tom	Individual	0.00	77.03	17 Q	RT		—N/a	Did not advance		
Stephan Barcha; Rodrigo Pessoa; Pedro Veniss	Chevaux Primavera Montana Império Egípcio; Major Tom; Nimrod de Muze	Team	EL			Did not advance					

== Fencing ==
Brazil entered one male and two female fencers into the 2024 Olympic competition. The 2019 world champion Nathalie Moellhausen (women's épée) and Guilherme Toldo (men's foil) claimed their spots through the FIE Olympic rankings. Mariana Pistoia (women's foil) secured her olympic spot through the Zonal Panamerican Olympic Qualifying Tournament, held in San José, Costa Rica.

Athlete	Event	Round of 64	Round of 32	Round of 16	Quarterfinal	Semifinal	Final / BM
Athlete	Event	Opposition Score	Opposition Score	Opposition Score	Opposition Score	Opposition Score	Opposition Score
Guilherme Toldo	Men's foil	Bye	Mo (CHN); L 7–15	Did not advance			
Nathalie Moellhausen	Women's épée	Bye	Xiao (CAN); L 11–15	Did not advance			
Mariana Pistoia	Women's foil	Catantan (PHI); L 13–15	Did not advance				

== Football ==
Summary

Key:

- A.E.T – After extra time.
- P – Match decided by penalty-shootout.

Team	Event	Group Stage				Quarterfinal	Semifinal	Final / BM	
Team	Event	Opposition Score	Opposition Score	Opposition Score	Rank	Opposition Score	Opposition Score	Opposition Score	Rank
Brazil women's	Women's tournament	Nigeria; W 1–0	Japan; L 1–2	Spain; L 0–2	3 Q	France; W 1–0	Spain; W 4–2	United States; L 0–1	2nd place, silver medalist(s)

=== Women's tournament ===
Brazil women's football team qualified for the Olympics by advancing to the final match of the 2022 Copa América Femenina in Bucaramanga, Colombia.

Team roster

Brazil named a squad of 18 players and 4 alternates for the tournament on 2 July 2024.

Head coach: Arthur Elias

No.	Pos.	Player	Date of birth (age)	Caps	Goals	Club
1	GK	Lorena	6 May 1997 (aged 27)	22	0	(Brazilian Football Confederation) Grêmio
2	DF	Antônia	26 April 1994 (aged 30)	40	1	(Royal Spanish Football Federation) Levante
3	DF	Tarciane	27 May 2003 (aged 21)	7	1	(United States Soccer Federation) Houston Dash
4	DF	Rafaelle Souza	18 June 1991 (aged 33)	94	9	(United States Soccer Federation) Orlando Pride
5	MF	Duda Sampaio	18 May 2001 (aged 23)	19	2	(Brazilian Football Confederation) Corinthians
6	DF	Tamires	10 October 1987 (aged 36)	148	7	(Brazilian Football Confederation) Corinthians
7	FW	Kerolin	17 November 1999 (aged 24)	37	5	(United States Soccer Federation) North Carolina Courage
8	MF	Vitória Yaya	23 January 2000 (aged 24)	7	1	(Brazilian Football Confederation) Corinthians
9	FW	Adriana	17 November 1996 (aged 27)	56	13	(United States Soccer Federation) Orlando Pride
10	FW	Marta	19 February 1986 (aged 38)	186	119	(United States Soccer Federation) Orlando Pride
11	FW	Jheniffer	6 November 2001 (aged 22)	1	0	(Brazilian Football Confederation) Corinthians
12	GK	Tainá	1 May 1995 (aged 29)	1	0	(Brazilian Football Confederation) América Mineiro
13	DF	Yasmim	28 October 1996 (aged 27)	13	3	(Brazilian Football Confederation) Corinthians
14	FW	Ludmila	1 December 1994 (aged 29)	47	6	(Royal Spanish Football Federation) Atlético Madrid
15	DF	Thaís	1 May 1996 (aged 28)	10	0	(Royal Spanish Football Federation) Tenerife
16	FW	Gabi Nunes	10 March 1997 (aged 27)	32	7	(Royal Spanish Football Federation) Levante
17	MF	Ana Vitória	6 March 2000 (aged 24)	17	2	(Royal Spanish Football Federation) Atlético Madrid
18	FW	Gabi Portilho	18 July 1995 (aged 29)	20	1	(Brazilian Football Confederation) Corinthians
19	FW	Priscila	22 August 2004 (aged 19)	5	1	(Brazilian Football Confederation) Internacional
20	MF	Angelina	26 January 2000 (aged 24)	27	1	(United States Soccer Federation) Orlando Pride
21	DF	Lauren	13 September 2002 (aged 21)	21	0	(United States Soccer Federation) Kansas City Current
22	GK	Luciana	24 July 1987 (aged 37)	44	0	(Brazilian Football Confederation) Ferroviária

Group play

Pos	Team	Pld	W	D	L	GF	GA	GD	Pts	Qualification
1	Spain	3	3	0	0	5	1	+4	9	Advance to knockout stage
2	Japan	3	2	0	1	6	4	+2	6	Advance to knockout stage
3	Brazil	3	1	0	2	2	4	−2	3	Advance to knockout stage
4	Nigeria	3	0	0	3	1	5	−4	0	

Source: FIFA
25 July 2024
19:00

Nigeria	0–1	Brazil
	Report	Gabi Nunes 37'

Stade de Bordeaux, Bordeaux
Attendance: 6,244
Referee: Kim Yu-jeong (South Korea)

28 July 2024
17:00

Brazil	1–2	Japan
Jheniffer 56'	Report	Kumagai 90+2' (pen.); Tanikawa 90+6'

Parc des Princes, Paris
Attendance: 40,918
Referee: Rebecca Welch (Great Britain)

31 July 2024
17:00

Brazil	0–2	Spain
	Report	Del Castillo 68'; Putellas 90+17'

Stade de Bordeaux, Bordeaux
Attendance: 14,497
Referee: Espen Eskås (Norway)

Quarter-finals

3 August 2024
21:00

France	0–1	Brazil
	Report	Gabi Portilho 82'

Stade de la Beaujoire, Nantes
Attendance: 32,280
Referee: Tori Penso (United States)

Semi-finals

6 August 2024
21:00

Brazil	4–2	Spain
Paredes 6' (o.g.); Gabi Portilho 45+4'; Adriana 71'; Kerolin 90+1'	Report	Duda Sampaio 85' (o.g.); Paralluelo 90+12'

Stade de Marseille, Marseille
Attendance: 14,201
Referee: Rebecca Welch (Great Britain)

Gold medal match

10 August 2024
17:00

Brazil	0–1	United States
	Report	Swanson 57'

Parc des Princes, Paris
Attendance: 43,813
Referee: Tess Olofsson (Sweden)

== Gymnastics ==
=== Artistic ===
Brazil's men team earned the right to send an individual gymnast to the Games by finishing as one of the three strongest non-qualified nations at the 2023 World Artistic Gymnastics Championships. Diogo Soares also officially booked his Olympic ticket at the same championships as one of the highest-ranked eight All-Around gymnasts who did not have a pathway to Paris as part of a qualified team. Meanwhile, five women gymnasts qualified for Paris by virtue of top nine all-around team, not yet qualified at the 2023 World Artistic Gymnastics Championships in Antwerp, Belgium. The full roster was announced on 23 June 2024.

Men

Individual

Athlete	Event	Qualification								Final							
Athlete	Event	Apparatus						Total	Rank	Apparatus						Total	Rank
Athlete	Event	FX	PH	SR	VT	PB	HB	Total	Rank	FX	PH	SR	VT	PB	HB	Total	Rank
Diogo Soares	All-around	13.100	13.600	13.033	14.200	13.933	14.133	81.999	19 Q	13.133	11.566	12.033	14.500	13.733	13.733	78.698	23
Arthur Mariano	Horizontal bar	—N/a					12.900	12.900	44	Did not advance							

Women

Team

Athlete	Event	Qualification						Final					
Athlete	Event	Apparatus				Total	Rank	Apparatus				Total	Rank
Athlete	Event	VT	UB	BB	FX	Total	Rank	VT	UB	BB	FX	Total	Rank
Rebeca Andrade	Team	14.900 Q	14.400	14.500 Q	13.900 Q	57.700	2 Q	15.100	14.533	14.133	14.200	—N/a	
Jade Barbosa	Team	13.733	~~12.733~~	~~13.100~~	13.500	53.066	20	13.366	—N/a			—N/a	
Lorrane Oliveira	Team	~~12.900~~	13.233	—N/a				—N/a	13.000	—N/a		—N/a	
Flávia Saraiva	Team	14.100	13.800	13.133	~~13.166~~	54.199	11 Q	13.900	13.666	13.433	13.533	—N/a	
Júlia Soares	Team	—N/a		13.800 Q	13.500	—N/a		—N/a		12.400	13.233	—N/a	
Total	Team	42.733	41.433	41.433	40.900	166.499	4 Q	41.665 (5)	42.665 (2)	41.199 (3)	39.965 (5)	164.497	3rd place, bronze medalist(s)

Individual finals

Athlete	Event	Qualification						Final					
Athlete	Event	Apparatus				Total	Rank	Apparatus				Total	Rank
Athlete	Event	V	UB	BB	F	Total	Rank	V	UB	BB	F	Total	Rank
Rebeca Andrade	All-around	See team results						15.100	14.666	14.133	14.033	57.932	2nd place, silver medalist(s)
Rebeca Andrade	Vault	14.683	—N/a			14.683	2 Q	14.966	—N/a			14.966	2nd place, silver medalist(s)
Rebeca Andrade	Balance beam	—N/a		14.500	—N/a	14.500	3 Q	—N/a		13.933	—N/a	13.933	4
Rebeca Andrade	Floor	—N/a			13.900	13.900	2 Q	—N/a			14.166	14.166	1st place, gold medalist(s)
Flávia Saraiva	All-around	See team results						13.633	13.900	14.266	12.233	54.032	9
Júlia Soares	Balance beam	—N/a		13.800	—N/a	13.800	8 Q	—N/a		12.333	—N/a	12.333	7

=== Rhythmic ===
Brazil entered a full-squad of rhythmic gymnastics and one individual into the games by virtue of the nation's results at the 2023 Rhythmic Gymnastics World Championships in Valencia, Spain. The full roster was announced on 5 July 2024.

Athlete	Event	Qualification						Final					
Athlete	Event	Hoop	Ball	Clubs	Ribbon	Total	Rank	Hoop	Ball	Clubs	Ribbon	Total	Rank
Bárbara Domingos	Individual	34.750	33.100	30.200	31.700	129.750	8 Q	29.600	33.200	31.200	29.100	123.100	10

Athletes	Event	Qualification				Final			
Athletes	Event	5 apps	3+2 apps	Total	Rank	5 apps	3+2 apps	Total	Rank
Maria Eduarda Arakaki; Victória Borges; Déborah Medrado; Sofia Pereira; Nicole Pircio	Group	35.950	24.950	60.900	9	Did not advance			

=== Trampoline ===
Brazil qualified one gymnast for the women's trampoline competition at Paris 2024 by finishing in the top eight at the 2023 Trampoline Gymnastics World Championships in Birmingham, Great Britain, and entered a male gymnast into the trampoline competition through the World Cup Series ranking. The full roster was announced on 30 June 2024.

Athlete	Event	Qualification		Final	
Athlete	Event	Score	Rank	Score	Rank
Rayan Dutra	Men's	56.370	12	Did not advance	
Camilla Gomes	Women's	50.580	15	Did not advance	

== Handball ==
Summary

Key:

- ET: After extra time
- P – Match decided by penalty-shootout.

Team	Event	Group stage						Quarterfinal	Semifinal	Final / BM	
Team	Event	Opposition Score	Opposition Score	Opposition Score	Opposition Score	Opposition Score	Rank	Opposition Score	Opposition Score	Opposition Score	Rank
Brazil women's	Women's tournament	Spain; W 29–18	Hungary; L 24–25	France; L 20–26	Netherlands; L 24–31	Angola; W 30–19	4 Q	Norway; L 15–32	Did not advance		7

=== Women's tournament ===
Brazil women's national handball team qualified for the Olympics as the winners of the handball competition at the 2023 Pan American Games in Viña del Mar, Chile.

Team roster

A 21-player squad was announced on 14 June 2024. The final squad was revealed on 4 July 2024.

Head coach: Cristiano Rocha

No.	Pos.	Name	Date of birth (age)	Height	App.	Goals	Club
1	GK	Gabriela Moreschi	8 July 1994 (aged 30)	1.90 m	79	0	(Romania) CSM București
2	LB	Bruna de Paula	26 September 1996 (aged 27)	1.70 m	102	332	(Hungary) Győri ETO KC
6	LB	Mariane Fernándes	4 January 1996 (aged 28)	1.65 m	49	113	(Poland) Zagłębie Lubin
7	P	Tamires Morena Lima	16 May 1994 (aged 30)	1.83 m	157	260	(Romania) Gloria Bistrița-Năsăud
10	RW	Jéssica Quintino	17 April 1991 (aged 33)	1.72 m	145	396	(Romania) Minaur Baia Mare
14	LW	Ana Cláudia Bolzan	15 July 1996 (aged 28)	1.77 m	29	49	(Portugal) Benfica
20	LW	Larissa Araújo	1 July 1992 (aged 32)	1.67 m	107	230	(Romania) CSM Corona Brașov
21	RW	Adriana Cardoso de Castro	29 October 1990 (aged 33)	1.67 m	85	360	Unknown
22	LB	Samara Vieira	7 October 1991 (aged 32)	1.83 m	49	85	(Turkey) Konyaaltı Bld. SK
23	RB	Giulia Guarieiro	24 July 1995 (aged 29)	1.74 m	55	84	(Spain) BM Granollers
30	RB	Gabriela Bitolo	1 April 1999 (aged 25)	1.80 m	27	35	(Spain) CBF Málaga Costa del Sol
36	P	Marcela Arounian	7 January 2000 (aged 24)	1.89 m	31	43	(Spain) BM Aula Cultural
42	CB	Jhennifer Lopes	28 July 2000 (aged 23)	1.76 m	26	15	(Spain) BM Remudas
49	CB	Patrícia Matieli	8 November 1988 (aged 35)	1.68 m	100	144	(Poland) Zagłębie Lubin
77	LB	Kelly Rosa	25 January 2004 (aged 20)	1.80 m	10	24	(Spain) CB Elche
87	GK	Renata Arruda	18 February 1999 (aged 25)	1.78 m	59	7	(Romania) Gloria Bistrița-Năsăud

Group play

Pos	Team	Pld	W	D	L	GF	GA	GD	Pts	Qualification
1	France (H)	5	5	0	0	159	124	+35	10	Quarterfinals
2	Netherlands	5	4	0	1	152	137	+15	8	Quarterfinals
3	Hungary	5	2	1	2	137	140	−3	5	Quarterfinals
4	Brazil	5	2	0	3	127	119	+8	4	Quarterfinals
5	Angola	5	1	1	3	131	154	−23	3	
6	Spain	5	0	0	5	111	143	−32	0	

Source: Olympics Paris 2024 rankings
Rules for classification: 1) Points; 2) Head-to-head points; 3) Head-to-head goal difference; 4) Head-to-head goals scored; 5) Goal difference; 6) Goals scored; 7) Draw.
(H) Hosts

25 July 2024; 14:00	Spain	18–29	Brazil	Paris Expo Porte de Versailles, Paris; Attendance: 5,765; Referees: Kurtagic, Wetterwik (SWE)
25 July 2024; 14:00	López 5	(10–15)	De Paula, Matieli 6	Paris Expo Porte de Versailles, Paris; Attendance: 5,765; Referees: Kurtagic, Wetterwik (SWE)
25 July 2024; 14:00	5× (suspension)	Report	5× (suspension)	Paris Expo Porte de Versailles, Paris; Attendance: 5,765; Referees: Kurtagic, Wetterwik (SWE)

28 July 2024; 09:00	Brazil	24–25	Hungary	Paris Expo Porte de Versailles, Paris; Attendance: 5,819; Referees: Jørum, Kleven (NOR)
28 July 2024; 09:00	three players 4	(15–12)	Simon 5	Paris Expo Porte de Versailles, Paris; Attendance: 5,819; Referees: Jørum, Kleven (NOR)
28 July 2024; 09:00	1× (yellow card) 2× (suspension)	Report	3× (suspension)	Paris Expo Porte de Versailles, Paris; Attendance: 5,819; Referees: Jørum, Kleven (NOR)

30 July 2024; 19:00	France	26–20	Brazil	Paris Expo Porte de Versailles, Paris; Attendance: 5,724; Referees: Kuttler, Merz (GER)
30 July 2024; 19:00	Foppa 7	(14–11)	De Paula 7	Paris Expo Porte de Versailles, Paris; Attendance: 5,724; Referees: Kuttler, Merz (GER)
30 July 2024; 19:00	2× (suspension)	Report	3× (suspension)	Paris Expo Porte de Versailles, Paris; Attendance: 5,724; Referees: Kuttler, Merz (GER)

1 August 2024; 09:00	Netherlands	31–24	Brazil	Paris Expo Porte de Versailles, Paris; Attendance: 5,653; Referees: A. Konjičanin, D. Konjičanin (BIH)
1 August 2024; 09:00	Van Wetering 6	(17–13)	Bitolo 7	Paris Expo Porte de Versailles, Paris; Attendance: 5,653; Referees: A. Konjičanin, D. Konjičanin (BIH)
1 August 2024; 09:00	1× (suspension)	Report	3× (suspension) 1× (red card)	Paris Expo Porte de Versailles, Paris; Attendance: 5,653; Referees: A. Konjičanin, D. Konjičanin (BIH)

3 August 2024; 14:00	Brazil	30–19	Angola	Paris Expo Porte de Versailles, Paris; Attendance: 5,801; Referees: Lah, Sok (SLO)
3 August 2024; 14:00	Bitolo 7	(14–6)	Pascoal 4	Paris Expo Porte de Versailles, Paris; Attendance: 5,801; Referees: Lah, Sok (SLO)
3 August 2024; 14:00	1× (yellow card) 2× (suspension)	Report	2× (yellow card) 1× (suspension)	Paris Expo Porte de Versailles, Paris; Attendance: 5,801; Referees: Lah, Sok (SLO)

Quarterfinal

6 August 2024; 21:30	Norway	32–15	Brazil	Stade Pierre-Mauroy, Lille; Attendance: 21,522; Referees: Kuttler, Merz (GER)
6 August 2024; 21:30	Jacobsen 6	(16–8)	De Paula, Guarieiro 3	Stade Pierre-Mauroy, Lille; Attendance: 21,522; Referees: Kuttler, Merz (GER)
6 August 2024; 21:30	1× (yellow card)	Report	1× (yellow card) 2× (suspension)	Stade Pierre-Mauroy, Lille; Attendance: 21,522; Referees: Kuttler, Merz (GER)

== Judo ==
In April 2024, the Brazilian Judo Confederation (CBJ) announced the first part of the call, calling ten athletes in advance, who are in good positions in the world rankings. Michel Augusto secured him olympic spot through the 2024 World Judo Championships, in Abu Dhabi, United Arab Emirates. Ketleyn Quadros got qualified via continental quota based on Olympic point rankings, and Natasha Ferreira entered under the reallocated continental quota (one of the quotas not used by another continent).

The full roster was announced on 24 June 2024.

Men

Athlete	Event	Round of 64	Round of 32	Round of 16	Quarterfinals	Semifinals	Repechage	Final / BM	
Athlete	Event	Opposition Result	Opposition Result	Opposition Result	Opposition Result	Opposition Result	Opposition Result	Opposition Result	Rank
Michel Augusto	−60 kg	—N/a	Sancho (CRC); W 01–00	Nagayama (JPN); L 00–10	Did not advance				
Willian Lima	−66 kg	—N/a	Nurillaev (UZB); W 01–00	Rahimov (TKM); W 10–00	Yondonperenlein (MGL); W 01–00	Kyrgyzbayev (KAZ); W 10–00	—N/a	Abe (JPN); L 00–10	2nd place, silver medalist(s)
Daniel Cargnin	−73 kg	—N/a	Gjakova (KOS); L 00–10	Did not advance					
Guilherme Schimidt	−81 kg	Bye	Šerifovski (MKD); W 10–00	Esposito (ITA); L 00–01	Did not advance				
Rafael Macedo	−90 kg	—N/a	van 't End (NED); W 10–00	Creț (ROU); W 10–00	Mosakhlishvili (ESP); L 00–01	—N/a	Han (KOR); W 11–00	Ngayap Hambou (FRA); L 00–10	5
Leonardo Gonçalves	−100 kg	—N/a	Kostoev (UAE); L 01–10	Did not advance					
Rafael Silva	+100 kg	—N/a	Kokauri (AZE); L 00–10	Did not advance					

Women

Athlete	Event	Round of 32	Round of 16	Quarterfinals	Semifinals	Repechage	Final / BM	
Athlete	Event	Opposition Result	Opposition Result	Opposition Result	Opposition Result	Opposition Result	Opposition Result	Rank
Natasha Ferreira	−48 kg	Tsunoda (JPN); L 00–11	Did not advance					
Larissa Pimenta	−52 kg	Silva (CPV); W 10–00	Giles (GBR); W 01–00	Buchard (FRA); L 00–01	—N/a	Ballhaus (GER); W 10–00	Giuffrida (ITA); W 10–00	3rd place, bronze medalist(s)
Rafaela Silva	−57 kg	Bye	Pardayeva (TKM); W 10–00	Liparteliani (GEO); W 10–00	Huh (KOR); L 00–01	—N/a	Funakubo (JPN); L 00–10	5
Ketleyn Quadros	−63 kg	Cabaña (ESP); W 10–00	Agbegnenou (FRA); L 00–01	Did not advance				
Mayra Aguiar	−78 kg	Bye	Bellandi (ITA); L 00–01	Did not advance				
Beatriz Souza	+78 kg	Bye	Marenco (NCA); W 10–00	Kim (KOR); W 01–00	Dicko (FRA); W 10–00	—N/a	Hershko (ISR); W 01–00	1st place, gold medalist(s)

Mixed

Athlete	Event	Round of 32	Round of 16	Quarterfinals	Semifinals	Repechage	Final / BM	
Athlete	Event	Opposition Result	Opposition Result	Opposition Result	Opposition Result	Opposition Result	Opposition Result	Rank
Willian Lima; Daniel Cargnin; Guilherme Schimidt; Rafael Macedo; Leonardo Gonçalves; Rafael Silva; Larissa Pimenta; Rafaela Silva; Ketleyn Quadros; Beatriz Souza	Team	Bye	Kazakhstan; W 4–2	Germany; L 3–4	—N/a	Serbia; W 4–1	Italy; W 4–3	3rd place, bronze medalist(s)

== Modern pentathlon ==
Brazilian modern pentathletes confirmed a single quota place for Paris 2024. Isabela Abreu secured one of two available South American berth in the women's event at the 2023 Pan American Games in Santiago, Chile.

Athlete	Event	Fencing ranking round (épée one touch)			Semifinal													Final												
Athlete	Event	Fencing ranking round (épée one touch)			Fencing	Swimming (200 m freestyle)			Riding (show jumping)				Shooting / Running (10 m laser pistol / 3000 m cross-country)			Total points	Final rank	Fencing	Swimming			Riding				Shooting / Running			Total points	Final rank
Athlete	Event	V–D	Rank	MP points	BR	Time	Rank	MP points	Time	Penalties	Rank	MP points	Time	Rank	MP points	Total points	Final rank	BR	Time	Rank	MP points	Time	Penalties	Rank	MP points	Time	Rank	MP points	Total points	Final rank
Isabela Abreu	Women's	10–25	36	175	0	2:25.63	16	259	68.05	12	12	288	12:22.30	14	558	1280	16	Did not advance												

== Rowing ==
Brazilian rowers qualified two boats, each in the men's and women's single sculls for the Games through the 2024 Americas Qualification Regatta in Rio de Janeiro, Brazil.

Athlete	Event	Heats		Repechage		Quarterfinals		Semifinals		Final	
Athlete	Event	Time	Rank	Time	Rank	Time	Rank	Time	Rank	Time	Rank
Lucas Verthein	Men's single sculls	6:54.96	3 QF	Bye		6:55.36	4 SC/D	6:55.07	1 FC	6:47.37	15
Beatriz Tavares	Women's single sculls	7:49.66	3 QF	Bye		7:47.29	4 SC/D	7:49.96	3 FC	7:31.31	15

Qualification Legend: FA=Final A (medal); FB=Final B (non-medal); FC=Final C (non-medal); FD=Final D (non-medal); FE=Final E (non-medal); FF=Final F (non-medal); SA/B=Semifinals A/B; SC/D=Semifinals C/D; SE/F=Semifinals E/F; QF=Quarterfinals; R=Repechage

== Rugby sevens ==
Summary

Team	Event	Pool round				Quarterfinal	Semifinal / Cl.	Final / BM / Cl.	
Team	Event	Opposition Result	Opposition Result	Opposition Result	Rank	Opposition Result	Opposition Result	Opposition Result	Rank
Brazil women's	Women's tournament	France; L 0–26	United States; L 5–24	Japan; L 12–39	4	—N/a	Classification 9–12th Fiji; W 28–22	Ninth place match Japan; L 7–38	10

=== Women's tournament ===
Brazil women's national rugby sevens team qualified for the Olympics by winning the gold medal and securing an outright berth at the 2023 Sudamérica Olympic Qualifying Tournament in Montevideo, Uruguay.

Team roster

Brazil's squad of 12 players was named on 3 July 2024. Additionally, Leila Cássia Silva and Aline Furtado were named as traveling reserves.

Head coach: Will Broderick

- Mariana Nicolau
- Luiza Campos (c)
- Milena Mariano
- Gisele Gomes
- Thalia Costa
- Thalita Costa
- Yasmim Soares
- Marina Fioravanti
- Gabriela Lima
- Raquel Kochhann
- Bianca Silva
- Marcelle Souza

Group stage

Pos	Team	Pld	W	D	L	PF	PA	PD	Pts	Qualification
1	France (H)	3	3	0	0	106	14	+92	9	Quarter-finals
2	United States	3	2	0	1	74	43	+31	7	Quarter-finals
3	Japan	3	1	0	2	46	97	−51	5	
4	Brazil	3	0	0	3	17	89	−72	3	

Source: World Rugby
Rules for classification: 1) Points; 2) Head-to-head result; 3) Point difference; 4) Points scored.
(H) Hosts

28 July 2024
17:00

France	26–0	Brazil
Try: Grisez 3' c Pelle 5' c Okemba 11' c Jason 15' m Con: Drouin (3/4) 4', 5', 11'	World Rugby

Stade de France, Paris
Referee: Cisco Lopez (United States)

28 July 2024
20:00

United States	24–5	Brazil
Try: Kelter 1' m Sullivan 8' c Maher 11' m Sedrick 15' c Con: Kelter (2/3) 9', 15'	World Rugby	Try: Thalia Costa 6' m

Stade de France, Paris
Referee: Tyler Miller (Australia)

29 July 2024
15:00

Japan	39–12	Brazil
Try: Tsutsumi (2) 1' c, 10' m Saegusa 4' c Utsumi 6' m Kajiki (2) 6' m, 9' m Tanaka 14' m Con: Nishi (1/2) 1'; Tsutsumi (1/1) 5'	World Rugby	Try: Thalita Costa 7' m Lima 13' c Con: Fioravanti (1/1) 13'

Stade de France, Paris
Referee: Maggie Cogger-Orr (New Zealand)

9–12th place playoff semi-final

29 July 2024
20:30

Fiji	22–28	Brazil
Try: Buleki 2' m Naimasi (2) 4' m, 13' c Likuceva 11'; Con: Naimasi (1/2) 13'	World Rugby	Try: Lima (2) 1' c, 8' c Costa 6' c Soares 15' c Con: Kochhann (4/4) 1', 6', 8', 15'

Stade de France, Paris
Referee: Talal Chaudhry (Canada)

Ninth place match

30 July 2024
17:00

Japan	38–7	Brazil
Try: Kajiki 1' c Utsumi 3' c Ohtani 6' m Hirano 10' c Matsuda 13' c Tanaka 14' m Con: Utsumi (2/3) 1', 3'; Hirano (1/1) 10'; Nishi (1/2) 13'	World Rugby	Try: Soares 16' c Con: Kochhann (1/1) 16'

Stade de France, Paris
Referee: Lavenia Rawaca (Fiji)

== Sailing ==
Brazilian sailors (7 male and 5 female) qualified one boat in each of the following classes through the 2023 Sailing World Championships in The Hague, Netherlands; 2023 Pan American Games in Santiago, Chile; the 2024 ILCA 6 World Championships in Mar del Plata, Argentina; 2024 470 World Championships in Palma de Mallorca, Spain, and 2024 Last Chance Regatta in Hyeres, France.

Elimination events

Athlete	Event	Opening series															Quarterfinal	Semifinal								Final							
Athlete	Event	1	2	3	4	5	6	7	8	9	10	11	12	13	Net points	Rank	Rank	1	2	3	4	5	6	Total	Rank	1	2	3	4	5	6	Total	Rank
Mateus Isaac	Men's IQFoil	~~25~~	2	14	8	13	15	16	18	15	8	~~19~~	16	5	130	16	Did not advance																
Bruno Lobo	Men's Formula Kite	3	7	~~10~~	4	~~15~~	9	5	—N/a						28	7 Q	—N/a	1	3	—N/a				1	3	Did not advance							

Medal race events

Athlete	Event	Race													Net points	Final rank
Athlete	Event	1	2	3	4	5	6	7	8	9	10	11	12	M*	Net points	Final rank
Bruno Fontes	Men's ILCA 7	31	31	6	30	32	34	25	6	—N/a				EL	161	28
Marco Grael; Gabriel Simões	Men's 49er	~~21~~	14	16	20	16	18	9	10	16	12	19	16	EL	166	19
Gabriella Kidd	Women's ILCA 6	15	6	15	34	23	30	~~44~~	34	41	—N/a			EL	198	33
Martine Grael; Kahena Kunze	Women's 49erFX	13	5	6	~~21~~	19	12	10	9	13	4	9	2	10	112.0	8
Henrique Haddad; Isabel Swan	Mixed 470	12	12	10	12	9	8	~~13~~	1	—N/a				20	84	10
João Siemsen; Marina Arndt	Mixed Nacra 17	~~14~~	10	11	11	5	11	5	14	7	8	13	14	6	115	10

M = Medal race; EL = Eliminated – did not advance into the medal race

== Shooting ==
Brazilian shooters achieved quota places for the following events based on their results at 2022 and 2024 Championships of the Americas.

Athlete	Event	Qualification		Final	
Athlete	Event	Points	Rank	Points	Rank
Philipe Chateaubrian	Men's 10 m air pistol	561	31	Did not advance	
Geovana Meyer	Women's 10 m air rifle	623.5	38	Did not advance	
Geovana Meyer	Women's 50 m rifle three positions	581	22	Did not advance	
Georgia Furquim	Women's skeet	111	26	Did not advance	

== Skateboarding ==
Brazil entered twelve skateboarders (six per gender) to compete in each of the following events at the Games through the 2024 Olympic Qualifier Series in Shanghai, China and Budapest, Hungary.

Park

Athlete	Event	Qualification		Final	
Athlete	Event	Score	Rank	Score	Rank
Augusto Akio	Men's	88.98	8 Q	91.85	3rd place, bronze medalist(s)
Pedro Barros	Men's	89.24	6 Q	91.65	4
Luigi Cini	Men's	89.10	7 Q	76.89	7
Isadora Pacheco	Women's	82.07	9	Did not advance	
Dora Varella	Women's	82.29	8 Q	89.14	4
Raicca Ventura	Women's	76.24	12	Did not advance	

Street

Athlete	Event	Qualification		Final	
Athlete	Event	Score	Rank	Score	Rank
Felipe Gustavo	Men's	157.89	15	Did not advance	
Kelvin Hoefler	Men's	265.24	6 Q	270.27	6
Giovanni Vianna	Men's	178.52	13	Did not advance	
Rayssa Leal	Women's	241.43	7 Q	253.37	3rd place, bronze medalist(s)
Gabriela Mazetto	Women's	144.35	19	Did not advance	
Pâmela Rosa	Women's	205.23	16	Did not advance	

== Surfing ==
Brazilian surfers confirmed six shortboard quota places (three male and three female) for Tahiti. World-number-one Filipe Toledo, João Chianca and Tokyo 2020 Olympian Tatiana Weston-Webb finished among the top ten (men) and top eight (women) of those eligible for qualification in their respective shortboard races based on the results aggregated in the 2023 World Surf League rankings. Meanwhile, the other surfers, Tainá Hinckel, Gabriel Medina and Luana Silva, entered the games through the top eight individuals women's surfer, not yet qualified; and the best team, both for men and women, to grab the third quota for the nations, at the 2024 World Surfing Games in Arecibo, Puerto Rico. Brazil will be the only NOC to send the maximum number of surfers (3 men and 3 women) to the 2024 Summer Olympics.

Athlete	Event	Round 1		Round 2	Round 3	Quarterfinal	Semifinal	Final / BM	
Athlete	Event	Score	Rank	Opposition Result	Opposition Result	Opposition Result	Opposition Result	Opposition Result	Rank
Filipe Toledo	Men's shortboard	7.63	2 R2	Stairmand (NZL); W 17.00–14.00	Inaba (JPN); L 2.46–6.00	Did not advance			
João Chianca	Men's shortboard	10.07	1 R3	Bye	Boukhiam (MAR); W 18.10–17.80	Medina (BRA); L 9.33–14.77	Did not advance		
Gabriel Medina	Men's shortboard	13.50	1 R3	Bye	Igarashi (JPN); W 17.40–7.04	Chianca (BRA); W 14.77–9.33	Robinson (AUS); L 6.33–12.33	Correa (PER); W 15.54–12.43	3rd place, bronze medalist(s)
Tatiana Weston-Webb	Women's shortboard	10.33	2 R2	Resano (NCA); W 9.50–3.30	Simmers (USA); W 12.34–1.93	Erostarbe (ESP); W 8.10–6.34	Hennessy (CRC); W 13.66–6.17	Marks (USA); L 10.33–10.50	2nd place, silver medalist(s)
Tainá Hinckel	Women's shortboard	5.73	2 R2	Dempfle-Olin (CAN); W 7.10–6.30	Silva (BRA); L 5.93–6.00	Did not advance			
Luana Silva	Women's shortboard	7.27	1 R3	Bye	Hinckel (BRA); W 6.00–5.93	Hennessy (CRC); L 5.47–6.37	Did not advance		

Qualification legend: R3 – Qualifies to elimination rounds; R2 – Qualifies to repechage round

== Swimming ==
Brazilian swimmers achieved the entry standards in the following events for Paris 2024 (a maximum of two swimmers under the Olympic Qualifying Time (OST) and potentially at the Olympic Consideration Time (OCT)): To secure their nomination to the Olympic team, swimmers must finish in the top two of each individual pool event under the World Aquatics A-cut at the Brazilian Olympic Trials.

The Brazilian Confederation of Aquatic Sports published its Olympic qualification criteria in November 2023. The national selection, in 2024, will be the main competition for obtaining entry standards, but in events in which the country has already achieved entry standards, the quota is secured. Therefore, Brazil has classified the following athletes based on the times obtained in the World Aquatics Championships.

Men

Athlete	Event	Heat		Semifinal		Final	
Athlete	Event	Time	Rank	Time	Rank	Time	Rank
Guilherme Caribé	50 m freestyle	22.31	=33	Did not advance			
Guilherme Caribé	100 m freestyle	48.35	12 Q	48.03	10	Did not advance	
Marcelo Chierighini	100 m freestyle	49.38	35	Did not advance			
Eduardo Moraes	400 m freestyle	3:51.74	28	—N/a		Did not advance	
Guilherme Costa	200 m freestyle	DNS		Did not advance			
Guilherme Costa	400 m freestyle	3:44.23	2 Q	—N/a		3:42.76 AM	5
Guilherme Costa	800 m freestyle	7:54.41	20	—N/a		Did not advance	
Guilherme Costa	10 km open water	—N/a				DNF	
Kayky Mota	100 m butterfly	52.11	22	Did not advance			
Nicolas Albiero	200 m butterfly	1:56.49	18	Did not advance			
Guilherme Caribé; Marcelo Chierighini; Gabriel Santos; Breno Correia	4 × 100 m freestyle relay	3:14.22	10	—N/a		Did not advance	
Guilherme Costa; Fernando Scheffer; Murilo Sartori; Eduardo Moraes	4 × 200 m freestyle relay	7:10.26	12	—N/a		Did not advance	

Women

Athlete	Event	Heat		Semifinal		Final	
Athlete	Event	Time	Rank	Time	Rank	Time	Rank
Maria Fernanda Costa	200 m freestyle	1:56.65	8 Q	1:56.89	11	Did not advance	
Maria Fernanda Costa	400 m freestyle	4:03.47	7 Q	—N/a		4:03.53	7
Maria Fernanda Costa	800 m freestyle	8:32.20	10	—N/a		Did not advance	
Gabrielle Roncatto	400 m freestyle	4:10.46	16	—N/a		Did not advance	
Beatriz Dizotti	1500 m freestyle	16:05.40	7 Q	—N/a		16:02.86	7
Ana Carolina Vieira; Stephanie Balduccini; Giovana Reis; Maria Paula Heitmann	4 × 100 m freestyle relay	3:40.60	12	—N/a		Did not advance	
Maria Fernanda Costa; Gabrielle Roncatto; Stephanie Balduccini; Maria Paula Heitmann	4 × 200 m freestyle relay	7:52.81	5 Q	—N/a		7:52.90	7
Ana Marcela Cunha	10 km open water	—N/a				2:04:15.7	4
Viviane Jungblut	10 km open water	—N/a				2:06:15.8	11

Mixed

Athlete	Event	Heat		Final	
Athlete	Event	Result	Rank	Result	Rank
Guilherme Basseto; Gabrielle Roncatto; Nicolas Albiero; Stephanie Balduccini	4 × 100 m medley relay	3:57.27	16	Did not advance	

== Table tennis ==
Brazil entered full-squad of men's and women's athletes into the table tennis competition at the games, by virtue of the top two results in the men's and women's team competition through the 2023 Pan American Table Tennis Championship in Havana, Cuba. And also qualified a mixed double to the 2024 Summer Olympics at the 2023 Pan American Games in Santiago, Chile.

The full roster was announced on 4 June 2024.

Men

Athlete	Event	Preliminary	Round of 64	Round of 32	Round of 16	Quarterfinals	Semifinals	Final / BM	
Athlete	Event	Opposition Result	Opposition Result	Opposition Result	Opposition Result	Opposition Result	Opposition Result	Opposition Result	Rank
Hugo Calderano	Singles	Bye	Pereira (CUB); W 4–0	Robles (ESP); W 4–2	A. Lebrun (FRA); W 4–1	Jang (KOR); W 4–0	Möregårdh (SWE); L 2–4	F. Lebrun (FRA); L 0–4	4
Vitor Ishiy	Singles	Bye	Lum (AUS); W 4–0	Ovtcharov (GER); L 1–4	Did not advance				
Hugo Calderano; Vitor Ishiy; Guilherme Teodoro	Team	—N/a			Portugal; W 3–1	France; L 0–3	Did not advance		

Women

Athlete	Event	Preliminary	Round of 64	Round of 32	Round of 16	Quarterfinals	Semifinals	Final / BM	
Athlete	Event	Opposition Result	Opposition Result	Opposition Result	Opposition Result	Opposition Result	Opposition Result	Opposition Result	Rank
Bruna Takahashi	Singles	Bye	Offiong (NGR); W 4–0	Zhang (USA); L 2–4	Did not advance				
Giulia Takahashi	Singles	Bye	Sun (CHN); L 0–4	Did not advance					
Bruna Takahashi; Giulia Takahashi; Bruna Alexandre	Team	—N/a			South Korea; L 1–3	Did not advance			

Mixed

Athlete	Event	Round of 16	Quarterfinal	Semifinal	Final / BM	
Athlete	Event	Opposition Result	Opposition Result	Opposition Result	Opposition Result	Rank
Vitor Ishiy; Bruna Takahashi	Doubles	Robles / Xiao (ESP); L 2–4	Did not advance			

== Taekwondo ==
Brazil qualified four athletes to compete at the 2024 Olympic Games. Caroline Santos qualified for Paris 2024 by virtue of finishing sixth in the Olympic rankings in her division and receiving a re-allocated spot. Edival Pontes, Maria Clara Pacheco and Henrique Marques secured their spots through the 2024 Pan American Qualification Tournament, in Santo Domingo, Dominican Republic.

Men

Athlete	Event	Qualification	Round of 16	Quarterfinals	Semifinals	Repechage	Final / BM	
Athlete	Event	Opposition Result	Opposition Result	Opposition Result	Opposition Result	Opposition Result	Opposition Result	Rank
Edival Pontes	–68 kg	Bye	Kareem (JOR); L 1–2	—N/a		Reçber (TUR); W 2–1	Pérez (ESP); W 2–1	3rd place, bronze medalist(s)
Henrique Marques	–80 kg	Bye	El-Sharabaty (JOR); W 2–0	Seo (KOR); L 0–2	Did not advance			

Women

Athlete	Event	Round of 16	Quarterfinals	Semifinals	Repechage	Final / BM	
Athlete	Event	Opposition Result	Opposition Result	Opposition Result	Opposition Result	Opposition Result	Rank
Maria Clara Pacheco	–57 kg	Hymer (AUS); W 2–0	Luo (CHN); L 1–2	Did not advance			
Caroline Santos	–67 kg	Tongchan (THA); L 0–2	Did not advance				

== Tennis ==
Brazil entered four tennis player into the Olympic tournament. Laura Pigossi secured an outright berth by winning the women's singles title at the 2023 Pan American Games in Santiago, Chile. Beatriz Haddad Maia is classified by her world top20 ranking, and by the fact that she is the highest ranked Brazilian in the WTA. Thiago Seyboth Wild and Thiago Monteiro secured their quota places through the ATP ranking and the 2023 Pan American Games, respectively. Monteiro was the bronze medalist in the Pan American Games, replaced the gold medalist Facundo Díaz Acosta of Argentina. While Haddad Maia and Luisa Stefani secured their spot in the women's doubles competition through the WTA combined ranking.

Men

Athlete	Event	Round of 64	Round of 32	Round of 16	Quarterfinal	Semifinal	Final / BM	
Athlete	Event	Opposition Result	Opposition Result	Opposition Result	Opposition Result	Opposition Result	Opposition Result	Rank
Thiago Monteiro	Singles	Báez (ARG); L 4–6, 3–6	Did not advance					
Thiago Seyboth Wild	Singles	Etcheverry (ARG); L 6–7^{(7–9)}, 2–6	Did not advance					
Thiago Monteiro; Thiago Seyboth Wild	Doubles	—N/a	Bublik / Nedovyesov (KAZ); W 6–4, 6–4	Krajicek / Ram (USA); L 4–6, 6–7^{(3–7)}	Did not advance			

Women

Athlete	Event	Round of 64	Round of 32	Round of 16	Quarterfinal	Semifinal	Final / BM	
Athlete	Event	Opposition Result	Opposition Result	Opposition Result	Opposition Result	Opposition Result	Opposition Result	Rank
Beatriz Haddad Maia	Singles	Gracheva (FRA); W 6–4, 4–6, 6–0	Schmiedlová (SVK); L 4–6, 4–6	Did not advance				
Laura Pigossi	Singles	Yastremska (UKR); L 6–3, 5–7, 0–6	Did not advance					
Beatriz Haddad Maia; Luisa Stefani	Doubles	—N/a	Yuan / Zhang (CHN); W 6–4, 6–4	Boulter / Watson (GBR); L 3–6, 4–6	Did not advance			

Mixed

Athlete	Event	Round of 16	Quarterfinal	Semifinal	Final / BM	
Athlete	Event	Opposition Result	Opposition Result	Opposition Result	Opposition Result	Rank
Thiago Seyboth Wild; Luisa Stefani	Doubles	Zhang / Xin Wang (CHN); L 6–3, 3–6, [8–10]	Did not advance			

== Triathlon ==
Brazil confirmed four quota places (two per gender) for the triathlon competition at the 2024 Summer Olympics through the Triathlon Olympic Ranking.

Individual

Athlete	Event	Time						Rank
Athlete	Event	Swim (1.5 km)	Trans 1	Bike (40 km)	Trans 2	Run (10 km)	Total	Rank
Miguel Hidalgo	Men's	20:57	0:53	51:36	0:25	30:36	1:44:27	10
Manoel Messias	Men's	23:08	0:53	54:21	0:31	32:07	1:51:00	45
Djenyfer Arnold	Women's	24:03	0:56	57:49	0:26	35:31	1:58:45	20
Vittória Lopes	Women's	22:18	0:57	59:42	0:32	36:41	2:00:10	25

Relay

Athlete	Event	Time						Rank
Athlete	Event	Swim (300 m)	Trans 1	Bike (7 km)	Trans 2	Run (2 km)	Total group	Rank
Miguel Hidalgo	Mixed relay	4:08	1:07	9:40	0:22	5:06	20:23	—N/a
Djenyfer Arnold	Mixed relay	5:03	1:10	10:21	0:27	5:43	22:44	—N/a
Manoel Messias	Mixed relay	4:34	1:04	9:33	0:25	5:06	20:42	—N/a
Vittória Lopes	Mixed relay	4:59	1:13	10:46	0:27	6:09	23:34	—N/a
Total	Mixed relay	—N/a					1:27:23	8

== Volleyball ==
=== Beach ===
Brazilian two female beach volleyball teams qualified directly for the Olympics by virtue of the FIVB Olympic Ranking. The first male pair to guarantee a place, Stein/Wanderley, confirmed their classification via ranking due to the withdrawal of Pedro Solberg/Guto from the Elite 16 in Brasília, Brazil, a stage of the 2024 world circuit. Arthur/Evandro guaranteed classification with the title campaign in the Elite 16 of Brasília.

Athletes	Event	Preliminary round				Round of 16	Quarterfinals	Semifinals	Finals	Rank
Athletes	Event	Opposition Score	Opposition Score	Opposition Score	Rank	Opposition Score	Opposition Score	Opposition Score	Opposition Score	Rank
André Stein; George Wanderley	Men's tournament	Abicha / El Graoui (MAR); W (21–18, 21–10)	Díaz / Alayo (CUB); L (13–21, 18–21)	Partain / Benesh (USA); L (17–21, 21–14, 8–15)	3 Q	Ehlers / Wickler (GER); L (16–21, 17–21)	Did not advance			9
Arthur Lanci; Evandro Oliveira	Men's tournament	Hörl / Horst (AUT); W (21–18, 21–19)	Schachter / Dearing (CAN); W (21–13, 21–16)	Perušič / Schweiner (CZE); W (21–18, 21–16)	1 Q	Van de Velde / Immers (NED); W (21–16, 21–16)	Åhman / Hellvig (SWE); L (17–21, 16–21)	Did not advance		5
Ana Patrícia Ramos; Duda Lisboa	Women's tournament	Abdelhady / Elghobashy (EGY); W (21–14, 21–19)	Fernández / Soria (ESP); W (21–12, 21–13)	Gottardi / Menegatti (ITA); W (21–17, 21–10)	1 Q	Akiko / Ishii (JPN); W (21–15, 21–16)	Tīna / Anastasija (LAT); W (21–16, 21–10)	Mariafe / Clancy (AUS); W (20–22, 21–15, 15–12)	Melissa / Brandie (CAN); W (26–24, 12–21, 15–10)	1st place, gold medalist(s)
Bárbara Seixas; Carolina Solberg Salgado	Women's tournament	Akiko / Ishii (JPN); W (21–12, 21–19)	Paulikienė / Raupelytė (LTU); W (21–13, 21–14)	Stam / Schoon (NED); W (16–21, 21–17, 19–17)	1 Q	Mariafe / Clancy (AUS); L (22–24, 14–21)	Did not advance			9

=== Indoor ===
Summary

Team	Event	Group stage				Quarterfinal	Semifinal	Final / BM	
Team	Event	Opposition Score	Opposition Score	Opposition Score	Rank	Opposition Score	Opposition Score	Opposition Score	Rank
Brazil men's	Men's tournament	Italy; L 1–3	Poland; L 2–3	Egypt; W 3–0	3 Q	United States; L 1–3	Did not advance		
Brazil women's	Women's tournament	Kenya; W 3–0	Japan; W 3–0	Poland; W 3–0	1 Q	Dominican Republic; W 3–0	United States; L 2–3	Turkey; W 3–1	3rd place, bronze medalist(s)

==== Men's tournament ====
Brazil men's volleyball team qualified for the Games by securing an outright berth as one of the two highest-ranked nations at the Olympic Qualification Tournament in Rio de Janeiro, Brazil.

Team roster

The roster was announced on 7 July 2024.

Head coach: Bernardo Rezende

- 1 Bruno Rezende (c) S
- 2 Lukas Bergmann OH
- 6 Adriano Xavier OH
- 9 Yoandy Leal OH
- 12 Isac Santos MB
- 14 Fernando Kreling S
- 16 Lucas Saatkamp MB
- 17 Thales Hoss L
- 18 Ricardo Lucarelli OH
- 21 Alan Souza OP
- 23 Flávio Gualberto MB
- 28 Darlan Souza OP

Group play

Pos	Team	Pld	W	L	Pts	SW	SL	SR	SPW	SPL	SPR	Qualification
1	Italy	3	3	0	9	9	2	4.500	269	224	1.201	Quarterfinals
2	Poland	3	2	1	5	7	5	1.400	260	256	1.016	Quarterfinals
3	Brazil	3	1	2	4	6	6	1.000	273	241	1.133	Quarterfinals
4	Egypt	3	0	3	0	0	9	0.000	144	225	0.640	

Source: Olympics
Rules for classification: Tiebreakers

27 July 2024; 13:00	Italy	3–1	Brazil	South Paris Arena 1, Paris; Attendance: 9,485; Referees: Vladimir Simonovic (SUI), Scott Dziewirz (CAN)
27 July 2024; 13:00	(25–23, 27–25, 18–25, 25–21); P2 Report			South Paris Arena 1, Paris; Attendance: 9,485; Referees: Vladimir Simonovic (SUI), Scott Dziewirz (CAN)

31 July 2024; 09:00	Poland	3–2	Brazil	South Paris Arena 1, Paris; Attendance: 9,464; Referees: Stefano Cesare (ITA), Denny Cespedes (DOM)
31 July 2024; 09:00	(22–25, 25–19, 19–25, 25–23, 15–12); P2 Report			South Paris Arena 1, Paris; Attendance: 9,464; Referees: Stefano Cesare (ITA), Denny Cespedes (DOM)

2 August 2024; 13:00	Brazil	3–0	Egypt	South Paris Arena 1, Paris; Attendance: 9,407; Referees: Scott Dziewirz (CAN), Wang Ziling (CHN)
2 August 2024; 13:00	(25–11, 25–13, 25–16); P2 Report			South Paris Arena 1, Paris; Attendance: 9,407; Referees: Scott Dziewirz (CAN), Wang Ziling (CHN)

Quarterfinal

5 August 2024; 21:00	United States	3–1	Brazil	South Paris Arena 1, Paris; Attendance: 9,346; Referees: Vladimir Simonović (SUI), Fabrice Collados (FRA)
5 August 2024; 21:00	(26–24, 28–30, 25–19, 25–19); P2 Report			South Paris Arena 1, Paris; Attendance: 9,346; Referees: Vladimir Simonović (SUI), Fabrice Collados (FRA)

==== Women's tournament ====
Brazil women's volleyball team qualified for the Games by securing an outright berth as the one of two highest-ranked nations at the Olympic Qualification Tournament in Tokyo, Japan.

Team roster

The roster was announced on 4 July 2024.

Head coach: Zé Roberto

- 1 Nyeme Costa L
- 2 Diana Duarte MB
- 3 Macris Carneiro S
- 6 Thaísa Menezes MB
- 7 Rosamaria Montibeller OH
- 9 Roberta Ratzke S
- 10 Gabriela Guimarães (c) OH
- 12 Ana Cristina de Souza OH
- 15 Ana Carolina da Silva MB
- 17 Júlia Bergmann OH
- 19 Tainara Santos OP
- 24 Lorenne Teixeira OP

Group play

Pos	Team	Pld	W	L	Pts	SW	SL	SR	SPW	SPL	SPR	Qualification
1	Brazil	3	3	0	9	9	0	MAX	238	165	1.442	Quarter-finals
2	Poland	3	2	1	6	6	4	1.500	244	230	1.061	Quarter-finals
3	Japan	3	1	2	3	4	6	0.667	226	224	1.009	
4	Kenya	3	0	3	0	0	9	0.000	136	225	0.604	

Source: Olympics
Rules for classification: Tiebreakers

29 July 2024; 13:00	Brazil	3–0	Kenya	South Paris Arena 1, Paris; Attendance: 9,275; Referees: Wang Ziling (CHN), Juraj Mokrý (SVK)
29 July 2024; 13:00	(25–14, 25–13, 25–12); P2 Report			South Paris Arena 1, Paris; Attendance: 9,275; Referees: Wang Ziling (CHN), Juraj Mokrý (SVK)

1 August 2024; 13:00	Brazil	3–0	Japan	South Paris Arena 1, Paris; Attendance: 9,410; Referees: Epaminondas Gerothodoros (GRE), Nurper Özbar (TUR)
1 August 2024; 13:00	(25–20, 25–17, 25–18); P2 Report			South Paris Arena 1, Paris; Attendance: 9,410; Referees: Epaminondas Gerothodoros (GRE), Nurper Özbar (TUR)

4 August 2024; 21:00	Brazil	3–0	Poland	South Paris Arena 1, Paris; Attendance: 9,505; Referees: Fabrice Collados (FRA), Denny Cespedes (DOM)
4 August 2024; 21:00	(25–21, 38–36, 25–14); P2 Report			South Paris Arena 1, Paris; Attendance: 9,505; Referees: Fabrice Collados (FRA), Denny Cespedes (DOM)

Quarterfinal

6 August 2024; 13:00	Brazil	3–0	Dominican Republic	South Paris Arena 1, Paris; Attendance: 9,315; Referees: Sumie Myoi (JPN), Stefano Cesare (ITA)
6 August 2024; 13:00	(25–22, 25–13, 25–17); P2 Report			South Paris Arena 1, Paris; Attendance: 9,315; Referees: Sumie Myoi (JPN), Stefano Cesare (ITA)

Semifinal

8 August 2024; 16:00	Brazil	2–3	United States	South Paris Arena 1, Paris; Attendance: 9,253; Referees: Juraj Mokrý (SVK), Karina Rene (ARG)
8 August 2024; 16:00	(23–25, 25–18, 15–25, 25–23, 11–15); P2 Report			South Paris Arena 1, Paris; Attendance: 9,253; Referees: Juraj Mokrý (SVK), Karina Rene (ARG)

Bronze medal game

10 August 2024; 17:15	Brazil	3–1	Turkey	South Paris Arena 1, Paris; Attendance: 9,151; Referees: Sumie Myoi (JPN), Karina Rene (ARG)
10 August 2024; 17:15	(25–21, 27–25, 22–25, 25–15); P2 Report			South Paris Arena 1, Paris; Attendance: 9,151; Referees: Sumie Myoi (JPN), Karina Rene (ARG)

== Weightlifting ==
Brazil qualified two female weightlifters to the 2024 Summer Olympics through the IWF Olympic Qualification Rankings.

Athlete	Event	Snatch		Clean & Jerk		Total	Rank
Athlete	Event	Result	Rank	Result	Rank	Total	Rank
Amanda Schott	Women's −71 kg	106	7	123	9	229	8
Laura Amaro	Women's −81 kg	105	7	135	7	240	7

== Wrestling ==
Brazil qualified one wrestler into the Olympic competition. Giullia Penalber qualified for the games through the 2024 World Qualification Tournament in Istanbul, Turkey.

Key:

- VT (ranking points: 5–0 or 0–5) – Victory by fall.
- VB (ranking points: 5–0 or 0–5) – Victory by injury (VF for forfeit, VA for withdrawal or disqualification)
- PP (ranking points: 3–1 or 1–3) – Decision by points – the loser with technical points.
- PO (ranking points: 3–0 or 0–3) – Decision by points – the loser without technical points.
- ST (ranking points: 4–0 or 0–4) – Great superiority – the loser without technical points and a margin of victory of at least 8 (Greco-Roman) or 10 (freestyle) points.
- SP (ranking points: 4–1 or 1–4) – Technical superiority – the loser with technical points and a margin of victory of at least 8 (Greco-Roman) or 10 (freestyle) points.

Women

Athlete	Event	Round of 16	Quarterfinal	Semifinal	Repechage	Final / BM	
Athlete	Event	Opposition Result	Opposition Result	Opposition Result	Opposition Result	Opposition Result	Rank
Giullia Penalber	Freestyle −57 kg	Aquino (GUM); W 5–0^{VT}	Nichita (MDA); L 0–5^{VT}	—N/a	Paruszewski (GER); W 3–0^{PO}	Hong (CHN); L 0–4^{ST}	5

== See also ==
- Brazil at the 2023 Pan American Games
- Brazil at the 2024 Summer Paralympics
