= Boxing at the 2024 Summer Olympics – Women's 57 kg =

Women's 57 kg at the Games of the XXXIII Olympiad
- Boxing pictogram
- Venue: Arena Paris Nord (preliminary); Stade Roland Garros (semifinals and finals)
- Dates: 30 July – 10 August 2024
- Competitors: 22 from 22 nations

Medalists
1st place, gold medalist(s)		Lin Yu-ting	Chinese Taipei
2nd place, silver medalist(s)		Julia Szeremeta	Poland
3rd place, bronze medalist(s)		Esra Yıldız	Turkey
3rd place, bronze medalist(s)		Nesthy Petecio	Philippines

The women's 57 kg (featherweight) boxing event at the 2024 Summer Olympics took place between 30 July and 10 August 2024. Preliminary boxing matches occurred at Arena Paris Nord in Villepinte, with the medal rounds (semifinals and finals) staged at Stade Roland Garros.

== Background ==
The 2020 champion Sena Irie retired in May 2023.

== Qualification ==
Each NOC could send one boxer to the event.

== Competition format ==
Like all Olympic boxing events, the competition was a straight single-elimination tournament. The competition began with a preliminary round, where the number of competitors was reduced to 16, and concluded with a final. As there were fewer than 32 boxers in the competition, a number of boxers received a bye through the preliminary round. Both semi-final losers were awarded bronze medals.

Bouts consisted of three three-minute rounds with a one-minute break between rounds. A boxer may win by knockout or by points. Scoring was on the "10-point-must," with five judges scoring each round. Judges consider "number of blows landed on the target areas, domination of the bout, technique and tactical superiority and competitiveness." Each judge determined a winner for each round, who received 10 points for the round, and assigned the round's loser a number of points between seven and nine based on performance. The judge's scores for each round were added to give a total score for that judge. The boxer with the higher score from a majority of the judges was the winner.

== Schedule ==
The schedule was as follows.

Legend

R32	Round of 32	R16	Round of 16	QF	Quarter-Finals	SF	Semi-Finals	F	Final

Jul 30	Jul 31	Aug 1	Aug 2	Aug 3	Aug 4	Aug 5	Aug 6	Aug 7	Aug 8	Aug 9	Aug 10
R32			R16		QF			SF			F

== Draw ==
The draw was held on 25 July 2024.

== Seeds ==
The seeds were released on 25 July 2024.

1. Lin Yu-ting (TPE) (champion)
2. Tina Rahimi (AUS) (round of 16)
3. Amina Zidani (FRA) (round of 16)
4. Jucielen Romeu (BRA) (quarterfinals)
5. Khouloud Hlimi (TUN) (round of 16)
6. Valeria Arboleda (COL) (round of 16)
7. Karina Ibragimova (KAZ) (round of 16)
8. Svetlana Staneva (BUL) (quarterfinals)

== Results ==
=== Finals ===
Final
10 August
Lin Yu-ting (TPE)	5
Julia Szeremeta (POL)	0

=== Top half ===
Round of 32
30 July
Marcelat Sakobi Matshu (COD)	2
Sitora Turdibekova (UZB)	3
30 July
Esra Yıldız (TUR)	5
Marine Camara (MLI)	0
30 July
Alyssa Mendoza (USA)	3
Mijgona Samadova (TJK)	2

Round of 16
2 August
Lin Yu-ting (TPE)	5
Sitora Turdibekova (UZB)	0
2 August
Michaela Walsh (IRL)	0
Svetlana Staneva (BUL)	5
2 August
Khouloud Hlimi (TUN)	0
Esra Yıldız (TUR)	5
2 August
Alyssa Mendoza (USA)	1
Jucielen Romeu (BRA)	4

Quarterfinals
4 August
Lin Yu-ting (TPE)	5
Svetlana Staneva (BUL)	0
4 August
Esra Yıldız (TUR)	4
Jucielen Romeu (BRA)	1

Semifinals
7 August
Lin Yu-ting (TPE)	5
Esra Yıldız (TUR)	0

=== Bottom half ===
Round of 32
30 July
Jaismine Lamboria (IND)	0
Nesthy Petecio (PHI)	5
30 July
Xu Zichun (CHN)	3
Irma Testa (ITA)	2
30 July
Omailyn Alcalá (VEN)	1
Julia Szeremeta (POL)	4

Round of 16
2 August
Amina Zidani (FRA)	1
Nesthy Petecio (PHI)	4
2 August
Xu Zichun (CHN)	3
Valeria Arboleda (COL)	2
2 August
Karina Ibragimova (KAZ)	0
Ashleyann Lozada (PUR)	5
2 August
Julia Szeremeta (POL)	5
Tina Rahimi (AUS)	0

Quarterfinals
4 August
Nesthy Petecio (PHI)	5
Xu Zichun (CHN)	0
4 August
Ashleyann Lozada (PUR)	0
Julia Szeremeta (POL)	5

Semifinals
7 August
Nesthy Petecio (PHI)	1
Julia Szeremeta (POL)	4
