= Boxing at the 2023 Pan American Games – Women's 57 kg =

Women's 57 kg at the 2023 Pan American Games
- Venue: Olympic Training Center
- Start date: October 23, 2023
- End date: October 27, 2023
- Competitors: 14 from 14 nations

Medalists
Gold medal	Jucielen Romeu	Brazil
Silver medal	Valeria Arboleda	Colombia
Bronze medal	Omailyn Alcalá	Venezuela
Bronze medal	Ashleyann Lozada	Puerto Rico

The Women's 57 kg competition of the boxing events at the 2023 Pan American Games in Santiago, Chile, was held between October 23 and 27 at the Olympic Training Center. A total of 14 boxers from 14 NOC's competed.

The four semifinalists will qualify for the 2024 Summer Olympics in Paris, France.

== Qualification ==
There was a quota of 130 boxers to compete at the games (ten per event). The host nation (Chile) received automatic qualification spots for all events. The remainder of the spots were awarded through various qualifying tournaments. However, the International Olympic Committee later decided the competition was an open registration event, meaning any NOC could enter a boxer into the event.

== Competition format ==
Like all Pan American boxing events, the competition is a straight single-elimination tournament. Both semifinal losers are awarded bronze medals, so no boxers compete again after their first loss. Bouts consist of 3 rounds "10-point must" scoring system used, where the winner of each round must be awarded 10 points and the loser a lesser amount, and the elimination of the padded headgear. Five judges scored each bout. The winner will be the boxer who scored the most at the end of the match.

== Results ==
Round of 16
Miguelina Hernández (DOM)	0
Valeria Arboleda (COL)	5
Ashleyann Lozada (PUR)	5
Minerva Montiel (PAR)	0
Marie Al-Ahmadieh (CAN)	3
Alyssa Mendoza (USA)	2
Omailyn Alcalá (VEN)	4
Leilany Reyes (EAI)	1
Jennifer Carrillo (MEX)	1
Legnis Calá (CUB)	4
Jucielen Romeu (BRA)	5
Milagros Herrera (ARG)	0

Quarterfinals
Tamara Maturana (CHI)	0
Valeria Arboleda (COL)	5
Ashleyann Lozada (PUR)	5
Marie Al-Ahmadieh (CAN)	0
Omailyn Alcalá (VEN)	5
Legnis Calá (CUB)	0
Jucielen Romeu (BRA)	5
Daisy Bamberger (PER)	0

Semifinals
Valeria Arboleda (COL)	3
Ashleyann Lozada (PUR)	2
Omailyn Alcalá (VEN)	1
Jucielen Romeu (BRA)	4

Final
Valeria Arboleda (COL)	0
Jucielen Romeu (BRA)	5
