= 2025 World Boxing Championships – Women's 57 kg =

Competition at amateur boxing tournament

Women's 57 kg at the 2025 World Boxing Championships
- Venue: Liverpool Arena
- Location: Liverpool, England
- Dates: 5–13 September
- Competitors: 29 from 29 nations

Medalists
gold medal	Jaismine Lamboria	India
silver medal	Julia Szeremeta	Poland
bronze medal	Valeria Arboleda	Colombia
bronze medal	Omailyn Alcalá	Venezuela

The Women's 57 kg competition at the 2025 World Boxing Championships was held from 5 to 13 September 2025.

== Results ==
=== Final ===
Final; 13 September
Julia Szeremeta (POL)	1
Jaismine Lamboria (IND)	4

=== Top half ===
Preliminaries; 5 September
Satsuki Yoshizawa (JPN)	0
Cai Yan (CHN)	5
Bibiana Lovašová (SVK)	1
Elise Glynn (ENG)	4
Karina Ibragimova (KAZ)	5
Panagiota Kouzilou (GRE)	0
Alyssa Mendoza (USA)	0
Valeria Arboleda (COL)	5
Julie Ramadan (AUS)	1
Möngöntsetsegiin Enkhjargal (MGL)	4
Szabina Szűcs (HUN)	1
Jenifer Fernández (ESP)	4
Aynur Mikayilova (AZE)	0
Gabriella Weerheim (NED)	5

Round of 16; 7 September
Julia Szeremeta (POL)	5
Cai Yan (CHN)	0
Elise Glynn (ENG)	0
Karina Ibragimova (KAZ)	5
Valeria Arboleda (COL)	4
Möngöntsetsegiin Enkhjargal (MGL)	1
Jenifer Fernández (ESP)	0
Gabriella Weerheim (NED)	5

Quarter-finals; 10 September
Julia Szeremeta (POL)	3
Karina Ibragimova (KAZ)	2
Valeria Arboleda (COL)	5
Gabriella Weerheim (NED)	0

Semi-finals; 12 September
Julia Szeremeta (POL)	3
Valeria Arboleda (COL)	2

=== Bottom half ===
Preliminaries; 5 September
Marie Al-Ahmadieh (CAN)	0
Omailyn Alcalá (VEN)	5
Michaela Walsh (IRL)	RSC
Hadeel Ashour (KSA)
Wu Shih-yi (TPE)	5
Nikolina Ćaćić (CRO)	0
Paloma Pérez (MEX)	0
Bojana Gojković (MNE)	5
Ali Lai-Carlyle (NZL)	0
Khumoranobu Mamajonova (UZB)	5
Jaismine Lamboria (IND)	5
Daria-Olha Hutarina (UKR)	0

Round of 16; 7 September
Esra Yıldız (TUR)	2
Omailyn Alcalá (VEN)	3
Michaela Walsh (IRL)	1
Wu Shih-yi (TPE)	4
Bojana Gojković (MNE)	0
Khumoranobu Mamajonova (UZB)	5
Jaismine Lamboria (IND)	5
Jucielen Romeu (BRA)	0

Quarter-finals; 10 September
Omailyn Alcalá (VEN)	3
Wu Shih-yi (TPE)	2
Khumoranobu Mamajonova (UZB)	0
Jaismine Lamboria (IND)	5

Semi-finals; 12 September
Omailyn Alcalá (VEN)	0
Jaismine Lamboria (IND)	5
