= 2022 IBA Women's World Boxing Championships – Welterweight =

Women's Boxing Event

Welterweight at the 2022 IBA Women's World Boxing Championships
- Venue: Başakşehir Youth and Sports Facility
- Location: Istanbul, Turkey
- Dates: 12–20 May
- Competitors: 28 from 28 nations

Medalists
gold medal	Busenaz Sürmeneli	Turkey
silver medal	Charlie Cavanagh	Canada
bronze medal	Ichrak Chaib	Algeria
bronze medal	Janjaem Suwannapheng	Thailand

The Welterweight competition at the 2022 IBA Women's World Boxing Championships was held from 12 to 20 May 2022.

== Results ==
=== Finals ===
Semi-finals
(Canada) Charlie Cavanagh	3
(Algeria) Ichrak Chaib	2
(Turkey) Busenaz Sürmeneli	5
(Thailand) Janjaem Suwannapheng	0

Final
(Canada) Charlie Cavanagh
(Turkey) Busenaz Sürmeneli	RSC

=== Top half ===
==== Section 1 ====
Round of 32
(Morocco) Oumaïma Belahbib
(Cape Verde) Ivanusa Moreira	RSC-I
(Canada) Charlie Cavanagh	3
(Wales) Rosie Eccles	2
(Serbia) Milena Matović	2
(Puerto Rico) Stephanie Piñeiro	3

Round of 16
(Kenya) Everline Akinyi	0
(Cape Verde) Ivanusa Moreira	5
(Canada) Charlie Cavanagh	3
(Puerto Rico) Stephanie Piñeiro	2

Quarterfinals
(Cape Verde) Ivanusa Moreira	0
(Canada) Charlie Cavanagh	5

==== Section 2 ====
Round of 32
(Venezuela) Ninoska Pérez
(Algeria) Ichrak Chaib	RSC
(South Africa) Siphosethu Daweti
(South Korea) Choi Hong-eun	w/o
(Slovenia) Tanja Ovsenik	0
(Poland) Aneta Rygielska	5

Round of 16
(Algeria) Ichrak Chaib	5
(South Korea) Choi Hong-eun	0
(Poland) Aneta Rygielska	5
(India) Ankushita Boro	0

Quarterfinals
(Algeria) Ichrak Chaib	3
(Poland) Aneta Rygielska	2

=== Bottom half ===
==== Section 3 ====
Round of 32
(Turkey) Busenaz Sürmeneli	RSC-I
(Italy) Angela Carini
(Australia) Jelena Prziovska-Strachan	0
(Hungary) Luca Hámori	5
(Uzbekistan) Navbakhor Khamidova	3
(Kazakhstan) Dariga Shakimova	2

Round of 16
(United States) Arika Skoog
(Turkey) Busenaz Sürmeneli	ABD
(Hungary) Luca Hámori	1
(Uzbekistan) Navbakhor Khamidova	4

Quarterfinals
(Turkey) Busenaz Sürmeneli	RSC
(Uzbekistan) Navbakhor Khamidova

==== Section 4 ====
Round of 32
(Germany) Stefanie von Berge	0
(Argentina) Lucía Pérez	5
(Thailand) Janjaem Suwannapheng	5
(Chinese Taipei) Su Ching-wen	0
(Lithuania) Austėja Aučiūtė	1
(Republic of Ireland) Kaci Rock	4

Round of 16
(Argentina) Lucía Pérez	0
(Thailand) Janjaem Suwannapheng	5
(Republic of Ireland) Kaci Rock	0
(Ukraine) Anna Lysenko	5

Quarterfinals
(Thailand) Janjaem Suwannapheng	5
(Ukraine) Anna Lysenko	0
