= Boxing at the 2026 Central American and Caribbean Games =

- Venue: Centro Olímpico Juan Pablo Duarte
- Location: Santo Domingo, Dominican Republic
- Dates: 1–7 August

The boxing competition at the 2026 Central American and Caribbean Games was held in Santo Domingo, Dominican Republic, from 1 to 7 August 2026 at the Centro Olímpico Juan Pablo Duarte.

== Participating nations ==
A total of 21 nations qualified athletes. The number of athletes a nation entered is in parentheses beside the name of the country.

- Bahamas (1)
- Barbados (6)
- Colombia (12)
- Cuba (12)
- Dominica (2)
- Dominican Republic (12)
- El Salvador (2)
- Guatemala (9)
- Guyana (3)
- Haiti (7)
- Honduras (4)
- Jamaica (2)
- Mexico (13)
- Nicaragua (6)
- Panama (5)
- Puerto Rico (11)
- Saint Lucia (3)
- Suriname (1)
- Trinidad and Tobago (3)
- Venezuela (12)
- Virgin Islands (5)

== Medal table ==
* Host nation (Dominican Republic)

Rank	Nation	Gold	Silver	Bronze	Total
1	Dominican Republic (DOM)*	7	0	1	8
2	Venezuela (VEN)	3	4	3	10
3	Mexico (MEX)	1	6	2	9
4	Cuba (CUB)	1	3	6	10
5	Colombia (COL)	1	0	4	5
6	Guatemala (GUA)	1	0	2	3
7	Puerto Rico (PUR)	0	1	3	4
8	Haiti (HAI)	0	0	2	2
8	U.S. Virgin Islands (ISV)	0	0	2	2
10	Barbados (BAR)	0	0	1	1
10	Suriname (SUR)	0	0	1	1
10	Trinidad and Tobago (TTO)	0	0	1	1
Totals (12 entries)		14	14	28	56

== Medal summary ==
=== Men's events ===
Event	Gold	Silver	Bronze
55 kg	Junior Alcántara; Dominican Republic	Alejandro Claro; Cuba	Jabali Breedy; Barbados
55 kg	Junior Alcántara; Dominican Republic	Alejandro Claro; Cuba	José Felipe; Guatemala
60 kg	Disney Medina; Dominican Republic	Wilson Solorzano; Venezuela	Abdul Taylor; Trinidad and Tobago
60 kg	Disney Medina; Dominican Republic	Wilson Solorzano; Venezuela	Brandol Pérez; Guatemala
65 kg	Miguel Encarnación; Dominican Republic	Hugo Barrón; Mexico	Domelzo Schet; Suriname
65 kg	Miguel Encarnación; Dominican Republic	Hugo Barrón; Mexico	Juliam Ortiz; Puerto Rico
70 kg	Ricardo Cuello; Dominican Republic	Yusnier Sorsano; Cuba	Ángel Llanos; Puerto Rico
70 kg	Ricardo Cuello; Dominican Republic	Yusnier Sorsano; Cuba	Abel Álvarez; Mexico
80 kg	Noel Pacheco; Dominican Republic	Diego Pereyra; Venezuela	Keylor García; Cuba
80 kg	Noel Pacheco; Dominican Republic	Diego Pereyra; Venezuela	Cedrick Belony-Duliepre; Haiti
90 kg	Cristian Pinales; Dominican Republic	Julio César La Cruz; Cuba	Alfonso Blanco; Venezuela
90 kg	Cristian Pinales; Dominican Republic	Julio César La Cruz; Cuba	Jhojan Caicedo; Colombia
+90 kg	Juan Pablo Patiño; Colombia	Javier Cruz; Mexico	Ke Ion Gabriel; U.S. Virgin Islands
+90 kg	Juan Pablo Patiño; Colombia	Javier Cruz; Mexico	Fernando Arzola; Cuba

=== Women's events ===
Event	Gold	Silver	Bronze
51 kg	Valeria Amparán; Mexico	Irismar Cardozo; Venezuela	Saintelise Jean; Haiti
51 kg	Valeria Amparán; Mexico	Irismar Cardozo; Venezuela	Dinaybi de las Nieves; Cuba
54 kg	Estefani Almánzar; Dominican Republic	Diana Marstre; Venezuela	Ariadna Gil; Mexico
54 kg	Estefani Almánzar; Dominican Republic	Diana Marstre; Venezuela	Carisney García; Cuba
57 kg	Omailyn Alcalá; Venezuela	Guadalupe Torres; Mexico	Coralis Cruz; Puerto Rico
57 kg	Omailyn Alcalá; Venezuela	Guadalupe Torres; Mexico	Magda Massó; Cuba
60 kg	Krisandy Ríos; Venezuela	Paula Hernández; Mexico	Camila Camilo; Colombia
60 kg	Krisandy Ríos; Venezuela	Paula Hernández; Mexico	Katherine Bera; Dominican Republic
65 kg	María Chiroy; Guatemala	Darianne Hernández; Mexico	Youly Mena; Venezuela
65 kg	María Chiroy; Guatemala	Darianne Hernández; Mexico	Cindy Claudio; U.S. Virgin Islands
70 kg	Dayira Mesa; Cuba	Stephanie Piñeiro; Puerto Rico	Shirleidis Orozco; Colombia
70 kg	Dayira Mesa; Cuba	Stephanie Piñeiro; Puerto Rico	Génesis Palma; Venezuela
75 kg	Maryelis Yriza; Venezuela	Lorien Alonso; Mexico	Yoana Rodríguez; Cuba
75 kg	Maryelis Yriza; Venezuela	Lorien Alonso; Mexico	Angie Solano; Colombia
