= Irismar Cardozo =

Venezuelan boxer (born 1998)

Personal information
- Nationality: Venezuelan
- Born: 2 April 1998 (age 28)

Sport
- Sport: Boxing
Medal record
Representing Venezuela
Pan American Games
| Bronze medal – third place | 2019 Lima | Flyweight |
Central American and Caribbean Games
| Silver medal – second place | 2026 Santo Domingo | Flyweight |

Irismar Del Valle Cardozo Rojas (born 2 April 1998) is a Venezuelan boxer. She competed in the women's flyweight event at the 2020 Summer Olympics.
