= Omailyn Alcalá =

Venezuelan boxer (born 1998)

Personal information
- Nationality: (Venezuela) Venezuelan
- Born: 9 September 1998 (age 27)

Sport
- Sport: Boxing
- Weight class: Featherweight
Medal record
Women's amateur boxing
Representing Venezuela
World Championships
Bronze medal – third place	2025 Liverpool	57 kg
Pan American Games
Bronze medal – third place	2023 Santiago	57 kg
Central American and Caribbean Games
Gold medal – first place	2026 Santo Domingo	Featherweight
Bolivarian Games
Gold medal – first place	2025 Lima-Ayacucho	57 kg

Omailyn Alcalá (born 9 September 1998) is a Venezuelan boxer.

== Career ==
Competing in the 57 kg division, she won bronze medals at the 2025 World Boxing Championships and the 2023 Pan American Games. Alcalá also represented her country at the 2024 Summer Olympics.
