= Valeria Arboleda =

Columbian boxer (born 2002)

Personal information
- Nationality: (Colombia) Colombian
- Born: 13 April 2002 (age 24)

Sport
- Sport: Boxing
- Weight class: Featherweight
Medal record
Women's amateur boxing
Representing Colombia
World Championships
Bronze medal – third place	2025 Liverpool	57 kg
Pan American Games
Silver medal – second place	2023 Santiago	57 kg
Bolivarian Games
Bronze medal – third place	2025 Lima-Ayacucho	60 kg

Valeria Arboleda (born 13 April 2002) is a Colombian boxer. Competing in the 57kg division, she won a bronze medal at the 2025 World Boxing Championships and a silver medal at the 2023 Pan American Games. Arboleda also represented her country at the 2024 Summer Olympics.
