= Tina Rahimi =

Australian boxer (born 1996)

Personal information
- Nationality: Australian, Iranian
- Born: 13 March 1996 (age 30) Westmead, New South Wales, Australia
- Height: 166 cm (5 ft 5 in)

Boxing career
Medal record
Women's amateur boxing
Representing Australia
Commonwealth Games
Bronze medal – third place	2022 Birmingham	Featherweight
Pacific Games
Gold medal – first place	2023 Honiara	Featherweight

Tina Rahimi (Persian: تینا رحیمی, born 13 March 1996) is an Australian boxer of Iranian origin. She participated in the 2022 Commonwealth Games and won bronze medal in the Women's Featherweight Division. She is one of the first Australian Muslim women boxers, and the first to compete in the Olympics, at the 2024 Summer Olympics in Paris, France. She lives in Bankstown.

== Results ==
- Boxing at the 2024 Summer Olympics – Women's 57 kg

== See also ==
- Iranian Australians
