= Jaismine Lamboria =

Indian boxer (born 2001)

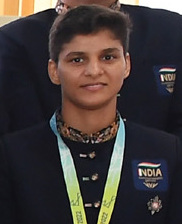

Personal information
- Born: 30 August 2001 (age 25) Bhiwani district, Haryana, India
- Height: 1.74 m (5 ft 9 in)
- Military career
- Branch: Indian Army
- Service years: 2022-
- Rank: Naib Subedar
- Unit: Corps of Military Police

Sport
- Sport: Boxing
- Weight class: Featherweight
Medal record
Women's boxing
Representing India
Event	1st	2nd	3rd
World Championships	1	0	0
World Boxing Cup	2	0	0
Commonwealth Games	1	0	1
Asian Championships	0	0	1
Total	4	0	2
World Championships
Gold medal – first place	2025 Liverpool	57 kg
World Boxing Cup
Gold medal – first place	2025 Astana	57 kg
Gold medal – first place	2025 New Delhi	57 kg
Commonwealth Games
Gold medal – first place	2026 Glasgow	57 kg
Bronze medal – third place	2022 Birmingham	Lightweight
Asian Championships
Bronze medal – third place	2021 Dubai	Featherweight
Asian Elite Championships
Silver medal – second place	2026 Ulaanbaatar	57 kg

Jaismine Lamboria (born 30 August 2001) is an Indian boxer. She is a Naib Subedar in the Indian Army. She represented India in the women's 57 kg event at the 2024 Summer Olympics. She won gold medals at the 2025 World Boxing Championships and the 2025 World Boxing Cup in the 57 kg category. She won the gold medal in the 57 kg category at the 2026 Commonwealth Games and the bronze medal in the lightweight category at the 2022 Commonwealth Games.

== Early life ==
Jaismine Lamboria was born on 30 August 2001 in Bhiwani of Haryana. Her late great-grandfather Hawa Singh was an accomplished boxer, winning gold medals in the heavyweight category at the 1966 and the 1970 Asian Games. Her grandfather Chander Bhan Lamboriya was a wrestler. She was initially trained in boxing by her uncles Sandeep Singh and Parvinder Singh, who were also boxers. In 2022, she became the first woman boxer to join the Indian Army. She joined as a havildar in the Corps of Military Police, and was later promoted to Naib Subedar.

== Career ==
Lamboria won the bronze medal in the 57 kg category in the 2021 Asian Amateur Boxing Championships in Dubai. In the 2022 Commonwealth Games, she won the bronze medal in the lightweight category. She represented India in the women's 57 kg event at the 2024 Summer Olympics.

In the 2025 World Boxing Cup, Lamboria won the gold medal in the 57 kg category in the second stage in Astana, and in the finals in New Delhi. In the 2025 World Boxing Championships held in Liverpool in September 2025, she won the gold medal in the 57 kg category. In the quarter-finals of the women's 57 kg event at the 2026 Commonwealth Games in Glasgow, she defeated England's Elise Glynnto advance to the semi-finals. In the semi-finals, she defeated Rapelang Masalele of Lesotho to progress to the finals. In the finals, she defeated Michaela Walsh of Northern Ireland by a unanimous decision to win the gold medal.

At the Commonwealth Games 2026 in Glasgow, Lamboria — the reigning world champion and world number 1, won gold in the women's 57 kg category, defeating Northern Ireland's Michaela Walsh by a unanimous 5-0 decision, upgrading the bronze she had won at Birmingham 2022
