= Charlie Cavanagh =

Canadian boxer (born 2000)

Personal information
- Born: 15 June 2000 (age 26) Saint John, New Brunswick, Canada
- Height: 175 cm (5 ft 9 in)
- Weight: 66 kg (146 lb)

Boxing career
- Sport: Amateur boxing
- Weight class: Welterweight
- Retired: 2024
Medal record
Women's amateur boxing
Representing Canada
World Championships
Silver medal – second place	2022 Istanbul	Welterweight
Pan American Games
Bronze medal – third place	2023 Santiago	Welterweight
Pan American Championships
Bronze medal – third place	2022 Guayaquil	Welterweight
Youth World Championships
Gold medal – first place	2018 Budapest	Welterweight

Charlie Cavanagh (born 15 June 2000) is a Canadian former amateur boxer who won a silver medal at the 2022 World Championships. She retired in 2024.

== Career ==
=== Youth ===
Cavanagh started her national team career in 2018, by winning gold at the 2018 Youth World Championships in Budapest, Hungary. Cavanagh therefore became the first ever Canadian youth world champion.

=== Senior ===
After not competing since 2019, Cavanagh was named to Canada's 2022 Pan American Championships team just days before the event. Cavanagh would go on to lose in the semifinals to Brazil's Beatriz Soares in a unanimous decision. However, Cavanagh would win the bronze medal and qualify for the 2022 IBA Women's World Boxing Championships.

At the 2022 IBA Women's World Boxing Championships, Cavanagh qualified to compete in the gold medal match and guarantee herself at least a silver medal. Cavanagh would go on to win the silver medal, losing to Turkey's Busenaz Sürmeneli after the referee stopped the contest.

On March 4, 2024, Cavanagh announced her retirement from boxing on social media, citing her growing unhappiness in the sport as well as struggles with eating disorders as reasons for her retirement.
