= Morelle McCane =

American boxer (born 1995)

Personal information
- Nationality: American
- Born: January 30, 1995 (age 31) Cleveland, Ohio, U.S.

Boxing career
Medal record
Women's amateur boxing
Representing United States
Pan American Games
Silver medal – second place	2023 Santiago	Women's 66 kg

Morelle McCane (born January 30, 1995) is an American boxer. She won the silver medal at the 2023 Pan American Games in Boxing in the Women's 66 kg category, and later competed at the 2024 Summer Olympics.
