= Bárbara Maria dos Santos =

Brazilian boxer (born 1990)

Personal information
- Born: 4 December 1990 (age 35) São Paulo, Brazil
- Height: 1.73 m (5 ft 8 in)

Boxing career
- Weight class: Welterweight
- Stance: Southpaw
Medal record
Women's amateur boxing
Representing Brazil
Pan American Games
Gold medal – first place	2023 Santiago	Women's 66 kg

Bárbara Maria dos Santos (born 4 December 1990) is a Brazilian amateur boxer. She won a gold medal at the 2023 Pan American Games in the women's 66 kg category.
