= Ashleyann Lozada =

Puerto Rican boxer (born 1991)

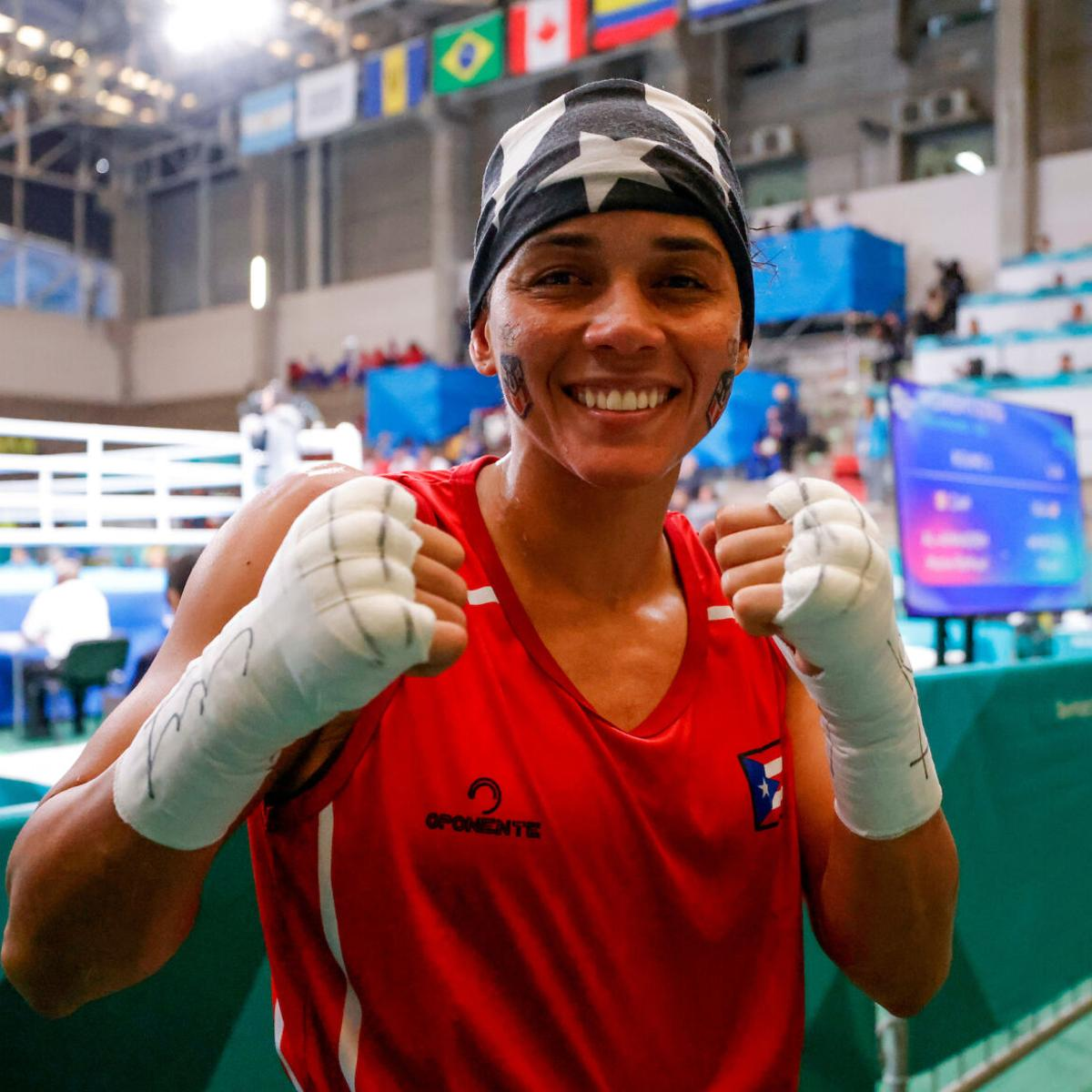
- Lozada at 2023 Pan American Games

Personal information
- Born: 1991 (age 34–35) Corozal, Puerto Rico

Sport
- Sport: Boxing
Medal record
Representing Puerto Rico
Pan American Games
Bronze medal – third place	2023 Santiago	Featherweight
Central American and Caribbean Games
Gold medal – first place	2018 Barranquilla	Bantamweight
Gold medal – first place	2023 San Salvador	Bantamweight

Ashleyann Lozada Motta (born 1991) is a Puerto Rican female boxer. She is a native of Corozal. She has competed at the featherweight division as an amateur, and has won several medals.

She is the first female boxer in Puerto Rico's history to qualify for an Olympic Games, in her case, the 2024 Olympic Games in Paris, France as a featherweight in the women's competition, to which she qualified by clinching a bronze medal at the 2023 Pan American Games. She stands alone as the sole athlete, male or female, from Puerto Rico to achieve consecutive gold medal victories at the 2018 Central American and Caribbean Games and 2023 Central American and Caribbean Games .

== Career ==
Lozada debuted with a fight in Guayaquil, Ecuador, on October 7, 2009, in a card headlined by a Marlen Esparza bout. That night, Lozada defeated Elizabeth Leddy by a four-rounds decision. She experienced an eight-years hiatus before returning to a boxing ring as a competitor. On 13 June 2017, Lozada fought Sabrina Aubin in Tegucigalpa, Honduras. Lozada lost a three-rounds majority decision to the experienced Aubin, a 32-contest veteran. The fight was part of the 2017 AMBC American (amateur) Boxing Continental Championships. She won a gold medal in the 57 kg division at the 2018 Central American and Caribbean Games held in Colombia.

At the 2022 IBA Women's World Championships held in Istanbul, Turkey, Lozada was defeated by Svetlana Kamenova by three-rounds split decision in a preliminary-round contest. She participated at the 2023 IBA Women's World Championships, held in New Delhi, India. She won one fight on March 19 against Zichun Xu, to advance to the contest's round of 16 by a three-rounds split decision, but then lost to Amina Zidani by a three-rounds split decision also, at the K.D. Jadhav Indoor Hall on March 21, to drop out of the competition.

Late in 2023, she represented Puerto Rico in Santiago, Chile, at the 2023 Pan American Games' featherweight women's boxing competition, where she made history by securing a spot at the 2024 France Olympic Games and becoming the first Puerto Rican woman to secure an Olympic spot in boxing, by beating Mariebathoul Al-Ahmadieh. In the semi-finals of the competition, she lost by a three-rounds split decision to Valeria Arboleda of Colombia, leaving with a bronze medal.

In amateur boxing, Lozada has won 28 out of her 38 contests, with 2 wins and 0 losses by knockout. She is also a two-time defending Central American and Caribbean games champion, having won the Featherweight women's championship at the Barranquilla Games in 2018 and at the San Salvador Games in 2023.

Lozada is trained by Carlos Espada, a former professional boxer and brother of former WBA world welterweight champion Angel Espada.

On 2 August 2024, she began her participation at the 2024 Summer Olympics by defeating Karina Ibragimova of Kazakhstan by unanimous decision to advance to the Game's second round of the women's featherweight competition. On 4 August, Lozada finished her participation in the Olympics by losing in the quarterfinals to Julia Szeremeta by three-rounds unanimous decision.

On November 12, 2024, Ashleyann Lozada, signed a multi-year promotional agreement with Salita Promotions and Mark Taffet Media LLC. Lozada’s signing with these promotions marks a significant step in her career following her achievements as an amateur boxer.

Ashleyann Lozada made her professional boxing debut on February 2, 2025, at the Dort Financial Center in Flint, Michigan, on the undercard of Claressa vs Perkins fight. Competing in the 122-pound weight class, she faced Denise Moran, who entered the bout with a 3-0 professional record. Lozada won the fight by unanimous decision.

== Personal life ==
Ashleyann Lozada never dreamed of becoming a boxer. She only took up boxing after her mother encouraged her to channel her frequent fights with classmates into the sport. Her peers had nicknamed her "The Boxer" after noticing her fighting stance, which she attributes to being influenced by watching Miguel Cotto's fights.

Growing up in a rural area of Puerto Rico, Ashley and her mother faced difficulties accessing training facilities in the city. Initially, they trained in their yard with her older brother and then moved to the local park. This caught the attention of Roberto Hernandez, the Mayor of Corozal at the time, who helped a family neighbor named Albert open a small gym near a school, welcoming any child interested in learning boxing.

When Albert left the gym for unknown reasons, Ashley's mother took over running it until she could no longer continue due to licensing issues. Determined to support Ashley's boxing career, they began traveling to a gym in Corozal that was being managed at the time by head coach Ervin Gonzales, often walking or hitchhiking to get there.

Ashley trained at the Corozal gym until 2011, when she took a hiatus, not because she lost interest, but due to financial constraints. During this break, she worked at a local bakery and dedicated three of those six years to studying criminal justice. Her decision to stop boxing led to frequent disagreements with her mother, ultimately prompting Ashley to return to the sport.

== See also ==
- List of Puerto Ricans
