= Stephanie Piñeiro =

Puerto Rican boxer (born 1984)

Personal information
- Nicknames: La Medicina ("The Medicine")
- Born: Stephanie Piñeiro Aquino; July 18, 1990 (age 36) Bayamón, Puerto Rico
- Height: 5 ft 9 in (175 cm)
- Weight: Welterweight, Super-lightweight

Boxing career
- Stance: Southpaw

Boxing record
- Total fights: 10
- Wins: 10
- Win by KO: 3
- Losses: 1
Medal record
Women's Amateur boxing
Representing Puerto Rico
Central American and Caribbean Games
Bronze medal – third place	2018 Barranquilla	Light welterweight
Gold medal – first place	2023 San Salvador	Welterweight

Stephanie Piñeiro Aquino (born July 18, 1990) is a Puerto Rican professional boxer. She held the interim WBA female welterweight title from September 2025 until April 2026.

== Professional career ==
=== Piñeiro vs. Houle ===
Piñeiro turned professional in 2019. She compiled a record of 7–0 before facing Marie Pier Houle for the vacant interim WBA female welterweight title at Coliseo Rubén Rodríguez in Bayamón, Puerto Rico, on September 12, 2025, winning via third round stoppage.

=== Piñeiro vs. Sánchez ===
At the same venue at which she won the interim title, Piñeiro successfully defended it against former three-weight world champion, Anahí Ester Sánchez, with a unanimous decision victory on November 22, 2025.

=== Piñeiro vs. Price ===
Piñeiro challenged unified WBC, IBF, WBA and The Ring female welterweight champion Lauren Price at Cardiff International Arena in Cardiff, Wales on April 4, 2026. Piñeiro lost the 10-round title bout by unanimous decision.

=== Piñeiro vs. Vázquez ===
Piñeiro is scheduled to face undefeated Litzy Vázquez for the vacant WBC and WBA female super-lightweight titles at Coliseo Rubén Rodríguez in Bayamón, Puerto Rico, on December 5, 2026.

== Professional boxing record ==
11 fights	10 wins	1 loss
By knockout	3	0
By decision	7	1

No.	Result	Record	Opponent	Type	Round, time	Date	Location	Notes
11	Loss	10–1	Lauren Price	UD	10	Apr 4, 2026	Cardiff International Arena, Cardiff, Wales	For WBA, WBC, IBF and The Ring female welterweight titles
10	Win	10–0	Anahí Ester Sánchez	UD	10	Nov 22, 2025	Coliseo Rubén Rodríguez, Bayamón, Puerto Rico	Retained Interim WBA welterweight title
9	Win	9–0	Marie Pier Houle	TKO	2 (10), 0:40	Sep 12, 2025	Coliseo Rubén Rodríguez, Bayamón, Puerto Rico	Won interim WBA female welterweight title
8	Win	8–0	Kalindra Faria	UD	8	Dec 7, 2024	Roberto Clemente Coliseum, San Juan, Puerto Rico	
7	Win	7–0	Diana Tapia Castro	UD	10	Jun 15, 2024	Coliseo Juan Aubin Cruz Abreu, Manatí, Puerto Rico	Won vacant WBA Continental America female welterweight title
6	Win	6–0	Simone Aparecida da Silva	UD	6	Dec 2, 2023	Coliseo Rubén Rodríguez, Bayamón, Puerto Rico	
5	Win	5–0	Miranda Barber	UD	6	Sep 2, 2023	Mario Morales Coliseum, Guaynabo, Puerto Rico	
4	Win	4–0	Yamila Reynoso	UD	6	Feb 11, 2023	Coliseo Rubén Rodríguez, Bayamón, Puerto Rico	
3	Win	3–0	Deseree Jamison	TKO	1 (6), 0:54	Dec 3, 2022	Mario Morales Coliseum, Guaynabo, Puerto Rico	
2	Win	2–0	Andrea Wright	TKO	1 (6), 0:15	Jan 25, 2020	Palacio de Recreación y Deportes, Mayagüez, Puerto Rico	
1	Win	1–0	Annette Pabello	UD	6	Sep 14, 2019	Cancha Juanito Cabello, Cidra, Puerto Rico	

== See also ==
- List of female boxers
- List of southpaw stance boxers

Sporting positions
Regional boxing titles
New title	WBA Continental America welterweight champion June 14, 2024 – 2024; Vacated	Vacant
World boxing titles
Vacant Title last held by Ivana Habazin	WBA welterweight champion Interim title September 12, 2025 – April 4, 2026; Lost challenge for full title	Vacant
