= Jucielen Romeu =

Brazilian boxer (born 1996)

Personal information
- Born: 13 April 1996 (age 30) Rio Claro, São Paulo, Brazil
- Height: 168 cm (5 ft 6 in)

Sport
- Sport: Boxing
Medal record
Women's amateur boxing
Representing Brazil
Pan American Games
Gold medal – first place	2023 Santiago	57 kg
Silver medal – second place	2019 Lima	57 kg
World Military Boxing Championships
Bronze medal – third place	2021 Moscow	57 kg
South American Games
Silver medal – second place	2026 Santa Fe	57 kg

Jucielen Cerqueira Romeu (born 13 April 1996) is a Brazilian boxer. She competed in the women's featherweight event at the 2020 Summer Olympics.
