= 2025 deaths in the United Kingdom =

List of notable UK deaths in a year

The following notable deaths of British people occurred in 2025. Names are reported under the date of death, in alphabetical order. A typical entry reports information in the following sequence:

- Name, age, citizenship at birth, nationality (in addition to British), or/and home nation, what subject was noted for, birth year, cause of death (if known), and reference.

== January ==
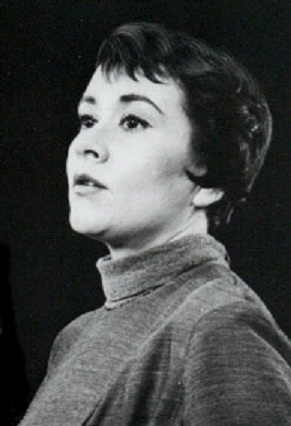
Dame Joan Plowright in 1960

- 1 January
  - David Lodge, 89, British author (Changing Places, Small World: An Academic Romance, The Picturegoers).
  - Sally Oppenheim-Barnes, Baroness Oppenheim-Barnes, 96, British politician, minister of state for consumer affairs (1979–1982), MP (1970–1987), and member of the House of Lords (1989–2019).
- 2 January – Russ North, 59, English heavy metal singer (Cloven Hoof).
- 4 January – Jenny Randerson, Baroness Randerson, 76, Welsh politician and peer, acting Deputy First Minister of Wales (2001–2002) and member of the House of Lords (since 2011).
- 5 January
  - Geoffrey Tattersall, 77, British jurist and Anglican priest.
  - The Vivienne, 32, drag performer (RuPaul's Drag Race UK, RuPaul's Drag Race All Stars, Dancing on Ice).
- 6 January
  - John Douglas, 90, Scottish rugby union player (Barbarian, British & Irish Lions, national team). (death announced on this date)
  - Meirion Roberts, 90, Welsh rugby union player (Cardiff, national team).
- 7 January
  - Barbara Clegg, 98, British actress (Emergency Ward 10) and scriptwriter (Doctor Who, Coronation Street).
  - Brian Dunsby, 84, British entrepreneur. (death announced on this date)
- 8 January
  - Geraint H. Jenkins, 78, historian. (death reported on this date)
  - Charles Kay, 94, English actor (Amadeus, Henry V, The Importance of Being Earnest).
  - Brian Usher, 80, English footballer (Sunderland, Sheffield Wednesday, Doncaster Rovers).
- 9 January – Laurie Holloway, 86, English pianist, musical director and composer.
- 10 January
  - Christopher Benjamin, 90, English actor (Doctor Who, Judge John Deed, The Plague Dogs).
  - Colin Carter, 76, British musician (Flash).
  - Thelma Hopkins, 88, Northern Irish high jumper, Olympic silver medallist (1956).
- 11 January – Bobby Kennedy, 87, Scottish football player (Manchester City, Kilmarnock) and manager (Grimsby Town).
- 12 January – Peter Brown, 83, Scottish rugby union player (Glasgow, national team).
- 13 January
  - Tony Book, 90, English football player (Bath City, Manchester City) and manager (Manchester City).
  - Elgar Howarth, 89, English conductor, composer and trumpeter.
- 14 January
  - John Blakemore, 88, English photographer.
  - Tony Slattery, 65, British actor (The Crying Game, Peter's Friends), comedian and television personality (Whose Line Is It Anyway?), heart attack.
- 15 January
  - Paul Danan, 46, English actor (Hollyoaks, Celebrity Love Island).
  - Diane Langton, 80, English actress (Hollyoaks, Only Fools and Horses, EastEnders).
  - Linda Nolan, 65, Irish singer (The Nolan Sisters), actress and television personality (Loose Women).
- 16 January – Dame Joan Plowright, 95, English actress (Enchanted April, A Taste of Honey, 101 Dalmatians), Tony winner (1961).
- 17 January – Denis Law, 84, Scottish footballer (Manchester United, Huddersfield Town, national team), Alzheimer's disease.
- 18 January
  - Garry Brooke, 64, English professional footballer (Tottenham Hotspur, Norwich City, Wimbledon, Brentford, Reading).
  - Claire van Kampen, 71, English composer (Royal Shakespeare Company), playwright and theatre director, cancer.
- 19 January – Jimmy Calderwood, 69, Scottish football player (Birmingham City) and manager (Dunfermline Athletic, Aberdeen), complications from dementia.
- 20 January – John Sykes, 65, English guitarist (Tygers of Pan Tang, Whitesnake) and songwriter ("Is This Love"), cancer. (death announced on this date)
- 21 January – Dennis Crompton, 90, English architect.
- 22 January – Charlotte Raven, 55, British author and journalist (Modern Review), Huntington's disease. (death announced on this date)
- 24 January
  - David Gaskell, 84, English footballer (Manchester United, Wrexham, Wigan Athletic).
  - Joan Hanham, Baroness Hanham, 85, British politician, member of the House of Lords (1999–2020) and leader of the Kensington and Chelsea Council (1989–2000).
- 25 January – Edweena Banger, British musician (The Nosebleeds, Slaughter & The Dogs). (death announced on this date)
- 26 January – Michael Baggott, 51, British antiques dealer and television personality (Flog It!), heart attack.
- 27 January
  - Sir Patrick Rowe, 85, British rear admiral.
  - Andrew N. Schofield, 94, British engineer (University of Cambridge).
- 29 January
  - Julian Bennett, 75, British archaeologist.
  - Richard Williamson, 84, English traditionalist Catholic prelate, bishop of the Society of Saint Pius X (1988–2012), brain haemorrhage.
- 30 January – Marianne Faithfull, 78, English singer ("As Tears Go By"), songwriter ("Broken English") and actress (The Girl on a Motorcycle).

== February ==
- 1 February
  - Peter Bassano, 79–80, English trombonist ("Hey Jude") and conductor.
  - John Montagu, 11th Earl of Sandwich, 81, British aristocrat, businessman and politician, member of the House of Lords (1995–2024).
- 2 February
  - Tony Martin, 80, English farmer and convicted criminal, stroke.
  - Brian Murphy, 92, English actor (Man About the House, George and Mildred, Last of the Summer Wine), cancer.
  - Alan Shoulder, 71, English football player (Newcastle United, Carlisle United, Hartlepool United) and manager.
- 3 February
  - Michael Burawoy, 77, sociologist, traffic collision.
  - Mark Dyczkowski, 73, English Indologist. (death announced on this date)
- 4 February
  - Aga Khan IV, 88, Swiss-born British-Portuguese religious leader, imam of Nizari Ismaili (since 1957).
  - Stewart Reuben, 85, British chess and professional poker player.
  - Brian Scrivens, 87, English dual-code rugby player (Newport RFC, Wigan). (death announced on this date)
  - Solly Wolf, 75, British businessman.
- 5 February – Mike Ratledge, 81, British musician (Soft Machine).
- 6 February
  - Kenneth Kitchen, 92–93, British biblical scholar and historian. (death announced on this date)
  - Gordon Marshall, 85, English-Scottish footballer (Heart of Midlothian, Newcastle United, Arbroath). (death announced on this date)
  - Ernie Walley, 91, Welsh football player (Middlesbrough, Tottenham Hotspur) and manager (Barking). (death announced on this date)
- 7 February
  - Dafydd Elis-Thomas, Baron Elis-Thomas, 78, Welsh politician, llywydd of the Senedd (1999–2011), MP (1974–1992) and member of the House of Lords (since 1992).
  - Mick Walker, 84, English football player and manager (Notts County).
- 10 February – John Tudor, 78, English footballer (Newcastle United, Sheffield United, Coventry City), complications from dementia. (death announced on this date)
- 11 February
  - Graham Richards, 85, English chemist.
  - Joseph Saumarez Smith, 53, British horseracing administrator, chairman of the British Horseracing Authority (2022–2025), lung cancer. (death announced on this date)
- 12 February
  - Tony Bedeau, 45, British-born Grenadian footballer (Torquay United). (death announced on this date)
  - Denis Wick, 93, British trombonist.
- 13 February – Ronnie Boyce, 82, English footballer (West Ham United).
- 14 February
  - Patrick Barclay, 77, British sportswriter (The Times, The Sunday Telegraph) and television personality (Sunday Supplement). (death announced on this date)
  - Fulke Johnson Houghton, 84, British Thoroughbred racehorse trainer. (death announced on this date)
- 16 February
  - Barry Panter, politician (Mayor of Newcastle-under-Lyme), car crash. (death reported on this date)
  - Julian Holloway, 80, British actor (Carry On, James Bond Jr., Regular Show).
- 17 February – Jamie Muir, 82, Scottish painter and musician (King Crimson).
- 18 February
  - Rick Buckler, 69, English drummer (the Jam).
  - Peter Line, 94, English lawn bowler.
  - James Martin, 93, Scottish actor (Still Game).
- 19 February
  - Snowy Fleet, 79, English-born Australian drummer (The Easybeats).
  - Joe Haines, 97, British journalist and public servant, Downing Street press secretary (1969–1970, 1974–1976).
  - Cammy Murray, 80, Scottish footballer (St. Mirren, Motherwell, Arbroath).
- 20 February – Evan Williams, 81, Scottish footballer (Wolverhampton Wanderers, Celtic, Clyde).
- 21 February – D. G. Hessayon, 96, British author and botanist. (death announced on this date)
- 24 February – Howard Burns, 86, British architectural historian. (death announced on this date)
- 25 February
  - Henry Kelly, 78, Irish television presenter (Going for Gold, Game for a Laugh) and broadcaster (Classic FM).
  - Simon Lindley, 76, English organist, choirmaster and composer.
- 26 February – James Lockhart, 94, classical music conductor
- 27 February – Christopher Hughes, 77, English professional quizzer (Eggheads). (death announced on this date)
- 28 February – Tuppy Owens, 80, English human rights and sexual health activist, therapist, consultant, campaigner, writer and adult model.

== March ==
- 1 March
  - Joey Molland, 77, English songwriter, guitarist (Badfinger).
  - Jack Vettriano, 73, Scottish painter.
- 3 March
  - Kathryn Apanowicz, 64, British actress (Angels, EastEnders) and television presenter (Calendar). (death announced on this date)
  - Dennis Bond, 77, English footballer (Watford, Charlton Athletic, Tottenham Hotspur). (death announced on this date)
  - Geraint Jarman, 74, Welsh musician, poet and television producer.
- 4 March
  - Bill Dare, 64, English television producer and writer (Dead Ringers, The Now Show, Spitting Image). (death announced on this date)
  - Peter Eyre, 85, English cricketer (Derbyshire). (death announced on this date)
- 6 March – Brian James, 70, English punk rock guitarist (The Damned, The Lords of the New Church) and songwriter ("New Rose").
- 8 March – Ray Snowball, 92, English footballer (Darlington). (death announced on this date)
- 9 March
  - Simon Fisher-Becker, 63, English actor (Puppy Love, Harry Potter and the Philosopher's Stone, Doctor Who).
  - Dick McTaggart, 89, Scottish boxer, Olympic champion (1956).
- 10 March – Stedman Pearson, 60, British singer (Five Star), complications from diabetes.
- 11 March – Brian Waites, 85, English golfer. (death announced on this date)
- 12 March
  - Steve Fleet, 87, English football player (Wrexham, Stockport County) and manager (ÍBV). (death announced on this date)
  - Maisie Trollette, 91, British drag queen.
- 15 March
  - Les Binks, 73–74, Northern Irish heavy metal drummer.
- 16 March
  - Jonathan Durham, 59, English footballer (Torquay United, Rotherham United). (death announced on this date)
  - Doug Laughton, 80, English rugby league player (Widnes, Lancashire, Great Britain national team) and coach. (death announced on this date)
- 17 March
  - Peter Farrelly, 76, Northern Irish musician (Fruupp). (death announced on this date)
  - John Fraser, 88, Scottish footballer (Hibernian, Stenhousemuir). (death announced on this date)
  - Colin McFadyean, 82, English rugby union player (Moseley, national team, British Lions). (death announced on this date)
- 19 March – William Taylor, 80, British barrister, judge, and university chairman.
- 20 March – Sir Torquil Norman, 91, British businessman and arts philanthropist.
- 22 March
  - Andy Peebles, 76, radio DJ (BBC Radio 1), television presenter (Top of the Pops) and cricket commentator.
  - Paul Wagstaff, 60, British guitarist (Paris Angels, Black Grape). (death announced on this date)
- 24 March – Alan Cuckston, 85, classical music harpsichordist, pianist, conductor, and lecturer
- 26 March – Nicolas Kynaston, 83, classical music organist
- 27 March
  - Peter Lever, 84, English cricketer (Lancashire, Tasmania, national team). (death announced on this date)
  - Christina McKelvie, 57, Scottish politician, MSP (since 2007), minister for culture (2023–2024) and drugs and alcohol policy (since 2024), breast cancer.
- 30 March – Stanley Kalms, Baron Kalms, 93, British businessman, chairman of Currys, and life peer, member of the House of Lords (2004–2024).
- 31 March
  - Janric Craig, 3rd Viscount Craigavon, 80, British hereditary peer and member of the House of Lords (since 1974)
  - Andria Hall, 68–69, British ballerina (English National Ballet). (death announced on this date)
  - Betty Webb, 101, English code breaker.

== April ==
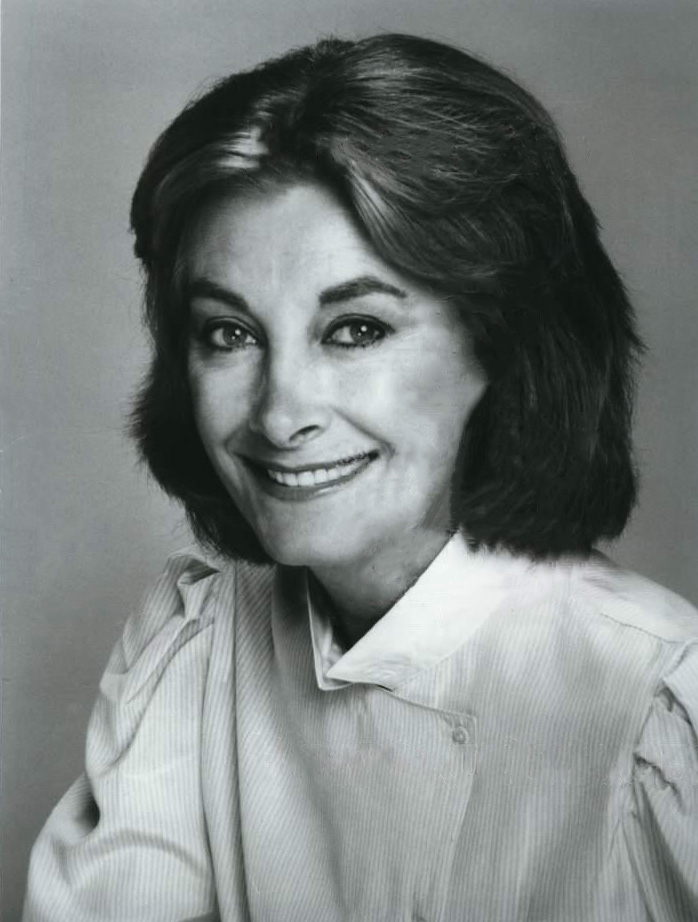
Jean Marsh in 1982

- 1 April – Trevor Lock, 85, British policeman (Iranian Embassy siege), George Medal recipient. (death reported on this date)
- 2 April – Johnny King, 92, English footballer (Crewe Alexandra, Stoke City, Cardiff City).
- 3 April
  - Gordon Faith, 94, British actor (Doctor Who, Adam Adamant Lives!, War & Peace). (death announced on this date)
  - Andy Wharton, 63, English footballer (Burnley, Torquay United, Chester City). (death announced on this date)
- 4 April
  - Paul Karo, 89, Scottish-born Australian actor (Quiet Night, The Box, Prisoner).
  - Kate Orchard, 102, RAF veteran (Women's Auxiliary Corps, World War II).
- 5 April
  - Dave Allen, 69, English bassist (Gang of Four, Shriekback, King Swamp).
  - Corrin Brooks-Meade, 37, English-born Montserratian footballer (Alki Larnaca, Nea Salamis, Montserrat national team).
  - Roy Daines, 102, RAF veteran (No. 192 Squadron RAF, World War II). (death announced on this date)
- 7 April
  - Brian Jones, 89, Welsh rugby union player (Newport RFC, national team). (death announced on this date)
  - Peter McEvoy, 72, British golfer. (death announced on this date)
  - Derek Whitehead, 81, English rugby league footballer (Warrington, Lancashire, national team). (death announced on this date)
- 10 April
  - Anne Harper, 83, British activist, co-founder of Women Against Pit Closures.
  - Peter Lovesey, 88, British writer (Wobble to Death, The Last Detective, The False Inspector Dew).
  - David Sassoon, 92, British fashion designer. (death announced on this date)
- 11 April – Mike Berry, 82, English singer ("The Sunshine of Your Smile") and actor (Are You Being Served?, Worzel Gummidge).
- 13 April – Jean Marsh, 90, English actress (Upstairs, Downstairs, The House of Eliott, Willow) and television writer, Emmy winner (1975), complications from dementia.
- 14 April
  - Carlton Fairweather, 63, English football player (Wimbledon, Bromley) and manager (Sunderland Women), pancreatic cancer.
  - Paddy Higson, 83, Scottish film producer (The Magdalene Sisters) and production supervisor (Gregory's Girl). (death reported on this date)
- 17 April
  - Colin Berry, 79, British radio disc jockey, presenter and newsreader (BBC Radio 2).
  - Joe Thompson, 36, English footballer (Rochdale, Tranmere Rovers, Southport), lymphoma.
- 18 April – Clodagh Rodgers, 78, Northern Irish singer ("Come Back and Shake Me", "Goodnight Midnight", "Jack in the Box").
- 19 April – Barry Hoban, 85, English Olympic racing cyclist (1960).
- 20 April – Jeff Evans, 70, Welsh cricket umpire. (death announced on this date)
- 23 April
  - David Clunie, 77, Scottish footballer (Heart of Midlothian, Berwick Rangers, St Johnstone). (death announced on this date)
  - Jim Herriot, 85, Scottish footballer (Dunfermline Athletic, Birmingham City, national team).
  - Peter Taaffe, 83, British Marxist militant.
- 24 April – Roy Phillips, 83, British musician (The Peddlers).
- 25 April – Philip Lowrie, 88, English actor (Coronation Street, Victoria Wood, Home Fires).
- 26 April – Charles Beare, 87–88, British violin expert and craftsman.
- 27 April – Wizz Jones, 86, English acoustic guitarist and singer-songwriter.
- 28 April – Mike Peters, 66, Welsh rock singer (The Alarm) and songwriter ("Sixty Eight Guns"), chronic lymphocytic leukemia.
- 29 April – Jane Gardam, 96, English author (The Queen of the Tambourine, Old Filth, God on the Rocks). (death announced on this date)
- 30 April – Peter Burridge, 91, English footballer (Millwall, Crystal Palace, Charlton Athletic).

== May ==
- 1 May – David Woodfield, 81, English football player (Wolverhampton Wanderers, Watford) and manager (Sabah). (death announced on this date)
- 3 May –
  - Elsbeth Hamilton, 104, Czechoslovak-born British Women's Auxiliary Air Force radio operator, last surviving Czechoslovak World War II veteran in the United Kingdom,
  - Ken Hancock, 87, English football player (Port Vale, Ipswich Town) and manager (Leek Town). (death announced on this date)
- 4 May
  - Peter McParland, 91, Northern Irish football player (Aston Villa, national team) and manager (Glentoran).
  - Tom Youngs, 45, English footballer (Cambridge United, Northampton Town, Bury), complications from multiple sclerosis.
- 5 May
  - Jake Findlay, 70, Scottish footballer (Aston Villa, Luton Town, Swindon Town). (death announced on this date)
  - Owen Jenner, 21, British motorcycle racer, race crash.
- 6 May – Terence Etherton, Baron Etherton, 73, British judge and politician, Master of the Rolls (2016–2021), chancellor of the High Court (2013–2016), and member of the House of Lords (since 2021).
- 7 May – Ronald Corp, 74 classical music composer and conductor
- 9 May
  - Sir Tom Farmer, 84, British car servicing executive, founder and CEO (1971–2002) of Kwik-Fit.
  - Mark Jabalé, 91, Welsh Roman Catholic prelate, bishop coadjutor (2000–2001) and bishop (2001–2008) of Minevia.
- 10 May
  - Matthew Best, 68, English conductor and singer.
  - Gerry Francis, 91, English footballer (Tonbridge Angels, Leeds United, York City).
  - John Gale, 95, British theatrical producer and artistic director.
- 11 May
  - Colin Booth, 90, English footballer (Doncaster Rovers, Nottingham Forest, Wolverhampton Wanderers).
  - Aidan Chambers, 90, English author (Postcards from No Man's Land).
  - Anne Dunham, 76, British equestrian, six-time Paralympic champion.
- 13 May
  - Derek Hallas, 90–91, English dual-code rugby player (Keighley, Parramatta Eels, Great Britain national team).
  - Charles Phythian-Adams, 87, English historian.
- 14 May
  - Chic Bates, 75, English football player (Shrewsbury Town, Swindon Town) and manager (Stoke City). (death announced on this date)
  - Alan Grieve, 97, British lawyer and charity founder (Jerwood Foundation).
- 15 May – Robert Brooke, 85, English cricket writer.
- 16 May
  - Duncan Campbell, 80, British investigative journalist.
  - Andy Tyrie, 85, Northern Irish loyalist paramilitary leader, chairman of the Ulster Defence Association (1973–1988).
- 17 May
  - Jackie Edwards, 85, English rugby league player (Warrington, Lancashire).
  - Gawn Grainger, 87, Scottish actor and writer.
  - Stuart Farrimond, 43, British Science communicator and writer.
- 18 May – John Simpson, 100, Scottish-born New Zealand silversmith and fine arts academic.
- 20 May –
  - Barry Fantoni, 85, British author and cartoonist (Private Eye), heart attack.
  - Alec Farrall, 89, English footballer (Everton, Gillingham, Watford).
  - Patrick O'Flynn, 59, British journalist (Daily Express) and politician, MEP (2014–2019), cancer. (death announced on this date)
- 21 May – Billy Williams, 95, English cinematographer (Women in Love, On Golden Pond, Gandhi), Oscar winner (1983).
- 22 May
  - Amanda Feilding, 82, English drug policy reformer, lobbyist, research coordinator and founder of the Beckley Foundation.
  - Mark Jones, 59, Welsh rugby league and rugby union player (Hull, Warrington), heart attack.
  - Alasdair MacIntyre, 96, Scottish-American philosopher (After Virtue). (death announced on this date)
  - Georgia O'Connor, 25, English boxer, cancer. (death announced on this date)
- 24 May
  - John Peters, 75, British radio presenter (Radio Trent, Boom Radio).
  - Gary Pierce, 74, English footballer (Wolverhampton Wanderers, Barnsley, Blackpool).
  - Sir Derek Reffell, 96, British naval officer, governor of Gibraltar (1989–1993). (death announced on this date)
  - Alan Yentob, 78, British television executive and presenter.
- 25 May – Simon House, 76, English multi-instrumentalist (Hawkwind, David Bowie, Third Ear Band).
- 27 May
  - Brian Kellock, 63, Scottish jazz pianist.
  - Barry McIlheney, 64–65, British journalist and editor (Empire). (death announced on this date)
  - Willie Stevenson, 85, Scottish footballer (Rangers, Liverpool, Stoke City). (death announced on this date)
- 28 May
  - Graeme Crawford, 77, Scottish footballer (York City, Scunthorpe United, Scarborough). (death announced on this date)
  - Sir Bob Reid, 91, British railway executive, chairman of the British Railways Board (1990–1995).
- 29 May – Sam Gardiner, 24, Race Across the World contestant, car crash.
- 31 May – Sir Kenneth Bloomfield, 94, civil servant.

== June ==
- 1 June – Lachie Stewart, 81, Scottish Olympic runner (1972).
- 2 June –
  - Margaret A. Dix, 86, British-born Guatemalan botanist.
  - Colin Jerwood, 63, English punk singer (Conflict).
- 4 June – Harry Kelleher, 96, English cricketer (Surrey, Northamptonshire). (death announced on this date)
- 8 June – Uriah Rennie, 65, English football referee.
- 9 June
  - Peter Easterby, 95, British racehorse trainer.
  - Frederick Forsyth, 86, English novelist (The Day of the Jackal, The Odessa File, The Fourth Protocol).
  - Pik-Sen Lim, 80, Malaysian-born British actress (Plenty, Johnny English Reborn, Dark Souls).
- 11 June – Douglas McCarthy, 58, English musician (Nitzer Ebb).
- 12 June – John Noone, 89, British writer. (death announced on this date)
- 13 June
  - Seán Neeson, 79, Northern Irish politician, MLA (1982–1986, 1998–2011).
  - Honest John Plain, 73, English guitarist and singer (The Boys).
- 16 June
  - Dick Edwards, 82, English footballer (Aston Villa, Mansfield Town, Torquay United). (death announced on this date)
  - John Reid, 61, Scottish record producer, singer (Nightcrawlers) and songwriter. (death announced on this date)
  - Kim Woodburn, 83, English television personality (How Clean Is Your House?, Celebrity Big Brother).
- 19 June – James Prime, 64, Scottish musician (Deacon Blue), cancer.
- 20 June
  - David Boyle, 67, British author (The Sum of Our Discontent, Broke: Who Killed the Middle Classes?) and journalist.
  - Sir Francis Graham-Smith, 102, British astronomer, astronomer royal (1982–1990).
  - Ian McLauchlan, 83, Scottish rugby union player (national team, British & Irish Lions).
  - Patrick Walden, 46, English guitarist (Babyshambles).
- 21 June
  - David Lawrence, 61, English cricketer (Gloucestershire, national team), complications from motor neurone disease.
  - Dudley Lewis, 62, Welsh footballer (Swansea City, Huddersfield Town, national team). (death announced on this date)
- 23 June
  - Liam Byrne, 24, Scottish skydiving instructor and wingsuit flyer. (death reported on this date)
  - John Clark, 84, Scottish football player (Celtic, national team) and manager (Clyde). (death announced on this date)
  - Mick Ralphs, 81, English Hall of Fame guitarist (Mott the Hoople, Bad Company) and songwriter ("Feel Like Makin' Love"), complications from a stroke. (death announced on this date)
- 27 June
  - Barry Hills, 88, British thoroughbred horse trainer.
  - Alan K. Huggins, 89, British philatelist.
  - Simon Marlow, broadcaster and station manager, (BFBS).
  - Terry Miles, 88, English footballer (Port Vale).
- 28 June
  - Wayne Larkins, 71, English cricketer (Northamptonshire, national team).
  - Tim Pollard, 61, English actor and entertainer (Robin Hood), cancer. (death announced on this date)
- 29 June
  - Stuart Burrows, 92, Welsh operatic tenor.
  - Sandy Gall, 97, Scottish journalist and television presenter.
  - John Mew, 96–97, British orthodontist.
  - Alan Peacock, 87, English footballer (Middlesbrough, Leeds United, national team), complications from dementia.
- 30 June
  - Frank Barrie, 88, English actor (EastEnders).
  - Kenneth Colley, 87, English actor (Star Wars, Monty Python's Life of Brian).

== July ==
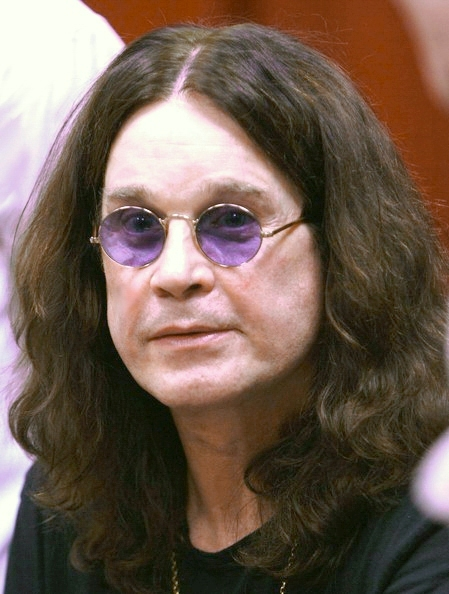
Ozzy Osbourne in 2010

- 1 July – David Lipsey, Baron Lipsey, 77, British journalist and life peer (since 1999).
- 2 July
  - Sheila Cameron, 91, British lawyer, Dean of the Arches (2001–2009).
  - Charles Chadwick, 92, English novelist. (death announced on this date)
  - Gerald Harper, 96, English actor (Hadleigh, Adam Adamant Lives!, A Night to Remember).
  - Diana McVeagh, 98, classical music scholar
- 3 July
  - Tim Baker, 59, British born Manx politician, MHK (2016–2021), Infrastructure Minister (2020–2021).
  - Stephen Vaughan Sr., 62–63, English football club owner (Barrow, Chester City) and convicted criminal. (death announced on this date)
- 4 July
  - Gordon Jago, 92, English football player (Charlton Athletic) and manager (Queens Park Rangers, Dallas Sidekicks).
  - Kevin Riddles, 68, British bassist and keyboardist (Angel Witch, Tytan).
  - David Killick, 87, English actor (The Crown, A Touch of Frost, Doctor Who).
- 7 July
  - Wayne Dobson, 68, English magician.
  - Norman Tebbit, 94, British politician, Chairman of the Conservative Party (1985–1987).
- 9 July
  - Ian Blair, Baron Blair of Boughton, 72, British police officer and life peer, Commissioner of Police of the Metropolis (2005–2008), member of the House of Lords (since 2010).
  - Glen Michael, 99, British children's television presenter and entertainer.
  - Steven Rose, 87, English neuroscientist (Not in Our Genes).
- 10 July – Phil Mulloy, 76, British animator.
- 11 July
  - Donald Rose, 110, English supercentenarian and World War II veteran.
  - Iris Williams, 79, Welsh singer. (death announced on this date)
  - Billy Wilson, 88, Northern Irish footballer (Linfield). (death announced on this date)
- 13 July
  - Muhammadu Buhari, 82, Nigerian politician, President of Nigeria (1983–1985, 2015–2023).
  - Dave Cousins, 85, English musician (Strawbs) and songwriter ("Lay Down", "Shine on Silver Sun").
  - Mark Schreiber, Baron Marlesford, 93, British politician, member of the House of Lords (since 1991).
- 14 July
  - Charlie Miller, 80, Scottish celebrity hairdresser.
  - Paddy Summerfield, 96, English artist and poet. (death announced on this date)
- 15 July
  - Billy April, 61, British musician (Driza Bone), record producer and songwriter. (death announced on this date)
  - Judy Loe, 78, English actress (Singles, Space Island One, Casualty), cancer.
- 17 July
  - Wyn Davies, 83, Welsh footballer (Newcastle United, Bolton Wanderers, national team). (death announced on this date)
  - Tommy Gallagher, 82, Northern Irish politician, MLA (1998–2011). (death announced on this date)
- 18 July –
  - David Alliance, Baron Alliance, 93, Iranian-born British businessman, member of the House of Lords (2004–2025).
  - Pasty Harris, 81, English cricketer (Middlesex, Nottinghamshire, Wellington). (death announced on this date)
  - Sir Roger Norrington, 91, British conductor.
- 21 July
  - Kenneth Calman, Scottish doctor and academic, Chief Medical Officer for Scotland, 1989–91.
  - David Rendall, 76, classical music tenor
- 22 July
  - Joey Jones, 70, Welsh footballer (Wrexham, Liverpool, national team).
  - Sir Jamie McGrigor, 6th Baronet, 75, Scottish politician, MSP (1999–2016). (death announced on this date)
  - Ozzy Osbourne, 76, English musician (Black Sabbath), songwriter ("Paranoid") and television personality (The Osbournes).
  - John Palmer, 82, English musician (Family, Blossom Toes, Bakerloo). (death announced on this date)
- 23 July
  - Brian Owen, 80, English footballer (Watford, Colchester United, Wolverhampton Wanderers).
  - Tony Peers, 78, British actor (Emmerdale, Coronation Street, L.A. Without a Map).
  - Jeffery Rowthorn, 91, Welsh Anglican bishop and hymnographer.
- 24 July – Dame Cleo Laine, 97, English jazz singer.
- 25 July – Gerry Kersey, 86, broadcaster (BBC Radio Sheffield, Hallam FM).
- 26 July
  - Ray French, 85, English rugby league (St. Helens, Widnes) and union (national team) player, dementia. (death announced on this date)
  - Willie Irvine, 82, Northern Irish footballer (Burnley, Preston North End, national team). (death announced on this date)
  - David Nabarro, 75, British medical academic and international civil servant.
- 28 July
  - P. J. Marshall, 91–92, British historian.
  - Amelia Freedman, 84, British arts administrator (Nash Ensemble).
- 29 July
  - Allan Ahlberg, 87, British children's author (Burglar Bill, The Jolly Postman).
  - Paul Mario Day, 69, English singer (Iron Maiden, More, The Sweet), cancer.
  - Meghnad Desai, Baron Desai, 85, Indian-born British economist and politician, member of the House of Lords (since 1991).
  - Mark Lazarus, 86, English footballer (QPR, Leyton Orient).
- 30 July
  - Alan Finney, 91, English footballer (Sheffield Wednesday, Doncaster Rovers, Alfreton Town).
  - Sylvia Young, 86, British theatre teacher, founder of the Sylvia Young Theatre School.

== August ==
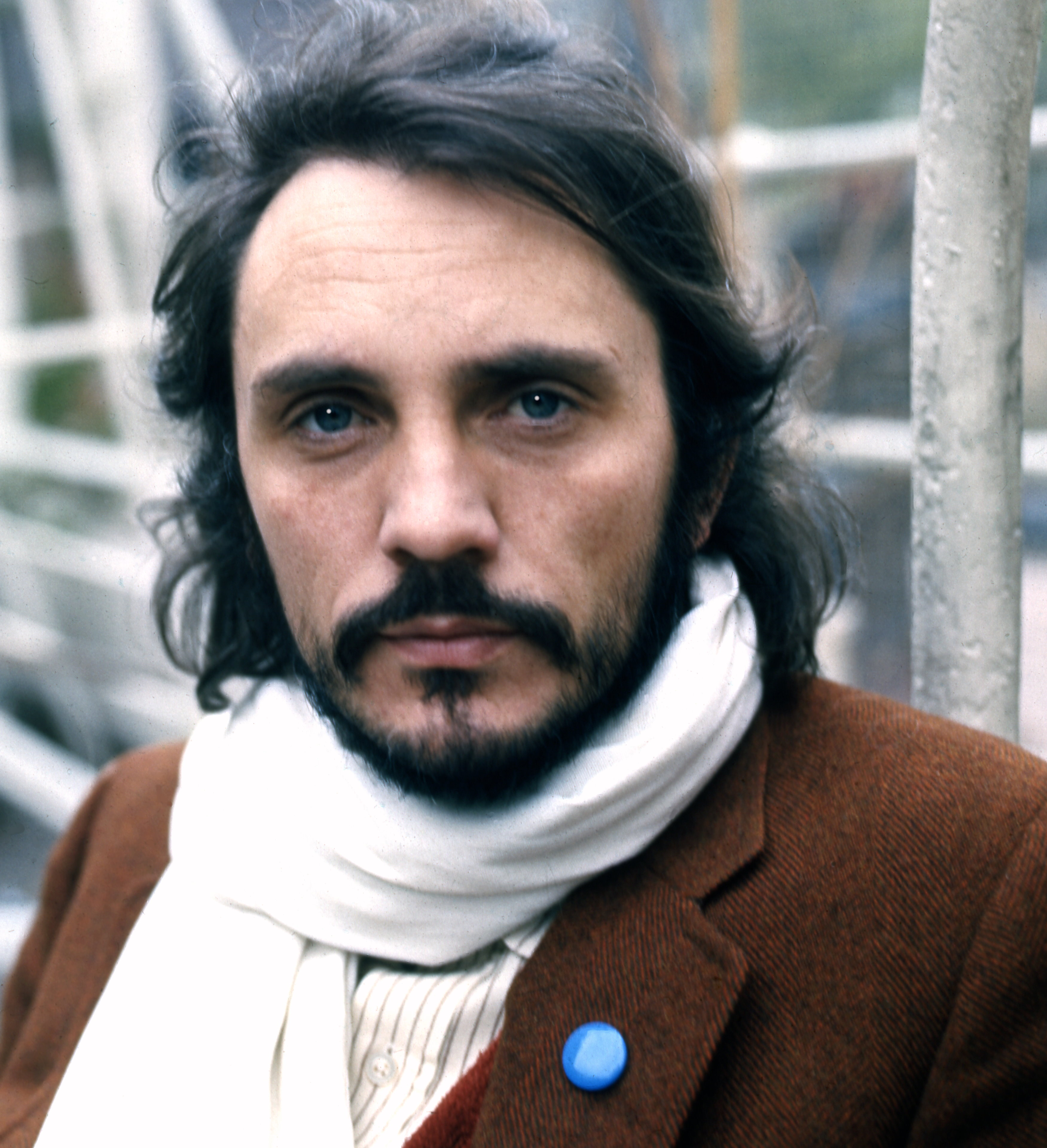
Terence Stamp in 1973

- 2 August – Norman Eshley, 80, English actor (George and Mildred, See No Evil, Brookside), cancer.
- 3 August – Stella Rimington, 90, British author and Director General of MI5 (1992–1996).
- 4 August
  - Tom Sawyer, Baron Sawyer, 82, British trade unionist and politician, member of the House of Lords (since 1998). (death announced on this date)
  - James Whale, 74, English radio and television presenter.
- 5 August – Terry Reid, 75, English rock singer (Peter Jay and the Jaywalkers). (death announced on this date)
- 8 August – Terry Hennessey, 82, Welsh footballer (Birmingham City, Nottingham Forest, national team).
- 9 August
  - Ray Brooks, 86, English actor (Cathy Come Home, Big Deal, Coronation Street).
  - Brian Wade, 80, British convicted murderer.
- 10 August – Biddy Baxter, 92, English television producer (Blue Peter).
- 12 August
  - Richard Carr, 87, English football executive (Arsenal). (death announced on this date)
  - Hefin David, 47, Welsh politician, Member of the Senedd (2016–2025).
  - Barbara Harvey, 97, British medieval historian.
  - David Milne, 66, Scottish rugby union player (Heriot's, Edinburgh District, national team).
  - Sir George Reid, 86, Scottish politician, presiding officer of the Scottish Parliament (2003–2007), kidney cancer.
- 13 August
  - Jack Brennan, 89, English rugby league player (Blackpool Borough, Salford Red Devils, Lancashire). (death announced on this date)
  - Geoff Foulds, 85, English snooker player. (death announced on this date)
- 14 August – Sammy Johnston, 58, Scottish footballer (St Johnstone, Glenavon, Partick Thistle).
- 15 August – Gary Little, 60s, Scottish comedian. (death reported on this date)
- 16 August – John Cruickshank, 105, Scottish Royal Air Force officer, Victoria Cross recipient. (death announced on this date)
- 17 August – Terence Stamp, 87, English actor (Superman, The Adventures of Priscilla, Queen of the Desert, Billy Budd).
- 19 August – Ken Shuttleworth, 80, English cricketer (Lancashire, Leicestershire, national team). (death announced on this date)
- 20 August – Dame Annette Brooke, 78, British politician, MP (2001–2015).
- 21 August
  - Swraj Paul, Baron Paul, 94, Indian-born British industrialist and politician, member of the House of Lords (since 1996).
  - Rod Petrie, 69, Scottish football executive, chairman of Hibernian (2004–2019), cancer.
- 22 August – Martin Smyth, 94, Northern Irish politician, MLA (1982–1986) and MP (1982–2005). (death announced on this date)
- 23 August
  - Giles Havergal, 87, Scottish theatre director, actor and adaptor.
  - Dave Taylor, 61, British comic book artist (Force Works, Batman, Judge Dredd).
- 25 August
  - Gerry Harrison, 89, English football commentator. (death announced on this date)
  - Paul Johnson, 69, English footballer (Stoke City, Chester). (death announced on this date)
  - Angela Mortimer, 93, British tennis player, Wimbledon champion (1961).
  - James Mosley, 89–90, English librarian and book historian.
- 26 August
  - Akinwale Arobieke, 64, English convicted criminal.
  - David Warburton, 59, British politician, MP (2015–2023).
- 28 August – Ray Mayhew, 59–60, British drummer (Sigue Sigue Sputnik).
- 29 August – Steve Thompson, 70, English football player (Lincoln City, Charlton Athletic) and manager (Lincoln City), cancer. (death announced on this date)
- 30 August
  - Tim Boswell, Baron Boswell of Aynho, 82, British politician, MP (1987–2010) and member of the House of Lords (2010–2025).
  - Ruth Elton, 91, British-Nigerian Christian missionary.

== September ==
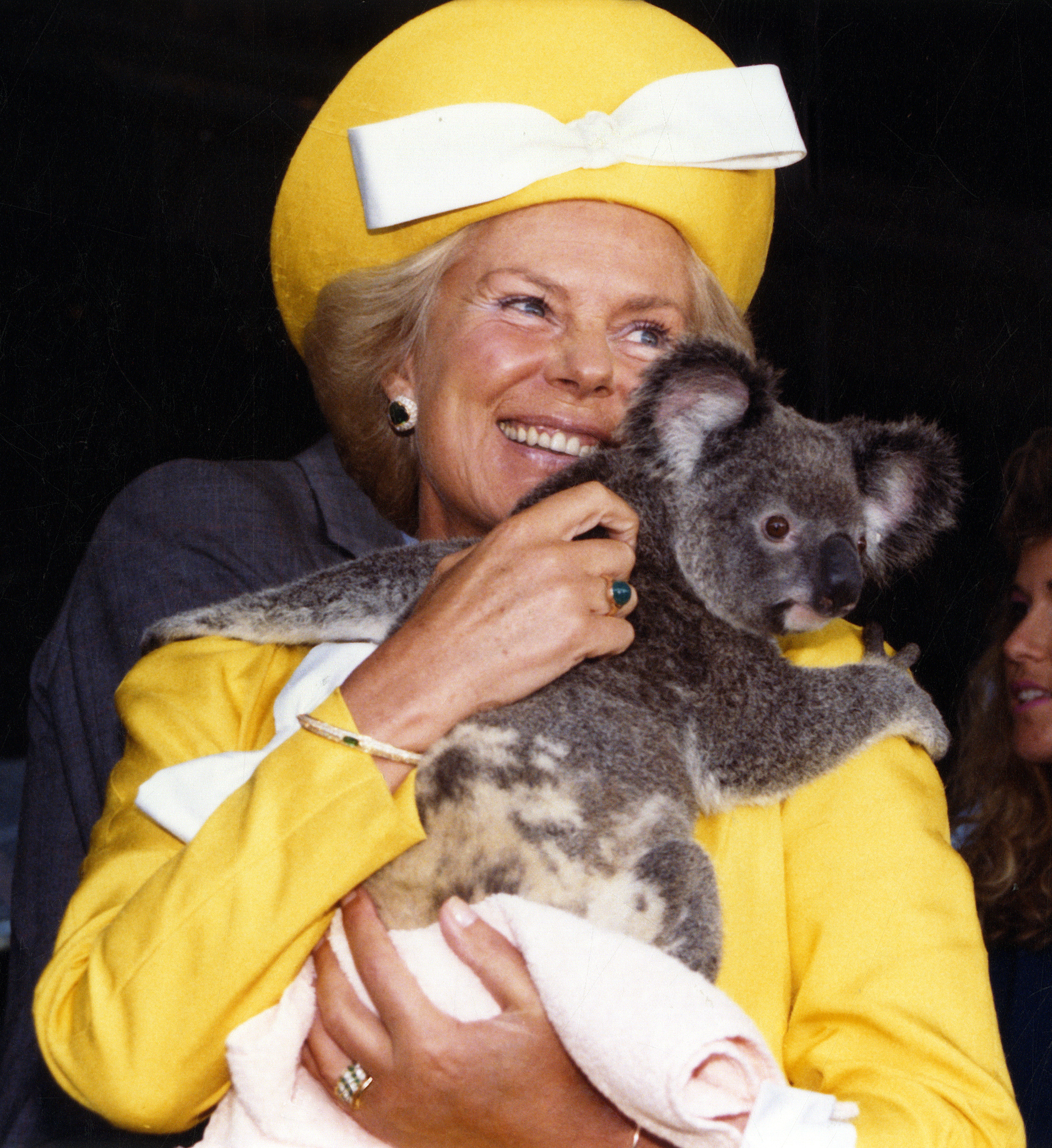
Katharine, Duchess of Kent in 1988

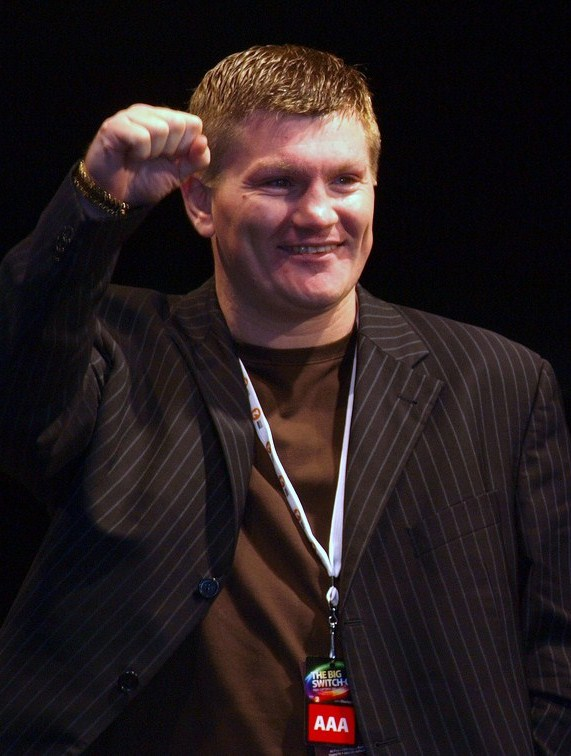
Ricky Hatton in 2009

- 1 September
  - Jimmy Bone, 75, Scottish footballer.
  - Joe Bugner, 75, Hungarian-born British-Australian boxer and actor (I'm for the Hippopotamus, Street Fighter).
- 3 September – Bobby Graham, 80, Scottish footballer (Liverpool, Motherwell).
- 4 September
  - Jamie Harvey, 70, Scottish darts player.
  - Katharine, Duchess of Kent, 92, British royal.
  - Barrie Thomas, 88, English footballer (Scunthorpe United, Newcastle United, Mansfield Town). (death announced on this date)
- 6 September – Rick Davies, 81, English musician (Supertramp), and songwriter ("Bloody Well Right", "Goodbye Stranger"), cancer.
- 7 September – Stuart Craig, 83, English production designer (Harry Potter, Gandhi, The English Patient), Oscar winner (1983, 1989, 1997), complications from Parkinson's disease.
- 8 September
  - Robin Glendinning, 87, Northern Irish playwright and politician.
  - Chris Steele-Perkins, 78, British photographer.
- 10 September
  - Mark Hine, 61, English footballer (Darlington, Peterborough United, Doncaster Rovers).
  - Alan Howarth, Baron Howarth of Newport, 81, British politician, MP (1983–2005) and member of the House of Lords (since 2005).
  - Roy Parnell, 81, English footballer (Tranmere Rovers, Bury, Everton).
- 11 September
  - Chris Hill, 80, British disc jockey.
  - Viv Prince, 84, English drummer (Pretty Things). (death announced on this date)
- 12 September – Jay Wynne, 56, British weather presenter. (death announced on this date)
- 13 September
  - Eddie Hunter, 82, Scottish football player and manager (Queen's Park).
  - Stephen Luscombe, 70, English musician (Blancmange) and songwriter ("Living on the Ceiling", "Don't Tell Me").
- 14 September
  - Sir Nicholas Grimshaw, 85, English architect.
  - Ricky Hatton, 46, English professional boxer.
- 15 September
  - John Jameson, 84, English cricketer (Warwickshire, national team). (death announced on this date)
  - Antony Maitland, 90, British children's author and illustrator.
  - Norman Toynton, 86, British abstract painter. (death announced on this date)
- 17 September
  - Roger Climpson, 93, British-born Australian television newsreader (Nine Network, Seven Network) and host (This is Your Life).
  - Barry Seal, 87, British politician, MEP (1979–1999), acute myeloid leukaemia.
- 18 September
  - Sir Gerald Gordon, 96, Scottish lawyer. (death announced on this date)
  - Charles Guthrie, Baron Guthrie of Craigiebank, 86, British field marshal, assistant chief (1987–1989) and chief (1994–1997) of the general staff, chief of the defence staff (1997–2001), ruptured cerebral aneurysm.
- 19 September
  - Ian Monk, 65, British writer and translator. (body discovered on this date)
  - JD Twitch, 57, Scottish DJ (Optimo).
- 20 September – Matt Beard, 47, English football manager (Burnley F.C. Women, Liverpool F.C. Women).
- 21 September – John Stapleton, 79, English broadcaster (Nationwide, Watchdog) and journalist (ITV), complications from Parkinson's disease and pneumonia.
- 22 September
  - Dickie Bird, 92, English cricket player (Yorkshire, Leicestershire) and umpire.
  - David Hirst, 89, British journalist (The Guardian, The Irish Times, St. Petersburg Times), cancer.
- 23 September
  - Iain Coleman, 67, British politician, MP (1997–2005). (death announced on this date)
  - Danny Thompson, 86, English bassist (Pentangle, Alexis Korner's Blues Incorporated).
  - Wootton Bassett, 17, British Thoroughbred racehorse, acute pneumonia from choking.
- 24 September
  - Patricia Crowther, 97, British Wiccan occultist.
  - Ann Granger, 86, British crime writer (Cold in the Earth). (death announced on this date)
- 25 September – Billy Vigar, 21, English footballer (Chichester City), brain injury.
- 26 September
  - Menzies Campbell, Baron Campbell of Pittenweem, 84, British politician and Olympic sprinter (1964), MP (1987–2015), member of the House of Lords (since 2015), and chancellor of the University of St Andrews (since 2006).
  - Tony Harrison, 88, English poet ("V").
  - Ken Houghton, 85, English football player (Rotherham United, Hull City, Scunthorpe United) and manager.
  - Norman Kember, 93, British biophysicist and peace activist. (death announced on this date)
- 27 September – Martin Neary, 85, English organist and choral conductor (Westminster Abbey, Winchester Cathedral), complications from Parkinson's disease.
- 28 September – Sir Terry Farrell, 87, British architect and urban designer.
- 29 September
  - John Lucas, 88, British poet, critic and publisher. (death announced on this date)
  - Patrick Murray, 68, English actor (Only Fools and Horses, Scum, Quadrophenia), lung cancer.
  - Brian Patten, 79, English poet and author.

== October ==
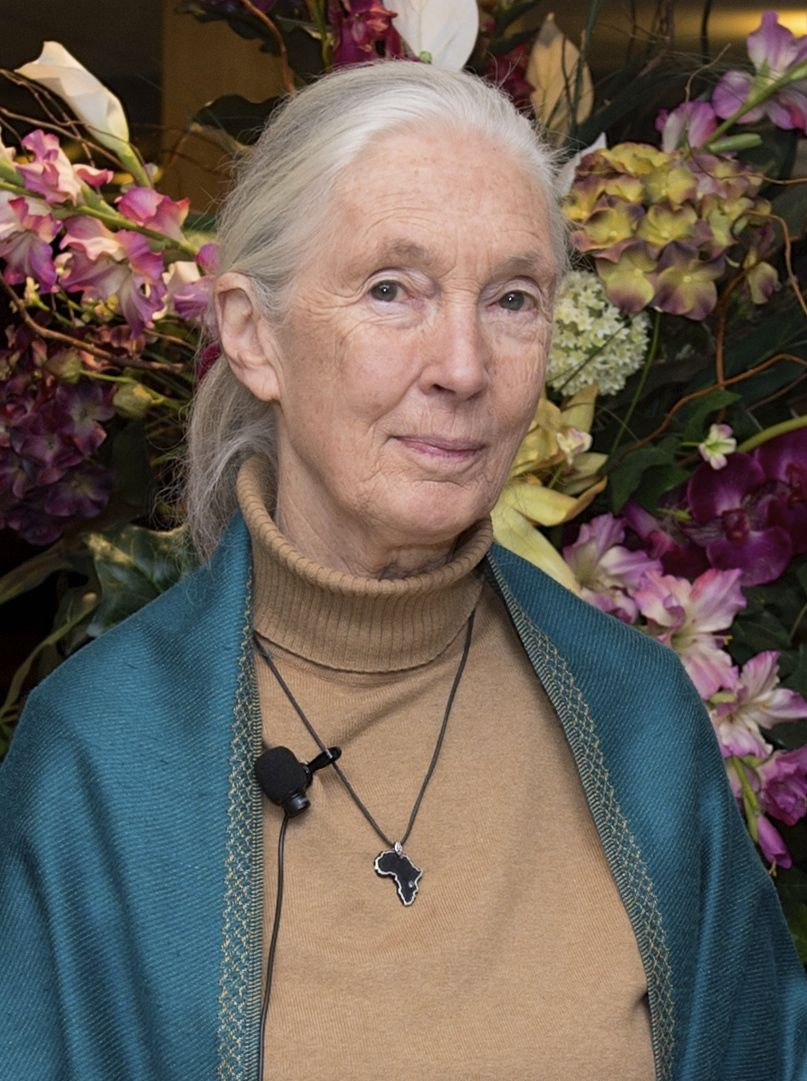
Jane Goodall in 2015

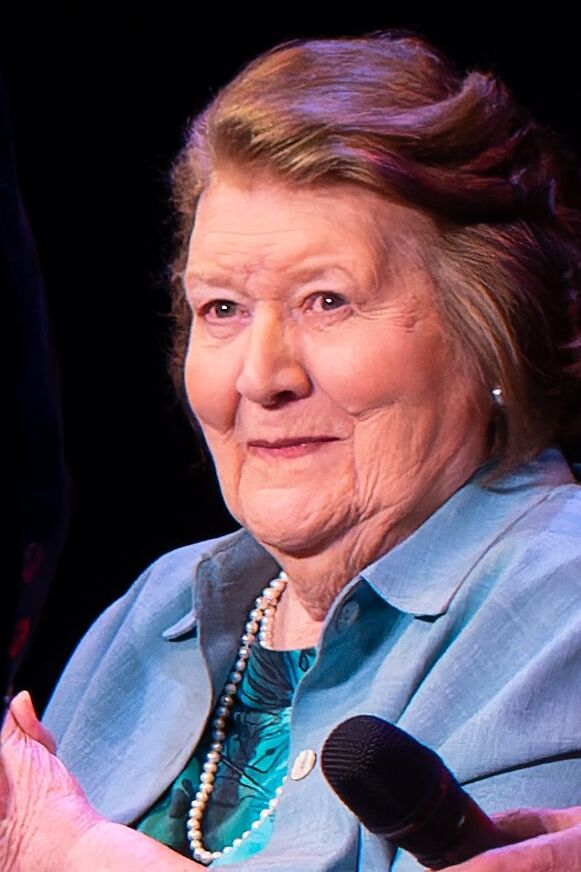
Dame Patricia Routledge in 2023

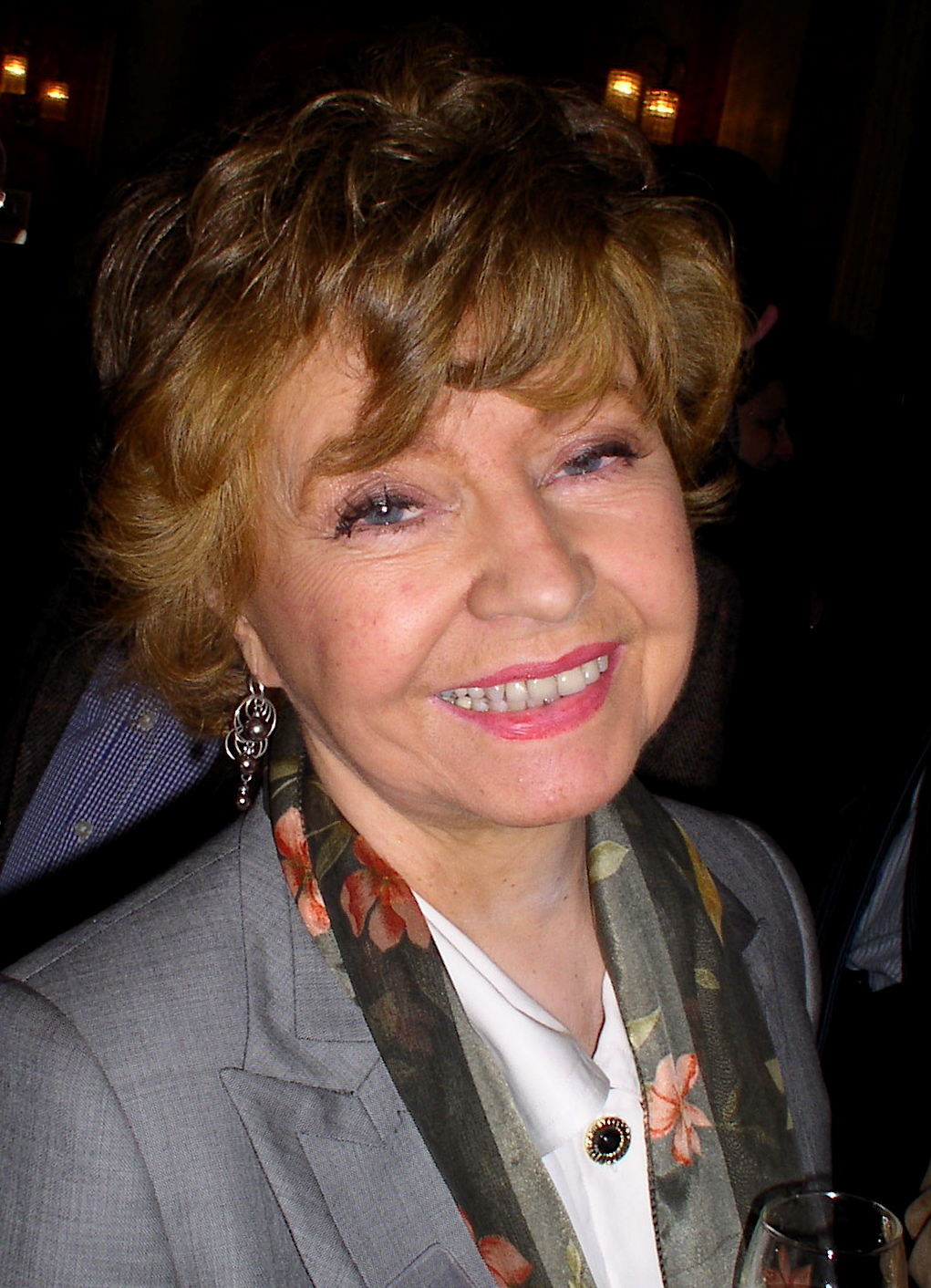
Prunella Scales in 2010

- 1 October – Jane Goodall, 91, English zoologist and primatologist.
- 2 October – Chris Dreja, 79, English Hall of Fame guitarist (The Yardbirds). (death announced on this date)
- 3 October – Dame Patricia Routledge, 96, English actress and singer (Keeping Up Appearances, Talking Heads, Hetty Wainthropp Investigates, Coronation Street, Victoria Wood: As Seen on TV).
- 4 October
  - Willie McFaul, 82, Northern Irish football player (Newcastle United, national team) and manager (Guam national team). (death announced on this date)
  - Paul Mosley, 58, English criminal convicted for his role in the 2012 Derby arson attack.
- 5 October – Dame Jilly Cooper, 88, English author (Emily, Octavia, Rutshire Chronicles), fall.
- 6 October
  - Mick Harrison, 79, English rugby league player (Leeds, Hull F.C., national team). (death announced on this date)
  - Ben Lewis, 46, English-born Australian actor (Love Never Dies, The Phantom of the Opera), bowel cancer.
  - John Woodvine, 96, English actor (An American Werewolf in London, Z-Cars, Doctor Who).
- 7 October
  - Sir John Gurdon, 92, English biologist, Nobel Prize laureate (2012). (death announced on this date)
  - Alan Hawley, 79, English footballer (Brentford, Wimbledon). (death announced on this date)
- 8 October – Ace Finchum, 62, British drummer (Tigertailz, Marseille, Tokyo Blade). (death announced on this date)
- 9 October – Jimmy Nicholson, 82, Northern Irish footballer (Manchester United, Huddersfield Town, national team).
- 10 October – John Lodge, 82, English Hall of Fame musician (The Moody Blues) and songwriter ("I'm Just a Singer (In a Rock and Roll Band)", "Gemini Dream").
- 11 October – Ian Watkins, 48, Welsh singer (Lostprophets) and convicted paedophile, stabbed.
- 12 October –
  - Sir Benjamin Bathurst, 89, British Royal Navy officer. (death announced on this date)
  - John Graham, 58, Northern Irish-born Canadian racing driver, brain cancer.
  - John Waterhouse, 75, British guitarist (Demon).
- 13 October
  - Tony Caunter, 88, English actor (EastEnders, Queenie’s Castle, Juliet Bravo).
  - Matt Tolfrey, 44, English DJ, producer and record label owner. (death announced on this date)
- 14 October – Rosalind Howells, Baroness Howells of St Davids, 94, British politician, member of the House of Lords (1999–2019).
- 15 October – Samantha Eggar, 86, English-American actress (The Collector, Doctor Dolittle, The Brood).
- 18 October
  - Lady Annabel Goldsmith, 91, English socialite, namesake of Annabel's.
  - Martin Townsend, 65, British journalist, editor of the Sunday Express (2001–2018), pancreatic cancer.
- 19 October – Duncan Davidson, 84, British homebuilding industry executive, founder of Persimmon plc.
- 20 October – Oliver Colvile, 66, British politician, MP (2010–2017).
- 22 October – David Ball, 66, English musician (Soft Cell, The Grid).
- 23 October
  - Mick McNeil, 85, English footballer (Middlesbrough, Ipswich Town, national team). (death announced on this date)
  - David Wilde, 90, English pianist.
  - Tim O'Donovan, 93, English monarchist, Court Circular analyst.
- 24 October – Bob Wilson, 91, Scottish footballer.
- 25 October
  - Tony Adams, 84, Welsh actor (Crossroads, Doctor Who, General Hospital).
  - Dick Taverne, 97, British politician, MP (1962–1974) and member of the House of Lords (1996–2025).
- 26 October – Tom Edwards, 80, British radio presenter (Radio City, Radio Caroline, BBC Radio 1), cancer. (death announced on this date)
- 27 October
  - Marvin Brown, 42, English footballer (Bristol City, Weston-super-Mare, Salisbury City), bile duct cancer.
  - Prunella Scales, 93, English actress (Fawlty Towers, A Question of Attribution, Howards End).
- 30 October
  - Peter Watkins, 90, English filmmaker (The War Game, Punishment Park, Resan).
  - Alan Vest, 86, English-born New Zealand football player (Perth Azzurri, New Zealand national team) and manager (Sarawak FA).
- 31 October
  - Colin Addison, 85, English football player (Nottingham Forest, Sheffield United) and manager (Hereford United). (death announced on this date)
  - Willie Young, 73, Scottish footballer (Aberdeen, Arsenal, Nottingham Forest). (death announced on this date)

== November ==
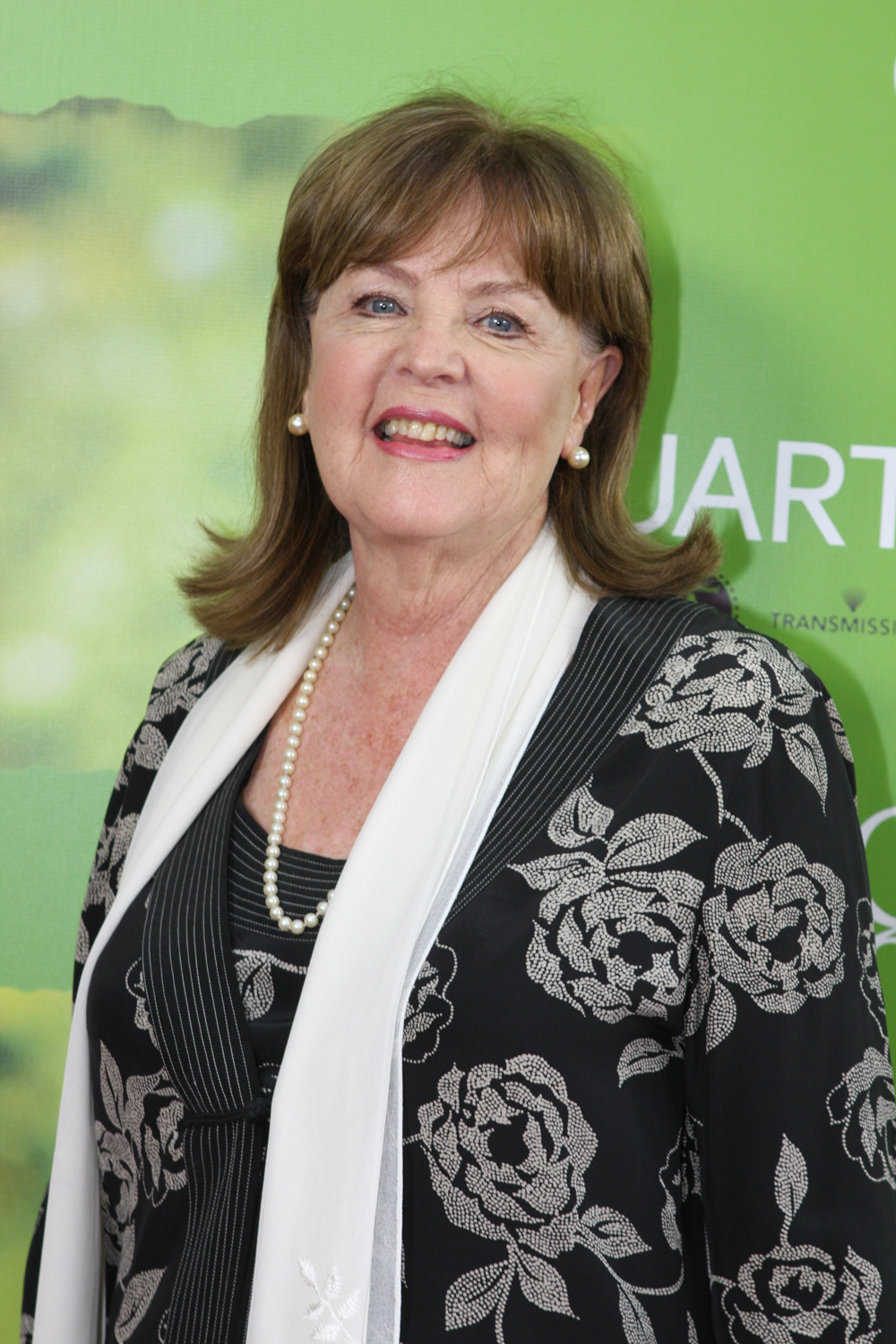
Pauline Collins in 2012

- 1 November
  - Archie Fisher, 86, Scottish folk singer and songwriter.
  - Elspeth King, 76, Scottish art curator.
- 2 November – Richard Gott, 87, British journalist (The Guardian).
- 3 November
  - David Gow, 80, British journalist (The Guardian), heart attack.
  - John Marshall, 85, British politician, MEP (1979–1989) and MP (1987–1997).
  - Richard Sharp, 87, English rugby union player (Barbarians, national team, British & Irish Lions).
- 4 November – Stuart Boam, 77, English football player (Mansfield Town, Middlesbrough, Newcastle United) and manager. (death announced on this date)
- 5 November
  - Pauline Collins, 85, English actress (Shirley Valentine, Upstairs, Downstairs, Doctor Who), complications from Parkinson's disease.
  - Gilson Lavis, 74, English drummer (Squeeze, Jools Holland and his Rhythm & Blues Orchestra).
- 6 November
  - Chris Bradley, British bass guitarist (Savage).
  - Don Robinson, 91, British football team owner (Scarborough, Hull City) and professional wrestler.
- 7 November – Peter Wright, 79, British engineer (Lotus 79). (death announced on this date)
- 8 November – Quentin Willson, 68, English television presenter (Britain's Worst Driver, Top Gear, Fifth Gear) and motoring journalist, lung cancer.
- 10 November
  - Richard Darbyshire, 65, English singer and songwriter (Living in a Box).
  - Barry Knight, 87, English cricketer (Essex, Leicestershire, national team).
- 11 November
  - Susanna Gross, English journalist and bridge player.
  - Helen Newlove, Baroness Newlove, 63, British community reform activist, member of the House of Lords (since 2010).
- 13 November
  - Marina Lewycka, 79, Ukrainian-British writer.
  - Fabian Monds, 85, Northern Irish broadcasting executive, governor of BBC Northern Ireland.
- 14 November – Rachel Cooke, 56, British journalist (The Observer) and writer, cancer.
- 15 November –
  - Rod Thomas, 78, Welsh footballer (Swindon Town, Cardiff City, national team).
  - David Rock, 96, English architect and artist
- 16 November –
  - Charlotte Bingham, 83, British author.
  - Mark Kaylor, 64, British Olympic boxer (1980). (death announced on this date)
- 16 November – Mark Fisher, 81, British politician, minister for the arts (1997–1998) and MP (1983–2010).
- 17 November – David Pryce-Jones, 89, British conservative commentator, author and historian.
- 20 November
  - Neil French, 81, British advertising executive.
  - Ruth Kiew, 79, British botanist.
  - Mani, 63, English rock bassist (The Stone Roses, Primal Scream).
- 21 November – Roly Howard, 90, English football manager (Marine).
- 24 November
  - Jill Freud, 98, British actress (Torchy the Battery Boy, Love Actually), inspiration for Lucy Pevensie. (death announced on this date)
  - Thomas McMahon, 89, English Roman Catholic prelate, bishop of Brentwood (1980–2014).
  - Jack Shepherd, 85, English actor (Wycliffe, Bill Brand, Wonderland).
- 25 November
  - Johnny Newman, 91, English football player (Plymouth, Exeter) and manager (Grimsby). (death announced on this date)
  - Mike Watkins, 73, Welsh rugby union player (Cardiff, Newport, national team). (death announced on this date)
- 26 November
  - Pam Hogg, 66, Scottish fashion designer.
  - Tommy Murray, 82, Scottish footballer (Carlisle United, Heart of Midlothian, Airdrieonians).
  - Les O'Neill, 81, English football player (Darlington, Carlisle United) and manager (Workington).
- 27 November – Peter Whittle, 64, British politician, member of the London Assembly (2016–2021), cancer.
- 28 November – Imran Sherwani, 63, British field hockey player, Olympic champion (1988), complications from Alzheimer's disease.
- 29 November – Sir Tom Stoppard, 88, Czech-born British playwright (Rosencrantz and Guildenstern Are Dead) and screenwriter (Shakespeare in Love, Empire of the Sun), five-time Tony winner. (death announced on this date)
- 30 November
  - Billy Bonds, 79, English footballer (West Ham United, Charlton Athletic).
  - Brian Hayes, 87, Australian-born British broadcaster.

== December ==
- 1 December
  - Denis Durnian, 75, English golfer. (death announced on this date)
  - Luci Shaw, 96, British-American poet and essayist.
  - Uthopia, 24, British dressage horse, Olympic champion (2012), euthanised. (death announced on this date)
  - Valegro, 23, British dressage horse, Olympic champion (2012), euthanised. (death announced on this date)
- 2 December
  - Marvin Hinton, 85, English footballer (Charlton Athletic, Chelsea).
  - Sir Alec Reed, 91, British recruitment executive and philanthropist, founder of Reed and The Big Give.
- 3 December – Brian Havelock, 83, British motorcycle speedway rider.
- 6 December
  - Martin Parr, 73, British photographer and photojournalist, cancer.
  - Bill Sutton, 81, British-born New Zealand politician, MP (1984–1990).
- 7 December – Nala, 5–6, station cat.
- 8 December – Kate Allsop, 71, British politician, mayor of Mansfield (2015–2019). (death announced on this date)
- 9 December
  - David Best, 82, English footballer (Bournemouth, Ipswich, Oldham). (death announced on this date)
  - Dixie Deans, 79, Scottish footballer (Motherwell, Celtic, national team).
- 10 December – Sophie Kinsella (aka Madeleine Wickham), 55, English novelist (Shopaholic, Can You Keep a Secret?, The Undomestic Goddess), glioblastoma.
- 11 December
  - Stanley Baxter, 99, Scottish actor (Crooks Anonymous, Very Important Person) and comedian (The Stanley Baxter Show), BAFTA winner (1961).
  - Stan Brookes, 72, English footballer (Doncaster Rovers).
  - John Carey, 91, British literary critic.
  - Ceal Floyer, 57, Pakistani-born British visual artist.
  - Joanna Trollope, 82, English novelist (A Village Affair).
- 13 December – Gary Rowell, 68, English footballer (Sunderland, Middlesbrough, Burnley) and newspaper columnist, leukaemia.
- 14 December – Shân Legge-Bourke, 82, Welsh landowner.
- 17 December
  - Ruth Bourne, 99, British codebreaker and World War II veteran.
  - Sir Humphrey Burton, 94, British television (Aquarius) and radio presenter.
  - Max Eider, British guitarist (The Jazz Butcher) and songwriter. (death announced on this date)
  - David Heathcote, 94, British artist, collector and academic. (death announced on this date)
  - Sir Patrick McNair-Wilson, 96, English politician, MP (1964–1966, 1968–1997). (death announced on this date)
  - Antony Price, 80, English fashion designer. (death announced on this date)
  - William Rush, 31, actor (Waterloo Road, Grange Hill, Coronation Street), contestant (The X Factor), musician.
- 19 December
  - Mick Abrahams, 82, English guitarist and singer (Jethro Tull, Blodwyn Pig).
  - Lorraine Cheshire, 65, English actress (Trollied, Ackley Bridge, The Imaginarium of Doctor Parnassus).
- 20 December – Henry Moore, 102, English Anglican clergyman, bishop of Cyprus and the Gulf (1981–1986). (death announced on this date)
- 21 December – Anne Madden, 93, English-born Irish painter.
- 22 December
  - John P. Connolly, 75, English businessman.
  - Richard Cramb, 62, Scottish rugby union player (Harlequins, London Scottish, national team), cancer.
  - Jonathan Hawkins, 42, English chess grandmaster.
  - Chris Rea, 74, singer and guitarist.
  - Robin Turner, 70, English footballer (Ipswich Town, Swansea City). (death announced on this date)
- 23 December
  - Allan Gilliver, 81, English footballer (Bradford City, Brighton & Hove Albion, Lincoln City), complications from dementia.
  - Jimmy Miller, 72, Scottish footballer (Morton, Motherwell, Queen of the South). (death announced on this date)
- 24 December
  - Perry Bamonte, 65, English Hall of Fame rock musician (The Cure, Love Amongst Ruin).
  - Manjula Sood, 80, Indian-born British politician, lord mayor of Leicester (2008–2009).
  - Ken White, 82, English muralist and illustrator.
- 25 December – John Robertson, 72, Scottish footballer (Nottingham Forest, national team).
- 26 December – Stewart Francis, 74, British radio executive and broadcaster (LBC, Independent Local Radio), cancer.
- 28 December
  - Tony Bond, 72, English rugby union player (Broughton Park, Sale, national team). (death announced on this date)
  - Hugh Morris, 62, Welsh cricketer (Glamorgan, England national team). (death announced on this date)
- 29 December – Gordon Jones, 82, English footballer (Middlesbrough, Darlington).
- 30 December – Joe Byrne, 72, Northern Ireland politician, MLA (1998–2003, 2011–2015).
- 31 December – Mary Bradley, 83, Northern Irish politician, MLA (2003–2011). (death announced on this date)
