= Phythian =

Phythian is an English surname of Roman origin meaning "son of Fithion" or Vivian. Notable people with the surname include:

- Charles Phythian-Adams (1937–2025), English local historian
- Dylan Phythian (born 1995), Australian rugby league footballer
- Ernie Phythian (1942–2020), English football player
- Mark Phythian (born 1985), English cricket player
- Robert L. Phythian (1835–1917), American naval officer
