= Neil French =

Neil French may refer to:

- Neil French (businessman) (1944–2025), British advertising executive
- Neil French (cricketer) (1964–2025), English cricketer
- Neil French (horseman) in Bing Crosby Stakes
