= Brian Wade =

British murderer (1945–2025)

- Born: 16 May 1945
- Died: 9 August 2025 (aged 80); HM Prison Long Lartin, Worcestershire, England
- Status: Deceased
- Conviction: Manslaughter
- Criminal charges: Grievous bodily harm
- Penalty: 3 life sentences

Details
- Victims: 3
- Date: 1966, 1998, 2023
- Country: England
- Targets: Edwin Percy Cardwell; Johnathan Abell
- Killed: 2
- Injured: 1
- Weapons: Sledgehammer; machete
- Imprisoned at: HM Prison Guys Marsh (formerly); HM Prison Long Lartin

Brian Wade (16 May 1945 – 9 August 2025) was a British convicted murderer. A prolific offender, he was convicted of serious violent crimes across six decades.

== Biography ==
On 16 July 1966, Brian Wade killed Edwin Percy Cardwell in Rotherham, South Yorkshire. He was a 21-year-old neighbour who was bludgeoned to death with a sledgehammer. In 1972, he received a section 18 order for wounding with intent. Wade was eventually released and in 1998 he killed 22-year-old Johnathan Abell in Nottingham in what was described as a "grisly machete slaughter". For this crime he was convicted of manslaughter.

By 2020, Wade was still serving in prison. In 2023, he slit the throat of a fellow inmate at HM Prison Guys Marsh in Dorset. The man was found tied up for a “bondage” session following the attack. The man only survived because of intervention from prison staff. For this crime he received a third life sentence. On 2 September 2025, it was reported that Wade had died at HM Prison Long Lartin in Worcestershire on 9 August.
