= 1961 Society of Film and Television Arts Television Awards =

UK television awards ceremony

Society of Film and Television Arts Television Awards
- Date: 1961

Highlights
- Best Actor: Lee Montague
- Best Actress: Billie Whitelaw

The 1961 Society of Film and Television Arts Television Awards, the United Kingdom's premier television awards ceremony. The awards later became known as the British Academy Television Awards, under which name they are still given.

== Winners ==
- Actor
  - Lee Montague
- Actress
  - Billie Whitelaw
- Current Events
  - Sportsview unit (BBC)
- Designer
  - Fred Pusey
- Desmond Davis Award for Services to Television
  - Richard Dimbleby
- Drama Production
  - Peter Dews
- Factual
  - Michael Redington
- Light Entertainment
  - James Gilbert
- Light Entertainment (Artist)
  - Stanley Baxter
- Personality
  - Eamonn Andrews
- Scriptwriter
  - Alun Owen
- Writers Award
  - Alun Owen
