= Donald Rose =

English supercentenarian (1914–2025)

- Born: Donald Kitchener Rose; 24 December 1914; Westcott, Surrey, England
- Died: 11 July 2025 (aged 110 years, 199 days); Ilkeston, Derbyshire, England
- Occupation: Labourer
- Spouse: Jeannette Rudin (m. 1946; died 2001)
- Children: 1
- Military career
- Allegiance: United Kingdom
- Branch: British Army
- Service years: 1939–1945
- Rank: Private
- Unit: Queen's Royal Regiment (West Surrey)
- Conflicts: Second World War

Donald Kitchener Rose (24 December 1914 – 11 July 2025) was an English supercentenarian and the oldest living World War II veteran at the time of his death. Following the death of John Tinniswood on 25 November 2024, Rose became the oldest living man in the United Kingdom.

== Biography ==
Rose was born in Westcott, Surrey, England, on 24 December 1914. He married Jeannette "Janet" Rudin in Surrey in October 1946. The marriage produced one child. He was widowed in February 2001, after 54 years of marriage.

On Rose's 110th birthday, Christmas Eve 2024, Alfie Boe sang "Happy Birthday to You" to him via video call and he received a birthday card from Buckingham Palace. Rose appeared on The One Show VE Day 80th anniversary special, broadcast on 5 May 2025.

== War Service ==
Rose enlisted in the British Army in 1940, aged 25, joining the Territorial Army component of the Queen's Royal Regiment (West Surrey) and trained in Guildford.

=== North African Campaign (1942) ===
From early 1942, Rose served with the 7th Armoured Division, better known as the Desert Rats, as part of the British Eighth Army. He saw action in several engagements during the North African campaign, including:

- El Alamein
- Medenine
- Tripoli
- Tunis

=== Allied Invasion of Italy – Salerno (September 1943) ===
In September 1943, Rose and his battalion landed at Salerno, Italy, as part of the Allied invasion of Italy. By October, they returned to England to prepare for the Western Europe campaign.

=== Normandy and Northwest Europe (June 1944 – 1945) ===
Rose arrived on the Normandy Beaches on 9 June 1944 (D+3), as part of operations including Operation Goodwood and the breakout through France. His Battalion advanced through, Belgium, South Holland, the Netherlands, and finally into Germany. He suffered a minor leg wound in Normandy but returned to active duty.

=== Liberation of Bergen-Belsen (April 1945) ===
In April 1945, Rose was part of the division that liberated the Bergen-Belsen concentration camp in northern Germany.

=== Medal ribbons and awards ===
Rose was awarded campaign medals for North Africa, Italy, and Northwest Europe, and in 2025 received the Légion d’honneur from France.

On 30 May 2025, Rose was awarded the Freedom of the Borough of Erewash, presented by the Mayor, Harry Atkinson.

== Death and funeral ==
Rose died at the Care Vue Care Home in Ilkeston, Derbyshire, on 11 July 2025, aged 110 years and 199 days. His death made Hugh Munro Kerr (born 9 October 1915) the oldest living man in the United Kingdom.

On 21 July 2025, Member of Parliament for Erewash Adam Thompson paid tribute to Rose during a debate commemorating the 80th anniversary of VJ Day. Thompson's contribution, in which he described Rose as a hero, was later echoed in the same debate by Defence Minister Luke Pollard and Shadow Defence Secretary James Cartlidge.

His funeral was held on 8 August 2025 and was attended by hundreds of mourners. The hearse was escorted by more than 100 motorcycles to Ilkeston Town’s football ground, where the service took place, concluding with a salute by military personnel and veterans at the town’s cenotaph. John Wallace, a parade marshal for the Derbyshire Royal British Legion, stated that Rose had a strong interest in motorbikes, describing the escort as "a fitting tribute to his life and generation".

=== Erewash mural ===
On 21 October 2026 a mural honouring Rose on the side of Erewash Borough Council town hall was completed. Councillor Mark Alfrey, lead member for environment, said it was a "beautiful way to honour Donald". Painted by street artist Neil Keating and John Culshaw, the mural was completed ahead of the 774th Ilkeston Charter Fair.
