= David Boyle (author) =

British politician (1958–2025)

David Courtney Boyle
- Born: 20 May 1958
- Died: 20 June 2025 (aged 67)
- Occupations: Author, journalist, policy director, co-director, editor
- Employer(s): Radix, New Weather Institute, NESTA, New Economics Foundation
- Organization(s): Radix, New Weather Institute, Time Banking UK
- Known for: Non-fiction publications; Independent review for the Treasury and the Cabinet Office; Campaign against Southern Rail
- Notable work: Authenticity, The Tyranny of Numbers, The Sum of Our Discontent, Funny Money, Cancelled!, Blondel's Song, The Troubadour's Song, Toward the Setting Sun, Eminent Corporations, Broke
- Political party: Liberal Democrats
- Awards: Lib Dem Blogger of the Year 2013

David Courtney Boyle (20 May 1958 – 20 June 2025) was a British author and journalist who wrote mainly about history and new ideas in economics, money, business, and culture. He lived in Steyning, West Sussex, England.

Boyle conducted an independent review for the Treasury and the Cabinet Office on public demand for choice in public services which reported in 2013. Boyle was a co-founder and policy director of Radix, which he characterized in 2017 as a radical centrist think tank. He was also co-director of the mutual think tank New Weather Institute.

== Writing ==
Boyle's book Authenticity put the phenomenon on the business and political agenda. His previous books The Tyranny of Numbers and The Sum of Our Discontent predicted and fermented the backlash against target culture. Funny Money helped launched the time banks movement in the UK. Later on, his writing suggested why organisations and public services could be ineffective. He worked with the New Economics Foundation and NESTA on a series of publications about coproduction. His solutions were also published in The Human Element, in which he argued that organisations had abandoned human skills in favour of numerical targets or IT systems, which frustrated the business of building relationships and making things happen. He helped to launch the popular campaign against the failures of the Southern Rail franchise with his book Cancelled!, and his experimental 'passenger strike' in 2017.

His history books usually had a business or economic dimension, including Blondel's Song (UK) and The Troubadour's Song (USA) about the imprisonment and ransom of Richard the Lionheart. His 2008 book Toward the Setting Sun told the intertwined story of Christopher Columbus, John Cabot and Amerigo Vespucci and their race for America in the 1490s. His 2010 book, Eminent Corporations (with Andrew Simms) introduced a new genre, the mini-corporate biography, launching the idea of corporate history as tragedy. His 2013 book Broke argued that the middle classes were also being squeezed by the political and economic elite.

Boyle was the editor of several non-peer-reviewed journals including New Economics and Town & Country Planning. He was a fellow of the New Economics Foundation.

He was editor of the weekly Liberal Democrat News from 1992 to 1998. He edited the Foundation's publications New Economics, News from the New Economy, and then Radical Economics from 1987 to 2010.

== Other work ==
Boyle was involved with developing coproduction and introducing time banks to Britain as part of public service reform, developing the idea of coproduction with the innovation agency Nesta. He was involved in the Clone Town Britain campaign and wrote about the future of volunteering, cities and business.

Boyle helped found the London Time Bank, and was co-founder of Time Banking UK. He was a candidate for Parliament of the United Kingdom, and sat on the federal policy committee of the Liberal Democrats from 1998 to 2012. He was Lib Dem Blogger of the Year 2013.

== Death ==
Boyle died on 20 June 2025, at the age of 67.

== Bibliography ==
- Building Futures, 1989
- What is New Economics?, 1993
- Alternative Identities, Alternative Currencies, 1999
- Funny Money: In search of alternative cash, 1999 (ISBN 0-00-653067-2)
- The Sum of Our Discontent, 2001
- The Tyranny of Numbers, 2001 ISBN 0-00-653199-7
- The Little Money Book, 2003 (ISBN 1-901970-51-5)
- The Money Changers: Currency Reform from Aristotle to e-cash, 2003
- Numbers, 2004 (ISBN 0-9543959-2-1)
- Authenticity: Brands, Fakes, Spin and the Lust for Real Life, 2004 (ISBN 0-00-717964-2)
- The Troubadour's Song: The Capture and Ransom of Richard the Lionheart, 2005 (ISBN 0-670-91486-X)
- Blondel's Song: The Capture, Imprisonment and Ransom of Richard the Lionheart, 2005 (ISBN 978-0-141-01597-2)
- Leaves the World to Darkness 2007 (ISBN 978-0-9552263-0-4)
- Toward the Setting Sun: Columbus, Cabot and Vespucci and the Race for America 2008 (ISBN 978-0-8027-1651-4)
- Co-production: A manifesto for growing the core economy 2008 (ISBN 978-1-904882-32-9)
- The New Economics: A Bigger Picture with Andrew Simms (2009) Routledge ISBN 978-1844076758
- Money Matters (2009) ISBN 978-1-906136-20-8
- The Wizard (2010) ISBN 978-0-9552263-1-1
- Eminent Corporations with Andrew Simms (2010) ISBN 978-1849010498
- Voyages of Discovery (2011) ISBN 9780500289594
- The Human Element: Ten new rules to kickstart our failing organizations 2011 (ISBN 978-1849714495)
- Broke: Who Killed the Middle Classes? (2013) Fourth Estate ISBN 978-0007491032
- The Age to Come. Authenticity, Postmodernism and How to Survive What Comes Next (2013)
- How to be English Square Peg (2015) 978-0224100977
- Alan Turing: Unlocking the Enigma Endeavour Press/Real Press (2015) 978-1500985370
