= HM Prison Guys Marsh =

Men's prison in Dorset, England

Coordinates: 50.9848°N 2.2197°W

HMP Guys Marsh
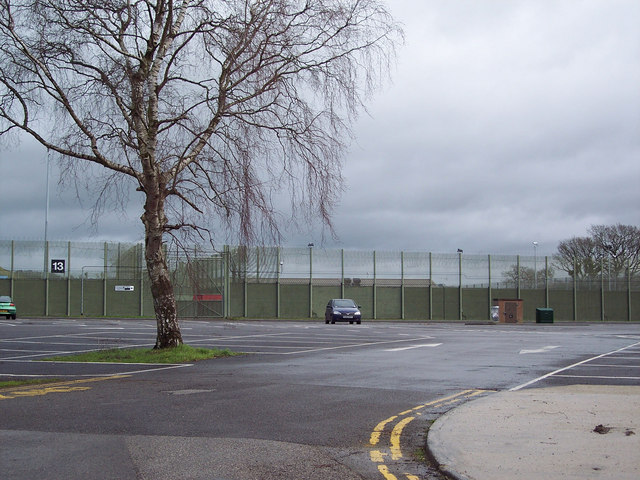
- Main gate of Guys Marsh Prison
- Interactive map of HMP Guys Marsh
- Location: Shaftesbury, Dorset
- Security class: Adult Male/Category C
- Population: 507 (May 2024)
- Opened: 1960
- Managed by: HM Prison Services
- Governor: Niall Bryant
- Website: Guys Marsh at justice.gov.uk

HM Prison Guys Marsh is a Category C men's prison, located near Shaftesbury, Dorset, England. Guys Marsh is operated by His Majesty's Prison Service.

== History ==
Guys Marsh was a former US Military Hospital. In 1960 it opened as a borstal (HM Borstal Guys Marsh). The buildings were standard World War II Nissen huts, and the only buildings that had been added were the officers' quarters (around 50 houses) and the boiler house. The borstal continued in the buildings until the 1980s, when gradually the structures of the building were rebuilt or refurbished. In 1984, Guys Marsh became a Young Offender Institution. In 1992, it began also housing adult prisoners when the building of a perimeter fence made it a closed establishment. Guys Marsh soon became an all-adult prison, and within 18 months the gaol managed to increase its operating capacity by 69.

In January 2002, the Board of Visitors criticised Guys Marsh prison failing to meet government standards on re-offending rates amongst released prisoners. The board blamed a shortage of staff and shortage of money for poor facilities at the jail. The Board also expressed concern over medical care, after a local GP' practice withdrew its services from the prison.

In March 2017, a wing of the prison had to be evacuated when a prisoner climbed onto the roof and started a fire there.

== The prison today ==
Accommodation at Guys Marsh comprises seven residential units, which have cellular accommodation and one unit has less secure rooms.

Guys Marsh offers workshops to prisoners including Farms and Estates Management, Laundry, Industrial Cleaning, Bricklaying and a number of contract production workshops. Some of the workshops run recognised external qualifications.

A Visitor Centre is available at the prison, with facilities including toilets and a baby changing room.

When Guys Marsh was inspected in 2014 it was found prison officers had, "all but lost control". The prison was described as in crisis and gangs operated openly. Spice and alcohol related violence was high and prisoners lived in fear. Prisoners are afraid to leave their cells sometimes for months at a time. Prisoners are inadequately supervised, prisoners push ahead in dinner and medicine queues, walk around in shorts or dressing gowns and smoke unchallenged by staff. Bullying has become so widespread one wing is reserved for prisoners who fear for their safety. Peter Clarke, the chief inspector, said the 2014 inspection found the prison in crisis “where managers and staff had all but lost control”. The prison got six months’ notice of the inspectors’ decision to return in December 2016, inspectors found not enough had been done too late about their worries, and the prison was worse in some respects.
