= Meirion Roberts =

Welsh rugby union player (1934–2025)

- Full name: Hugh Meirion Roberts
- Born: 11 September 1934 Abergwyngregyn, Wales
- Died: 6 January 2025 (aged 90)
- School: Cardiff High School

Rugby union career
- Position: Centre
International career
Years	Team	Apps	(Points)
1960–63	Wales	8	(0)

Hugh Meirion Roberts (11 September 1934 – 6 January 2025) was a Welsh international rugby union player.

Born in Abergwyngregyn in the north of Wales, Roberts moved to Cardiff in his youth and learned his rugby at Cardiff High School, winning Welsh Schools representative honours. He was a Welsh trialist while playing for Cardiff HSOB.

Roberts, who captained Cardiff, was capped eight times as a centre by Wales during the early 1960s. He debuted against the Springboks at Cardiff in 1960 and took part in three Five Nations campaigns, gaining eight total caps.

Roberts died on 6 January 2025, at the age of 90.

== See also ==
- List of Wales national rugby union players
