= William Taylor (judge) =

British judge (1944–2025)

- Born: 27 July 1944
- Died: 19 March 2025 (aged 80)
- Occupations: Barrister; Judge; University Chairman
- Years active: 1968–2014
- Title: His Honour

William Taylor (27 July 1944 – 19 March 2025) was a British judge who was Circuit Judge for the City of Plymouth, Chairman of the Board of Trustees at Hamoaze House in Plymouth, and served on the board of the University of Plymouth.

== Career ==
=== 1968–1990: Early Years ===
Taylor was "called to the bar" by the Inner Temple in 1968, which authorised him to begin work as a barrister.

In June 1979, Taylor defended Maria Kristina Coppel, a 23 year old Swedish medical student, who had been arrested for attempting to smuggle drugs into the UK on behalf of Guru Bhagwan Shree Rajneesh. The technique of brainwashing her and other female followers of the sect, which emerged during the court proceedings, ultimately led to the Guru's expulsion from India. Coppel received a suspended sentence.

Taylor was counsel for Nicholas Price, who was jailed for life for the murder of his three-year-old stepdaughter, Heidi Koseda, who starved to death in a locked room in Hillingdon, West London in 1984. The case prompted an overhaul of child care services after an independent inquiry criticized the National Society for the Prevention of Cruelty to Children for failing to act.

In 1986, Taylor was counsel for the defence during the trial of gangster-turned-state witness Francesco Di Carlo, the former head of the Mafia's British operations.

Another defendant he represented, Anton Johnson, was charged with stealing money from Southend United F.C., of which he was Chairman. Johnson was acquitted despite the prosecution calling Bobby Moore, former captain of England's World Cup side of 1966.

In 1988, Taylor defended Barry Terry, a senior Customs Officer charged with corruption and the smuggling of gold coins into the UK. Terry's conviction was overturned on appeal.

=== 1990–2006: Judgeship ===
In 1990, Taylor became a Judge.

On 31 July 1998, Taylor sentenced a number of unnamed defendants to a total of 100 years imprisonment for the serial sexual abuse of their children and grandchildren over a 35 year period. The case was described as being akin to the high profile case of Fred West and Rosemary West.

In March 2003, Taylor jailed drug baron Robert Stoneman for 18 years for "conspiracy to supply heroin" alongside a number of sex abuse charges, and attempt to pervert the course of justice.

In 2004, Taylor presided over the trial of Britain's most prolific paedophile, William Goad, at Plymouth Crown Court. Taylor sentenced Goad to life imprisonment for two charges of indecent assault and 14 counts of rape.

In 2004, Taylor was appointed the Honorary Recorder of Plymouth by the City Council for life, in recognition of his long-standing fight against drugs and his campaign for a safer city, and he continued to play a significant role in the City's activities as its second citizen until his death. From 2004-2015, Taylor was patron of "12s Company", a charity specialising in the counselling of victims of sexual abuse, particularly those of William Goad.

In 2005, Taylor received an honorary doctorate in Law from the University of Plymouth.

Taylor retired from the bench in 2006 on health grounds.

=== 2012–2014: University of Plymouth ===
In 2012, Taylor was appointed to the role of Chairman of the Board of Directors at the University of Plymouth.

In July 2014, Taylor suspended Wendy Purcell, the University's vice-chancellor, following complaints about her conduct. Wendy Purcell ceased employment at Plymouth University from 31 December 2015. Taylor stepped down from the University Board in September 2014 follow allegations made against Taylor that he had sexually harassed female students and members of staff, which he denied. Purcell was later re-employed and appointed to a newly created role of president with compensation for loss of office.
