= Maisie Trollette =

British drag queen (1933–2025)

- Trollette in 2013
- Born: David Raven; 15 August 1933; St Ives, Cornwall, England
- Died: 12 March 2025 (aged 91); Brighton, England
- Occupation: Drag queen
- Partner: Don Coull
- Dancing career
- Former groups: The Trollettes

David Raven (15 August 1933 – 12 March 2025), better known by the stage name Maisie Trollette, was a British drag queen who was active for more than 50 years. One of the oldest working drag queens in the world, she was a regular feature of Brighton Pride from 1973.

== Background ==
Raven was born in St Ives, Cornwall, on 15 August 1933, and he was raised by his adoptive family in Suffolk. He trained as a grocer and then as a publican and waiter and at Gorleston Super Holiday Camp in Great Yarmouth, where he bumped into show-business personalities like Lonnie Donegan and Matt Monro. He came out when he was 26 and moved to London in 1960. He later met James Court, with whom he started experimenting with drag. As a duo, they won a talent competition at The Black Cap in Camden Town.

In the 1960s, Raven met his life partner, banker Don Coull, and it was Coull who suggested that he glam up a bit. Raven initially rejected the suggestion, and Coull then said that he and Court looked like a pair of trolls. David thus fashioned the surname Trollette by combining troll with the diminutive suffix -ette. From then on, his act with Court became known as "Maisie and Jimmy Trollette".

== Early career ==
The Trollettes became regulars on the London drag scene in the 1960s. They sang live rather than miming to backing tracks, as was customary at the time. The Trollettes frequently performed at the Royal Vauxhall Tavern in Vauxhall.

The theatrical side of entertaining had always interested Maisie, and she landed roles in touring productions of both The Boys in the Band and One Flew Over the Cuckoo's Nest.

Maisie and Jimmy performed in pantomime as the ugly sisters at the Theatre Royal in Brighton. While there, she and Coull fell in love with the South Coast city and its liberal, gay-friendly atmosphere. With the help of their pools winnings, they bought a guesthouse on St George's Terrace in the late 1970s.

== Move to Brighton ==
After moving to Brighton, Maisie became a fixture of Brighton Pride. She was a part of the event from 1973, when it was held for the first time.

Although in later years she sat on a stool to deliver show tunes, such as "There's No Business Like Show Business" and "Anything Goes", her act remained mostly unchanged in format.

In 2018, to celebrate Maisie's 85th Birthday, Darcelle XV, then the world's oldest working drag queen, flew from the US to meet Maisie in Brighton at Legend's Bar. The meeting appears in Maisie, a documentary on Maisie's life.

Maisie Trollette died at a Brighton care home on 12 March 2025 at the age of 91.

== Filmography ==
Year	Title	Role	Notes	Ref.
2021	Maisie	Herself	Available on Amazon Video	
