= The Sum of Our Discontent =

2001 book by David Boyle

- First edition
- Author: David Boyle
- Language: English
- Genre: Non-fiction
- Publisher: Texere
- Publication date: 2001

The Sum of Our Discontent is a nonfiction book by David Boyle. It was published by Texere in 2001. The tagline and theme of the book is "Why numbers make us irrational".

== Premise ==
The author's premise is that humans have been trying to improve the quality of life and happiness by using numbers to count an increasing amount of things, and while it has worked in many ways, it has also had a cost in sanitizing the representation of existence by trying to reduce everything to numbers, and has not often been very effective. This tension is very similar to the one described in the classic The Two Cultures and the Scientific Revolution of C. P. Snow.

== Synopsis ==
The first chapter is entitled "A Short History of Counting". It describes the progression of numbers from being considered divine in early history to their present-day pragmatism. It opens in 1904 Berlin with the story of a counting horse named Clever Hans, who was, to the relief of all, proved by psychologist Oskar Pfungst to not really be able to count. This fit in with the earlier opinion of Nicholas of Cusa, a cardinal who was a pioneer of quantification, that counting is what separates man from animals.

Boyle then covers the history of counting in detail, starting with when numbers were considered to be divine and were the exclusive domain of the accountant-priests of the Assyrian Empire, then going on to Pythagoras and the Ancient Greeks who believed numbers represented the harmony of nature. Legend has it that Pythagoras may have studied with the Magi and been influenced by them after having been held captive in Babylon. Even a later practical and scientific mathematician such as Heinrich Hertz agreed with this natural significance of numbers. Boyle then goes to the medieval fascination and obsession with clocks that are thought to have possibly been invented by Gerbert of Aurillac, a monk. The long and fascinating history of the abacus also turns up time and time again in counting history. Luca Pacioli's invention of double-entry accounting further brought us to the present day situation of numbers being used to measure everything.

The next chapters tell the stories of various historical figures and how they relate to the book's concept. They are all good stories; many of them focus on the unintended consequences of the ideas of their creators, specifically Thomas Malthus and John Maynard Keynes, who have both become known as measurers, but were really more interested in unmeasurable concepts. It all starts with eccentric Jeremy Bentham who tried to measure happiness, then progresses to his utilitarian followers John Stuart Mill and Thomas Malthus. One problem with counting that became evident from this era was that it gave no solutions or causality, just data. Next he describes the political self-esteem movement started by California politician John Vasconcellos in consultation with his friend Jack Canfield, author of the popular self-esteem self-help book Chicken Soup for the Soul. A lot of Vasconcellous' ideas came from the Esalen Institute in the mountains near Big Sur, where Abraham Maslow's hierarchy of human needs theory was popularized. Boyle then tells the interesting story of Frederick Winslow Taylor and his extremely number-oriented scientific management. He then covers the ethical investing fad, an attempt to measure by more than numbers that itself falls victim to counting irrationality. Next is the story of economist John Maynard Keynes.

The chapter on "New Indicators" describes attempts to replace GNP with broader measures such as the Index of Sustainable Economic Welfare (ISEW) that attempt to account for full environmental costs. That index was popularized in a 1994 article in The Atlantic Monthly by Clifford Cobb about his new Redefining Progress think tank. Hazel Henderson's 1981 book Politics for the Solar Age was responsible for sparking the creation of the Air Pollution Index, one of many quality of life measurements that are now proliferating. An interesting point is that such measurements are often most meaningful if created and made by the people who care about them.

The next chapter covers the story of Edgar S. Cahn who came up with the time dollar as an outgrowth of his battles with proponents of cost–benefit analysis but more importantly from his desire to make people feel valuable. The initial time dollar projects began in 1987 with a grant from the Robert Wood Johnson Foundation.

The book ends with a chapter named "The bottom line". Boyle summarizes how the practice of trying to measure everything (which used to go by the name pantometry but is now so common that the word has fallen out of use) can rob us of our humanity. Measuring is very necessary, but so is intuition and storytelling, which can often express points much better than numbers can. He thinks we should try to bridge the gap between the eastern and western view of numbers, which have been in conflict since Pythagoras. He ends with a relevant quote from Prince Charles from his millennium broadcast on the BBC. Boyle's bottom line is that measuring does not in itself improve anything.
