= Broke: Who Killed the Middle Classes? =

- First edition
- Author: David Boyle
- Language: English
- Subject: Economics
- Published: 2013 (Fourth Estate)
- Publication place: United Kingdom
- Media type: Hardcover
- Pages: 352
- ISBN: 978-0-007-49103-2

Broke: Who Killed the Middle Classes? is a 2013 book by David Boyle. It examines the living standards of the middle class in the United Kingdom, and concludes they are in steep decline, with opportunities once available to many now only available to a few. It then seeks to identify the policies and people responsible.
