= David Killick =

British stage and television actor (1938–2025)

David Killick (1938 – 4 July 2025) was a British stage and television actor.

== Life and career ==
Killick born in Edmonton, Middlesex in 1938. Throughout his 60 year career, he appeared in stage productions including The Merry Wives of Windsor, Macbeth, and Richard III. He was also known for television roles in A Touch of Frost, Midsomer Murders and The Crown. His voice acting was credited on Doctor Who: The Lost Stories among some other productions.

Killick died at St John’s Hospice, North London on 4 July 2025, at the age of 86 or 87.
