= Andria Hall =

English ballet dancer (1956–2025)

- Born: 1 November 1956; Grimsby, England
- Died: 26 February 2025 (aged 68)
- Occupation: Ballet dancer
- Years active: 1978-1991

Andria Hall (1 November 1956 – 26 February 2025) was an English ballet dancer, most known as the principal dancer of the London Festival Ballet from 1978 to 1991.

== Biography ==
Andria Hall was born in Grimsby in Lincolnshire. Andria Hall began her dance studies with Phyllis and Hilda Skinns, later training under Louise Brown. In 1974 she was signed by the London Festival Ballet, where she quickly rose through the ranks to be made a principal dancer in 1978. Her repertoire with the company at the London Coliseum included many of the great female roles, including Aurora in The Sleeping Beauty (Nureev), Juliet in Romeo and Juliet (Nureev;Ashton), Odette/Odile in Swan Lake (Makarova), Nikija in La Bayadère (Makarova), Swanilda in Coppélia (Schaufuss) and the eponymous title character in Cinderella (Stevenson), Giselle (Skeaping) and La Sylphide (Schaufuss). She danced with the company as a lead dancer also on tours to the Metropolitan Opera House and the Kennedy Center and as a guest star with the Royal Ballet of Flanders.

After retiring from the stage in 1991, she moved to Germany to work as ballet master at the Deutsche Oper Berlin, where she was also deputy ballet director from 1994 to 1997. From 1997 to 2007, she worked as a freelance teacher with some of Europe's major companies, including La Scala Theatre Ballet, the Dresden Ballet, the Prague National Theatre and the Northern Ballet. Finally, she returned to work for the English National Ballet as ballet master and assistant artistic director, a position she held until 2007.

On 31 March 2025, the English National Ballet reported that Hall had died.
