= David Heathcote =

British artist (1931–2025)

- Born: David Hunter Heathcote; 6 July 1931; London, England
- Died: 23 November 2025 (aged 94)
- Education: Canterbury College of Art; Slade School of Art
- Occupations: Artist; academic; collector

David Hunter Heathcote (6 July 1931 – 23 November 2025) was a British artist, collector and academic. During the 1960s and 1970s he assembled a significant collection of Hausa textiles, costume and leather-work, much of which is now in the British Museum.

== Life and career ==
David Hunter Heathcote was born in London on 6 July 1931. He studied at Canterbury College of Art and the Slade School of Art during the late 1950s. Heathcote then worked for twenty years in Zimbabwe and Nigeria, an experience that would contribute significantly to his creative output. He took up a teaching post in Zimbabwe in 1959 and had his first one-person show in Harare in 1967. From 1967 to 1979 he was Head of Art History at Ahmadu Bello University.

He returned to England and settled in Canterbury in 1979, working on his own paintings for several years. He then obtained a part-time post at Christ Church College, later becoming a Senior Lecturer in the Department of Art and Design. He retired from the college in 1996 but continued to practice as an artist.

Heathcote's PhD dissertation on The Embroidery of Hausa Dress is deposited in the archives of the School of Oriental and African Studies in London, along with other related material.

During the 1960s and 1970s, Heathcote was a major collector of Hausa artifacts, including textiles, costume and leatherwork. He also undertook ground-breaking research into Hausa costume, including the embroidery of Hausa dress. He mounted a full-scale Hausa exhibition at the Commonwealth Institute in 1976, writing the catalogue and creating a documentary film. The British Museum subsequently acquired many of the objects from the exhibition, which was also covered by the BBC's African Service. The British Museum's online catalogue lists some 391 objects associated with Heathcote.

Heathcote's artworks are in the Slade School of Art, the University of Kent and other public and private collections.

Heathcote died at the age of 94 on 23 November 2025.

== Exhibitions ==
Heathcote's work has been included in exhibitions starting with the 1958 Young Contemporaries touring exhibition.

- 2011 Beyond Horizons, GV Art, Chiltern Street, London (solo)
- 2013 Beyond Horizons, Beckel Odille Boïcos Gallery, Paris, with GV Art (solo)
- 2014 Numberless Islands, GV Art, Chiltern Street, London (solo)
- 2017 Travels in Arcadia, Norman Plastow Gallery, Wimbledon, with GV Art (solo)
