= Tim O'Donovan =

British monarchist (1932–2025)

- Born: 10 February 1932; Marylebone
- Died: 23 October 2025 (aged 93); Datchet
- Spouse: Veronica White (m. 1958)
- Children: 2

Timothy Charles Melville O'Donovan (10 February 1932 – 23 October 2025) was a British monarchist and Court Circular analyst.

== Life and work ==
O'Donovan was born in Marylebone, on 10 February 1932 to Major JCM O’Donovan. His first cousin Captain Ian Liddell, Coldstream Guards was awarded the Victoria Cross in 1945. He joined the Life Guards as a National Serviceman in 1950, serving in Germany and left in 1952. Since 1979, he recorded the public engagements of the British royal family. He compiled and published his research in annuals.

After retiring from insurance he became secretary of the Friends of St Georges’s taking members on trips all over the world and raising thousands for St George’s Chapel. He was also Captain of the Lay Stewards in the chapel.

He married Veronica White in 1958 and had two children Michael in 1962 and Richard in 1966 and an only grandchild Oliver.

O'Donovan died on 23 October 2025, at the age of 93 in Datchet.
