= David Gow (journalist) =

British journalist (1945–2025)

David Richard Gow (7 April 1945 – 3 November 2025) was a British journalist.

Gow was born in Edinburgh on 7 April 1945 to a Scottish father, Robin Gow, and an English mother, Eve Mumford. He grew up in York and was educated at Worcester College, Oxford, where he studied French and German.

In 1975, he contributed to the Red Paper on Scotland edited by Gordon Brown. Throughout his career, he worked for a number of publications, including as Germany correspondent for The Guardian. He co-founded the Sceptical Scot website.

Gow had an interest in European politics and was based in Bonn, Germany for the majority of his career. He was a committed Europhile.

Gow died from a heart attack on 3 November 2025 aged 80.
