= Neil French (businessman) =

British businessman (1944–2025)

- Born: Robert Neil Hyde French; 9 September 1944; Warwickshire, England
- Died: 20 November 2025 (aged 81); Mallorca, Spain
- Occupation: Advertising executive
- Employer(s): Ogilvy & Mather, WPP Group PLC

Robert Neil Hyde French (9 September 1944 – 20 November 2025) was a British advertising executive who started his career in Singapore in the 1970s. The recipient of over 500 awards, he is best known for having created ads for Kaminomoto Hair Tonic, Chivas Regal, and XO Beer. After a speech he gave was criticized as sexist, he resigned from his position as Worldwide Creative Director at WPP Group PLC in 2005.

== Career ==
Before pursuing advertising, French held a variety of jobs, including bullfighter, debt collector, and manager for Judas Priest.

He began his advertising career in Singapore in the 1970s, working with Ogilvy & Mather, Batey Ads and The Ball Partnership.

In 1987, French created two of his best known ads-- an ad for Kaminomoto Hair Tonic and a Chivas Regal ad depicting an unlabeled whiskey bottle with the slogan: "If you don't recognize it, you're probably not ready for it."

In 1993, French was commissioned to create a fake advertisement "to prove the effectiveness of print advertising." His advertisement, featured in The Straits Times, was for a fake beer called XO Beer. It was so effective that people tried to order it in bars and a local micro-brewery created a beer with the same name. The advertisement won three awards, including the Best of the Best, at the Media magazine 1993 Asian Advertising Awards.

Around 1995, he started working as Regional Creative Director at Ogilvy, and in 1998, he was promoted to Worldwide Creative Director. In 2003, Martin Sorrell made him Worldwide Creative Director at WPP Group PLC, then considered the second largest advertising group in the world. He was responsible for overseeing multiple firms, including Ogilvy & Mather, JWT, and Young & Rubicam.

=== Resignation from WPP ===
On 6 October 2005, French spoke at the "A Night with Nate French" event in Toronto. Allegedly, he responded to a question about the lack of women in advertising by stating that women are not good advertising executives and that they "will inevitably wimp out and go 'suckle something.'" Some attendees walked out or seemed uncomfortable. The remarks were criticized by some in the advertising industry, but others supported his comments. One attendee noted that French is "opinionated well beyond the realms of political correctness". His remarks were characterized as sexist.

In follow-up interviews, French defended his comments, saying: "You can't be a great creative director and have a baby and keep spending time off every time your kids are ill" and that if event attendees had "wanted Martin Luther King, they went to the wrong gig." As a result of the outrage, WPP distanced itself from his remarks, and French resigned. Additionally, his appearance as a speaker at the ADASIA05 conference was cancelled. Despite the controversy, he was recognized as "Champion of the CCA" at the Creative Circle Awards later that year.

In a 2009 interview in Agency.Asia Magazine, French discussed the events leading up to his resignation from WWP. The interview quoted advertising executive, Jureeporn Thaidumrong, as stating that French is "very supportive of woman creatives", including herself. That same year, he defended his comments in a speech and denied the version of his comments that had been quoted in the press.

=== Post-WPP ===
Around 2006, French founded an advertising award show, "The World Press Awards', which was limited to advertising that appears solely in print media.

In 2011, French published his memoirs, Sorry for the Lobsters, and was interviewed by AzurTv at Cannes Lions. Additionally, he served as chief judge for the Busan International Advertising Festival.

In 2015, French was awarded the Lotus Legend by ADFEST. The award is given "in honour of long-serving creative excellence in the region."

== Legacy and impact ==
French's advertising work has been called "innovative", and he is said to have transformed the advertising industry in Asia. He is known for his minimalist style. The book Cutting Edge Advertising: How to Create the World's Best Print for Brands in the 21st Century (1999) features his advice for crafting advertisements. Over his advertising career, he has received over 500 awards. He has been called "guru", "legend", and "godfather".

His positive opinion of "scam ads", ads made primarily for the purpose of winning awards at advertising festivals, is controversial in the advertising industry. Allegedly, he once told Piyush Pandey that scam ads are "the kind of stuff you needed to do to win awards internationally." He has also stated: "We are judging creativity here, not effectiveness." This view has been criticized as "irresponsible".

French resigned from his position as Worldwide Creative Director at WPP Group PLC after giving a speech that was criticized as sexist. His comments have subsequently been referenced in articles regarding the struggles that women face in advancing their careers.

== Personal life and death ==
French was born on a farm in Warwickshire, England, on 9 September 1944. A British citizen, he had an adopted son, Daniel.

French died from a stroke at the Joan March hospital in Mallorca, on 20 November 2025, at the age of 81.
