= Charles Phythian-Adams =

English historian (1937–2025)

Charles Vevers Phythian-Adams (28 July 1937 – 13 May 2025) was an English local historian and the head of the Centre for English Local History at the University of Leicester.

== Life and career ==
Phythian-Adams was born on 28 July 1937. Of a gentry family, he was the eldest of three sons of the Rev. William John Telia Phythian-Adams (1888–1967), DSO, MC, and Adela (née Robinson). He was educated at Marlborough College and Hertford College, Oxford, where he took an M.A.

Phythian-Adams died on 13 May 2025, at the age of 87.

== Selected publications ==
- Societies, Cultures and Kinship, 1580–1850: Cultural Provinces and English Local History
- Desolation of a City: Coventry and the Urban Crisis of the Late Middle Ages
- Re-thinking English Local History
- Land of the Cumbrians: A Study of British Provincial Origins, AD 400–1120
- The Norman Conquest of Leicestershire and Rutland
- Local History and Folklore: A New Framework
