= Nadine Apetz =

German boxer and neuroscientist (born 1986)

Personal information
- Born: 3 January 1986 (age 40) Haan, West Germany
- Height: 1.72 m (5 ft 7 1/2 in)
- Weight: Welterweight

Boxing career
Medal record
Women's amateur boxing
Representing Germany
World Championships
Bronze medal – third place	2016 Astana	Welterweight
Bronze medal – third place	2018 New Delhi	Welterweight
European Games
Bronze medal – third place	2019 Minsk	Welterweight
European Championships
Bronze medal – third place	2018 Sofia	Welterweight
EU Championships
Gold medal – first place	2017 Cascia	Welterweight

Nadine Apetz (born 3 January 1986) is a German neuroscientist and former amateur boxer. Competing principally in the women's welterweight division, she won bronze medals at the World Championships in 2016 and 2018. She took gold at the 2017 EU Championships, and bronze medals at the 2018 European Championships and 2019 European Games. In 2021, she became the first German woman to compete in boxing at the Olympic Games, losing in the round of 16 at Tokyo 2020.

Apetz began boxing while studying at the University of Bremen and combined her sporting career with research at the University of Cologne, where she completed a doctorate in 2022. Her thesis title was Modulation of Brain Activity and Networks by Deep Brain Stimulation of the Subthalamic Nucleus and L-DOPA Therapy in the 6-OHDA-Hemiparkinsonian Rat. She has also served as an athletes' representative and in sports administration.

== Early life ==
Nadine Apetz was born on 3 January 1986 in Haan, where she spent her childhood. Apetz studied biology at the University of Bremen and began boxing at the age of 21 through a university boxing course. Before taking up boxing, she participated in horse riding and tennis, but stopped after moving to Bremen because both sports were too expensive for her as a student. She initially boxed for fitness rather than with the intention of competing, but became increasingly involved in competition as her training progressed. Apetz won her first German national boxing championship in 2011.

After completing her bachelor's studies in biology, she spent almost three years in Australia while working on her master's degree thesis, and continued boxing there. In 2011, she graduated with a master's degree in neuroscience from the University of Bremen.

Apetz moved to Cologne in 2014 to train at the Olympic training centre and joined the SC Colonia 06 boxing club. She combined her training with academic work at the University Hospital of Cologne. She commenced a PhD degree in neuroscience at the University of Cologne in 2016.

== International boxing career ==
Apetz placed fifth at the 2011 Women's European Amateur Boxing Championships. She won a bronze medal at the 2016 AIBA Women's World Boxing Championships, having achieved unanimous points decisions over Meena Rani, Timea Nagy, and Naomi Graham before losing to the eventual champion Valentina Khalzova. She was the first German woman to win a World Championship boxing medal since the event's inception in 2001.

The women's welterweight division was not contested at the 2016 Summer Olympics, and Apetz considered ending her competitive career after being unable to pursue Olympic qualification in her normal weight division. She decided to continue after the women's Olympic boxing programme was expanded from three to five weight divisions for the 2020 Tokyo Games.

At the 2017 Women's European Union Amateur Boxing Championships she won the gold medal, by eliminating Sandy Ryan, Gráinne Walsh and, in the final, Hanna Solecka. The next year, at the Women's European Amateur Boxing Championships in Sofia, Apetz won a bronze medal in the welterweight division, losing to Yaroslava Yakushina in the semi-final. At the 2018 AIBA Women's World Boxing Championships in New Delhi, she defeated Alcinda Panguana 5–0 and Yakushina 4–0 before losing 4–1 to Gu Hong in the semi-final, giving her a second World Championship bronze medal.

Apetz reached the women's welterweight semi-final at the 2019 European Games in Minsk, where she lost to Italy's Assunta Canfora and received the bronze medal. She was seeded second for the 2019 AIBA Women's World Boxing Championships in Ulan-Ude, but lost her opening bout to Russia's Saadat Dalgatova by a 5–0 points decision. By that year, she had won six German national championships. As of 2019, her boxing trainer was Lukas Wilaschek.

In December 2020, Apetz won the 69 kg competition at the Cologne Boxing World Cup, defeating Ukraine's Anna Lysenko 5–0 in the semi-final and Leonie Müller 5–0 in the final.

== Tokyo 2020 and later career ==
The European Olympic qualification tournament for the Tokyo Olympic Games began in London in March 2020 but was suspended after several competition days because of the COVID-19 pandemic, and resumed in Villebon-sur-Yvette in June 2021. The postponement of the Olympic Games also delayed Apetz's doctoral work, which she had planned to complete after the originally scheduled 2020 Games. Apetz defeated Poland's Karolina Koszewska by a 4–1 points decision in the European qualifying welterweight quarter-final. The victory secured her an Olympic quota place and made her the first German woman to qualify for an Olympic boxing competition. She subsequently defeated Italy's Angela Carini in the semi-final before losing the final to Turkey's Busenaz Sürmeneli.

At the delayed 2020 Summer Olympics in Tokyo, Apetz competed in the women's welterweight event. After receiving a first-round bye, she lost her opening bout to India's Lovlina Borgohain by a 3–2 points decision.

She completed her doctorate at the University of Cologne in 2022 with a thesis titled Modulation of Brain Activity and Networks by Deep Brain Stimulation of the Subthalamic Nucleus and L-DOPA Therapy in the 6-OHDA-Hemiparkinsonian Rat. Her thesis examined the effects of subthalamic deep brain stimulation and L-DOPA treatment on brain activity and neural networks in a Parkinsonian rat model. By October 2022, Apetz had ended her competitive boxing career; she never turned professional.

== Governance appointments and later career ==
Apetz became an athletes' representative for the German Boxing Association in 2018 and served until 2020, when she resigned, saying that the increasing time commitment had become difficult to reconcile with her sporting and professional responsibilities. Apetz became a member of the Youth Commission of the International Boxing Association (AIBA) for a term from 2019 to 2022.

Following reports of sexualised violence in German boxing in 2020, Apetz argued that athletes needed independent organisations to which misconduct could be reported without the conflicts created by dependence on sporting federations. She also called for greater safeguarding awareness among coaches and independent reporting structures.

After ending her boxing career, Apetz worked as a medical writer in a consultancy serving pharmaceutical and medical-device companies. She has been a co-opted member of the Stadtsportbund Köln (SSBK) board since 2023, where her area of responsibility is elite sport. She established Punch Parkinson, a non-contact boxing programme for people with Parkinson's disease. The programme uses boxing-based exercises to develop coordination and is offered through sports organisations in Cologne.

== Boxing record ==
Abbreviations: WP = win on points; RSC = referee stopped contest; TKO = technical knockout; AB = abandonment; WO = walkover (no bout contested).

The table lists known documented results: 68 wins, 2 draws, 24 losses and 1 walkover.

Documented amateur boxing results for Nadine Apetz
Result	Opponent	Type	Date	Location	Event	Ref.
Loss	Lovlina Borgohain	WP (2–3)	27 July 2021	Kokugikan Arena, Tokyo, Japan	2020 Summer Olympics – round of 16	
Loss	Busenaz Sürmeneli	WP (0–5)	8 June 2021	Le Grand Dôme, Villebon-sur-Yvette, France	European Olympic qualification tournament – final	
Win	Angela Carini	WP (4–1)	7 June 2021	Le Grand Dôme, Villebon-sur-Yvette, France	European Olympic qualification tournament – semi-final	
Win	Karolina Koszewska	WP (4–1)	5 June 2021	Le Grand Dôme, Villebon-sur-Yvette, France	European Olympic qualification tournament – quarter-final	
Loss	Emilie Sonvico	WP (1–4)	5 May 2021	Ústí nad Labem, Czech Republic	Ústí nad Labem Grand Prix – quarter-final	
Loss	Leonie Müller	WP	13 March 2021	Motorworld, Cologne, Germany	Cologne Boxing World Cup – final	
Win	Emilie Sonvico	WP	12 March 2021	Motorworld, Cologne, Germany	Cologne Boxing World Cup – semi-final	
Win	Yvonne Rasmussen	WP	14 February 2021	Motorworld, Cologne, Germany	Elite round-robin tournament	
Win	Sema Çalışkan	WP	13 February 2021	Cologne, Germany	Elite round-robin tournament	
Win	Leonie Müller	WP (5–0)	19 December 2020	Motorworld Arena, Cologne, Germany	Cologne Boxing World Cup – final	
Win	Anna Lysenko	WP (5–0)	18 December 2020	Motorworld Arena, Cologne, Germany	Cologne Boxing World Cup – semi-final	
Win	Melis Yonuzova	WP (5–0)	15 March 2020	Copper Box Arena, London, England	European Olympic qualification tournament – preliminary round	
Win	Karolina Koszewska	WP (3–0)	16 February 2020	Schwerin, Germany	International training matches (70 kg)	
Win	Assunta Canfora	WP (3–2)	15 February 2020	Schwerin, Germany	International training matches (70 kg)	
Loss	Oshae Jones	WP (1–4)	21 January 2020	Sofia, Bulgaria	Strandja tournament – preliminary round	
Loss	Saadat Dalgatova	WP (0–5)	9 October 2019	Ulan-Ude, Russia	2019 AIBA Women's World Boxing Championships – round of 16	
Win	Patrycja Borys	WP (4–1)	September 2019	Gliwice, Poland	Silesian Women's Open – final	
Win	Beatriz Soares	WP (3–2)	September 2019	Gliwice, Poland	Silesian Women's Open – semi-final	
Win	Anna Bilous	WP (5–0)	September 2019	Gliwice, Poland	Silesian Women's Open – quarter-final	
Loss	Assunta Canfora	WP (2–3)	28 June 2019	Minsk, Belarus	2019 European Games – semi-final	
Win	Vivien Budai	WP (5–0)	26 June 2019	Minsk, Belarus	2019 European Games – quarter-final	
Loss	Yang Liu	WP	April 2019	Sporthalle Süd, Cologne, Germany	Cologne Boxing World Cup – final	
Win	Rosie Eccles	WP (4–1)	12 April 2019	Cologne, Germany	Cologne Boxing World Cup – semi-final	
Win	Gráinne Walsh	WP (3–2)	11 April 2019	Cologne, Germany	Cologne Boxing World Cup – quarter-final	
Loss	Gu Hong	WP (1–4)	22 November 2018	New Delhi, India	2018 AIBA Women's World Boxing Championships – semi-final	
Win	Yaroslava Yakushina	WP (4–0)	20 November 2018	New Delhi, India	2018 AIBA Women's World Boxing Championships – quarter-final	
Win	Alcinda Panguana	WP (5–0)	18 November 2018	New Delhi, India	2018 AIBA Women's World Boxing Championships – round of 16	
Loss	Oshae Jones	—	October 2018	Chattanooga Convention Center, Chattanooga, United States	USA–Germany dual match	
Loss	Oshae Jones	—	October 2018	Chattanooga Convention Center, Chattanooga, United States	USA–Germany dual match	
Win	Emilie Sonvico	WP (3–2)	30 September 2018	Castellón de la Plana, Spain	Boxam tournament – final	
Win	Lucia Blazquez	WP (5–0)	September 2018	Castellón de la Plana, Spain	Boxam tournament – semi-final	
Win	Kaye Scott	WP (5–0)	September 2018	Castellón de la Plana, Spain	Boxam tournament – quarter-final	
Win	Ines Weimer	AB (round 2)	2018	Germany	German championships – final	
Win	Xenia Morell	RSC (round 3)	2018	Germany	German championships – semi-final	
Win	Leonie Müller	WP (5–0)	2018	Germany	German championships – quarter-final	
Loss	Yaroslava Yakushina	WP (0–5)	June 2018	Sofia, Bulgaria	European championships – semi-final	
Win	Maryam Jabrayilova	WP (5–0)	9 June 2018	Sofia, Bulgaria	European championships – quarter-final	
Win	Alina Veber	WP (3–2)	June 2018	Sofia, Bulgaria	European championships – preliminary round	
Win	Florina Radu	WP (5–0)	2018	Rostock, Germany	International round-robin tournament	
Win	Madina Nurshayeva	WP (5–0)	2018	Rostock, Germany	International round-robin tournament	
Loss	Elina Gustafsson	WP (0–5)	March 2018	Warsaw, Poland	Feliks Stamm tournament – final	
Win	Marianne Ahlborg	WP (5–0)	March 2018	Warsaw, Poland	Feliks Stamm tournament – semi-final	
Win	Martina Schmoranzova	WP (5–0)	March 2018	Warsaw, Poland	Feliks Stamm tournament – quarter-final	
Win	Hilke Bosse	RSC (round 2)	2017	Germany	German championships – final	
Walkover	Tamira Steffen	WO	2017	Germany	German championships – semi-final (no bout)	
Win	Hanna Solecka	WP (5–0)	August 2017	Cascia, Italy	European Union championships – final	
Win	Gráinne Walsh	WP (3–2)	August 2017	Cascia, Italy	European Union championships – semi-final	
Win	Sandy Ryan	WP (5–0)	August 2017	Cascia, Italy	European Union championships – quarter-final	
Win	Alina Syring	WP (5–0)	2017	Germany	German university championships – final	
Win	Shakhla Allakhverdiyeva	WP (5–0)	2017	Warsaw, Poland	Feliks Stamm tournament – final	
Win	Jessica Messina	WP (4–1)	5 May 2017	Warsaw, Poland	Feliks Stamm tournament – semi-final	
Win	Tetiana Rizhenkova	WP (5–0)	2017	Warsaw, Poland	Feliks Stamm tournament – quarter-final	
Win	Joelle Seydou	WP (3–0)	2016	Germany	German championships – final	
Win	Maria Kazaki	TKO (round 4)	2016	Germany	German championships – semi-final	
Win	Irina Schoenberger	WP (3–0)	2016	Germany	German championships – quarter-final	
Win	Ditte Frostholm	WP (2–1)	September 2016	Gliwice, Poland	Silesian Women's Open – final	
Win	Janine Hoffman	WP (3–0)	2016	Gliwice, Poland	Silesian Women's Open – semi-final	
Win	Hanna Solecka	WP (2–1)	2016	Gliwice, Poland	Silesian Women's Open – quarter-final	
Loss	Valentina Khalzova	WP (0–3)	26 May 2016	Astana, Kazakhstan	2016 AIBA Women's World Boxing Championships – semi-final	
Win	Naomi Graham	WP (3–0)	24 May 2016	Astana, Kazakhstan	2016 AIBA Women's World Boxing Championships – quarter-final	
Win	Timea Nagy	WP (3–0)	22 May 2016	Astana, Kazakhstan	2016 AIBA Women's World Boxing Championships – second preliminary round	
Win	Meena Rani	WP (3–0)	20 May 2016	Astana, Kazakhstan	2016 AIBA Women's World Boxing Championships – first preliminary round	
Loss	Lidia Fidura	WP (1–2)	March 2016	Totana, Spain	Totana tournament – quarter-final (75 kg)	
Loss	Darima Sandakova	WP (1–2)	October 2015	Stralsund, Germany	Queen's Box Cup – semi-final	
Win	Lina Skoghagen	WP (2–0)	2015	Stralsund, Germany	Queen's Box Cup – quarter-final	
Win	Ester Konecna	WP (3–0)	2015	Gliwice, Poland	Silesian Women's Open – final	
Win	Christina Oeynes	WP (3–0)	2015	Gliwice, Poland	Silesian Women's Open – semi-final	
Loss	Andrea Strohmaier	WP (0–3)	2015	Germany	German championships – final (75 kg)	
Win	Olivia Endale Maky	WP (3–0)	2015	Germany	German championships – semi-final (75 kg)	
Win	Olivia Endale Maky	WP (3–0)	2015	Schwerin, Germany	International round-robin team tournament (75 kg)	
Loss	Yaroslava Yakushina	WP (0–3)	2015	Schwerin, Germany	International round-robin team tournament (75 kg)	
Loss	Elżbieta Wójcik	WP (1–2)	2015	Schwerin, Germany	International round-robin team tournament (75 kg)	
Loss	Hanna Solecka	—	2015	—	International team match	
Loss	Erika Guerrier	WP (0–3)	November 2014	Jeju, South Korea	2014 AIBA Women's World Boxing Championships – second preliminary round	
Win	Ester Konecna	WP (3–0)	November 2014	Jeju, South Korea	2014 AIBA Women's World Boxing Championships – first preliminary round	
Loss	Andrea Strohmaier	WP (0–2)	2014	Germany	German championships – final (75 kg)	
Win	Olivia Endale Maky	WP (3–0)	2014	Germany	German championships – semi-final (75 kg)	
Loss	Mihaela Cristiana	WP (1–2)	June 2014	Bucharest, Romania	European championships – preliminary round	
Draw	Saadat Abdullayeva	—	2014	Wittenburg, Germany	Germany–Russia dual match	
Win	Clare Grace	WP (3–0)	March 2014	Wittenburg, Germany	Germany–Ireland dual match	
Win	Darlene Joerling	WP (3–0)	2013	Germany	German championships – final	
Win	Janine Hofmann	WP (3–0)	2013	Germany	German championships – semi-final	
Win	Irina Schoenberger	WP (3–0)	2013	Germany	German championships – quarter-final	
Win	Janine Hofmann	WP (19–12)	November 2012	Plön, Germany	German championships – final	
Win	Mattie Schuster	—	October 2012	Canberra, Australia	—	
Loss	Marichelle de Jong	WP (8–21)	October 2011	Rotterdam, Netherlands	European championships – quarter-final	
Win	Jessica Sowa	WP (19–17)	2011	Germany	German championships – final	
Win	Anette Klose	WP (15–9)	2011	Germany	German championships – semi-final	
Win	Lisa Eisenbrand	WP (14–4)	2011	Germany	German championships – quarter-final	
Win	Dariga Shakimova	—	December 2010	Halle (Saale), Germany	Germany–Kazakhstan dual match	
Win	Kristina Murashowa	WP (unanimous)	December 2010	Halle (Saale), Germany	Germany–Kazakhstan dual match	
Win	Janina Bonorden	WP (15–9)	November 2010	Braunschweig, Germany	North-west German championships – final	
Win	Ilona Skrzypek	Referee stoppage (round 1)	30 October 2010	Verden, Germany	Lower Saxony championships – final	
Win	Sabrina Jager	RSC (round 3)	14 November 2009	Schwanewede, Germany	Anniversary boxing event	
Draw	Lotte Wienbeck	—	7 November 2009	Kirchweyhe, Germany	Club boxing event	
