= 2018 AIBA Women's World Boxing Championships – Welterweight =

Boxing competitions

Welterweight at the 2018 AIBA Women's World Boxing Championships
- Dates: 16–24 November
- Competitors: 25 from 25 nations

Medalists
gold medal	Chen Nien-chin	Chinese Taipei
silver medal	Gu Hong	China
bronze medal	Lovlina Borgohain	India
bronze medal	Nadine Apetz	Germany

The Welterweight (64-69 kg) competition at the 2018 AIBA Women's World Boxing Championships was held from 16 to 24 November 2018.

== Draw ==
Round of 32
16 Nov
(Chinese Taipei) Chen Nien-chin	5
(Norway) Madeleine Angelsen	0
16 Nov
(Uzbekistan) Shakhnoza Yunusova	3
(Barbados) Kimberly Gittens	2
16 Nov
(Canada) Myriam Da Silva Rondeau	4
(Wales) Rosie Eccles	1
16 Nov
(Kazakhstan) Akerke Bakhytzhan	5
(Mongolia) Enkhbaataryn Erdenetuya	0
16 Nov
(Panama) Atheyna Bylon	3
(Ukraine) Yuliia Stoiko	2
16 Nov
(Mozambique) Alcinda Panguana	5
(New Zealand) Deanne Read	0
16 Nov
(United States) Oshae Jones	1
(Russia) Yaroslava Yakushina	4
16 Nov
(France) Émilie Sonvico	0
(Argentina) Lucía Pérez	5
16 Nov
(England) Sandy Ryan	2
(Italy) Angela Carini	3

Round of 16
18 Nov
(Finland) Elina Gustafsson	0
(Chinese Taipei) Chen Nien-chin	5
18 Nov
(Uzbekistan) Shakhnoza Yunusova	0
(Canada) Myriam Da Silva Rondeau	5
18 Nov
(Australia) Kaye Scott	5
(Kazakhstan) Akerke Bakhytzhan	0
18 Nov
(Panama) Atheyna Bylon	0
(India) Lovlina Borgohain	5
18 Nov
(Germany) Nadine Apetz	5
(Mozambique) Alcinda Panguana	0
18 Nov
(Russia) Yaroslava Yakushina	4
(Poland) Karolina Koszewska	1
18 Nov
(Republic of Ireland) Grainne Walsh	2
(Argentina) Lucía Pérez	3
18 Nov
(Italy) Angela Carini	0
(China) Gu Hong	5

Quarterfinals
20 Nov
(Chinese Taipei) Chen Nien-chin	4
(Canada) Myriam Da Silva Rondeau	1
20 Nov
(Australia) Kaye Scott	0
(India) Lovlina Borgohain	5
20 Nov
(Germany) Nadine Apetz	4
(Russia) Yaroslava Yakushina	0
20 Nov
(Argentina) Lucía Pérez	0
(China) Gu Hong	5

Semifinals
22 Nov
(Chinese Taipei) Chen Nien-chin	4
(India) Lovlina Borgohain	0
22 Nov
(Germany) Nadine Apetz	1
(China) Gu Hong	4

Final
24 Nov
(Chinese Taipei) Chen Nien-chin	3
(China) Gu Hong	2
