= 2019 AIBA Women's World Boxing Championships – Welterweight =

Welterweight at the 2019 AIBA Women's World Boxing Championships
- Venue: FSK Sports Complex
- Location: Ulan-Ude, Russia
- Dates: 4–13 October
- Competitors: 26 from 26 nations

Medalists
gold medal	Busenaz Sürmeneli	Turkey
silver medal	Yang Liu	China
bronze medal	Saadat Dalgatova	Russia
bronze medal	Lovlina Borgohain	India

The Welterweight competition at the 2019 AIBA Women's World Boxing Championships was held between 4 and 13 October 2019.

== Schedule ==
The schedule was as follows:

Date	Time	Round
Friday 4 October 2019	19:00 (Ring A); 19:15 (Ring B)	Round of 32
Wednesday 9 October 2019	14:00; 19:00	Round of 16
Thursday 10 October 2019	19:30	Quarterfinals
Saturday 12 October 2019	19:30	Semifinals
Sunday 13 October 2019	After 16:00	Final

All times are Irkutsk Time (UTC+8)

== Results ==
=== Finals ===
Semifinals
(China) Yang Liu	3
(India) Lovlina Borgohain	2
(Turkey) Busenaz Sürmeneli	3
(Russia) Saadat Dalgatova	2

Final
(China) Yang Liu	0
(Turkey) Busenaz Sürmeneli	4

=== Top half ===
==== Section 1 ====
Round of 32
(France) Emilie Sonvico	w/o
(Democratic Republic of the Congo) Jorbelle Malewu
(Argentina) Lucía Pérez	0
(Wales) Rosie Eccles	5
(China) Yang Liu	5
(Finland) Elina Gustafsson	0

Round of 16
(Chinese Taipei) Chen Nien-chin	5
(France) Emilie Sonvico	0
(Wales) Rosie Eccles	0
(China) Yang Liu	5

Quarterfinals
(Chinese Taipei) Chen Nien-chin	2
(China) Yang Liu	3

==== Section 2 ====
Round of 32
(Uzbekistan) Shakhnoza Yunusova	5
(Tajikistan) Idimokh Kholova	0
(Barbados) Kimberly Gittens	0
(Morocco) Oumayma Bel Ahbib	5

Round of 16
(Poland) Karolina Koszewska	5
(Uzbekistan) Shakhnoza Yunusova	0
(Morocco) Oumayma Bel Ahbib	0
(India) Lovlina Borgohain	5

Quarterfinals
(Poland) Karolina Koszewska	1
(India) Lovlina Borgohain	4

=== Bottom half ===
==== Section 3 ====
Round of 32
(Australia) Kaye Scott	0
(Turkey) Busenaz Sürmeneli	5
(England) Sandy Ryan	1
(Republic of Ireland) Christina Desmond	4

Round of 16
(Italy) Assunta Canfora	0
(Turkey) Busenaz Sürmeneli	5
(Republic of Ireland) Christina Desmond	5
(Canada) Myriam Da Silva Rondeau	0

Quarterfinals
(Turkey) Busenaz Sürmeneli	5
(Republic of Ireland) Christina Desmond	0

==== Section 4 ====
Round of 32
(Kazakhstan) Dariga Shakimova	5
(Czech Republic) Martina Schmoranzová	0
(United States) Oshae Jones	5
(Armenia) Ani Hovsepyan	0
(Russia) Saadat Dalgatova	5
(Mongolia) Enkhbaataryn Erdenetuya	0

Round of 16
(Kazakhstan) Dariga Shakimova	0
(United States) Oshae Jones	5
(Russia) Saadat Dalgatova	5
(Germany) Nadine Apetz	0

Quarterfinals
(United States) Oshae Jones	1
(Russia) Saadat Dalgatova	4
