= Boxing at the 2019 European Games – Qualification =

Boxing competitions

There was a nominal total of 316 athlete quota places available for boxing at the 2019 European Games; 256 for men and 60 for women.

== Qualification rules ==
Each National Olympic Committee (NOC) is restricted to one entry per event, which equates to a maximum quota of fifteen qualified boxers. Quota places earned through qualification were awarded to the qualifying boxers.

As the host NOC, Belarus was guaranteed athlete quota places for all fifteen categories.

=== Men ===
In keeping with procedure for previous European Amateur Boxing Championships, each NOC could simply enter their boxers of choice. There were no category-specific limits on quota places.

=== Women ===
Each category was assigned 12 quota places, of which 2 were nominally reserved for host NOC and universality allocations.

Qualification for the remaining 10 was determined primarily by NOC placings in the December 2018 AIBA World Ranking. Any outstanding places were allocated to unranked boxers best placed in the 2018 European Championships, then (if required) the 2018 World Championships.

Unused quota places (including those reserved as above) were reallocated based on performances at the aforementioned championships.

== Qualification timeline ==
Event	Dates	Location
AIBA Women's World Ranking	January 2017 – December 2018	Various cities
2018 Women's European Amateur Boxing Championships	4–13 June 2018	Sofia, Bulgaria
2018 AIBA Women's World Boxing Championships	15–24 November 2018	New Delhi, India

== Women's events ==
=== 51 kg (flyweight) ===
Competition	Places	Qualified boxer
Host country	1	Volha Lushchyk (BLR)
AIBA World Ranking	7	Svetlana Soluianova (RUS); Sandra Drabik (POL); Buse Naz Çakıroğlu (TUR); Gabriela Dimitrova (BUL); Veronica Losvik (NOR); Claudia Nechita (ROU); Aikaterini Koutsogeorgopoulou (GRE)
2018 European Championships	2	Tetyana Kob (UKR); Nela Freiherrová (CZE)
Universality place	1	Anush Grigoryan (ARM)
Total	11	

=== 57 kg (featherweight) ===
Competition	Places	Qualified boxer
Host country	1	Helina Bruyevich (BLR)
AIBA World Ranking	9	Ornella Wahner (GER); Jemyma Betrian (NED); Stanimira Petrova (BUL); Alessia Mesiano (ITA); Daria Abramova (RUS); Mona Mestiaen (FRA); Michaela Walsh (IRL); Lăcrămioara Perijoc (ROU); Jelena Zekić (SRB)
2018 European Championships	2	Sara Beram (CRO); Satı Burcu (TUR)
Total	12	

=== 60 kg (lightweight) ===
Competition	Places	Qualified boxer
Host country	1	Ala Yarshevich (BLR)
AIBA World Ranking	8	Kellie Harrington (IRL); Mira Potkonen (FIN); Denitsa Eliseeva (BUL); Anastasia Belyakova (RUS); Agnes Alexiusson (SWE); Aneta Rygielska (POL); Iuliia Tsyplakova (UKR); Cristina Cravcenco (MDA)
2018 European Championships	2	Irma Testa (ITA); Ditte Ajaaja Frostholm (DEN)
Universality place	1	Donjeta Sadiku (KOS)
Total	12	

=== 69 kg (welterweight) ===
Competition	Places	Qualified boxer
Host country	1	Antanina Aksenava (BLR)
AIBA World Ranking	8	Nadine Apetz (GER); Yaroslava Yakushina (RUS); Elina Gustafsson (FIN); Assunta Canfora (ITA); Martina Schmoranzová (CZE); Rosie Eccles (GBR); Émilie Sonvico (FRA); Maryam Jabrailova (AZE)
2018 European Championships	3	Karoliną Koszewską (POL); Grainne Walsh (IRL); Vivien Budai (HUN)
Total	12	

=== 75 kg (middleweight) ===
Competition	Places	Qualified boxer
Host country	1	Viktoria Kebikova (BLR)
AIBA World Ranking	7	Nouchka Fontijn (NED); Lauren Price (GBR); Sarah Scheurich (GER); Elżbieta Wójcik (POL); Mariya Borutsa (UKR); Darima Sandakova (RUS); Tímea Nagy (HUN)
2018 European Championships	2	Busenaz Sürmeneli (TUR); Patricia Martin (ESP)
2018 World Championships	2	Aoife O'Rourke (IRL); Love Holgersson (SWE)
Total	12	
