= 2023 IBA Women's World Boxing Championships – Welterweight =

Welterweight at the 2023 IBA Women's World Boxing Championships
- Venue: K. D. Jadhav Indoor Hall
- Location: New Delhi, India
- Dates: 18–26 March
- Competitors: 31 from 31 nations

Medalists
gold medal	Yang Liu	China
silver medal	Janjaem Suwannapheng	Thailand
bronze medal	Navbakhor Khamidova	Uzbekistan
bronze medal	Nadezhda Ryabets	Kazakhstan

The Welterweight competition at the 2023 IBA Women's World Boxing Championships was held between 18 and 26 March 2023.

== Results ==
=== Finals ===
Semi-finals
(Algeria) ~~Imane Khelif~~	5
(Thailand) Janjaem Suwannapheng	0 (Note: The original winner, Algeria’s Imane Khelif has been disqualified from the IBA Women's World Boxing Championships after failing to meet eligibility rules.)
(China) Yang Liu	4
(Kazakhstan) Nadezhda Ryabets	1

Final
(Thailand) Janjaem Suwannapheng	0
(China) Yang Liu	5

=== Top half ===
==== Section 1 ====
Round of 32
(New Zealand) Cara Wharerau	0
(India) Manju Bamboriya	5
(Russia) Azaliia Amineva	RSC
(Belarus) Aryna Danilchyk
(Kenya) Friza Anyango
(Algeria) ~~Imane Khelif~~	RSC

Round of 16
(Uzbekistan) Navbakhor Khamidova	5
(India) Manju Bamboriya	0
(Russia) Azaliia Amineva	1
(Algeria) ~~Imane Khelif~~	4

Quarterfinals
(Uzbekistan) Navbakhor Khamidova	0
(Algeria) ~~Imane Khelif~~	5

==== Section 2 ====
Round of 32
(Thailand) Janjaem Suwannapheng	5
(Hungary) Luca Hámori	0
(Cameroon) Mireille Bindzi	4
(Turkmenistan) Gülzada Jorakulyýewa	0
(Australia) Marissa Williamson	5
(Colombia) Shirleidis Orozco	0
(Guatemala) Victoria Chiroy	0
(Brazil) Beatriz Soares	5

Round of 16
(Thailand) Janjaem Suwannapheng	5
(Cameroon) Mireille Bindzi	0
(Australia) Marissa Williamson	1
(Brazil) Beatriz Soares	4

Quarterfinals
(Thailand) Janjaem Suwannapheng	4
(Brazil) Beatriz Soares	3

=== Bottom half ===
==== Section 3 ====
Round of 32
(Chinese Taipei) Chen Nien-chin	0
(China) Yang Liu	5
(Serbia) Milena Matović	5
(Turkey) Sema Çalışkan	0
(Italy) Angela Carini	3
(France) Emilie Sonvico	4
(Singapore) Leah Warden	0
(Puerto Rico) Stephanie Piñeiro	5

Round of 16
(China) Yang Liu	3
(Serbia) Milena Matović	1
(France) Emilie Sonvico	0
(Puerto Rico) Stephanie Piñeiro	5

Quarterfinals
(China) Yang Liu	4
(Puerto Rico) Stephanie Piñeiro	1

==== Section 4 ====
Round of 32
(Dominican Republic) María Moronta	5
(Azerbaijan) Shahla Allahverdiyeva	0
(South Korea) Seon Su-jin	3
(Kazakhstan) Nadezhda Ryabets	4
(Japan) Arisa Tsubata	0
(Mongolia) Myagmarsürengiin Tsetsegdari	5
(Botswana) Aratwa Kasemang	0
(Cape Verde) Ivanusa Gomes	5

Round of 16
(Dominican Republic) María Moronta	0
(Kazakhstan) Nadezhda Ryabets	5
(Mongolia) Myagmarsürengiin Tsetsegdari	0
(Cape Verde) Ivanusa Gomes	5

Quarterfinals
(Kazakhstan) Nadezhda Ryabets	5
(Cape Verde) Ivanusa Gomes	0
