= Lovlina Borgohain =

Indian boxer (born 1997)

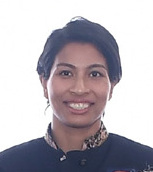
- Borgohain in August 2022

Personal information
- Nationality: Indian
- Born: 2 October 1997 (age 29) Baromukhia, Golaghat, Assam, India
- Height: 1.78 m (5 ft 10 in)
- Weight: 75 kg (165 lb)
- Website: lovlinaborgohain.com

Boxing career
- Weight class: Welterweight / Middleweight
- Stance: Orthodox

Boxing record
- Total fights: 56
- Wins: 33
- Losses: 22
- Draws: 1
Medal record
Women's amateur boxing
Representing India
Event	1st	2nd	3rd
Olympic Games	0	0	1
World Championships	1	0	2
Asian Games	1	1	0
Asian Championships	1	0	2
Commonwealth Games	0	1	0
Total	3	2	5
Olympic Games
Bronze medal – third place	2020 Tokyo	Welterweight
World Championships
Gold medal – first place	2023 New Delhi	Middleweight
Bronze medal – third place	2018 New Delhi	Welterweight
Bronze medal – third place	2019 Ulan-Ude	Welterweight
Asian Games
Gold medal – first place	2026 Aichi–Nagoya	Middleweight
Silver medal – second place	2022 Hangzhou	Middleweight
Asian Championships
Gold medal – first place	2022 Amman	Middleweight
Bronze medal – third place	2017 Ho Chi Minh City	Welterweight
Bronze medal – third place	2021 Dubai	Welterweight
Commonwealth Games
Silver medal – second place	2026 Glasgow	Middleweight

Lovlina Borgohain (born 2 October 1997) is an Indian boxer. She initially competed in the welterweight class before moving up to middleweight. She won the bronze medal in the women's welterweight event at the 2020 Olympic Games, thereby becoming only the third Indian boxer to win a medal at the Olympics. She has won a gold medal and two bronze medals in the IBA Women's World Boxing Championships. She also won a gold medal at the 2026 Asian Games, silver medals at the 2022 Asian Games and the 2026 Commonwealth Games, and bronze medals at the 2018 and the 2019 AIBA Women's World Boxing Championships.

Borgohain received the Khel Ratna Award, India's highest sporting honour, in 2021, and Arjuna Award, India's second highest sporting honour, in 2020 from the Government of India. She was appointed as the deputy superintendent of police by the Assam Police in 2022.

== Early and personal life ==
Lovlina Borgohain was born on 2 October 1997 in Baramukhia village in Golaghat district of Assam. She is the youngest of the three daughters of Tiken and Mamoni Borgohain, who were engaged in agriculture. Lovlina and her sisters learnt Muay Thai, a Thai martial art. While her sisters went on to take part in Muay Thai competitions nationally, Lovlina switched to boxing. In 2013, she was spotted by boxing coach Padum Boro, during a boxing camp organised by the Sports Authority of India. She later started training under Boro at Guwahati. She was later coached by Sandhya Gurung.

In 2019, Borgohain signed up with sports management firm Infinity Optimal Solutions, which handled her endorsements and commercial interests. In January 2022, she was appointed as a Deputy superintendent of police in the Assam Police by the Government of Assam.

== Career ==
=== Early years (2017–2019) ===
Lovlina won a bronze medal at the President's Cup in Astana in June 2017, and the bronze medal in the women's welterweight category at the 2017 Asian Women's Amateur Boxing Championships in Ho Chi Minh City in November 2017. In February 2018, she won the gold medal in the welterweight category at the first India Open International Boxing Tournament in New Delhi. In April 2018, she was part of the India team for the 2018 Commonwealth Games. In the women's welterweight competition, she lost to eventual gold-medalist Sandy Ryan of England in her first bout in the quarterfinals by a 2-3 split decision.

Lovlina won a silver medal at the Ulaanbaatar Cup in Mongolia in June 2018, and a bronze medal at the 13th International Silesian Championship in Poland in September 2018. She was part of the India squad for the 2018 AIBA Women's World Boxing Championships held in New Delhi. She won the bronze medal in the women's welterweight competition held on 23 November 2018. She won a silver medal at the second edition of the India Open International Boxing Tournament in Guwahati in 2019. She competed in the women's welterweight competition at the 2019 AIBA Women's World Boxing Championships held in Ulan-Ude from 3 to 13 October 2019. She defeated Morocco's Bel Ahbib Oumayma by an unanimous decision in her first bout. She lost to China's Yang Liu in the semi-final by 2–3 split decision and won the bronze medal.

=== Olympic qualification and medal (2020–2021) ===
She wanted to win and that was a fundamental change. Lovlina is a girl who is very attached to her family, to her fellow citizens. I tried to motivate her by shouting that the whole of India was watching her and she could write her own story.

— Raffaelle Bergamesco, India women's boxing team coach

In March 2020, Borgohain secured a quota place in the women's welterweight category for the boxing events at the 2020 Summer Olympics in Tokyo with a win over Maftunakhon Melieva of Uzbekistan in the quarter-finals of the 2020 Asia & Oceania Boxing Olympic Qualification Tournament. She lost to Gu Hong of China in the semi-finals and won a bronze medal at the Olympic Qualifiers. She trained at Assisi from 15 October to 5 December 2020 ahead of the Summer Olympics.

When Lovlina represented India at the 2020 Summer Olympics, she became the first female athlete and the second boxer from Assam to represent India at the Summer Olympics. She defeated the Germany's Nadine Apetz in the preliminary round and Taiwan's Chen Nien-chin in the quarter-finals. In the semi-finals, she lost to eventual gold medalist Busenaz Sürmeneli of Turkey and won the bronze medal.

=== Later years (2022-present) ===
In the 2022 IBA Women's World Boxing Championships at Istanbul, Lovlina competed in the light middleweight category. She defeated Taiwan's Chen Nien-Chin in the first round before losing to Cindy Ngamba in the pre-quarter finals. In May 2022, she was elected as the chair and a voting member on the board of directors for International Boxing Association Athletes' Committee. She won the gold medal in the middleweight category at the 2023 IBA Women's World Boxing Championships at New Delhi after defeating Australia's Caitlin Parker in the final. She took part in the women's 75 kg category at the 2024 Summer Olympics at Paris. She defeated Norway's Sunniva Hofstad in her first bout before losing to Li Qian of China in the quarter-finals.

In the women's 75 kg event at the 2026 Commonwealth Games in Glasgow, Lovlina obtained a direct entry into the semi-finals, thereby assuring herself of a medal as per the Commonwealth Games boxing rules. In the semi-finals, she defeated Tarona Taafaki of Tuvalu to progress to the finals. In the finals, she lost to Emma-Sue Greentree of Australia by a 1–4 split decision to win the silver medal. At the 2026 Asian Games in Nagoya, she won the gold medal in the women's 75 kg weight category after defeating Bao Ziyi of China in the final in a unanimous decision. She is only the second female Indian boxer after Mary Kom at 2014 Asian Games to win a gold medal for India at the Asian Games.

== Awards and recognition ==
Lovlina was awarded the Arjuna Award, India's second highest sporting honour, in 2020, and the Khel Ratna Award, India's highest sporting honour, in 2021, by the Government of India. She received the Assam Saurabh, Assam's second highest civilian award, from the Government of Assam in 2021. She was named as the "Boxer of the Year" for 2021 by The Times of India. She received the Bhogeswar Baruah National Sports Award from the Government of Assam in 2025.

After winning the bronze medal at the 2020 Summer Olympics, she was awarded ₹3 million (equivalent to ₹3.7 million or US$38,000 in 2026) by the Government of India, and ₹10 million (US$100,000) by the Government of Assam. She was also given ₹2.5 million (equivalent to ₹3.1 million or US$32,000 in 2026) by the Board of Control for Cricket in India, and ₹0.3 million (equivalent to ₹370,000 or US$3,800 in 2026) by the Assam Pradesh Congress Committee.

== See also ==
- Boxing in India
