= Boxing at the 2020 Summer Olympics – Women's welterweight =

Olympic boxing event

Women's welterweight at the Games of the XXXII Olympiad
- Boxing pictogram
- Venue: Ryōgoku Kokugikan
- Dates: 24 July 2021; 7 August 2021
- Competitors: 18 from 18 nations

Medalists
1st place, gold medalist(s)		Busenaz Sürmeneli	Turkey
2nd place, silver medalist(s)		Gu Hong	China
3rd place, bronze medalist(s)		Lovlina Borgohain	India
3rd place, bronze medalist(s)		Oshae Jones	United States

The women's welterweight boxing event at the 2020 Summer Olympics took place between 24 July and 7 August 2021 at the Ryōgoku Kokugikan. There were 18 boxers from 18 nations in the competition. Reigning welterweight World Champion Busenaz Sürmeneli of Turkey won the gold medal.

== Background ==
This competition marked the debut appearance of the women's welterweight event. The previous women's tournaments in 2012 and 2016 skipped directly from lightweight (57–60 kg) to middleweight (69–75 kg). Welterweight fills some of that gap, at 64–69 kg.

== Qualification ==
A National Olympic Committee (NOC) could enter only 1 qualified boxer in the weight class. There were 18 quota places available for the women's welterweight, allocated as follows:

- 2 places at the 2020 African Boxing Olympic Qualification Tournament.
- 4 places at the 2020 Asia & Oceania Boxing Olympic Qualification Tournament.
- 5 places at the 2020 European Boxing Olympic Qualification Tournament.
- 3 places that were intended to be awarded at the 2021 Pan American Boxing Olympic Qualification Tournament, which was cancelled. These places were instead awarded through the world ranking list to the top boxers from the Americas who had been registered for the qualification tournament.
- 4 places that were intended to be awarded at a World Olympic Qualifying Tournament, which was cancelled. These places were instead awarded through the world ranking list, with one place for each continental zone (Africa, Asia & Oceania, Europe, Americas).

The host nation, Japan, was guaranteed a minimum of two places across the five women's boxing events; because Japan qualified boxers in the flyweight and featherweight through the Asia & Oceania tournament, no host places were used in any women's weight class. No Tripartite Commission invitation places were used for this weight class.

== Competition format ==
Like all Olympic boxing events, the competition is a straight single-elimination tournament. The competition begins with a preliminary round, where the number of competitors is reduced to 16, and concludes with a final. As there are fewer than 32 boxers in the competition, a number of boxers will receive a bye through the preliminary round. Both semifinal losers are awarded bronze medals.

Bouts consist of three three-minute rounds with a one-minute break between rounds. A boxer may win by knockout or by points. Scoring is on the "10-point-must" system, with 5 judges scoring each round. Judges consider "number of blows landed on the target areas, domination of the bout, technique and tactical superiority and competitiveness." Each judge determines a winner for each round, who receives 10 points for the round, and assigns the round's loser a number of points between 7 and 9 based on performance. The judge's scores for each round are added to give a total score for that judge. The boxer with the higher score from a majority of the judges is the winner.

== Schedule ==
The welterweight starts with the round of 32 on 24 July. There are two rest days before the round of 16 on 27 July, two more before the quarterfinals on 30 July, four more before the semifinals on 4 August, and two more before the final on 7 August.

Legend

R32	Round of 32	R16	Round of 16	QF	Quarterfinals	SF	Semifinals	F	Final

Date	Jul 24		Jul 25		Jul 26		Jul 27		Jul 28		Jul 29		Jul 30		Jul 31		Aug 1		Aug 2		Aug 3		Aug 4		Aug 5		Aug 6		Aug 7		Aug 8	
Event	A	E	A	E	A	E	A	E	A	E	A	E	A	E	A	E	A	E	A	E	A	E	A	E	A	E	A	E	A	E	A	E
Women's welterweight	R32						R16						QF										SF						F			

== Results ==
=== Finals ===
Final
Busenaz Sürmeneli (TUR)	3
Gu Hong (CHN)	0

=== Top half ===
Round of 32
Karolina Koszewska (POL)	5
Shakhnoza Yunusova (UZB)	0

Round of 16
Busenaz Sürmeneli (TUR)	5
Karolina Koszewska (POL)	0
Oumayma Bel Ahbib (MAR)	0
Anna Lysenko (UKR)	5
Nadine Apetz (GER)	2
Lovlina Borgohain (IND)	3
Angela Carini (ITA)	2
Chen Nien-chin (TPE)	3

Quarterfinals
Busenaz Sürmeneli (TUR)	5
Anna Lysenko (UKR)	0
Lovlina Borgohain (IND)	4
Chen Nien-chin (TPE)	1

Semifinals
Busenaz Sürmeneli (TUR)	5
Lovlina Borgohain (IND)	0

=== Bottom half ===
Round of 32
Saadat Dalgatova (ROC)	1
Baison Manikon (THA)	4

Round of 16
Oshae Jones (USA)	3
Brianda Cruz (MEX)	2
Myriam Da Silva (CAN)	0
María Moronta (DOM)	5
Elizabeth Akinyi (KEN)
Alcinda Panguana (MOZ)	RSC
Baison Manikon (THA)	0
Gu Hong (CHN)	5

Quarterfinals
Oshae Jones (USA)	4
María Moronta (DOM)	0
Alcinda Panguana (MOZ)	0
Gu Hong (CHN)	5

Semifinals
Oshae Jones (USA)	1
Gu Hong (CHN)	4
