= Boxing at the 2024 Summer Olympics – Women's 66 kg =

Women's 66 kg at the Games of the XXXIII Olympiad
- Boxing pictogram
- Venue: Arena Paris Nord (preliminary); Stade Roland Garros (semifinals and finals)
- Dates: 28 July – 9 August 2024
- Competitors: 20 from 20 nations

Medalists
1st place, gold medalist(s)		Imane Khelif	Algeria
2nd place, silver medalist(s)		Yang Liu	China
3rd place, bronze medalist(s)		Janjaem Suwannapheng	Thailand
3rd place, bronze medalist(s)		Chen Nien-chin	Chinese Taipei

The women's 66 kg (welterweight) boxing event at the 2024 Summer Olympics took place between 28 July and 9 August 2024. Preliminary boxing matches occurred at Arena Paris Nord in Villepinte, with the medal rounds (semifinals and finals) staged at Stade Roland Garros.

== Background ==
This was the second appearance of the women's welterweight event. The previous women's tournaments in 2012 and 2016 skipped directly from lightweight (57–60 kg) to middleweight (69–75 kg). Welterweight fills some of that gap, at 64–69 kg.

== Qualification ==
Each NOC could send one boxer to the event.

== Competition format ==
Like all Olympic boxing events, the competition was a straight single-elimination tournament. The competition began with a preliminary round, where the number of competitors was reduced to 16, and concluded with a final. As there were fewer than 32 boxers in the competition, a number of boxers received a bye through the preliminary round. Both semi-final losers were awarded bronze medals.

Bouts consisted of three three-minute rounds with a one-minute break between rounds. A boxer may win by knockout or by points. Scoring was on the "10-point-must," with five judges scoring each round. Judges consider "number of blows landed on the target areas, domination of the bout, technique and tactical superiority and competitiveness." Each judge determined a winner for each round, who received 10 points for the round, and assigned the round's loser a number of points between seven and nine based on performance. The judge's scores for each round were added to give a total score for that judge. The boxer with the higher score from a majority of the judges was the winner.

== Schedule ==
The schedule was as follows.

Legend

R32	Round of 32	R16	Round of 16	QF	Quarter-Finals	SF	Semi-Finals	F	Final

Jul 28	Jul 29	Jul 30	Jul 31	Aug 1	Aug 2	Aug 3	Aug 4	Aug 5	Aug 6	Aug 7	Aug 8	Aug 9
R32				R16		QF			SF			F

== Draw ==
The draw was held on 25 July 2024.

== Seeds ==
The seeds were released on 25 July 2024.

1. Busenaz Sürmeneli (TUR) (quarterfinals)
2. Yang Liu (CHN) (final, silver medalist)
3. Bárbara Maria dos Santos (BRA) (round of 16)
4. Marissa Williamson (AUS) (round of 16)
5. Imane Khelif (ALG) (champion)
6. Morelle McCane (USA) (round of 16)
7. Oshin Derieuw (BEL) (quarterfinals)
8. Janjaem Suwannapheng (THA) (semifinals)

== Results ==
=== Finals ===
Final
Imane Khelif (ALG)	5
Yang Liu (CHN)	0

=== Top half ===
Round of 32
Rosie Eccles (GBR)	2
Aneta Rygielska (POL)	3
Gráinne Walsh (IRL)	1
Luca Hámori (HUN)	4

Round of 16
Busenaz Sürmeneli (TUR)	4
Aneta Rygielska (POL)	1
Brigitte Mbabi (COD)	1
Janjaem Suwannapheng (THA)	4
Imane Khelif (ALG)	ABD
Angela Carini (ITA)
Luca Hámori (HUN)	5
Marissa Williamson (AUS)	0

Quarterfinals
Busenaz Sürmeneli (TUR)	1
Janjaem Suwannapheng (THA)	4
Imane Khelif (ALG)	5
Luca Hámori (HUN)	0

Semifinals
Janjaem Suwannapheng (THA)	0
Imane Khelif (ALG)	5

=== Bottom half ===
Round of 32
María Moronta (DOM)	1
Chen Nien-chin (TPE)	4
Alcinda Panguana (MOZ)	5
Jessica Triebeľová (SVK)	0

Round of 16
Bárbara Maria dos Santos (BRA)	0
Chen Nien-chin (TPE)	5
Navbakhor Khamidova (UZB)	3
Morelle McCane (USA)	2
Oshin Derieuw (BEL)	3
Ivanusa Moreira (CPV)	2
Alcinda Panguana (MOZ)	0
Yang Liu (CHN)	5

Quarterfinals
Chen Nien-chin (TPE)	5
Navbakhor Khamidova (UZB)	0
Oshin Derieuw (BEL)	0
Yang Liu (CHN)	5

Semifinals
Chen Nien-chin (TPE)	1
Yang Liu (CHN)	4
