= 2023 IBA Women's World Boxing Championships – Middleweight =

Middleweight at the 2023 IBA Women's World Boxing Championships
- Venue: K. D. Jadhav Indoor Hall
- Location: New Delhi, India
- Dates: 17–26 March
- Competitors: 21 from 21 nations

Medalists
gold medal	Lovlina Borgohain	India
silver medal	Caitlin Parker	Australia
bronze medal	Li Qian	China
bronze medal	Valentina Khalzova	Kazakhstan

The Middleweight competition at the 2023 IBA Women's World Boxing Championships was held between 17 and 26 March 2023.

== Results ==
=== Finals ===
Semi-finals
(India) Lovlina Borgohain	4
(China) Li Qian	1
(Kazakhstan) Valentina Khalzova	0
(Australia) Caitlin Parker	5

Final
(India) Lovlina Borgohain	5
(Australia) Caitlin Parker	2

=== Top half ===
==== Section 1 ====
Round of 32
(Vietnam) Điểm Quỳnh Lưu	0
(Uzbekistan) Sokhiba Ruzmetova	5

Round of 16
(Mozambique) Rady Gramane	5
(Uzbekistan) Sokhiba Ruzmetova	0
(Mexico) Citlalli Ortiz	0
(India) Lovlina Borgohain	5

Quarterfinals
(Mozambique) Rady Gramane	0
(India) Lovlina Borgohain	5

==== Section 2 ====
Round of 32
(Belarus) Alina Veber	5
(New Zealand) Elenoa Lilo	0
(Kenya) Elizabeth Akinyi	0
(Chinese Taipei) Lin Chien-yu	5

Round of 16
(France) Davina Michel	5
(Belarus) Alina Veber	0
(Chinese Taipei) Lin Chien-yu
(China) Li Qian	RSC

Quarterfinals
(France) Davina Michel	0
(China) Li Qian	5

=== Bottom half ===
==== Section 3 ====
Round of 32
(Turkey) Elif Güneri	5
(Thailand) Baison Manikon	2

Round of 16
(Brazil) Viviane Pereira	1
(Turkey) Elif Güneri	4
(Venezuela) Maryelis Yriza	0
(Kazakhstan) Valentina Khalzova	5

Quarterfinals
(Turkey) Elif Güneri	0
(Kazakhstan) Valentina Khalzova	4

==== Section 4 ====
Round of 32
(Colombia) Angie Solano	0
(Russia) Anastasiia Shamonova	5

Round of 16
(Australia) Caitlin Parker	5
(Slovakia) Jessica Triebeľová	0
(Russia) Anastasiia Shamonova	0
(Panama) Atheyna Bylon	5

Quarterfinals
(Australia) Caitlin Parker	4
(Panama) Atheyna Bylon	3
