= 2014 AIBA Women's World Boxing Championships – Middleweight =

Boxing competitions

The Middleweight (75 kg) competition at the 2014 AIBA Women's World Boxing Championships was held from 19–24 November 2014.

== Medalists ==
Gold	Claressa Shields (USA)
Silver	Li Qian (CHN)
Bronze	Nouchka Fontijn (NED)
Bronze	Ariane Fortin (CAN)

== Draw ==
=== Top half ===
First Round
(Netherlands) Nouchka Fontijn	TKO
(Chinese Taipei) Shen Dara Flora
(Morocco) Khadija Mardi	2
(Brazil) Flavia Tereza	1
(Italy) Francesca Amato	0
(Germany) Andrea Strohmaier	3
(Azerbaijan) Leyla Javadova	0
(Australia) Kaye Scott	2
(China) Li Qian	3
(India) Monica Saun	0
(Belarus) Victoriya Kebikava	0
(Sweden) Love Holgersson	3

Second Round
(Cameroon) Azangue Yannicke	0
(Netherlands) Nouchka Fontijn	3
(Morocco) Khadija Mardi	2
(Germany) Andrea Strohmaier	0
(Australia) Kaye Scott	0
(China) Li Qian	3
(Sweden) Love Holgersson	1
(Ukraine) Kateryna Shambir	2

Quarterfinals
(Netherlands) Nouchka Fontijn	3
(Morocco) Khadija Mardi	0
(China) Li Qian	3
(Ukraine) Kateryna Shambir	0

Semifinals
(Netherlands) Nouchka Fontijn	0
(China) Li Qian	2

=== Bottom half ===
First Round
(Costa Rica) Emily Jiménez
(Russia) Iaroslava Iakushina	TKO
(Uganda) Hellen Baleke
(United States) Claressa Shields	TKO
(South Korea) Choi Su-yeon	0
(Poland) Lidia Fidura	3
(Egypt) Rana Abdelhamid	3
(Japan) Shizuyo Yamasaki	0
(Mongolia) Erdenesoyolyn Undram	0
(Canada) Ariane Fortin	3
(New Zealand) Roseanna Cox	0
(Kazakhstan) Anastassiya Rylina	3

Second Round
(England) Savannah Marshall	0
(Russia) Iaroslava Iakushina	2
(United States) Claressa Shields	3
(Poland) Lidia Fidura	0
(Egypt) Rana Abdelhamid	0
(Canada) Ariane Fortin	3
(Kazakhstan) Anastassiya Rylina	0
(Hungary) Tímea Nagy	2

Quarterfinals
(Russia) Iaroslava Iakushina	0
(United States) Claressa Shields	3
(Canada) Ariane Fortin	3
(Hungary) Tímea Nagy	0

Semifinals
(United States) Claressa Shields	3
(Canada) Ariane Fortin	0

=== Final ===
Final
(China) Li Qian	0
(United States) Claressa Shields	3
