= Boxing at the 2022 Asian Games =

- Venue: Hangzhou Gymnasium
- Dates: 24 September – 5 October 2023
- Competitors: 238 from 38 nations

Boxing at the 2022 Asian Games was held at Hangzhou Gymnasium, Hangzhou, China, from 24 September to 5 October 2023. This tournament also served as a continental qualification event for the 2024 Summer Olympics.

== Schedule ==
P	Round of 32	R	Round of 16	¼	Quarterfinals	½	Semifinals	F	Final

Event↓/Date →	24th Sun	25th Mon	26th Tue	27th Wed	28th Thu	29th Fri	30th Sat	1st Sun	2nd Mon	3rd Tue	4th Wed	5th Thu
Men's 51 kg		P			R					¼	½	F
Men's 57 kg			P				R			¼	½	F
Men's 63.5 kg	P			R				¼		½	F	
Men's 71 kg		P			R		¼			½	F	
Men's 80 kg	P					R		¼			½	F
Men's 92 kg				R		¼		½		F		
Men's +92 kg			R				¼			½		F
Women's 50 kg	P			R		¼		½		F		
Women's 54 kg	R						¼			½	F	
Women's 57 kg						R		¼			½	F
Women's 60 kg	P				R			¼		½	F	
Women's 66 kg		R						¼			½	F
Women's 75 kg			R				¼			½	F	

== Medalists ==
=== Men ===
Event	Gold	Silver	Bronze
Flyweight (51 kg)	Hasanboy Dusmatov; Uzbekistan	Thitisan Panmod; Thailand	So Chon-ryong; North Korea
Flyweight (51 kg)	Hasanboy Dusmatov; Uzbekistan	Thitisan Panmod; Thailand	Tomoya Tsuboi; Japan
Featherweight (57 kg)	Abdumalik Khalokov; Uzbekistan	Shudai Harada; Japan	Lü Ping; China
Featherweight (57 kg)	Abdumalik Khalokov; Uzbekistan	Shudai Harada; Japan	Rujakran Juntrong; Thailand
Light welterweight (63.5 kg)	None awarded	Lai Chu-en; Chinese Taipei	Ali Qasim; Iraq
Light welterweight (63.5 kg)	None awarded	Lai Chu-en; Chinese Taipei	Bunjong Sinsiri; Thailand
Light middleweight (71 kg)	Sewon Okazawa; Japan	Kan Chia-wei; Chinese Taipei	Baýramdurdy Nurmuhammedow; Turkmenistan
Light middleweight (71 kg)	Sewon Okazawa; Japan	Kan Chia-wei; Chinese Taipei	Aslanbek Shymbergenov; Kazakhstan
Light heavyweight (80 kg)	Tuohetaerbieke Tanglatihan; China	Eumir Marcial; Philippines	Turabek Khabibullaev; Uzbekistan
Light heavyweight (80 kg)	Tuohetaerbieke Tanglatihan; China	Eumir Marcial; Philippines	Ahmad Ghossoun; Syria
Heavyweight (92 kg)	Davlat Boltaev; Tajikistan	Han Xuezhen; China	Sagyndyk Togambay; Kazakhstan
Heavyweight (92 kg)	Davlat Boltaev; Tajikistan	Han Xuezhen; China	Jeong Jae-min; South Korea
Super heavyweight (+92 kg)	Bakhodir Jalolov; Uzbekistan	Kamshybek Kunkabayev; Kazakhstan	Narender Berwal; India
Super heavyweight (+92 kg)	Bakhodir Jalolov; Uzbekistan	Kamshybek Kunkabayev; Kazakhstan	Bayikewuzi Danabieke; China

=== Women ===
Event	Gold	Silver	Bronze
Light flyweight (50 kg)	Wu Yu; China	Chuthamat Raksat; Thailand	Oyuntsetsegiin Yesügen; Mongolia
Light flyweight (50 kg)	Wu Yu; China	Chuthamat Raksat; Thailand	Nikhat Zareen; India
Bantamweight (54 kg)	Pang Chol-mi; North Korea	Chang Yuan; China	Preeti Pawar; India
Bantamweight (54 kg)	Pang Chol-mi; North Korea	Chang Yuan; China	Nigina Uktamova; Uzbekistan
Featherweight (57 kg)	Lin Yu-ting; Chinese Taipei	Karina Ibragimova; Kazakhstan	Mijgona Samadova; Tajikistan
Featherweight (57 kg)	Lin Yu-ting; Chinese Taipei	Karina Ibragimova; Kazakhstan	None awarded
Lightweight (60 kg)	Yang Wenlu; China	Won Un-gyong; North Korea	Thananya Somnuek; Thailand
Lightweight (60 kg)	Yang Wenlu; China	Won Un-gyong; North Korea	Wu Shih-yi; Chinese Taipei
Welterweight (66 kg)	Yang Liu; China	Janjaem Suwannapheng; Thailand	Natalya Bogdanova; Kazakhstan
Welterweight (66 kg)	Yang Liu; China	Janjaem Suwannapheng; Thailand	Chen Nien-chin; Chinese Taipei
Middleweight (75 kg)	Li Qian; China	Lovlina Borgohain; India	Baison Manikon; Thailand
Middleweight (75 kg)	Li Qian; China	Lovlina Borgohain; India	Lưu Diễm Quỳnh; Vietnam

== Medal table ==
Rank	Nation	Gold	Silver	Bronze	Total
1	China (CHN)	5	2	2	9
2	Uzbekistan (UZB)	3	0	2	5
3	Chinese Taipei (TPE)	1	2	2	5
4	Japan (JPN)	1	1	1	3
4	North Korea (PRK)	1	1	1	3
6	Tajikistan (TJK)	1	0	1	2
7	Thailand (THA)	0	3	4	7
8	Kazakhstan (KAZ)	0	2	3	5
9	India (IND)	0	1	3	4
10	Philippines (PHI)	0	1	0	1
11	Iraq (IRQ)	0	0	1	1
11	Mongolia (MGL)	0	0	1	1
11	South Korea (KOR)	0	0	1	1
11	Syria (SYR)	0	0	1	1
11	Turkmenistan (TKM)	0	0	1	1
11	Vietnam (VIE)	0	0	1	1
Totals (16 entries)		12	13	25	50

== Participating nations ==
A total of 238 athletes from 38 nations competed in boxing at the 2022 Asian Games:

- Afghanistan (3)
- Bahrain (2)
- Bangladesh (3)
- Bhutan (3)
- China (13)
- Chinese Taipei (8)
- Hong Kong (1)
- India (13)
- Indonesia (5)
- Iran (5)
- Iraq (1)
- Japan (10)
- Jordan (8)
- Kazakhstan (13)
- Kuwait (4)
- Kyrgyzstan (7)
- Laos (4)
- Macau (1)
- Malaysia (2)
- Mongolia (13)
- Nepal (13)
- North Korea (9)
- Pakistan (4)
- Palestine (3)
- Philippines (10)
- Qatar (1)
- Saudi Arabia (6)
- Singapore (1)
- South Korea (13)
- Sri Lanka (2)
- Syria (2)
- Tajikistan (12)
- Thailand (11)
- Turkmenistan (4)
- United Arab Emirates (4)
- Uzbekistan (13)
- Vietnam (9)
- Yemen (2)
