= 2022 IBA Women's World Boxing Championships – Light middleweight =

Light middleweight at the 2022 IBA Women's World Boxing Championships
- Venue: Başakşehir Youth and Sports Facility
- Location: Istanbul, Turkey
- Dates: 9–19 May
- Competitors: 22 from 22 nations

Medalists
gold medal	Lisa O'Rourke	Ireland
silver medal	Alcinda Panguana	Mozambique
bronze medal	Sema Çalışkan	Turkey
bronze medal	Valentina Khalzova	Kazakhstan

The Light middleweight competition at the 2022 IBA Women's World Boxing Championships was held from 9 to 19 May 2022.

== Results ==
=== Finals ===
Semi-finals
(Turkey) Sema Çalışkan	0
(Republic of Ireland) Lisa O'Rourke	5
(Kazakhstan) Valentina Khalzova	0
(Mozambique) Alcinda Panguana	4

Final
(Republic of Ireland) Lisa O'Rourke	4
(Mozambique) Alcinda Panguana	1

=== Top half ===
==== Section 1 ====
Round of 32
(Germany) Leonie Müller	0
(United States) Morelle McCane	5

Round of 16
(Turkey) Sema Çalışkan	3
(United States) Morelle McCane	2
(Mongolia) Enkhbaataryn Erdenetuyaa	2
(Poland) Daria Parada	3

Quarterfinals
(Turkey) Sema Çalışkan	5
(Poland) Daria Parada	0

==== Section 2 ====
Round of 32
(Democratic Republic of the Congo) Brigitte Mbabi	0
(Republic of Ireland) Lisa O'Rourke	5
(Armenia) Ani Hovsepyan	RSC
(Ukraine) Mariia Siedaia

Round of 16
(Dominican Republic) María Moronta	0
(Republic of Ireland) Lisa O'Rourke	5
(Armenia) Ani Hovsepyan	5
(Japan) Arisa Tsubata	0

Quarterfinals
(Republic of Ireland) Lisa O'Rourke	5
(Armenia) Ani Hovsepyan	0

=== Bottom half ===
==== Section 3 ====
Round of 32
(Uzbekistan) Khadichabonu Abdullaeva	5
(Cayman Islands) Hepseba Angel	0
(Kenya) Lorna Kusa
(Kazakhstan) Valentina Khalzova	RSC

Round of 16
(Australia) Kaye Scott	5
(Uzbekistan) Khadichabonu Abdullaeva	0
(Kazakhstan) Valentina Khalzova	5
(South Korea) Seon Su-jin	0

Quarterfinals
(Australia) Kaye Scott	0
(Kazakhstan) Valentina Khalzova	5

==== Section 4 ====
Round of 32
(Chinese Taipei) Chen Nien-chin	2
(India) Lovlina Borgohain	3

Round of 16
(Mozambique) Alcinda Panguana	RSC
(Mexico) Brianda Cruz
(India) Lovlina Borgohain	1
Cindy Ngamba	4

Quarterfinals
(Mozambique) Alcinda Panguana	3
Cindy Ngamba	2
