= Boxing at the 2022 Asian Games – Women's 75 kg =

Boxing competitions

Women's 75 kg at the 2022 Asian Games
- Venue: Hangzhou Gymnasium
- Date: 26 September – 4 October 2023
- Competitors: 9 from 9 nations

Medalists
gold medal	Li Qian	China
silver medal	Lovlina Borgohain	India
bronze medal	Baison Manikon	Thailand
bronze medal	Lưu Diễm Quỳnh	Vietnam

The women's 75 kilograms event at the 2022 Asian Games took place from 24 September to 3 October 2023 at Hangzhou Gymnasium, Hangzhou, China.

The competition was a straight single-elimination tournament. Both semifinal losers were awarded bronze medals, so no boxers competed again after their first loss. Bouts consisted of three rounds each. Five judges scored each bout. Each round was scored on a 10-point basis.

Li Qian from the host nation won the gold medal.

== Schedule ==
All times are China Standard Time (UTC+08:00)

Date	Time	Event
Tuesday, 26 September 2023	14:00	Preliminaries – R16
Saturday, 30 September 2023	14:00	Quarterfinals
Tuesday, 3 October 2023	14:00	Semifinals
Wednesday, 4 October 2023	14:00	Final

== Results ==
Preliminaries – R16
Aziza Zokirova (UZB)	0
Baison Manikon (THA)	5

Quarterfinals
Enkhbaataryn Erdenetuyaa (MGL)	0
Baison Manikon (THA)	5
Seong Su-yeon (KOR)	0
Lovlina Borgohain (IND)	5
Valentina Khalzova (KAZ)	0
Li Qian (CHN)	5
Saraswati Rana (NEP)	1
Lưu Diễm Quỳnh (VIE)	4

Semifinals
Baison Manikon (THA)	0
Lovlina Borgohain (IND)	5
Li Qian (CHN)	5
Lưu Diễm Quỳnh (VIE)	0

Final
Lovlina Borgohain (IND)	0
Li Qian (CHN)	5
