= Yakushin =

Yakushin or Yakushyn (Russian: Якушин) is a Russian masculine surname, its feminine counterpart is Yakushina or Yakushyna. It may refer to

- Dmytro Yakushyn (born 1978), Ukrainian ice hockey player
- Mikhail Yakushin (1910–1997), Russian football coach and player
- Yaroslava Yakushina (born 1993), Russian boxer
