= Boxing at the 2010 South American Games – Women's 75kg =

The Women's 75 kg event at the 2010 South American Games had its semifinals held on March 22 and the final on March 27.

== Medalists ==
Gold	Silver	Bronze
Andreia Bandeira; Brazil	Celeste Peralta; Argentina	no medal

== Results ==
Semifinals
1	Celeste Peralta (ARG)
4	bye
3	Celinda Mejia Boya (ECU)	0
2	Andreia Bandeira (BRA)	11

Final
Celeste Peralta (ARG)	2
Andreia Bandeira (BRA)	11
