= 2016 AIBA Women's World Boxing Championships – Welterweight =

Boxing competitions

Welterweight at the 2016 AIBA Women's World Boxing Championships
- Dates: 20–27 May
- Competitors: 19 from 19 nations

Medalists
gold medal	Valentina Khalzova	Kazakhstan
silver medal	Gu Hong	China
bronze medal	Elina Gustafsson	Finland
bronze medal	Nadine Apetz	Germany

The Welterweight (69 kg) competition at the 2016 AIBA Women's World Boxing Championships was held from 20 to 27 May 2016.

== Draw ==
=== Preliminaries ===
	Result	
(Serbia) Jovana Vučić	1–2	(Australia) Jessica Messina
(South Korea) Noh Hee-min	TKO	(Kazakhstan) Valentina Khalzova
(India) Meena Rani	0–3	(Germany) Nadine Apetz

=== Main draw ===
Round of 16
22 May
(Russia) Saadat Abdulaeva	3
(Australia) Jessica Messina	0
22 May
(Finland) Elina Gustafsson	3
(Lithuania) Rūta Sutkutė	0
22 May
(Azerbaijan) Maryam Jabrayilova	2
(Mongolia) Enkhbaataryn Erdenetuya	1
22 May
(Turkey) Gülten Türker	0
(China) Gu Hong	3
22 May
(Uzbekistan) Shahnoza Nizamova	0
(Kazakhstan) Valentina Khalzova	3
22 May
(Republic of Ireland) Grainne Walsh	3
(Poland) Hanna Solecka	0
22 May
(United States) Naomi Graham	2
(Ukraine) Mariia Bova	1
22 May
(Germany) Nadine Apetz	3
(Hungary) Tímea Nagy	0

Quarterfinals
24 May
(Russia) Saadat Abdulaeva	1
(Finland) Elina Gustafsson	2
24 May
(Azerbaijan) Maryam Jabrayilova	0
(China) Gu Hong	3
24 May
(Kazakhstan) Valentina Khalzova	TKO
(Republic of Ireland) Grainne Walsh
24 May
(United States) Naomi Graham	0
(Germany) Nadine Apetz	3

Semifinals
26 May
(Finland) Elina Gustafsson	0
(China) Gu Hong	2
26 May
(Kazakhstan) Valentina Khalzova	3
(Germany) Nadine Apetz	0

Final
27 May
(China) Gu Hong	1
(Kazakhstan) Valentina Khalzova	2
