= Boxing at the 2016 Summer Olympics – Women's middleweight =

Boxing competitions

Women's middleweight boxing at the Games of the XXXI Olympiad
- Venue: Riocentro – Pavilion 6
- Date: 14–21 August 2016
- Competitors: 12 from 12 nations

Medalists
1st place, gold medalist(s)		Claressa Shields	United States
2nd place, silver medalist(s)		Nouchka Fontijn	Netherlands
3rd place, bronze medalist(s)		Dariga Shakimova	Kazakhstan
3rd place, bronze medalist(s)		Li Qian	China

The women's middleweight boxing competition at the 2016 Olympic Games in Rio de Janeiro was held from 14 to 21 August at the Riocentro.

The medals were presented by Wu Ching-kuo, Chinese Taipei, IOC member and President of the AIBA, and the gifts were presented by Franco Falcinelli, Vice President of the AIBA.

== Schedule ==
All times are Brasília Time (UTC−3).

Date	Time	Round
Sunday, 14 August 2016	11:00	Round of 16
Wednesday, 17 August 2016	14:30	Quarter-finals
Friday, 19 August 2016	15:30	Semi-finals
Sunday, 21 August 2016	14:00	Final

== Results ==
Round of 16
Yaroslava Yakushina (RUS)	3
Chen Nien-chin (TPE)	0
Dariga Shakimova (KAZ)	2
Ariane Fortin (CAN)	1
Andreia Bandeira (BRA)	2
Atheyna Bylon (PAN)	1
Anna Laurell Nash (SWE)	0
Savannah Marshall (GBR)	3

Quarter-finals
Claressa Shields (USA)	3
Yaroslava Yakushina (RUS)	0
Dariga Shakimova (KAZ)	3
Khadija El-Mardi (MAR)	0
Li Qian (CHN)	3
Andreia Bandeira (BRA)	0
Savannah Marshall (GBR)	0
Nouchka Fontijn (NED)	2

Semi-finals
Claressa Shields (USA)	3
Dariga Shakimova (KAZ)	0
Li Qian (CHN)	1
Nouchka Fontijn (NED)	2

Final
Claressa Shields (USA)	3
Nouchka Fontijn (NED)	0
