= 2017 Asian Women's Amateur Boxing Championships =

Boxing competitions

2017 Asian Women's Boxing Championships
- Host city: Ho Chi Minh City, Vietnam
- Dates: 2–10 November 2017
- Main venue: Nguyen Du Indoor Stadium

The eighth edition of the Women's Asian Amateur Boxing Championships were held from November 2 to 10, 2017 in Ho Chi Minh City, Vietnam.

== Medal summary ==
Event	Gold	Silver	Bronze
Light flyweight (48 kg)	Mary Kom; India	Kim Hyang-mi; North Korea	Tsubasa Komura; Japan
Light flyweight (48 kg)	Mary Kom; India	Kim Hyang-mi; North Korea	Ochirbatyn Jargalan; Mongolia
Flyweight (51 kg)	Nguyễn Thị Tâm; Vietnam	Pang Chol-mi; North Korea	Myagmardulamyn Nandintsetseg; Mongolia
Flyweight (51 kg)	Nguyễn Thị Tâm; Vietnam	Pang Chol-mi; North Korea	Nazym Kyzaibay; Kazakhstan
Bantamweight (54 kg)	Lin Yu-ting; Chinese Taipei	Lê Thị Bằng; Vietnam	Shiksha; India
Bantamweight (54 kg)	Lin Yu-ting; Chinese Taipei	Lê Thị Bằng; Vietnam	Kim Song-sim; North Korea
Featherweight (57 kg)	Yin Junhua; China	Sonia Lather; India	Huang Hsiao-wen; Chinese Taipei
Featherweight (57 kg)	Yin Junhua; China	Sonia Lather; India	Yodgoroy Mirzaeva; Uzbekistan
Lightweight (60 kg)	Oh Yeon-ji; South Korea	Lừu Thị Duyên; Vietnam	Priyanka Chaudhary; India
Lightweight (60 kg)	Oh Yeon-ji; South Korea	Lừu Thị Duyên; Vietnam	Choe Hye-song; North Korea
Light welterweight (64 kg)	Madina Nurshayeva; Kazakhstan	Dou Dan; China	Peamwilai Laopeam; Thailand
Light welterweight (64 kg)	Madina Nurshayeva; Kazakhstan	Dou Dan; China	Laishram Sarita Devi; India
Welterweight (69 kg)	Gu Hong; China	Valentina Khalzova; Kazakhstan	Trần Thị Linh; Vietnam
Welterweight (69 kg)	Gu Hong; China	Valentina Khalzova; Kazakhstan	Lovlina Borgohain; India
Middleweight (75 kg)	Li Qian; China	Seon Su-jin; South Korea	Dariga Shakimova; Kazakhstan
Middleweight (75 kg)	Li Qian; China	Seon Su-jin; South Korea	Chen Nien-chin; Chinese Taipei
Light heavyweight (81 kg)	Yang Xiaoli; China	Nguyễn Thị Hương; Vietnam	Moldir Bazarbayeva; Kazakhstan
Light heavyweight (81 kg)	Yang Xiaoli; China	Nguyễn Thị Hương; Vietnam	Ezozakhon Melieva; Uzbekistan
Heavyweight (+81 kg)	Guzal Ismatova; Uzbekistan	Trần Thị Oanh Nhi; Vietnam	Seema Punia; India
Heavyweight (+81 kg)	Guzal Ismatova; Uzbekistan	Trần Thị Oanh Nhi; Vietnam	Lazzat Kungeibayeva; Kazakhstan

== Medal table ==
Rank	Nation	Gold	Silver	Bronze	Total
1	China	4	1	0	5
2	Vietnam	1	4	1	6
3	India	1	1	5	7
4	Kazakhstan	1	1	4	6
5	South Korea	1	1	0	2
6	Chinese Taipei	1	0	2	3
6	Uzbekistan	1	0	2	3
8	North Korea	0	2	2	4
9	Mongolia	0	0	2	2
10	Japan	0	0	1	1
10	Thailand	0	0	1	1
Totals (11 entries)		10	10	20	40
