= IBA Women's World Boxing Championships =

Boxing competitions

- Status: active
- Genre: sports event
- Date: varying
- Frequency: biennial
- Location: various
- Inaugurated: 2001
- Organiser: IBA

The IBA Women's World Boxing Championships are biennial amateur boxing competitions organised by the International Boxing Association (IBA, previously known as AIBA), which is one of the governing bodies for amateur boxing, the other being World Boxing which organises its own championships. The first women's championships were held over 25 years later in 2001.

Since 1989 the women's championships were held in even years between 2006 and 2018 and switched to a nominal odd-year schedule in 2019.

== Weight classes ==
As of 1 August 2021, women are grouped into 12 weight classes as follows:

- 45–48 kg (Minimumweight)
- 48–50 kg (Light flyweight)
- 50–52 kg (Flyweight)
- 52–54 kg (Bantamweight)
- 54–57 kg (Featherweight)
- 57–60 kg (Lightweight)
- 60–63 kg (Light welterweight)
- 63–66 kg (Welterweight)
- 66–70 kg (Light middleweight)
- 70–75 kg (Middleweight)
- 75–81 kg (Light heavyweight)
- +81 kg (Heavyweight)

== Editions ==
Number	Year	Host	Dates	Venue	Events	Nations	Boxers
1	2001	Scranton, United States	24 November – 2 December		12	30	125
2	2002	Antalya, Turkey	21–27 October		12	35	185
3	2005	Podolsk, Russia	26 September – 2 October	Vityaz Ice Palace	13	30	139
4	2006	New Delhi, India	18–23 November	Talkatora Indoor Stadium	13	33	178
5	2008	Ningbo, China	22–29 November	Ningbo Sports Center	13	42	237
6	2010	Bridgetown, Barbados	10–18 September	Garfield Sobers Gymnasium	10	66	257
7	2012	Qinhuangdao, China	21 May – 3 June	Olympic Stadium	10	70	305
8	2014	Jeju City, South Korea	13–25 November	Halla Gymnasium	10	67	280
9	2016	Astana, Kazakhstan	19–27 May	Barys Arena	10	64	285
10	2018	New Delhi, India	15–24 November	KD Jadav Indoor Stadium	10	62	277
11	2019	Ulan-Ude, Russia	3–13 October	Physical Culture and Sports Complex	10	57	224
12	2022	Istanbul, Turkey	8–20 May	Başakşehir Youth and Sports Facility	12	73	310
13	2023	New Delhi, India	15–26 March	KD Jadav Indoor Stadium	12	65	324
14	2025	Niš, Serbia	8–17 March	Čair Sports Center	12	51	239

== All-time medal table (2001–2025) ==
Updated after the 2025 IBA Women's World Boxing Championships.

Rank	Nation	Gold	Silver	Bronze	Total
1	Russia (Note: 2001 finalist Natalya Kolpakova (71 kg, Russia) was disqualified for protest against judges' decision and stripped of her silver medal, which was not transferred to another athlete.)	29	13	28	70
2	China (Note: 2008 gold medalist Chen Ying (48 kg, China) was disqualified for doping. Sarah Ourahmoune (France) and Alexandra Kuleshova (Russia) were subsequently upgraded to gold and silver respectively.)	22	17	23	62
3	India	14	8	21	43
4	Turkey	12	11	18	41
5	North Korea	9	7	12	28
6	United States	8	9	22	39
7	Kazakhstan	8	9	18	35
8	Canada	8	3	17	28
9	Ireland	8	3	1	12
10	Italy	5	6	4	15
11	Chinese Taipei	5	0	2	7
12	France	4	3	8	15
13	Ukraine	3	7	10	20
14	Hungary	3	5	11	19
15	Sweden	3	2	6	11
16	Brazil	3	1	4	8
17	Philippines	2	2	7	11
18	Morocco	2	1	3	6
19	England	1	6	4	11
20	Romania	1	5	8	14
21	Poland	1	4	7	12
22	Bulgaria	1	2	4	7
23	Belarus	1	1	4	6
24	Panama	1	1	0	2
25	Serbia	1	0	5	6
26	Germany	1	0	2	3
27	Great Britain	1	0	1	2
27	Wales	1	0	1	2
29	Lithuania	1	0	0	1
30	Thailand	0	6	8	14
31	Colombia	0	4	2	6
32	Australia	0	3	5	8
32	Netherlands	0	3	5	8
34	Norway	0	3	1	4
35	Argentina	0	2	3	5
36	Azerbaijan	0	2	2	4
37	Uzbekistan	0	1	6	7
38	Denmark	0	1	5	6
39	Greece	0	1	2	3
39	Mongolia	0	1	2	3
39	Vietnam	0	1	2	3
42	Algeria	0	1	1	2
42	Mozambique	0	1	1	2
44	Jamaica	0	1	0	1
44	Switzerland	0	1	0	1
46	Finland	0	0	4	4
46	Japan	0	0	4	4
48	South Korea	0	0	3	3
49	Egypt	0	0	2	2
49	Moldova	0	0	2	2
51	Kosovo	0	0	1	1
51	New Zealand	0	0	1	1
51	Slovakia	0	0	1	1
51	Spain	0	0	1	1
51	Tajikistan	0	0	1	1
51	Tunisia	0	0	1	1
Totals (56 entries)		159	158	317	634

== Multiple gold medalists ==
Boldface denotes active boxers and highest medal count among all boxers (including these who are not included in these tables) per type. In 2018, Mary Kom defeated Ukrainian boxer Hanna Okhota with a 5–0 win in the 48 kg weight category, she is now tied with Cuban legend Felix Savon’s haul of six golds.

Rank	Boxer	Country	Weights	From	To	Gold	Silver	Bronze	Total
1	Mary Kom	India	48 kg / 45 kg / 46 kg / 51 kg	2001	2019	**6**	1	1	**8**
2	Katie Taylor	Ireland	60 kg	2006	2016	5	–	1	6
3	Irina Sinetskaya	Russia	67 kg / 66 kg / 80 kg / +81 kg	2001	2012	3	1	1	5
4	Yang Xiaoli	China	81 kg / +81 kg	2014	2019	3	1	–	4
5	**Nazym Kyzaibay**	Kazakhstan	48 kg	2012	2025	3	–	1	4
5	Mary Spencer	Canada	66 kg / 75 kg	2005	2010	3	–	1	4
7	Simona Galassi	Italy	51 kg / 50 kg	2001	2005	3	–	–	3
7	Ren Cancan	China	52 kg / 51 kg	2008	2012	3	–	–	3
7	**Busenaz Sürmeneli**	Turkey	69 kg / 66 kg	2019	2025	3	–	–	3
10	Mária Kovács	Hungary	90 kg / 86 kg / 75 kg	2001	2010	2	2	1	5

== See also ==
- List of medalists at the IBA World Boxing Championships
- List of medalists at the IBA Women's World Boxing Championships
