= Andrei Vittenberg =

Russia-French ice hockey forward

- Born: September 30, 1965 (age 60) Moscow, Russian SFSR, Soviet Union
- Height: 5 ft 10 in (178 cm)
- Weight: 176 lb (80 kg; 12 st 8 lb)
- Position: Forward
- Shot: Left
- Played for: Dynamo Kharkiv; Torpedo Yaroslavl; Dragons de Rouen; Brest Albatros Hockey
- National team: France
- Playing career: 1984–1997

Andrei Vittenberg (born September 30, 1965) is a Russian-born French former professional ice hockey forward.

Vittenberg played in the Soviet Hockey League for Torpedo Yaroslavl before moving to France in 1991 to sign for Dragons de Rouen. In 1993, he joined Brest Albatros Hockey and played for four seasons until his retirement in 1997.

During his spell in France, Vittenberg became a French citizen and played in the 1994 Men's World Ice Hockey Championships for the France national team.
