= 2023 IBA Women's World Boxing Championships =

Boxing tournament in New Delhi

- Venue: K. D. Jadhav Indoor Hall
- Location: New Delhi, India
- Dates: 15–26 March
- Competitors: 324 from 65 nations
- Total prize money: $2.4 million

The 2023 IBA Women's World Boxing Championships were the 13th edition of the championships, held in New Delhi, India from 15 to 26 March 2023. India topped the medal tally for the first time after 2006.

Medal winners were awarded prize money; gold medallists earn $100,000, silver medallists $50,000, and bronze medallists $25,000. The overall prize fund was $2.4 million.

This event was boycotted by multiple nations due to participation of athletes from Russia and Belarus during the ongoing Russian invasion of Ukraine.

== Qualification System for Paris 2024 ==
In June 2022, the International Olympic Committee (IOC) barred the International Boxing Association's (IBA) rights to run and organize the tournament due to "continuing irregularity issues in the areas of finance, governance, ethics, refereeing, and judging". Hence, the IOC executive board established and ratified a new qualification system for Paris 2024 that would witness the boxers obtain the quota spots through the continental multisport events, reducing the complexity of the process. The qualification period commences at five regional multisport events in the middle of the 2023 season (2023 African Games in Accra, Ghana; 2022 Asian Games in Hangzhou, China; 2023 European Games in Poland; 2023 Pacific Games in Honiara, Solomon Islands; and the 2023 Pan American Games in Santiago, Chile), set to be served as continental qualifying meets, where a total of 139 spots will be assigned to a specific number of highest-ranked boxers in each weight category. For these reasons, this tournament does not give a quota for the Olympic Games.

== Schedule ==
All times are local (UTC+5:30).

Date	Time	Phase
16–21 March	14:00	Preliminaries
16–21 March	18:00	Preliminaries
22 March	14:00	Quarterfinals
22 March	18:00	Quarterfinals
23 March	18:00	Semifinals
25–26 March	18:00	Finals

== Medal summary ==
=== Medal table ===
* Host nation (India)

Rank	Nation	Gold	Silver	Bronze	Total
1	India*	4	0	0	4
2	China	3	1	3	7
3	Russia	1	1	1	3
4	Italy	1	1	0	2
5	Brazil	1	0	1	2
5	Morocco	1	0	1	2
7	Chinese Taipei	1	0	0	1
8	Kazakhstan	0	2	4	6
9	Colombia	0	2	2	4
10	Australia	0	2	1	3
11	Mongolia	0	1	1	2
11	Thailand	0	1	1	2
13	Vietnam	0	1	0	1
14	France	0	0	3	3
15	Azerbaijan	0	0	1	1
15	Belarus	0	0	1	1
15	Bulgaria	0	0	1	1
15	Japan	0	0	1	1
15	South Korea	0	0	1	1
15	Uzbekistan	0	0	1	1
Totals (20 entries)		12	12	24	48

=== Medal events ===
Event	Gold	Silver	Bronze
Minimumweight	Nitu Ghanghas; India	Lutsaikhany Altantsetseg; Mongolia	Alua Balkibekova; Kazakhstan
Minimumweight	Nitu Ghanghas; India	Lutsaikhany Altantsetseg; Mongolia	Yasmine Moutaqui; Morocco
Light flyweight	Nikhat Zareen; India	Nguyễn Thị Tâm; Vietnam	Ingrit Valencia; Colombia
Light flyweight	Nikhat Zareen; India	Nguyễn Thị Tâm; Vietnam	Wassila Lkhadiri; France
Flyweight	Wu Yu; China	Sirine Charaabi; Italy	Yuliya Apanasovich; Belarus
Flyweight	Wu Yu; China	Sirine Charaabi; Italy	Rinka Kinoshita; Japan
Bantamweight	Huang Hsiao-wen; Chinese Taipei	Yeni Arias; Colombia	Jutamas Jitpong; Thailand
Bantamweight	Huang Hsiao-wen; Chinese Taipei	Yeni Arias; Colombia	Möngöntsetsegiin Enkhjargal; Mongolia
Featherweight	Irma Testa; Italy	Karina Ibragimova; Kazakhstan	Amina Zidani; France
Featherweight	Irma Testa; Italy	Karina Ibragimova; Kazakhstan	Svetlana Staneva (Note: The original bronze medalist, Lin Yu-ting from Chinese Taipei, has been disqualified from the IBA Women's World Boxing Championships after failing to meet gender eligibility rules.); Bulgaria
Lightweight	Beatriz Ferreira; Brazil	Angie Valdés; Colombia	Oh Yeon-ji; South Korea
Lightweight	Beatriz Ferreira; Brazil	Angie Valdés; Colombia	Yang Wenlu; China
Light welterweight	Yang Chengyu; China	Nataliya Sychugova; Russia	Camila Camilo; Colombia
Light welterweight	Yang Chengyu; China	Nataliya Sychugova; Russia	Fatia Benmessahel; France
Welterweight	Yang Liu; China	Janjaem Suwannapheng (Note: The original finalist, Algeria's Imane Khelif, was disqualified from the IBA Women's World Boxing Championships three days after defeating Azalia Amineva, a previously-unbeaten Russian boxer. The Russian-led IBA claimed, without evidence, that Khelif had failed a gender test. Khelif was born female.); Thailand	Navbakhor Khamidova; Uzbekistan
Welterweight	Yang Liu; China	Janjaem Suwannapheng; Thailand	Nadezhda Ryabets; Kazakhstan
Light middleweight	Anastasiia Demurchian; Russia	Kaye Scott; Australia	Zhou Pan; China
Light middleweight	Anastasiia Demurchian; Russia	Kaye Scott; Australia	Bárbara Santos; Brazil
Middleweight	Lovlina Borgohain; India	Caitlin Parker; Australia	Li Qian; China
Middleweight	Lovlina Borgohain; India	Caitlin Parker; Australia	Valentina Khalzova; Kazakhstan
Light heavyweight	Saweety Boora; India	Wang Lina; China	Emma-Sue Greentree; Australia
Light heavyweight	Saweety Boora; India	Wang Lina; China	Fariza Sholtay; Kazakhstan
Heavyweight	Khadija El-Mardi; Morocco	Lazzat Kungeibayeva; Kazakhstan	Diana Pyatak; Russia
Heavyweight	Khadija El-Mardi; Morocco	Lazzat Kungeibayeva; Kazakhstan	Aynur Rzayeva; Azerbaijan

== Participating nations ==
The following nations participate with total participation entries of 324:

- Afghanistan (2)
- Algeria (6)
- Armenia (6)
- Australia (9)
- Azerbaijan (6)
- Belarus (6)
- Botswana (3)
- Brazil (7)
- Bulgaria (6)
- Cameroon (1)
- Cape Verde (1)
- China (12)
- Chinese Taipei (9)
- Colombia (9)
- Croatia (1)
- Dominican Republic (3)
- Eswatini (1)
- Federated States of Micronesia (1)
- France (9)
- French Polynesia (1)
- Greece (2)
- Guatemala (3)
- Guyana (2)
- Haiti (1)
- Hungary (8)
- India (12) Host
- Italy (8)
- Japan (8)
- Jordan (1)
- Kazakhstan (12)
- Kenya (11)
- Kuwait (1)
- Mali (1)
- Mexico (8)
- Moldova (2)
- Mongolia (8)
- Morocco (4)
- Mozambique (4)
- Nepal (7)
- Netherlands (1) (Note: Megan de Cler was the lone boxer from the Netherlands at the WWCH 2023 competing under IBA flag. While interacting with media on March 17 after her bout, she told ,"I am not playing for the Netherlands, I am here on my own. I don't do politics, I do boxing that's why I'm here".)
- New Zealand (6)
- Panama (1)
- Philippines (3)
- Puerto Rico (4)
- Romania (4)
- Russia (12)
- Saint Lucia (1)
- Serbia (7)
- Sierra Leone (1)
- Singapore (5)
- Slovakia (3)
- South Africa (3)
- South Korea (8)
- Spain (5)
- Sri Lanka (2)
- Tajikistan (4)
- Tanzania (2)
- Thailand (9)
- Trinidad and Tobago (3)
- Tunisia (3)
- Turkey (12)
- Turkmenistan (1)
- Uzbekistan (10)
- Venezuela (4)
- Vietnam (9)

== Controversies ==
=== Boycott due to participation of athletes from Russia and Belarus ===
Ignoring Russia's full-scale invasion of Ukraine in February 2022 and subsequent recommendations of the International Olympic Committee to bar Russian and Belarusian athletes from competing under their national flags and for the anthems to be played, the International Boxing Association under the leadership of Russian Umar Kremlev allowed them to compete with no restrictions. In the aftermath, 17 countries (19 national federations) decided to boycott the championship over IBA's decision.

The nations that boycotted the tournament were:

- Argentina
- Canada
- Czech Republic
- Denmark
- Finland
- Great Britain
  - England
  - Scotland
  - Wales
- Iceland
- Ireland
- Latvia
- Lithuania
- Netherlands
- Norway
- Poland
- Sweden
- Switzerland
- Ukraine
- United States

=== Alleged discrimination of Kosovo boxer ===
Kosovo withdrew its competitors from the championship as a result of alleged discrimination by the Indian authorities. Despite the Kosovo Boxing Federation being a full member of the IBA, local organisers decided to ban the use of the flag and national anthem of Kosovo at the championship, including in medal ceremonies and on team uniforms for political reasons. Kosovo's sole entrant, 2022 bronze medalist Donjeta Sadiku, also encountered problems in obtaining a visa to enter India for the competition. Sadiku was previously denied entry to India in 2017 for the Youth Women's World Championships and 2018 for the Women's World Championships. Kosovo's president Vjosa Osmani described the treatment of athletes from her country as a "blatant violation of int'l sporting standards" and urged the organisers to reconsider their decision. The IBA's media communications team termed the incident as "unfortunate and the Indian government was also very cooperative, and the team was granted visas for the competitions. It was unfortunate to learn that the athletes of Kosovo declined the opportunity to come to New Delhi."

=== Nepali Boxer Anjani Teli ===
A question was raised against Indian-born Nepali boxer Anjani Teli, on the subject of her passport. People believed she owned an Indian passport yet was competing for Nepal, leading to IBA holding an investigation on the allegations made against her. However, she was given a clean chit as she had never acquired an Indian passport. She was born in Delhi to migrated Nepali parents, and she received a Nepali passport at the age of 8 years as her parents were from Nepal. IBA then allowed her to continue participating in the tournament.

== See also ==
- IBA World Boxing Championships
- International Boxing Association
