= Andreia Bandeira =

Brazilian boxer

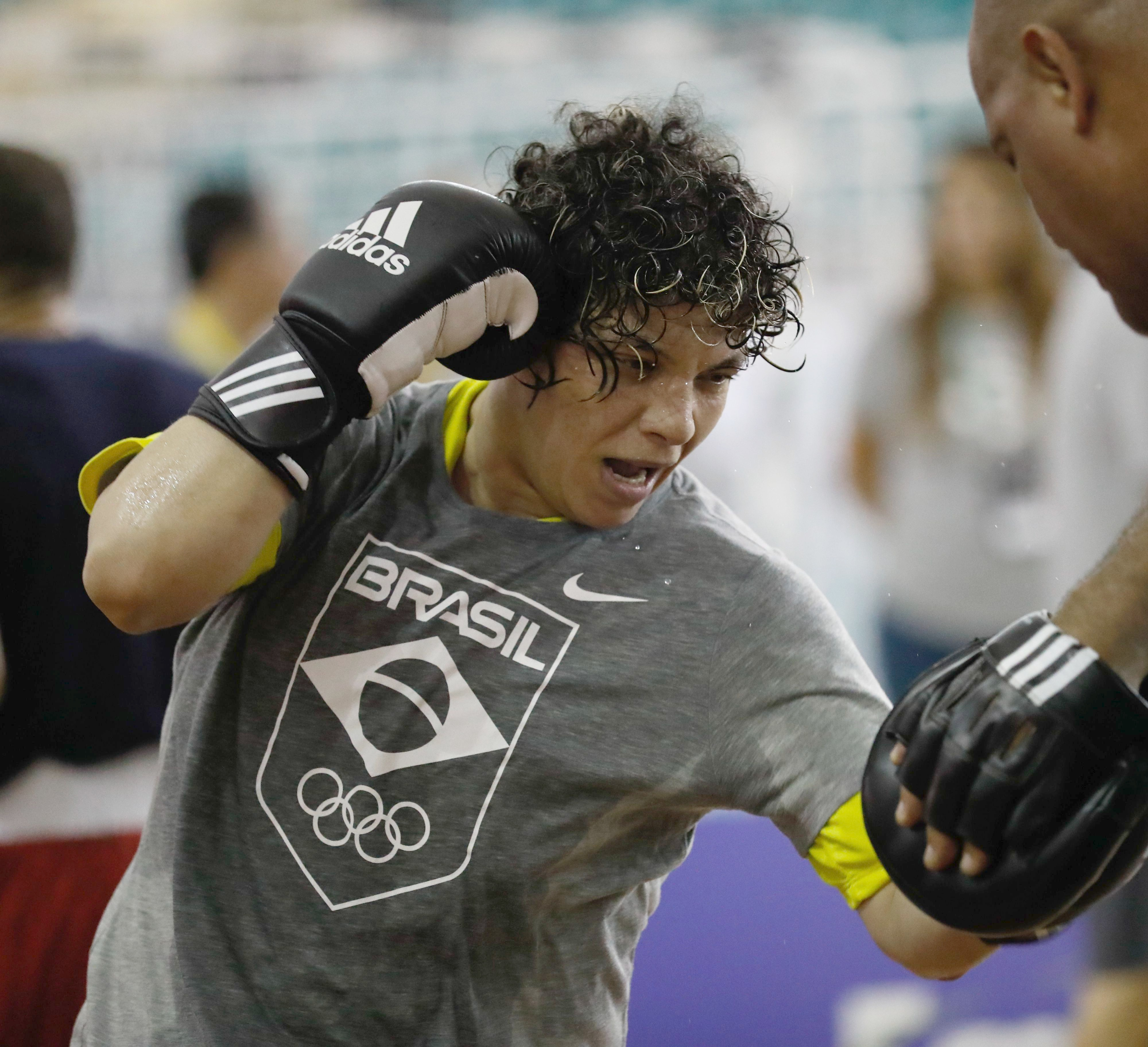
- Bandeira in 2016

Personal information
- Born: 3 May 1987 (age 39) São Paulo, Brazil
- Height: 169 cm (5 ft 7 in)

Sport
- Sport: Boxing
- Club: Centro Olímpico de Treinamento e Pesquisa
- Coached by: Messias Gomes
Medal record
Representing Brazil
South American Games
Gold medal – first place	2010 Sabaneta	-75 kg

Andreia Bandeira (born 3 May 1987) is a Brazilian amateur boxer who competes in the 75–76 kg weight division. She won a gold medal at the 2010 South American Games and qualified for the 2016 Summer Olympics, where she lost in the quarterfinals against China's Li Qian.
