= Yang Liu (boxer) =

Chinese boxer (born 1992)

Personal information
- Nationality: Chinese
- Born: 20 May 1992 (age 34) Chifeng, Inner Mongolia, China
- Height: 178 cm (5 ft 10 in)

Boxing career
- Weight class: Welterweight

Boxing record
- Total fights: 4
- Wins: 4
- Win by KO: 0
- Losses: 0
- Draws: 0
- No contests: 0
Medal record
Women's amateur boxing
Representing China
Olympic Games
Silver medal – second place	2024 Paris	Welterweight
World Championships
Gold medal – first place	2023 New Delhi	Welterweight
Silver medal – second place	2019 Ulan-Ude	Welterweight
Asian Games
Gold medal – first place	2022 Hangzhou	Welterweight

Yang Liu (Chinese: 杨柳; pinyin: Yáng Liǔ; born 20 May 1992) is a Chinese boxer. Yang won a medal at the 2019 AIBA Women's World Boxing Championships. The reigning Welterweight World Champion of 2023, she represented China at the 2024 Summer Olympics and won three fights to make it through to the final where she lost to Imane Khelif, therefore taking the silver medal.
