= Baison Manikon =

Thai boxer (born 2001)

Personal information
- Nationality: Thai
- Born: 7 November 2001 (age 25) Mueang Kalasin District, Kalasin Province, Northeast Thailand

Sport
- Sport: Boxing
Medal record
Women's amateur boxing
Representing Thailand
Asian Games
Bronze medal – third place	2022 Hangzhou	Middleweight
Asian Championships
Silver medal – second place	2022 Amman	Light middleweight
Silver medal – second place	2024 Chiang Mai	Light middleweight
Southeast Asian Games
Gold medal – first place	2023 Cambodia	Middleweight
Gold medal – first place	2025 Thailand	Light middleweight

Baison Manikon (Thai: ใบสน มณีก้อน, born 7 November 2001) is a Thai boxer. She competed in the women's welterweight event at the 2020 Summer Olympics.

In 2022, she became a presenter for Under Armour in Thailand.

== Biography ==
Manikon (nicknamed: cream) was born in the boxing and fruit trading family. Her father owned a small Muay Thai gym. As a child, she was debilitated from asthma and allergy illnesses, for this reason, she turned to boxing starting with Muay Thai with father as a trainer. When she was 10, she began to be a female amateur Muay Thai boxer patrolling various tournaments in the region. With versatility beyond age, therefore she was given the opportunity to compete in "Thai Fight" in the name of "Mungkornkhao Pollamai-Plaked Gym" (มังกรขาว ผลไม้ปลากัดยิม) under her father stable.

Later, she was persuaded to switch to amateur boxing from Somchai Poonsawat a technical director of Thailand Boxing Association, who has followed her in many bouts. The 2020 Summer Olympics was her first major tournament after only three years of amateur boxing.

In the 2024 Summer Olympics, she competed in the women's 75 kg (middleweight) event. In the first stage (round of 16), she lost to Cindy Ngamba the EOR boxer with a landslide score of 0–5. She is the fifth Thai boxer to be eliminated out of a total of eight men and women.
