= Anna Lysenko =

Ukrainian boxer (born 1991)

Personal information
- Nationality: Ukrainian
- Born: 22 December 1991 (age 34)

Boxing career
- Weight class: Welterweight
Medal record
Representing Ukraine
Women's boxing
European Amateur Boxing Championships
Silver medal – second place	2019 Sofia	69 kg

Anna Lysenko (Ukrainian: Анна Лисенко, born 22 December 1991) is a Ukrainian boxer.

== Career ==
She represented Ukraine at the 2016 World Championships and the 2020 Summer Olympics in Tokyo. Lysenko was the only female boxing Olympian from Ukraine at the 2020 Summer Olympics.

She studied law in the Academy of Advocacy of Ukraine in Kyiv.

In the 2019 Women's European Amateur Boxing Championships in Alcobendas, Madrid she reached quarterfinals.

As an athlete, Lysenko represents the Central sports club of the Armed Forces of Ukraine during qualification to the 2020 Summer Olympics.

In an interview to "Utro Doma" Lysenko said that she started her boxing career at 17 and her first coach was Oleksandr Salenko who trained her about 12–13 years.
