= 2016 AIBA Women's World Boxing Championships =

Boxing competitions

- Location: Astana, Kazakhstan
- Start date: 19 May
- End date: 27 May

The 2016 AIBA Women's World Boxing Championships was held at Astana, Kazakhstan and took place between 19 and 27 May 2016.

== Medal summary ==
=== Medal table ===
Rank	Nation	Gold	Silver	Bronze	Total
1	Kazakhstan (KAZ)	4	0	2	6
2	China (CHN)	2	2	2	6
3	United States (USA)	1	1	3	5
4	England (ENG)	1	0	1	2
4	France (FRA)	1	0	1	2
6	Italy (ITA)	1	0	0	1
7	Australia (AUS)	0	1	1	2
7	Bulgaria (BUL)	0	1	1	2
7	Ireland (IRL)	0	1	1	2
10	India (IND)	0	1	0	1
10	Netherlands (NED)	0	1	0	1
10	Russia (RUS)	0	1	0	1
10	Thailand (THA)	0	1	0	1
14	Finland (FIN)	0	0	2	2
14	Turkey (TUR)	0	0	2	2
16	Canada (CAN)	0	0	1	1
16	Chinese Taipei (TPE)	0	0	1	1
16	Germany (GER)	0	0	1	1
16	North Korea (PRK)	0	0	1	1
Totals (19 entries)		10	10	20	40

=== Medalists ===
Event	Gold	Silver	Bronze
Light flyweight (45–48 kg)	Nazym Kyzaibay (KAZ)	Wang Yuyan (CHN)	Marlen Esparza (USA)
Light flyweight (45–48 kg)	Nazym Kyzaibay (KAZ)	Wang Yuyan (CHN)	U Yong-gum (PRK)
Flyweight (51 kg)	Nicola Adams (ENG)	Peamwilai Laopeam (THA)	Zhaina Shekerbekova (KAZ)
Flyweight (51 kg)	Nicola Adams (ENG)	Peamwilai Laopeam (THA)	Sarah Ourahmoune (FRA)
Bantamweight (54 kg)	Dina Zholaman (KAZ)	Stoyka Petrova (BUL)	Christina Cruz (USA)
Bantamweight (54 kg)	Dina Zholaman (KAZ)	Stoyka Petrova (BUL)	Liu Piaopiao (CHN)
Featherweight (57 kg)	Alessia Mesiano (ITA)	Sonia Lather (IND)	Denitsa Eliseeva (BUL)
Featherweight (57 kg)	Alessia Mesiano (ITA)	Sonia Lather (IND)	Aizhan Khojabekova (KAZ)
Lightweight (60 kg)	Estelle Mossely (FRA)	Anastasiia Beliakova (RUS)	Katie Taylor (IRL)
Lightweight (60 kg)	Estelle Mossely (FRA)	Anastasiia Beliakova (RUS)	Mira Potkonen (FIN)
Light welterweight (64 kg)	Yang Wenlu (CHN)	Kellie Harrington (IRL)	Sara Kali (CAN)
Light welterweight (64 kg)	Yang Wenlu (CHN)	Kellie Harrington (IRL)	Skye Nicolson (AUS)
Welterweight (69 kg)	Valentina Khalzova (KAZ)	Gu Hong (CHN)	Elina Gustafsson (FIN)
Welterweight (69 kg)	Valentina Khalzova (KAZ)	Gu Hong (CHN)	Nadine Apetz (GER)
Middleweight (75 kg)	Claressa Shields (USA)	Nouchka Fontijn (NED)	Chen Nien-chin (TPE)
Middleweight (75 kg)	Claressa Shields (USA)	Nouchka Fontijn (NED)	Savannah Marshall (ENG)
Light heavyweight (81 kg)	Yang Xiaoli (CHN)	Kaye Scott (AUS)	Franchon Crews (USA)
Light heavyweight (81 kg)	Yang Xiaoli (CHN)	Kaye Scott (AUS)	Elif Güneri (TUR)
Heavyweight (+81 kg)	Lazzat Kungeibayeva (KAZ)	Shadasia Green (USA)	Şennur Demir (TUR)
Heavyweight (+81 kg)	Lazzat Kungeibayeva (KAZ)	Shadasia Green (USA)	Wang Shijin (CHN)
