= Alcinda Panguana =

Mozambican boxer (born 1994)

Personal information
- Nationality: Mozambican
- Born: 27 February 1994 (age 32)

Boxing career
- Weight class: Light middleweight
Medal record
Women's amateur boxing
Representing Mozambique
World Championships
Silver medal – second place	2022 Istanbul	Light middleweight
African Games
Silver medal – second place	2019 Rabat	Welterweight
Silver medal – second place	2023 Accra	Light middleweight

Alcinda Helena Panguana (born 27 February 1994, in Maputo) is a boxer from Mozambique. She competed in the women's welterweight event at the 2020 Summer Olympics. She won against Elizabeth Akinyi in the Round of 16. She lost to China's Gu Hong in the quarterfinals.
