= 2019 AIBA Women's World Boxing Championships =

Boxing competitions

- Venue: FSK Sports Complex
- Location: Ulan-Ude, Russia
- Dates: 3–13 October
- Competitors: 224 from 57 nations

The 2019 AIBA Women's World Boxing Championships were held in Ulan-Ude, Russia from 3 to 13 October 2019.

== Medal summary ==
=== Medal table ===
* Host nation (Russia)

Rank	Nation	Gold	Silver	Bronze	Total
1	Russia*	3	1	2	6
2	China	1	3	1	5
3	Turkey	1	2	0	3
4	United States	1	0	2	3
5	Chinese Taipei	1	0	1	2
6	Brazil	1	0	0	1
6	Philippines	1	0	0	1
6	Wales	1	0	0	1
9	India	0	1	3	4
10	France	0	1	0	1
10	Italy	0	1	0	1
10	Netherlands	0	1	0	1
13	England	0	0	2	2
13	Kazakhstan	0	0	2	2
15	Belarus	0	0	1	1
15	Canada	0	0	1	1
15	Finland	0	0	1	1
15	Morocco	0	0	1	1
15	North Korea	0	0	1	1
15	Thailand	0	0	1	1
15	Vietnam	0	0	1	1
Totals (21 entries)		10	10	20	40

=== Medal events ===
Event	Gold	Silver	Bronze
Light flyweight	Ekaterina Paltceva; Russia	Manju Rani; India	Demie-Jade Resztan; England
Light flyweight	Ekaterina Paltceva; Russia	Manju Rani; India	Chuthamat Raksat; Thailand
Flyweight	Liliya Aetbaeva; Russia	Buse Naz Çakıroğlu; Turkey	Pang Chol-mi; North Korea
Flyweight	Liliya Aetbaeva; Russia	Buse Naz Çakıroğlu; Turkey	Mary Kom; India
Bantamweight	Huang Hsiao-wen; Chinese Taipei	Caroline Cruveillier; France	Jamuna Boro; India
Bantamweight	Huang Hsiao-wen; Chinese Taipei	Caroline Cruveillier; France	Mikiah Kreps; United States
Featherweight	Nesthy Petecio; Philippines	Liudmila Vorontsova; Russia	Karriss Artingstall; England
Featherweight	Nesthy Petecio; Philippines	Liudmila Vorontsova; Russia	Lin Yu-ting; Chinese Taipei
Lightweight	Beatriz Ferreira; Brazil	Wang Cong; China	Rashida Ellis; United States
Lightweight	Beatriz Ferreira; Brazil	Wang Cong; China	Mira Potkonen; Finland
Light welterweight	Dou Dan; China	Angela Carini; Italy	Ekaterina Dynnik; Russia
Light welterweight	Dou Dan; China	Angela Carini; Italy	Milana Safronova; Kazakhstan
Welterweight	Busenaz Sürmeneli; Turkey	Yang Liu; China	Saadat Dalgatova; Russia
Welterweight	Busenaz Sürmeneli; Turkey	Yang Liu; China	Lovlina Borgohain; India
Middleweight	Lauren Price; Wales	Nouchka Fontijn; Netherlands	Khadija El-Mardi; Morocco
Middleweight	Lauren Price; Wales	Nouchka Fontijn; Netherlands	Tammara Thibeault; Canada
Light heavyweight	Zemfira Magomedalieva; Russia	Elif Güneri; Turkey	Wang Lina; China
Light heavyweight	Zemfira Magomedalieva; Russia	Elif Güneri; Turkey	Nguyễn Thị Hương; Vietnam
Heavyweight	Danielle Perkins; United States	Yang Xiaoli; China	Katsiaryna Kavaleva; Belarus
Heavyweight	Danielle Perkins; United States	Yang Xiaoli; China	Dina Islambekova; Kazakhstan
