= Angela Carini =

Italian boxer (born 1998)

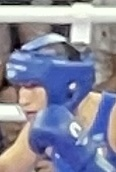
- Carini in 2024, during her match against Imane Khelif

Personal information
- Born: 6 October 1998 (age 28) Naples, Italy
- Height: 1.71 m (5 ft 7 in)

Boxing career
- Weight class: Light welterweight
- Stance: Southpaw

Boxing record
- Total fights: 108
- Wins: 84
- Win by KO: 4
- Losses: 23
- Draws: 0
- No contests: 0
Medal record
Women's amateur boxing
Representing Italy
World Championships
Silver medal – second place	2019 Ulan-Ude	Light welterweight
European Championships
Silver medal – second place	2019 Alcobendas	Welterweight

Angela Carini (born 6 October 1998) is an Italian amateur boxer.

== Career ==
Carini won a medal at the 2019 AIBA Women's World Boxing Championships.

She competed in the women's welterweight division at the 2020 Summer Olympics in Tokyo and was defeated in the round of 16 by Chen Nien-chin.

=== 2024 Summer Olympics ===
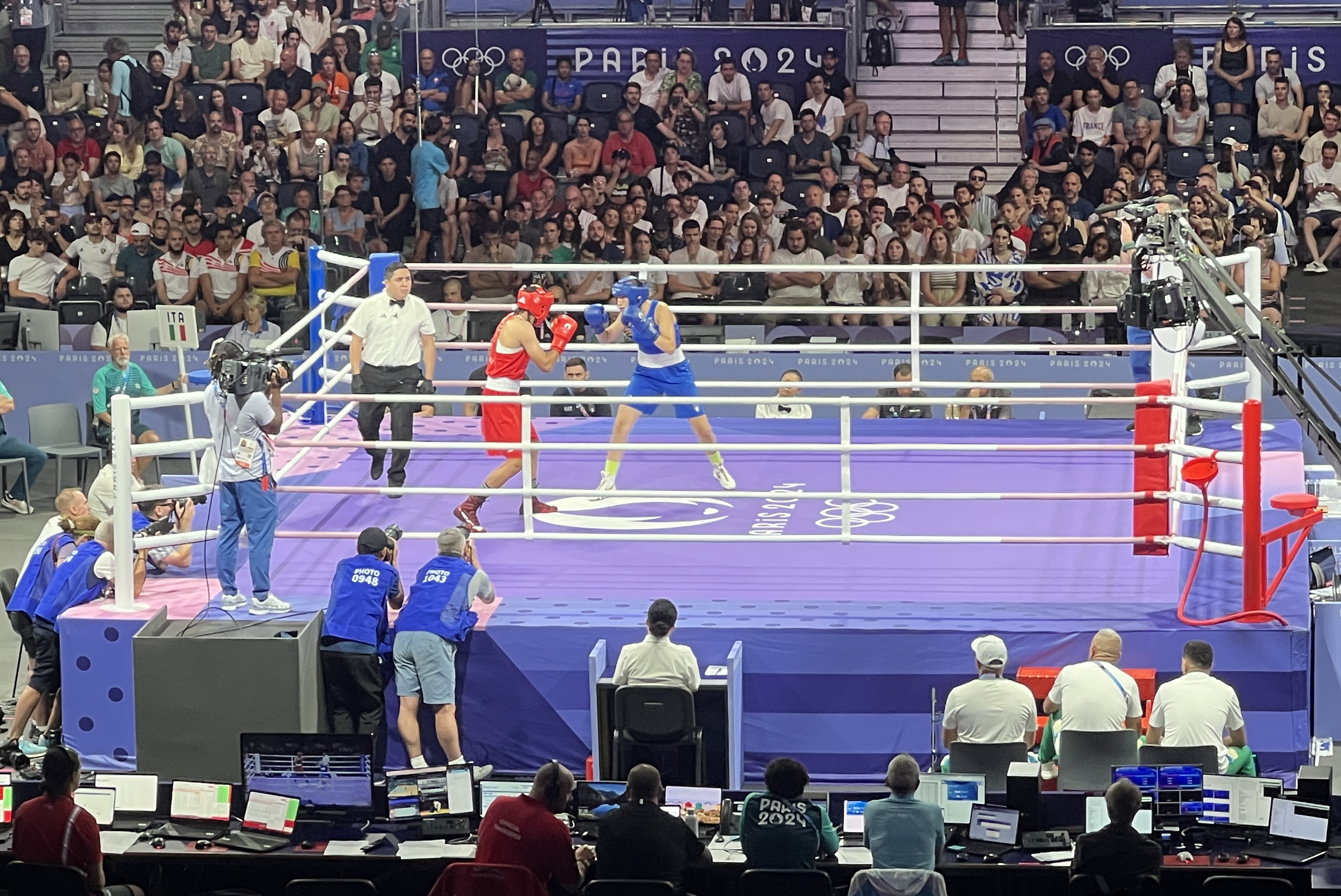
Carini (blue) and Khelif during their second-round fight at the 2024 Summer Olympics

Carini competed in the women's 66 kg division at the 2024 Summer Olympics in Paris.

On 1 August, she faced Imane Khelif in a bout that sparked intense debate within the boxing community. During the match, Carini, after receiving a punch in the face, signalled for her headgear to be checked and eventually withdrew from the fight after 46 seconds. Carini's reaction to abandoning the boxing match spawned scrutiny.

Carini's coach later commented on concerns regarding her safety, highlighting the controversy surrounding the International Olympic Committee (IOC)'s decision to allow Khelif to compete. The IOC, however, defended their decision to allow both her and Lin Yu-ting to compete, criticizing the International Boxing Association (IBA)'s disqualification of them from a 2023 competition as "sudden and arbitrary".

Carini later apologised to Khelif, stating: "I want to apologise to her and everyone else. I was angry because my Olympics had gone up in smoke. I don't have anything against Khelif. If I were to meet her again, I would embrace her." The day after the fight, the IBA decided to offer Carini a sum of $100,000, the same amount of prize money typically reserved for the Olympic champion. The offer, however, was not accepted, especially by the Italian Boxing Federation.

=== Post-Olympics Career ===
Carini expressed difficulty returning to boxing following the 2024 Olympics. Carini won a gold medal at the World Boxing Cup in Poland in December 2024.

== Personal life ==
The daughter of police officers, Carini also serves as an officer in the Polizia di Stato and is an athlete in their sporting division, Fiamme Oro.
