= Valentina Khalzova =

Kazakhstani boxer

Personal information
- Nationality: Kazakhstani
- Born: 16 January 1996 (age 30) Astana, Kazakhstan
- Height: 1.75 m (5 ft 9 in)

Boxing career
- Weight class: Welterweight, Light middleweight, Middleweight
Medal record
Women's amateur boxing
Representing Kazakhstan
World Championships
Gold medal – first place	2016 Astana	Welterweight
Bronze medal – third place	2022 Istanbul	Light middleweight
Bronze medal – third place	2023 New Delhi	Middleweight
Asian Championships
Gold medal – first place	2021 Dubai	Welterweight
Silver medal – second place	2017 Ho Chi Minh City	Welterweight

Valentina Khalzova (born 16 January 1996) is a Kazakhstani amateur boxer. She won a gold medal at the 2016 World Championships and bronze at the 2022 edition.

Khalzova competed for Kazakhstan at the 2024 Summer Olympics in the women's 75 kg event.
