= Shakhnoza Yunusova =

Uzbekistani boxer (born 1999)

Personal information
- Nationality: Uzbekistani
- Born: 2 January 1999 (age 26); Tashkent, Uzbekistan

Sport
- Sport: Boxing

Shakhnoza Yunusova (born 2 January 1999) is an Uzbekistani boxer. She competed in the women's welterweight event at the 2020 Summer Olympics.
