= Gu Hong =

Chinese boxer (born 1988)

Personal information
- Nationality: Chinese
- Born: 6 November 1988 (age 37) Dandong, China

Sport
- Sport: Boxing
Medal record
Women's amateur boxing
Representing China
Olympic Games
Silver medal – second place	2020 Tokyo	Welterweight
World Championships
Silver medal – second place	2018 New Delhi	Welterweight
Silver medal – second place	2016 Astana	Welterweight
Asian Championships
Gold medal – first place	2019 Bangkok	Welterweight
Gold medal – first place	2017 Ho Chi Minh City	Welterweight
Gold medal – first place	2015 Wulanchabu	Welterweight

Gu Hong (Chinese: 谷红; pinyin: Gǔ Hóng; born 6 November 1988) is a Chinese boxer and Olympic medalist. She is a two-time silver medalist at the AIBA Women's World Boxing Championships and a three-time gold medalist at the Asian Amateur Boxing Championships. She won a silver medal in the women's welterweight event at the 2020 Summer Olympics.
