= 2018 AIBA Women's World Boxing Championships =

Boxing competitions

- Location: New Delhi, India
- Start date: 15 November
- End date: 24 November
- Competitors: 277 from 62 nations

The 2018 AIBA Women's World Boxing Championships was held at KD Jadav Indoor Stadium at New Delhi, India and took place between 15 and 24 November 2018.

In the finals of the light flyweight category Mary Kom of India beat Ukrainian boxer Hana Okhota to win the gold, creating history by becoming the first woman boxer to win six gold medals in the IBA World Boxing Championships.

== Medal summary ==
=== Medal table ===
* Host nation (India)

Rank	Nation	Gold	Silver	Bronze	Total
1	China (CHN)	4	1	0	5
2	Chinese Taipei (TPE)	2	0	0	2
3	India (IND)*	1	1	2	4
4	North Korea (PRK)	1	0	2	3
5	Germany (GER)	1	0	1	2
6	Ireland (IRL)	1	0	0	1
7	Ukraine (UKR)	0	2	0	2
8	Turkey (TUR)	0	1	2	3
9	Kazakhstan (KAZ)	0	1	1	2
9	Netherlands (NED)	0	1	1	2
11	Bulgaria (BUL)	0	1	0	1
11	Colombia (COL)	0	1	0	1
11	Thailand (THA)	0	1	0	1
14	United States (USA)	0	0	3	3
15	Japan (JPN)	0	0	2	2
16	Australia (AUS)	0	0	1	1
16	Belarus (BLR)	0	0	1	1
16	Mongolia (MGL)	0	0	1	1
16	Russia (RUS)	0	0	1	1
16	South Korea (KOR)	0	0	1	1
16	Wales (WAL)	0	0	1	1
Totals (21 entries)		10	10	20	40

=== Medalists ===
Event	Gold	Silver	Bronze
Light flyweight (45–48 kg)	Mary Kom (IND)	Hanna Okhota (UKR)	Kim Hyang-mi (PRK)
Light flyweight (45–48 kg)	Mary Kom (IND)	Hanna Okhota (UKR)	Madoka Wada (JPN)
Flyweight (51 kg)	Pang Chol-mi (PRK)	Zhaina Shekerbekova (KAZ)	Virginia Fuchs (USA)
Flyweight (51 kg)	Pang Chol-mi (PRK)	Zhaina Shekerbekova (KAZ)	Tsukimi Namiki (JPN)
Bantamweight (54 kg)	Lin Yu-ting (TPE)	Stoyka Petrova (BUL)	Kristy Harris (AUS)
Bantamweight (54 kg)	Lin Yu-ting (TPE)	Stoyka Petrova (BUL)	Myagmardulamyn Nandintsetseg (MGL)
Featherweight (57 kg)	Ornella Wahner (GER)	Sonia Chahal (IND)	Jemyma Betrian (NED)
Featherweight (57 kg)	Ornella Wahner (GER)	Sonia Chahal (IND)	Jo Son-hwa (PRK)
Lightweight (60 kg)	Kellie Harrington (IRL)	Sudaporn Seesondee (THA)	Karina Ibragimova (KAZ)
Lightweight (60 kg)	Kellie Harrington (IRL)	Sudaporn Seesondee (THA)	Oh Yeon-ji (KOR)
Light welterweight (64 kg)	Dou Dan (CHN)	Mariia Bova (UKR)	Simranjit Kaur (IND)
Light welterweight (64 kg)	Dou Dan (CHN)	Mariia Bova (UKR)	Sema Çalışkan (TUR)
Welterweight (69 kg)	Chen Nien-chin (TPE)	Gu Hong (CHN)	Lovlina Borgohain (IND)
Welterweight (69 kg)	Chen Nien-chin (TPE)	Gu Hong (CHN)	Nadine Apetz (GER)
Middleweight (75 kg)	Li Qian (CHN)	Nouchka Fontijn (NED)	Naomi Graham (USA)
Middleweight (75 kg)	Li Qian (CHN)	Nouchka Fontijn (NED)	Lauren Price (WAL)
Light heavyweight (81 kg)	Wang Lina (CHN)	Jessica Caicedo (COL)	Elif Güneri (TUR)
Light heavyweight (81 kg)	Wang Lina (CHN)	Jessica Caicedo (COL)	Viktoria Kebikava (BLR)
Heavyweight (+81 kg)	Yang Xiaoli (CHN)	Şennur Demir (TUR)	Danielle Perkins (USA)
Heavyweight (+81 kg)	Yang Xiaoli (CHN)	Şennur Demir (TUR)	Kristina Tkacheva (RUS)

== Controversy ==
Despite the Kosovo Boxing Federation being a full member of the AIBA, Indian authorities refused to grant visas to competitors from Kosovo, thus preventing them from participating in the event. Athletes from Kosovo were previously denied entry to India in 2017 for the Youth Women's World Championships.
