= Emilie Sonvico =

French boxer (born 1989)

Personal information
- Born: 16 April 1989 (age 37) Montmorency, Val-d'Oise, France
- Height: 5 ft 7 in (170 cm)
- Weight: Welterweight

Boxing career
- Stance: Orthodox

Boxing record
- Total fights: 9
- Wins: 9
- Win by KO: 2

Emilie Sonvico (born 16 April 1989) is a French professional boxer. She has held the IBA female welterweight title since May 2026, having previously been European and WBC Silver champion in the same weight division.

== Career ==
After an amateur career in which she represented France internationally including at the world championships and European Games, Sonvico turned professional in 2024.

In her sixth pro-fight, she won the vacant European female welterweight title by knocking out Jordan Barker-Porter in the 10th and final round of their bout at Arenes d'Uzès in Uzès on 26 July 2025.

Next, Sonvico faced the previously unbeaten Dee Allen at Gymnase Trintignant in Uzès for the vacant WBC Silver female welterweight title on 13 December 2025. She knocked her opponent out in the first round.

At the same venue on 30 May 2026, she defeated Mahjouba Oubtil by unanimous decision to claim the vacant IBA female welterweight title.

== Personal life ==
Away from the boxing ring, Sonvico is an investigator in the National Gendarmerie.

== Professional boxing record ==
9 fights	9 wins	0 losses
By knockout	2	0
By decision	7	0

No.	Result	Record	Opponent	Type	Round, time	Date	Location	Notes
9	Win	9–0	Mahjouba Oubtil	UD	10	30 May 2026	Gymnase Trintignant, Uzès, France	Won the vacant IBA female welterweight title
8	Win	8–0	Erica Juana Gabriela Alvarez	PTS	8	4 Apr 2026	Salle des Fetes la Cantarelle, Roquemaure, France	
7	Win	7–0	Dee Allen	KO	1 (10)	13 Dec 2025	Gymnase Trintignant, Uzès, France	Won the vacant WBC Silver female welterweight title
6	Win	6–0	Jordan Barker-Porter	KO	10 (10)	26 Jul 2025	Arenes d'Uzès, Uzès, France	Won the vacant European female welterweight title
5	Win	5–0	Elsa Hemat	UD	6	26 Apr 2025	Hall des sports de Clavieres, Alès, France	
4	Win	4–0	Rosa Maria Acosta Carrion	UD	8	15 Feb 2025	Stade Bonicel, Uzès, France	
3	Win	3–0	Elsa Hemat	UD	6	8 Feb 2025	Centre Congres les Esselieres, Villejuif, France	
2	Win	2–0	Francesca Taylor	UD	4	14 Dec 2024	Salle Pablo Neruda, Nimes, France	
1	Win	1–0	Ksenija Medic	UD	4	23 Nov 2024	Salle Pablo Neruda, Nîmes, France	
