= Li Qian (boxer) =

Chinese boxer (born 1990)

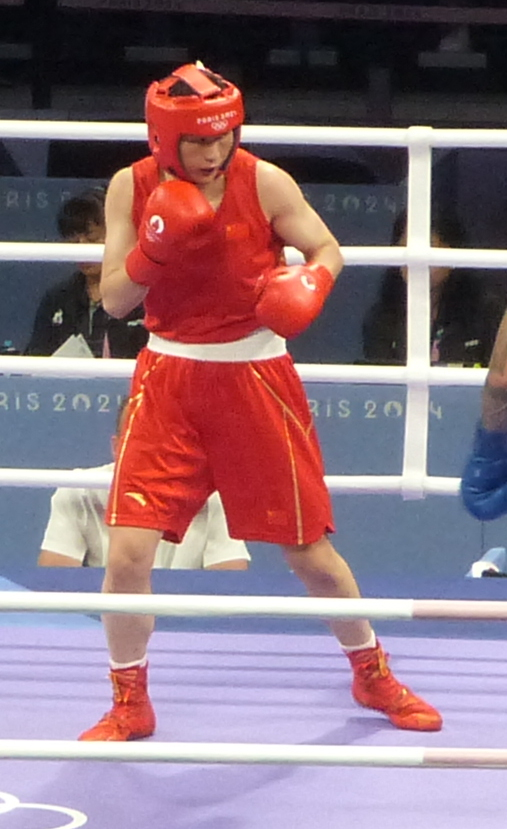
- Li at the 2024 Summer Olympics

Personal information
- Nationality: Chinese
- Born: 6 June 1990 (age 36) Shangqiu, Henan, China
- Height: 1.80 m (5 ft 11 in)

Boxing career
- Stance: Orthodox

Boxing record
- Total fights: 65
- Wins: 53
- Win by KO: 2
- Losses: 12
Medal record
Women's amateur boxing
Representing China
Olympic Games
| Gold medal – first place | 2024 Paris | Middleweight |
| Silver medal – second place | 2020 Tokyo | Middleweight |
| Bronze medal – third place | 2016 Rio de Janeiro | Middleweight |
World Championships
| Gold medal – first place | 2018 New Delhi | Middleweight |
| Silver medal – second place | 2014 Jeju City | Middleweight |
| Bronze medal – third place | 2023 New Delhi | Middleweight |
Asian Games
| Gold medal – first place | 2022 Hangzhou | Middleweight |
| Silver medal – second place | 2014 Incheon | Middleweight |
Asian Championships
| Gold medal – first place | 2017 Ho Chi Minh City | Middleweight |
| Gold medal – first place | 2019 Bangkok | Middleweight |
| Silver medal – second place | 2015 Wulanchabu | Middleweight |

Li Qian (Chinese: 李倩; pinyin: Lǐ Qiàn; born 6 June 1990) is a Chinese boxer. She won the bronze medal in the women's middleweight class at the 2016 Summer Olympics, a silver medal in the women's middleweight class at the delayed 2020 Summer Olympics and the gold medal in the same event at the 2024 Summer Olympics.

== Career ==
Li was born in China's Henan province. She and her parents moved to Ordos, Inner Mongolia, in 2001. While studying at the Inner Mongolia Vocational College of Physical Education, she played basketball. Her height and arm length drew the attention of Chinese boxing team coach Ha Dabater, who recommended her for the Inner Mongolian boxing team in 2007. She won the bronze medal in the women's middleweight class at the 2016 Summer Olympics in Rio de Janeiro. She then won a silver medal in the middleweight event at the postponed 2020 Summer Olympics, losing to Lauren Price in the final.

On 10 August 2024, she competed in the Paris 2024 Olympics and defeated Panamanian boxer Atheyna Bylon by 4–1 in the final to win the gold medal in Women's middleweight. She has thus become the 3rd Chinese female boxer to have become an Olympic champion.
