= Yaroslava Yakushina =

Russian boxer (born 1993)

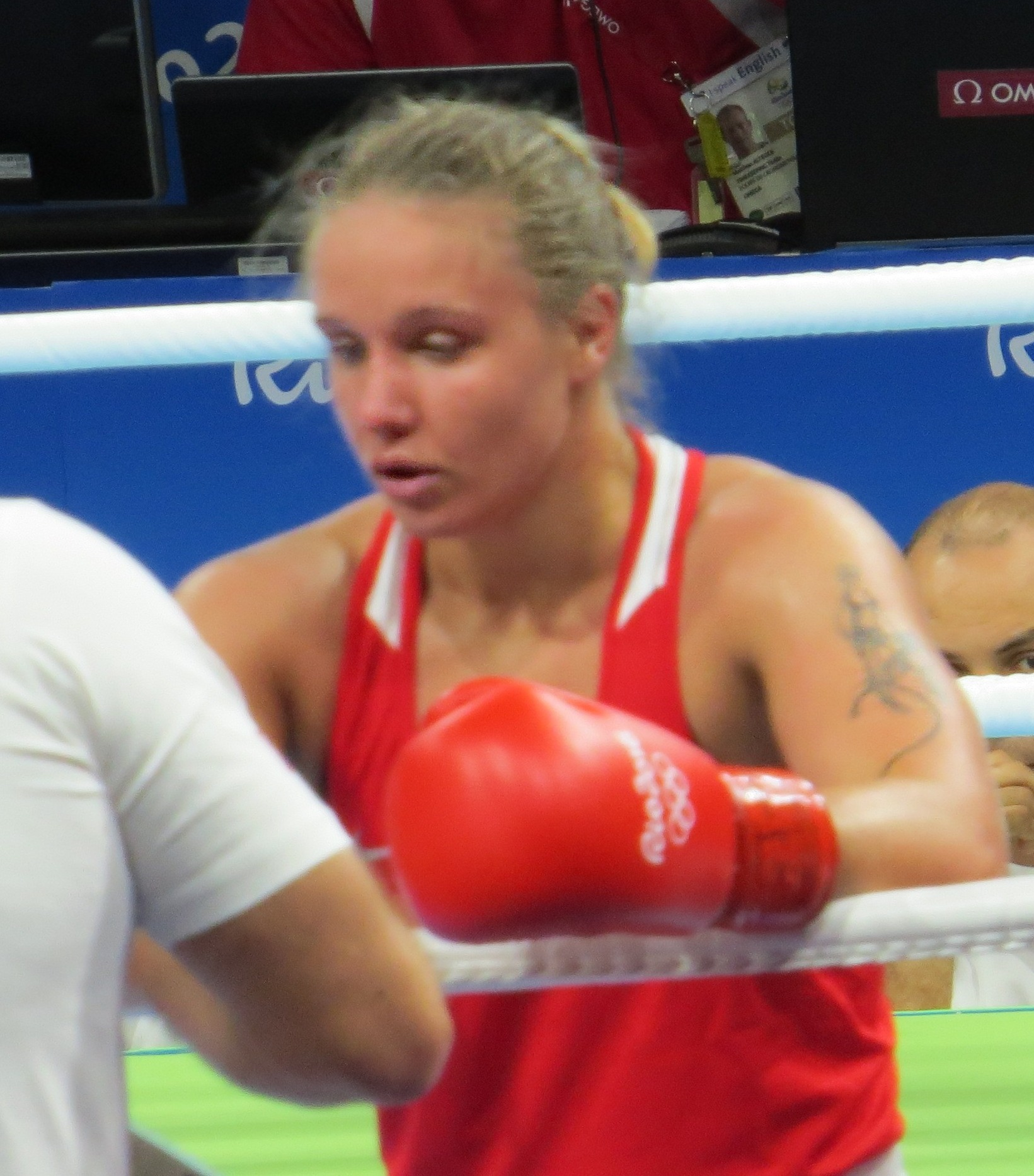
- Yakushina at the 2016 Olympics

Personal information
- Nationality: Russian
- Born: 24 June 1993 (age 33) Kokshetau, Kazakhstan
- Height: 170 cm (5 ft 7 in)

Sport
- Club: CSKA Moscow
- Coached by: Igor Koltygin; Viktor Lisitsyn

Yaroslava Ivanovna Yakushina (Russian: Ярослава Ивановна Якушина, born 24 June 1993) is a Russian boxer. She competed in the middleweight event at the 2016 Summer Olympics and was eliminated in her quarterfinals bout.

== Biography ==
Yakushina was born in 1993 in Kazakstan. In 1997, she moved with her parents to the Krasnodar Krai, settling in the stanitsa of Leningradskaya. At the age of 11, she began practicing kickboxing, switching to boxing in 2008. Her first coach was Sergey Nikolayevich Litvinenko.

In April 2011, Yakushina won the World Youth Championship.

== Amateur career ==
=== Early national and international success ===
At the 2012 Summer Olympics in London, women’s boxing was included in the Olympic program for the first time. Yakushina was a candidate for the Russian national team but lost the national qualifying spot to Nadezhda Torlopova.

Later that year, she became Russian national champion for the first time, defeating Svetlana Kosova in the final. She defended her national title in 2013. That same year, Yakushina won her first international medal — a bronze at the World Combat Games.

At the 2014 World Championships, she reached the quarterfinals but lost to Olympic champion Claressa Shields.

In 2015, she competed at the inaugural European Games in Baku, reaching the quarterfinals, where she lost 1:2 to a Polish opponent. Later that year, she once again won gold at the Russian Championships, earning the right to compete at the European Championships and Olympic qualifying tournaments.

=== Olympic qualification and Rio 2016 ===
In April 2016, Yakushina won the European Olympic qualifying tournament, becoming the first Russian female boxer to earn a personal quota place for the Summer Olympics in Rio de Janeiro.

=== Later career ===
Since 2017, Yakushina has represented Dagestan and competes for the Makhachkala Sports School of Olympic Reserve named after M.-S. Umakhanov.

In 2018, she moved up to the 69 kg weight category. At the Russian Championships in Ulan-Ude, she won gold, defeating Natalia Sychugova in the final.

At the 10th AIBA Women’s World Championships in India, she advanced to the quarterfinals. On 20 November 2018, she lost to Nadine Apetz of Germany, ending her run at the tournament. In earlier rounds, Yakushina had defeated Oshae Jones (USA)[7] and Karolina Koszewska (Poland).

== Career ==
- 2015 - Winning the Russian Championship
- 2015 - Victory at the International Boxing tournament in Spain
- 2016 - Victory at the 1/8 finals of the boxing tournament held as part of the 2016 Summer Olympics in Rio de Janeiro
- 2018 - Silver at the European Boxing Championships in Sofia (weight category up to 69 kilograms)
