= Busenaz Sürmeneli =

Turkish boxer (born 1998)

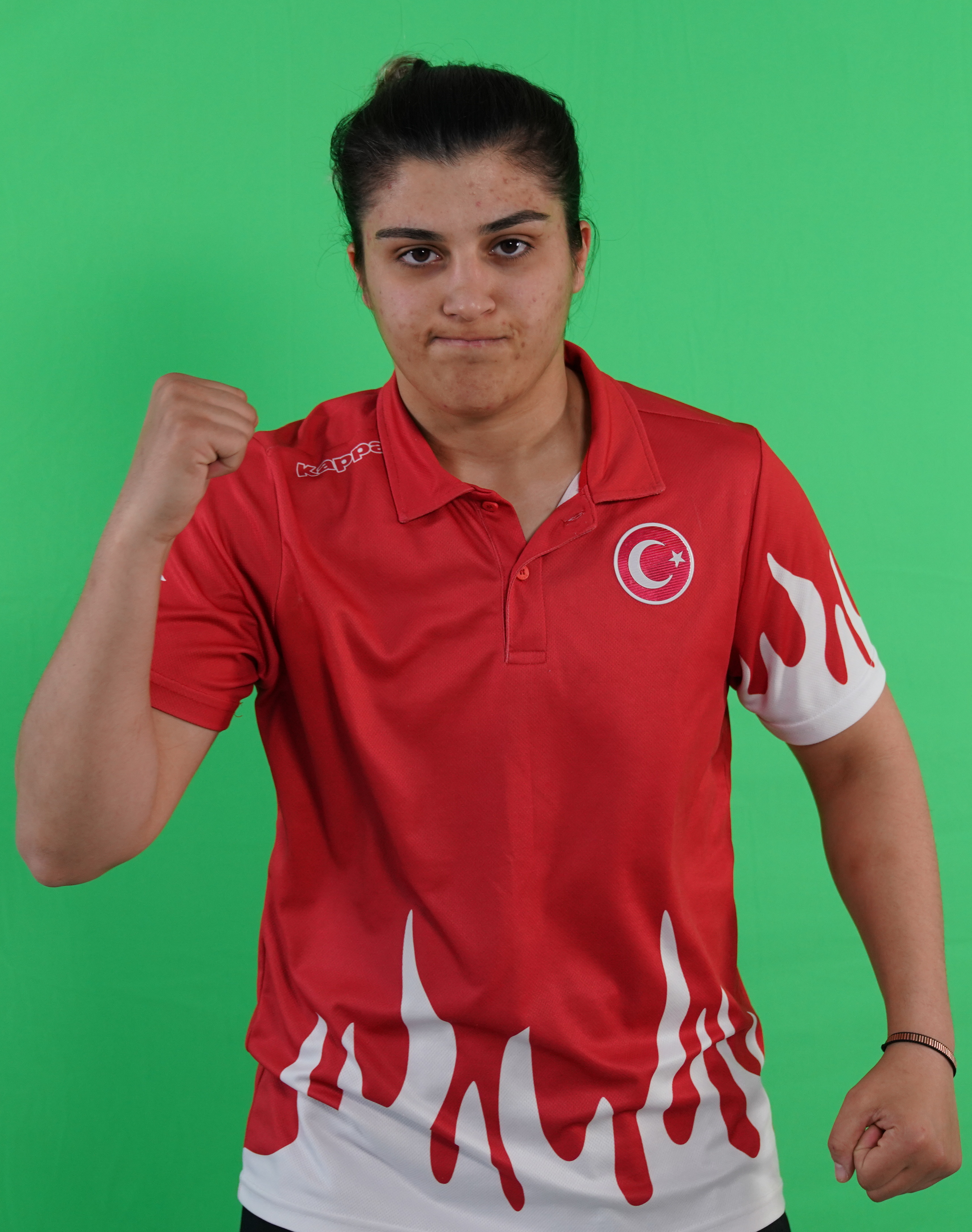
- Sürmeneli in 2020

Personal information
- Nationality: Turkish
- Born: 26 May 1998 (age 28) Bursa, Turkey
- Height: 1.72 m (5 ft 8 in)

Boxing career
- Weight class: Welterweight

Boxing record
- Total fights: 64
- Wins: 56
- Win by KO: 7
- Losses: 8
- Draws: 0
- No contests: 0
Medal record
Women's amateur boxing
Representing Turkey
Olympic Games
Gold medal – first place	2020 Tokyo	Welterweight
IBA World Championships
Gold medal – first place	2019 Ulan-Ude	Welterweight
Gold medal – first place	2022 Istanbul	Welterweight
Gold medal – first place	2025 Niš	Welterweight
European Games
Gold medal – first place	2023 Kraków	Welterweight
EUBC European Championships
Gold medal – first place	2024 Belgrade	Welterweight
Bronze medal – third place	2019 Alcobendas	Welterweight
Bronze medal – third place	2022 Budva	Welterweight
EB European Championships
Gold medal – first place	2026 Sofia	70 kg
European Union Championships
Silver medal – second place	2017 Cascia	Middleweight
Mediterranean Games
Gold medal – first place	2022 Oran	Welterweight

Busenaz Sürmeneli (born 26 May 1998) is a Turkish Olympic, World and European champion boxer.

== Personal life ==
Busenaz Sürmeneli was born in Bursa, Turkey, on 25 May 1998. She grew up in Trabzon, where her family had moved due to her father's profession. In her childhood, she wanted to play in the local women's football team. At the age of ten, she switched over to boxing with the guidance of Cahit Süme, technical director of the Turkey national boxing team. She studied Physical Education and Sport at Trabzon University. The 1.72 m (5 ft 7 1/2 in) female boxer at 65 kg (143 lb) is a member of Fenerbahçe Boxing.

== Boxing career ==
Sğrmeneli won several times titles at youth championships. In 2015, she enetered Trabzonspor Boxing.

She took the silver medal at the 2017 Women's European Union Amateur Boxing Championships in Cascia, Italy. She won the bronze medal at the 2019 Women's European Amateur Boxing Championships in Alcobendas, Spain. She became world champion at the 2019 AIBA Women's World Boxing Championships held in Ulan-Ude, Russia. In February 2020, she captured the gold medal in the 69 kg division at the 64th Bocskai István Memorial International Boxing Tournament held in Debrecen, Hungary.

Sürmeneli became champion in the welterweight event at the 2020 Summer Olympics. By defeating China’s Gu Hong, Surmeneli sealed the first-ever Olympics medal in boxing for Turkey at Kokugikan Arena in the Japanese capital. She has displayed exceptional form throughout the tournament, winning all her bouts with a one-sided 5:0 result.

Sürmeneli won the gold medal in the 2022 IBA Women's World Boxing Championships in Istanbul. Surmeneli beat her Canadian opponent Charlie Cavanagh in the final of welter weight, to become world champion for a second time.

She won the gold medal in the women's welterweight at the 3rd European Games held at Nowy Targ Arena in Nowy Targ, Poland, defeating Lithuanian Austėja Aučiūtė 5–0 in the first round, Greek Paraskevi Mavrommati in the second round on a referee's decision, Polish Aneta Rygielska 5–0 in the quarterfinals, Rosie Eccles of the United Kingdom 4–1 in the semifinals and Belgian Oshin Derieuw 5–0 in the final. Earned a quota for the 2024 Summer Olympics.

She won the gold medal by defeating Russian boxer Albina Moldazhanova 5–0 in the final match of the 2024 European Amateur Boxing Championships in Belgrade, Serbia. She became the world champion for the third time by defeating her Uzbek opponent, Navbakhor Khamidova, 5-0 in the 66 kg final competition of the 2025 World Women's Boxing Championship held in Niš, Serbia.

She reached the final of the 2025 IBA Women's World Boxing Championships 66 kg held in Niš, Serbia, after bye in the first round, defeating Slovak Tamara Kubalová in the quarterfinals and Serbian Anastasija Lukajić in the semifinals with 5-0 scores. In the final match, she defeated her Uzbek opponent Navbakhor Khamidova 5-0 and became the world champion for the third times.

== See also ==
- Buse Naz Çakıroğlu
