= Chen Nien-chin =

Taiwanese boxer (born 1997)

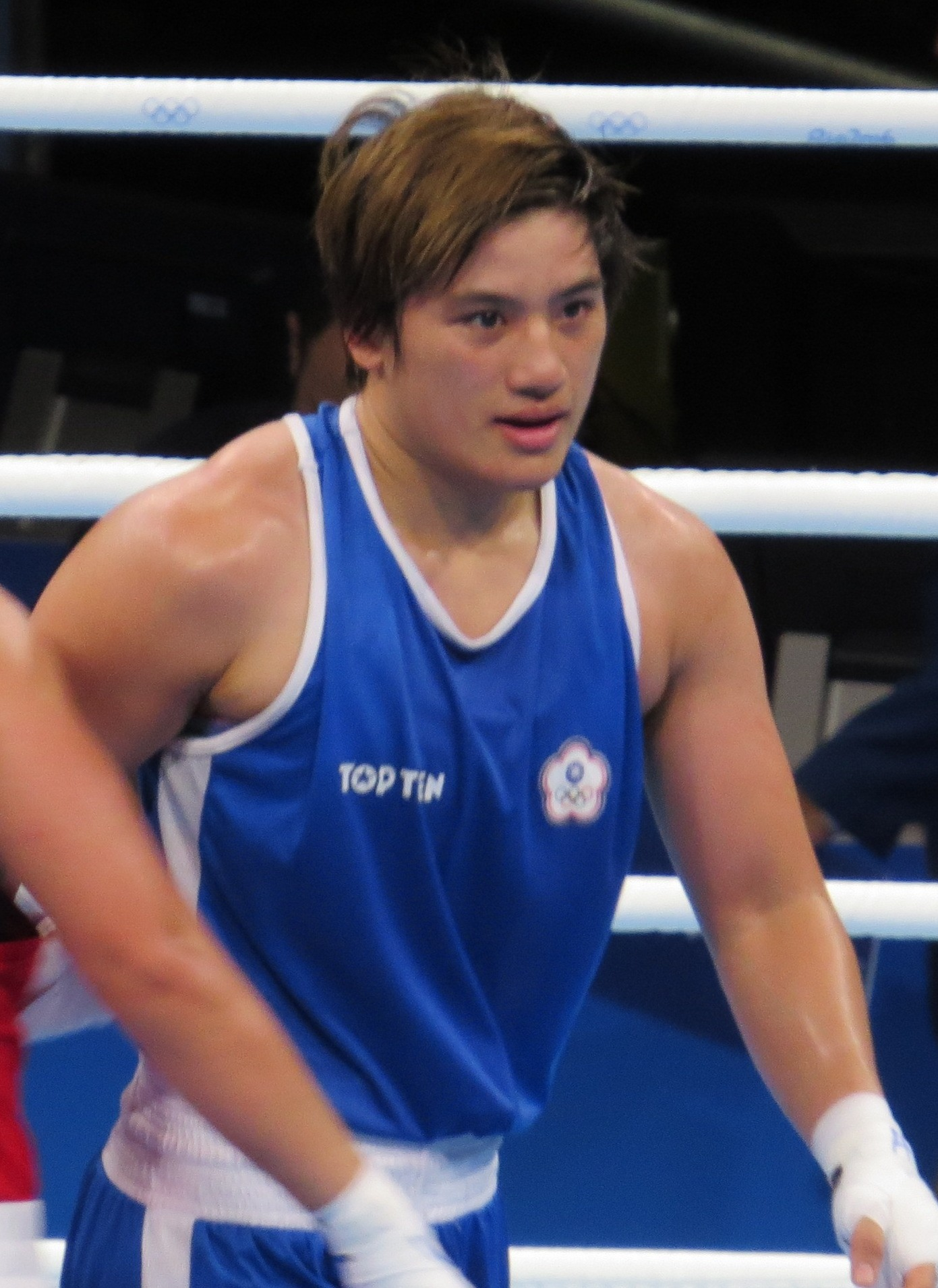
- Chen at the 2016 Olympics

Personal information
- Nationality: Taiwanese
- Born: 10 May 1997 (age 29) Hualien County, Taiwan
- Height: 169 cm (5 ft 7 in)

Sport
- Sport: Boxing
- Club: Hsinchu
- Coached by: Carlos Fuentes Villanueva; Zhang Chuanliang
Medal record
Women's amateur boxing
Representing Chinese Taipei
Olympic Games
Bronze medal – third place	2024 Paris	Welterweight
World Championships
Bronze medal – third place	2025 Liverpool	65 kg
AIBA World Championships
Gold medal – first place	2018 New Delhi	Welterweight
Bronze medal – third place	2016 Astana	Middleweight
Youth Olympics
Silver medal – second place	2014 Nanjing	Middleweight
Asian Games
Silver medal – second place	2026 Aichi–Nagoya	Welterweight
Bronze medal – third place	2022 Hangzhou	Welterweight
Asian Championships
Gold medal – first place	2022 Amman	Light middleweight
Silver medal – second place	2019 Bangkok	Welterweight
Bronze medal – third place	2017 Ho Chi Minh City	Middleweight

Chen Nien-chin (Chinese: 陳念琴; pinyin: Chén Niànqín; born 10 May 1997) is a Taiwanese middleweight boxer. In 2016, she won a bronze medal at the world championships, but was eliminated in her first bout at the Rio Olympics. She is a native of Hualien County. Chen is of Austronesian Taiwanese descent, with one parent being Amis and the other being Bunun. Chen was diagnosed with stage II Hodgkin lymphoma cancer in 2019, recovered in 2020 after intensive chemotherapy. After recovery, she competed in 2020 and 2024 Olympics in Welterweight boxing.

== Boxing career ==
Chen represented her nation at the 2020 Tokyo Olympics in Welterweight category and reached the quarterfinals. On 30 July 2021, she lost to Lovlina Borgohain of India and failed to ensure a medal. She earned a gold medal at the 2022 Thailand Open International Boxing Tournament.
