= Elina Gustafsson =

Finnish boxer (born 1992)

Personal information
- Nationality: Finnish
- Born: 6 February 1992 (age 34) Pori, Finland
- Weight: Light welterweight, Welterweight

Boxing career
- Stance: Orthodox

Boxing record
- Total fights: 105
- Wins: 84
- Win by KO: 1
- Losses: 21
Medal record
Women's amateur boxing
Finnish national championships
Gold medal – first place	2013, 2015, 2016	Light welterweight, Welterweight
Representing Finland
Nordic Championships
Gold medal – first place	2015, 2016	Light welterweight, Welterweight
European Championships
Gold medal – first place	2018 Sofia	Welterweight
World Championships
Bronze medal – third place	2016 Astana	Welterweight

Elina Orvokki Gustafsson (born 6 February 1992) is a retired Finnish boxer. She won a bronze medal in the welterweight category at the 2016 AIBA Women's World Boxing Championships and a gold medal at the 2018 European Amateur Boxing Championships.

In November 2020, Gustafsson announced finishing her career due to health issues.

According to her Instagram she is gay and was dating a Finnish professional dancer and choreographer Ansku Bergström, with whom she was competing in the Finnish version of Dancing With The Stars. The two fell in love during the dance practices and published their relationship on 12 December 2021 but broke up after a little over three years.
