= 2019 AIBA Women's World Boxing Championships – Middleweight =

Middleweight at the 2019 AIBA Women's World Boxing Championships
- Venue: FSK Sports Complex
- Location: Ulan-Ude, Russia
- Dates: 5–13 October
- Competitors: 24 from 24 nations

Medalists
gold medal	Lauren Price	Wales
silver medal	Nouchka Fontijn	Netherlands
bronze medal	Khadija El-Mardi	Morocco
bronze medal	Tammara Thibeault	Canada

The Middleweight competition at the 2019 AIBA Women's World Boxing Championships was held between 5 and 13 October 2019.

== Schedule ==
The schedule was as follows:

Date	Time	Round
Saturday 5 October 2019	20:00	Round of 32
Tuesday 8 October 2019	14:00; 19:00	Round of 16
Thursday 10 October 2019	14:30	Quarterfinals
Saturday 12 October 2019	14:30	Semifinals
Sunday 13 October 2019	After 16:00	Final

All times are Irkutsk Time (UTC+8)

== Results ==
=== Finals ===
Semifinals
(Netherlands) Nouchka Fontijn	4
(Canada) Tammara Thibeault	1
(Morocco) Khadija El-Mardi	0
(Wales) Lauren Price	5

Final
(Netherlands) Nouchka Fontijn	2
(Wales) Lauren Price	3*

- The original result, a 3–2 win for Fontijn was overturned on appeal to the Bout Review Jury; Lauren Price was crowned World Champion.

=== Top half ===
==== Section 1 ====
Round of 32
(Kazakhstan) Akerke Bakhytzhan	5
(Chinese Taipei) Lin Lee Hwei-hsien	0
(China) Zheng Lu	RSC
(Uzbekistan) Mavluda Movlonova

Round of 16
(Netherlands) Nouchka Fontijn	5
(Kazakhstan) Akerke Bakhytzhan	0
(China) Zheng Lu	5
(Ecuador) Érika Pachito	0

Quarterfinals
(Netherlands) Nouchka Fontijn	5
(China) Zheng Lu	0

==== Section 2 ====
Round of 32
(Albania) Elsidita Selaj
(Germany) Sarah Scheurich	RSC
(Sweden) Love Holgersson	0
(Panama) Atheyna Bylon	5

Round of 16
(Canada) Tammara Thibeault	5
(Germany) Sarah Scheurich	0
(Panama) Atheyna Bylon	2
(United States) Naomi Graham	3

Quarterfinals
(Canada) Tammara Thibeault	3
(United States) Naomi Graham	1

=== Bottom half ===
==== Section 3 ====
Round of 32
(Morocco) Khadija El-Mardi	3
(Russia) Galina Golovchenko	2
(France) Davina Michel	0
(Australia) Caitlin Parker	5

Round of 16
(Belarus) Victoriya Kebikava	0
(Morocco) Khadija El-Mardi	5
(Australia) Caitlin Parker	1
(Turkey) Şennur Demir	4

Quarterfinals
(Morocco) Khadija El-Mardi	3
(Turkey) Şennur Demir	2

==== Section 4 ====
Round of 32
(Italy) Carlotta Paoletti	0
(Lithuania) Iveta Lešinskytė	5
(India) Saweety	5
(Mongolia) Mönkhbatyn Myagmarjargal	0

Round of 16
(Poland) Elżbieta Wójcik
(Lithuania) Iveta Lešinskytė	RSC-I
(India) Saweety	1
(Wales) Lauren Price	3

Quarterfinals
(Lithuania) Iveta Lešinskytė	0
(Wales) Lauren Price	5
