= Cindy Ngamba =

Cameroonian boxer (born 1998)

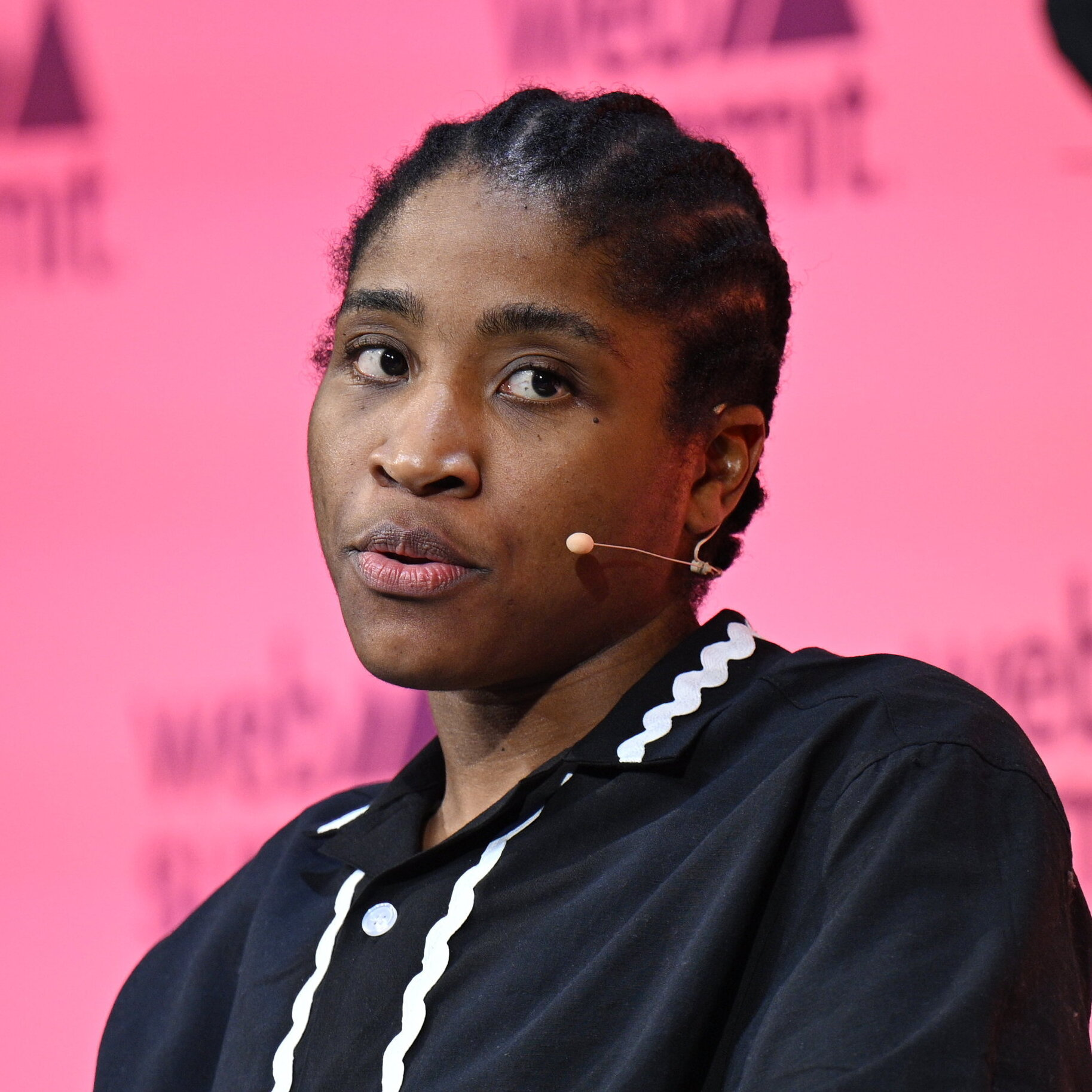
- Ngamba in 2024

Personal information
- National team: Refugee Olympic Team
- Born: 7 September 1998 (age 28) Douala, Cameroon
- Weight: Middleweight

Sport
- Sport: Boxing
- Club: Bolton
Medal record
Women's amateur boxing
Representing Refugee Olympic Team
Olympic Games
Bronze medal – third place	2024 Paris	Middleweight

Cindy Winner Djankeu Ngamba (born 7 September 1998) is a Cameroonian boxer based in the United Kingdom, who was the first-ever medalist for the Refugee Olympic Team, having won bronze in women's 75 kg boxing at the 2024 Summer Olympics. She also competed for the EOC Refugee Team at the 2023 European Games, before becoming a professional boxer in January 2025.

As of 2024, Ngamba is the only person from the Refugee Olympic Team to have ever won a medal.

== Early life and education ==
Ngamba was born in Cameroon and moved to the United Kingdom at the age of 11. Ngamba's uncle lost her immigration paperwork when he moved back to Cameroon, which, in 2019, caused Ngamba and her brother to be detained while attending an immigration office in Bolton. They were then sent to a detention centre in London, from which they were released on the following day.

In 2023, Ngamba graduated from the University of Bolton with a BA (Hons) degree in Crime and Criminal Justice.

== Career ==
=== Amateur career ===
Ngamba trained with GB Boxing, although she could not compete for Great Britain as she does not have a British passport. She has won British National Amateur Championships in three different weight categories, making her the first woman to achieve the feat since Natasha Jonas. In 2023, Ngamba won a Bocskai event in Hungary, and competed in the under 75kg event for the EOC Refugee Team at the 2023 European Games.

=== Olympics ===
She competed for the Refugee Olympic Team in the 2024 World Boxing Olympic Qualification Tournament 1 and qualified for the Summer Olympics in Paris, alongside her British colleague Chantelle Reid. On 2 May 2024, Ngamba was officially named in the Refugee Olympic Team, making her the first boxer to be selected for the team. She was also chosen as one of the Refugee Olympic Team flag-bearers for the opening ceremony alongside Syrian Taekwondo athlete Yahya Al-Ghotany.

Ngamba was drawn to fight 2022 IBA Women's World Boxing Championships gold medalist Tammara Thibeault from Canada in the first round and won by 3:2 split decision. She defeated 2022 World Championship bronze medalist Davina Michel of France via unanimous decision in the quarter-finals of the 2024 Paris Olympics to guarantee herself at least a bronze medal and in the process becoming the first person to win an Olympic medal for the Refugee Olympic Team. She fought Atheyna Bylon from Panama in the semi-finals and lost by 4:1 split decision, therefore taking a bronze medal.

=== Professional career ===
Ngamba turned professional and signed a multi-fight contract with promotors Boxxer in January 2025. She was scheduled to make her pro-debut against Kirstie Bavington at the Royal Albert Hall in London on 7 March 2025. However, Ngamba withdrew from the bout the day before it was set to take place due to an issue discovered during her pre-fight medical.

In February 2026, she was one of the six people who carried the Olympic flag at the opening ceremony of the 2026 Winter Olympics.

== Personal life ==
Ngamba is a lesbian and was granted refugee status in the United Kingdom because of her sexuality. She has applied for UK citizenship but her application has been rejected.

== Advocacy ==
In 2026, under the invitation of Boxing is Love, a UK-based Charity, she was featured in the campaign, "Everyone Deserves to Belong" to mark the International Day of Sports for Development and Peace, where she shared her story to call on the wider public to recognise the sport as a force for inclusion and social belonging.

== See also ==
- Zakia Khudadadi, Afghan athlete, first medalist for the Refugee Paralympic Team at 2024 Summer Paralympics
