= Boxing at the 2024 Summer Olympics – Women's 75 kg =

Women's 75 kg at the Games of the XXXIII Olympiad
- Boxing pictogram
- Venue: Arena Paris Nord (preliminary); Stade Roland Garros (semifinals and finals)
- Dates: 31 July – 10 August 2024
- Competitors: 16 from 16 nations

Medalists
| 1st place, gold medalist(s) | | Li Qian | China |
| 2nd place, silver medalist(s) | | Atheyna Bylon | Panama |
| 3rd place, bronze medalist(s) | | Caitlin Parker | Australia |
| 3rd place, bronze medalist(s) | | Cindy Ngamba | Refugee Olympic Team |

The women's 75 kg (middleweight) boxing event at the 2024 Summer Olympics took place between 31 July and 10 August 2024. Preliminary boxing matches occurred at Arena Paris Nord in Villepinte, with the medal rounds (semifinals and finals) staged at Stade Roland Garros.

== Qualification ==
Each NOC could send one boxer to the event.

== Competition format ==
Like all Olympic boxing events, the competition was a straight single-elimination tournament. The competition began with a preliminary round, where the number of competitors was reduced to 16, and concluded with a final. As there were fewer than 32 boxers in the competition, a number of boxers received a bye through the preliminary round. Both semi-final losers were awarded bronze medals.

Bouts consisted of three three-minute rounds with a one-minute break between rounds. A boxer may win by knockout or by points. Scoring was on the "10-point-must," with five judges scoring each round. Judges consider "number of blows landed on the target areas, domination of the bout, technique and tactical superiority and competitiveness." Each judge determined a winner for each round, who received 10 points for the round, and assigned the round's loser a number of points between seven and nine based on performance. The judge's scores for each round were added to give a total score for that judge. The boxer with the higher score from a majority of the judges was the winner.

== Schedule ==
The schedule was as follows.

Legend

| R32 | Round of 32 | R16 | Round of 16 | QF | Quarter-Finals | SF | Semi-Finals | F | Final |

| Jul 31 | Aug 1 | Aug 2 | Aug 3 | Aug 4 | Aug 5 | Aug 6 | Aug 7 | Aug 8 | Aug 9 | Aug 10 |
|---|---|---|---|---|---|---|---|---|---|---|
| R16 | | | | QF | | | | SF | | F |

== Draw ==
The draw was held on 25 July 2024.

== Seeds ==
The seeds were released on 25 July 2024.

1. Li Qian (CHN) (champion)
2. Aoife O'Rourke (IRL) (round of 16)
3. Tammara Thibeault (CAN) (round of 16)
4. Khadija El-Mardi (MAR) (quarterfinals)
5. Caitlin Parker (AUS) (semifinals)
6. Davina Michel (FRA) (quarterfinals)
7. Atheyna Bylon (PAN) (final)
8. Lovlina Borgohain (IND) (quarterfinals)

== Results ==
Round of 16
Li Qian (CHN) | 5
Hergie Bacyadan (PHI) | 0
Sunniva Hofstad (NOR) | 0
Lovlina Borgohain (IND) | 5
Caitlin Parker (AUS) | 5
Citlalli Ortiz (MEX) | 0
Chantelle Reid (GBR) | 2
Khadija El-Mardi (MAR) | 3
Tammara Thibeault (CAN) | 2
Cindy Ngamba (EOR) | 3
Baison Manikon (THA) | 0
Davina Michel (FRA) | 5
Atheyna Bylon (PAN) | 4
Valentina Khalzova (KAZ) | 1
Elżbieta Wójcik (POL) | 3
Aoife O'Rourke (IRL) | 2

Quarterfinals
Li Qian (CHN) | 4
Lovlina Borgohain (IND) | 1
Caitlin Parker (AUS) | 4
Khadija El-Mardi (MAR) | 1
Cindy Ngamba (EOR) | 5
Davina Michel (FRA) | 0
Atheyna Bylon (PAN) | 3
Elżbieta Wójcik (POL) | 2

Semifinals
Li Qian (CHN) | 5
Caitlin Parker (AUS) | 0
Cindy Ngamba (EOR) | 1
Atheyna Bylon (PAN) | 4

Final
Li Qian (CHN) | 4
Atheyna Bylon (PAN) | 1
