= Boxing at the 2020 Summer Olympics – Women's middleweight =

Olympic boxing event

Women's middleweight at the Games of the XXXII Olympiad
- Boxing pictogram
- Venue: Ryōgoku Kokugikan
- Dates: 28 July – 8 August 2021
- Competitors: 16 from 16 nations

Medalists
1st place, gold medalist(s)		Lauren Price	Great Britain
2nd place, silver medalist(s)		Li Qian	China
3rd place, bronze medalist(s)		Nouchka Fontijn	Netherlands
3rd place, bronze medalist(s)		Zemfira Magomedalieva	ROC

The women's middleweight boxing event at the 2020 Summer Olympics took place between 28 July and 8 August 2021 at the Ryōgoku Kokugikan. 17 boxers from 17 nations competed, Khadija El-Mardi from Morocco having withdrawn before the competition began.

The medals for the competition were presented by Battushig Batbold, Mongolia; IOC Member, and the medalists' bouquets were presented by Morinari Watanabe, Japan; BTF Chair.

== Background ==
This was the third appearance of the women's middleweight event; the event has been held every Summer Games since the introduction of women's boxing in 2012. It has been at the 69–75 kg range each appearance.

Reigning World Champion Lauren Price of Great Britain won the event.

Light heavyweight World Champion Zemfira Magomedalieva of Russia also qualified at this weight (the middleweight is the heaviest Olympic women's class), and won a bronze medal. The 2012 and 2016 Olympic champion, Claressa Shields of the United States, turned professional and did not attempt to qualify.

== Qualification ==
A National Olympic Committee (NOC) could enter only 1 qualified boxer in the weight class. There were 17 quota places available for the women's middleweight, allocated as follows:

- 2 places at the 2020 African Boxing Olympic Qualification Tournament.
- 4 places at the 2020 Asia & Oceania Boxing Olympic Qualification Tournament.
- 4 places at the 2020 European Boxing Olympic Qualification Tournament.
- 3 places that were intended to be awarded at the 2021 Pan American Boxing Olympic Qualification Tournament, which was cancelled. These places were instead awarded through the world ranking list to the top boxers from the Americas who had been registered for the qualification tournament.
- 4 places that were intended to be awarded at a World Olympic Qualifying Tournament, which was cancelled. These places were instead awarded through the world ranking list, with one place for each continental zone (Africa, Asia & Oceania, Europe, Americas).

The host nation, Japan, was guaranteed a minimum of two places across the five women's boxing events; because Japan qualified boxers in the flyweight and featherweight through the Asia & Oceania tournament, no host places were used in any women's weight class. No Tripartite Commission invitation was used in this weight class.

== Competition format ==
Like all Olympic boxing events, the competition is a straight single-elimination tournament. The competition begins with a preliminary round, where the number of competitors is reduced to 16, and concludes with a final. As there are fewer than 32 boxers in the competition, a number of boxers will receive a bye through the preliminary round. Both semifinal losers are awarded bronze medals.

Bouts consist of three three-minute rounds with a one-minute break between rounds. A boxer may win by knockout or by points. Scoring is on the "10-point-must" system, with 5 judges scoring each round. Judges consider "number of blows landed on the target areas, domination of the bout, technique and tactical superiority and competitiveness." Each judge determines a winner for each round, who receives 10 points for the round, and assigns the round's loser a number of points between 7 and 9 based on performance. The judge's scores for each round are added to give a total score for that judge. The boxer with the higher score from a majority of the judges is the winner.

== Schedule ==
The middleweight starts with the round of 16 on 28 July. There are two rest days before the quarterfinals on 31 July, five more before the semifinals on 6 August, and one more before the final on 8 August.

Legend

R16	Round of 16	QF	Quarterfinals	SF	Semifinals	F	Final

Date	Jul 24		Jul 25		Jul 26		Jul 27		Jul 28		Jul 29		Jul 30		Jul 31		Aug 1		Aug 2		Aug 3		Aug 4		Aug 5		Aug 6		Aug 7		Aug 8	
Event	A	E	A	E	A	E	A	E	A	E	A	E	A	E	A	E	A	E	A	E	A	E	A	E	A	E	A	E	A	E	A	E
Women's middleweight									R16						QF												SF				F	

== Results ==
Round of 16
Lauren Price (GBR)	5
Mönkhbatyn Myagmarjargal (MGL)	0
Caitlin Parker (AUS)	0
Atheyna Bylon (PAN)	5
Tammara Thibeault (CAN)	4
Nadezhda Ryabets (KAZ)	1
Elżbieta Wójcik (POL)	1
Nouchka Fontijn (NED)	4
Naomi Graham (USA)	1
Zemfira Magomedalieva (ROC)	4
Rady Gramane (MOZ)	4
Érika Pachito (ECU)	1
Pooja Rani (IND)	5
Ichrak Chaib (ALG)	0
Aoife O'Rourke (IRL)	0
Li Qian (CHN)	5

Quarterfinals
Lauren Price (GBR)	5
Atheyna Bylon (PAN)	0
Tammara Thibeault (CAN)	0
Nouchka Fontijn (NED)	5
Zemfira Magomedalieva (ROC)	4
Rady Gramane (MOZ)	1
Pooja Rani (IND)	0
Li Qian (CHN)	5

Semifinals
Lauren Price (GBR)	3
Nouchka Fontijn (NED)	2
Zemfira Magomedalieva (ROC)	0
Li Qian (CHN)	5

Final
Lauren Price (GBR)	5
Li Qian (CHN)	0
