= 2018 AIBA Women's World Boxing Championships – Middleweight =

Boxing competitions

Middleweight at the 2018 AIBA Women's World Boxing Championships
- Dates: 17–24 November
- Competitors: 24 from 24 nations

Medalists
gold medal	Li Qian	China
silver medal	Nouchka Fontijn	Netherlands
bronze medal	Lauren Price	Wales
bronze medal	Naomi Graham	United States

The Middleweight (69-75 kg) competition at the 2018 AIBA Women's World Boxing Championships was held from 17 to 24 November 2018.

== Draw ==
Round of 32
17 Nov
(Mongolia) Mönkhbatyn Myagmarjargal	3
(Argentina) Yazmín Marzo	2
17 Nov
(Ukraine) Mariya Borutsa	0
(Canada) Tammara Thibeault	5
17 Nov
(Republic of Ireland) Aoife O'Rourke	5
(Chinese Taipei) Yang Ya-chu	0
17 Nov
(South Korea) Seon Su-jin	0
(Poland) Elżbieta Wójcik	5
17 Nov
(Mozambique) Rady Gramane	3
(Uzbekistan) Ezozakhon Melieva	2
17 Nov
(Turkey) Busenaz Sürmeneli	2
(Russia) Darima Sandakova	3
17 Nov
(Kazakhstan) Aiida Ongdash	0
(England) Natasha Gale	5
17 Nov
(Democratic Republic of the Congo) Jorbelle Malewu Tekasala	0
(Sweden) Love Holgersson	5

Round of 16
19 Nov
(Netherlands) Nouchka Fontijn	5
(Mongolia) Mönkhbatyn Myagmarjargal	0
19 Nov
(Canada) Tammara Thibeault	5
(New Zealand) Chei Kenneally	0
19 Nov
(Wales) Lauren Price	5
(Republic of Ireland) Aoife O'Rourke	0
19 Nov
(Poland) Elżbieta Wójcik	5
(India) Saweety Boora	0
19 Nov
(Germany) Sarah Scheurich	4
(Mozambique) Rady Gramane	1
19 Nov
(Russia) Darima Sandakova
(United States) Naomi Graham	RSC
19 Nov
(Italy) Canfora Assunta	0
(England) Natasha Gale	5
19 Nov
(Sweden) Love Holgersson	1
(China) Li Qian	4

Quarterfinals
20 Nov
(Netherlands) Nouchka Fontijn	5
(Canada) Tammara Thibeault	0
20 Nov
(Wales) Lauren Price	3
(Poland) Elżbieta Wójcik	2
20 Nov
(Germany) Sarah Scheurich	2
(United States) Naomi Graham	3
20 Nov
(England) Natasha Gale	2
(China) Li Qian	3

Semifinals
23 Nov
(Netherlands) Nouchka Fontijn	3
(Wales) Lauren Price	2
23 Nov
(United States) Naomi Graham	0
(China) Li Qian	5

Final
24 Nov
(Netherlands) Nouchka Fontijn	1
(China) Li Qian	4
