= 2014 AIBA Youth World Boxing Championships =

Boxing competitions

- Location: Sofia, Bulgaria
- Dates: 10–25 April

The 2014 AIBA Youth World Boxing Championships were held in Sofia, Bulgaria, from 10 to 25 April 2014. The competition is under the supervision of the world's governing body for amateur boxing AIBA and is the junior version of the World Amateur Boxing Championships. The competition was open to boxers born in 1996 and 1997. This was a qualifying tournament for the 2014 Summer Youth Olympics.

== Medal summary ==
=== Men ===
Event	Gold	Silver	Bronze
Light flyweight (−49 kg)	Shalkar Aikynbay; Kazakhstan	Sulaymon Latipov; Uzbekistan	Shyam Kumar Kakara; AIBA^{A} Rufat Huseynov; Azerbaijan
Flyweight (−52 kg)	Shakur Stevenson; United States	Muhammad Ali; England	Lyu Ping; China Masud Yusifzada; Azerbaijan
Bantamweight (−56 kg)	Javier Ibáñez; Cuba	Sultan Zaurbek; Kazakhstan	Dushko Blagovestov; Bulgaria Peter McGrail; England
Lightweight (−60 kg)	Ablaikhan Zhussupov; Kazakhstan	Arsen Mustafa; Romania	Ikboljon Kholdarov; Uzbekistan Go Hosaka; Japan
Light Welterweight (−64 kg)	Bibert Tumenov; Russia	Viktor Petrov; Ukraine	Vincenzo Arecchia; Italy Toshihiro Suzuki; Japan
Welterweight (−69 kg)	Bektemir Melikuziev; Uzbekistan	Luka Prtenjača; Croatia	Juan Ramón Solano; Dominican Republic Ilyas Odinayev; Belarus
Middleweight (−75 kg)	Dmitriy Nesterov; Russia	Luka Plantić; Croatia	Kozimbek Mardonov; Uzbekistan Ramil Gadzhyiev; Ukraine
Light Heavyweight (−81 kg)	Blagoy Naydenov; Bulgaria	Vadim Kazakov; Kazakhstan	Narek Manasyan; Armenia Vegar Tregren; Norway
Heavyweight (−91 kg)	Yordan Hernández; Cuba	Toni Filipi; Croatia	Robert Marton; Ukraine Kim Jin-nyong; South Korea
Super Heavyweight (+ 91 kg)	Darmani Rock; United States	Peter Kadiru; Germany	László Komor; Hungary Marat Kerimkhanov; Russia

=== Women ===
Event	Gold	Silver	Bronze
Flyweight (–51 kg)	Anush Grigoryan; Armenia	Irma Testa; Italy	Alua Balkibekova; Kazakhstan Neriman Istık; Turkey
Lightweight (–60 kg)	Jajaira Gonzalez; United States	Esra Yıldız; Turkey	Anhelina Bondarenko; Ukraine Monica Floridia; Italy
Middleweight (–75 kg)	Elżbieta Wójcik; Poland	Caitlin Parker; Australia	Chen Nien-chin; Chinese Taipei Martha Fabela; United States

== Medal table ==
* Host nation (Bulgaria)

Rank	Nation	Gold	Silver	Bronze	Total
1	United States	3	0	1	4
2	Kazakhstan	2	2	1	5
3	Russia	2	0	1	3
4	Cuba	2	0	0	2
5	Uzbekistan	1	1	2	4
6	Armenia	1	0	1	2
6	Bulgaria*	1	0	1	2
8	Poland	1	0	0	1
9	Croatia	0	3	0	3
10	Ukraine	0	1	3	4
11	Italy	0	1	2	3
12	England	0	1	1	2
12	Turkey	0	1	1	2
14	Australia	0	1	0	1
14	Germany	0	1	0	1
14	Romania	0	1	0	1
17	Azerbaijan	0	0	2	2
17	Japan	0	0	2	2
19	AIBA^{A}	0	0	1	1
19	Belarus	0	0	1	1
19	China	0	0	1	1
19	Chinese Taipei	0	0	1	1
19	Dominican Republic	0	0	1	1
19	Hungary	0	0	1	1
19	Norway	0	0	1	1
19	South Korea	0	0	1	1
Totals (26 entries)		13	13	26	52

== See also ==
- World Amateur Boxing Championships

== Notes ==
A AIBA terminated Indian Boxing Federation, but sportsmen could participate in international events under the AIBA flag.
