= Lauren Price =

Welsh boxer (born 1994)

Lauren Price MBE
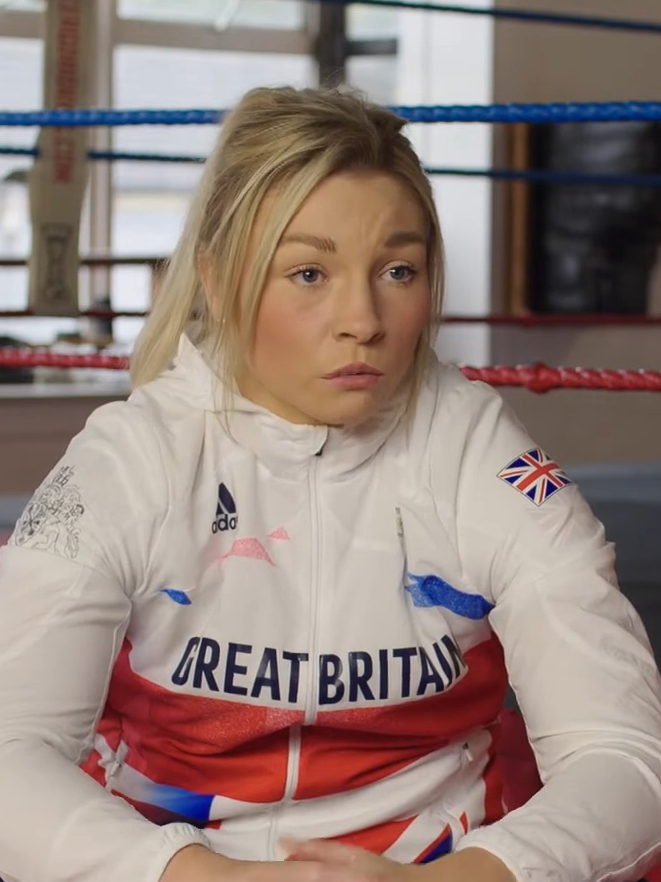
- Price in 2021
- Born: 25 June 1994 (age 32); Newport, Wales, United Kingdom
- Boxing career
- Height: 5 ft 5 1/2 in (166 cm)
- Weight: Welterweight
- Stance: Southpaw

Boxing record
- Total fights: 11
- Wins: 11
- Win by KO: 2
Medal record
Women's Boxing
Representing Great Britain
Olympic Games
Gold medal – first place	2020 Tokyo	Middleweight
European Games
Gold medal – first place	2019 Minsk	Middleweight
Representing Wales
World Championships
Gold medal – first place	2019 Ulan-Ude	Middleweight
Bronze medal – third place	2018 New Delhi	Middleweight
European Championships
Bronze medal – third place	2011 Rotterdam	Welterweight
Bronze medal – third place	2016 Sofia	Middleweight
Bronze medal – third place	2018 Sofia	Middleweight
Commonwealth Games
Gold medal – first place	2018 Gold Coast	Middleweight
Bronze medal – third place	2014 Glasgow	Middleweight
Association football career
Senior career*
Years	Team	Apps	(Gls)
2012–2014	Cardiff City F.C.		
International career
2011	Wales U17	3	(0)
2011–2013	Wales U19	12	(2)
2012–2013	Wales	2	(0)
- * Club domestic league appearances and goals

Lauren Louise Price (born 25 June 1994) is a Welsh professional boxer and former kickboxer and footballer. In November 2026, she became the first undisputed professional boxing champion from Wales, holding all the globally recognised female welterweight titles. She was the first-ever female British professional boxing champion having won the welterweight title in 2023 and holding it until vacating the belt when she became World champion. While representing Wales in the amateur sport she won a bronze medal at the 2014 Commonwealth Games, becoming the first Welsh woman to win a Commonwealth Games boxing medal. Four years later she surpassed this achievement by winning gold at the 2018 Commonwealth Games, followed by a gold at the 2019 World Championships. While representing Great Britain, she won gold medals at the 2019 European Games and 2020 Summer Olympics.

As an amateur, Price was simultaneously the holder of the Olympic Games, World, European Games and Commonwealth Games titles at Middleweight through 2019 and 2021, with the European championship (the EBA continental championship distinct from the European Games) being the only major prize eluding her, despite winning three bronze medals.

Price also played football for several years with Cardiff City, winning the inaugural season of the Welsh Premier Women's Football League in 2013. Having captained Wales at under-19 level, she made her senior debut in 2012. She gave up playing football in 2014 to focus on her boxing career.

== Early life ==
Price was born in Newport, but grew up in Bargoed, where she was brought up by her grandparents. She attended Heolddu Comprehensive School in Bargoed. She showed a keen interest in several sports, taking up football, netball, and kickboxing at the age of ten, the last after encouragement from her grandfather. As a kickboxer, Price won a silver medal at a World Championships event in Athens in 2007 at the age of 13, competing against opponents twice her age, and became the youngest ever competitor in the British Championships. She went on to become a four-time world champion and six-time European champion in the sport and later competed in Taekwondo.

== Football career ==
=== Club ===
Price was spotted by scouts from Cardiff City. She credited her kickboxing training with helping improve her play, commenting "I could kick a ball a lot further than any of my team mates" and noting that "I might have had a higher pain threshold than everyone else." She was part of the club's under-16 side that won the Welsh section of the Tesco Cup in 2010, being named player of the tournament.

She progressed to the senior team at Cardiff and won the inaugural Welsh Premier Women's Football League title during the 2012–13 season, after their decisive 5–2 victory over Wrexham in the final game of the season. Price was named the club's Player of the Year during their title winning season. Price was also named the Football Association of Wales (FAW) Club Player of the Year. In 2014, Price stepped away from football to concentrate on her boxing career ahead of the 2014 Commonwealth Games.

=== International ===
Having captained Wales at under-19 level, Price made her debut for the Wales senior side on 16 June 2012, replacing Sarah Wiltshire in the closing stages of a 1–0 victory over Republic of Ireland.

== Amateur boxing career ==
Price initially took up boxing as a teenager but became further involved in the sport after watching Nicola Adams win gold at the 2012 Summer Olympics in London. After competing in a single amateur bout at 17, she entered the Women's European and Youth World Championships where she claimed a bronze medal. At the 2014 Commonwealth Games, she became the first Welsh woman to claim a boxing medal in the Commonwealth Games after defeating Kaye Scott in the quarter-finals of the women's middleweight division to guarantee at least a bronze. She met Ariane Fortin in the semi-final but suffered a split decision defeat.

Price claimed another bronze medal at the 2016 Women's European Amateur Boxing Championships. In 2018, she won gold at the 2018 Commonwealth Games, after defeating Caitlin Parker via split decision in the final of the event. At the 2018 AIBA Women's World Boxing Championships in New Delhi, India, she guaranteed herself a bronze medal after beating Elzbieta Wojckik of Poland in her middleweight quarter-final. She lost 3-2 on the judges' scorecards in the semi-fina against Nouchka Fontijin of Holland.

In May 2019, Price was selected to compete at the 2019 European Games in Minsk, Belarus, winning the gold medal.

Price competed in the 2020 Summer Olympics in Tokyo, beating Dutch boxer Nouchka Fontijn in the middleweight semi-final. She went on to win gold against Li Qian of China, making her the first Welsh boxer of any gender to win an Olympic gold medal.

== Professional boxing career ==
On 6 May 2023 at Resorts World Arena in Birmingham, England, Price won the first British women's title fight in professional boxing history, becoming the first female British welterweight champion and the first woman to receive a Lonsdale Belt. She defeated Kirstie Bavington by unanimous decision.

=== WBA welterweight champion ===
==== Price vs. McCaskill ====
On 14 March 2024, it was announced that Price would challenge Jessica McCaskill for her WBA, IBO, and Ring female welterweight World titles on 11 May 2024 at Cardiff International Arena in Cardiff, Wales. Price won the contest by unanimous technical decision after an accidental clash of heads that took place in the fifth round caused an injury to McCaskill's eye and she was ruled unable to continue at the start of round nine. The win made Price Wales’ first female professional boxing world champion.

==== Price vs. Mateus ====
Price made the first defense of her WBA, IBO and Ring welterweight titles against Bexcy Mateus at the Exhibition Centre in Liverpool, England, on 14 December 2024. She won by stoppage in the third round.

=== Unified welterweight champion ===
==== Price vs. Jonas ====
Price defeated Natasha Jonas by unanimous decision at the Royal Albert Hall in London, England, on 7 March 2025 to retain her WBA welterweight title, and claim the WBC and IBF titles.

==== Price vs. Piñeiro ====
After more than a year away from the competitive boxing ring, Price made the first defence of her unified WBC, WBA and IBF female welterweight titles against the previously undefeated Stephanie Pineiro Aquino on 4 April 2026 at Cardiff International Arena in Cardiff, Wales. She won by unanimous decision.

=== Undisputed welterweight champion ===
==== Price vs. Kotaskova ====
Fighting at Cardiff International Arena for the second successive bout, Price became the first undisputed professional boxing champion from Wales when she successfully defended her titles, and won the vacant WBO championship, against Michaela Kotaskova via unanimous decision on 20 November 2026.

== Professional boxing record ==
11 fights	11 wins	0 losses
By knockout	2	0
By decision	9	0

No.	Result	Record	Opponent	Type	Round, time	Date	Location	Notes
11	Win	11–0	Michaela Kotaskova	UD	10	20 Nov 2026	Cardiff International Arena, Cardiff, Wales	Retained WBC, WBA, IBF, IBO and The Ring female welterweight titles; Won vacant WBO female welterweight title
10	Win	10–0	Stephanie Pineiro Aquino	UD	10	4 Apr 2026	Cardiff International Arena, Cardiff, Wales	Retained WBC, WBA, IBF, IBO and The Ring female welterweight titles
9	Win	9–0	Natasha Jonas	UD	10	7 Mar 2025	Royal Albert Hall, London, England	Retained WBA, IBO, and The Ring female welterweight titles; Won WBC and IBF female welterweight titles
8	Win	8–0	Bexcy Mateus	TKO	3 (10) 1:42	14 Dec 2024	Exhibition Centre, Liverpool, England	Retained WBA, IBO and The Ring female welterweight titles
7	Win	7–0	Jessica McCaskill	TD	9 (10), 0:02	11 May 2024	Cardiff International Arena, Cardiff, Wales	Won WBA, IBO, and The Ring female welterweight titles
6	Win	6–0	Silvia Bortot	PTS	8	10 Dec 2023	Bournemouth International Centre, Bournemouth, England	
5	Win	5–0	Lolita Muzeya	TD	6 (8), 0:24	2 Sep 2023	Manchester Arena, Manchester, England	Muzeya cut by a head clash in the 5th
4	Win	4–0	Kirstie Bavington	UD	10	6 May 2023	Resorts World Arena, Birmingham, England	Won inaugural British female welterweight title
3	Win	3–0	Naomi Mannes	UD	8	11 Mar 2023	Zénith Paris, Paris, France	
2	Win	2–0	Timea Belik	TKO	4 (6), 1:18	15 Oct 2022	The O2 Arena, London, England	
1	Win	1–0	Valgerdur Gudstensdottir	PTS	6	11 Jun 2022	The SSE Arena Wembley, London, England	

== Personal life ==
Price studied a Foundation Degree in Football Coaching and Development at the University of South Wales. Price was appointed Member of the Order of the British Empire (MBE) in the 2022 New Year Honours for services to boxing.

Her partner was featherweight boxer and fellow southpaw Karriss Artingstall for some time, but in April 2025, Price announced her engagement to Carlie Jones. The couple married on 30 May 2026.

== Honours ==
Cardiff City

- Welsh Premier Women's Football League; 2012–13

Individual

- FAW Club Player of the Year: 2013
- BBC Cymru Wales Sports Personality of the Year: 2021

== See also ==
- List of female boxers
- List of southpaw stance boxers

Sporting positions
Regional boxing titles
New title	British welterweight champion 6 May 2023 – 11 May 2024; Won world title	Vacant
Minor world boxing titles
Preceded by Jessica McCaskill	IBO welterweight champion 11 May 2024 – present	Incumbent
Major world boxing titles
Preceded by Jessica McCaskill	WBA welterweight champion 11 May 2024 – present	Incumbent
Preceded by Jessica McCaskill	The Ring welterweight champion 11 May 2024 – present	Incumbent
Preceded by Natasha Jonas	WBC welterweight champion 7 March 2025 – present	Incumbent
Preceded by Natasha Jonas	IBF welterweight champion 7 March 2025 – present	Incumbent
