= 2014 AIBA Women's World Boxing Championships – Heavyweight =

Boxing competitions

The Heavyweight (+81 kg) competition at the 2014 AIBA Women's World Boxing Championships was held from 19 to 24 November 2014.

== Medalists ==
Gold	Zenfira Magomedalieva (RUS)
Silver	Lazzat Kungeibayeva (KAZ)
Bronze	Wang Shijin (CHN)
Bronze	Emine Bozduman (TUR)

== Draw ==
First Round
(Russia) Zenfira Magomedalieva	TKO
(Azerbaijan) Aynur Rzayeva
(Senegal) Mbengue Astou
(China) Wang Shijin	TKO
(Hungary) Mária Kovács	0
(Turkey) Emine Bozduman	2
(Romania) Elena Turcin	0
(Kazakhstan) Lazzat Kungeibayeva	3

Quarterfinals
(India) Kavita Chahal	0
(Russia) Zenfira Magomedalieva	3
(China) Wang Shijin	3
(Italy) Flavia Severin	0
(United States) Krystal Dixon	0
(Turkey) Emine Bozduman	3
(Kazakhstan) Lazzat Kungeibayeva	3
(Croatia) Danijela Vernić	0

Semifinals
(Russia) Zenfira Magomedalieva	2
(China) Wang Shijin	1
(Turkey) Emine Bozduman	1
(Kazakhstan) Lazzat Kungeibayeva	2

Final
(Russia) Zenfira Magomedalieva	3
(Kazakhstan) Lazzat Kungeibayeva	0
