= Boxing at the 2018 Commonwealth Games – Women's middleweight =

Boxing competitions

Boxing – Women's middleweight at the 2018 Commonwealth Games
- Venue: Oxenford Studios
- Dates: 6 – 14 April 2018
- Competitors: 9 from 9 nations

Medalists
gold medal	Lauren Price	Wales
silver medal	Caitlin Parker	Australia
bronze medal	Millicent Agboegbulem	Nigeria
bronze medal	Tammara Thibeault	Canada

The women's middleweight boxing competitions at the 2018 Commonwealth Games in Gold Coast, Australia took place between 6 and 14 April at Oxenford Studios. Women middleweights were limited to those boxers weighing less than 75 kilograms.

Like all Commonwealth boxing events, the competition was a straight single-elimination tournament. Both semifinal losers were awarded bronze medals, so no boxers competed again after their first loss. Bouts consisted of three rounds of three minutes each, with one-minute breaks between rounds. Beginning this year, the competition was scored using the "must-ten" scoring system.

== Schedule ==
The schedule is as follows:

All times are Australian Eastern Standard Time (UTC+10)

Date	Time	Round
Friday 6 April 2018	20:17	Round of 16
Monday 9 April 2018	14:32/20:47	Quarter-finals
Friday 13 April 2018	21:32	Semi-finals
Saturday 14 April 2018	20:17	Final

== Results ==
The draw is as follows:

Round of 16
Millicent Agboegbulem (NGR)	5
Salote Huni (TGA)	0

Quarterfinals
Elizabeth Andiego (KEN)	0
Millicent Agboegbulem (NGR)	5
Caitlin Parker (AUS)	5
Natasha Gale (ENG)	0
Clotilde Essiane (CMR)	2
Tammara Thibeault (CAN)	3
Lauren Price (WAL)	5
Rady Gramane (MOZ)	0

Semifinals
Millicent Agboegbulem (NGR)	0
Caitlin Parker (AUS)	5
Tammara Thibeault (CAN)	0
Lauren Price (WAL)	5

Final
Caitlin Parker (AUS)	1
Lauren Price (WAL)	4
