= Boxing at the 2023 European Games – Women's middleweight =

Women's middleweight boxing at the 2023 European Games
- Venue: Nowy Targ Arena
- Location: Nowy Targ, Poland
- Dates: 25 June – 2 July
- Competitors: 19 from 19 nations

Medalists
gold medal	Aoife O'Rourke	Ireland
silver medal	Davina Michel	France
bronze medal	Elżbieta Wójcik	Poland
bronze medal	Irina Schönberger	Germany

The women's middleweight boxing event at the 2023 European Games was held between 25 June and 2 July 2023.

== Results ==
=== Finals ===
Semi-finals
Davina Michel (FRA)	5
Irina Schönberger (GER)	0
Elżbieta Wójcik (POL)	2
Aoife O'Rourke (IRL)	3

Final
Davina Michel (FRA)	0
Aoife O'Rourke (IRL)	5

=== Top half ===
==== Section 1 ====
Round of 32
Davina Michel (FRA)	3
Kerry Davis (GBR)	2

Round of 16
Tímea Nagy (HUN)	0
Davina Michel (FRA)	5
Melissa Gemini (ITA)	4
Jessica Triebeľová (SVK)	1

Quarterfinals
Davina Michel (FRA)	4
Melissa Gemini (ITA)	0

==== Section 2 ====
Round of 32

Round of 16
Vasiliki Stavridou (GRE)	0
Monika Langerová (CZE)	5
Irina Schönberger (GER)	5
Aynur Rzayeva (AZE)	0

Quarterfinals
Monika Langerová (CZE)	0
Irina Schönberger (GER)	5

=== Bottom half ===
==== Section 3 ====
Round of 32
Elżbieta Wójcik (POL)	4
Sunniva Hofstad (NOR)	1

Round of 16
Anastasiia Chernokolenko (UKR)	0
Elżbieta Wójcik (POL)	5
Büşra Işıldar (TUR)	3
Gabrielė Stonkutė (LTU)	2

Quarterfinals
Elżbieta Wójcik (POL)	5
Büşra Işıldar (TUR)	0

==== Section 4 ====
Round of 32
Ani Hovsepyan (ARM)	0
Cindy Ngamba (EOR)	5

Round of 16
Love Holgersson (SWE)	5
Nikolina Gajić (SRB)	0
Cindy Ngamba (EOR)	2
Aoife O'Rourke (IRL)	3

Quarterfinals
Love Holgersson (SWE)	0
Aoife O'Rourke (IRL)	5
