= 2023 IBA Women's World Boxing Championships – Heavyweight =

Heavyweight at the 2023 IBA Women's World Boxing Championships
- Venue: K. D. Jadhav Indoor Hall
- Location: New Delhi, India
- Dates: 16–26 March
- Competitors: 12 from 12 nations

Medalists
gold medal	Khadija El-Mardi	Morocco
silver medal	Lazzat Kungeibayeva	Kazakhstan
bronze medal	Diana Pyatak	Russia
bronze medal	Aynur Rzayeva	Azerbaijan

The Heavyweight competition at the 2023 IBA Women's World Boxing Championships was held between 16 and 26 March 2023.

== Results ==
Round of 16
(China) Zheng Lu	5
(Vietnam) Nguyễn Thị Phương Hoài	0
(Australia) Jessica Bagley	1
(Turkey) Mihriban Güneri	4
(Trinidad and Tobago) Eyed George	0
(New Zealand) Celine Lee-Lo	5
(Guyana) Abiola Jackman	0
(India) Nupur Sheoran	5

Quarter-finals
(Morocco) Khadija El-Mardi	5
(China) Zheng Lu	0
(Turkey) Mihriban Güneri
(Russia) Diana Pyatak	w/o
(Azerbaijan) Aynur Rzayeva	5
(New Zealand) Celine Lee-Lo	0
(India) Nupur Sheoran	3
(Kazakhstan) Lazzat Kungeibayeva	4

Semi-finals
(Morocco) Khadija El-Mardi	5
(Russia) Diana Pyatak	0
(Azerbaijan) Aynur Rzayeva	0
(Kazakhstan) Lazzat Kungeibayeva	5

Final
(Morocco) Khadija El-Mardi	4
(Kazakhstan) Lazzat Kungeibayeva	1
