= Boxing at the 2023 Pan American Games – Women's 75 kg =

Women's 75 kg at the 2023 Pan American Games
- Venue: Olympic Training Center
- Start date: October 20, 2023
- End date: October 27, 2023
- Competitors: 13 from 13 nations

Medalists
Gold medal	Tammara Thibeault	Canada
Silver medal	Atheyna Bylon	Panama
Bronze medal	Citlalli Ortiz	Mexico
Bronze medal	Viviane Pereira	Brazil

The Women's 75 kg competition of the boxing events at the 2023 Pan American Games in Santiago, Chile, was held between October 20 and 27 at the Olympic Training Center. A total of 13 boxers from 13 NOC's competed.

The two finalists will qualify for the 2024 Summer Olympics in Paris, France.

== Qualification ==
There was a quota of 130 boxers to compete at the games (ten per event). The host nation (Chile) received automatic qualification spots for all events. The remainder of the spots were awarded through various qualifying tournaments. However, the International Olympic Committee later decided the competition was an open registration event, meaning any NOC could enter a boxer into the event.

== Competition format ==
Like all Pan American boxing events, the competition is a straight single-elimination tournament. Both semifinal losers are awarded bronze medals, so no boxers compete again after their first loss. Bouts consist of 3 rounds "10-point must" scoring system used, where the winner of each round must be awarded 10 points and the loser a lesser amount, and the elimination of the padded headgear. Five judges scored each bout. The winner will be the boxer who scored the most at the end of the match.

== Results ==
Round of 16 (October 20)
Yakelín Estornell (CUB)	0
Citlalli Ortiz (MEX)	5
Milena Jiménez (DOM)
Tammara Thibeault (CAN)	RSC
Luisa Vásquez (COL)	0
Maryelis Yriza (VEN)	5
Eyed George (TTO)
Atheyna Bylon (PAN)	RSC
Viviane Pereira (BRA)	5
Lorena Balbuena (ARG)	0

Quarterfinals
Naomi Graham (USA)	0
Citlalli Ortiz (MEX)	5
Tammara Thibeault (CAN)	5
Maryelis Yriza (VEN)	0
Ingrith Maldonado (ECU)	0
Atheyna Bylon (PAN)	5
Viviane Pereira (BRA)	5
Kimberly Gittens (BAR)	0

Semifinals
Citlalli Ortiz (MEX)	0
Tammara Thibeault (CAN)	5
Atheyna Bylon (PAN)	5
Viviane Pereira (BRA)	0

Final
Tammara Thibeault (CAN)	5
Atheyna Bylon (PAN)	0
