= Citlalli Ortiz =

Mexican boxer (born 2000)

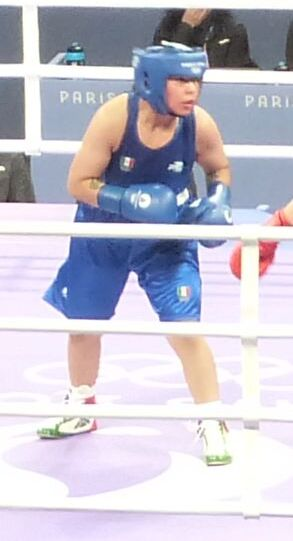
- Citlalli Ortiz at the 2024 Summer Olympics

Personal information
- Nickname: Bellatrix
- Nationality: Mexican
- Born: Citlalli Vanessa Ortiz; 19 January 2000 (age 26) Rancho Mirage, California, U.S.
- Height: 5 ft 3 in (160 cm)
- Weight: Super-middleweight

Boxing career
- Stance: Orthodox

Boxing record
- Total fights: 6
- Wins: 4
- Win by KO: 1
- Losses: 2
Medal record
Women's amateur boxing
Representing United States
IBA Youth and Junior World Boxing Championships
Gold medal – first place	2017 Guwahati	69kg
Representing Mexico
Central American and Caribbean Games
Silver medal – second place	2023 San Salvador	75kg
Pan American Games
Bronze medal – third place	2023 Santiago	75kg

Citlalli Vanessa Ortiz (born 19 January 2000) is an American-born Mexican professional boxer who has challenged for the WBA and WBC female super-middleweight titles. As an amateur she won a gold medal at the 2017 IBA Youth Women's World Championships, silver at the 2023 Central American and Caribbean Games and bronze at the 2023 Pan American Games. Ortiz also represented Mexico at the 2024 Summer Olympics.

== Biography ==
Having taken up boxing aged eight, Ortiz represented the United States at the 2017 IBA Youth Women's World Championships in India, winning the gold medal in the 69 kg category.

After being overlooked for the 2018 Summer Youth Olympics, she switched allegiances to Mexico, qualifying through family ties, although she had to serve a period of ineligibility due to her previously fighting for the United States.

Ortiz turned professional in 2021 and compiled a record of four wins and one defeat, before returning to the amateur ranks to make a run at qualifying for the 2024 Summer Olympics.

In Mexican colours and competing in the 75 kg division, she won a silver medal at the 2023 Central American and Caribbean Games in El Salvador and bronze at the 2023 Pan American Games in Chile.

Ortiz won three bouts, all via unanimous decision, at the World Boxing Olympic final qualification tournament held in Thailand across May and June 2024 to secure a spot at the Paris Games later that year, where she lost in the first round to fifth seed, and eventual bronze medalist, Caitlin Parker from Australia.

Returning to the professional ranks, Ortiz challenged WBA and WBC female super-middleweight champion Franchón Crews-Dezurn at Turning Stone Resort Casino in Verona, New York, on 6 June 2025. She lost via majority decision with two of the ringside judges scoring the fight 98–92 and 96–94 respectively for her opponent, while the third had it a 95–95 draw.
