= 2022 IBA Women's World Boxing Championships – Middleweight =

Middleweight at the 2022 IBA Women's World Boxing Championships
- Venue: Başakşehir Youth and Sports Facility
- Location: Istanbul, Turkey
- Dates: 11–20 May
- Competitors: 23 from 23 nations

Medalists
gold medal	Tammara Thibeault	Canada
silver medal	Atheyna Bylon	Panama
bronze medal	Rady Gramane	Mozambique
bronze medal	Davina Michel	France

The Middleweight competition at the 2022 IBA Women's World Boxing Championships was held from 11 to 20 May 2022.

== Results ==
=== Finals ===
Semi-finals
(Canada) Tammara Thibeault	5
(Mozambique) Rady Gramane	0
(Panama) Atheyna Bylon	5
(France) Davina Michel	0

Final
(Canada) Tammara Thibeault	4
(Panama) Atheyna Bylon	1

=== Top half ===
==== Section 1 ====
Round of 32
(Republic of Ireland) Aoife O'Rourke	1
(United States) Naomi Graham	4

Round of 16
(Canada) Tammara Thibeault	5
(United States) Naomi Graham	0
(Sweden) Love Holgersson	1
(Australia) Caitlin Parker	4

Quarterfinals
(Canada) Tammara Thibeault	5
(Australia) Caitlin Parker	0

==== Section 2 ====
Round of 32
(Mozambique) Rady Gramane	5
(Thailand) Pornnipa Chutee	0
(Kenya) Elizabeth Akinyi	0
(Ukraine) Karolina Makhno	5

Round of 16
(South Korea) Seong Su-yeon	2
(Mozambique) Rady Gramane	3
(Ukraine) Karolina Makhno	5
(Mongolia) Namjimyn Anu	0

Quarterfinals
(Mozambique) Rady Gramane	3
(Ukraine) Karolina Makhno	2

=== Bottom half ===
==== Section 3 ====
Round of 32
(Barbados) Kimberly Gittens	0
(Poland) Agata Kaczmarska	5
(Turkey) Büşra Işıldar	5
(Kazakhstan) Nadezhda Ryabets	0

Round of 16
(Panama) Atheyna Bylon	4
(Poland) Agata Kaczmarska	0
(Turkey) Büşra Işıldar	3
(Brazil) Viviane Pereira	2

Quarterfinals
(Panama) Atheyna Bylon	4
(Turkey) Büşra Işıldar	1

==== Section 4 ====
Round of 32
(France) Davina Michel	RSC
(South Africa) Geanne Dicks
(India) Saweety Boora	2
(England) Kerry Davis	3

Round of 16
(Uzbekistan) Mavluda Mavlonova	1
(France) Davina Michel	4
(England) Kerry Davis	w/o
(Germany) Irina Schönberger

Quarterfinals
(France) Davina Michel	5
(England) Kerry Davis	0
