= Peter Kadiru =

German boxer (born 1997)

Personal information
- Born: 24 June 1997 (age 29) Hamburg, Germany
- Height: 6 ft 4 1/2 in (194 cm)
- Weight: Heavyweight

Boxing career
- Stance: Orthodox

Boxing record
- Total fights: 25
- Wins: 23
- Win by KO: 13
- Losses: 2
Medal record
Men's amateur boxing
Representing Germany
European (U22) Championships
Gold medal – first place	2017 Braila	Super-heavyweight
European Youth Championships
Gold medal – first place	2014 Zagreb	Super-heavyweight
Gold medal – first place	2015 Kołobrzeg	Super-heavyweight
Youth Olympic Games
Gold medal – first place	2014 Nanjing	Super-heavyweight
Youth World Championships
Silver medal – second place	2014 Sofia	Super-heavyweight
German National Championships
Gold medal – first place	2017 Luebeck	Super-heavyweight
German Youth (U19) National Championships
Gold medal – first place	2015 Hamburg	Super-heavyweight
German Youth (U17) National Championships
Gold medal – first place	2013 Bad Blankenburg	Super-heavyweight

Peter Kadiru (born 24 June 1997) is a German professional boxer. He has challenged once for the WBA heavyweight title in July 2026. At regional level, he held the German heavyweight title from 2020 to 2021. As an amateur, he won a silver medal at the 2014 Youth World Championships, and gold at the 2014 Youth Olympics, and at the 2014 and 2015 European Youth Championships. He holds a notable win over former world cruiserweight champion Victor Emilio Ramírez.

== Amateur career ==
Kadiru had a very successful amateur career which saw him crowned the European and Youth Olympic champion. In the 2014 Youth Olympics final Kadiru avenged a loss against American Darmani Rock winning all three rounds on the judges scorecards.

== Professional career ==
=== Early career ===
Kadiru claimed the first major belt of his career after he won WBC Youth heavyweight title against Tomas Salek. Kadiru dropped Salek twice in the sixth round forcing the stoppage.

Kadiru suffered a huge career setback after losing for the first time as a pro against Argentine Marcos Antonio Aumada. Kadiru was dropped in the first round and was unable to beat the count. This was Kadirus first fight under his new promoter.

=== Kadiru vs. Ramirez ===
Kadiru claimed the biggest win of his career after he stopped former cruiserweight champion Victor Emilio Ramirez to claim the IBF Intercontinental title. After dominating the majority of the bout Ramirez decided to stay in his corner before the ninth round.

=== WBA heavyweight title challenge ===
==== Kadiru vs. Gassiev ====
On 6 July 2026, it was announced that Kadiru would step in on short notice to challenge the newly elevated WBA heavyweight champion Murat Gassiev on 11 July 2026 at the VTB Arena in Moscow, Russia. Kadiru replaced former French Olympian Tony Yoka, who was forced to withdraw from the world title bout during the final stages of his training camp due to a back injury.

== Professional boxing record ==
25 fights	23 wins	2 losses
By knockout	13	2
By decision	10	0

No.	Result	Record	Opponent	Type	Round, time	Date	Location	Notes
25	Loss	23–2	Murat Gassiev	TKO	6 (12), 1:00	11 Jul 2026	VTB Arena, Moscow, Russia	For WBA heavyweight title
24	Win	23–1	Senad Gashi	UD	10	15 May 2026	SAP Arena, Mannheim, Germany	Won vacant WBA Continental Europe heavyweight title
23	Win	22–1	Mauricio Nicolas Barragan	UD	8	20 Mar 2026	Fischauktionshalle, Hamburg, Germany	
22	Win	21–1	Selcuk Tezer	TKO	1 (8), 0:48	6 Dec 2025	Boxsporthalle Braamkamp, Hamburg, Germany	
21	Win	20–1	Osasu Otobo	TKO	1 (8), 2:16	5 Apr 2025	Kuhn Witte Audi Terminal, Hamburg, Germany	
20	Win	19–1	Djuar El Scheich	TKO	5 (12), 1:25	21 Sep 2024	Sporthalle, Hamburg, Germany	Retained IBF Inter-Continental heavyweight title
19	Win	18–1	Victor Emilio Ramírez	RTD	8 (12), 3:00	16 Mar 2024	Vogelsanghalle, Stralsund, Germany	Won vacant IBF Inter-Continental heavyweight title
18	Win	17–1	Jakub Sosinski	UD	8	28 Oct 2023	Zenith - Die Kulturhalle, Munich, Germany	
17	Win	16–1	Yassine Khedim	TKO	2 (8), 1:47	24 Jun 2023	Stadthalle, Rostock, Germany	
16	Win	15–1	Alen Lauriolle	RTD	1 (6), 3:00	1 Apr 2023	The O2 Arena, London, England	
15	Loss	14–1	Marcos Antonio Aumada	KO	1 (8), 0:56	5 Nov 2022	Porsche Zentrum, Hamburg, Germany	
14	Win	14–0	Tayfun Kurt	RTD	3 (8), 3:00	18 Jun 2022	Stadthalle, Rostock, Germany	
13	Win	13–0	Lukas Fajk	UD	6	5 Mar 2022	Sono, Brno, Czech Republic	
12	Win	12–0	Boris Estenfelder	UD	10	9 Oct 2021	GETEC Arena, Magdeburg, Germany	Retained German heavyweight title
11	Win	11–0	Adnan Redzovic	TKO	2 (8), 1:33	17 Jul 2021	Seebühne Elbauenpark, Magdeburg, Germany	
10	Win	10–0	Roman Gorst	UD	10	10 Oct 2020	GETEC Arena, Magdeburg, Germany	Won German heavyweight title
9	Win	9–0	Muhammed Ali Durmaz	KO	2 (8), 1:25	22 Aug 2020	Seebühne Elbauenpark, Magdeburg, Germany	
8	Win	8–0	Eugen Buchmueller	RTD	3 (8), 3:00	18 Jul 2020	Seebühne Elbauenpark, Magdeburg, Germany	
7	Win	7–0	Tomas Salek	TKO	6 (8), 2:20	18 Jan 2020	Edel-Optics.de Arena, Hamburg, Germany	Won vacant WBC Youth heavyweight title
6	Win	6–0	Pedro Martinez	RTD	4 (6), 3:00	16 Nov 2019	Halle Messe Arena, Halle, Germany	
5	Win	5–0	Andrei Mazanik	UD	6	28 Sep 2019	Stadthalle, Magdeburg, Germany	
4	Win	4–0	Juan Torres	UD	4	15 Jun 2019	MGM Grand Garden Arena, Paradise, Nevada, US	
3	Win	3–0	Paolo Iannucci	UD	6	11 May 2019	Stadthalle, Magdeburg, Germany	
2	Win	2–0	Vincenzo Febbo	KO	4 (6), 0:52	13 Apr 2019	Erdgas Arena, Halle, Germany	
1	Win	1–0	Artur Kubiak	UD	6	2 Mar 2019	Maritim Hotel, Magdeburg, Germany	

Sporting positions
Regional boxing titles
Vacant Title last held by Daniel Dubois	WBC Youth heavyweight champion 18 January 2020 – ? Vacated	Vacant
Preceded by Roman Gorst	German heavyweight champion 10 October 2020 – March 2024; Vacated	Vacant Title next held by Viktor Jurk
Vacant Title last held by Joseph Parker	IBF Inter-Continental heavyweight champion 16 March 2024 – May 2026; Vacated	Vacant Title next held by Filip Hrgović
Vacant Title last held by Granit Shala	WBA Continental Europe heavyweight champion 15 May 2026 – present	Incumbent
