= Boxing at the 2019 Pan American Games – Women's 75 kg =

Women's Middleweight at the 2019 Pan American Games
- Venue: Miguel Grau Coliseum
- Dates: July 28 – August 2, 2019
- Competitors: 8 from 8 nations

Medalists
Gold medal	Naomi Graham	United States
Silver medal	Tammara Thibeault	Canada
Bronze medal	Flávia Figueiredo	Brazil
Bronze medal	Érika Pachito	Ecuador

The Women's middleweight competition of the boxing events at the 2019 Pan American Games in Lima, Peru, was held between the 28 of July and the 2 of August 2019 at the Miguel Grau Coliseum.

Like all Pan American boxing events, the competition is a straight single-elimination tournament. Both semifinal losers are awarded bronze medals, so no boxers compete again after their first loss. Bouts consist of a 3 rounds "10-point must" scoring system used in the pro game, where the winner of each round must be awarded 10 points and the loser a lesser amount, and the elimination of the padded headgear. Five judges scored each bout. The winner will be the boxer who scored the most at the end of the match.

Jessica Caicedo originally won the gold medal but her medal was rescinded in December 2019 for doping.

== Results ==
=== Bracket ===
Quarterfinals; July 28, 2019
Tammara Thibeault (CAN)	RSC
Zulena Alvarez (GUA)
~~Jessica Caicedo (COL)~~	4
Érika Pachito (ECU)	1
Flávia Figueiredo (BRA)	5
Fredly Ramírez (NCA)	0
Ana Salas (MEX)
Naomi Graham (USA)	RSC

Semifinals; July 30, 2019
Tammara Thibeault (CAN)	2
~~Jessica Caicedo (COL)~~	3
Flávia Figueiredo (BRA)	2
Naomi Graham (USA)	3

Final; August 2, 2019
~~Jessica Caicedo (COL)~~	4
Naomi Graham (USA)	1
