= Yenebier Guillén =

Dominican Republic boxer (born 1986)

Personal information
- Full name: Yenebier Adelina Guillén Benítez
- Nationality: Dominican
- Born: December 8, 1986 (age 39) Santo Domingo Este, Santo Domingo Province
- Height: 170 cm (5 ft 7 in)
- Weight: 75 kg (165 lb)

Sport
- Sport: Boxing
- Weight class: Light heavyweight
Medal record
Women's amateur boxing
Representing the Dominican Republic
Pan American Games
Silver medal – second place	2011 Guadalajara	75 kg
Silver medal – second place	2015 Toronto	75 kg
Pan American Sports Festival
Silver medal – second place	2014 Mexico	75 kg
Bolivarian Games
Gold medal – first place	2013 Trujillo	75 kg
Central American and Caribbean Games
Gold medal – first place	2014 Veracruz	75 kg

Yenebier Adelina Guillén Benítez (born December 8, 1986) is a Dominican boxer who competes as a 75 kilogram middleweight, Pan American Champion and Female Boxer in 2013 and silver medal at the 2011 Pan American Games. She also won the gold medal at the 2008 Central American and Caribbean Championship, 2013 Bolivarian Games and 2014 Central American and Caribbean Games.

== Personal and early life ==
Guillén was born on December 8, 1986 in Santo Domingo Este Both her father and grandfather were boxers and her mother was a 400 metres competitor. She played softball before starting in Boxing, practicing against their siblings and friends. She is married, is bisexual but she confessed that she is postponing maternity in order to pursue the dream of becoming the first Dominican Republic Olympic medalist. As of February 2014, she is pursuing a degree in physical education. She is 170 cm (5 ft 7 in) tall 75 kilograms (165 lb).

== Career ==
Guillén won the 2008 Central American and Caribbean Championship held in Trinidad and Tobago returning to the same venue shortly afterwards to win the 2008 Pan American Championship.

For her performance during the 2008 year, she was selected by the Dominican Republic Boxing writers "Female Boxer of the Year".

She competed at the 2010 AIBA Women World Boxing Championships, but was defeated by the Dutch boxer Nouchka Fontijn in the first round of the preliminary round.

At the 2nd Panamerican qualifier held in Ecuador, Yenebier earn the gold medal and the ticket to the 2011 Pan American Games. There, she planned to qualify to the 2012 Summer Olympics. In the 75 kg of the Pan American Games she defeated 21–12 to the Brazilian former world champion Roseli Feitosa in the semifinals and finally won the silver medal after losing 15-11 from the Canadian Mary Spencer.

Early 2012, Guillén received the 2011 Athlete of the year in Boxing award from the Dominican Republic Olympic Committee.

In Qinhuangdao, Guillén after winning the first two rounds, lost 11–13 in her Round of 32 debut match of the 2012 AIBA Women's World Boxing Championships to Poland's Lidia Fidura.

=== 2013 ===
Guillén started 2013 by winning the gold medal at the Copa Independencia Nacional, held in Santiago, Dominican Republic. There she won 21–5 against the Venezuelan Francelys Carmona.

During the AIBA Women's Pan American Championship in May, Guillén overcame the three times world champion Mary Spencer in the semifinals before defeating 15–7 to the American Franchon Crews in the gold medal combat.

In November, Guillén had to settle with the silver medal during the La Romana Tournamente, celebrated in La Romana, Dominican Republic, when she lost 1-2 from the Panamanian Atheyna Baylon. Later that month, she won the gold medal at the 2013 Bolivarian Games held in Trujillo, Peru. She defeated 3–0 to the Colombian Jessica Caicedo in the final.

=== 2014 ===
For her merits during the 2013, Guillén was awarded Female Boxer of the Year award by the Dominican Republic Boxing Federation, Athlete of the Year in Boxing by the Dominican Republic Olympic Committee, and American Confederation of International Boxing Association's Female Boxer of the Year

Guillén won the gold medal in the first qualification for the Central American and Caribbean Games held in May in Tijuana, Mexico, when she defeated 2–1 to the Panamanian Atheyna Bylon. In the Cheo Aponte Tournament held in Puerto Rico, she was awarded silver medalist after losing the final 0–3 to the American Claressa Shields. Later she repeated the gold medal in the Venezuelan competition Batalla de Carabobo, She then participated in the Pan American Sports Festival, winning the silver medal after losing to the American Claressa Shield. Guillén defeated the Mexican Alma Ibarra to win the 75 kg gold medal at the 2014 Central American and Caribbean Games in Veracruz, Mexico.

=== 2015 ===
Guillén competed in boxing at the 2015 Pan American Games – Women's light heavyweight. She reached the gold medal final but was defeated.
