= Zemfira Magomedalieva =

Russian boxer (born 1988)

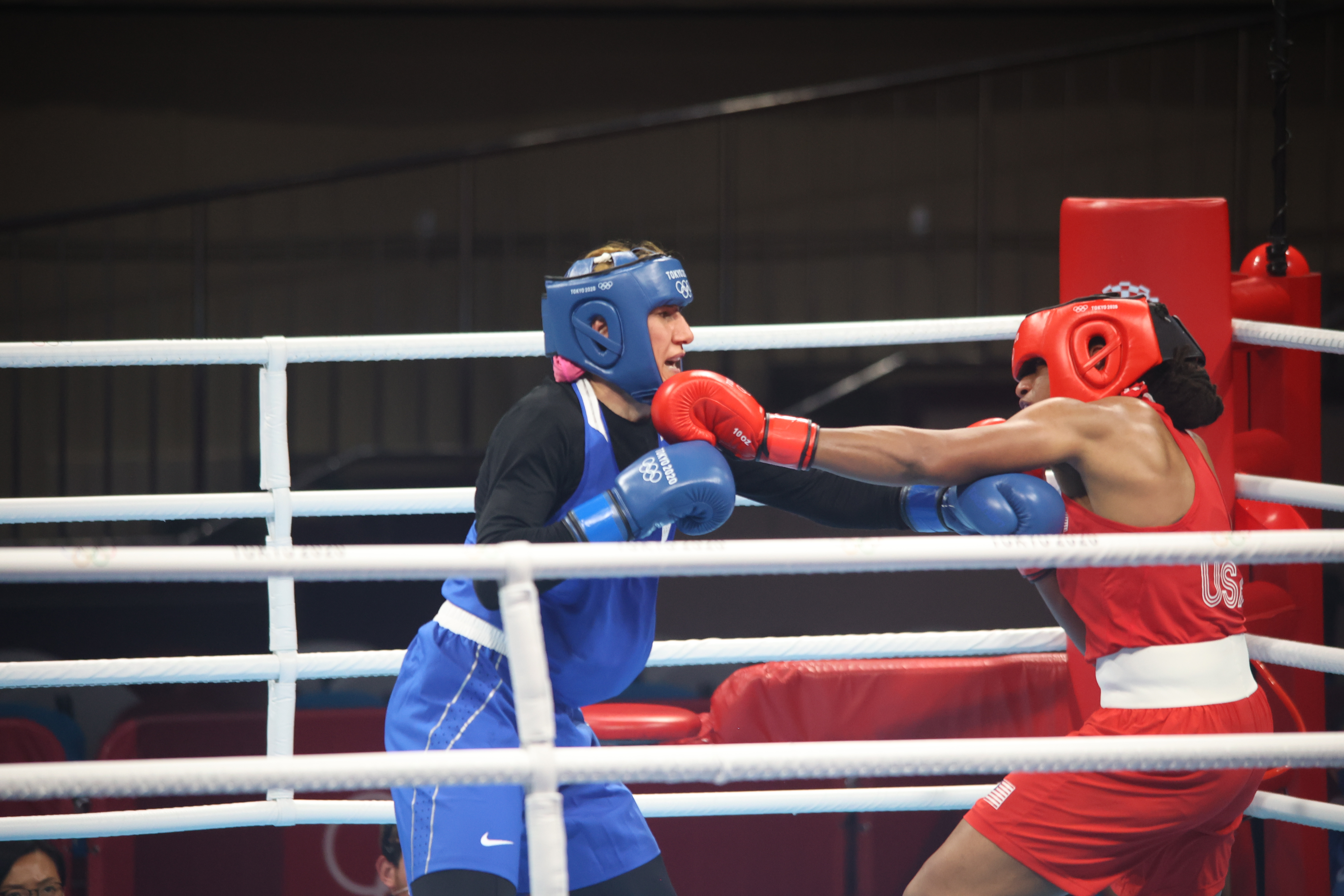
- Magomedalieva (left) against Naomi Graham at the 2020 Summer Olympics

Personal information
- Nationality: (Russia) Russian
- Born: 8 February 1988 (age 38) Tlyarata, Dagestan ASSR, RSFSR, USSR (now Dagestan, Russia)

Boxing career
- Weight class: Light heavyweight

Boxing record
- Total fights: 4
- Wins: 3
- Win by KO: 0
- Losses: 1
- Draws: 0
- No contests: 0
Medal record
Women's amateur boxing
Representing (Russia) ROC
Olympic Games
Bronze medal – third place	2020 Tokyo	Middleweight
Representing Russia
World Championships
Gold medal – first place	2014 Jeju City	Heavyweight
Gold medal – first place	2019 Ulan-Ude	Light heavyweight
European Championships
Gold medal – first place	2016 Sofia	Heavyweight
Gold medal – first place	2019 Alcobendas	Heavyweight

Zemfira Ramazanovna Magomedalieva (Note: In Russia, her name is spelled 'Zenfira'; despite her first name and patronymic, she is not related to the local rock star Zemfira Ramazanova.) (Russian: Зенфира Рамазанова Магомедалиева, romanized: Zenfira Magomedalieva, IPA: [zʲɪnˈfʲirə məɡəmʲɪdɐˈlʲi(ɪ̯)ɪvə]; born 8 February 1988) is a Russian boxer.

She won a medal at the 2019 AIBA Women's World Boxing Championships. She competed in the middleweight division at the 2020 Summer Olympics where she won a bronze medal.

== Early life and education ==
Magomedalieva was born on 8 February 1988 in the Tlyaratinsky District of the Dagestan ASSR.

While studying at Dagestan State Pedagogical University, she competed for the Dagestan team in shot put. She later switched to boxing under coach Alexey Shakhsinov and currently trains under Sukhrab Manapov.

== Amateur career ==
=== World and European Championships ===
In November 2014, Magomedalieva won the gold medal at the Women’s World Boxing Championships held in Jeju, South Korea. On her way to victory, she defeated Aynur Rzayeva (Azerbaijan), Kavita (India), Wang Shijin (China), and Lazzat Kungeibayeva (Kazakhstan).

Magomedalieva became the first female boxer from Dagestan to win a world championship title. She received a congratulatory telegram from Russian president Vladimir Putin.

In March 2015, she won the Russian Women’s Boxing Championship in Saransk, defeating Elmira Ramazanova in the final.

On 3 August 2015, by order of the Minister of Sport No. 109-ng, she was awarded the title International Master of Sports of Russia.

At the 2019 AIBA Women’s World Boxing Championships in Ulan-Ude, she defeated Turkish boxer Elif Guneri in the final by unanimous decision, winning her second world title.

=== Olympic Games ===
At the 2020 Summer Olympics in Tokyo (held in 2021), Magomedalieva competed in the 75 kg weight category. She advanced to the semifinals, where she lost to Li Qian of China, earning a bronze medal.

=== Later career ===
In November 2023, she won a bronze medal at the Russian Women’s Boxing Championship in Ufa in the 81 kg category, losing in the semifinal by a 0:5 decision to Saltanat Medenova.

== Achievements ==
- Gold medal — Women’s World Boxing Championships (Ulan-Ude, 2019)
- Gold medal — Women’s World Boxing Championships (Jeju, 2014)
- Gold medal — Russian Women’s Boxing Championship (Saransk, 2015)
- Gold medal — Women’s European Boxing Championships (Sofia, 2016)
- Gold medal — Women’s European Boxing Championships (Madrid, 2019)

== Awards ==
- Medal of the Order “For Merit to the Fatherland”, 2nd class (11 August 2021) — for her significant contribution to the development of Russian sport, outstanding athletic achievements, determination, perseverance, and will to win, demonstrated at the Games of the XXXII Olympiad in Tokyo, Japan.[13]
