= Boxing at the 2023 Central American and Caribbean Games =

- Venue: Coliseo Complejo Deportivo "El Polvorín"
- Location: (El Salvador) San Salvador
- Dates: 30 June – 6 July

The boxing competition at the 2023 Central American and Caribbean Games will be held in San Salvador, El Salvador from 30 June to 6 July at the Coliseo Complejo Deportivo "El Polvorín".

== Medal table ==
* Host nation (El Salvador)

| Rank | Nation | Gold | Silver | Bronze | Total |
|---|---|---|---|---|---|
| 1 | Colombia (COL) | 5 | 4 | 1 | 10 |
| 2 | Dominican Republic (DOM) | 2 | 4 | 3 | 9 |
| 3 | Cuba (CUB) | 2 | 2 | 5 | 9 |
| 4 | Puerto Rico (PUR) | 2 | 0 | 2 | 4 |
| 5 | Mexico (MEX) | 1 | 1 | 4 | 6 |
| 6 | Panama (PAN) | 1 | 0 | 1 | 2 |
| 7 | Centro Caribe Sports (CCS) | 0 | 1 | 1 | 2 |
| 7 | Venezuela (VEN) | 0 | 1 | 1 | 2 |
| 9 | Costa Rica (CRC) | 0 | 0 | 5 | 5 |
| 10 | Barbados (BAR) | 0 | 0 | 1 | 1 |
| 10 | Dominica (DMA) | 0 | 0 | 1 | 1 |
| 10 | Trinidad and Tobago (TTO) | 0 | 0 | 1 | 1 |
| Totals (12 entries) | | 13 | 13 | 26 | 52 |

== Medal summary ==
=== Men's events ===
| Event | Gold | Silver | Bronze |
|---|---|---|---|
| -51 kg | Yuberjen Martínez; Colombia | Junior Alcántara; Dominican Republic | Erislán Romero; Cuba Jabali Breedy; Barbados |
| -57 kg | Yilmar González; Colombia | Yoel Finol; Venezuela | José de los Santos; Dominican Republic Caleb Tirado; Puerto Rico |
| -63.5 kg | Alexy de la Cruz; Dominican Republic | Erislandy Álvarez; Cuba | Yader Centeno; Costa Rica José Viáfara; Colombia |
| -71 kg | Marco Verde; Mexico | Jhonatan Arboleda; Colombia | Eduardo Beckford; Panama Jorge Cuéllar; Cuba |
| -80 kg | Cristian Pinales; Dominican Republic | Jhojan Caicedo; Colombia | Arlen López; Cuba Wyatt Trujillo; Centro Caribe Sports |
| -92 kg | Julio La Cruz; Cuba | Marlon Hurtado; Colombia | Daniel Guzmán; Dominican Republic Carlos Rodríguez; Mexico |
| +92 kg | Fernando Arzola; Cuba | Cristian Salcedo; Colombia | Charles Jno; Dominica Nigel Paul; Trinidad and Tobago |

=== Women's events ===
| Event | Gold | Silver | Bronze |
|---|---|---|---|
| -50 kg | Ingrit Valencia; Colombia | Aylin Jamez; Centro Caribe Sports | Valeria Cárdenas; Costa Rica Krystal Rosado; Puerto Rico |
| -54 kg | Yeni Arias; Colombia | Estefany Almanzar; Dominican Republic | Nicole Barrantes; Costa Rica Gloria Fernandez; Mexico |
| -57 kg | Ashleyann Lozada; Puerto Rico | Legnis Cala; Cuba | Miguelina Hernández; Dominican Republic Dulce Gómez; Mexico |
| -60 kg | Angie Valdés; Colombia | Jessica Muñoz; Dominican Republic | Esmeralda Falcón; Mexico Pamela Sánchez; Costa Rica |
| -66 kg | Stephanie Pineiro; Puerto Rico | María Moronta; Dominican Republic | Arianne Imbert; Cuba Juliannys Alvarez; Venezuela |
| -75 kg | Atheyna Bylon; Panama | Citlalli Ortiz; Mexico | Luisa Vásquez; Colombia Yakelin Estornell; Cuba |
