= Boxing at the 2015 Pan American Games – Women's light heavyweight =

Women's light heavyweight at the 2015 Pan American Games
- Venue: Oshawa Sports Centre
- Dates: July 20–24
- Competitors: 8 from 8 nations

Medalists
Gold medal	Claressa Shields	United States
Silver medal	Yenebier Guillén	Dominican Republic
Bronze medal	Ariane Fortin	Canada
Bronze medal	Lucía Pérez	Argentina

The light heavyweight competition of the boxing events at the 2015 Pan American Games in Toronto, Ontario, Canada, was held between the 20 and 24 of July at the Oshawa Sports Centre. The defending champion was Mary Spencer of Canada. Light heavyweights is limited to those boxers weighing less than or equal to 75 kilograms.

Like all Pan American boxing events, the competition is a straight single-elimination tournament. Both semifinal losers are awarded bronze medals, so no boxers compete again after their first loss. Bouts consist of a 3 rounds "10-point must" scoring system used in the pro game, where the winner of each round must be awarded 10 points and the loser a lesser amount. AIBA officials are waiting to see how things go in the men's game before making a decision to take headgear off women fighters. Five judges scored each bout. The winner will be the boxer who scored the most at the end of the match.

== Qualification ==
A total of eight boxers qualified to compete.

== Results ==
=== Bracket ===
Quarterfinals; July 20, 2015
Claressa Shields (USA)	3
Flávia Figueiredo (BRA)	0
Lucía Pérez (ARG)	2
Jessica Caicedo (COL)	0
Yenebier Guillén (DOM)	TKO R2 1:20
Chimere Taylor (TTO)
Francelis Carmona (VEN)	0
Ariane Fortin (CAN)	3

Semifinals; July 21, 2015
Claressa Shields (USA)	3
Lucía Pérez (ARG)	0
Yenebier Guillén (DOM)	2
Ariane Fortin (CAN)	0

Finals; July 24, 2015
Claressa Shields (USA)	3
Yenebier Guillén (DOM)	0
