= Jacinta Umunnakwe =

Nigerian boxer (born 1993)

Personal information
- Nationality: Nigerian
- Born: 12 April 1993 (age 33)

Boxing career
Medal record
Women's amateur boxing
Representing Nigeria
Commonwealth Games
Bronze medal – third place	2022 Birmingham	Middleweight
African Games
Gold medal – first place	2023 Accra	Light heavyweight

Jacinta Umunnakwe (born 12 April 1993) is a Nigerian boxer. She won a bronze medal in the 2022 Commonwealth Games in the Middleweight boxing .

She won the gold medal in the women's 81 kg event at the 2023 African Games held in Accra, Ghana.
