= Boxing at the 2011 Pan American Games – Women's light heavyweight =

Women's light heavyweight at the 2011 Pan American Games
- Venue: Expo Guadalajara Arena
- Dates: October 23 – 28
- Competitors: 7 from 7 nations

Medalists
Gold medal	Mary Spencer	Canada
Silver medal	Yenebier Guillén	Dominican Republic
Bronze medal	Roseli Feitosa	Brazil
Bronze medal	Alma Ibarra	Mexico

The women's light heavyweight competition of the boxing events at the 2011 Pan American Games in Guadalajara, Mexico, was held between October 23 and 28 at the Expo Guadalajara Arena. Light heavyweights were limited to those boxers weighing less than or equal to 75 kilograms. This will be the first time women's boxing will take place at the Pan American Games.

Like all Pan American boxing events, the competition was a straight single-elimination tournament. Both semifinal losers were awarded bronze medals, so no boxers competed again after their first loss. Bouts consisted of four rounds of two minutes each, with one-minute breaks between rounds. Punches scored only if the white area on the front of the glove made full contact with the front of the head or torso of the opponent. Five judges scored each bout; three of the judges had to signal a scoring punch within one second for the punch to score. The winner of the bout was the boxer who scored the most valid punches by the end of the bout.

== Schedule ==
All times are Central Standard Time (UTC-6).

Date	Time	Round
October 23, 2011	14:00	Quarterfinals
October 26, 2011	19:00	Semifinals
October 28, 2011	19:00	Final

== Results ==
=== Bracket ===
Quarterfinals
Tiffany Reddick (ISV)
Yenebier Guillén (DOM)	RSC
Mary Spencer (CAN)	17
Franchon Crews (USA)	7
Ledy Mayorga (NCA)	3
Alma Ibarra (MEX)	16

Semifinals
Roseli Feitosa (BRA)	12
Yenebier Guillén (DOM)	21
Mary Spencer (CAN)	19
Alma Ibarra (MEX)	5

Finals
Yenebier Guillén (DOM)	11
Mary Spencer (CAN)	15
