= Boxing at the 2022 Commonwealth Games – Women's middleweight =

Boxing competitions

Boxing – Women's middleweight at the 2022 Commonwealth Games
- Venue: National Exhibition Centre Hall 4
- Dates: July 29 – 7 August 2022
- Competitors: 9 from 9 nations

Medalists
gold medal	Tammara Thibeault	Canada
silver medal	Rady Gramane	Mozambique
bronze medal	Jacinta Umunnakwe	Nigeria
bronze medal	Caitlin Parker	Australia

The Women's middleweight boxing competitions at the 2022 Commonwealth Games in Birmingham, England took place between July 29 and August 7 at National Exhibition Centre Hall 4. Middleweights were limited to those boxers weighing between 71 and 75 kilograms.

Like all Commonwealth boxing events, the competition was a straight single-elimination tournament. Both semifinal losers were awarded bronze medals, so no boxers competed again after their first loss. Bouts consisted of three rounds of three minutes each, with one-minute breaks between rounds.

== Schedule ==
The schedule is as follows:

Date	Round
Friday 29 July	Preliminaries
Wednesday 3 August	Quarter-finals
Saturday 6 August	Semi-finals
Sunday 7 August 2022	Final

== Results ==
The draw is as follows:

=== Bracket ===
Preliminaries
Ornella Sathoud (GHA)	0
Kerry Davis (ENG)	4

Quarterfinals
Rady Gramane (MOZ)	5
Kerry Davis (ENG)	0
Jacinta Umunnakwe (NGR)	WO
Mele Ula (TGA)
Elizabeth Andiego (KEN)	0
Caitlin Parker (AUS)	5
Hepseba Angela (CAY)
Tammara Thibeault (CAN)	RSC

Semifinals
Rady Gramane (MOZ)	5
Jacinta Umunnakwe (NGR)	0
Caitlin Parker (AUS)	0
Tammara Thibeault (CAN)	5

Final
Rady Gramane (MOZ)	0
Tammara Thibeault (CAN)	5

=== Notes ===
- Mele Ula was disqualified due to lacking Tongan citizenship.
