= Millicent Agboegbulem =

Nigerian boxer (born 1983)

Personal information
- Nationality: Nigerian
- Born: 18 June 1983 (age 43) Nigeria
- Weight: Middleweight

Boxing career
Medal record
Women's amateur boxing
Representing Nigeria
Commonwealth Games
Bronze medal – third place	2018 Gold Coast	Middleweight

Millicent 'Milli' Agboegbulem (born 18 June 1983) is a Nigerian amateur boxer based in Australia. An Australian Super Welterweight champion, she also won a bronze medal at the 2018 Commonwealth Games.

== Career ==
Millicent competed at the 2018 Commonwealth Games. She won a bronze medal in the middleweight event against Caitlin Parker.

In March 2023 Agboegbulem defeated Desley Robinson to claim the vacant Australian Super Welterweight Champion title. In July 2023 as the headliner for the first televised all-female fight card in Australian boxing, Agboegbulem defended her title from fancied challenger Tayla Harris. Harris was larger and had previously been undefeated, but lost in an eight round majority decision. Commentators praised Agboegbulem for her supreme fitness and "big overhand right hand".

== Professional boxing record ==
5 fights	5 wins	0 losses
By knockout	2	0
By decision	3	0
