= Luka Plantić =

Croatian boxer (born 1996)

Personal information
- Nationality: Croatian
- Born: 29 October 1996 (age 29) Zagreb, Croatia
- Height: 181 cm (5 ft 11 in)
- Weight: Super middleweight

Boxing career
- Stance: Orthodox

Boxing record
- Total fights: 14
- Wins: 13
- Win by KO: 10
- Losses: 1
Medal record
Men's amateur boxing
Representing Croatia
European Championships
Bronze medal – third place	2022 Yerevan	Light heavyweight
Summer Youth Olympics
Bronze medal – third place	2014 Nanjing	75kg
Youth and Junior World Boxing Championships
Silver medal – second place	2014 Sofia	75kg

Luka Plantić (born 29 October 1996) is a Croatian professional boxer. As an amateur, he won the bronze medal at the 2022 European Amateur Boxing Championships in the light heavyweight (-81 kg) category.

== Amateur boxing career ==
In 2014, Plantić was Croatian youth middleweight champion, won the gold medal at the European Youth Championships in Zagreb, the silver medal at the Youth World Boxing Championships in Sofia, and the bronze medal at the Summer Youth Olympics in Nanjing.

In the adult category, Plantić was Croatian middleweight champion in 2015, 2016 and 2017 and Croatian light heavyweight champion in 2020 and 2021. in April 2016, he was eliminated in the preliminary round of the European Olympic qualification in Samsun against Arjon Kajoshi, and lost in the quarter-finals of the U22 European Championships in Brăila against Viktor Daschkewitsch in March 2017. In 2019, he won the Balkan Championships in Antalya.

In the European Olympic qualification in London in March 2020, Plantić defeated Umar Jambekov before the tournament was interrupted due to the COVID-19 pandemic. In the continuation of the qualification in Paris in June 2021, he defeated Gor Nersesyan and Emmet Brennan, before he was narrowly defeated by Benjamin Whittaker 2–3 in the semifinals and thus qualified for the 2020 Summer Olympics in Tokyo.

== Professional boxing career ==
Plantić made his professional debut against Moris Markowitsch on 17 March 2018. He won the fight by a fifth-round knockout. His next professional bout came four years later, as he was booked to face Geard Ajetovic on 19 February 2022. Ajetovic retired from the fight at the end of the third round. Plantić made a step-up against the experienced Ryno Liebenberg on 1 September 2022. He won the fight by a fourth-round knockout, flooring Liebenberg with an uppercut.

Plantić faced the multiple-time world title challenger Khoren Gevor for the vacant WBC International Silver super-middleweight title on 17 December 2022, at the Sportska Dvorana Bilankusa in Solin, Croatia. He won the fight by unanimous decision, with scores of 97–93, 100–90 and 99–92.

He faced Jack Cullen for the vacant WBC International super-middleweight title at Frankenstolz Arena in Aschaffenburg, Germany, on 6 April 2024, winning via technical knockout in the fifth round.

Plantić challenged WBC interim super-middleweight champion Lester Martínez at the USC Galen Center in Los Angeles, California, USA on 29 August 2026, losing by technical knockout in the 10th round.

== Professional boxing record ==
14 fights	13 wins	1 loss
By knockout	10	1
By decision	3	0

No.	Result	Record	Opponent	Type	Round, time	Date	Location	Notes
14	Loss	13–1	Lester Martínez	TKO	10 (12), 2:23	29 Aug 2026	USC Galen Center, Los Angeles, California, US	For WBC interim super-middleweight title
13	Win	13–0	Shadir Musa Bwogi	TKO	9 (10), 2:01	23 Nov 2025	Tirana Olympic Park, Tirana, Albania	Retained WBC International super middleweight title
12	Win	12–0	Bruno Damian Acosta	UD	10	23 May 2025	Cibona, Zagreb, Croatia	Retained WBC International super middleweight title
11	Win	11–0	Martin Ezequiel Bulacio	UD	10	8 Nov 2024	York Hall, London, United Kingdom	Retained WBC International super middleweight title
10	Win	10–0	Catalin Paraschiveanu	KO	3 (10), 2:13	7 Sep 2024	Motorworld, Cologne, Germany	Retained WBC International super middleweight title
9	Win	9–0	Almir Skrijelj	TKO	1 (8), 2:00	22 Jun 2024	Showpalast, Munich, Germany	
8	Win	8–0	Jack Cullen	TKO	5 (10), 2:35	6 Apr 2024	Frankenstolz Arena, Aschaffenburg, Germany	Won vacant WBC International super middleweight title
7	Win	7–0	Diego Ramirez	KO	4 (10), 1:10	7 Oct 2023	Sportska Dvorana Bilankusa, Solin, Croatia	Retained WBC International Silver super middleweight title
6	Win	6–0	Yusuf Kanguel	TKO	10 (10), 2:10	3 Jun 2023	Universum Gym, Hamburg, Germany	Retained WBC International Silver super middleweight title
5	Win	5–0	Tomas Bezvoda	TKO	6 (8), 2:49	4 Feb 2023	Friedrich-Ebert-Halle, Ludwigshafen, Germany	
4	Win	4–0	Khoren Gevor	UD	10	17 Dec 2022	Sportska Dvorana Bilankusa, Solin, Croatia	Won vacant WBC International Silver super middleweight title
3	Win	3–0	Ryno Liebenberg	KO	4 (8), 0:50	1 Sep 2022	Gradina, Solin, Croatia	
2	Win	2–0	Geard Ajetović	RTD	3 (8), 3:00	19 Feb 2022	Universum Gym, Hamburg, Germany	
1	Win	1–0	Moris Markowitsch	KO	5 (6), 1:12	17 Mar 2018	Altrheinhalle, Rastatt, Germany	

== Personal life ==
His older brother Damir was a professional boxer, savate boxer and kickboxer and younger brother Patrick is amateur boxer.
