= EOC Refugee Team at the 2023 European Games =

- IOC code: ERT
- NOC: European Olympic Committees

in Kraków and Małopolska, Poland 21 June – 2 July 2023
- Competitors: 4 in 2 sports
- Flag bearers: Cindy Ngamba; Kasra Mehdipournejad

European Games appearances (overview)
- 2015; 2019; 2023; 2027

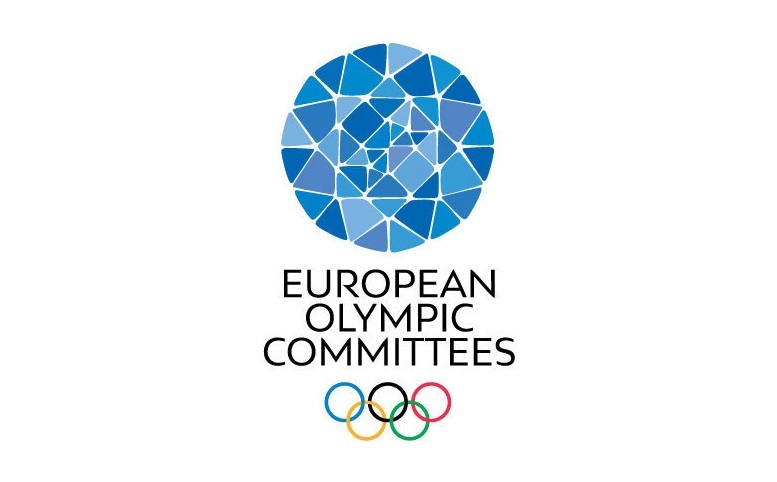
Flag used by EOF Refugee Team

An EOC Refugee Team competed at the 2023 European Games in Kraków and Małopolska, Poland, from 21 June to 2 July 2023, as independent Olympic participants.

The team competed under the country code ERT.

== Symbols ==
During the opening ceremony, the team used a flag depicting the logo of the European Olympic Committees. However, in official games material, the team is represented by a slightly different flag that omits the "European Olympic Committees" lettering. During the Parade of Nations, the team entered after Ukraine and before Poland, the host nation.

== Team Selection ==
The team was selected on 26 April 2023, represented in the following list, together with each competitor's country of origin and their host National Olympic Committee (NOC).

Athlete	Country of origin	Host NOC	Sport	Event
Dina Pouryounes	Iran	Netherlands	Taekwondo	Women's -46kg
Kasra Mehdipournejad	Iran	Germany	Taekwondo	Men's -80kg
Cindy Ngamba	Cameroon	Great Britain	Boxing	Women's 75kg
Farid Walizadeh	Afghanistan	Portugal	Boxing	Women's 66 kg

== Competitors ==
Sport	Men	Women	Total
Boxing	1	1	2
Taekwondo	1	1	2
Total	2	2	4

== Boxing ==
Athlete	Event	Round of 32	Round of 16	Quarterfinal	Semi-final	Final	
Athlete	Event	Opposition Result	Opposition Result	Opposition Result	Opposition Result	Opposition Result	Rank
Farid Walizadeh	Men's featherweight	Bye	Ibrahim (SWE); L 0–5	Did not advance			
Cindy Ngamba	Women's middleweight	Hovsepyan (ARM); W 5–0	O'Rourke (IRL); L 2–3	Did not advance			

== Taekwondo ==
Athlete	Event	Round of 16	Quarterfinal	Semi-final	Repechage	Final	
Athlete	Event	Opposition Result	Opposition Result	Opposition Result	Opposition Result	Opposition Result	Rank
Kasra Mehdipournejad	Men's -80 kg	Nikolić (CRO); W 2–0	Cintado (ESP); L 0–2	Did not advance			
Dina Pouryounes	Women's -46 kg	Komnenović (SRB); W 2–1	Zampetti (ITA); L 0–2	Did not advance	Akbarova (AZE); L 0–2	Did not advance	7

== See also ==
- Refugee Olympic Team at the Olympics
- EOC Refugee Team at the European Youth Olympic Festival
