= Flávia Figueiredo =

Brazilian boxer

Personal information
- Born: Campinas, Brazil

Sport
- Sport: Boxing
- Weight class: Middleweight, Light-heavyweight
Medal record
Women's amateur boxing
Representing Brazil
Pan American Games
Bronze medal – third place	2019 Lima	75 kg

Flávia Figueiredo is a Brazilian boxer. She won a bronze medal in the 75 kg division at the 2019 Pan American Games, having lost in the quarter-finals to Claressa Shields at the 2015 edition. In 2021, Figueiredo was suspended from boxing after failing an out of competition anti-doping test, with the substance involved being ostarine.
