= 2022 IBA Women's World Boxing Championships – Heavyweight =

Heavyweight at the 2022 IBA Women's World Boxing Championships
- Venue: Başakşehir Youth and Sports Facility
- Location: Istanbul, Turkey
- Dates: 13–20 May
- Competitors: 9 from 9 nations

Medalists
gold medal	Şennur Demir	Turkey
silver medal	Khadija El-Mardi	Morocco
bronze medal	Lidia Fidura	Poland
bronze medal	Mokhira Abdullaeva	Uzbekistan

The Heavyweight competition at the 2022 IBA Women's World Boxing Championships was held from 13 to 20 May 2022.

== Results ==
Round of 16
(Turkey) Şennur Demir	5
(Kazakhstan) Lazzat Kungeibayeva	0

Quarter-finals
(Colombia) Diana Romero
(Turkey) Şennur Demir	RSC
(Ukraine) Mariia Lovchynska	0
(Poland) Lidia Fidura	5
(India) Nandini Singh	0
(Morocco) Khadija El-Mardi	5
(Uzbekistan) Mokhira Abdullaeva	5
(Democratic Republic of the Congo) Lisa Kanjinga	0

Semi-finals
(Turkey) Şennur Demir	5
(Poland) Lidia Fidura	0
(Morocco) Khadija El-Mardi	RSC-I
(Uzbekistan) Mokhira Abdullaeva

Final
(Turkey) Şennur Demir	4
(Morocco) Khadija El-Mardi	1
