= Şennur Demir =

Turkish coach and retired boxer (born 1982)

Personal information
- Nationality: Turkish
- Born: 10 August 1982 (age 43) Bartın, Turkey
- Education: Bartın University
- Weight: Heavyweight 81kg

Boxing career

Boxing record
- Total fights: 24
- Wins: 15
- Win by KO: 1
- Losses: 9
- Draws: 0
- No contests: 0
Medal record
Women's amateur boxing
Representing Turkey
World Championships
Gold medal – first place	2022 Istanbul	Heavyweight
Silver medal – second place	2018 New Delhi	Heavyweight
Bronze medal – third place	2016 Astana	Heavyweight
European Championships
Bronze medal – third place	2022 Budva	Heavyweight
Bronze medal – third place	2018 Sofia	Heavyweight
Bronze medal – third place	2016 Sofia	Heavyweight
European Union Championships
Gold medal – first place	2017 Cascia	Heavyweight
Silver medal – second place	2011 Katowice	Heavyweight

Şennur Demir (born 10 August 1982) is aTurkish boxing coach and retired world champion female boxer competed in the heavyweight (+81 kg) division. She is from Bartın.

== Early years in martial arts ==
Demir started her sport career performing kickboxing at the age of 25. She became Turkish kickboxing champion, then runner-up in the Full contact karate World championships. A second place in an international boxing tournament and champion titles in the Turkish Boxing Championships followed.

== Boxing career ==
Her boxing career became solid when she transferred to Fenerbahçe Boxing in Istanbul.

As well as a kickboxer, she turned pro in 2011 after she won the golden belt national title in K-1.

She won the silver medal at the 2011 Women's European Union Championships held in Katowice, Poland, and the gold medal at the 2017 Women's European Union Championships in Cascia, Italy.

She became bronze medalist at the European Amateur Boxing Championships in 2016, and 2018 in Sofia, Bulgaria, and 2022 in Budva, Montebegro.

She took the bronze medal at the 2016 AIBA Women's World Championships in Astana, Kazakhstan, and the silver medal at the 2018 AIBA Women's World Championships in New Delhi, India.

At the 2022 IBA Women's World Championships in Istanbul, Turkey, Demir defeated Khadija El-Mardi from Morocco in the heavyweigt (+81 kg) division final, and became world champion.

== Coaching career ==
After her retirement from active boxing, Demir started performing sport coaching. In 2023, she was appointed coach of the women's national team. At the 2023 European Games in Nowy Targ, Poland, she participated as the coach.

== Personal life ==
Şennur Demir was born in a village of Amasra district in Bartın Province. After completing her primary and middle school in her hometown, she studied at Trade Vocational High School in Bartın. She then moved to Istanbul to work in sock manufacturing workshops. Returning home, she started working as a private security guard at a student dormitory in 2005. At age 28, Demir began studying Physical Education at Bartın University. After four years of undergraduate education, she earned a master's degree. She works as a teacher of physical education at Ülkü Ahmet Durusoy Middle School in Ankara.
