= Boxing at the 2014 Summer Youth Olympics =

Boxing competitions

Boxing at the II Summer Youth Olympic Games
- Venue: Nanjing International Expo Center
- Dates: 23–27 August
- No. of events: 13 (10 boys, 3 girls)

Boxing at the 2014 Summer Youth Olympics was held from 23 to 27 August 2014 at the Nanjing International Expo Center in Nanjing, China. For the first time three female boxing events took place at the Youth Olympics.

== Qualification ==
Each National Olympic Committee (NOC) can enter a maximum of 5 competitors, 3 males and 2 females with a maximum of 1 competitor in each weight category. 62 places were decided at the 2014 AIBA Youth World Championships held in Sofia, Bulgaria from 14–24 April 2014. The top 5 male and top 4 female boxers of each weight category qualified to the Youth Olympics. As hosts, China was given two quotas, 1 per each gender to compete. Initially 14 quotas, 9 males and 5 females were given to the Tripartite Commission, however the spots were not allocated due to lack of technical abilities and safety concerns thus the quotas were reallocated based on the results from the 2014 AIBA Youth World Championships.

To be eligible to participate at the Youth Olympics athletes must have been born between 1 January 1996 and 31 December 1997. Furthermore, all athletes must have participated at the 2014 AIBA Youth World Championships.

NOC	Boys										Girls			Total
NOC	-49 kg	-52 kg	-56 kg	-60 kg	-64 kg	-69 kg	-75 kg	-81 kg	-91 kg	+91 kg	-51 kg	-60 kg	-75 kg	Total
Algeria			X											1
Argentina										X				1
Armenia								X			X			2
Australia							X						X	2
Azerbaijan	X	X								X				3
Belarus						X			X					2
Bulgaria		X	X					X						3
China		X									X			2
Croatia						X	X		X					3
Cuba			X	X					X					3
Dominican Republic						X								1
Finland							X							1
France													X	1
Georgia						X								1
Germany										X				1
Great Britain		X	X					X						3
Hungary				X	X					X				3
India	X	X												2
Ireland									X			X	X	3
Italy					X	X					X	X		4
Japan	X			X	X									3
Kazakhstan	X			X				X			X			4
South Korea									X					1
Mexico				X										1
Norway								X						1
Poland													X	1
Romania				X										1
Russia					X		X			X				3
Slovakia			X											1
Sweden												X		1
Chinese Taipei											X		X	2
Tunisia			X											1
Turkey	X				X			X			X	X		5
Ukraine					X		X		X			X		4
United States		X								X		X	X	4
Uzbekistan	X					X	X							3
36 NOCs	6	6	6	6	6	6	6	6	6	6	6	6	6	78

== Schedule ==
The schedule was released by the Nanjing Youth Olympic Games Organizing Committee. Three sessions will be held per day during the preliminary, semifinals and ranking rounds.

All times are CST (UTC+8)

Event date	Event day	Starting time	Event details
August 23	Saturday	14:00; 16:00; 19:00	Boys' Events: Preliminaries; Girls' Events: Preliminaries
August 24	Sunday	14:00; 16:00; 19:00	Boys' Events: Semifinals; Girls' Events: Semifinals
August 25	Monday	14:00; 16:00; 19:00	Boys' Events: Ranking Bouts; Girls' Events: Ranking Bouts
August 26	Tuesday	16:30	Girls' Events: Finals
August 27	Wednesday	14:00	Boys' Events: Finals

== Medal summary ==
=== Medal table ===
* Host nation (China)

Rank	Nation	Gold	Silver	Bronze	Total
1	Cuba (CUB)	2	1	0	3
1	United States (USA)	2	1	0	3
3	Italy (ITA)	1	1	1	3
4	Bulgaria (BUL)	1	1	0	2
4	China (CHN)*	1	1	0	2
4	Kazakhstan (KAZ)	1	1	0	2
4	Uzbekistan (UZB)	1	1	0	2
8	Azerbaijan (AZE)	1	0	0	1
8	Germany (GER)	1	0	0	1
8	Poland (POL)	1	0	0	1
8	Ukraine (UKR)	1	0	0	1
12	Croatia (CRO)	0	1	1	2
12	Ireland (IRL)	0	1	1	2
12	Japan (JPN)	0	1	1	2
12	Russia (RUS)	0	1	1	2
16	Chinese Taipei (TPE)	0	1	0	1
16	Dominican Republic (DOM)	0	1	0	1
18	Great Britain (GBR)	0	0	2	2
18	Turkey (TUR)	0	0	2	2
20	Armenia (ARM)	0	0	1	1
20	Australia (AUS)	0	0	1	1
20	Hungary (HUN)	0	0	1	1
20	Sweden (SWE)	0	0	1	1
Totals (23 entries)		13	13	13	39

=== Boys' events ===
Event	Gold	Silver	Bronze
−49 kg	Rufat Huseynov (AZE)	Sulaymon Latipov (UZB)	Subaru Murata (JPN)
−52 kg	Shakur Stevenson (USA)	Lyu Ping (CHN)	Muhammad Ali (GBR)
−56 kg	Javier Ibáñez (CUB)	Dushko Blagovestov (BUL)	Peter McGrail (GBR)
−60 kg	Ablaikhan Zhussupov (KAZ)	Alain Limonta (CUB)	Richárd Könnyű (HUN)
−64 kg	Vincenzo Arecchia (ITA)	Toshihiro Suzuki (JPN)	Adem Furkan Avcı (TUR)
−69 kg	Bektemir Melikuziev (UZB)	Juan Ramón Solano (DOM)	Vincenzo Lizzi (ITA)
−75 kg	Ramil Gadzhyiev (UKR)	Dmitriy Nesterov (RUS)	Luka Plantić (CRO)
−81 kg	Blagoy Naydenov (BUL)	Vadim Kazakov (KAZ)	Narek Manasyan (ARM)
−91 kg	Yordan Hernández (CUB)	Toni Filipi (CRO)	Michael Gallagher (IRL)
+91 kg	Peter Kadiru (GER)	Darmani Rock (USA)	Marat Kerimkhanov (RUS)

=== Girls' events ===
Event	Gold	Silver	Bronze
−51 kg	Chang Yuan (CHN)	Irma Testa (ITA)	Neriman Istık (TUR)
−60 kg	Jajaira Gonzalez (USA)	Ciara Ginty (IRL)	Agnes Alexiusson (SWE)
−75 kg	Elżbieta Wójcik (POL)	Chen Nien-chin (TPE)	Caitlin Parker (AUS)
