= Tammara Thibeault =

Canadian boxer (born 1996)

Tamm Thibeault
Personal information
- Born: Tammara Amanda Thibeault; December 27, 1996 (age 29) Saint-Georges, Quebec, Canada
- Height: 5 ft 10 in (178 cm)
- Weight: Middleweight

Boxing career
- Stance: Southpaw

Boxing record
- Total fights: 5
- Wins: 5
- Win by KO: 3
Medal record
Women's Amateur boxing
Representing Canada
World Championships
Gold medal – first place	2022 Istanbul	Middleweight
Bronze medal – third place	2019 Ulan-Ude	Middleweight
Commonwealth Games
Gold medal – first place	2022 Birmingham	Middleweight
Bronze medal – third place	2018 Gold Coast	Middleweight
Pan American Games
Gold medal – first place	2023 Santiago	Middleweight
Silver medal – second place	2019 Lima	Middleweight
Pan American Boxing Championships
Gold medal – first place	2026 Puebla	Middleweight
Gold medal – first place	2022 Guayaquil	Middleweight
Gold medal – first place	2017 Tegucigalpa	Middleweight

Tammara Thibeault (born December 27, 1996) is a Canadian professional boxer She has held the IBF and WBO female middleweight titles since August 2026. As an amateur, Thibeault won the 2022 IBA World Championship. She also won gold medals at the 2022 Commonwealth Games and 2023 Pan American Games.

== Amateur career ==
At her first senior event, Thibeault won the gold medal at the 2017 Pan American Championships which were held in Tegucigalpa, Honduras.

At the 2018 Commonwealth Games in Gold Coast, Australia, Thibeault won the bronze medal in the middleweight event.

At the 2019 Pan American Games, Thibeault originally won the bronze medal in the middleweight event, but was later upgraded to silver after the gold medalist was stripped of her medal due to doping.

Thibeault won a bronze medal at the 2019 AIBA Women's World Boxing Championships.

Thibeault qualified to represent Canada at the 2020 Summer Olympics. Ultimately, Thibeault would lose in the quarterfinals of the middleweight event, one win away from a guaranteed medal.

In April 2022, Thibeault won the gold medal at the 2022 Pan American Championships which were held in Guayquil, Ecuador, which represented her second gold medal win at the tournament. Thiebeault defeated Panama's Atheyna Bylon in a unanimous decision to win gold. The following month, at the 2022 IBA Women's World Boxing Championships, Thibeault would go on to win the gold medal in the middleweight event, by beating Panama's Atheyna Bylon again in a 4−1 decision.

== Professional career ==
Signed to Jake Paul's Most Valuable Promotions, Thibeault made her professional boxing debut at Caribe Royale in Orlando, Florida, U.S. on 13 December 2024, defeating Natasha Spence by unanimous decision over four rounds.

In her second bout in the paid ranks, she stopped Sonya Dreiling in the first of their scheduled six-round fight at Toronto Casino Resort on 7 March 2025.

Thibeault stopped Mary Casamassa in the fifth round at Madison Square Garden, New York City, New York on 11 July 2025.

Thibeault defeated Cristina Mazzotta by technical knockout after just 56 seconds of the first round at Théâtre Saint-Denis in Montreal on 27 September 2025.

Thibeault was scheduled to face fellow unbeaten boxer Nadja Jesus Santos in her first 10 round contest at The Theater at Madison Square Garden in New York City, U.S. on 17 April 2026. On 13 April 2026, it was announced that the fight was cancelled due to a visa issue for Santos.

She challenged IBF and WBO female middleweight champion Desley Robinson at Caribe Royale in Orlando, Florida, U.S. on 8 August 2026. Thibeault won via unanimous decision. She became the fastest fighter to win a Ring magazine world championship, doing so in five professional fights, surpassing the previous record of seven fights held by Lauren Price.

== Personal life ==
Thibeault started boxing at the age of 10 and has a bachelor's degrees in linguistics and two minors in Mandarin and Spanish. Thibeault plans to open an international corporation after her retirement from the sport of boxing.

Thibeault is of Haitian and French Canadian descent.

== Professional boxing record ==
5 fights	5 wins	0 losses
By knockout	3	0
By decision	2	0

No.	Result	Record	Opponent	Type	Round, time	Date	Location	Notes
5	Win	5–0	Desley Robinson	UD	10	Aug 8, 2026	Caribe Royale Orlando, Orlando, Florida, U.S.	Won IBF and WBO middleweight titles
4	Win	4–0	Cristina Mazzotta	TKO	1 (6) 0:56	Sep 27, 2025	Théâtre Saint-Denis, Montreal, Quebec, Canada	
3	Win	3–0	Mary Casamassa	TKO	5 (8) 2:18	Jul 11, 2025	Madison Square Garden, New York City, New York, U.S.	
2	Win	2–0	Sonya Dreiling	TKO	1 (6) 3:00	Mar 7, 2025	Toronto Casino Resort, Toronto, Canada	
1	Win	1–0	Natasha Spence	UD	4	Dec 13, 2024	Caribe Royale Orlando, Orlando, Florida, U.S.	

== See also ==
- List of female boxers
- List of southpaw stance boxers

Sporting positions
World boxing titles
Preceded by Desley Robinson	IBF middleweight champion August 8, 2026 – present	Incumbent
Preceded by Desley Robinson	WBO middleweight champion August 8, 2026 – present	Incumbent
Vacant Title last held by Claressa Shields	The Ring middleweight champion August 8, 2026 – present	Incumbent
