= Darmani Rock =

American boxer

Personal information
- Born: April 17, 1996 (age 30) Philadelphia, Pennsylvania, U.S.
- Height: 6 ft 5 in (196 cm)
- Weight: Heavyweight

Boxing career
- Stance: Orthodox

Boxing record
- Total fights: 18
- Wins: 17
- Win by KO: 12
- Losses: 1
Medal record
Men's amateur boxing
Representing United States
Youth Olympic Games
| Silver medal – second place | 2014 Nanjing | Super heavyweight |
AIBA Youth World Boxing Championships
| Gold medal – first place | 2014 Sofia | Super heavyweight |

Darmani Rock (born April 17, 1996) is an American professional boxer. As an amateur he won a gold medal at the 2014 Youth World Championships and silver at the 2014 Youth Olympics.

== Professional career ==
Rock made his professional debut on May 13, 2016, scoring a first-round technical knockout (TKO) victory over Carlos Black at the D.C. Armory in Washington, D.C.

== Professional boxing record ==
| 18 fights | 17 wins | 1 loss |
|---|---|---|
| By knockout | 12 | 1 |
| By decision | 5 | 0 |

| No. | Result | Record | Opponent | Type | Round, time | Date | Location | Notes |
|---|---|---|---|---|---|---|---|---|
| 18 | Loss | 17–1 | Michael Polite Coffie | KO | 3 (10), 0:59 | Jan 30, 2021 | Shrine Exposition Center. Los Angeles, California, U.S. | |
| 17 | Win | 17–0 | Maurenzo Smith | RTD | 2 (8), 3:00 | Oct 19, 2019 | The Met, Philadelphia, Pennsylvania, U.S. | |
| 16 | Win | 16–0 | Raymond Ochieng | KO | 2 (6), 2:15 | Jun 14, 2019 | Maxwell Snyder Armory, Jacksonville, Florida, U.S. | |
| 15 | Win | 15–0 | Mike Bisset | TKO | 2 (6), 2:20 | Apr 26, 2019 | The Met, Philadelphia, Pennsylvania, U.S. | |
| 14 | Win | 14–0 | Steven Lyons | KO | 4 (6), 1:20 | Feb 8, 2019 | 2300 Arena, Philadelphia, Pennsylvania, U.S. | |
| 13 | Win | 13–0 | Pedro Julio Rodriguez | TKO | 4 (8), 0:27 | Oct 6, 2018 | 2300 Arena, Philadelphia, Pennsylvania, U.S. | |
| 12 | Win | 12–0 | Marquis Valentine | UD | 6 | Jul 20, 2018 | WinnaVegas Casino Resort, Sloan, Iowa, U.S. | |
| 11 | Win | 11–0 | Deon Hale | KO | 2 (6), 1:07 | Mar 30, 2018 | The Fillmore, Philadelphia, Pennsylvania, U.S. | |
| 10 | Win | 10–0 | Carlos Cotto | TKO | 1 (6), 2:59 | Dec 1, 2017 | SugarHouse Casino, Philadelphia, Pennsylvania, U.S. | |
| 9 | Win | 9–0 | Juan Goode | UD | 6 | Oct 19, 2017 | Durham Armory, Durham, North Carolina, U.S. | |
| 8 | Win | 8–0 | Jon Bolden | UD | 6 | Mar 18, 2017 | Mountaineer Casino Ballroom, New Cumberland, West Virginia, U.S. | |
| 7 | Win | 7–0 | Solomon Maye | KO | 5 (6), 0:34 | Jan 20, 2017 | Bally's, Atlantic City, New Jersey, U.S. | |
| 6 | Win | 6–0 | Brice Ritani Coe | UD | 4 | Nov 19, 2016 | T-Mobile Arena, Las Vegas, Nevada, U.S. | |
| 5 | Win | 5–0 | John Orr | TKO | 3 (4), 2:03 | Oct 22, 2016 | Body Renew Fitness, Winchester, Virginia, U.S. | |
| 4 | Win | 4–0 | Mike Kyle | UD | 4 | Aug 6, 2016 | Oracle Arena, Oakland, California, U.S. | |
| 3 | Win | 3–0 | Hassan Lee | TKO | 1 (4), 2:21 | Jul 15, 2016 | Rivers Casino, Pittsburgh, Pennsylvania, U.S. | |
| 2 | Win | 2–0 | Bobby Favors | TKO | 1 (4), 1:46 | Jun 11, 2016 | Marina Bay SportsPlex, Quincy, Massachusetts, U.S. | |
| 1 | Win | 1–0 | Carlos Black | TKO | 1 (4), 1:54 | May 3, 2016 | D.C. Armory, Washington, D.C., U.S. | |
