= Mary Spencer =

Canadian boxer (born 1984)

Personal information
- Born: Mary Elizabeth Spencer; December 12, 1984 (age 41) Wiarton, Ontario, Canada
- Height: 5 ft 11 in (180 cm)
- Weight: Light middleweight

Boxing career
- Stance: Orthodox

Boxing record
- Total fights: 14
- Wins: 10
- Win by KO: 6
- Losses: 4
Medal record
Women's Amateur boxing
Representing Canada
World Championships
Gold medal – first place	2005 Podolsk	Welterweight
Gold medal – first place	2008 Ningbo	Welterweight
Gold medal – first place	2010 Barbados	Middleweight
Bronze medal – third place	2006 New Delhi	Welterweight
Pan American Games
Gold medal – first place	2011 Guadalajara	Light heavyweight

Mary Spencer (born December 12, 1984) is a Canadian professional boxer who is a former WBA female super-welterweight champion. As an amateur she won three World Championships and a Pan American Games gold medal.

== Amateur career ==
Spencer competed in multiple sports as a child including basketball, volleyball, soccer and track and field. She began serious boxing training in 2002, eventually linking up with coach Charlie Stewart at the Windsor Amateur Boxing Club.

Spencer won three World Championships taking the 66 kg title in 2005 and 2008 then the 75 kg crown in 2010. She also won a gold medal at the 2011 Pan-American Games in Mexico defeating Yenebier Guillen of the Dominican Republic in the 75 kg final.

Considered a medal favourite at the London 2012 Summer Olympics, which were the first Games to include women's boxing, Spencer received a bye into the quarter-finals where she lost to China's Li Jinzi who she had beaten in the world championship final two years earlier.

== Professional career ==
Having turned professional after the Olympics, Spencer was undefeated in her first six pro-fights and in her seventh contest won the WBA female International and WBC female Silver super-welterweight titles with a first-round stoppage success over the previously unbeaten Mexican boxer Cynthia Lozano in Montreal, Canada, on 9 September 2022.

Next she took on Belgian boxer Femke Hermans for the vacant IBO female super-welterweight World title losing the bout in Shawnigan, Quebec, Canada, on 16 December 2022 by unanimous decision.

A rematch was held on 11 October 2023, in Montreal, Canada, with the IBO belt and the vacant IBF female super-welterweight title up for grabs. Once again Hermans got the victory, this time by majority decision.

Spencer snapped her losing streak with a win over Sonya Dreiling on 25 January 2024, taking victory via retirement when her American opponent failed to answer the bell at the start of round two.

=== WBA Super-Welterweight champion ===
==== Spencer vs. Mannes ====
On 5 September 2024 at Montreal Casino, Quebec, Canada, Spencer defeated Naomi Mannes by unanimous decision to win the interim WBA super-welterweight title.

==== Spencer vs. Suárez ====
Spencer was elevated to a full champion after Terri Harper vacated the title. She made her first defense against Ogleidis Suárez back at Montreal Casino on 10 April 2025, winning by unanimous decision.

=== Unified Super-Welterweight Championship ===
==== Spencer vs. Mayer ====
Spencer defended her WBA title against Mikaela Mayer at Montreal Casino on 30 October 2025. The vacant WBC and WBO female super-welterweight championships were also on the line. Spencer lost by unanimous decision.

=== Unified Middleweight Championship ===
==== Spencer vs. Robinson ====
Spencer challenged Desley Robinson for her unified IBF and WBO middleweight titles at County Coliseum in El Paso, Texas, U.S. on May 30, 2026. She lost by unanimous decision.

== Personal life ==
Spencer was born in Wiarton, Ontario, Canada, and is a member of the Chippewas of Nawash Unceded First Nation formerly known as the Cape Croker First Nation. She was an Indspire Award recipient in the sports category in 2014 and was awarded the 2019 Randy Starkman Award by the Canadian Olympic Committee. In January 2024, Spencer joined the Boxing Ontario board of directors.

== Professional boxing record ==
14 fights	10 wins	4 losses
By knockout	6	0
By decision	4	4

No.	Result	Record	Opponent	Type	Round, time	Date	Location	Notes
14	Loss	10–4	Desley Robinson	UD	10	May 30, 2026	County Coliseum, El Paso, Texas, U.S	For IBF and WBO female middleweight titles
13	Loss	10-3	Mikaela Mayer	UD	10	Oct 30, 2025	Montreal Casino, Montreal, Canada	Lost WBA female super welterweight title; for vacant WBC and WBO female super-welterweight titles
12	Win	10–2	Ogleidis Suárez	UD	10	Apr 10, 2025	Montreal Casino, Montreal, Canada	Retained WBA light-middleweight title
11	Win	9–2	Naomi Mannes	UD	10	Sep 5, 2024	Montreal Casino, Montreal, Canada	Won Interim title WBA light-middleweight title
10	Win	8–2	Sonya Dreiling	RTD	1 (8), 2:00	Jan 25, 2024	Montreal Casino, Montreal, Canada	
9	Loss	7–2	Femke Hermans	MD	10	11 Oct 2023	Montreal Casino, Montreal, Canada	For IBO and vacant IBF light-middleweight titles
8	Loss	7–1	Femke Hermans	UD	10	Dec 16, 2022	Centre Gervais Auto, Shawinigan, Canada	For vacant IBO light-middleweight title
7	Win	7–0	Cynthia Lozano	TKO	1 (10), 1:03	Sep 9, 2022	Montreal Casino, Montreal, Canada	Won vacant WBA International and WBC Silver light-middleweight titles
6	Win	6–0	Chris Namús	TKO	1 (8), 1:56	Jun 23, 2022	Montreal Casino, Montreal, Canada	
5	Win	5–0	Yamila Esther Reynoso	UD	8	May 28, 2022	CAA Centre, Brampton, Canada	
4	Win	4–0	Beatriz Aguilar	KO	1 (6), 0:23	Mar 26, 2022	Montreal Casino, Montreal, Canada	
3	Win	3–0	Milagros Diaz Perez	UD	4	Jan 29, 2022	Big Punch Arena, Tijuana, Mexico	
2	Win	2–0	Luz Mondaca	TKO	1 (4), 1:46	Oct 29, 2021	Auditorio Centenario, Torreón, Mexico	
1	Win	1–0	Maria Esquivel Zamora	KO	1 (4), 0:29	Aug 27, 2021	Hotel Holiday Inn, Cuernavaca, Mexico	

== See also ==
- List of female boxers

Sporting positions
Regional boxing titles
New title	WBA International light-middleweight champion September 9, 2022 – November 2024; Vacated	Vacant
Vacant Title last held by Inna Sagaydakovskaya	WBC Silver light-middleweight champion September 9, 2022 – September 5, 2024; Won interim title	Vacant Title next held by Priscilla Peterle
World boxing titles
New title	WBA light-middleweight champion Interim title September 5, 2024 – September 2024; Promoted	Vacant
Preceded by Terri Harper; Vacated	WBA light-middleweight champion September 2024 – October 30, 2025	Succeeded by Mikaela Mayer
