= Nouchka Fontijn =

Dutch boxer (born 1987)

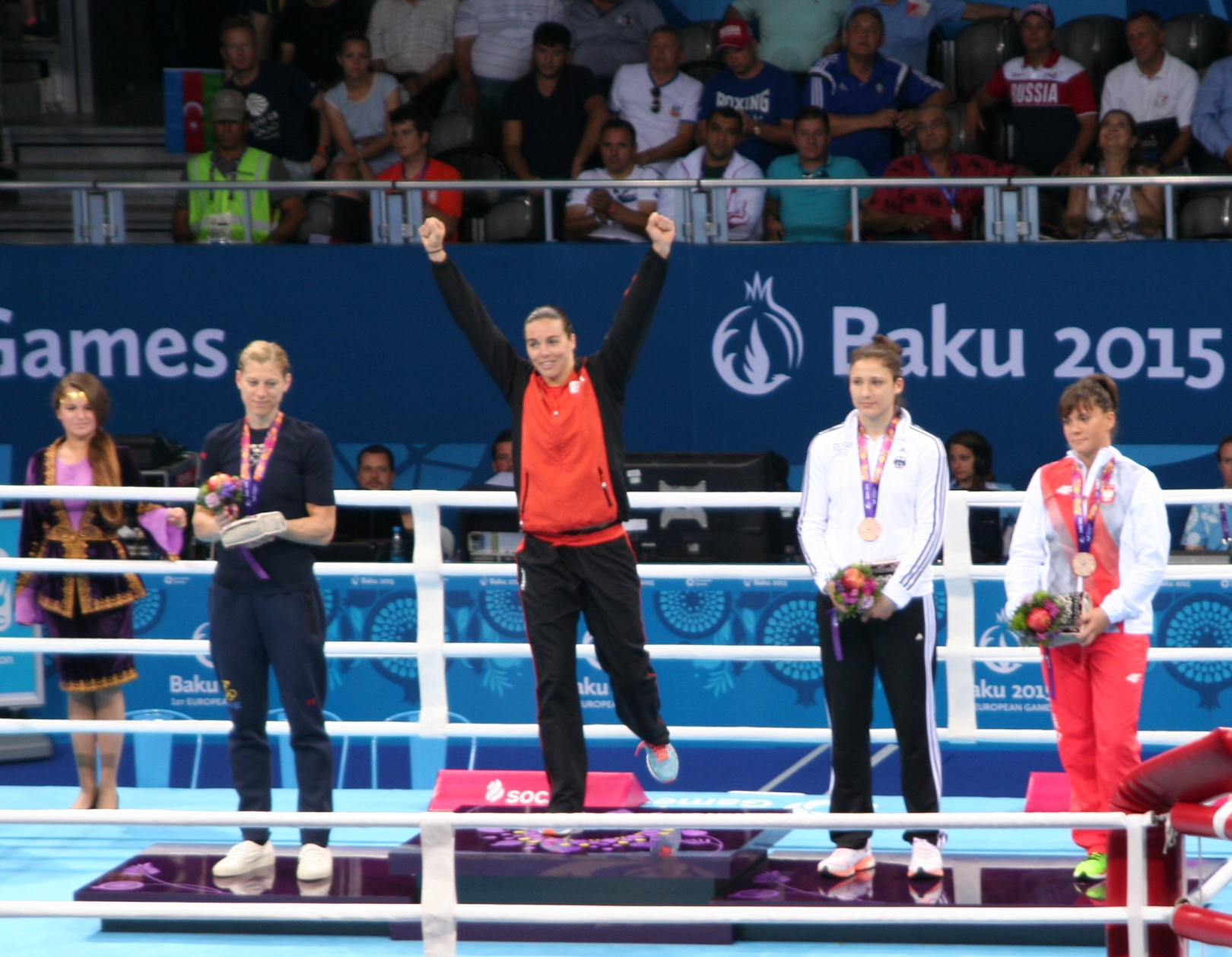
- Fontijn (center) at the 2015 European Games

Personal information
- Born: 9 November 1987 (age 38) Rotterdam, Netherlands
- Height: 1.80 m (5 ft 11 in)
- Weight: 75 kg (165 lb)
- Website: www.nouchkafontijn.nl

Boxing career
- Weight class: Middleweight

Boxing record
- Total fights: 121
- Wins: 102
- Win by KO: 5
- Losses: 19
- Draws: 0
- No contests: 0
Medal record
Women's boxing
Representing the Netherlands
Olympic Games
Silver medal – second place	2016 Rio de Janeiro	Middleweight
Bronze medal – third place	2020 Tokyo	Middleweight
World Championships
Silver medal – second place	2016 Astana	Middleweight
Silver medal – second place	2018 New Delhi	Middleweight
Silver medal – second place	2019 Ulan-Ude	Middleweight
Bronze medal – third place	2014 Jeju City	Middleweight
European Games
Gold medal – first place	2015 Baku	Middleweight
Silver medal – second place	2019 Minsk	Middleweight
European Championships
Gold medal – first place	2014 Bucharest	Middleweight
Gold medal – first place	2018 Sofia	Middleweight
Silver medal – second place	2011 Rotterdam	Middleweight
European Union Championships
Gold medal – first place	2017 Cascia	Middleweight
Silver medal – second place	2011 Katowice	Middleweight
Silver medal – second place	2013 Keszthely	Middleweight

Nouchka Fontijn (Dutch pronunciation: [ˈnuɕkaː fɔnˈtɛin]; born 9 November 1987) is a retired Dutch boxer. She was the European champion in the women's middleweight or 75 kg class after winning gold at both the European Championships in 2014 and the European Games in 2015.

== Early life and education ==
Nouchka Fontijn was born on 9 November 1987 in Rotterdam in the Netherlands. She studied physiotherapy at the Rotterdam University of Applied Sciences.

== Boxing career ==
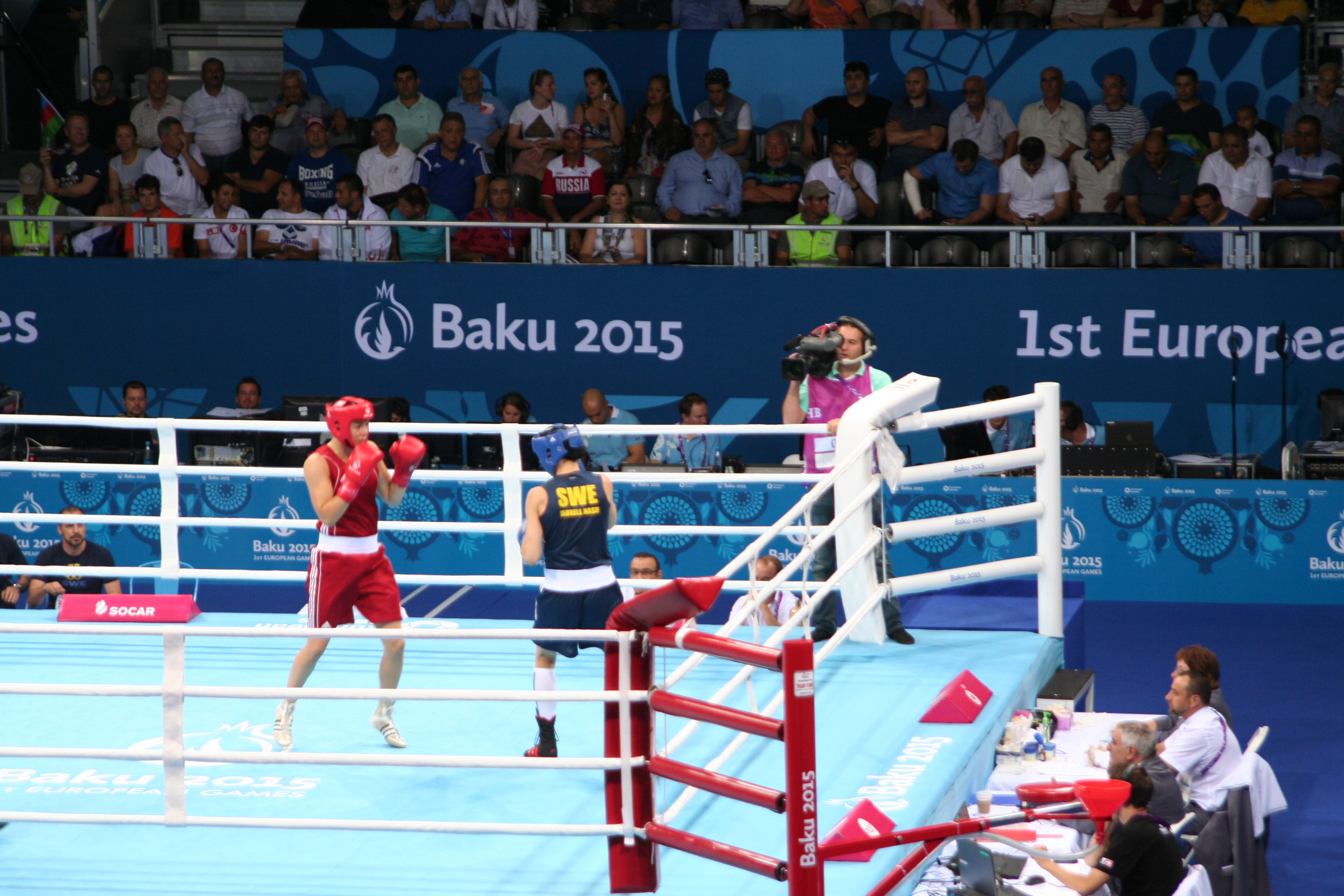
Fontijn (left) fighting Anna Laurell Nash in the 2015 European Games final

Fontijn started amateur boxing in 2007 and has been competing in the middleweight or 75 kg class. She first became Dutch champion in 2009 and has prolonged her title every year since.

She won silver at the 2011 European Championships in Rotterdam, after losing in the final from Nadezhda Torlopova. She won gold at the 2014 European Championships in Bucharest. The next year, she also won gold at the 2015 European Games in Baku.

She won silver at the 2016 World Championships in Astana and again silver at the 2016 Summer Olympics in Rio de Janeiro, both times after losing 3–0 to Claressa Shields in the final.

Fontijn also competed at the 2020 Summer Olympics in Tokyo where she won the bronze medal.
