= Davina Michel =

French boxer (born 1997)

Personal information
- Nationality: France
- Born: 27 December 1997 (age 28)

Boxing career
Medal record
Boxing
Representing France
World Championships
Bronze medal – third place	2022 Istanbul	Middleweight
European Games
Silver medal – second place	2023 Kraków-Małopolska	Middleweight

Davina Michel (born 27 December 1997) is a French boxer. She competed at the 2014 Summer Youth Olympics in the boxing competition, winning no medal. She also competed at the 2022 IBA Women's World Boxing Championships, winning the bronze medal in the middleweight event.
