= Khadija El-Mardi =

Moroccan boxer (born 1991)

Khadija El Mardi
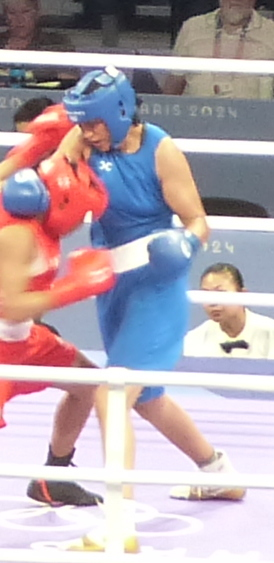
- Mardi in 2024

Personal information
- Nationality: Moroccan
- Born: Khadija Mardi; 1 February 1991 (age 35) Casablanca, Morocco
- Height: 183 cm (6 ft 0 in)
- Weight: 75 kg (165 lb)

Boxing career
- Weight class: Middleweight
Medal record
Women's amateur boxing
Representing Morocco
World Championships
Gold medal – first place	2023 New Delhi	Heavyweight
Silver medal – second place	2022 Istanbul	Heavyweight
Bronze medal – third place	2019 Ulan-Ude	Middleweight
African Games
Gold medal – first place	2019 Rabat	Middleweight
Gold medal – first place	2023 Accra	Heavyweight
African Championships
Gold medal – first place	2022 Maputo	Heavyweight
Gold medal – first place	2023 Yaoundé	Heavyweight
Gold medal – first place	2024 Kinshasa	Heavyweight

Khadija Mardi (born 1 February 1991), also known as Khadija El Mardi, is a Moroccan boxer. She is the current Heavyweight women's IBA World Boxing Champion.

== Career ==
Mardi competed in the women's middleweight event at the 2016 Summer Olympics. She lost to Dariga Shakimova in the quarter-finals.

She qualified to represent Morocco at the 2020 Summer Olympics, however, she withdrew from the competition for medical reasons.

In 2022, Mardi won the gold medal at the 2022 African Amateur Boxing Championships. She won silver medal at the 2022 IBA Women's World Boxing Championships, after losing the final match against Şennur Demir.

In March 2023, Mardi won a gold medal in the 2023 IBA Women's World Boxing Championships, thus winning her and Morocco's first women's gold medal in the IBA World Boxing Championships. King Mohammed VI congratulated her on her victory.

She won the gold medal in the women's +81 kg event at the 2023 African Games held in Accra, Ghana.
