= Natasha Gale =

English boxer (born 1988)

Personal information
- Nationality: English
- Born: 13 May 1988 (age 38) Leeds, England
- Height: 5 ft 11 1/2 in (182 cm)
- Weight: Middleweight

Boxing career
Medal record
Women's amateur boxing
Representing England
European Championships
Gold medal – first place	2016 Sofia	Middleweight
EU Championships
Bronze medal – third place	2017 Cascia	Middleweight
Strandja Cup
Silver medal – second place	2018 Sofia	Middleweight
Bronze medal – third place	2017 Sofia	Middleweight
ABA Championships
Gold medal – first place	2017 Rotherham	Middleweight
Gold medal – first place	2016 Liverpool	Middleweight
Gold medal – first place	2015 Liverpool	Middleweight

Natasha Gale (born 13 May 1988) is a retired English amateur boxer.

On her senior championship debut in 2016, she became the second British woman (after double Olympic champion Nicola Adams) to win a European boxing title.
