= Érika Pachito =

Ecuadorian boxer (born 1995)

Personal information
- Born: 29 July 1995 (age 30)

Sport
- Sport: Boxing
Medal record
Representing Ecuador
Pan American Games
Bronze medal – third place	2019 Lima	Middleweight

Erika Stefania Pachito Jurado (born 29 July 1995) is an Ecuadorian boxer. In June 2021, she qualified to compete at the 2020 Summer Olympics in Tokyo, Japan, where she competed in the middleweight category.

Pachito started boxing when she was 18. In 2019, she won a bronze medal at the Pan American Games in Lima.
