= Aynur Rzayeva =

Azerbaijani boxer

Personal information
- Born: September 13, 1989 (age 35); Baku, Azerbaijan
- Height: 178 cm (5 ft 10 in)
- Weight: 81 kg (179 lb)

Sport
- Sport: boxer

Aynur Rzayeva is an Azerbaijani boxer and a member of the Azerbaijani national boxing team.

== Biography ==
Aynur Rzayeva was born on September 13, 1989, in Baku.

At the 2016 European Women's Boxing Championships in Sofia, she won a bronze medal in the over 81 kg category.

In 2022, Rzayeva took part in the European Boxing Championship held in Montenegro. She reached the final, where she lost to her opponent from Ukraine, ultimately taking the silver medal.

In March 2023, she became the bronze medalist at the Women's World Championship in New Delhi in the weight category over 81 kg, where she lost in the semifinals on points (0:5) to the representative of Kazakhstan, Lyazzat Kungebayeva. Thanks to this bronze, Rzayeva entered the history of Azerbaijani boxing as the first domestic athlete to win a medal at the World Championship.
