= Caitlin Parker =

Australian boxer (born 1996)

Caitlin Parker OLY
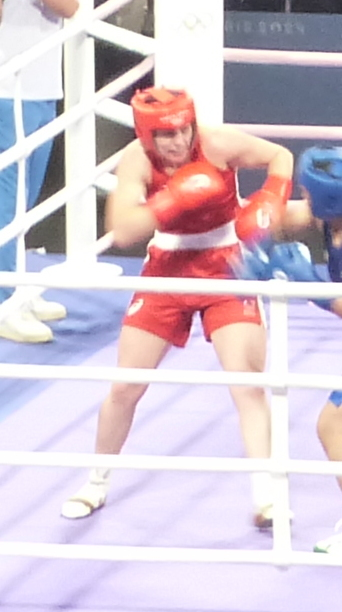
- Parker in 2024

Personal information
- Other names: Caity
- Born: Caitlin Anne Parker; 17 April 1996 (age 30) Subiaco, Perth, Western Australia
- Height: 175 cm (5 ft 9 in)

Boxing career
- Weight class: Middleweight
- Stance: Orthodox
Medal record
Women's amateur boxing
Representing Australia
Olympic Games
Bronze medal – third place	2024 Paris	Middleweight
World Championships
Silver medal – second place	2023 New Delhi	Middleweight
Commonwealth Games
Silver medal – second place	2018 Gold Coast	Middleweight
Bronze medal – third place	2022 Birmingham	Middleweight
Pacific Games
Gold medal – first place	2023 Honiara	Middleweight
Youth Olympics
Bronze medal – third place	2014 Nanjing	Middleweight

Caitlin Anne Parker OLY (born 17 April 1996) is an Australian amateur boxer, who became the first female boxer from Australia to win an Olympic medal when she took bronze at the 2024 Paris Games. Parker has also won silver and bronze medals at two Commonwealth Games and bronze at the 2014 Youth Olympics.

== Early life ==
Parker was born on 17 April 1996 in Subiaco, Perth, Western Australia. She began training in taekwondo and boxing at the age of 11 after her father refused to let her walk to school alone without learning self defence.

== Career ==
Parker competed at the 2014 Youth Olympics where she won a bronze medal in the 75 kg event.

She competed in the Commonwealth Games in 2018, where she won a silver medal in the middleweight event, and in 2022 where she won a bronze medal in the middleweight event.

She competed in the 2020 Asia & Oceania Boxing Olympic Qualification Tournament in March 2020 where she qualified for the 2020 Summer Olympics. At the Olympics, she lost to Atheyna Bylon in the round of 16.

Parker became the first Australian female boxer to win an Olympic medal when she won bronze at the 2024 Paris Olympics.
