= Atheyna Bylon =

Panamanian boxer (born 1989)

Atheyna Bylon OLY
Personal information
- Born: April 6, 1989 (age 37) Panama City, Panama

Sport
- Sport: Boxing
- Weight class: Welterweight, Middleweight
Medal record
Women's amateur boxing
Representing Panama
Olympic Games
Silver medal – second place	2024 Paris	Middleweight
World Championships
Gold medal – first place	2014 Jeju	Welterweight
Silver medal – second place	2022 Istanbul	Middleweight
Pan American Games
Silver medal – second place	2023 Santiago	Middleweight
South American Games
Gold medal – first place	2018 Cochabamba	Middleweight
Gold medal – first place	2022 Asunción	Middleweight
Silver medal – second place	2014 Santiago	Middleweight

Atheyna Bylon (born April 6, 1989) is a Panamanian boxer. She is a police officer. She started boxing when she was 19, and competed at the 2016 Summer Olympics in the women's middleweight event, in which she was eliminated in a round of 16 bout against Brazil's Andreia Bandeira. At the 2024 Summer Olympics in Paris she made history when she defeated Elżbieta Wójcik of Poland to advance to the semi-finals, assuring Panama of its 4th Olympic medal in history, the first for a female athlete and the first medal outside of athletics. She would go on to advance to the gold medal match, where she lost to Li Qian of China, earning the silver medal.

Olympic Games
Preceded by Alonso Edward	Flagbearer for Panama (with Alonso Edward); Tokyo 2020	Succeeded by Franklin Archibold; Hillary Heron
