= Naomi Graham =

American boxer

Naomi Graham OLY
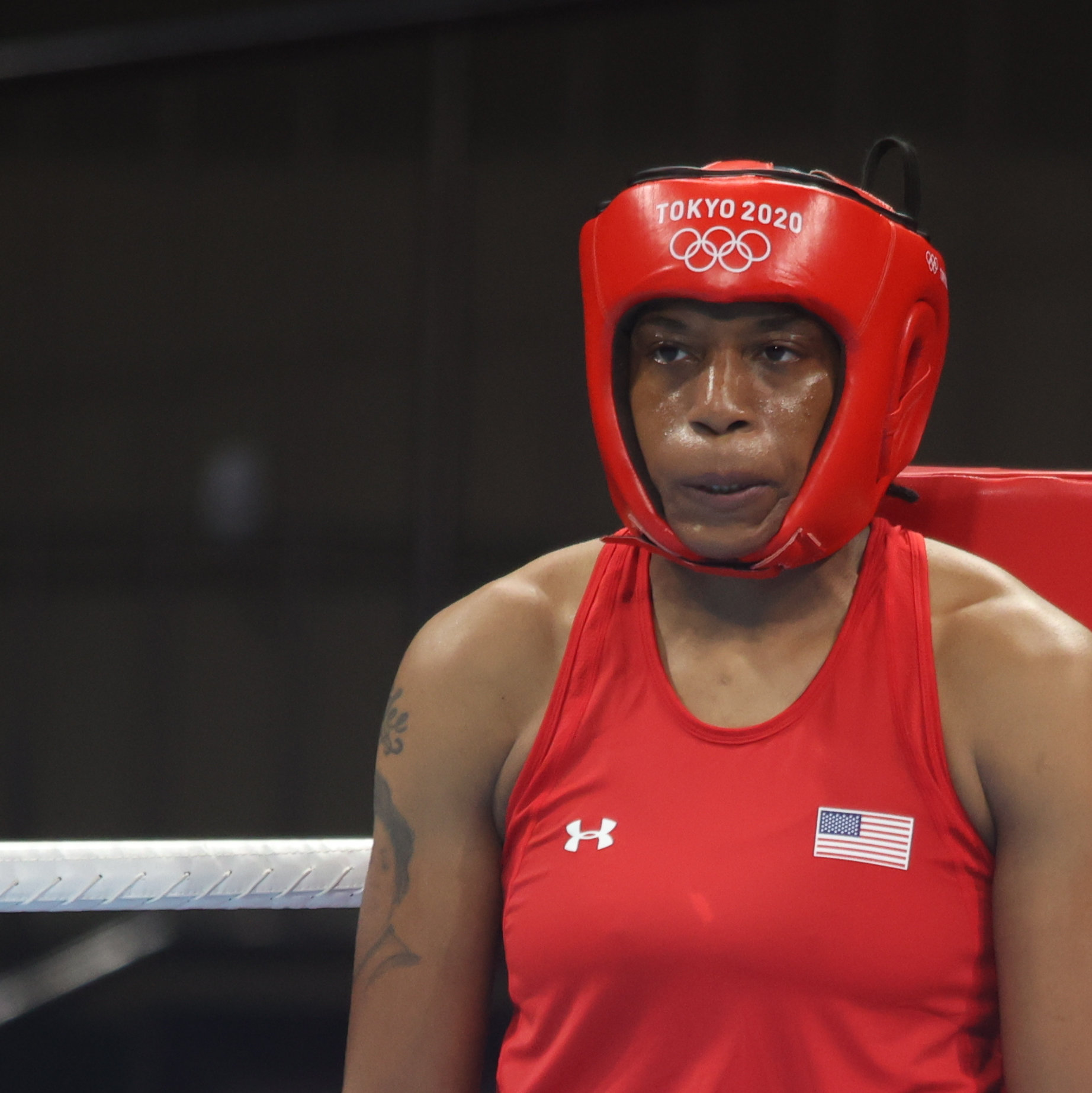
- Naomi Graham at the 2020 Olympics

Personal information
- National team: USA Boxing
- Born: May 15, 1989 (age 37) Fayetteville, North Carolina, U.S.
- Education: Pine Forest High School (NC)

Sport
- Sport: Boxing
- Weight class: Middleweight
- Club: U.S. Army WCAP
- Military career
- Allegiance: United States
- Branch: United States Army
- Service years: 2013–present
- Rank: Sergeant first class
Medal record
Women's amateur boxing
Representing the United States
World Championships
Bronze medal – third place	2018 New Delhi	Middleweight
Pan American Games
Gold medal – first place	2019 Lima	Middleweight

Naomi Melissa Graham OLY (born May 15, 1989) is an American middleweight boxer. She is a staff sergeant and ammunition specialist in the United States Army. Graham is the first female active duty service member to fight for the U.S. at the Olympics.

== Early life ==
Graham was brought up in Fayetteville, North Carolina where she was the youngest of six children. A sister, Rachel, who was six years older than her took up professional boxing, but Naomi did not, as her mother objected. When she was 21, she was made homeless by her mother. In 2012, she was inspired by seeing women like Nicola Adams competing in the 2012 Summer Olympics. She joined the army in 2013 and two years later she joined the Army's World Class Athlete Program.

== Amateur career ==
In 2019, Graham won silver at the Pan American Games, which was later upgraded to gold due to her opponent's in the final disqualification for doping. Graham became the first female active duty service member to compete for the U.S. at the Olympics. She was in Tokyo for the postponed 2020 Summer Olympics in 2021.
