= Elżbieta Wójcik =

Polish boxer (born 1996)

Personal information
- Nationality: Polish
- Born: 19 April 1996 (age 30)

Sport
- Sport: Boxing
Medal record
Women's amateur boxing
Representing Poland
European Games
Bronze medal – third place	2019 Minsk	Middleweight
Bronze medal – third place	2023 Kraków–Małopolska	Middleweight
EUBC European Championships
Silver medal – second place	2019 Alcobendas	Middleweight
Silver medal – second place	2022 Budva	Middleweight
EB European Championships
Bronze medal – third place	2026 Sofia	+80 kg
Youth Olympic Games
Gold medal – first place	2014 Nanjing	Middleweight

Elżbieta Wójcik (born 14 January 1996) is a Polish boxer. She competed in the women's middleweight event at the 2020 Summer Olympics.
