= Women's boxing =

Women's fighting sport

Boxing
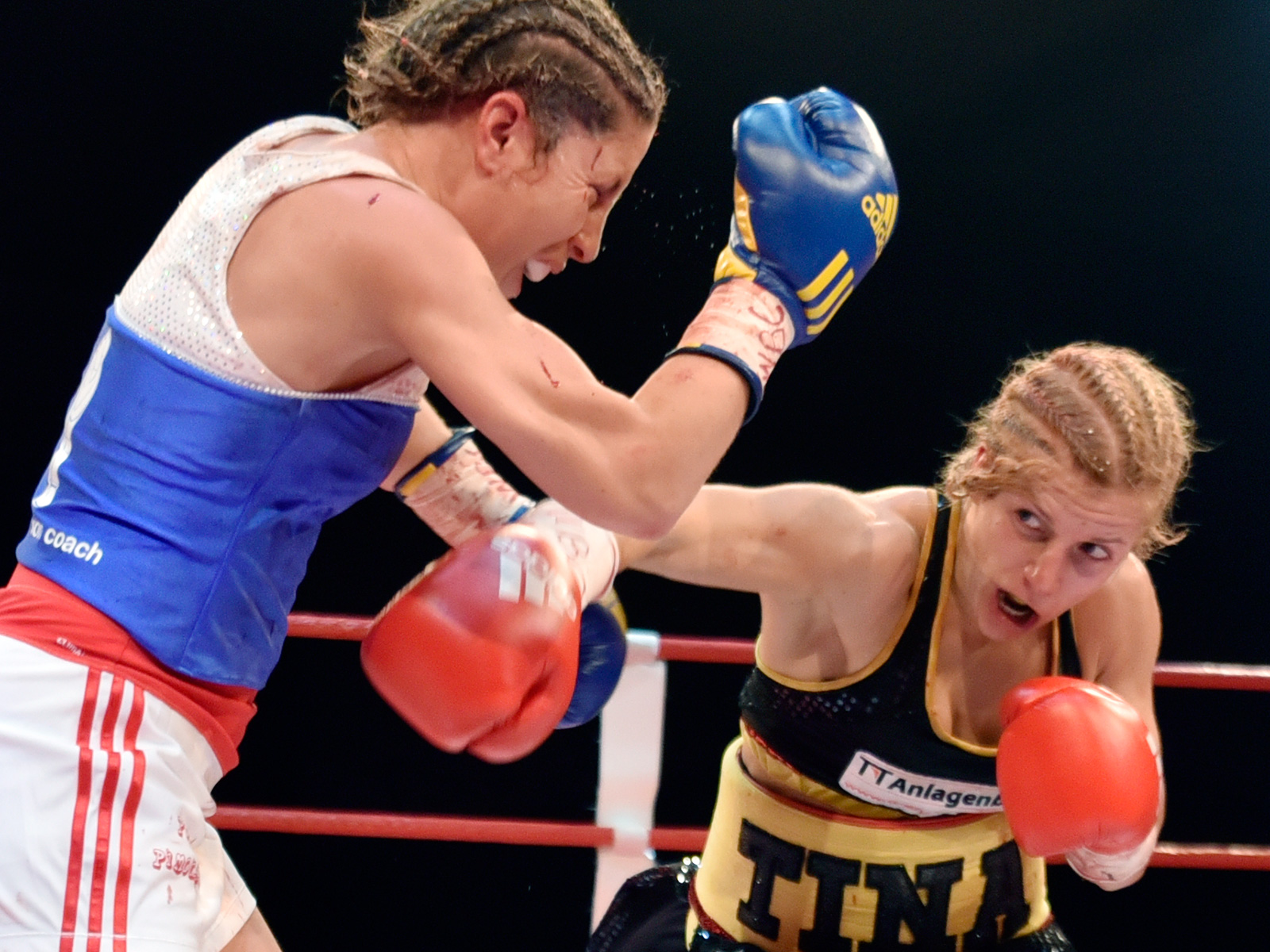
- Anne-Sophie Da Costa and Tina Rupprecht boxing, 2017
- Also known as: Pugilism
- Focus: Punching, Striking
- Olympic sport: Yes, as of the 2012 Olympics

Although women have participated in boxing for almost as long as the sport has existed, female fights have been effectively outlawed for most of boxing's history until recently, with athletic commissioners refusing to sanction or issue licenses to women boxers, and most nations officially banning the sport. Reports of women entering the ring go back to the 18th century.

== Historical overview ==
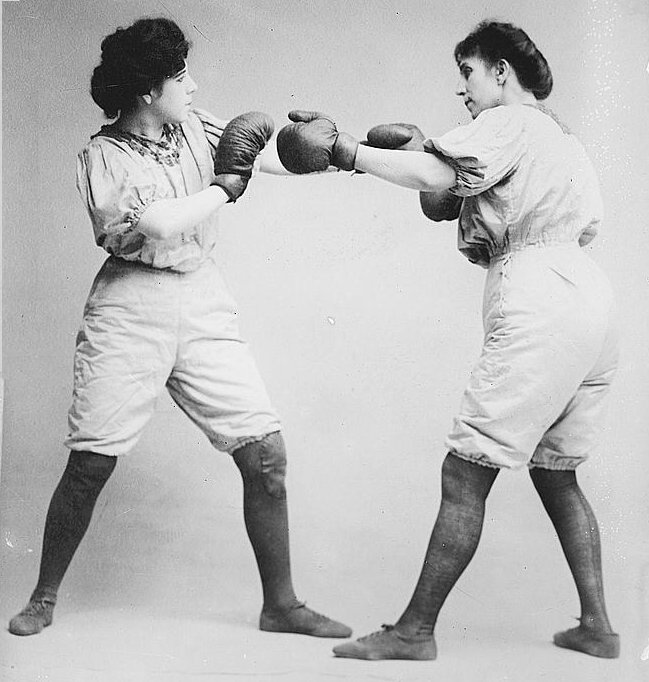
Bennett sisters boxing, c.1910–1915

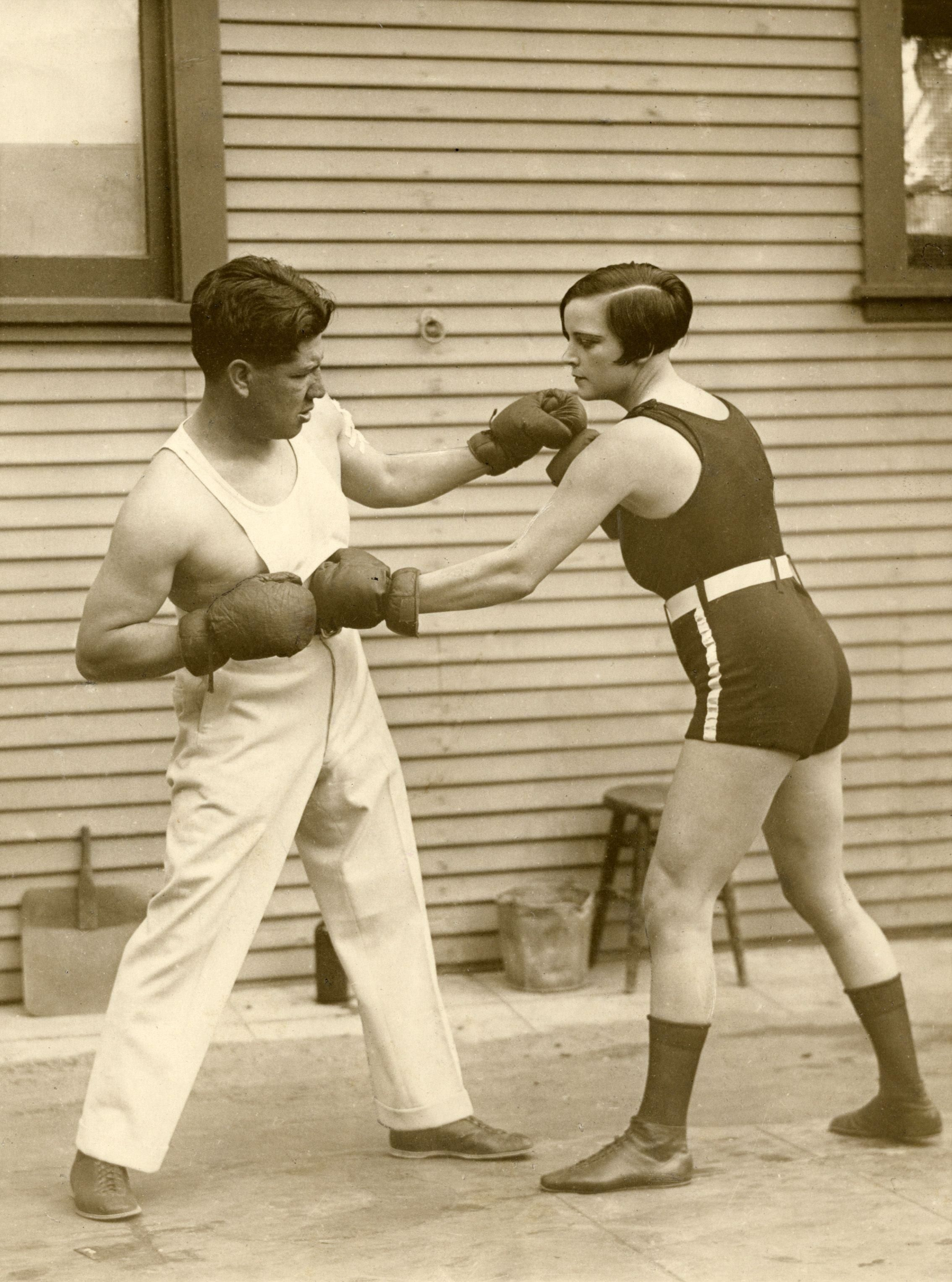
Louise Adler, female lightweight world boxing champion of the 1920s, training for her title defense

One of the earliest mentions of women's boxing is in the travelogue of a German man who visited London in 1710. While taking in a men's boxing match, he met a woman in the audience who claimed to have previously boxed another woman in the same venue.

One of the earliest known women's boxing matches to have been advertised in print was in London between Elizabeth Wilkinson and Hannah Hyfield in 1722. Billing herself as the "European Championess", Wilkinson and her husband would also fight other mixed couples as a pair, with Wilkinson fighting the other woman, and her husband fighting the other man. In those days, the rules of boxing allowed kicking, gouging and other methods of attack not part of today's arsenal.

Women's boxing first appeared in the Olympic Games as a demonstration sport in 1904, in St. Louis.

During the 1920s, Professor Andrew Newton formed a Women's Boxing Club in London. However women's boxing was hugely controversial. In early 1926, Shoreditch borough council banned an arranged exhibition match between boxers Annie Newton and Madge Baker, a student of Digger Stanley. An attempt to hold the match in nearby Hackney instead was defeated by a campaign led by the Mayor of Hackney, who wrote, "I regard this proposed exhibition of women boxers as a gratification of the sensual ideals of a crowd of vulgar men." The Home Secretary Sir William Joynson-Hicks was among those opposing the match, claiming "the Legislature never imagined that such a disgraceful exhibition would have been staged in this country." The story was reported across the country and even internationally.

In 1988 the Swedish Amateur Boxing Association sanctioned events for women.

In 1997 the British Amateur Boxing Association sanctioned its first boxing competition for women. The first event was meant to be between two thirteen-year-olds, but one of the boxers dropped out because of hostile media attention. A month later, an event was held between two sixteen-year-olds.

The British Boxing Board of Control refused to issue licenses to women until they issued one to Jane Couch in 1998. By the end of the century, however, they had issued five such licenses. The first sanctioned professional bout between women in the U.K. was in November 1998 at Streatham in London, between Jane Couch and Simona Lukic. Couch won.

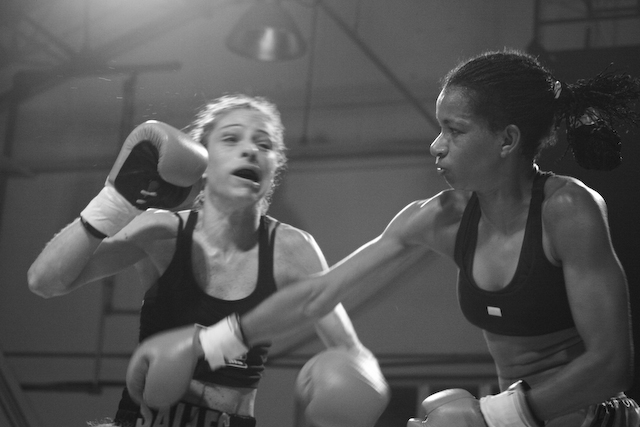
Renata Cristina Dos Santos Ferreira punches Adriana Salles, São Paulo, Brazil (2006)

The International Boxing Association (amateur) accepted new rules for women's boxing at the end of the 20th century and approved the first European Cup for Women in 1999 and the first World Championship for women in 2001. In October 2001 the first women's world amateur boxing championships, called the 2001 Women's World Amateur Boxing Championships, were held in Scranton, in the United States.

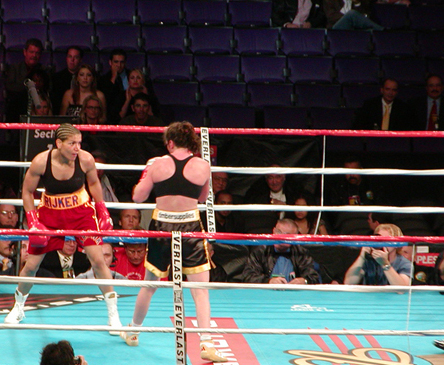
Lucia Rijker and Jane Couch boxing, 2003

Women's boxing was not featured at the 2008 Olympics; however, on 14 August 2009, it was announced that the International Olympic Committee's Executive Board (EB) had approved the inclusion of women's boxing for the Games in London in the 2012 Olympics, contrary to the expectations of some observers. Around these (2009) hearings, in conjunction with AIBA (International Boxing Association), the International Olympic Committee agreed to include three additional women's weight classes to the 2012 London Olympic Games. A new "gender-appropriate" women's boxing uniform was being created at the time, which would have required women (under AIBA rules) to wear skirts during competition. The issue was widely ignored by the public until amateur boxer and London student Elizabeth Plank brought the issue to light. She created a petition at Change.com to end the gender-based mandatory uniforms. It was eventually decided (before the 2012 Olympics) to give women boxers the option of wearing shorts or a skirt.

Women were allowed to competitively box for the first time at the Olympics during the 2012 Summer Olympics, in London, producing the world's first 12 female Olympic medalist boxers. Nicola Adams of Great Britain won the world's first Olympic women's boxing gold medal.

On 14 September 2014, after defeating Croatian Ivana Habazin, Cecilia Brækhus became the first Norwegian and the first woman to hold all major world championship belts in her weight division (welterweight) in boxing history.

In 2015 the World Boxing Federation unified various women's titles to have one title holder.

In 2024, Cindy Ngamba became the first boxer chosen for the Refugee Olympic Team; later that year she became the first medalist for the Refugee Olympic Team at the Olympics, having won bronze in women's 75 kg boxing at the 2024 Summer Olympics.

== Algeria ==
See also: 2024 Summer Olympics boxing controversy
On 9 August 2024, Algerian boxer Imane Khelif defeated Yang Liu of China in the final to win an Olympic gold medal. Khelif therefore became Algeria's first female gold medalist in boxing, as well as the country's first boxer of any gender to win a medal since Mohamed Allalou in 2000 and the first to win a gold medal since Hocine Soltani in 1996.

Khelif had been disqualified from the 2023 Women's World Boxing Championships organized by the Russian-led International Boxing Association (IBA) after failing unspecified gender eligibility tests, along with boxer Lin Yu-ting. The International Olympic Committee (IOC) and its Paris Boxing Unit criticized the disqualification as "sudden and arbitrary" and taken "without any due process". The Washington Post stated, "It remains unclear what standards Khelif and Lin Yu Ting failed [in 2023] to lead to the disqualifications." The IBA did not reveal the testing methodology, stating the "specifics remain confidential". The IBA's Olympic status was revoked in June 2023, due to governance issues and perceived judging and refereeing corruption.

In May 2025, World Boxing announced the implementation of sex verification testing for all athletes in events sanctioned by the group; its announcement specifically singled out Khelif by saying she would be barred from competing until she underwent genetic sex screening. World Boxing's president Boris van der Vorst apologized to the Algerian federation for what it perceived as a violation of her privacy. Khelif had intended to return to international competition at the Eindhoven Box Cup in June 2025. However, following World Boxing's announcement of mandatory sex testing, tournament officials reported that Khelif had not registered for the event. In August 2025, she appealed the World Boxing decision. On September 1, the Court of Arbitration for Sport publicly acknowledged the appeal, but refused her request to suspend the World Boxing decision until the case was heard. As a result, Khelif was unable to participate in the World Boxing championship that started on September 4, 2025.

== Argentina ==
In Argentina, women's boxing has experienced a notable rise in popularity, due in part to the presence of boxers such as Alejandra Oliveras, Marcela Acuna, Yesica Bopp and Erica Farias.

== Australia ==
While not being urged to avoid competition, women had few opportunities to compete in sport in Australia until the 1880s. After that date, new sporting facilities were being built around the country and many new sport clubs were created. Boxing classes were being offered to women in Australia by 1892, at locations such as the Brisbane Gymnasium on Turbot Street, close to the city's railway station. While classes may have been offered for women, serious training was not permitted for women by the 1900s and women were banned from pursuing the sport in a competitive way. Women were also barred from attending boxing matches. New South Wales banned women's boxing from 1986 to 2009. Women's boxing was resumed in NSW with an exhibition fight between Kaye Scott and Ramona Stephenson in October 2009. Women's boxing was legalized in Queensland in 2000.

In 2002, Desi Kontos of South Australia became the first Australian woman to represent the country at the boxing world championships.

Naomi Fischer-Rasmussen was the first female boxer to represent Australia at the Olympics when she competed at the 2012 Summer Olympics.

Caitlin Parker became the first Australian female boxer to win an Olympic medal when she won bronze at the 2024 Summer Olympics.

== Canada ==
In 2023, women competed in boxing at the Canada Games for the first time. Talia Birch of Team Quebec and Emily Vigneault of Team Alberta won the first Canada Games gold medals for boxing in their divisions; Birch won in the 52-kg female division and Vigneault won in the 60-kg female division. Those were the only female divisions in boxing in the 2023 Canada Games.

== China ==
In 2024, Ruru Yang Sheau-ru became Hong Kong's first woman professional boxer to win a world title, due to winning the Women's International Boxing Association super bantamweight belt by defeating Tanwarat Saengiamjit from Thailand. The match was held in Bangkok.

Later that year, Chang Yuan defeated Turkish boxer Hatice Akbaş by 5–0 to win the gold medal in women's 54 kg boxing at the 2024 Summer Olympics, which made Chang the first Chinese female boxer to win a gold medal at any Olympics.

== Cuba ==
In 2022 women became allowed to participate officially in the sport of boxing in Cuba, for the first time since they were banned from doing so during the Revolution of Fidel Castro in 1959.

Cuba’s national school of boxing opened to women in January 2023.

== Czech Republic ==
In 2018 Fabiana Bytyqi became the first female boxer from the Czech Republic to win a major world title, when she defeated Denise Castle to win the vacant WBC atomweight title. The fight took place at the Sportcentrum Sluneta in Ústí nad Labem, on 22 September 2018. She won the fight by unanimous decision, with two judges awarding her a 100–90 scorecard, while the third judge awarded her a 99–91 scorecard.

== Gaza Strip ==
In 2019 the first female boxing club in the Gaza Strip, the Palestinian Center of Boxing for Women, opened.

== Ghana ==
Sarah Lotus Asare, the first female boxing matchmaker licensed under the Ghana Boxing Authority, debuted as a matchmaker on August 26, 2023.

On 24 November 2024, Abigail Quartey faced British boxer Sangeeta Birdi for the vacant WIBF World Super Bantamweight title at the Bukom Boxing Arena. Quartey won by unanimous decision, making her the first Ghanaian woman to hold a world boxing title.

== Hungary ==
Luca Hámori competed at the 2024 Summer Olympics, becoming the first female boxer to represent Hungary at the Olympic Games.

== India ==
Mary Kom of India is a five-time World Amateur Boxing champion. She is the only woman boxer to have won a medal in each one of the six world championships.

Three Indian female boxers, namely, Pinki Jangra, Mary Kom, and Kavita Chahal were placed in the world's top three in AIBA world rankings (on 1 March 2014) in their respective categories.

Jaismine Lamboria is the first woman boxer to join the Indian Army, which she did after she won bronze at the 2022 Commonwealth Games.

== Iran ==
Sadaf Khadem defeated French boxer Anne Chauvin in a boxing match in France on April 14, 2019; this made her the first Iranian woman to be part of an official boxing match. However, the Iranian Boxing Federation distanced itself from the match and released a statement reading:

As women's boxing is not a sanctioned sport of the Islamic Republic of Iran Boxing Federation, the organization, training, and participation in this sport is not related to this federation and it is the organizer and participant's responsibilities.

Following the match, Khadem had plans to return to Iran, but lingering rumors of potential arrest warrants kept her in France. Khadem's representative told Reuters that authorities had issued arrest warrants against her. Hossein Soori, the head of Iran's boxing federation, denied Khadem would be arrested, attributing the information to "media linked to Saudi Arabia".

== Ireland ==
In 1997, Deirdre Gogarty challenged Bonnie Canino for the Women's International Boxing Federation's Women's World Featherweight Championship. Gogarty won, making her the first Irishwoman to win any boxing world title; the fight occurred in the United States.

In February 1999, Deirdre Nelson, from County Antrim, was granted a professional boxing licence by the British Boxing Board of Control, which gave her the right to box anywhere within the European Boxing Union. However, the Boxing Union of Ireland forbid her to box until guidelines on women's boxing were issued by the European Boxing Union in September 1999. In 2001 Nelson won a sex discrimination case against the Boxing Union of Ireland due to this; she was awarded £1,500 in compensation. The Employment Equality Authority (based in Dublin) stated that the Boxing Union of Ireland had discriminated against Nelson, violating the Employment Equality Act of 1977.

In 2001, Irishwoman Katie Taylor won the first officially sanctioned female boxing match in Ireland, at the National Stadium, defeating Alanna Audley from Belfast. In 2012, the first year women competed in boxing at the Olympics, Katie Taylor won an Olympic gold medal in boxing; she was the first ever Olympic female lightweight champion. In 2023, she defeated Chantelle Cameron; this win made Taylor the second female boxer, and the first Irish female boxer, to be an undisputed champion in two weight classes; the first was the American female boxer Claressa Shields.

In 2020 and 2024, Kellie Harrington won a gold medal in boxing at the Olympics; this made her the first Irish boxer to win consecutive Olympic gold medals.

== Kosovo ==
Marigona Beadini was the first female boxer in Kosovo.

== Mexico ==
In 1998 Laura Serrano was supposed to fight in Mexico City, but the match was canceled due to a 1947 ban against women boxing in Mexico City. The ban was eventually ended. In 2015 Serrano became the first female Mexican boxer inducted into the International Women's Boxing Hall of Fame.

In 2005 Mexican female boxer Jackie Nava became the first woman to win a female world title fight sanctioned by the WBC.

== Norway ==
On September 14, 2014, after defeating Croatian Ivana Habazin, Cecilia Brækhus became the first Norwegian and the first woman to hold all major world championship belts in her weight division (welterweight) in boxing history.

== Netherlands ==
In 2019, Lucia Rijker became one of the first three women boxers (and the first Dutch woman boxer) elected to the International Boxing Hall of Fame; 2019 was the first year that women were on the ballot.

== North Korea ==
In 2024, Pang Chol-mi became the first North Korean woman to win any Olympic medal in boxing, winning a bronze medal.

== Puerto Rico ==
In 2017, fighting on the Shawn Porter vs. Andre Berto undercard, Puerto Rican boxer Amanda Serrano dominated Dahiana Santana en route to an eighth-round KO victory to win the vacant World Boxing Organization bantamweight belt, which made her the first female boxer to win world titles in five weight divisions.

== Philippines ==
Nesthy Petecio won a silver medal in the inaugural women's featherweight event at the 2020 Summer Olympics, making her the first Filipino woman to win an Olympic medal in boxing.

== Saudi Arabia ==
In 2022, Somalian boxer Ramla Ali defeated Dominican boxer Crystal Garcia Nova in the first professional women's boxing match held in Saudi Arabia.

In 2023, Ragad Al-Naimi became the first Saudi female professional boxer, by having her first professional fight; she won against Perpetual Okaidah in a fight held in Diriyah.

In 2024, Skye Nicolson of Australia defeated Raven Chapman of the United Kingdom in what was the first women's world title boxing fight held in Saudi Arabia and the first women's bout to be on a Riyadh Season show. She won by unanimous decision.

== Serbia ==
Nina Radovanović was the first female boxer to represent Serbia in the Olympics when she competed in the flyweight division at the delayed 2020 Tokyo Games.

== Somalia ==
Ramla Ali was the first boxer to win an international gold medal while representing Somalia. Later, in 2021, she competed in the women's featherweight event at the 2020 Summer Olympics. Although she lost her first fight, she became the first boxer ever to represent Somalia on the Olympic stage. In 2022, she defeated Dominican boxer Crystal Garcia Nova in the first professional women's boxing match held in Saudi Arabia.

== South Korea ==
In 2024, Im Ae-ji became the first South Korean woman to win any Olympic medal in boxing, winning a bronze medal.

== Sweden ==
In 1988, the Swedish Amateur Boxing Association sanctioned events for women.

== Taiwan ==
See also: 2024 Summer Olympics boxing controversy
Lin Yu-ting won an Olympic gold medal in boxing in 2024 after defeating Julia Szeremeta of Poland in the final of the women's 57 kg category (featherweight). With this win, Lin became the first Taiwanese boxer to win an Olympic gold medal.

Lin had been disqualified from the 2023 Women's World Boxing Championships organized by the Russian-led International Boxing Association (IBA) after failing unspecified gender eligibility tests, along with Algerian boxer Imane Khelif. She was stripped of a bronze medal, which was instead awarded to Bulgaria's Svetlana Staneva. The International Olympic Committee (IOC) and its Paris Boxing Unit criticized the disqualification as "sudden and arbitrary" and taken "without any due process". The Washington Post stated, "It remains unclear what standards Khelif and Lin Yu Ting failed [in 2023] to lead to the disqualifications." The IBA did not reveal the testing methodology, stating the "specifics remain confidential". The IBA's Olympic status was revoked in June 2023, due to governance issues and perceived judging and refereeing corruption. Later in 2023, Lin competed at the Hangzhou Asian Games, where she won Taiwan's first gold medal in boxing at the event.

== Tonga ==
In 2024, Feʻofaʻaki Epenisa became the first female boxer from Tonga to take part in the Olympics. She lost to Vietnam's Hà Thị Linh in the 60kg division round-of-32 at the 2024 Summer Olympics.

== United Kingdom ==
One of the earliest mentions of women's boxing is in the travelogue of a German man who visited London in 1710. While taking in a men's boxing match, he met a woman in the audience who claimed to have previously boxed another woman in the same venue.

One of the earliest known fights to have been advertised in print was in London between Elizabeth Wilkinson and Hannah Hyfield in 1722. Billing herself as the "European Championess", Wilkinson and her husband would also fight other mixed couples as a pair, with Wilkinson fighting the other woman and her husband, the other man. In those days, the rules of boxing allowed kicking, gouging and other methods of attack not part of today's arsenal.

During the 1920s, Professor Andrew Newton formed a Women's Boxing Club in London. However women's boxing was hugely controversial. In early 1926, Shoreditch borough council banned an arranged exhibition match between boxers Annie Newton and Madge Baker, a student of Digger Stanley. An attempt to hold the match in nearby Hackney instead was defeated by a campaign led by the Mayor of Hackney, who wrote, "I regard this proposed exhibition of women boxers as a gratification of the sensual ideals of a crowd of vulgar men." The Home Secretary Sir William Joynson-Hicks was among those opposing the match, claiming "the Legislature never imagined that such a disgraceful exhibition would have been staged in this country." The story was reported across the country and even internationally.

In 1997 the British Amateur Boxing Association sanctioned its first boxing competition for women. The first event was meant to be between two thirteen-year-olds, but one of the boxers dropped out because of hostile media attention. A month later, an event was held between two sixteen-year-olds.

Jane Couch became the first licensed female boxer in the United Kingdom in 1998. The British Boxing Board of Control initially refused to grant Couch a professional licence on the sole ground that she was a woman, and argued that PMS made women too unstable to box. Claiming sexual discrimination and supported by the Equal Opportunities Commission, Couch managed to have this decision overturned by a tribunal in March 1998. However, some criticism followed; the British Medical Association called this result "a demented extension of equal opportunities". The first sanctioned professional boxing match between women in the U.K. was in November 1998 at Streatham in London, between Couch and Simona Lukic. Couch won.

In 2001, Nicola Adams became the first woman boxer ever to represent England, which she did in a fight against an Irish boxer. In 2007 she became the first English female boxer to win a medal in a major boxing tournament, taking silver in the European Championships. In 2008 she won a silver medal that was Britain's first women's world championship medal in women's boxing.

In 2009 Natasha Jonas became the first female boxer to compete for GB Boxing.

Women were allowed to competitively box for the first time at the Olympics during the 2012 Summer Olympics in London, producing the world's first 12 female Olympic medalist boxers. Representing Great Britain, Nicola Adams won the world's first Olympic women's boxing gold medal. This win also made her the first openly LGBT person to win an Olympic boxing gold medal. Also in 2012, Adams became the first female boxer to receive an award from the Boxing Writers' Club of Great Britain. Specifically, she was awarded the Joe Bromley Award for outstanding services to boxing. She was also the first woman ever to be invited to the club's awards ceremony.

At the 2014 Commonwealth Games, Lauren Price became the first Welsh woman to win a boxing medal in the Commonwealth Games, winning a bronze.

In 2019 English boxer Barbara Buttrick became one of the first three women boxers (and the first English woman boxer) elected to the International Boxing Hall of Fame; 2019 was the first year that women were on the ballot.

In 2021, Lauren Price became the first Welsh boxer of any gender to win an Olympic gold medal.

In 2022 two female boxers headlined at a major venue in the United Kingdom for the first time, which occurred at the O2 Arena. That fight was a title unification bout between Claressa Shields and Savannah Marshall. Shields won via unanimous decision with two judges scoring the fight 97–93 and one scoring it 96–94, all in favor of Shields to become the undisputed middleweight world champion. As well, the fight headlined the first all-female boxing card in the United Kingdom. Later in the year, Chantelle Cameron defeated Jessica McCaskill in a match held in Abu Dhabi, making Cameron the undisputed world light-welterweight champion and the United Kingdom's first undisputed female boxing world champion.

Natasha Jonas won the British Boxing Board of Control’s 2022 British Boxer of the Year award, which made her the first woman to win the British Boxing Board of Control's British Boxer of the Year Award.

On 6 May 2023, Lauren Price won the first British women's title fight in professional boxing history, becoming the first female British welterweight champion and the first woman to receive a Lonsdale Belt, by defeating Kirstie Bavington by unanimous points victory.

In October 2023, Natasha Jonas became the first black woman to receive a manager's license from the British Boxing Board of Control.

On 14 March 2024 it was announced that Lauren Price would challenge Jessica McCaskill for her WBA, IBO, and Ring female welterweight World titles on 11 May 2024 in Cardiff, Wales. Price won the contest by unanimous technical decision after an accidental clash of heads that took place in the fifth round caused an injury to McCaskill's eye and she was ruled unable to continue at the start of round nine. This win made Price Wales’ first female professional boxing world champion.

== United States ==
In 1876, the first women's boxing match was held in the United States. In this match Nell Saunders defeated Rose Harland. Her prize was $200 and a silver butter dish.

Women's boxing first appeared in the Olympic Games as a demonstration sport in 1904, in St. Louis.

In 1954, Barbara Buttrick was part of the first boxing match between two women on American national television.

In 1975, Caroline Svendsen became the first woman to receive a boxing license in the United States when she was granted one in Nevada.

Also in 1975, Jackie Tonawanda sued the New York State Athletic Commission (NYSAC) for denying her a boxing license because of her gender. This resulted in the case Garrett v. New York State Athletic Commission (1975) at the New York Supreme Court (Tonawanda was also known as Jacqueline Garrett) which was decided in her favor. However, this did not overturn the law in New York against women boxing. But Cathy Davis sued the New York State Athletic Commission in 1977 because she was denied a boxing license because she was a woman, and the case was decided in her favor later that year, with the judge invalidating New York State rule number 205.15, which stated, "No woman may be licensed as a boxer or second or licensed to compete in any wrestling exhibition with men." In his opinion the judge cited the precedent set by Garrett v. New York State Athletic Commission (1975), which "found the regulation invalid under the equal protection clauses of the State and Federal Constitutions". The NYSAC filed an appeal of the ruling, but later dropped it. In August 1978 Cathy Davis became the first woman to be on the cover of The Ring. On September 19, 1978, Davis received the NYSAC's first boxing license given to a female boxer.

In 1976, Pat Pineda became the first female boxer to be licensed in California.

In 1979, a lawsuit made California change its boxing regulations, which had limited women boxers to no more than four rounds.

During the 1980s, women's boxing briefly resurfaced in public notice in California due to the twin sisters Dora and Cora Webber. They were world champions. Other women boxers went on hunger strikes to be noticed.

But the boom of women's boxing came during the 1990s, coinciding with the boom in professional women sports leagues such as the WNBA and WUSA, and with boxers such as Stephanie Jaramillo, Delia 'Chikita' Gonzalez, Christy Martin, Laila Ali, Jackie Frazier-Lyde, Bonnie Canino and Sumya Anani, all world champions, jumping into the scene.

On 16 April 1992, after eight years in court in Massachusetts, Gail Grandchamp won her battle to become a boxer, as a Massachusetts state Superior Court judge ruled it was illegal to deny someone a chance to box based on gender. During her battle to win the right to box as an amateur, she passed the age of 36, the maximum age for amateur fighters. Even though she knew it would not help her as an amateur, Grandchamp continued her efforts, and eventually did box professionally for a time.

Dallas Malloy was denied an application by USA Boxing due to being female. She sued and U.S. District Judge Barbara Rothstein allowed her to box by granting a preliminary injunction. In October 1993, Malloy defeated Heather Poyner in the United States' first sanctioned amateur boxing match between two female boxers. USA Boxing lifted its ban on women's boxing later in 1993. When USA Boxing officially recognized women's boxing in 1993, it became the first organization to do so in the world.

Also in 1993, Don King, the world-famous boxing promoter, signed American boxer Christy Martin in October, making Martin the first female boxer to sign with King.

In 1995, the New York Golden Gloves allowed women boxers to compete for the first time.

On March 16, 1996, a boxing match took place that is often called the fight that "put women's boxing on the map", or "the bout that made women's boxing". It was held in Nevada between American Christy Martin and Irishwoman Deirdre Gogarty. The fight was won by Martin, in a six rounds unanimous decision, and led to her featuring as the first female boxer on the cover of Sports Illustrated on April 15, 1996; the headline read, "The Lady Is a Champ".

In October 2001 the first women's world amateur boxing championships, called the 2001 Women's World Amateur Boxing Championships, were held in Scranton, in the United States.

In 2002 Canadian-born American boxing promoter Aileen Eaton became the first woman inducted into the International Boxing Hall of Fame.

On April 2, 2005 Becky Zerlentes was participating in the Colorado State Boxing Senior Female Championships at the Denver Coliseum in Denver. She was knocked out in the third round by her opponent, Heather Schmitz, fell unconscious, and died without regaining consciousness. This made Zerlentes the first woman known to have died of injuries sustained during a sanctioned boxing match in the United States. According to the Denver County coroner the cause of death was blunt force trauma to the head.

Women were allowed to competitively box for the first time at the Olympics during the 2012 Summer Olympics in London, producing the world's first 12 female Olympic medalist boxers. At those Olympics, Claressa Shields became the first American woman to win a boxing gold medal. As well, Marlen Esparza became the first American woman to qualify for the Olympics in women's boxing when she qualified for those Olympics. She went on to defeat Karlha Magliocco, making her the first American woman winner of an Olympic boxing match, and to win a bronze medal, making her the first American woman winner of any Olympic boxing medal.

In 2014 the International Women's Boxing Hall of Fame, located in America, held its first induction.

Claressa Shields won a gold medal in the women's middleweight division at the 2016 Olympics; as she had already won a gold medal (in the same division) at the 2012 Olympics, this made her the first American boxer of any gender to win consecutive Olympic medals.

Also in 2016, Christy Martin became the first female boxer inducted into the Nevada Boxing Hall of Fame.

American major boxing broadcasting network HBO broadcast its first women's bout, between Norway's Cecilia Brækhus and America's Kali Reis, on May 5, 2018, which Brækhus won.

In 2019 American boxer Christy Martin became one of the first three women boxers (and the first American woman boxer) elected to the International Boxing Hall of Fame; 2019 was the first year that women were on the ballot.

In 2021, American Claressa Shields defeated Marie-Eve Dicaire and thus became the first boxer in the four-belt era to hold undisputed titles in two weight classes, and the first female boxer ever to be an undisputed champion in two weight classes.

The first women's boxing match to headline Madison Square Garden, described as the 'biggest women's fight of all time', was held on April 30, 2022, between Katie Taylor and Amanda Serrano, with Taylor's undisputed lightweight titles on the line. Taylor defeated Serrano by split decision.

In 2023, New York boxer Kathy "Wildcat" Collins became the first female boxer inducted into the New York State Boxing Hall of Fame.

Also in 2023, American boxer Claressa Shields became the first woman to win the Best Boxer ESPY Award.

In 2024, President-elect Donald Trump said in a keynote address for Turning Point USA, "There's a spirit that we have now that we didn't have just a short while ago. Sadly, we didn't have. Who the hell can have spirit watching women get beat up in a boxing ring? I don't think that's spirit, right? We're going to end that one quick! We're going to end it very quickly. We're going to end that one very quickly." Trump had previously falsely said boxers Lin Yu-ting and Imane Khelif "transitioned from men to women", and said their wins were "demeaning to women". He said about Khelif's win over Italian boxer Angela Carini that "this beautiful young woman from Italy" fought against a "man".

On February 2, 2025, American boxer Claressa Shields faced Danielle Perkins for the undisputed heavyweight championship at Dort Financial Center in Flint, Michigan. Shields scored the fight's lone knockdown in the waning seconds of the tenth round and won the bout by unanimous decision with the judges' scorecards reading 97-92, 99-90, and 100-89- all for Shields. Thanks to the victory, she became the only three-division undisputed champion, male or female, of the four-belt era, as well as the first female undisputed heavyweight champion ever.

The first all-women’s boxing card at Madison Square Garden was held on July 11, 2025. A bout between Katie Taylor and Amanda Serrano, which Taylor won, headlined the card.

Professional women's boxing has declined in popularity in the United States and struggles to get viewership and sponsorship. Many women boxers have to fight in Mexico or Europe to make a good living. The sport has largely been supplanted by Women's MMA, which is increasingly popular in the USA.

== Zambia ==
Margret Tembo was the first female boxer to represent Zambia at the Olympics. She represented Zambia at the 2024 Summer Olympics in Paris where she was defeated in the first round of the women's 50kg boxing event by Finland's Pihla Kaivo-oja.

== Differences between men and women's boxing rules ==
Women's boxing matches are usually ten rounds at most, with two minutes per round, while men's boxing matches are twelve rounds of three minutes each. In 2017 the president of the World Boxing Council stated, "The WBC will not sanction any bout for women if rounds are scheduled for 3 minutes, and will not sanction any bout scheduled for 12 rounds."

As stated by the International Boxing Association Technical Rules and Competition Rules:

– head guards are necessary for female boxers of any age;

– a breast guard is advised for female fighters in addition to a pubic (crotch) guard;

– pregnant sportswomen are not allowed to engage in combat.

British rules require all female boxers to wear 10-ounce gloves, while male boxers are required to wear 8-ounce gloves for all divisions up to welterweight and 10-ounce gloves only above welterweight.

== Women's boxing in culture ==
In the mid-1950s, Louis Farrakhan, as "The Charmer", released (among other songs) the song "Female Boxer", which contains some sexist overtones.

Until the 1990s, movies about female boxers were sparse and marketed as softcore X-rated films to cater to the mainstream male gaze. However, throughout the 1990s and 2000s, movies such as Blonde Fist (1991), Shadow Boxers (1999), and Girlfight (2000) were released and, according to scholar Camilla Fojas, changed boxing culture. The 2004 film Million Dollar Baby, about a female boxer, received seven nominations at the 77th Academy Awards and won four categories: Best Picture, Best Director (for Clint Eastwood), Best Actress (for Hilary Swank, who played the boxer), and Best Supporting Actor (for Morgan Freeman). It has since been cited as one of the best movies of the 2000s, the 21st century, and of all-time.

Women's boxing has also been the topic of some books, for example Leah Hager Cohen's Without Apology: Girls, Women, and the Desire to Fight (2005).

In 2018, a Barbie doll based on British boxer Nicola Adams was produced; it was the first boxer Barbie doll.

The names of boxers Nicola Adams and Michelle Sutcliffe are two of those featured on the sculpture Ribbons, unveiled in 2024.

== See also ==
- List of current female world boxing champions
- List of female boxers
- List of IBF female world champions
- List of WBA female world champions
- List of WBC female world champions
- List of WBO female world champions
- List of WIBO world champions
- Women Boxing Archive Network
- Women's boxing in Australia

== Bibliography ==
- Smith, Malissa (2014). A History of Women's Boxing. Lanham, Maryland: Rowman & Littlefield. ISBN 978-1-4422-2995-2.
