= Transvestigation =

Conspiracy theory regarding gender and sex

Transvestigation (a portmanteau of transgender and investigation) is a conspiracy theory that asserts that many celebrities and other prominent individuals are transgender (or, conversely, that some openly transgender celebrities are cisgender). Proponents claim to be able to determine the assigned sex of individuals, primarily through photographic and video evidence. The methods used by "transvestigators" are subject to pareidolia and confirmation bias.

Athletes, celebrities, and prominent politicians have all been subject to the conspiracy theory. Brigitte Macron, the spouse of the president of France, filed lawsuits against allegations that she was born male.

In the aftermath of the boxing controversy at the 2024 Olympic Games, the term gained renewed attention in light of accusations against Imane Khelif and Lin Yu-ting.

== Conspiracy theories ==
The basis for transvestigation ranges from the belief that some celebrities' gender identity simply differs from their birth-assigned sex, to the belief that their transgender identity is part of an initiation ritual known as "elite gender inversion", conducted by Hollywood and music industry elites or secret organizations such as the New World Order and Illuminati. GLAAD, a US organization focused on media coverage of LGBTQ+ matters, considers the movement to be an expression of transphobia. The theories have gained considerable popularity on the social media platform Twitter, especially after Elon Musk's participation in the harassment of Imane Khelif and of his own transgender daughter.

=== France ===
Brigitte Macron, the spouse of the president of France, has sought legal action against the allegation that she was born male. The conspiracy theory, which suggests that she was previously known as "Jean-Michel Trogneux", has been traced to a far-right author in France, and has trended on social media. In 2024, two women named Natacha Rey and Amandine Roy were found guilty of slander and ordered to pay damages, but the Paris Appeals Court overturned the conviction the following year, arguing that the defendants had made the mistake in "good faith".

In July 2025, French President Emmanuel and Brigitte Macron sued US political commentator Candace Owens and her limited liability company for defamation and false light in the US state of Delaware, alleging that Owens had endorsed the conspiracy theory that Brigitte Macron was secretly transgender. In April 2026, US President Donald Trump rejected Owens's statements, and commented that he wanted the Macrons to "win lots of money" from the lawsuit.

=== United States ===
Former First Lady Michelle Obama has frequently been accused of being a trans woman, which Noah Berlatsky of the Pacific Standard considers unsurprising, stating that "just as trans women are stereotypically caricatured as faking femininity, Black women are caricatured as innately non-feminine" within the United States. The theory received renewed attention in 2026 when MMA fighter Josh Hokit referenced the conspiracy at UFC Freedom 250, which The Guardian considered to be an example of misogynoir.

== Sports ==
Women's sports forms a popular arena for transvestigation, partly because the relatively muscular appearance of many athletes does not tend to fit the stereotyped feminine beauty ideal. This is buttressed by sporting practices such as sex eligibility tests. During the controversy around women's boxing at the 2024 Olympics, public figures such as industrialist Elon Musk, children's author J.K. Rowling, and US politician JD Vance asserted that Imane Khelif was a man, and the Boston Globe retracted a headline that wrongly asserted she was trans. Khelif filed a criminal complaint against Musk and Rowling in France alleging gender-based cyberharassment.

Many athletes of the Women's National Basketball Association has been the subject of transinvestigation. WNBA athletes such as Caitlin Clark, Angel Reese, and Sophie Cunningham (herself an advocate against trans women in sports) have all been accused by a 50,000-member Facebook group of secretly being biological men. No transgender women have ever played in the WNBA.

== See also ==
- Passing (gender) – Ability to be perceived as the gender one identifies as
- Sex verification in sports
- Transmisogyny – Intersection of transphobia and misogyny
- Misogynoir – Term for a type of misogyny toward black women
- Physiognomy – Pseudoscience of face reading
- Melania Trump replacement conspiracy theory
- Gender policing
- Character assassination
- Angry black woman
- Ideal womanhood
- Body shaming
