= Ann Newton =

Ann Newton may refer to:

- Nancy Dawson, stage name of Ann Newton (c.1728–1767), English dancer and actress
- Ann Mary Newton (1832–1866), English painter

== See also ==
- Annie Newton (1893–1955), London's first and principal woman boxer
