= 2024 Summer Olympics boxing controversy =

Timeline of key events behind the controversy
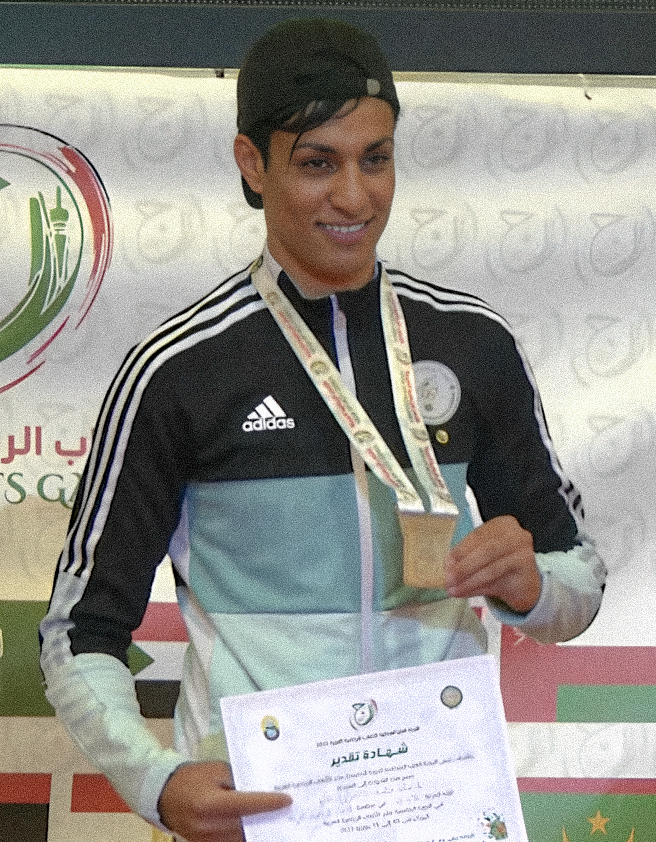
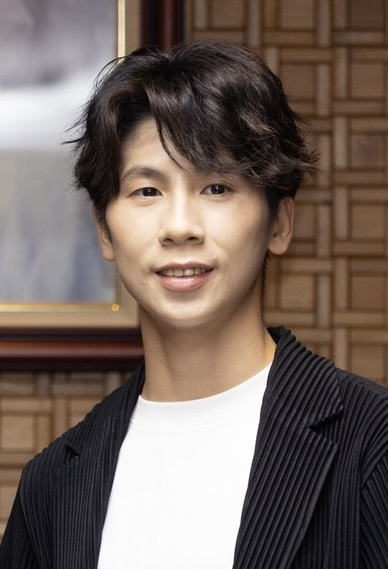
- Imane Khelif (left) and Lin Yu-ting (right), the two female boxers of the controversy
- March 2023: IBA disqualifications of Khelif and Lin at the 2023 Women's World Boxing Championships
- July 2024: IOC affirms Khelif and Lin's eligibility to compete
- August 2024: Khelif and Carini boxing bout

The boxing controversy at the 2024 Summer Olympic Games in Paris involved two female boxers: Algerian Imane Khelif and Lin Yu-Ting of Taiwan. Their eligibility to compete in the women's boxing events at the Paris Olympic Games was questioned after allegedly failing unspecified sex verification tests, a decision that the International Olympic Committee (IOC) subsequently criticised as "sudden and arbitrary".

Both athletes had previously been disqualified from the 2023 IBA Women's World Championships by the Russian-run International Boxing Association (IBA). The IBA claimed the disqualifications were based on unspecified "gender tests", which the International Olympic Committee (IOC) later determined were "completely arbitrary", "illegitimate", and "lacked credibility." In the lead-up to the Paris Games, the IOC cleared both athletes to compete.

The controversy escalated following an August 1 match in Paris, where Khelif faced Italian boxer Angela Carini. After two head blows, Carini withdrew from the match, prompting widespread media speculation about Khelif's gender eligibility.

Although neither Khelif nor Lin are transgender, the controversy became closely linked to broader public debates about trans women's inclusion in women's sports. Several public figures, including then U.S. presidential candidate Donald Trump and author J. K. Rowling, referenced the incident in political commentary about women in sports, often incorrectly suggesting Khelif was male.

National sporting bodies from Algeria and Taiwan issued strong defences of their athletes who were facing harassment over their eligibility as women to compete, while the IOC reaffirmed the two athletes' eligibility.

The incident occurred amid ongoing disputes between the IOC, which oversees the Olympic Games, and the IBA, boxing's long-time global governing body. The IBA had been expelled from the Olympic movement in 2023 due to governance concerns. While broader issues had already strained the relationship, the controversy surrounding Khelif and Lin was cited by some commentators as further illustrating the IBA's governance problems, particularly regarding athlete eligibility procedures.

In March 2026, World Boxing, having taken over as the new international governing body for Olympic-level boxing, cleared Lin to compete in the women's category after she underwent a sex verification test.

== Background ==
=== Previous boxing competitions ===
Prior to the 2024 Olympic Games, both Lin and Khelif had established themselves as prominent competitors in women's boxing. Lin won gold medals in her weight class at the 2018 and 2022 AIBA Women's World Championships, while Khelif secured a silver medal at the 2022 World Championships and a gold medal at the 2022 African Amateur Boxing Championships.

Both athletes also competed at the 2020 Tokyo Olympics, but did not medal, with Khelif reaching the quarterfinal stage.

=== IBA governance issues ===
IBA President Umar Kremlev

The International Boxing Association (IBA), formerly known as AIBA (Association Internationale de Boxe Amateur), has historically served as the international governing body for amateur and professional boxing competitions.

In 2006, Wu Ching-kuo was elected as the president of the association. During the 2010s under Wu's leadership, the organisation came under increasing scrutiny, with widespread allegations of financial mismanagement, political interference, and irregularities in judging. These concerns culminated in the International Olympic Committee (IOC) suspending its recognition of the IBA in 2019, citing serious governance failures and a lack of transparency. In response, the association issued lifetime bans to Wu Ching-kuo and elected Gafur Rakhimov as the new president in November 2018. In 2020, Umar Kremlev was elected as president of the IBA.

Under Kremlev's leadership, the organisation faced further criticism over alleged Russian state influence. Observers pointed to the IBA's sponsorship arrangements with Gazprom, a Russian state-owned energy company, and raised concerns about the independence of its governance and decision-making processes.

In June 2023, after repeated warnings and failed reform efforts, the IOC voted to formally expel the IBA from the Olympic movement. In its decision, the IOC cited serious problems with the IBA's governance, highlighting particular concerns about political interference, financial control, and the integrity of officiating and judging at international boxing events.

=== Disqualifications at the 2023 IBA Women's World Boxing Championships ===
During the IBA Women's World Boxing Championships in March 2023, both Lin and Khelif were disqualified by the IBA mid-tournament after allegedly failing to meet eligibility criteria related to gender verification.

Imane Khelif competed for the gold medal in the finals. However, she was disqualified shortly before her gold medal bout against People's Republic of China boxer Yang Liu. This disqualification happened three days after Khelif defeated Azalia Amineva, a previously unbeaten Russian prospect, restoring the Russian boxer's undefeated record. The IBA claimed the disqualifications were based on unspecified "gender tests", which the International Olympic Committee (IOC) later determined were "completely arbitrary", "illegitimate", and "lacked credibility." Uzbekistani boxer Navbakhor Khamidova was awarded the bronze medal over Khelif.

In 2023, Umar Kremlev, president of the IBA, claimed that the disqualifications had occurred because DNA tests "proved they had XY chromosomes". The Washington Post stated, "It remains unclear what standards Khelif and Lin Yu-ting failed [in 2023] to lead to the disqualifications", adding "There never has been evidence that [...] Khelif [...] had XY chromosomes or elevated levels of testosterone." The IBA did not reveal the testing methodology, stating the "specifics remain confidential". At the time, Khelif said the ruling meant having "characteristics that mean I can't box with women", but said she was the victim of a "big conspiracy" regarding the disqualification. She initially appealed to the Court of Arbitration for Sport but the appeal was terminated since Khelif couldn't pay the procedural costs.

== Eligibility for the 2024 Olympic Games ==
In late July 2024, both Lin and Khelif were officially deemed eligible to compete at the 2024 Summer Olympic Games by the International Olympic Committee (IOC). In a statement, the IOC said "All athletes participating in the boxing tournament of the Olympic Games Paris 2024 comply with the competition's eligibility and entry regulations, as well as all applicable medical regulations in accordance with rules 1.4 and 3.1 of the Paris 2024 Boxing Unit."

The announcement attracted widespread attention and criticism online. Shortly after the IOC's announcement, the International Boxing Association (IBA) issued a statement criticising the decision, citing concerns around the IOC's handling of competitive fairness and athlete safety. The IBA reaffirmed its March 2023 decision to disqualify Lin and Khelif from the 2023 Women's World Boxing Championships, citing the athletes' failure to meet the eligibility criteria for women's competition. The IBA clarified that Khelif and Lin "did not undergo a testosterone examination but were subject to a separate and recognized test, whereby the specifics remain confidential", and further alleged that they "were found to have competitive advantages over other female competitors".

The following day, the IOC released their own statement in response, stating that the IBA's decision was "sudden and arbitrary" and "without any due process". The IOC further stated:

According to the IBA minutes available on their website, this decision was initially taken solely by the IBA Secretary General and CEO. The IBA Board only ratified it afterward and only subsequently requested that a procedure to follow in similar cases in the future be established and reflected in the IBA Regulations. The minutes also say that the IBA should "establish a clear procedure on gender testing".

The IOC has suggested that the 2023 disqualifications may have been politically motivated, particularly in Khelif's case, as her removal followed a victory over a Russian boxer. This allegation emerged amid broader criticisms of the IBA's leadership under Kremlev and the organisation's alleged close ties to Russian state interests.

== Imane Khelif match against Angela Carini and immediate aftermath ==
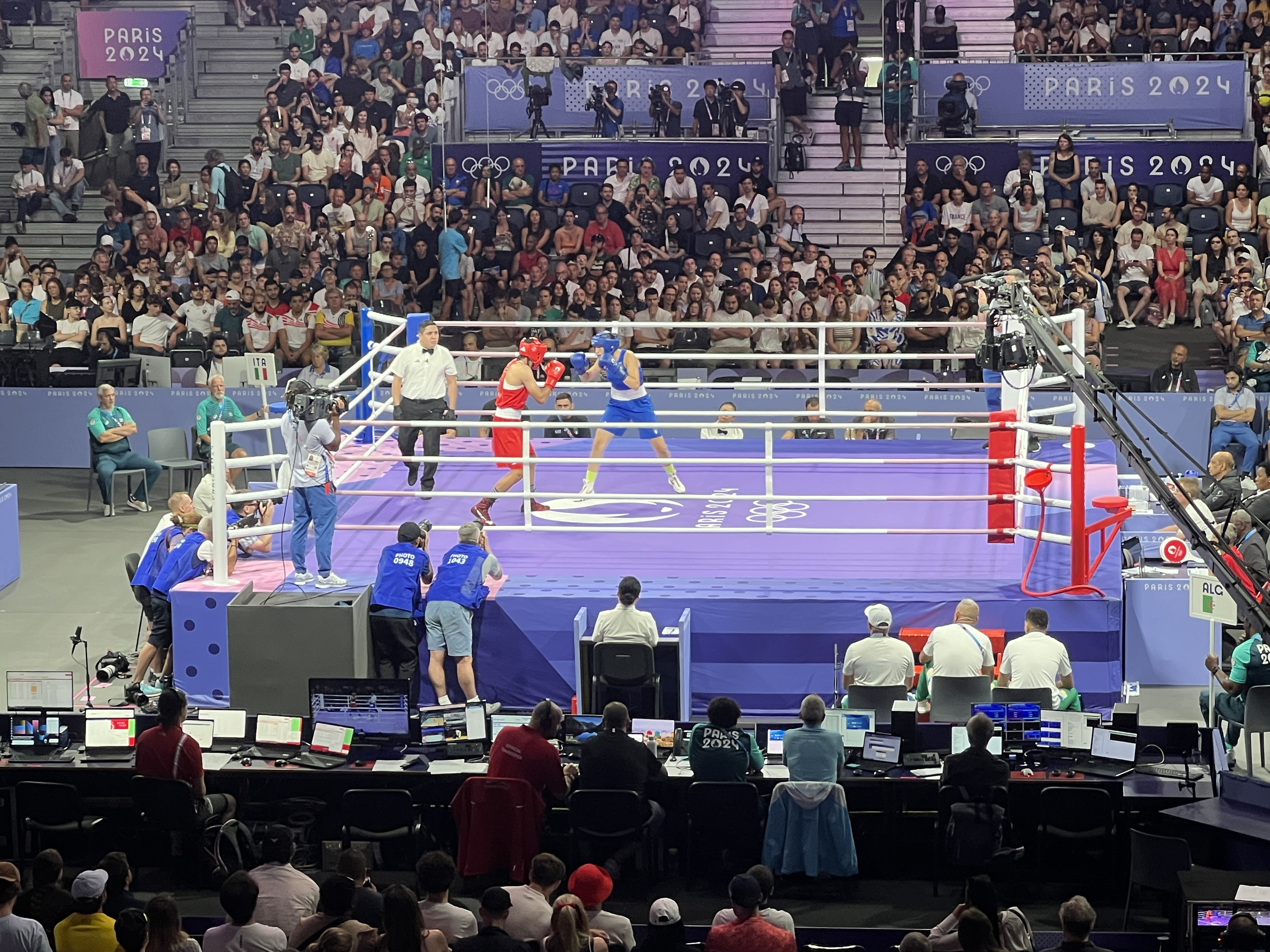
Imane Khelif and Angela Carini on 1 August 2024

On 1 August 2024, Imane Khelif competed against Italian boxer Angela Carini in the women's boxing welterweight division at the Paris Olympic Games. Forty-six seconds into the match, following two head blows delivered by Khelif, Carini withdrew from the bout and appeared visibly distressed. She declined to shake hands with Khelif, a gesture that drew immediate media attention. Speaking to reporters later, Carini stated that she had "never felt a punch like this," prompting widespread speculation about the nature of Khelif's strength and gender eligibility.

The match quickly became the subject of intense online debate. Several public figures, including J. K. Rowling, Elon Musk and Logan Paul, commented on the incident, incorrectly claiming that Khelif was biologically male or transgender. Misinformation circulated rapidly across social media platforms, with posts often misrepresenting Khelif's background and eligibility status.

On 2 August, the IOC released an official statement affirming that both Khelif and Lin were women eligible to compete, according to their passports and their histories competing in women's boxing. The IOC also reiterated that the disqualifications at the 2023 IBA Women's World Championships had been conducted without due process, criticising the IBA's approach in handling the matter as "contrary to good governance". IOC President Thomas Bach went further to describe the backlash against the athletes as part of a "politically motivated... culture war". He linked the issue to a wider, Russian-led campaign against the IOC and the Olympic movement. The IOC expressed support for both athletes, denouncing the harassment, hate speech, and misinformation they had faced online and in the media.

In the days following the match, Carini clarified that her decision not to shake hands had not been intentional and expressed regret over the way the bout had been portrayed. She further stated that she did not believe Khelif had acted improperly during the competition.

The Algerian Olympic Committee issued several statements affirming Khelif's eligibility and criticising what they described as "baseless attacks" and "unethical targeting" on her reputation. Algerian officials emphasised that Khelif had passed all required eligibility checks conducted by the International Olympic Committee (IOC) and accused some foreign media outlets and commentators of engaging in "baseless propaganda." In a statement posted to X, Algerian Sports Minister Abderrahmane Hammad said "Our great Iman Khelif is under attack from an organization that has no legitimacy with IOC. Incredible resources are used to legally pursue and hold accountable anyone who dares to threaten or defame her."

== Public controversy and critical discourse ==
=== Public reaction and misinformation ===
Although neither Lin nor Khelif are transgender, the controversy surrounding their participation in the Paris Olympics became closely associated with broader culture wars over transgender inclusion in sports. Public discourse conflated questions of the two athletes' gender eligibility with debates about transgender athletes.

Online misinformation contributed significantly to the visibility and intensity of the controversy. Social media posts misidentifying Khelif as transgender or biologically male circulated widely. 2024 U.S. presidential candidate Trump used the controversy to reinforce election campaign rhetoric advocating for restrictions on women's sports participation based on assigned sex at birth, while author J. K. Rowling described the situation as emblematic of a "new men's rights movement" displacing women.

=== Critical discourse ===
Commentators have noted the harm to the individual athletes involved, who have been forced to have their personal medical histories discussed in the public arena.

Scholars have also observed that the accusations directed at Khelif reflect a broader pattern in which athletes with variations in sexual characteristics are more likely to face scrutiny under gender eligibility rules, often in ways that reinforce narrow definitions of womanhood. Critics have noted that while organising sport along binary gender lines has helped preserve space for women's athletic achievements, it often disadvantages athletes who fall outside dominant perceptions of how female athletes should look or perform. Such challenges have particularly affected women of colour from the Global South. The episode has drawn comparisons to previous controversies in elite women's sports involving Caster Semenya and Dutee Chand, athletes with differences in sex development (DSDs) who were subjected to eligibility challenges and public scrutiny.

== Athlete perspectives ==
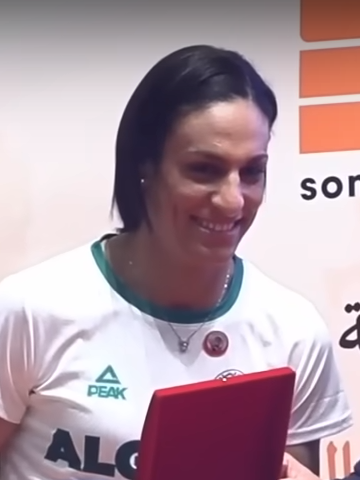
Imane Khelif

=== Imane Khelif ===
Khelif has made several public statements defending her eligibility and speaking about the personal toll of the controversy. During the Games, Khelif spoke about the scrutiny and pressure she faced following the match against Carini: "This has effects, massive effects. It can destroy people, it can kill people's thoughts, spirit and mind. It can divide people. And because of that, I ask them to refrain from bullying."

On 9 August, after winning the gold medal in the women's welterweight (66 kg) boxing category, Khelif reaffirmed her eligibility: "I am fully qualified to take part in this competition. I'm a woman like any other woman. I was born a woman, I lived a woman, I competed as a woman, there's no doubt about that. [The detractors] are enemies of success, that is what I call them. And that also gives my success a special taste because of these attacks."

On 13 August 2024, Khelif filed a complaint with French authorities, alleging aggravated cyber harassment against a number of public figures who had posted to social media platform X (formerly Twitter), naming J. K. Rowling and Elon Musk specifically. In November 2024, Khelif also took legal action against French media, which had published claims that Khelif had XY chromosomes.

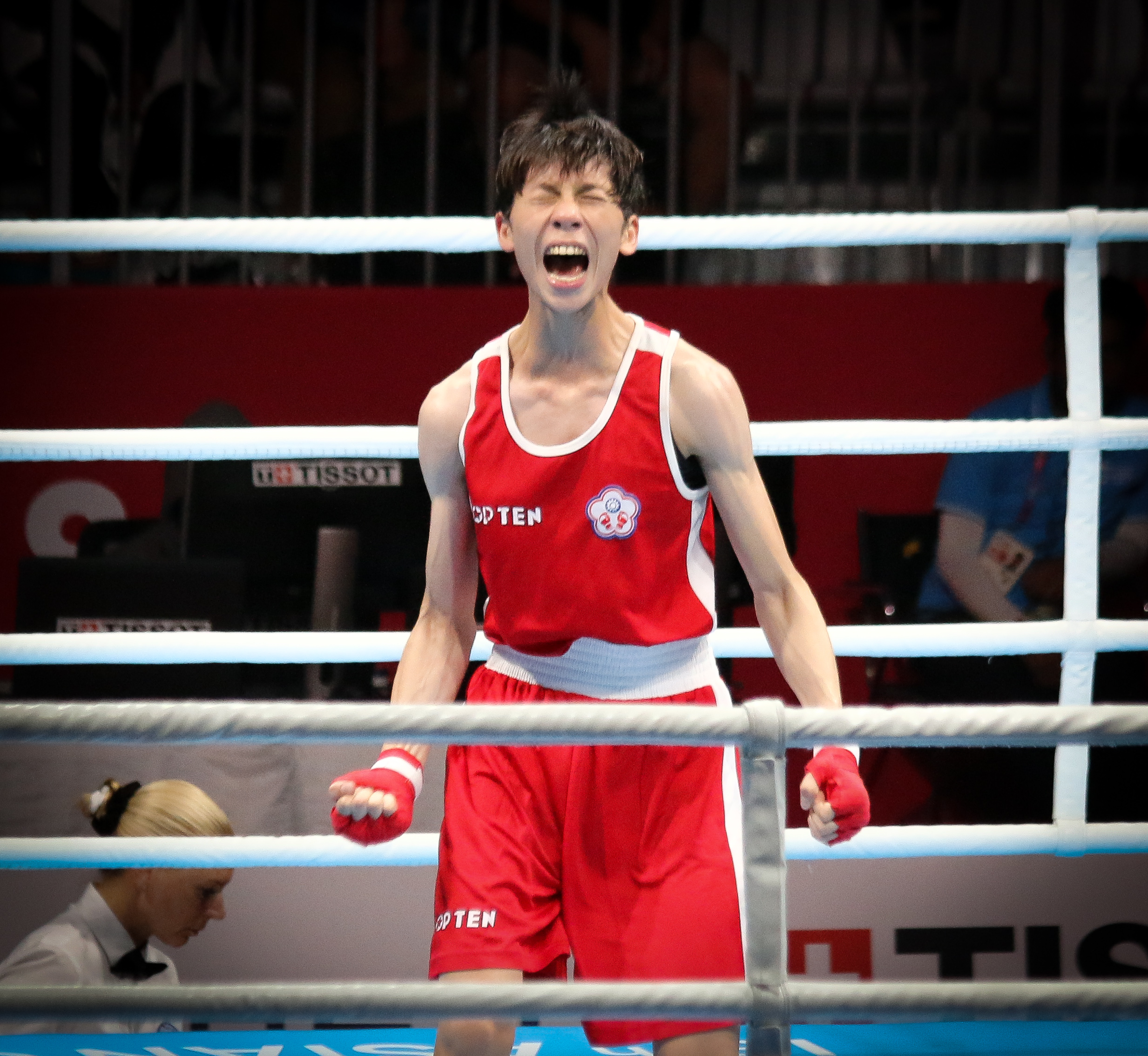
Lin Yu-Ting

=== Lin Yu-Ting ===
Lin has also commented on public scrutiny about her gender. "[My appearance] draws a lot of attention. Sometimes when I go to the restroom, I get asked 'Is that the right one?' Then I would tell them I'm a woman... I can't control what others say... I don't have to cater to stereotypes."

During the Games, Lin largely avoided addressing the eligibility controversy and deactivated her social media after her first Olympic bout. Speaking about the topic after winning the gold medal in her category, Lin stated: "As an elite athlete, during the competition it's important to shut myself off from social media and focus. Of course I heard some of the information through my coach but I didn't pay too much mind to it. I was invited by the IOC to participate in the games and this is what I focused on."

== Impact on IOC-IBA Relations ==
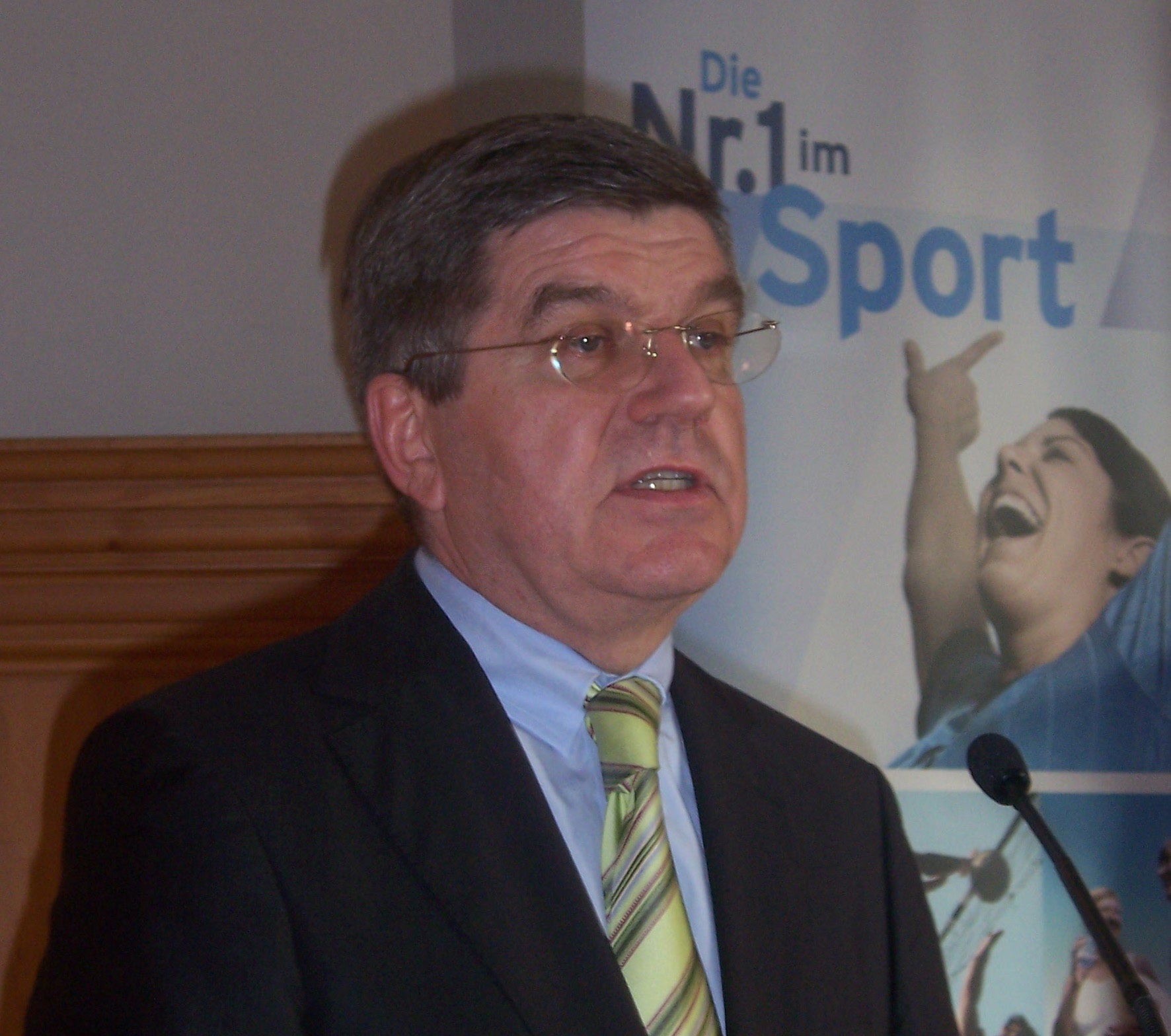
IOC President Thomas Bach

The controversy involving Khelif and Lin occurred amid ongoing tensions between the International Olympic Committee (IOC) and the International Boxing Association (IBA). The relationship between the two organisations had been strained since 2019, when the IOC suspended its recognition of the IBA due to concerns over governance, financial mismanagement, and irregularities in refereeing and judging.

The disqualifications of Khelif and Lin during the 2023 IBA Women's World Championships became a key point of contention between the two organisations. In the lead-up to the 2024 Paris Games, the IBA objected to the IOC's decision to allow both athletes to compete despite their earlier disqualifications. In response, the IOC stated that the disqualifications had been carried out without due process and were not in line with established medical or eligibility standards. In a public statement, IOC President Thomas Bach also referred to the IBA's criticisms of Khelif and Lin as stemming from a "fake news campaign from Russia."

=== IBA complaint to Swiss Attorney General ===
In February 2025, following the issuance of U.S. President Donald Trump's Executive Order 14201, titled "Keeping Men Out of Women's Sports," the IBA filed a complaint with the Office of the Attorney General of Switzerland (OAG). The complaint contested the IOC's decision to allow Khelif and Lin to compete at the Paris Olympics, alleging that the IOC had disregarded eligibility criteria and undermined athlete safety.

== World Boxing ==
Shortly after the IBA was expelled from the Olympic Movement in 2023, some members broke away to form World Boxing. Between 2023 and 2025, the organisation had hoped to be the IBA's replacement as international governing body for boxing.

During the Paris Games, the IOC reiterated that the IBA's recognition has been withdrawn and stated that national boxing federations would need to identify an alternative governing body for boxing to remain on the programme at the 2028 Los Angeles Olympic Games.

In March 2025, the IOC provisionally recognised World Boxing. The IOC also confirmed that boxing would be included on the programme for the 2028 Olympic Games, with World Boxing provisionally serving as the Olympics' recognised international federation for boxing.

=== Lin withdrawal from World Boxing Cup Finals 2024 ===
In November 2024, Lin pulled out of competing at the World Boxing Cup Finals in Sheffield, England, following questions from organisers over her gender eligibility.

Taiwan's Sports Administration stated that Lin met all eligibility criteria and had been cleared by the IOC to compete in Paris, but that World Boxing had raised new questions regarding her eligibility. They criticised World Boxing for lacking clear regulatory protections and for failing to implement adequate confidentiality procedures to safeguard Lin's medical information. According to their statement, Lin offered to undergo a medical examination in the UK, but the proposal was not accepted. To prevent further reputational harm, Lin and her team chose to withdraw from the event.

=== Post-Paris reforms to gender eligibility policies ===
In March 2025, World Boxing's president, Boris van der Vorst, announced that recommendations from a formal investigation into the gender eligibility controversy that arose during the Paris Olympics were expected "soon". He confirmed that a working group, in coordination with the organisation's medical committee, was developing a comprehensive policy on sex, age, and weight eligibility, drawing on expert input from around the world.

In May, World Boxing's executive board released updated rules mandating sex testing for all athletes, stating "Athletes that are deemed to be male at birth, as evidenced by the presence of Y chromosome... or with a difference of sexual development (DSD) where male androgenization occurs, will be eligible to compete in the male category. Athletes that are deemed to be female at birth... or with a DSD where male androgenization does not occur, will be eligible to compete in the female category."

=== Lin's return to women's boxing ===
In March 2026, World Boxing cleared Lin to compete in women's boxing events after she underwent a sex verification test, stating that its medical committee had "considered and evaluated the medical documentation presented and determined that the boxer was deemed to be female and eligible to compete in the female category". The Chinese Taipei Boxing Association described the decision as a "tremendous relief" for Lin, and announced her intention to compete at the impending Asian Boxing Championships, held in Mongolia between 29 March and 10 April.
