= World Boxing Futures Cup =

Amateur boxing competition

- Status: Active
- Genre: Boxing World Cup
- Frequency: Annually
- Years active: 2026–present
- Inaugurated: 2026
- Previous event: 2026
- Next event: 2027
- Organiser: World Boxing
- Website: Website

The World Boxing Futures Cup is an amateur boxing competition organised by World Boxing. It consists of male and female boxers under-19 years old to accruing ranking points over stages of the tournament during the year.

== Editions ==
Year	Host	Dates	Ref
2026	(Thailand) Bangkok	6 – 15 March	

== Medal table ==
- After 2026 edition.

Rank	Nation	Gold	Silver	Bronze	Total
1	Uzbekistan	4	5	2	11
2	Kazakhstan	4	4	3	11
3	United States	4	1	4	9
4	India	1	3	1	5
5	Ukraine	1	2	0	3
6	France	1	1	2	4
7	Japan	1	1	1	3
8	Georgia	1	0	2	3
9	England	1	0	1	2
9	Italy	1	0	1	2
9	Samoa	1	0	1	2
12	Kyrgyzstan	0	1	2	3
13	Thailand	0	1	0	1
13	Tuvalu	0	1	0	1
15	Morocco	0	0	4	4
16	China	0	0	3	3
17	Mexico	0	0	2	2
17	Romania	0	0	2	2
17	Turkmenistan	0	0	2	2
17	Vietnam	0	0	2	2
21	Netherlands	0	0	1	1
21	New Zealand	0	0	1	1
21	North Korea	0	0	1	1
21	Senegal	0	0	1	1
21	South Korea	0	0	1	1
Totals (25 entries)		20	20	40	80
