= Croatian Boxing Federation =

Boxing federation in Croatia

- Sport: Boxing
- Founded: 1921
- Affiliation: World Boxing
- Regional affiliation: Europe
- President: Bono Bošnjak
- Vice president(s): General Mladen Mikolčević
- Secretary: Nikolina Jurić

Official website
- www.boks-savez.hr
- (Croatia)

The Croatian Boxing Federation (Croatian: Hrvatski boksački savez) is the governing body of Olympic boxing in Croatia. It was established in 1921.

It is a member organization of the Croatian Olympic Committee.
