= Norwegian Boxing Federation =

Boxing governing body in Norway

Norwegian Boxing Federation Norwegian Norges Bokseforbund
- Sport: Amateur boxing
- Abbreviation: NBF
- Founded: 1967
- Affiliation: World Boxing
- Affiliation date: 2025
- Regional affiliation: Europe
- Headquarters: Oslo
- President: Vibeke Thiblin
- (Norway)

The Norwegian Boxing Federation (Norwegian Norges Bokseforbund - NBF) is the national federation of boxing in Norway. It organised its first Norwegian Championship in 1909, and the first Norwegian to win an Olympic gold medal was Otto Von Porat in the heavyweight category in 1924.

The president is Vibeke Thiblin (since 2009) and the vice-president is Harald Monsen. The Norwegian Boxing Federation was founded in 1967. The organisation's headquarters are in Oslo. It is an affiliate of World Boxing.

== Organization ==
- President: Vibeke Thiblin
- Vice-president: Harald Monsen
