= Nepal Boxing Federation =

National governing body for boxing in Nepal

The Boxing Federation of Nepal
- Sport: Boxing
- Jurisdiction: (Nepal) National
- Abbreviation: NBF
- Founded: 1976
- Affiliation: World Boxing
- Affiliation date: 24 January 2025
- Headquarters: National sports center, Satdobato, Lalitpur, Nepal
- President: Ram Awale
- Secretary: Man Bahadur Bhandari

Official website
- nepalboxingassociation.com
- (Nepal)

Nepal Boxing Federation (NBF) is the Nepalese national governing body for amateur boxing for Olympic and is the Nepal's member organization of World Boxing. It is headquartered in Satdobato, Lalitpur.

NBF annually organizes different regional and national level championships, which became useful to identify and nurture new talents.

Recently Nepal School Sports Federation signed MOUs with almost every National Sport Associations across country which is slowing but steadily started to show the results.

== District Association ==
NBF has its affiliated Associations in almost every district across Nepal. Some of the associations are listed below:

- Bhaktapur District Boxing Association
- Jhapa District Boxing Association
- Kathmandu District Boxing Association
- Kaski District Boxing Association - KBA
- Lalitpur District Boxing Association
- Nawalparasi District Boxing Association
- Sindhuli District Boxing Association
- Sunsari District Boxing Association

== See also ==
- Deepak Maharjan
- Dal Bahadur Ranamagar
