= Iraq national amateur boxing athletes =

Iraq national amateur boxing athletes represents Iraq in regional, continental and world boxing tournaments and matches sanctioned by World Boxing.

== Olympics ==
=== 2004 Athens Olympics ===
Iraq was represented by one boxer in this edition of the Olympiad, in the Light flyweight division. He won his first bout but was defeated in the second.

==== Entry list ====
Light Flyweight - Najah Ali

== Asian Games ==
=== 2006 Doha Asian Games ===
Five boxers represented Iraq in this edition of the Asiad. Three of the five athletes made it to the quarterfinals but none succeeded in pushing through the semifinals, leaving Iraq ranked 15th in boxing.

==== Entry list ====
- Featherweight - MAHDI Suraka
- Flyweight - MUTUSHR Majeed
- Light Flyweight - NAJAH Ali
- Light Welterweight - ZUHIR Jabar
- Heavyweight - ALI Salman
