= Nigeria Boxing Federation =

Nigeria governing body for boxing

The Nigeria Boxing Federation (NBF) is the governing body responsible for overseeing and regulating boxing activities in Nigeria. It is affiliated with the Nigeria Olympic Committee and is a member of World Boxing based in Lausanne, Switzerland and as well as Nigeria Boxing Board of Control (NBB of C)., NBB of C is an NGO registered under the Corporate affairs commission of Nigeria and not qualified to administer or regulate Boxing in Nigeria, NBF is the only body recognised by the Laws of Nigeria.

The interim president of the NBF is Azania Omo-Agege.
