= Boxing Association of Korea =

Sports governing body in South Korea

The Boxing Association of Korea (BAK) is an affiliated organization of the Korean Olympic Committee and World Boxing. Its mission is the development and dissemination of amateur boxing in South Korea. BAK was founded in 1934 under the name of the Chosun Amateur Boxing Association.
