= Lao national amateur boxing athletes =

Lao national amateur boxing athletes represents Lao Democratic People's Republic in regional, continental and world matches and tournaments sanctioned by World Boxing.

== Southeast Asian Games ==
=== 2005 Manila Southeast Asian Games ===
Seven male and two female amateur boxers competed in the 2005 Southeast Asian Games in Manila. Marivone Phimsompttu won bronze medal in the women's bantamweight division. Two males from the Pinweight and Bantamweight divisions settled for bronze medals.

==== Entry list ====
Male

- Sikham Vongphakhoune (Pinweight) - Bronze
- Sayyaphone Chanthasone Light Flyweight
- Nhothin Holapatiphone Flyweight
- Xayyalak Chanthasone Bantamweight - Bronze
- Sathit Keo Inta Featherweight
- Udone Khanxay Lightweight
- Nilondon Tanovanh Light Welterweight

Female

- Chinda Maniphanh (Flyweight)
- Marivone Phimsomphou (Bantamweight) - Bronze

== Asian Games ==
=== 2006 Doha Asian Games ===
Three amateur boxers represented Lao DPR in this edition of the Asiad. None of the three boxers qualified for the quarterfinal rounds. Lao DPR is ranked 15th overall in boxing.

==== Entry list ====
- Nhothin Holapatiphone (Flyweight)
- Sathit Keo Inhta (Featherweight)
- Udone Khanxay (Lightweight)
