= Annie Newton =

English boxer

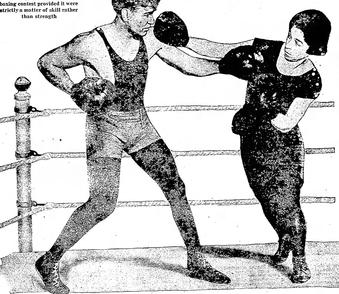
- Annie Newton depicted with a male opponent.

Personal information
- Nationality: British
- Born: 1893
- Died: 1955
- Occupation: Boxer
- Height: 5 ft (152 cm)
- Weight: 108 lb (49 kg)

Annie Newton was London's first and principal woman boxer, claimed during her time to be “the greatest woman boxer in the world."

== Boxing career ==
Newton was the niece of ‘Professor’ Andrew Newton, lightweight boxing champion (1888-1890) and boxing instructor.

She was unwell as a child. Following a visit to her uncle's gymnasium he was shocked by her pale appearance and began to train her to improve her health, which she later claimed saved her from an early death. He taught her to punch the bag and later, “for his amusement”, to spar.

From the age of 10, she appeared in stage shows and fairground tents sparring with men, raising money for various charities. She reportedly boxed every day for fourteen years.

After losing two husbands in the First World War, she was left to raise her daughter Daisy alone as a widow. In order to financially support her family she gave boxing lessons to men in her uncle's London gymnasium. She was eager to teach women, but found very few were willing to take up the sport. During the 1920s, Professor Andrew Newton formed a Women's Boxing Club in London, of which Annie Newton was the most famous member.

In June 1925, she took part in a boxing tournament at the Alcazar, Edmonton. She was in the ring for over half an hour sparring with three men, giving them two rounds each.

She could bunch a bag 900 times without missing.

== 'Women Boxers' Scandal ==
On Monday 8 February 1926, an exhibition match of six rounds was arranged at the Hoxton Baths between Newton and Madge Baker. Baker was the other woman boxer in England and a student of Digger Stanley. The promoter, Harry Abrahams, later stated that it was not billed as a contest but was meant to be a novelty.

News of the event caused outrage and protest. Plans were made to summon a 'town's indignation meeting' of local representatives with the aim of preventing the match. The campaign to stop the match was led by the Mayor of Hackney, Rev. W. Evans, who wrote to the Daily News "I regard this proposed exhibition of women boxers as a gratification of the sensual ideals of a crowd of vulgar men." Evans appealed to the Home Secretary Sir William Joynson-Hicks. The Home Secretary replied "I should have no power to interfere, mainly, I think, because the Legislature never imagined that such a disgraceful exhibition would have been staged in this country...I hope and trust that the influence of decent public opinion will prevent such an outrage taking place."

The event was banned by the Shoreditch Borough Council. The only vote in favour of the bout going ahead came from a woman member who stated “that if the girls wanted to maul each other, she thought it was perfectly all right”.

Attempts were made to hold the match on 14 February at Manor Hall, Hackney. Rev. W. Evans wrote to the management to prevent this event from taking place. On hearing the match was again postponed, Newton stated “I'm terribly upset about it. I have been looking forward to the match for a long time and got myself in first-rate condition.” She offered to instead meet three male boxers in two-round bouts, but this too was cancelled, and Newton was only allowed to give an exhibition of her skill with the punchball. In a short speech from the ring, Newton expressed her disappointment.

Newton, who had been publicly sparring all her life without objection, was surprised by and couldn't understand the public outcry. She countered concerns about women boxing, telling a reporter “All this talk about boxing being ‘degrading’ and ‘risky’ and ‘too hard work’ strikes me as very comic. Is it any more degrading, or half as hard work as scrubbing floors? Is it any more risky than working in a munitions factory[?]”

The story was reported internationally, sometimes as a source of amusement.

Reports suggest the original match went ahead surreptitiously.

Despite the scandal, Newton remained defiant “In a way, of course, the decision will make no difference, because I shall go on with my sparring partners and enjoy myself no end. I could not give it up for anything in the world.” She predicted “while I may not see it, or you either, the day will come, like it or not, when the world will see women in the ring.”
