= World Boxing =

International boxing governing body

- Abbreviation: WB
- Formation: 13 April 2023; 3 years ago
- Founded at: Lausanne, Switzerland
- Type: International sport federation
- Legal status: Governing body of amateur (Olympic-style) boxing
- Headquarters: Avenue de Rhodanie 2 – CP 975 1001, Lausanne, Switzerland
- Members: 185 national federations
- President: Gennady Golovkin
- Vice-president(s): Ryan O’Shea; Matt Holt; Dinah Glykidis
- Main organ: Congress
- Subsidiaries: Asian Boxing; Pan American Boxing Confederation; European Boxing; Oceania Boxing
- Affiliations: International Olympic Committee; ASOIF
- Website: worldboxing.org

World Boxing is an international sports governing body for amateur (Olympic-style) boxing. Formed on 13 April 2023, it currently consists of 185 member federations. It is recognized by the International Olympic Committee as the international governing body for boxing, and will sanction boxing at the Summer Olympics beginning in 2028.

The organisation was formed in response to ongoing governance and integrity issues facing the International Boxing Association (IBA), which had resulted in its suspension—and later, expulsion—from the IOC. Its charter members were drawn from the Common Cause Alliance, a group of IBA members that had demanded transparency over the organisation's governance and finances amid the presidency of Umar Kremlev and the Russian invasion of Ukraine, and campaigned for maintaining boxing as an Olympic sport. In February 2025, the IOC granted provisional recognition to World Boxing after meeting benchmarks for reach and integrity; the following month, the IOC approved the reinstatement of boxing on the Olympic programme.

== History ==
=== Common Cause Alliance ===
The International Boxing Association had been suspended by the IOC in 2019 due to issues surrounding its governance and finances. Further scrutiny emerged under the presidency of Umar Kremlev—which began in 2020—including allegations of increased Russian influence (including close ties to president Vladimir Putin, a sponsorship agreement with state-owned oil company Gazprom, and having moved some of its operations to Russia), and continued concerns over governance, finances, and the integrity of officiating.

Amid the Russian invasion of Ukraine in 2022, 18 boxing national federations formed a consortium known as the "Common Cause Alliance" (CCA), which called for greater transparency on its finances (including the aforementioned Gazprom agreement), determine the detrimental effects of the invasion on the IBA, and for it to take stronger action against the Russian Boxing Federation. The CCA also pledged support for boxing to continue being a Summer Olympic sport.

During the IBA Congress in May 2022, one day before a presidential vote, five candidates connected to the CCA were deemed ineligible by IBA's Interim Nomination Unit, accusing them of engaging in prohibited "collaborations" and campaigning outside of the designated period. One of the candidates—Dutch official Boris van der Vorst—filed for an appeal with the Court of Arbitration for Sport (CAS), stating that the candidates had been approved by the IBA's Disciplinary Committee, which had also approved the CCA's activities as being supportive of the IBA's mission. The CAS overruled the IBA decision, resulting in an Extraordinary IBA Congress in September; however, the IBA's members voted against van der Vorst's proposal to challenge Kremlev's re-election. By December 2022, the membership of the Common Cause Alliance had grown to 25 federations.

=== World Boxing ===
In April 2023, the IOC stated that it needed to have a partner International Federation for boxing by early 2025, otherwise the sport's presence at the 2028 Summer Olympics would be at risk. On 13 April 2023, World Boxing was launched as a competitor to the IBA, with its interim board including officials from member organizations of the CCA, and van der Vorst named inaugural president. The IBA condemned World Boxing as a "rogue organization" whose sole purpose was to destroy the IBA's integrity, and threatened sanctions against national federations, athletes, and officials who participate in its events.

On 22 June 2023, the IOC Executive Board voted to permanently withdraw its recognition of the IBA, citing a continued lack of progress on governance, finances, and addressing corruption since its original suspension. On 7 May 2024, World Boxing held its first formal meeting with the IOC, discussing the future of Olympic boxing, and the criteria that would have to be met for the IOC to consider a proposal to recognize World Boxing as the governing body for boxing.

On 15 May 2024, an exclusive deal was made for US company Nike Boxing to supply sporting apparel and footwear to World Boxing.

On 26 September 2024, it was announced that Kazakhstani Olympic medallist Gennady Golovkin would lead World Boxing's Olympic Commission, serving as a liaison between World Boxing and the IOC on matters relating to Olympic boxing.

On 2 October 2024, World Boxing announced a four-year agreement to delegate drug testing activities to the International Testing Agency (ITA). On 10 October 2024, World Boxing agreed to delegate adjudication on all anti-doping violations to the Anti-Doping Division of the Court of Arbitration for Sport (CAS AAD).

In November 2024, the majority of the Asian Boxing Confederation (ASBC) voted to remain part of the IBA. ASBC President Pichai Chunhavajira resigned after the meeting. In December 2024, Asian Boxing was formed with Chunhavajira elected to head the organization. In January 2025, a Pan American Boxing Confederation was established by the 17 national federations from the Americas that were members of World Boxing at that time.

On 24 February 2025, World Boxing announced an agreement with Exceed Boxing to manage its events and the organisation's commercial rights (such as sponsorships and broadcast rights).

On February 25, 2025, World Boxing was admitted as a member of the Alliance of Independent Recognized Members of Sport (AIMS), after an Extraordinary Assembly to discuss several key developments.

On 26 February 2025, the IOC announced that it had granted provisional recognition to World Boxing as an international federation for boxing, citing its ongoing progress on membership reach and commitments to competitive integrity; van der Vorst stated that "there is still a lot of work to do, and everyone is as committed as ever to continuing to work together and doing everything within our power to deliver a better future for our sport and ensuring that boxing remains at heart of the Olympic movement."

On 10 March 2025, World Boxing was granted provisional membership of the Association of IOC Recognised International Sports Federations (ARISF), pending ratification by the ARISF general assembly.

On March 15, 2025, Pan American Boxing Confederation held its Inaugural Congress in Panama City, Panama, where the following leadership team was elected:

- President: Elise Seignolle (USA)
- Vice Presidents: Ryan O'Shea (Canada), Tomas Cianca (Panama)
- Directors: Marcos Brito (Brazil), Stephen Jones (Jamaica), Kathy Harper-Hall (Barbados), Dhany Reyes (Honduras)
- Chair Audit & Finance Committee & Treasurer: Amabelis Camano (Panama)
- Chair Sport & Competition Committee: Hernan Salvo (Argentina)
- Chair Medical & Anti-doping: Bernardino Santi (Brazil)

On 17 March 2025, the IOC Executive Board recommended the reinstatement of boxing on the 2028 Summer Olympic programme, with sanctioning from World Boxing. On 20 March 2025, during the 144th IOC Session in Greece, the IOC's members ratified the recommendations of the Executive Board, thus officially reinstating boxing as a Summer Olympic event.

On 24 March 2025, European Boxing held its inaugural Congress in Prague, where Lars Brovil from the Danish Boxing Association was elected president.

In April 2025, the IOC announced that one additional women's weight class would be added to boxing for parity with the men's events, bringing the total to 14 medal events at the 2028 Olympics.

In May 2025, the organisation faced criticism for specifically naming Algerian boxer Imane Khelif in an announcement of mandatory sex verification testing via PCR test for all boxers 18 and older in World Boxing-sanctioned events; she had faced controversy during the 2024 Summer Olympics over allegations—themselves based on disputed testing by the IBA—that she had XY chromosomes. Reuters reported that van der Vorst had personally apologised to the Algeria Boxing Federation for the specific reference to Khelif, arguing that it violated her privacy.

World Boxing was admitted as an associate member of the Association of Summer Olympic International Federations (ASOIF), during the ASOIF‘s 49th General Assembly.

On August 8, 2025, the Pan American Boxing Confederation was officially recognized as a member of the Association of Panamerican Sports Confederations (ACODEPA). The unanimous decision at the General Assembly in Asunción, Paraguay, marked a historic milestone for the sport, as boxing was formally acknowledged under its newly provisionally recognized International Federation and continental confederation. The moment also highlighted the strong leadership and vision of the Confederation’s elected team, who are expected to guide the sport’s growth and development across the continent.

The Ukrainian Boxing Federation's application for membership in World Boxing was approved by the World Boxing Board of Directors on September 3, 2025, and World Boxing announced Ukraine among the eight additional national federations approved for membership on September 23, 2025. The Ukrainian Boxing Federation submitted its application for membership on September 9, 2024, and withdrew from the International Boxing Association (IBA) in February 2025. The membership was subsequently ratified by the World Boxing Congress in 2025.

On October 13, 2025, Oceania Boxing was enstablished, and its Inaugural Congress was held in Fiji where the following leadership team was elected:

- President: Beulah Daunakamakama (Fiji)
- Vice President (1): Phil Goodes (Australia)
- Vice President (2): Tavui Mike Lemisio (Samoa)
- Board Members: Ishmael Tahiata (French Polynesia), Lefau Francis Joseph Ainuu (Samoa), and Ms Manaema Saitala (Tuvalu – subsequently co-opted)
- Chair of Sports and Competition Committee: Scott Bindloss (Kiribati)
- Treasurer (Chair of Audit & Finance Committee): Vacant

One additional Board position remains vacant.

On November 12, 2025, barrister Ian Hunt was assigned the independent position of World Boxing's Ethics Chief.

On November 23, 2025, during its 2025 Congress in Rome, Gennadiy Golovkin was appointed President of World Boxing by unanimous acclamation from the Congress. Although Mariolis Charilaos initially also submitted his candidacy for President in October 2025, Golovkin was the only one cleared to run after a review by an independent Vetting Panel, a group of three external experts, which examined each candidate’s background, leaving Golovkin as the sole candidate for the office of President. Golovkin will serve a three-year term, taking over from Boris van der Vorst of the Netherlands, who chose not to run for another term.

On February 2, 2026, World Boxing chose Tom Dielen as its Secretary General, through an open recruitment process. Dielen previously served World Archery as the Secretary General from 2005-2025.

=== Russia and Belarus suspension ===
On April 28, 2026, World Boxing officially implemented a mandatory Individual Neutral Athlete (AIN) vetting procedure for Russian and Belarusian participants to ensure they have no ties to the military, security forces, or the war in Ukraine. This policy requires National Federations to cover all vetting costs in advance and applies to all Elite-level boxers, coaches, and support staff, though athletes aged U19 or younger are exempt. Background checks will be conducted by an independent third party, with a World Boxing commission making final, non-appealable decisions on eligibility. Russian and Belarusian delegates will not be allowed to participate with their national flags, uniforms or anthems. Effective immediately, this procedure has been formally communicated to the relevant federations to govern all upcoming competitions accordingly.

On 12 May 2026, World Boxing lifted its Individual Neutral Athlete (AIN) restrictions on Belarus with immediate effect, allowing its athletes, coaches, and officials to compete under their own national flag, uniform, and anthem. This decision aligns with a recent recommendation from the International Olympic Committee to restore full competitive status to Belarusian participants. However, these restrictions will remain in place for Russia.

== Tournaments ==
- World Boxing Championships
- World Boxing Cup
- World Boxing Challenge
- World Boxing U19 Championships

=== World Boxing Championships ===
On 17 September 2024, World Boxing announced the M&S Bank Arena in Liverpool, England, would host the organisation's inaugural 2025 World Boxing Championships from 4 to 14 September 2025.

=== World Boxing U19 Championships ===
On 19 June 2024, World Boxing announced the inaugural World Boxing U19 Championships to be held in Pueblo, Colorado from 25 October to 5 November 2024.

== Continental federations ==
- Asian Boxing
- Pan American Boxing Confederation
- European Boxing
- Oceania Boxing

== National federations ==
Member federation: "+GB" indicates GB Boxing, whose catchment area overlaps the Home Nations members.

World Boxing currently has 185 national member federations - 40 from Africa, 37 from the Americas, 41 from Asia, 52 from Europe, and 15 from Oceania.

Membership timeline
Date	Change	Total
9 August 2023	The United States, New Zealand, Australia, Great Britain (GB Boxing), England and the Netherlands were World Boxing's first cohort of members.	6
24 August 2023	Canada, Brazil, Argentina, Germany, Honduras and Sweden joined.	12
12 September 2023	Denmark, Mongolia, Panama and French Polynesia joined.	16
20 October 2023	Finland, Iceland, Jamaica, Nigeria, Norway and Czechia joined.	22
25 October 2023	The Philippines, Scotland, Wales, Suriname and the US Virgin Islands joined.	27
Before 14 April 2024	Tuvalu joined.	28
31 May 2024	India joined.	29
21 June 2024	Barbados, Dominica, Peru and Singapore joined.	33
26 July 2024	Italy, South Korea, Bermuda and the Cayman Islands joined.	37
16 August 2024	Chinese Taipei, Pakistan, Bhutan, Fiji and Ecuador joined.	42
10 September 2024	Japan and Algeria joined.	44
30 October 2024	Andorra, Belgium, Iraq, Lithuania, Madagascar, Kyrgyzstan and Thailand joined.	51
4 November 2024	Guatemala, Laos, Kazakhstan and Uzbekistan joined.	55
12 December 2024	Cambodia, Dominican Republic, Jordan, Myanmar and Palestine joined.	60
24 January 2025	Croatia, France, Iran, Malaysia, Nepal, Poland, Samoa and Turkmenistan joined.	68
4 February 2025	Egypt, The Gambia, Grenada and Kiribati joined.	72
18 February 2025	Kosovo, Syria, Hungary, Malawi, Estonia and Switzerland joined. Hungary was the 75th country to join; the total of 78 federations is higher because Great Britain is represented by both GB Boxing and England, and French Polynesia is not a sovereign country.	78
12 March 2025	China, Turkey, Sudan, Greece, Montenegro and Slovakia joined.	84
27 March 2025	Albania, The Bahamas, Bulgaria, Ghana and Sierra Leone joined.	89
22 May 2025	Afghanistan, Austria, Azerbaijan, Chile, Colombia, Cuba, Ireland, Hong Kong, Lebanon, Mexico, Macao, Mauritius, Spain, Saudi Arabia, Uganda, United Arab Emirates and Venezuela joined.	106
18 June 2025	Bosnia and Herzegovina, Georgia, Indonesia, Romania and Trinidad and Tobago joined.	111
29 July 2025	Bolivia, Central African Republic, El Salvador, Haiti, Israel, Micronesia and Somalia joined.	118
August 2025	Grenada left; it was absent from the membership page as of 7 August 2025.	117
23 September 2025	Kenya, Libya, Nicaragua, North Macedonia, Qatar, Senegal, Slovenia and Ukraine joined.	125
23 November 2025	At Congress 2025 in Rome, 49 applications were ratified as Full Members. The total did not change: 124 federations were Congress-approved (123 Full Members and GB Boxing as Associate Member), and Senegal, which was not ratified, remained an Endorsed Member.	125
16 December 2025	27 new Endorsed Members: Bahrain, Bangladesh, Eswatini, Faroe Islands, Guyana, Lesotho, Luxembourg, Malta, Morocco, Niger, Puerto Rico, Serbia, Seychelles, Togo and Tunisia, announced 16 December, and Botswana, North Korea, Guinea, Latvia, Marshall Islands, Namibia, Nauru, Paraguay, Sri Lanka, Tajikistan, Uruguay and Vietnam, announced 19 December. Senegal, listed with this group in some sources, was already a member since 23 September 2025 and is not counted as new.	152 (123 Full, 1 Associate, 28 Endorsed)
7 January 2026	Armenia, Equatorial Guinea and Portugal joined.	155 (123 Full, 1 Associate, 31 Endorsed)
29 January 2026	Benin, Mali, Moldova and Saint Lucia joined.	159 (123 Full, 1 Associate, 35 Endorsed)
19 March 2026	Belarus, Cyprus, Mozambique, Niue, Papua New Guinea, Russia, Tanzania, Tonga and Zambia joined.	168 (123 Full, 1 Associate, 44 Endorsed)
29 April 2026	Antigua and Barbuda, Cameroon, Curaçao, Gabon, Grenada, South Africa and Vanuatu joined; Grenada rejoined after leaving in 2025.	175 (123 Full, 1 Associate, 51 Endorsed)
8 May 2026	Gibraltar joined (postal vote, 4 May 2026).	176 (123 Full, 1 Associate, 52 Endorsed)
27 May 2026	Cape Verde, Costa Rica, Rwanda and Solomon Islands joined.	180 (123 Full, 1 Associate, 56 Endorsed)
10 August 2026	Chad, Ethiopia, Liberia, Kuwait and Yemen joined; Ecuador's membership was suspended and Cameroon's endorsement was cancelled, so the net change was +3. The endorsement of the Congolese federation, made on 30 July 2026, was also cancelled and was never counted in the total.	183 (122 Full, 1 Associate, 60 Endorsed)
October 2026	Ecuador's suspension was revoked by letter dated 19 October 2026, restoring its Full Member rights; Ethiopia was placed on hold and left the directory (exact date not published). The two changes offset each other.	183 (123 Full, 1 Associate, 59 Endorsed)
26 October 2026	Angola and Burkina Faso were endorsed for membership in 2027, subject to final approval by Congress.	185 (123 Full, 1 Associate, 61 Endorsed)

Africa (African Boxing)	Americas (Pan American Boxing Confederation)	Asia (Asian Boxing)	Europe (European Boxing)	Oceania (Oceania Boxing)
Algeria (Fédération Algérienne de Boxe); Angola (Federação Angolana de Boxe); Benin (Beninese Boxing Federation); Botswana (Botswana Boxing Association); Burkina Faso (Fédération Burkinabè de Boxe); Cape Verde (The Cape Verdean Boxing Federation); Central African Republic (Central African Boxing Federation); Chad (Chad Boxing Federation); Egypt (Egyptian Boxing); Eswatini (Eswatini Boxing Federation); Equatorial Guinea (Boxing Federation of Equatorial Guinea (FEGUIBOX)); Gabon (La Fédération Gabonaise de Boxe); The Gambia (The Gambia National Boxing Association); Ghana (Ghana Boxing Federation); Guinea (Guinean Boxing Federation); Kenya (Boxing Federation of Kenya); Liberia (Liberia Boxing Federation); (Lebanon) Libya (Libyan Boxing Federation); Lesotho (Lesotho Boxing Association); Madagascar (Madagascar Boxing Federation); Malawi (Malawi Boxing Association); Mali (Malian Boxing Federation); Mauritius (Mauritius Boxing Federation); Morocco (Royal Moroccan Boxing Federation); Mozambique (Mozambique Boxing Federation); Namibia (Namibia Boxing Federation); Nigeria (Nigeria Boxing Federation); Niger (Nigerian Boxing Federation (FENIBOXE)); Rwanda (Rwanda Boxing Federation); Senegal (Senegalese Boxing Federation); Seychelles (Seychelles Boxing Federation); Sierra Leone (Sierra Leone Boxing Federation); Somalia (Somali Boxing Association); South Africa (South African National Boxing Organisation); Sudan (Sudan Amateur Boxing Association); Tanzania (Boxing Federation of Tanzania); Togo (Togo Boxing Federation); Tunisia (Tunisia Boxing Federation); Uganda (Uganda Boxing Federation); Zambia (Zambia Boxing Federation)	Antigua and Barbuda (Antigua and Barbuda Boxing Association); Argentina (Argentina Boxing Federation); The Bahamas (Amateur Boxing Federation of the Bahamas); Barbados (Barbados Boxing Association); Bermuda (Bermuda Boxing Federation); Bolivia (Boxing Federation of Bolivia); Brazil (Confederação Brasileira de Boxe); Canada (Boxing Canada); Cayman Islands (Cayman Islands elite Boxing Federation); Chile (Chilean Boxing Federation); Colombia (Colombia Boxing Federation); Costa Rica (Federación de Boxeo de Costa Rica); Cuba (Cuban Boxing Federation); Curaçao (Curaçao Boxing Association); Dominica (Dominica Boxing Association); Dominican Republic (Federacion Dominicana de Boxeo); Ecuador (Ecuadorian Boxing Federation); Grenada (Boxing Association of Grenada Inc); Guyana (Guyana Boxing Association); Guatemala (Federación Nacional de Boxeo de Guatemala); Haiti (Haitian Boxing Federation); Honduras (Federación Hondureña de Boxeo); Jamaica (Jamaica Boxing Board of Control); Mexico (Federación Mexicana De Boxeo); Nicaragua (Nicaraguan Amateur Boxing Federation); Panama (Panamanian Boxing Federation); Paraguay (Paraguayan Boxing and Related Association); Peru (Federacion deportiva Peruana de Boxeo); Puerto Rico (Puerto Rican Boxing Federation); El Salvador (Salvadoran Boxing Federation); Saint Lucia (St. Lucia Boxing Association); Suriname (Surinaamse Boksbond); Trinidad and Tobago (Trinidad & Tobago Boxing Association); United States (USA Boxing); Uruguay (Uruguay Boxing Federation); (United States Virgin Islands) US Virgin Islands (US Virgin Islands Boxing Federation); Venezuela (Venezuela Boxing Federation)	Afghanistan (Afghanistan National Boxing Federation); Bahrain (Bahrain Boxing Federation); Bangladesh (Bangladesh Boxing Federation); Bhutan (Bhutan Boxing Federation); Cambodia (Cambodia Boxing Federation); China (Chinese Boxing Federation); Hong Kong (Boxing Association of Hong Kong); India (Boxing Federation of India); Indonesia (Indonesia Boxing Federation); Iran (Iran national amateur boxing athletes); Iraq (Iraq national amateur boxing athletes); Japan (Japan Boxing Federation); Jordan (Jordan Boxing Association); Kazakhstan (Kazakhstan Boxing Federation); Kuwait (Kuwait Boxing Federation); Kyrgyzstan (Kyrgyz Republic Boxing Federation); Laos (Lao Boxing Federation); Lebanon (Lebanese Boxing Federation); (Macau) Macao (Macao Boxing General Association); Malaysia (Malaysian Boxing Federation); Mongolia (Mongolia Boxing Association); Myanmar (Myanmar Boxing Federation); Nepal (Nepal Boxing Federation); North Korea (DPR Korea Boxing Association); Pakistan (Pakistan Boxing Federation); Palestine (Palestine Boxing Federation); Philippines (Association of Boxing Alliances in the Philippines); Qatar (Qatar Boxing Federation); Saudi Arabia (Saudi Boxing Federation); Singapore (Singapore Boxing Federation); South Korea (Boxing Association of Korea); Sri Lanka (Sri Lanka Boxing Association); Syria (Syria national amateur boxing athletes); Tajikistan (Tajikistan Boxing Federation); Chinese Taipei (Chinese Taipei Boxing Association); Thailand (Thailand Boxing Association); Turkmenistan (Turkmenistan Boxing Federation); United Arab Emirates (United Arab Emirates Boxing Federation); Uzbekistan (Uzbekistan Boxing Federation); Vietnam (Vietnam Boxing Federation); Yemen (Yemen Boxing Federation)	Albania (Albania Boxing Federation); Armenia (Boxing Federation of Armenia); Andorra (Andorran Boxing Federation); Austria (Austrian Boxing Federation); Azerbaijan (The Boxing Federation of Azerbaijan); Belarus (Belarusian Boxing Federation); Belgium (Vlaamse Boks Liga); Bosnia and Herzegovina (Bosnia and Herzegovina Boxing Federation); Bulgaria (Bulgarian Boxing Federation); Croatia (Croatian Boxing Federation); Cyprus (Cyprus Amateur Boxing Federation); (Czech Republic) Czechia (Czech Boxing Association); Denmark (Danish Boxing Association); England (England Boxing); Estonia (Estonian Boxing Association); Faroe Islands (Boxing Association of the Faroe Islands); Finland (Suomen Nyrkkeilyliitto); France (French Boxing Federation); (Georgia (country)) Georgia (National Boxing Federation of Georgia); Germany (Deutscher Boxsport-Verband); Gibraltar (Gibraltar Boxing Association); Greece (Hellenic Boxing Federation); Hungary (Magyar Ökölvívó Szakszövetség); Iceland (Hnefaleikasamband Íslands); (Republic of Ireland) Ireland (Boxing Ireland); Israel (Israel Boxing Association); Italy (Federazione Pugilistica Italiana); Kosovo (Kosovo Boxing Federation); Latvia (Latvia Boxing Federation); Lithuania (Lithuania Boxing Federation); Luxembourg (Luxembourg Boxing Federation); Malta (Malta Boxing Federation); Moldova (Boxing Federation of the Republic of Moldova); Montenegro (Boxing Association of Montenegro); Netherlands (Nederlandse Boksbond); North Macedonia (National Boxing Federation of North Macedonia); Norway (Norwegian Boxing Federation); Poland (Polski Związek Bokserski); Portugal (Federação Portuguesa de Boxe); Romania (Romania Boxing Federation); Russia (Russian Boxing Federation); Scotland (Boxing Scotland); Serbia (Serbia Boxing Federation); Slovakia (Slovak Amateur Boxing Association); Slovenia (Slovenian Boxing Federation); Spain (Royal Spanish Boxing Federation); Sweden (Svenska Boxningsförbundet); Switzerland (SwissBoxing); Turkey (Turkish Boxing Federation); Ukraine (Федерація боксу України); Wales (Welsh Boxing); In addition, GB Boxing is an associate member: this is because the governance of amateur boxing in the United Kingdom, like cricket, football and rugby union, is devolved to the Home Nations.	Australia (Boxing Australia); Fiji (Fiji Amateur Boxing Association); Federated States of Micronesia (Federated States of Micronesia Boxing Association); French Polynesia (Fédération de Boxe de Polynésie Française); Kiribati (Kiribati Boxing); Marshall Islands (Marshall Islands Boxing Federation); Nauru (Nauru Boxing Federation); New Zealand (Boxing New Zealand); Niue (NIUE Boxing Federation); Papua New Guinea (PNG Boxing Union Inc.); Samoa (Independent Boxing Samoa); Solomon Islands (Solomon Islands Amateur Boxing Federation); Tonga (Tonga Federation of Boxing); Tuvalu (Tuvalu Amateur Boxing Association); Vanuatu (Vanuatu Boxing Federation)

== Executive Board of World Boxing ==
Office	Name
President	Gennadiy Golovkin (KAZ)
Vice President	Ryan O’Shea (CAN)
Vice President	Matt Holt (GBR)
Vice President	Dinah Glykidis (AUS)
Executive Board	Michael Muller (GER)
Executive Board	Victorico Vargas (PHI)
Executive Board	Tatsuya Nakama (JPN)
Athlete Representative (Chair)	Caitlin Parker (AUS)
Athlete Representative (Vice Chair)	Richard Torrez Jr (USA)
President, Asian Boxing	Pichai Chunhavajira (THA)
President, European Boxing	Lars Brovil (DEN)
President, Oceania Boxing	Beulah Daunakamakama (FJI)
President, Panamerican Boxing	Elise Seignolle (USA)
Chair Sport and Competition Committee	Hernan Salvo (ARG)
Chair Medical and Anti-Doping Committee	Dr Armando Sanchez (USA)
Chair Finance and Audit Committee	Julia Felton (AUS)

== Presidents ==
#	President	Nation	Term
1	Boris van der Vorst	Netherlands	2023-2025
2	Gennady Golovkin	Kazakhstan	2025–present

== See also ==
- List of boxing organisations
