= Alcazar, Edmonton =

Entertainment venue located in United Kingdom

Coordinates: 51°36′55.93″N 0°3′51.9″W

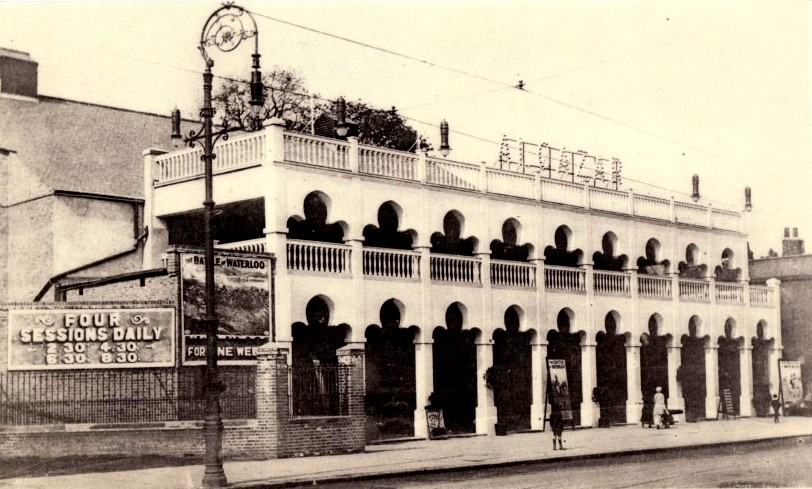
The Alcazar with a poster for The Battle of Waterloo

The Alcazar, also known as the Alcazar Cinematograph Theatre, was an entertainment venue in Fore Street, Edmonton in London. The building was destroyed during World War II.

The Alcazar opened in 1913 with the film The Battle of Waterloo. In addition to being a cinema, the Alcazar hosted concerts, roller skating, boxing, and wrestling. It could seat 1,700 people and had a separate dance hall and summer and winter gardens. It had a Moorish style front with balcony and verandah. The Alcazar was renovated in 1933 and sound added to the cinema.

The Alcazar was badly damaged by bombings in 1940 and 1944. The remains were demolished and the site redeveloped in the 1960s. A mosaic in nearby Moree Way created by Art Start and local schoolchildren commemorates the Alcazar.
