= World Boxing Cup =

Boxing world cup

- Status: Active
- Genre: Boxing World Cup
- Frequency: Annually
- Years active: 2023–present
- Inaugurated: 2023
- Organiser: World Boxing
- Website: Website

The World Boxing Cup is an amateur boxing competition organised by World Boxing. It consists of male and female boxers accruing ranking points over stages of the tournament during the year.

== History ==
World Boxing Cup is a tournament where elite male and female boxers accrue ranking points over several stages of competition during the year. There are 10 categories for both men and women.

== Editions ==
Year	Stage	Host	Dates	Ref
2023		(Germany) Cologne	28–31 October	
2024	I	(United Kingdom) Sheffield	17–20 January	
2024	II	(United States) Pueblo	16–20 April	
2024	III	(Mongolia) Ulaanbaatar	23–26 September	
2024	Finals	(United Kingdom) Sheffield	27–30 November	
2025	I	(Brazil) Foz do Iguaçu	31 March – 5 April	
2025	II	(Poland) Warsaw	12–16 May	
2025	III	(Kazakhstan) Astana	30 June – 6 July	
2025	Finals	(India) Greater Noida	16–20 November	
2026	I	(Brazil) Foz do Iguaçu	20–26 April	
2026	II	(China) Guiyang	15–21 June	
2026	Finals	(Uzbekistan) Tashkent	26 November – 4 December	

== See also ==
- World Boxing
- World Boxing Championships
- World Boxing U19 Championships
