= Imane Khelif =

Algerian boxer (born 1999)

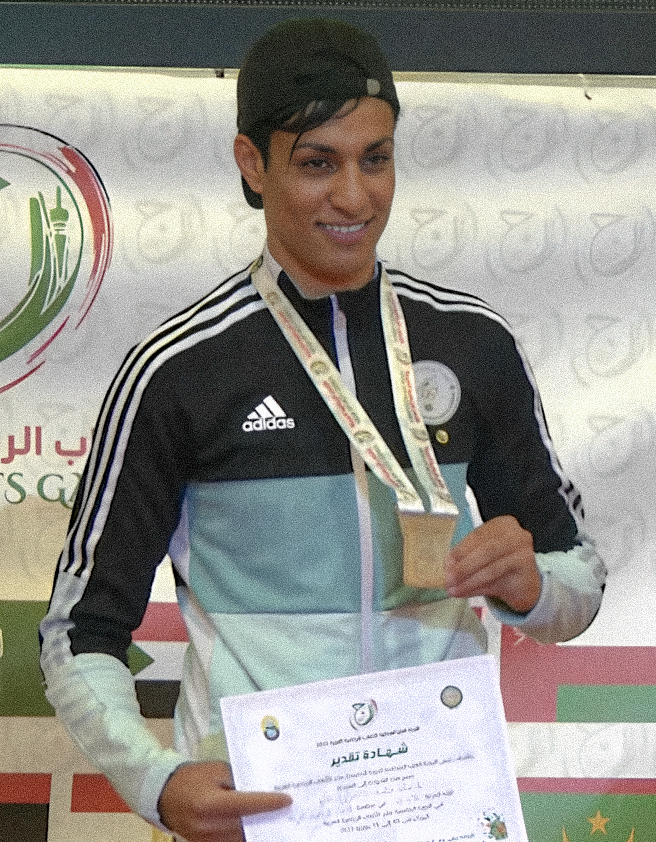
- Khelif in 2023

Personal information
- Native name: إيمان خليف
- Born: 2 May 1999 (age 27) Aïn Sidi Ali, Laghouat, Algeria
- Height: 1.78 m (5 ft 10 in)

Boxing career
- Weight class: Light welterweight; Welterweight
- Stance: Orthodox
Medal record
Women's amateur boxing
Representing Algeria
Olympic Games
Gold medal – first place	2024 Paris	Welterweight
World Championships
Silver medal – second place	2022 Istanbul	Light welterweight
African Championships
Gold medal – first place	2022 Maputo	Light welterweight
Mediterranean Games
Gold medal – first place	2022 Oran	Light welterweight
Arab Games
Gold medal – first place	2023 Algiers	Welterweight

Imane Khelif (Arabic: إيمان خليف, romanized: ʾĪmān Khalīf, pronounced [ʔiːˈmaːn xəˈliːf]; born 2 May 1999) is an Algerian professional boxer who won the women's welterweight gold medal at the 2024 Summer Olympics. She made her international debut at 2018 AIBA Women's World Boxing Championships, competing in both the lightweight and welterweight categories, and later reached the quarterfinals of the women's lightweight event at the 2020 Summer Olympics. (Note: Delayed until 2021 due to the COVID-19 pandemic) Following wins at a series of regional victories, Khelif secured a silver medal at the 2022 IBA Women's World Boxing Championships and gold at the 2024 Olympics.

She was disqualified from the 2023 IBA Women's World Boxing Championships after allegedly failing unspecified sex verification tests, a decision that the International Olympic Committee (IOC) subsequently criticised as "sudden and arbitrary". After Khelif defeated Angela Carini at the 2024 Olympic Games, false claims that she was a man circulated online, causing controversy. Khelif was born female and has competed exclusively in women's events, including those overseen by the IOC. She is not transgender.

Since the introduction of mandatory sex verification testing for women by World Boxing in May 2025, Khelif has not taken part in events run by the organisation. As of September 2025, her appeal against the requirement was ongoing. In a February 2026 interview with CNN, Khelif revealed that she has high levels of testosterone, which she has been reducing under medical supervision; she also indicated her willingness to undergo the mandatory sex verification tests required by the IOC.

== Early life ==
Khelif was born in Aïn Sidi Ali, Laghouat Province. When she was two months old, her family moved to Biban Mesbah, a rural village in Tiaret Province, where she would grow up. Her father said she "has loved sport since she was six-years-old." She originally played football before switching to boxing. In her early years, she had to commute to Tiaret to attend training sessions, and sold bread and scrap metal to afford the bus fare. She stated that her father, who is a welder, initially did not allow her to participate in the sport because "he did not approve of boxing for girls".

== Career ==
=== 2018–2021: Career beginnings and Olympic debut ===
At the 2018 AIBA Women's World Boxing Championships, Khelif finished 17th in the women's lightweight event after being eliminated in the first round by Karina Ibragimova. At the 2019 AIBA Women's World Boxing Championships, she finished 33rd in the women's lightweight event after being eliminated in the first round by Natalia Shadrina.

Khelif represented Algeria in the women's lightweight event at the 2020 Summer Olympics, where she was defeated by Ireland's Kellie Harrington in the quarterfinals. She was the first female boxer to represent Algeria at the Olympics. In March 2021, she won a gold medal at the Istanbul Bosphorus International Boxing Tournament, defeating Anastasia Belyakova in the final of the women's lightweight event.

=== 2022: IBA Championships final and boxing successes ===
In February 2022, Khelif won a gold medal at the Strandja Memorial Tournament after defeating Nataliya Sychugova in the final of the women's 63 kg event. Khelif was selected as Algeria's flagbearer at the 2022 IBA Women's World Boxing Championships. At the tournament, she became the first Algerian female boxer to reach the final after defeating Chelsey Heijnen. She was then defeated by Amy Broadhurst in the final and finished runner-up. Later that year, Khelif saw further success, winning gold medals at the Mediterranean Games and the African Amateur Boxing Championships.

=== 2023: IBA Championships disqualification ===
Khelif receiving her gold medal after defeating Morocco's Oumaïma Belahbib in the women's welterweight final of the 2023 Arab Games

In March 2023, Khelif competed for the gold medal in the finals at the IBA Women's World Boxing Championships; however, she was disqualified shortly before her gold medal bout against People's Republic of China boxer Yang Liu. The disqualification came amid allegations from the Russian-led International Boxing Association (IBA) that Khelif had failed unspecified eligibility tests. This disqualification happened three days after Khelif defeated Azalia Amineva, a previously unbeaten Russian prospect. The disqualification restored the Russian boxer's undefeated record. According to the Algerian Olympic Committee, Khelif was disqualified for medical reasons. Uzbekistani boxer Navbakhor Khamidova was awarded the bronze medal over Khelif.

In 2023, Umar Kremlev, president of the IBA, claimed that the disqualifications were because DNA tests "proved they had XY chromosomes". The Washington Post stated, "It remains unclear what standards Khelif and Lin Yu-ting failed [in 2023] to lead to the disqualifications", further writing, "There never has been evidence that ... Khelif ... had XY chromosomes or elevated levels of testosterone." The IBA did not reveal the testing methodology, stating the "specifics remain confidential". At the time, Khelif said the ruling meant having "characteristics that mean I can't box with women", but said she was the victim of a "big conspiracy" regarding the disqualification. Her appeal to the Court of Arbitration for Sport was terminated after the required procedural costs were not paid.

On 31 July 2024, regarding their 2023 decision, the IBA stated that Khelif and others "did not undergo a testosterone examination but were subject to a separate and recognized test, whereby the specifics remain confidential", and further alleged that they "were found to have competitive advantages over other female competitors". The following day, the IOC released their own statement in response, stating that the IBA's decision was "sudden and arbitrary" and "without any due process". IOC further stated:

According to the IBA minutes available on their website, this decision was initially taken solely by the IBA Secretary General and CEO. The IBA Board only ratified it afterward and only subsequently requested that a procedure to follow in similar cases in the future be established and reflected in the IBA Regulations. The minutes also say that the IBA should "establish a clear procedure on gender testing".

In July 2023, four months after the IBA Championships disqualification, Khelif represented Algeria at the Arab Games, where she won a gold medal in the women's welterweight event. In November 2023, she announced that she was turning professional; her first professional fight took place in Singapore that month.

=== 2024 ===
==== Olympic gold medal ====
Arabic-language interview with Khelif following her second-round fight

In January 2024, Khelif became a UNICEF national ambassador. In April, she won the women's 66 kg event at the World Boxing Cup in Pueblo, Colorado, U.S., defeating Emilie Sonvico in the final. The boxing events in Paris for the 2024 Summer Olympics were managed by the International Olympic Committee (IOC) Paris 2024 Boxing Unit. The IBA had been suspended by the IOC in 2019 due to governance issues under prior leadership; since then, Olympic boxing has been overseen by an IOC task force. The IOC cleared Khelif to compete in Paris, confirming that she complied with all necessary eligibility and medical regulations for the event. The IOC stated that all athletes competing in Paris comply with the competition's eligibility and entry regulation, and that Khelif "was born female, was registered female, lived her life as a female, boxed as a female, has a female passport". Later, the IOC confirmed receiving the letter from the IBA in June 2023, and stated that "from the conception of the test, to how the test was shared with us, to how the tests have become public, is so flawed that it's impossible to engage with it".

During the IBA press conference in Paris on 5 August 2024, the organization's position and its president, Umar Kremlev, regarding the nature of the conducted tests changed and became contradictory. Initially, the IBA claimed that sex verification tests were conducted. Still, at the conference, Secretary General Chris Roberts spoke of "chromosome tests", while Kremlev asserted that the tests aimed to determine testosterone levels in athletes. The situation was exacerbated by Kremlev's statements, who repeatedly criticized IOC President Thomas Bach, declared his intention to initiate legal proceedings against him, and expressed dissatisfaction with the Olympic Games opening ceremony, calling it "humiliating". The IBA claimed to have used laboratories accredited by the World Anti-Doping Agency (WADA) for testing, but WADA denied involvement in sex verification, stating it deals solely with anti-doping matters.

Seeded fifth in the women's 66 kg (welterweight) event, Khelif defeated Hungary's Luca Hámori in the quarterfinals on 3 August. She then defeated Thailand's Janjaem Suwannapheng in the semifinals on 6 August, guaranteeing her at least a silver medal in the event. On 9 August, she defeated Yang Liu of China in the final to win the gold medal. Khelif became Algeria's first female gold medalist in boxing, as well as the country's first boxer of any gender to win a medal since Mohamed Allalou in 2000, and the first to win a gold medal since Hocine Soltani in 1996. Khelif's win came after she faced intense public scrutiny over her eligibility to compete in the women's category, including from celebrities and world leaders. Khelif became the target of online abuse and misinformation, including the false claim that she is a man.

==== Second-round fight against Angela Carini ====
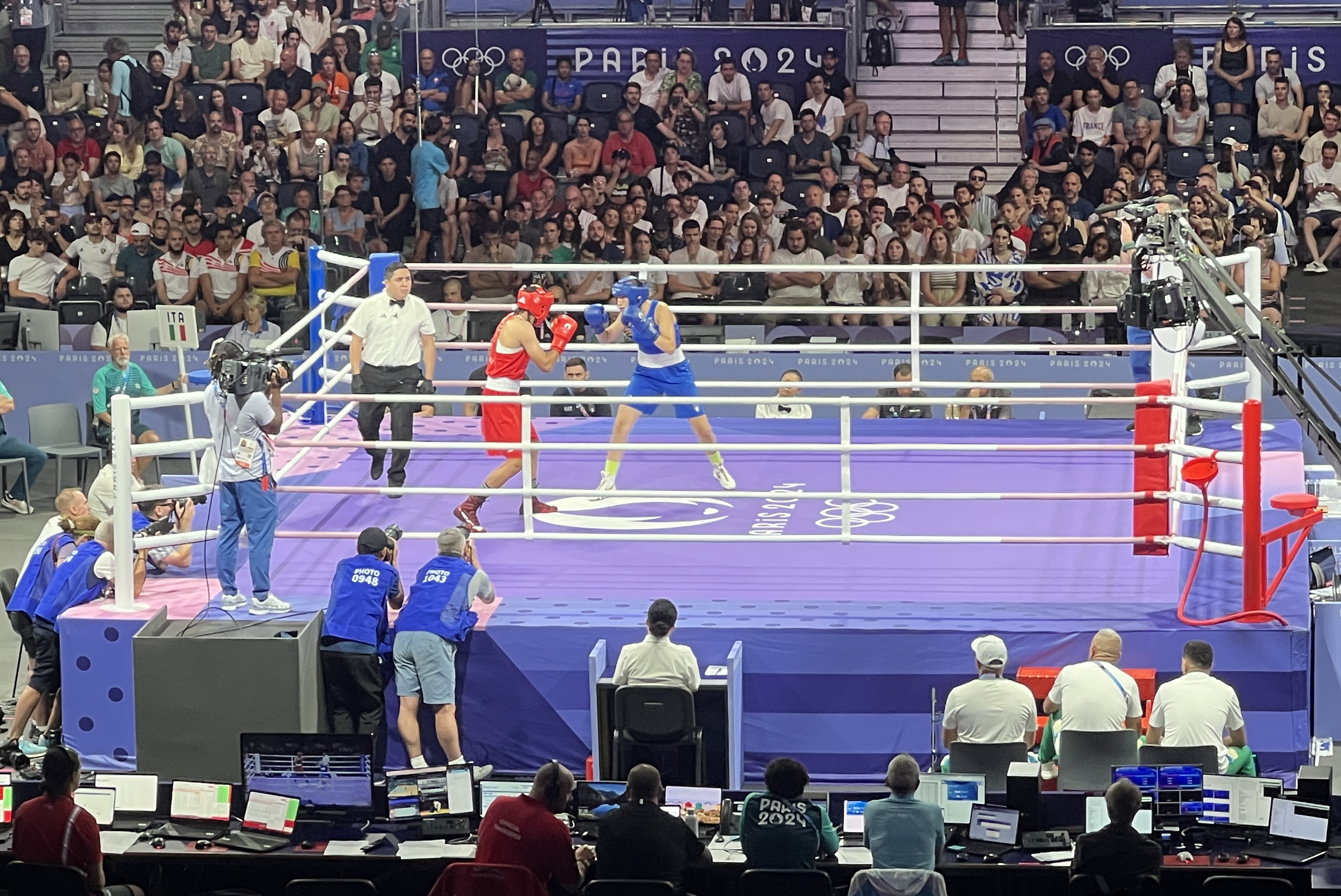
Khelif (red) and Carini during their second-round fight at the 2024 Summer Olympics

As the fifth seed, Khelif received a bye into the second round. In the second round, held on 1 August, she defeated Angela Carini of Italy 46 seconds after the match commenced, when Carini withdrew after receiving two blows, citing intense pain in her nose. Carini reportedly exclaimed, "It's not fair!" after a punch from Khelif. Because of this, Khelif received online backlash from those who questioned her gender.

The next day, Carini apologized to Khelif via the Italian newspaper La Gazzetta dello Sport, stating, "All this controversy makes me sad ... I'm sorry for my opponent, too. If the IOC said she can fight, I respect that decision." The Algerian Olympic Committee (COA) defended Khelif, stating before the match that Khelif had been the victim of "unethical targeting" and "baseless propaganda", and that they had taken "all necessary measures" to protect Khelif and her right to compete. The COA said it had filed a complaint with the IOC about Khelif's online harassment, and said in a statement, "We reserve the right to prosecute everyone who participated in the heinous campaign against our heroine Imane Khelif."

Khelif's father, in a statement to Sky Sports, stated, "My child is a girl. She was raised as a girl. She's a strong girl. I raised her to be hard-working and brave. She has a strong will to work and to train." At a news conference on 3 August 2024, IOC President Thomas Bach defended the participation of Khelif and Lin Yu-ting, saying, "There was never any doubt about them being a woman." He further reaffirmed that Khelif was born a woman and denounced hate speech against her.

On 6 November 2024, the IOC disclosed that Khelif was preparing a lawsuit against Le Correspondant, a French magazine which had earlier in the week published claims about the boxer's eligibility, which the magazine said came from a leaked medical report. The IOC said that the Le Correspondant story references "unverified documents whose origin cannot be confirmed".

=== 2025-2026: World Boxing sex verification testing and hiatus ===
In May 2025, World Boxing, the international governing body for boxing, announced the implementation of sex verification testing for all athletes in events sanctioned by the group; its announcement specifically singled out Khelif by saying she would be barred from competing until she underwent sex testing to prove the absence of an SRY gene and androgenizing DSDs. World Boxing faced criticism for naming Khelif in the announcement, and president Boris van der Vorst apologized to the Algerian federation for what it perceived as a violation of her privacy. Khelif had intended to return to international competition at the Eindhoven Box Cup in June 2025. However, following World Boxing's announcement of mandatory sex testing, tournament officials reported that Khelif had not registered for the event. As of April 2026, Khelif has not participated in World Boxing-sanctioned events since the announcement.

She appealed the World Boxing decision in August 2025, but the Court of Arbitration for Sport declined her request to suspend the World Boxing decision until the case was heard. This decision, delivered on 1 September 2025, prevented Khelif from participating in the World Boxing championship that started three days later.

In a February 2026 interview with CNN, Khelif revealed that she has high levels of testosterone, which she has been reducing under medical supervision; she also indicated her willingness to undergo the mandatory sex verification tests required by the IOC.

In a February 2026 interview with L'Équipe, Khelif was asked: "To be clear, you have a female phenotype but possess the SRY gene, an indicator of masculinity", to which she responded: "Yes, and it’s natural. I have female hormones." Subsequent reporting interpreted this exchange as her confirming she has the SRY gene. The Guardian lists Khelif among high-profile Olympians who have a DSD, but as of February 2026, she has not explicitly described herself as intersex or as having a DSD.

In March, it was announced that Khelif planned to make her professional debut in Paris. The fight was postponed due to an injury sustained by Khelif.
