= Syria national amateur boxing athletes =

Syria national amateur boxing athletes represents Syria in regional, continental and world tournaments and matches sanctioned by the amateur International Boxing Association (AIBA).

== Asian Games ==
=== 2006 Doha Asian Games ===
Twelve boxers represented Syria in this edition of the Asiad. With one bronze medal, this country is ranked 11th in a four-way tie in the boxing medal tally.
