= Boris van der Vorst =

President of World Boxing (born 1972)

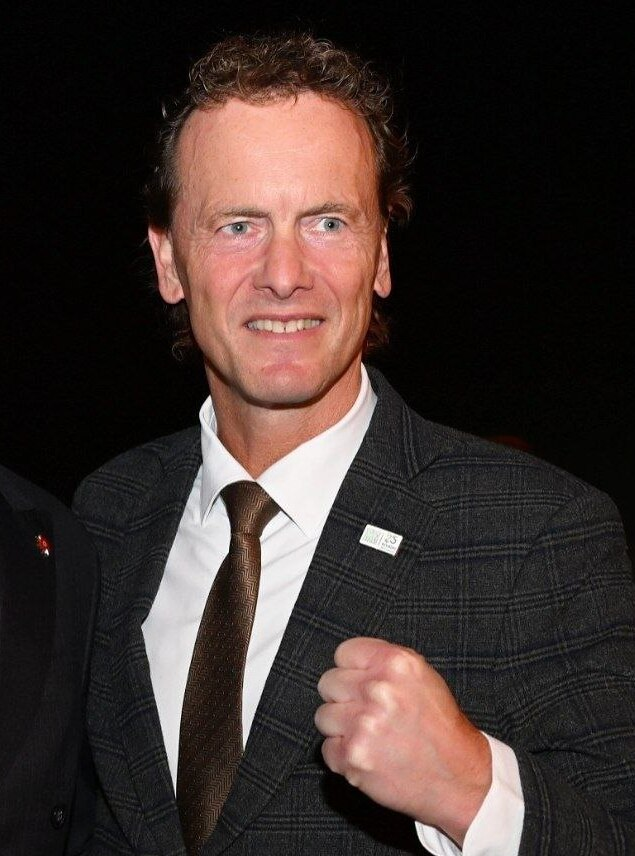
- van der Vorst in 2025
- Born: 18 February 1972 (age 54)
- Board member of: World Boxing
- Children: 3

Boris van der Vorst (born 18 February 1972) was the first president of World Boxing, a governing body of amateur boxing.

On 18 September 2025, Van der Vorst announced he would step down in November 2025.
