= Boxing in the United States =

Sport in a geographic region

- Country: United States
- Governing body: USA Boxing
- National team: United States Olympics team

International competitions
- AIBA World Boxing Championships; Summer Olympics

The origins of boxing in the United States can be traced as far back as the 19th century. Many notable fighters, trainers, promoters, and officials are based in the United States. Some people practice it as a form of self-defense while doing it as a part of their workout regime. The United States became the center of professional boxing in the early 20th century.

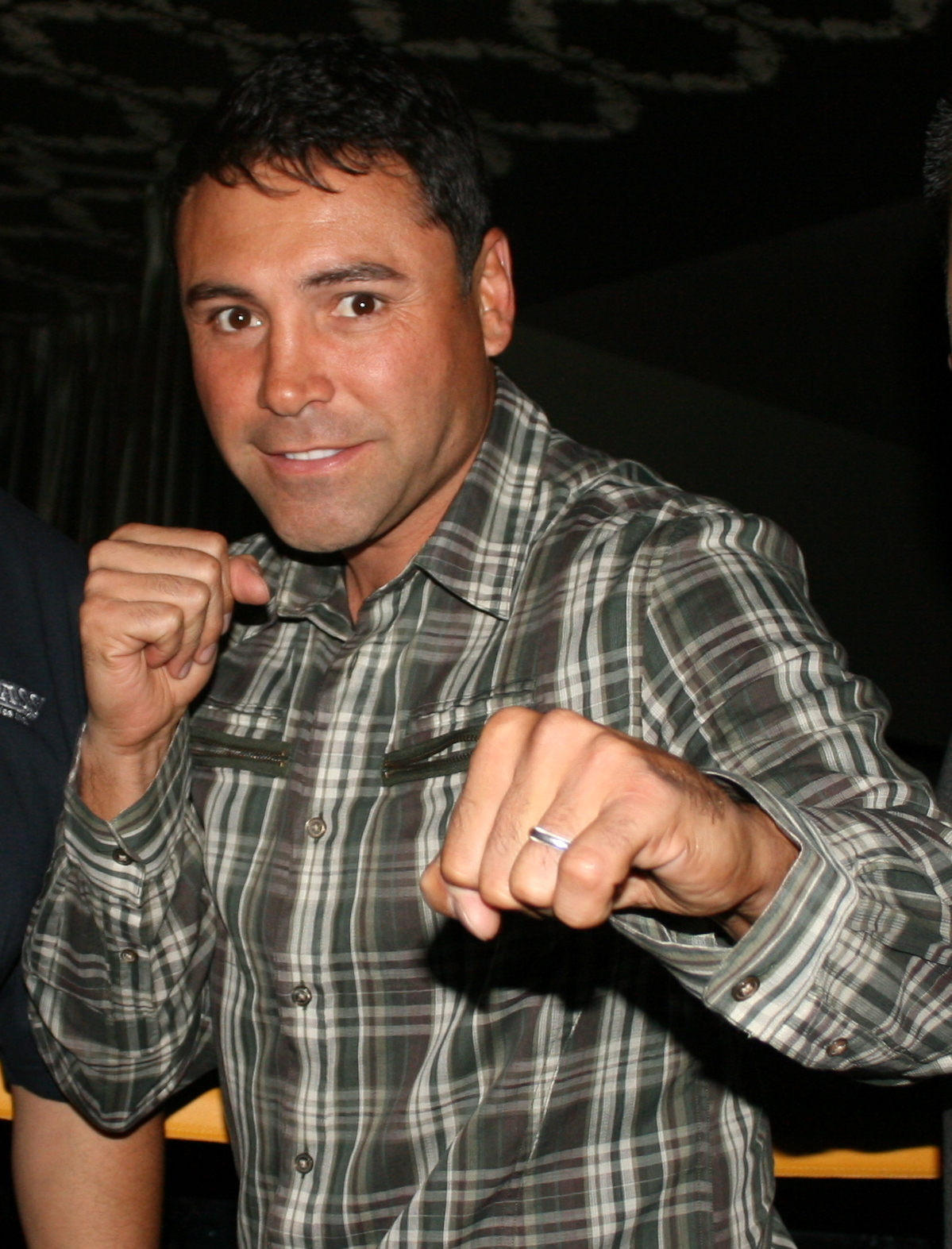
Oscar De La Hoya won ten world titles in six different weight classes, including the lineal championship in three weight classes and winning a gold medal in the lightweight division.

== History ==
The sport of boxing came to the United States from England in the late 1700s and took root in the 1800s mainly in large urban areas such as Boston, New York City, and New Orleans. Slave-owners trained enslaved people to fight others and gambled on the outcome, and sometimes gave freedom to those who won money. The first professional boxers in the US were free Black men.

John L. Sullivan became the first American heavyweight champion in 1882 under the bare knuckle boxing rules and again in 1892, becoming the first world Heavyweight champion of the gloved era. He was defeated by James Corbett, often referred to as the father of modern boxing due to his innovative scientific technique, in 1892. In the 1890s, the United States eclipsed Britain as the center of boxing.

Jack Johnson was the first African American heavyweight champion.

The National Boxing Association was founded in 1921 and began to sanction title fights.

Joe Louis was an American professional boxer who competed from 1934 to 1951. He reigned as the world heavyweight champion from 1937 to 1949, and is considered to be one of the greatest heavyweight boxers of all time. In 2005, Louis was ranked as the best heavyweight of all time by the International Boxing Research Organization, and was ranked number one on The Ring magazine's list of the "100 greatest punchers of all time". Louis had the longest single reign as champion of any heavyweight boxer in history.

Louis is widely regarded as the first person of African-American descent to achieve the status of a nationwide hero within the United States and was also a focal point of anti-Nazi sentiment leading up to and during World War II. He was instrumental in integrating the game of golf, breaking the sport's color barrier in America by appearing under a sponsor's exemption in a PGA event in 1952.

Since the late 1990s, boxing has declined in popularity due to multiple factors, such as more sports entertainment options and combat alternatives such as MMA's UFC amongst a younger demographic; lack of mainstream coverage in newspapers and access on major television networks; and the lack of a U.S. heavyweight world champion.

It was hoped in 2015 that the Floyd Mayweather Jr. vs. Manny Pacquiao fight would re-invigorate interest in the sport in the United States, but because the fight was disappointing, it was perceived as doing further harm to the image of the sport in the United States.

== Professional boxing ==
In 1920, the Walker Law legalized prizefighting in New York state by establishing the New York State Athletic Commission. In response, representatives from 13 states established the National Boxing Association and also began to sanction title fights. The NYSAC and NBA sometimes crowned different "world champions" in the same division, leading to confusion about who was the real champion.

Jack Dempsey became one of the most popular athletes in the 1920s promoted by the likes of Tex Rickard.

In the 1940s and 1950s, many African American boxers were restricted by the competitions they could enter, see Murderers' Row .

After World War II, television took on an important role in professional boxing. It was popular because of its relatively low production costs compared with other sports, professional boxing was a major feature of television programming throughout much of the 1950s and early 1960s.

In the 1960s and 1970s, Muhammad Ali became an iconic figure, transformed the role and image of the African American athlete in America by his embrace of racial pride, and transcended the sport by refusing to serve in the Vietnam War. In the 1980s and 1990s, major boxers such as Mike Tyson and Riddick Bowe were marked by crime and self-destruction.

== Amateur boxing ==
The Amateur Athletic Union of the United States was founded in 1888 and began its annual championships in boxing the same year. In 1926 the Chicago Tribune started a boxing competition called the Golden Gloves. The United States of America Amateur Boxing Federation (now USA Boxing), which governs American amateur boxing, was formed after Amateur Sports Act of 1978 enabled the governance of sports in the US by organizations other than the AAU. This act made each sport set up its own National governing body (NGB). Each of these governing bodies would be part of the United States Olympic Committee, but would not be run by the Committee.

In 1992 Dallas Malloy won a case and USA Boxing admitted women to its program, being the first governing body in the world to do so.

An international organization for amateur boxing was begun in 1946, known as the International Amateur Boxing Association. The development amateur scene of boxing has seen the United States as a world beater. In the Olympics the US has won 106 Olympic medals to date: 47 gold, 23 silver and 36 bronzes. Most heavyweight champions of this century originate from the United States.

== Women's boxing ==
The first recorded women's boxing match in the United States occurred in New York in 1888, when Hattie Leslie beat Alice Leary in a brutal fight.

Women's boxing was rarely acknowledged until the 1970s, when Cathy 'Cat' Davis, Marian Trimiar and Jackie Tonawanda became the first women in the United States to be issued boxing licenses. Davis was the first female boxer to appear on the cover of Ring Magazine.

In the 1990s, women’s boxing had a brief period of popularity due to boxers such as Christy Martin and Laila Ali. But early into 2000's, the sport fell back to relative obscurity due to lack of promotion, television exposure and poor matchmaking. Many female professional boxers in the United States struggle to make a viable living due to lack of financial opportunities and promotional opportunities. In 2012, interest in women's boxing was revived when women were allowed to compete in boxing at the Olympic Games for the first time.

== Television and media coverage ==
Boxing used to be a popular staple viewing on American television due to its low costs and production values and was broadcast on all the major networks. Since the 1970s, it is mostly broadcast on pay-per-view and pay television channels, like HBO and Showtime. However, this and a myriad of factors resulted the sport's decline in popularity beginning in the late 1990s. One noted factor was the sport's exclusivity to these premium outlets, while mixed martial arts events were eventually broadcast on major television networks and more accessible platforms, drawing in a younger demographic and more mainstream coverage.

It was hoped that the 2015 Floyd Mayweather Jr. vs. Manny Pacquiao PPV would re-invigorate interest in the sport in the United States, but the eponymous main event was considered disappointing and was perceived as doing further harm to the image of the sport. 2015 would also mark the launch of Al Haymon's Premier Boxing Champions, which would help reintroduce the sport to mainstream audiences by airing events on both broadcast and cable networks and incorporating thematic elements to court younger viewership. At its peak, the series saw 4.8 million viewers for the 2016 Errol Spence Jr. vs Leonard Bundu telecast on NBC.

The 2017 match between Floyd Mayweather Jr. vs. Conor McGregor garnered major mainstream attention, in-part due to the celebrity status of UFC fighter Conor McGregor. The event received 4.3 million domestic buys; the second-highest buy rate in pay-per-view history. In the same year, Top Rank began a multi-year broadcasting agreement with ESPN, in which the network would broadcast events airing across its linear and digital properties, and an option to carry events on pay-per-view. ESPN would extend the agreement through 2025 on August 2, 2018.

== See also ==
- Boxing firms in the United States
  - Don King Productions
  - Golden Boy Promotions
  - Top Rank
- Boxing on American television
  - Boxing After Dark
  - Boxing on CBS
  - Boxing on ESPN
  - Boxing on NBC
  - Fight of the Week
  - HBO World Championship Boxing
  - Premier Boxing Champions
  - Showtime Championship Boxing
