= Intergender wrestling =

Professional wrestling genre

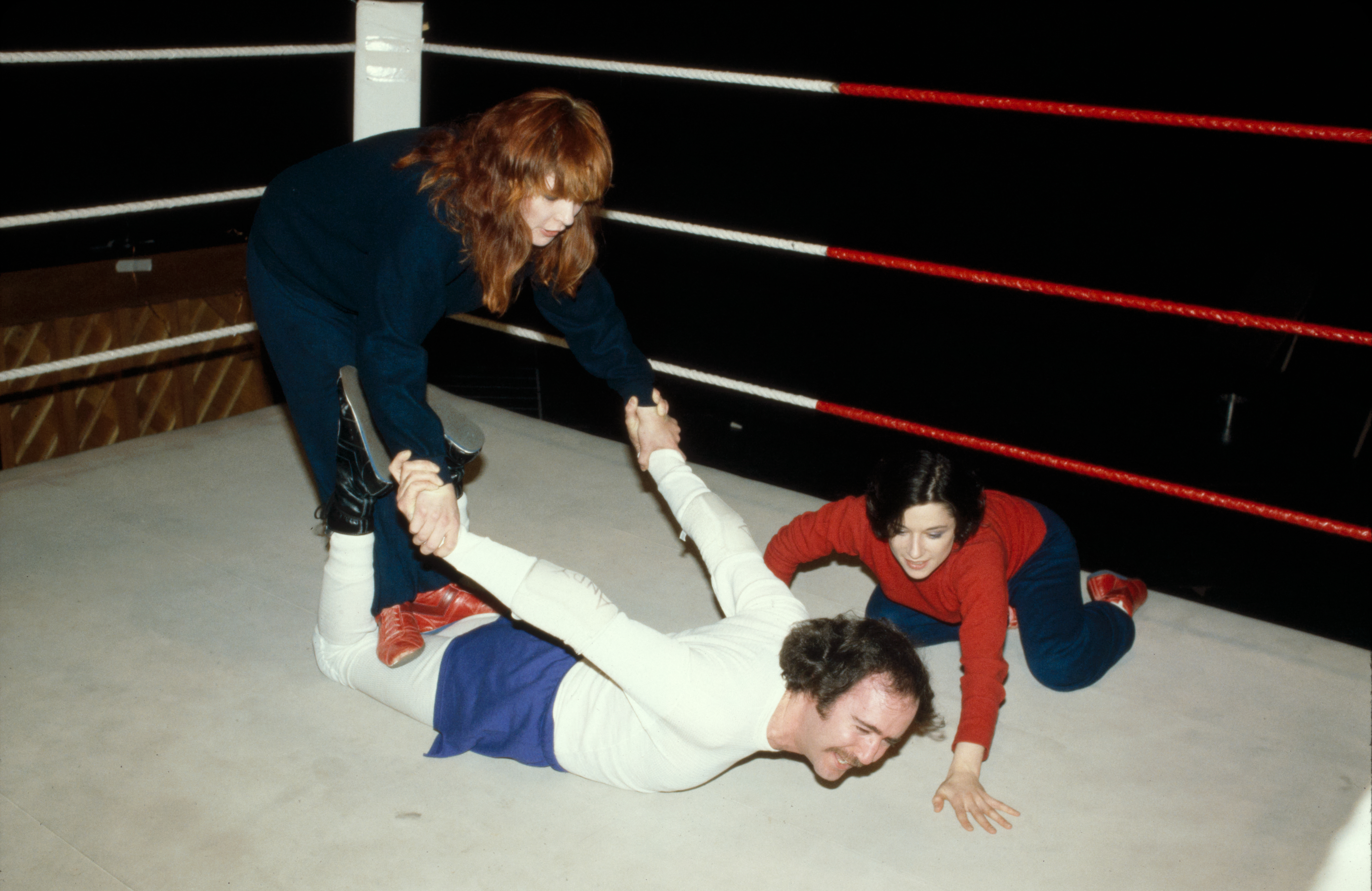
Andy Kaufman wrestling with Debbie Harry and Caitlin Clarke in 1983

Intergender wrestling, also known as mixed wrestling, is a type of professional wrestling (staged and choreographed) match between a man and a woman and may also refer to tag team matches with both men and women on each team.

== History ==
For most of its history, men and women would rarely compete against each other in professional wrestling. It was deemed to be unfair and unchivalrous. Intergender wrestling was first utilized in the late-1970s/early-1980s by comedian Andy Kaufman. Kaufman participated in several filmed staged matches of this nature and proclaimed himself the "World Intergender Wrestling Champion," issuing an open challenge to any female challenger who could defeat him. This was the beginning of a famous crossover feud between Kaufman and wrestling legend Jerry "The King" Lawler.

Cathy Davis sued the New York State Athletic Commission (NYSAC) in 1977 because she was denied a boxing license because she was a woman, and the case was decided in her favor later that year, with the judge invalidating New York State rule number 205.15, which stated, “No woman may be licensed as a boxer or second or licensed to compete in any wrestling exhibition with men.” In his opinion the judge cited the precedent set by Garrett v. New York State Athletic Commission (1975), which “found the regulation invalid under the equal protection clauses of the State and Federal Constitutions”. The NYSAC filed an appeal of the ruling, but later dropped it.

After The MSG "Curtain Call" incident in 1996 when professional wrestling was exposed as being scripted, intergender wrestling became more common and accepted by the fans. Intergender matches experienced a surge of popular interest and were often introduced to the roster of events in major North American promotions such as Extreme Championship Wrestling, World Wrestling Federation and World Championship Wrestling. Perhaps the most successful female wrestler who competed in intergender matches was Chyna. A well-built ex-bodybuilder, she was regularly booked to wrestle her male counterparts during the WWF Attitude Era. She was a three-time Intercontinental Champion, a championship traditionally only contested by men, and was briefly the #1 contender for the company's world championship. Four women briefly held the company's now discontinued Hardcore Championship: Terri, Mighty Molly, Trish Stratus and one of The Godfather's Hos. The title had a distinct rule that it could be won by pinning the titleholder at anyplace, anywhere 24/7. The discontinued Cruiserweight championship has also been held by three women: Jacqueline (while under the WWE logo), Daffney, and Madusa (the latter while the title was under WCW's banner).

In the Japanese wrestling promotion FMW, Superstar H (unmasked Hayabusa) wrestled Kyoko Inoue in a singles match on pay per view on March 27, 2000. Inoue pinned H in a tag match earlier that month. While Inoue was presented as a credible threat to H and repeatedly downed him with her strikes, H would win decisively.

Harvey Whippleman holds the distinction of being the only male in WWE's history to hold the now-discontinued Women's Championship having defeated The Kat in a snow bunny match while disguised in drag as Hervina.

At WrestleMania 22, The Boogeyman defeated both Booker T and Sharmell in an intergender handicap match.

A prominent intergender six-person hardcore tag team match took place on WWE at One Night Stand 2006, when the team of Edge, Lita and Mick Foley defeated the team of Beulah McGillicutty, Terry Funk and Tommy Dreamer, after male wrestler Edge speared and pinned female wrestler Beulah.

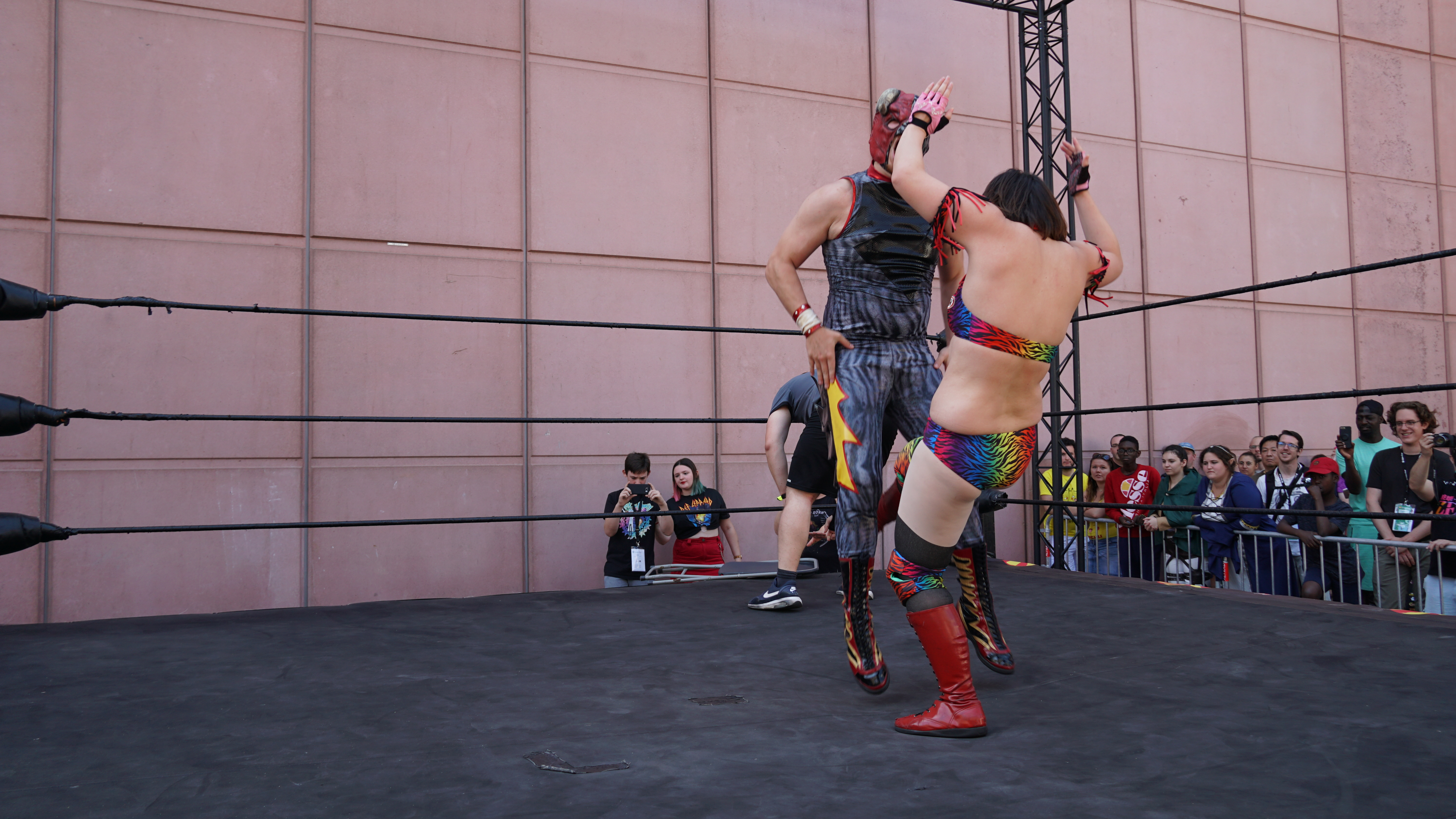
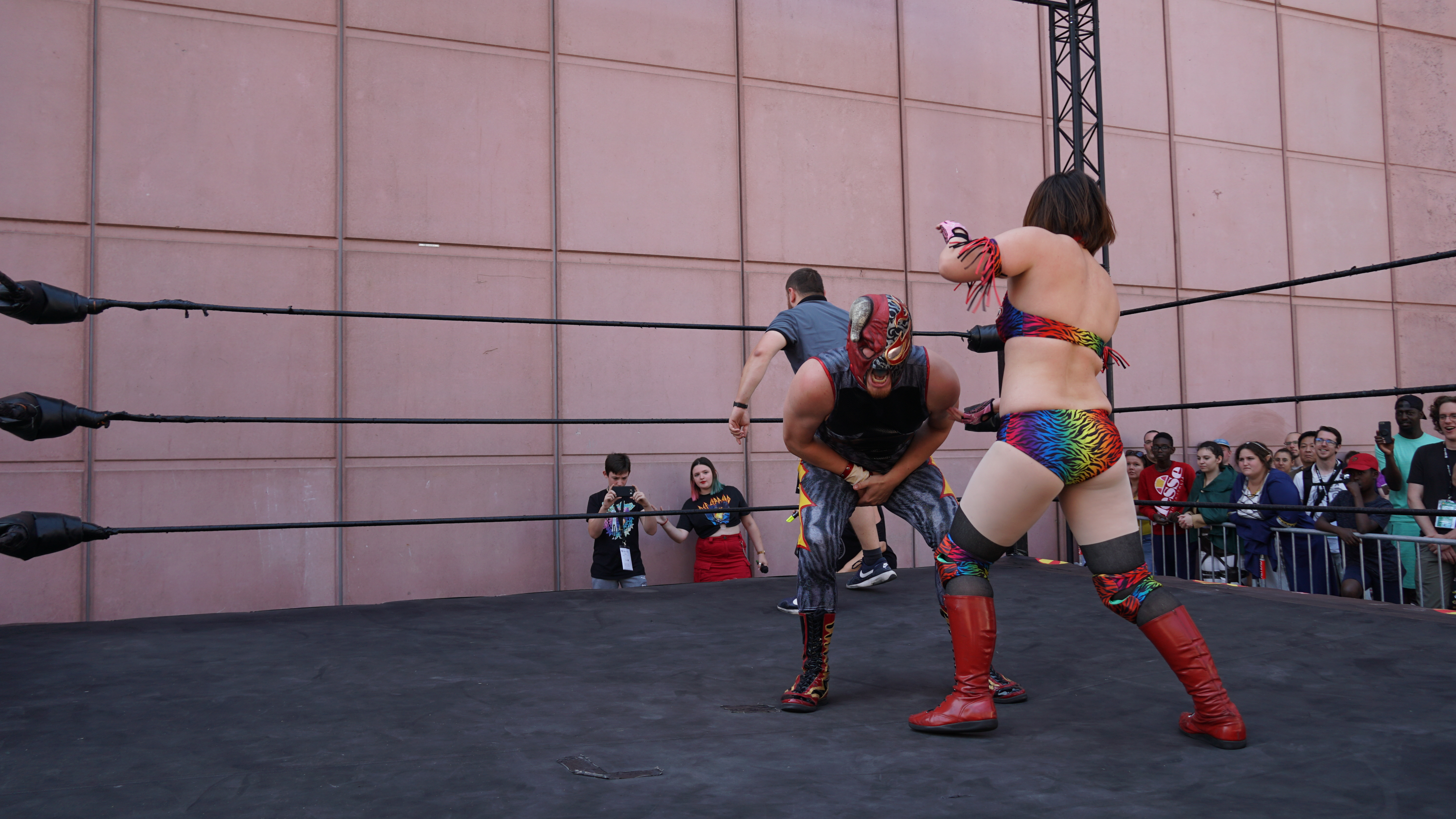
Woman hitting a low blow in a mixed wrestling match.

This match-type continues to meet controversy across North America as matches often straddle the line between sporting events and pure erotic entertainment, and also allegations over the depiction of gratuitous physical violence against hapless women. Although still commonplace on the independent circuit, WWE only permits intergender matches on a part time basis due to PG rating and if the timing is right due to its action figure contract with Mattel, in order to avoid women being overpowered by men on TV, although it has on past occasions featured some of their female competitors compete in the annual Royal Rumble event (a separate Royal Rumble match for women was introduced in 2018). To date, four women have competed at men's Royal Rumble: Chyna (1999 and 2000, the only one to do so multiple times), Beth Phoenix (2010), Kharma (2012) and Nia Jax (2019, the first since the introduction of women's Royal Rumble). In a reverse of this, at WrestleMania 25 wrestler Anthony Carelli (better known by his ring name Santino Marella) won a diva's battle royal while dressed in drag as "Santina Marella" (Santino's twin sister). There has however been a number of intergender matches after the PG rating was introduced, mostly in comedic matches; Lita pinned Heath Slater after he was attacked and left unconscious by several veteran wrestlers prior to the match on the July 23, 2012, episode of Raw. James Ellsworth was also involved in few intergender matches, notably losing one to Becky Lynch on the November 7, 2017, episode of SmackDown Live. At Fastlane (2021) Alexa Bliss was helped by Bray Wyatt to defeat Randy Orton in their cinematic style intergender match that was filled with supernatural gimmicks.

=== In TNA ===
At Hard Justice in 2009, TNA held a tag team match where ODB and her manager Cody Deaner defeated Angelina Love and Velvet Sky (The Beautiful People) to claim Love's TNA Women's Knockout Championship. After the match, the couple fought over who actually held the title, with Deaner claiming it for himself as the "true" champion and "King of the Knockouts" because he scored the pinfall on Sky to win the match. This set up an intergender title match at No Surrender, where Deaner (who, in comedic fashion, repeatedly missed chops and attempted to cheat) was defeated by ODB to officially claim the Knockout Championship.

In mid-2019, a feud emerged between Tessa Blanchard, Sami Callihan, and his stable Ohio Versus Everything (OvE), which led to several notable intergender matches between the two. At Slammiversary XVII in 2019, an intergender match was held as the main event for the first time in a wrestling pay-per-view, which saw Callihan defeat Blanchard. After winning as a tag team in the Mashup Tournament, Blanchard and Callihan received a rematch at Unbreakable to determine the number-one contender for the Impact World Championship at Bound for Glory, which was again won by Callihan.

Blanchard would later win a gauntlet match against five male contenders on Impact Wrestling, becoming the number-one contender for the Impact World Championship. At Hard To Kill in January 2020, Blanchard would defeat Callihan to become the first woman to ever hold the Impact World Championship. While she would defend the title once against Taya Valkyrie (becoming the first women's match ever contested for the Impact World Championship), Blanchard was released by Impact Wrestling in June 2020, and vacated the World Championship as a result.

=== In other promotions ===
In Mexican lucha libre promotions, intergender matches are more common in tag team matches. However, both male and female wrestlers are restricted to attack those of their own gender. Some tag teams of this kind are siblings (such as Cinthia Moreno and Oriental), trained simultaneously with the same instructor, or even are on a real-life relationship such as boyfriend/girlfriend (Cibernético and Estrellita) or, as an exceptional case, husband and wife (Billy Boy and Faby Apache). Lucha Underground has regular one-on-one matches between men and women, and Sexy Star held the Lucha Underground title for a day, after winning it in an elimination match and lost it to Johnny Mundo in an intergender match.

In one extreme, a 2011 intergender match in Japan had Kenny Omega wrestle with a nine-year-old girl named Haruka. Video of the match went viral, made international news, and led to Omega receiving numerous death threats. However, despite the match going to a time limit draw, Omega wrestled in such a way as to not harm the girl, and even allowed her to have most of the offense.

== See also ==
- Catfight
