= Marian Trimiar =

American boxer

Personal information
- Nickname: Lady Tyger
- Nationality: American
- Born: August 15, 1953 (age 72) Bronx, United States
- Height: 5 ft 4 in (163 cm)
- Weight: Lightweight

Boxing career
- Reach: 70 in (178 cm)
- Stance: Orthodox

Boxing record
- Total fights: 24
- Wins: 18
- Win by KO: 5
- Losses: 4
- No contests: 2

Marian "Lady Tyger" Trimiar (born August 15, 1953) is an American former professional boxer who competed between 1976 and 1985. Considered a pioneer in women's boxing, she became one of the first women to be granted a professional boxing license from the New York State Athletic Commission.

Trimiar began boxing training at 18 years old, after graduating from Julia Richman High School in Manhattan, New York. She fought in exhibition matches before it became legal for women to fight in sanctioned bouts. She was one of the first women to apply for a boxing license in New York State. In 1978, after a long lawsuit, Trimiar, Jackie Tonawanda, and Cathy "Cat" Davis were the first women to be issued a boxing license.

In 1979, Trimiar won the women's world lightweight championship versus opponent Sue "KO" Carlson in San Antonio, Texas. In 1987, she started a month-long hunger strike to advocate for increased pay and better working conditions for professional female boxers. She was a vocal supporter of making the sport more accessible to women. In 2021, Trimiar was inducted into the International Boxing Hall of Fame.

== Professional boxing record ==
24 fights	18 wins	4 losses
By knockout	5	0
By decision	13	4
No contests	2	

No.	Result	Record	Opponent	Type	Round, time	Date	Location	Notes
24	Win	18–4 (2)	Diane Clark	TKO	2 (6), 1:32	13 Mar 1985	National Guard Armory, Pikesville, Maryland, U.S.	
23	Win	17–4 (2)	Gwen Gemini	UD	6	3 Nov 1982	El Rancho Tropicana Convention Cente, Santa Rosa, California, U.S.	
22	Loss	16–4 (2)	Cora Webber	UD	6	15 May 1981	Circle Star Theater, San Carlos, California, U.S.	
21	Win	16–3 (2)	Margo Walls	TKO	8 (8)	19 Oct 1979	Lionel Roberts Stadium, Charlotte Amalie, U.S. Virgin Islands	
20	Win	15–3 (2)	Ernestine Jones	RTD	1 (4), 3:00	13 Jul 1979	Sports Arena, Los Angeles, California, U.S.	
19	Win	14–3 (2)	Toni Harris	RTD	1 (4), 3:00	23 May 1979	Starplex Armory, Washington, D.C., U.S.	
18	Win	13–3 (2)	Sue Carlson	UD	10	31 Mar 1979	Randy's Rodeo, San Antonio, Texas, U.S.	Won Women's World lightweight title
17	Win	12–3 (2)	Carlotta Lee	PTS	6	11 Feb 1979	Hawthorne, California, U.S.	
16	Win	11–3 (2)	Anna Pascal	UD	6	22 Sep 1978	Lionel Roberts Stadium, Charlotte Amalie, U.S. Virgin Islands	
15	Win	10–3 (2)	Diane Syverson	PTS	4	25 Aug 1977	Coliseum, San Diego, California, U.S.	
14	Win	9–3 (2)	Gwen Gemini	PTS	4	18 Jun 1977	Sonoma County Fairgrounds, Santa Rosa, California, U.S.	
13	Win	8–3 (2)	Gwen Gemini	PTS	4	25 Feb 1977	Coliseum, San Diego, California, U.S.	
12	Win	7–3 (2)	Lilly Rodriguez	PTS	4	17 Feb 1977	Olympic Auditorium, Los Angeles, California, U.S.	
11	Win	6–3 (2)	Lilly Rodriguez	SD	4	16 Dec 1976	Olympic Auditorium, Los Angeles, California, U.S.	
10	Win	5–3 (2)	Masako Takatsuki	PTS	4	30 Sep 1976	Olympic Auditorium, Los Angeles, California, U.S.	
9	Win	4–3 (2)	Diane Syverson	PTS	4	12 Aug 1976	Olympic Auditorium, Los Angeles, California, U.S.	
8	Loss	3–3 (2)	Theresa Kibby	SD	4	24 Jul 1976	Del Norte County Fairgrounds, Crescent City, California, U.S.	
7	Loss	3–2 (2)	Diane Syverson	PTS	4	22 Jul 1976	Olympic Auditorium, Los Angeles, California, U.S.	
6	Loss	3–1 (2)	Yvonne Barkley	PTS	5	24 Mar 1976	Arena, Philadelphia, Pennsylvania, U.S.	
5	Win	3–0 (2)	Gwen Gemini	PTS	4	13 Mar 1976	Providence, Rhode Island, U.S.	
4	Win	2–0 (2)	Margie Dunson	RTD	3 (4), 3:00	26 Feb 1976	Exposition Building, Portland, Maine, U.S.	
3	NC	1–0 (2)	Gwen Gemini	NC	4	28 Jan 1976	Arena, Philadelphia, Pennsylvania, U.S.	
2	NC	1–0 (1)	Gwen Gemini	NC	4	10 Jan 1976	State Armory, Waterbury, Connecticut, U.S.	
1	Win	1–0	Debra Babin	PTS	4	22 Dec 1975	Hotel Ambassador, Gatineau, Quebec, Canada	
