= Weight class (boxing) =

Measurement weight range for boxers

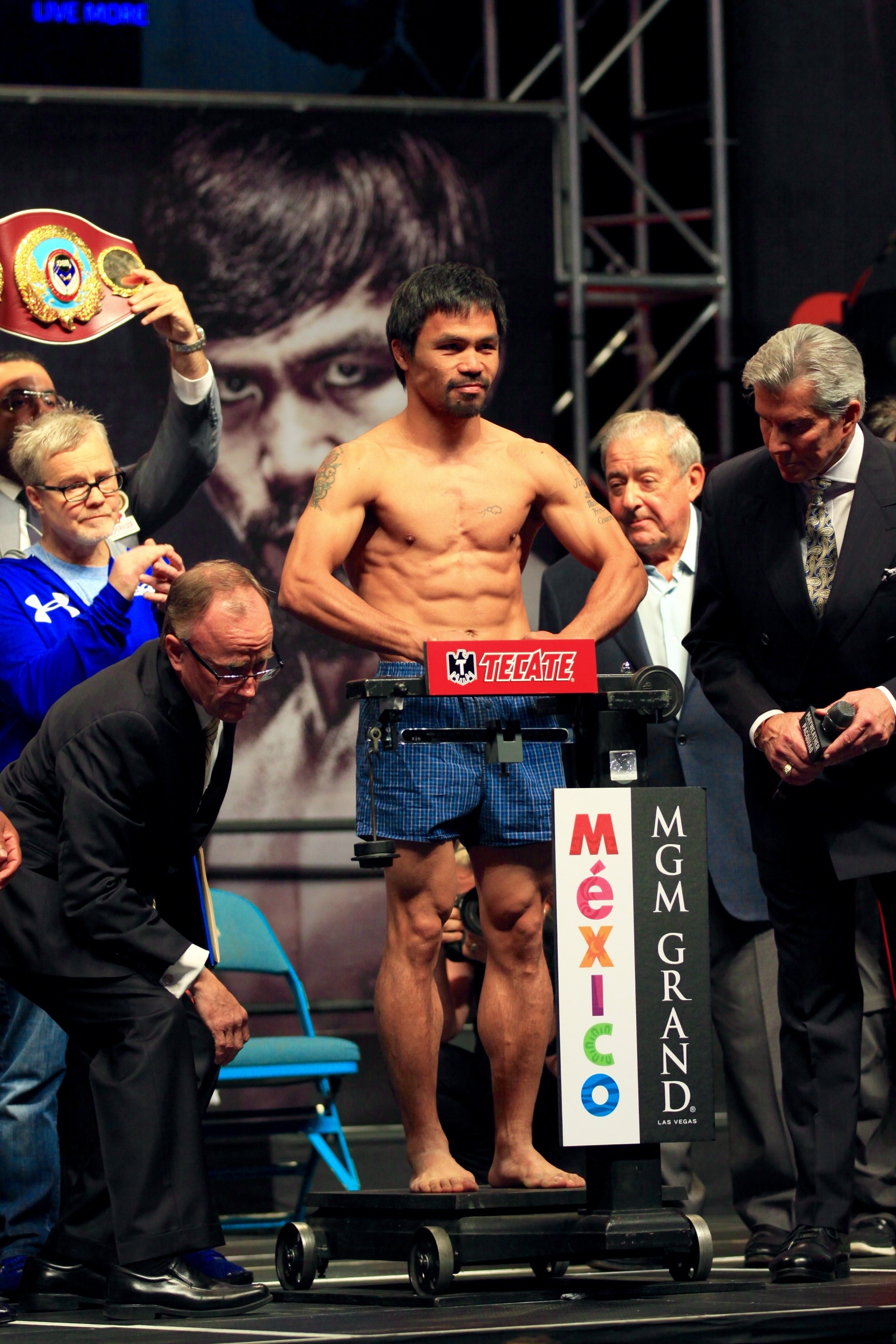
Manny Pacquiao has won world championships in eight different weight divisions, more than any other boxer.

In boxing, a weight class is a measurement weight range for boxers. The lower limit of a weight class is equal to the upper weight limit of the class below it. The top class, with no upper limit, is called heavyweight in professional boxing and super heavyweight in amateur boxing. A boxing match is usually scheduled for a fixed weight class, and each boxer's weight must not exceed the upper limit. A nonstandard weight limit is called a catchweight.

== Weigh-in ==
A boxer who is over the weight limit may strip naked to make the weight if the excess is minimal; otherwise, in a professional bout, one can try again later, typically after losing weight in the interim through dehydration by vigorous exercise in a steam room. If the excess weight is too great, the effort expended trying to "make weight" will make the boxer unfit for the fight itself. In such cases the fight may be cancelled with the over-weight boxer sanctioned or the fight may proceed as a catchweight non-title fight.

The International Boxing Federation (IBF) has a unique weigh-in policy in title fights. In addition to making the weight at the official weigh-in the day before the fight, the boxers are required to submit to a weight check on the morning of the fight. During this later weigh-in, the fighter must weigh no more than 10 pounds (4.5 kg) above the weight limit for the fight. If a boxer skips the morning weigh-in, or fails to make weight at that time, the fight can still proceed, but the IBF title will not be at stake. In heavyweight title fights, the second weigh-in is still mandatory, but since there is no upper weight limit in that class, a boxer can only be sanctioned for failing to submit to the weigh-in.

An amateur boxer must make the weight at the initial weigh-in; there is no opportunity to try again later. Boxers who fail to make their projected weights are eliminated from their bouts. There is a "general weigh-in" before the start of the tournament and a "daily weigh-in" on the morning of each of a fighter's bouts. At the general weigh-in, the fighter must be between the weight class's upper and lower limits; at the daily weigh-in only the upper limit is enforced. A fighter outside the limit at the initial weigh-in may be allowed to fight in a different class if there is space in the tournament. At major events such as boxing at the Olympics, there is a limit of one boxer per country per weight class.

== Culture ==
A boxer may fight different bouts at different weight classes. The trend for professionals is to move up to a higher class as they age, with muscle mass and bone density increasing over time. Winning titles at multiple weight classes to become a "multiple champion" is considered a major achievement. In amateur boxing, bouts are much shorter and much more frequent, and boxers fight at their "natural" weight. One boxer can be said to be better "pound for pound" than another if he is considered superior with due regard for difference in weight. Relative comparisons of the merits of boxers in different weight classes are a popular topic for boxing fans, with a similar speculative appeal to comparing sports figures from different eras; in both cases, the competitors would never face each other in reality.

== History ==
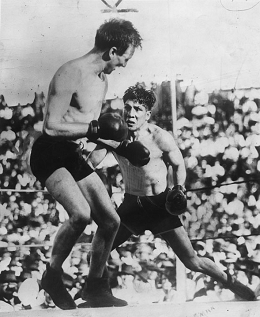
A boxing match in 1914 between Freddie Welsh and Joe Rivers in Vernon, California

In the early nineteenth century, there were no standard weight classes. In 1823, the Dictionary of the Vulgar Tongue said the limit for a "light weight" was 12 stone (168 lb, 76.2 kg) while Sportsman's Slang the same year gave 11 stone (154 lb, 69.9 kg) as the limit.

Size mismatches were dangerous for the smaller boxer and unsatisfying for the spectators. National and world titles could only become recognised if standard weight classes were agreed upon. Important sets of weight classes were those specified in 1909 by the National Sporting Club of London, and those contained in the 1920 Walker Law which established the New York State Athletic Commission (NYSAC).

After the split in the 1960s between the World Boxing Association (WBA) and the World Boxing Council (WBC), the divisions were narrowed, creating more champions simultaneously, and making it easier for fighters to move between different weight divisions. Among the professional bodies, the names of the new divisions are not standardized between different sanctioning bodies, although the cutoff weights are. These weights are specified in pounds, reflecting the historic dominance of Britain (and, later, the United States) in the sport.

=== Glamour divisions ===
Boxing has its own "Original Eight" weight divisions, also known as the "traditional", "classic", or "glamour" divisions. These divisions are the most prominent and widely recognized weight divisions in boxing. Manny Pacquiao has won world championships in the greatest number of the glamour divisions, winning championships in the flyweight, featherweight, lightweight, and welterweight divisions.

Divisions	Weights	Years established
Heavyweight	≥200 lb (90.7 kg)	+160 lb (72.6 kg) in 1738 by Broughton's Rules; established officially at +12 st (168.0 lb; 76.2 kg) in 1909 by National Sporting Club of London (NSC); +175 lb (79.4 kg) in 1920 by Walker Law; +190 lb (86.2 kg) in 1979 and finally +200 lb (90.7 kg) in 2003
Light heavyweight	168–175 lb (76.2–79.4 kg)	Established officially at 12 st (168.0 lb; 76.2 kg) in 1909 by NSC and 175 lb (79.4 kg) in 1920 by Walker Law
Middleweight	154–160 lb (69.9–72.6 kg)	Fights dating back to 1840s; established officially at 11 st (154.0 lb; 69.9 kg) in 1909 by NSC and 160 lb (72.6 kg) in 1920 by Walker Law
Welterweight	140–147 lb (63.5–66.7 kg)	145 lb (65.8 kg) in 1889; established officially at 10 st (140.0 lb; 63.5 kg) in 1909 by NSC and 147 lb (66.7 kg) in 1920 by Walker Law
Lightweight	130–135 lb (59.0–61.2 kg)	160 lb (72.6 kg) in 1738 by Broughton's Rules; 140 lb (63.5 kg) in 1889; established officially at 9 1/2 st (133.0 lb; 60.3 kg) in 1909 by NSC and 135 lb (61.2 kg) in 1920 by Walker Law
Featherweight	122–126 lb (55.3–57.2 kg)	118 lb (53.5 kg) in 1860 by London Prize Ring Rules; 110 lb (49.9 kg) and 115 lb (52.2 kg) in 1889; established officially at 9 st (126.0 lb; 57.2 kg) in 1909 by NSC and standardized at 126 lb (57.2 kg) in 1920 by Walker Law
Bantamweight	115–118 lb (52.2–53.5 kg)	105 lb (47.6 kg) in 1860 by London Prize Ring Rules; 116 lb (52.6 kg) in 1898; established officially at 8 1/2 st (119.0 lb; 54.0 kg) in 1909 by NSC and 118 lb (53.5 kg) in 1920 by Walker Law
Flyweight	108–112 lb (49.0–50.8 kg)	Established officially at 8 st (112.0 lb; 50.8 kg) in 1909 by NSC and standardized at 112 lb (50.8 kg) in 1920 by Walker Law

=== Tweener divisions ===
The newcomer weight divisions or "tweener divisions", mostly recognized with either a "super", "light", or "junior" in front of their names, took many years to be fully recognized as legitimate weight divisions in boxing. Manny Pacquiao has won world championships in four of these divisions; super bantamweight, super featherweight, light welterweight, and light middleweight.

	Weights	Years establishment
Bridgerweight	200–224 lb (90.7 - 101.6 kg)	Established and recognised by the WBC in 2020
Cruiserweight	175–200 lb (79.4 - 90.7 kg)	190 lb (86.2 kg) in 1979; changed to 200 lb (90.7 kg) in 2003
Super middleweight	160–168 lb (72.6 - 76.2 kg)	Established and recognized in 1967–1988
Light middleweight	147–154 lb (66.7 - 69.9 kg)	Established in 1920 by the Walker Law; recognized in 1962
Light welterweight	135–140 lb (61.2 - 63.5 kg)	Established officially at 140 lb (63.5 kg) in 1920 by the Walker Law; recognized in 1959
Super featherweight	126–130 lb (57.2 - 59 kg)	Established at 130 lb (59 kg) in 1920 by the Walker Law; recognized in 1959
Super bantamweight	118–122 lb (53.5 - 55.3 kg)	Established at 122 lb (55.3 kg) in 1920 by the Walker Law; recognized in 1976
Super flyweight	112–115 lb (50.8 - 52.2 kg)	Established at 115 lb (52.2 kg) in 1920 by the Walker Law; recognized in 1980
Light flyweight	105–108 lb (47.6 - 49 kg)	Established at 108 lb (49 kg) in 1920 by the Walker Law; recognized in 1975
Strawweight	105 lb (47.6 kg)	Recognized in 1987

== Catchweights ==
A nonstandard weight limit is called a catchweight. A catchweight may be agreed to for an individual bout—sometimes even for a championship bout—but championships are awarded only at the standard weight classes. For example, when Manny Pacquiao fought Antonio Margarito at a catch-weight of 150 lb (68 kg), the World Boxing Council sanctioned this as a title fight for jr. middleweight, whose limit is 154 lb (70 kg).

== Professional boxing ==
This table gives names and limits recognised by the four widely regarded sanctioning bodies (World Boxing Association (WBA), World Boxing Council (WBC), International Boxing Federation (IBF), and World Boxing Organization (WBO); the label used in data of both BoxRec and Transnational Boxing Rankings Board (TBRB); and by the magazines The Ring and Boxing News.

Bridgerweight has been recognised by the WBC since November 2020, and WBA since December 2023 under the "super cruiserweight" label, but is not currently recognized by any other bodies.

The date is that since which a continuous world title has been recognised by a major sanctioning body; some classes had earlier champions recognised intermittently or by minor bodies. One current weight class with only minor recognition is "super cruiserweight"; widely used as an informal descriptor, it is a formal weight class of the lightly regarded International Boxing Association at a limit of 210 lb; the IBA's cruiserweight limit is 190 lb.

Continuous since	Weight limit	WBA	WBC	BoxRec	The Ring	IBF	WBO
1884	Unlimited	Heavyweight					
2020	224 lb (101.6 kg; 16 st 0 lb)	Bridgerweight		–			
1980	200 lb (90.7 kg; 14 st 4.0 lb)	Cruiserweight					Junior heavyweight
1913	175 lb (79.4 kg; 12 st 7.0 lb)	Light heavyweight					
1984	168 lb (76.2 kg; 12 st 0 lb)	Super middleweight					
1884	160 lb (72.6 kg; 11 st 6.0 lb)	Middleweight					
1962	154 lb (69.9 kg; 11 st 0 lb)	Super welterweight			Junior middleweight		
1914	147 lb (66.7 kg; 10 st 7.0 lb)	Welterweight					
1959	140 lb (63.5 kg; 10 st 0 lb)	Super lightweight			Junior welterweight		
1886	135 lb (61.2 kg; 9 st 9.0 lb)	Lightweight					
1959	130 lb (59.0 kg; 9 st 4.0 lb)	Super featherweight			Junior lightweight		
1889	126 lb (57.2 kg; 9 st 0 lb)	Featherweight					
1976	122 lb (55.3 kg; 8 st 10.0 lb)	Super bantamweight			Junior featherweight		
1894	118 lb (53.5 kg; 8 st 6.0 lb)	Bantamweight					
1980	115 lb (52.2 kg; 8 st 3.0 lb)	Super flyweight			Junior bantamweight		
1911	112 lb (50.8 kg; 8 st 0 lb)	Flyweight					
1975	108 lb (49.0 kg; 7 st 10.0 lb)	Light flyweight			Junior flyweight		
1987	105 lb (47.6 kg; 7 st 7.0 lb)	Minimumweight	Strawweight			Mini flyweight	
2007	102 lb (46.3 kg; 7 st 4.0 lb)	Light minimumweight	Atomweight			Junior mini flyweight	Atomweight

== Amateur boxing ==
When the (amateur) International Boxing Association (AIBA) was founded in 1946 to govern amateur boxing, it metricated the weight class limits by rounding them to the nearest kilogram. Subsequent alterations as outlined in the boxing at the Summer Olympics article; these have introduced further discrepancies between amateur and professional class limits and names. The lower weight classes are to be adjusted in September 2010, to establish an absolute minimum weight for adult boxers.

Amateur weight classes also specify the minimum weight (which the same as the maximum weight of the next highest class). For safety reasons, fighters cannot fight at a higher weight. This also meant that even the heaviest weight class has a limit, albeit a lower bound. The lower limit for "heavyweight" was established in 1948 at 81 kg. When a new limit of 91+ kg was established in 1984, the name "heavyweight" was kept by the 81+ kg class, and the 91+ kg class was named "super heavyweight", a name not currently used in professional boxing.

Classes are as follows:

Class name	Weight class limit (kg/lbs)		
Class name	Men	Women	Junior
Super heavyweight	Unlimited	—	—
Heavyweight	92 kg (202.8 lb; 14.5 st)	Unlimited	Unlimited
Cruiserweight	86 kg (189.6 lb; 13.5 st)	—	—
Light heavyweight	80 kg (176.4 lb; 12.6 st)	81 kg (178.6 lb; 12.8 st)	80 kg (176.4 lb; 12.6 st)
Middleweight	75 kg (165.3 lb; 11.8 st)	75 kg (165.3 lb; 11.8 st)	75 kg (165.3 lb; 11.8 st)
Light middleweight	71 kg (156.5 lb; 11.2 st)	71 kg (156.5 lb; 11.2 st)	70 kg (154.3 lb; 11.0 st)
Welterweight	67 kg (147.7 lb; 10.6 st)	67 kg (147.7 lb; 10.6 st)	66 kg (145.5 lb; 10.4 st)
Light welterweight	63.5 kg (140.0 lb; 10.0 st)	63.5 kg (140.0 lb; 10.0 st)	63 kg (138.9 lb; 9.9 st)
Lightweight	60 kg (132.3 lb; 9.4 st)	60 kg (132.3 lb; 9.4 st)	60 kg (132.3 lb; 9.4 st)
Featherweight	57 kg (125.7 lb; 9.0 st)	57.5 kg (126.8 lb; 9.1 st)	57 kg (125.7 lb; 9.0 st)
Bantamweight	54 kg (119.0 lb; 8.5 st)	55 kg (121.3 lb; 8.7 st)	54 kg (119.0 lb; 8.5 st)
Light bantamweight	—	—	52 kg (114.6 lb; 8.2 st)
Flyweight	51 kg (112.4 lb; 8.0 st)	52.5 kg (115.7 lb; 8.3 st)	50 kg (110.2 lb; 7.9 st)
Light flyweight	—	50 kg (110.2 lb; 7.9 st)	48 kg (105.8 lb; 7.6 st)
Pinweight	48 kg (105.8 lb; 7.6 st)	47.5 kg (104.7 lb; 7.5 st)	46 kg (101.4 lb; 7.2 st)

At the Olympics, each weight class is a separate single-elimination tournament awarding one gold, one silver and two bronze medals in each weight class. The event format is geared so that the finals of all represented weight classes are held over the last two days of the competition, entrants that fail to win on the penultimate day being the Bronze medal recipients with the finals deciding Gold and Silver on the final day, all of the bouts are scheduled in ascending order of weight with the super heavyweight final last of all.

Each weight class conducts preliminary and qualification bouts, for all represented classes where the number of entrants requires multiple match-ups before the finals, with the match-ups of the lightest weight class requiring such fighting first and continuing with each subsequent higher weight class as required, further, second, third and fourth round match-ups may be required to complete the schedule using the same weight class progression to ultimately reach the final

== See also ==
- Brazilian jiu-jitsu weight classes
- Kickboxing weight classes
- Mixed martial arts weight classes
- Taekwondo weight classes
- Professional wrestling weight classes
- Wrestling weight classes
