= Horton Law =

1896 New York law regulating boxing (1896–1900)

The Horton Law, passed in 1896, was an early New York state law regulating boxing. It existed from 1896 to 1900.

== History ==
Until 1896, New York law criminalized prize-fighting and public boxing exhibitions. Boxing became legal (within regulated athletic clubs) only after the Horton Law amended Section 458 of the penal code.

The Horton Law was proposed as an amendment to the existing section of the penal code and reduced the prohibition by adding a legal route for gloved sparring exhibitions in New York. The bill read as follows: "A person who, within the State of New York, engages in, instigates, aids, encourages, or does any act to further a contention or fight without weapons between two or more persons, or a fight commonly called a ring or prize fight, either within or without the State, or who engages in a public or private sparring exhibition, with or without gloves, within the State, at which an admission fee is charged or received, either directly or indirectly, or who sends or publishes a challenge or acceptance of a challege for such a contention, exhibition or fight, or carries or delivers such a challenge or acceptance, or trains or assists any person in training or preparing for such a contention, exhibition or fight, is guilty of a misdemeanor."

The amendment also added the following: "Provided, however, that sparring exhibitions with gloves of not less than five ounces each in weight may be held by a domestic incorporated athletic association in a building leased by it for athletic purposes only for at least one year or in a building owned or occupied by such association." This permitted legitimate public sparring matches with five-ounce gloves to take place before the members of incorporated athletic clubs.

The Horton Law was enacted by the New York State Legislature and had been signed into law by State Governor Levi P. Morton, becoming effective August 31, 1896. It was named after New York Republican George S. Horton, who was chairman of the Committee on General Laws and introduced the bill.

== Boxing under Horton Law ==
Boxing under the Horton Law was not governed by a state athletic commission.⁣ Enforced by Chief of Police Peter Conlin, sheriff's deputies were occasionally stationed ringside to ensure compliance with the law. Conlin gave orders to shut down any boxing show where slugging was observed.

Once the Horton Law went into effect in New York, more athletic clubs came into existence. The Pastime Athletic Club of New York City held the first boxing show under Horton Law on September 1, 1896.

Authorities halted a bout between George "Elbows" McFadden and Joe Hopkins in October 1896 at the Clipper Athletic Club because the venue failed to meet Horton Law standards by not occupying the entire building. At the close of 1896, its first year in practice, 600 fights occurred, attracting 350,000 spectators over the year and generating $350,000 in gate receipts, split as $100,000 for the fighters and $250,000 for the promoters.

One of the last bouts under the state law was on August 31, 1900, with Joe Gans versus Dal Hawkins. They fought a 25-round match at the Broadway Athletic Club on the day before its expiration.

During the Horton Law's four-year span, over 3,400 bouts took place, primarily in New York City. The period saw many memorable bouts and shifts in championship titles across divisions. Under the Horton Law, which regulated professional boxing finances, fighters like Tom Sharkey earned $92,000, James J. Jeffries $90,000, Bob Fitzsimmons $75,000, James J. Corbett $65,000, Terry McGovern $60,000, and Kid McCoy $50,000, with a total of 3,500 fights generating $2,500,000 in public admission fees, of which fighters received $900,000 and promoters took $1,600,000.

The Horton Law was repealed by the Lewis Law, which took effect on September 1, 1900.

== See also ==
- Frawley Law
- Lewis Law
