= Lewis Law =

1900 New York law regulating boxing (1900–1911)

The Lewis Law was a New York state law regulating boxing. It was passed in 1900 and lasted until 1911.

== History ==
The Lewis Law was a repeal of the 1896 Horton Law, named after New York Assemblyman Merton E. Lewis, who prepared and introduced the measure to the 123rd New York State Legislature in 1899. Lewis, opposed to the brutality of prizefighting, pushed for fights for money prizes to be prohibited in the state of New York.

Without supervision of a state athletic commission, the Horton Law failed to provide proper oversight of boxing in the State of New York, opening the door for political manipulation. New York City saw a surge of politically connected boxing clubs, set up by Tammany Hall politicians and supported by police and gamblers. The politicians in New York assumed control, restricted club licenses to those they favored, and ran the sport with widespread abuse and corruption.

M. E. Lewis proposed repealing the Horton Law in January 1898, but Senator Timothy D. Sullivan and Assemblyman T. P. Sullivan, both involved in athletic clubs, blocked it, and committee revisions made it unworkable, leading him to drop it. Before announcing his plan to reintroduce the bill, Lewis had a conference with Theodore Roosevelt, then the newly elected Republican New York State Governor, who favored repealing the Horton Law. Roosevelt announced in November 1899 that he would use all his influence toward enacting the new law. He expressed strong views on the situation and insisted the contests must end if the General Assembly had the authority to make it happen.

The news of the repeal unsettled local athletic clubs and managers, leading to rushed conferences among fighters' managers and the organizers of recent high-profile bouts. With Tammany politicians controlling New York prize fighting, substantial funds were spent in Albany during the winter of 1899 to block the repeal bill, since the existing law had allowed prize fighting to flourish in New York more than in any other U.S. city.

On January 3, 1900, Roosevelt used his annual address to the New York State Legislature to call its attention to the Horton boxing law and recommended its repeal.

The Lewis Law passed the New York State Senate on March 28, 1900. The Senate approved the Lewis bill by a 26–22 vote. All of the senators voted except three, including Henry S. Ambler, Henry J. Coggeshall, and Michael J. Coffey. Acting on a motion by Senator Timothy E. Ellsworth, it cleared its final reading and received Roosevelt's signature.

With the Lewis Law in effect on September 1, 1900, boxing and sparring exhibitions, especially public contests or prizefights, were banned in New York until the Frawley Law restored legality in 1911. Although public bouts were illegal, sparring was permitted privately among members of athletic clubs.

== See also ==
- Horton Law
- Frawley Law
