= Frank O'Neill =

Frank O'Neill may refer to:

- Frank "Buck" O'Neill (1875–1958), American football coach
- Frank O'Neill (politician) (1893–1975), Australian politician and member of the New South Wales Legislative Assembly
- Frank O'Neill (swimmer) (1926–2024), Australian swimmer
- Frank O'Neill (footballer, born 1940), Irish footballer
- Frank O'Neill (footballer, born 1953) (1953–2024), Irish footballer
- Frank O'Neill (film director), director of The Overland Limited
- Frank O'Neill (jockey) (1886–1960), American Hall of Fame jockey
- Frank S. O'Neil (died 1945), American lawyer and athletic commissioner

== See also ==
- Frank O'Neal (1921–1986), cartoonist
