= Frawley Law =

1911 New York law regulating boxing (1911–1917)

The Frawley Law, passed in 1911, was a New York state law regulating boxing, which existed from 1911 to 1917.

== History ==
The Frawley Law was named after New York Senator James J. Frawley who proposed a similar bill as the New York Senate finance committee chairman in 1903. Local Democratic politicians continued to push for reform of boxing in 1911.

The Frawley bill was enacted by the New York State Legislature and signed into law by the Governor of New York John Alden Dix on July 26, 1911. The measure established New York as the first state to officially recognize boxing as a legitimate sport. Boxing, once privately controlled, came under state supervision with the creation of the New York State Athletic Commission. Three commissioners were granted full power to set rules for boxing bouts. Initially, commissioners served without salaries, but the succeeding commission was granted $3,000 each in 1915.

The Frawley Law outlawed prize fights but permitted regulated boxing in athletic clubs legally licensed by the commission, with a $10,000 bond required.

To curb brutality and potential corruption, bouts were capped at ten rounds, eight-ounce gloves were mandated, and a "no-decision" clause was enforced—meaning any fight that went the full distance would officially have no winner. Still, reporters often named their own victors, creating what became known as "newspaper decisions." Glove breaking and heavy bandaging were banned. Promoters lost the power to select referees, which was now handled by the commission. Fighters had to weigh in at 3 p.m., within six pounds of each other, and pass a medical exam. A ringside inspector and physician monitored each match, which referees could stop if it became uneven.

== Boxing under Frawley Law ==
The law went into effect in August 1911. On August 29, 1911, the New Polo Athletic Association, Madison Athletic Club, and Brown's Gymnasium were approved to host boxing under the new law, bringing the number of licensed clubs to six. Applications were reviewed at Chairman James E. Sullivan's home in Huntington, Long Island. Within a year the state commission had licensed about 90 clubs, the majority of which were located in New York City.

The first club to stage a card under the new law was the Fairmount Athletic Club which took place on August 29, 1911. The card featured Porky Flynn and Joe Jeanette. It was followed the next night by a Madison Square Garden bout between British champion Matt Wells and Valentine "Knockout" Brown before a crowd of more than 10,000 people.

The first knockout under the new law was seen when Jeff Burns faced Arthur Douglas.

On January 25, 1912, the State Athletic Commission suspended Abe Attell and his chief second, Danny Goodman, for six months. The penalty followed an investigation into the Attell–Knockout Brown bout and was the maximum for a first offense under the Frawley Law.

The first title under Frawley Law was won by Benny Leonard in a win against Freddie Welsh on May 28, 1917. The Frawley Law era ended with a middleweight title fight between Mike O'Dowd and Al McCoy on November 14, 1917.

The law proved to be a steady and profitable source of income for the state who received a 5% tax of the gate receipts which also covered all regulatory expenses. During the six-year span of Frawley Law, New York residents paid over $5,000,000 to watch exhibitions held in the state. Gross receipts totaled $235,373.75 for 1911, $983,826.20 for 1912, $773,596.95 for 1913, $636,913.55 for 1914, $804,101.81 for 1915, $1,066,468.25 for 1916, and $73,610.00 for 1917. Over the six years, the state took home $327,784.30 in taxes.

== Repeal of law ==
The law's early success gave way to exploitation by crooked promoters amid poor regulation, ultimately hurting both spectators and the sport. One of the first bouts attracted such a large crowd that admission prices were raised from $1 to $3 and then to $5, violating regulations. Corruption was rampant, with fixed bouts and schemes targeting patrons. Betting thrived, leading gamblers to exploit the unsuspecting with fixed fights.

Reports surfaced in 1916 that Fred A. Wenck solicited bribes from fight promoters to issue illegal boxing licenses. Following an investigation that led to the commissioner's removal, State Governor Charles Seymour Whitman launched a strong campaign against the Frawley Law. Months after the Wenck scandal, the first in-ring death since the law came into effect occurred in January 1917. Stephen McDonald was fatally injured in his debut fight against William "Toddy" Hicks. Whitman, outraged by the tragedy, intensified his push for an end to the Frawley Law. The repeal, called the Slater bill, was signed by him in Albany, New York, and by May 13, 1917, the commission was prohibited from granting new licenses. Senator Leonard Gibbs and other assemblymen voted against the repeal.

While the repeal was still pending, Governor Whitman assured that boxing would resume under the club membership plan. At the New York Capitol, he told reporters, "There is nothing to prevent boxing bouts in legitimate clubs or in one's home. Where bouts are conducted in legitimate clubs, for members of the organization there can be no objection, provided the contests are staged in an orderly manner. I see no reason why legitimate clubs should not have boxing." Referred to as a "club membership plan," bouts previously placed under the direct control of the state now had to be confined to regularly organized clubs with a legitimate membership system. Anticipating the repeal, many New York promoters and club owners started organizing under the membership system, updating charters and membership rolls. Brooklyn's Broadway and Clermont Sporting Clubs were among the first to announce their intention of continuing to lawfully hold shows for the benefit of club members.

The repeal of the Frawley Law went into effect on November 15, 1917. As a result of the repeal, the new statute made all participants in an unarmed fight—boxers, trainers, seconds, and promoters—subject to misdemeanor penalties.

Boxing shows were again staged by local club managers under restricted conditions. The New York State had its first boxing show on the "membership plan" on November 17, 1917. The new conditions were initiated at the Saturday night fights at Brooklyn's Broadway Sporting Club. The local police inspector and his staff monitored the three bouts attended by 1,500 members, but found no cause for interference.

== See also ==
- Horton Law
- Walker Law
