= Frank S. O'Neil =

American lawyer

Frank S. O'Neil was an American attorney who served as chairman of the New York State Athletic Commission.

== Early life ==
O'Neil's father, George F. O'Neil was a prominent Democrat and the publisher of the Binghamton Leader. He graduated from Columbia Law School in 1903 and was captain of the school's baseball team. O'Neil became a prominent lawyer in Binghamton, New York. He served a president of the Broome County Jockey Club, which owned the horse track on the Broome County Agricultural Grounds in Whitney Point, New York. In 1912, O'Neil left Binghamton to practice law in New York City.

== New York State Athletic Commission ==
In 1911 O'Neil was appointed to the newly created New York State Athletic Commission by Governor John Alden Dix. In September 1911, O'Neil led an investigation into the Madison Square Athletic Club over allegations of overcrowding, tax irregularities, and other issues that occurred during a fight between Matt Wells and Valentine Brown. O'Neil suspended the club's license until improvements recommended by Fire Commissioner Joseph Johnson were made to Madison Square Garden. The commission eventually revoked the MSAC's license and another club, reported to be run by Frank J. Farrell and Tim Hurst with O'Neil as a partner, took over fight promotion at the Garden. Boxer Al Palzer and promoter Tom O'Rourke accused O'Neil of taking $800 in exchange for approving a fight between Palzer and Jack Johnson. O'Neil denied the allegation, stating that he would never allow Johnson to fight in New York. In 1912, Bat Masterson accused O'Neil of being biased against the National Sporting Club and referee Patsy Haley, being a silent partner of the Madison Square Garden Athletic Club, demanding an excessive of complementary tickets from promoters, and associating with known criminal Jimmy Kelly. Despite the accusations, O'Neil remained on the commission and in 1913 was elected chairman. On October 8, 1915, Governor Charles Seymour Whitman removed O'Neil from the board after the commission failed to renew the license of the Show Corporation, which caused the cancellation of a fight between Willie Ritchie and Johnny Dundee at Madison Square Garden. He was replaced by sportswriter Fred A. Wenck.

== Conspiracy charges ==
In 1918, O'Neil was charged with conspiracy to obstruct the operation of the draft law. According to the prosecution, O'Neil was the mastermind behind a scheme to collect money from men who wanted to avoid military service. O'Neil claimed to have a "pull" with Army officers and would be able to have the men discharged or transferred to the Quartermaster Corps. O'Neil admitted to taking the money but contented that he had accepted it in exchange for presenting the appeals to the district draft board. On July 24, 1918, O'Neil and his co-defendants were found not guilty.

== Later life ==
O'Neil spent his later years traveling through Europe and South America. In 1933 he moved to Lordville, New York. He died on August 12, 1945, at City Hospital in Binghamton, New York. He was 67 years old.
