= Cumberland, North Carolina =

- Unincorporated community
- Location within North Carolina Location within the United States
- Coordinates: 35°00′18″N 78°58′02″W
- Country: United States
- State: North Carolina
- County: Cumberland
- Elevation: 184 ft (56 m)
- Time zone: UTC-5 (Eastern (EST))
  - Summer (DST): UTC-4 (EDT)
- ZIP code: 28331
- Area codes: 910, 472
- GNIS feature ID: 1019882

Cumberland is an unincorporated community in Cumberland County, North Carolina, United States. The community is located between Fayetteville to the north and Hope Mills on North Carolina Highway 59; parts of the community have been annexed by the two cities. Cumberland has a post office with ZIP code 28331.
