= Cathy Davis =

American boxer

Personal information
- Nickname: Cat
- Born: Cathrine Davis; 1952 (age 73–74) Winnfield, Louisiana, United States
- Height: 5 ft 10 in (178 cm)
- Weight: Lightweight

Boxing career
- Stance: Orthodox

Boxing record
- Total fights: 14
- Wins: 13
- Win by KO: 13
- Losses: 0
- No contests: 1

Cathy Davis (born c. 1952) is an American former professional boxer who competed between 1976 and 1981. Some of her fights were fixed.

== Career ==
Davis sued the New York State Athletic Commission (NYSAC) in 1977 because she was denied a boxing license because she was a woman, and the case was decided in her favor later that year, with the judge invalidating New York State rule number 205.15, which stated, “No woman may be licensed as a boxer or second or licensed to compete in any wrestling exhibition with men.” In his opinion the judge cited the precedent set by Garrett v. New York State Athletic Commission (1975), which “found the regulation invalid under the equal protection clauses of the State and Federal Constitutions”. The NYSAC filed an appeal of the ruling, but later dropped it.

In August 1978 Davis became the first, and, until Ronda Rousey in January 2016, the only woman to be on the cover of The Ring.

On September 19, 1978, Davis received the NYSAC’s first boxing license given to a female boxer.

Cat Davis did not only fight in New York. She fought between 1976 and 1981, in various areas of the country, including Nevada, California, and much of the Northwest. She became popular throughout the country by often fighting on television.

It was eventually revealed that some of her fights had been fixed.

== Partial boxing record ==
Officially, her first fight occurred on November 11, 1977, when she knocked out Margie Dunson in the first round, in North Carolina. On June 7, 1978, she and Ernestine Jones fought to a no contest in a bout that was scheduled for four rounds. On July 2, 1979, she knocked out Uschi Doering in the Exposition Building, in Portland, Maine, in 6 rounds.

== Professional boxing record ==
14 fights	13 wins	0 losses
By knockout	13	0
No contests	1	

No.	Result	Record	Opponent	Type	Round, time	Date	Location	Notes
14	Win	13–0 (1)	Lavonne Ludian	TKO	3 (?)	10 Apr 1981	Mid-Hudson Civic Center, Poughkeepsie, New York, U.S.	
13	Win	12–0 (1)	Ursula Doering	TKO	6 (12), 0:58	2 Jul 1979	Exposition Building, Portland, Maine, U.S.	
12	NC	11–0 (1)	Ernestine Jones	NC	4 (?)	7 Jun 1978	Municipal Auditorium, Atlanta, Georgia, U.S.	
11	Win	11–0	Margie Dunson	KO	1 (?)	11 Nov 1977	County Arena, Cumberland, North Carolina, U.S.	
10	Win	10–0	Mona Hayes	KO	4 (8)	14 Jul 1977	Holiday Inn West, Allentown, Pennsylvania, U.S.	
9	Win	9–0	Margie Dunson	KO	3 (6)	23 Mar 1977	Wagner Ballroom, Philadelphia, Pennsylvania, U.S.	
8	Win	8–0	Margie Dunson	KO	2 (6)	3 Feb 1977	Holiday Inn West, Allentown, Pennsylvania, U.S.	
7	Win	7–0	Joanna Lutz	KO	4 (8)	2 Dec 1976	Exposition Building, Portland, Maine, U.S.	
6	Win	6–0	Margie Dunson	TKO	3 (6)	25 Nov 1976	Exposition Building, Portland, Maine, U.S.	
5	Win	5–0	Jean Lang	KO	1 (4)	12 Aug 1976	Hinchliffe Stadium, Paterson, New Jersey, U.S.	
4	Win	4–0	Patty Patterson	TKO	3 (?)	3 Aug 1976	Arena, North Providence, Rhode Island, U.S.	
3	Win	3–0	Nickie Hansen	KO	2 (8)	29 Jun 1976	Seattle Center Arena, Seattle, Washington, U.S.	
2	Win	2–0	Joanna Luft	KO	2 (4)	16 Jun 1976	Silver Slipper, Las Vegas, Nevada, U.S.	
1	Win	1–0	Bobbi Shane	KO	2 (4)	15 Apr 1976	Exposition Building, Portland, Maine, U.S.	

== Bibliography ==
- A History of Women's Boxing, Malissa Smith, Rowman & Littlefield Publishers, 2014, ISBN 9781442229945
- THE GREAT WHITE HYPE By Jack Newfield - Published November 1979 Volume. One - Originally printed in the VOICE Vol. XXIII No. 41 "The Weekly Newspaper of New York, October 16, 1978
