= Walker Law =

1920 New York law regulating boxing

The Walker Law passed in 1920 was an early New York state law regulating boxing. The law reestablished legal boxing in the state following the three-year ban created by the repeal of the Frawley Law. The law instituted rules that better ensured the safety of combatants and reduced the roughness of the sport. The law limited matches to fifteen rounds, required a physician in attendance, restricted certain aggressive acts such as head-butting, and created a regulatory commission, the New York State Athletic Commission.

== History ==
James J. Walker, then the Democratic majority leader in the New York State Senate, successfully convinced his fellow lawmakers to approve a law allowing boxing events to be held in the State of New York.

Following the state's legalization of boxing, prominent figures started to show interest in the sport. The daughter of the President of the United States Woodrow Wilson organized a charity boxing event at Madison Square Garden to aid France after World War I.

Under the newly-established Walker Law, Tex Rickard's Madison Square Garden presented its first card on September 17, 1920. The first main event conducted under the new law was the Joe Welling vs. Johnny Dundee bout.

== See also ==
- Frawley Law
