= Fred A. Wenck =

American athlete (1879–1946)

Frederick A. Wenck (April 15, 1879 – July 26, 1946) was an American athlete, sports administrator, and businessman who served as chairman of the New York State Athletic Commission.

== Early life ==
Wenck was born on April 15, 1879, in Baltimore. He moved to New York City's Upper West Side in 1890. He attended the Barnard School for Boys, where he was captain of the football team. During the Spanish–American War he served with the 22nd New York Infantry Regiment. He graduated from Yale Law School in 1902. After college, Wenck spent many years as a sportswriter and editor. He worked on the staffs of the New York Evening Mail, New-York Tribune, and The Morning Telegraph.

== Athletic career ==
Wenck was a swimmer for the New York Athletic Club from 1896 to 1904. At Yale he was captain of the swimming and water polo teams and founded and served as the first president of the Yale University Swimming Association. He also captained the 22nd New York Infantry Regiment's football team.

== New York State Athletic Commission ==
On October 8, 1915, Wenck was appointed chairman of the New York State Athletic Commission by Governor Charles Seymour Whitman. On January 2, 1917, attorney Emil Fuchs sent a letter to Governor Whitman on behalf of boxing promoters Harry Pollok, Patrick T. Powers, and John J. White, who alleged that Wenck had solicited bribes in exchange for a license. Whitman appointed Franklin B. Lord to oversee public hearings into the charges. Lord cleared Wenck of the bribery charges, but found that he had borrowed money from a boxing manager, had recommended promoter John J. Mack to Fred Fulton’s manager for Fulton's fight against Al Reich and endorsed the note that allowed Mack to be financially able to promote the fight, had accepted a large number of free tickets for boxing and other events at Madison Square Garden, and allowed two companies to stage fights before they were licensed. For these reasons, Lord found Wenck to be unfit for office. On March 16, 1917, Whitman ousted Wenck based on Lord's recommendation. Whitman chose not to fill the office after Wenck's removal, as boxing was soon outlawed in the state.

== Business career ==
Following his removal from the athletic commission, Wenck entered the ferry business. He operated ferries on the Long Island Sound between New Rochelle, New York and Greenwich, Connecticut and points on the North Shore. He held the ferry and beach house concession for Glen Island Park and operated a ferry from New Rochelle to Glen Island. In 1936 he opened Wenck Marine Salvage Company in Port Washington, New York, which he ran until his death on July 26, 1946, at Meadowbrook Hospital in Hempstead, New York.
