= Jackie Tonawanda =

American boxer

- Born: Jackie Garrett; September 4, 1933; Suffolk County, New York, United States
- Died: June 9, 2009 (aged 75)
- Other names: Female Ali
- Height: 5 ft 9 in (1.75 m)
- Weight: 123 lb (56 kg; 8.8 st)
- Division: Lightweight
- Reach: 70.0 in (178 cm)
- Style: Boxing
- Stance: Orthodox

Mixed martial arts record
- Total: 1
- Wins: 1
- By knockout: 1
- Losses: 0

Jackie Tonawanda (September 4, 1933 – June 9, 2009), who dubbed herself "the Female Ali" and born Jean Jamison, was a pioneer American female heavyweight boxer in the 1970s and 1980s. Tonawanda was a well-known figure in the sport and was featured in many newspaper articles and magazines. While being dubbed, by herself, as the female Muhammad Ali, several sources claim that her story was largely made up and she had only 1 professional fight, against Diane Clark in a six-round fight in 1979, which she lost.

In 1975, Tonawanda sued the New York State Athletic Commission (NYSAC) for denying her a professional boxing license because of her gender. This resulted in the case Garrett v. New York State Athletic Commission (1975) at the New York Supreme Court (Tonawanda was also known as Jacqueline Garrett) which was decided in her favor. However, this did not overturn the law in New York against women boxing. But Cathy Davis sued the New York State Athletic Commission in 1977 because she was denied a boxing license because she was a woman, and the case was decided in her favor later that year, with the judge invalidating New York State rule number 205.15, which stated, “No woman may be licensed as a boxer or second or licensed to compete in any wrestling exhibition with men.” In his opinion the judge cited the precedent set by Garrett v. New York State Athletic Commission (1975), which “found the regulation invalid under the equal protection clauses of the State and Federal Constitutions”. The NYSAC filed an appeal of the ruling, but later dropped it. She was thus one of the first professional female boxers in New York.

On June 8, 1975, Tonawanda participated in the interstylistic All Martial Arts Tournament, part of the Aaron Bank's Oriental World of Self Defense show, held in Madison Square Garden, where she fought kickboxer Larry Rodania, knocking him out early in the 2nd round with a left to the jaw. She was the first woman to box in Madison Square Garden.

On June 9, 2009, Tonawanda died of colon cancer at Harlem's Mount Sinai Hospital.

== Mixed martial arts record ==
Professional record breakdown
1 match	1 win	0 losses
By knockout	1	0

Res.	Record	Opponent	Method	Event	Date	Round	Time	Location	Notes
Win	1–0	(United States) Larry Rodania	KO (punch)	All Martial Arts Tournament	June 8, 1975	2		Madison Square Garden, New York City, United States	
