= New York State Athletic Commission =

State government gaming commission

Commission overview
- Formed: July 26, 1911; 115 years ago (reestablished 1920)
- Preceding Commission: New York State Boxing Commission (1920–1921)
- Jurisdiction: New York
- Headquarters: 123 William Street, 2nd Floor, New York, NY 10038
- Commission executives: Matt Delaglio, Executive Director; Nitin K. Sethi, Chief Medical Officer
- Parent department: New York State Department of State
- Key documents: Walker Law; Article 41, General Business Law
- Website: dos.ny.gov/athletic-commission

The New York State Athletic Commission or NYSAC, also known as the New York Athletic Commission, is a division of the New York State Department of State which regulates all contests and exhibitions of unarmed combat within the state of New York, including licensure and supervision of promoters, boxers, professional wrestlers, seconds, ring officials, managers, and matchmakers. In 2016, the NYSAC was authorized to oversee all mixed martial arts contests in New York.

The commission is based in New York City.

== History ==
The NYSAC was founded in 1911, when the Frawley Law legalized prizefighting in New York state. The bill was signed on July 26, 1911, and that same day Governor John Alden Dix appointed Bartow S. Weeks, John J. Dixon, and Frank S. O'Neil to serve on the state athletic commission. Weeks declined to serve on the commission so James Edward Sullivan was appointed for the final seat.

The Frawley Law was repealed in 1917 and the state athletic commission was disbanded. In 1920 the Walker Law reestablished legal boxing in the state. In 1921, Governor Nathan L. Miller appointed William Muldoon, Frank Dwyer, and George K. Morris to reformed state athletic commission. The National Boxing Association (NBA) was established in 1921 by other U.S. states to counter the influence of the NYSAC. Sometimes the NYSAC and the NBA recognized different boxers as World Champion, especially in 1927–40. In 1962, the NBA renamed itself the World Boxing Association, and in 1963 the NYSAC supported the formation of the World Boxing Council.

Cathy Davis sued the NYSAC in 1977 because she was denied a boxing license because she was a woman, and the case was decided in her favor later that year, with the judge invalidating New York State rule number 205.15, which stated, “No woman may be licensed as a boxer or second or licensed to compete in any wrestling exhibition with men.” In his opinion the judge cited the precedent set by Garrett v. New York State Athletic Commission (1975), which “found the regulation invalid under the equal protection clauses of the State and Federal Constitutions”. The NYSAC filed an appeal of the ruling, but later dropped it.

== Rules and regulations (past and present) ==
=== 1929 Weights and classes ===
| Class | Weight (lbs.) | Weight (kg) |
|---|---|---|
| Junior Flyweight | 109 | 49.4 |
| Flyweight | 112 | 50.8 |
| Junior Bantamweight | 115 | 52.2 |
| Bantamweight | 118 | 53.5 |
| Junior Featherweight | 122 | 55.3 |
| Featherweight | 126 | 57.2 |
| Junior Lightweight | 130 | 59.0 |
| Lightweight | 135 | 61.2 |
| Junior Welterweight | 140 | 63.5 |
| Welterweight | 147 | 66.7 |
| Middleweight | 160 | 72.6 |
| Light Heavyweight | 175 | 79.4 |

=== Boxing Rules of Athletic Commission of the State of New York ===
(As published in Self-Defense Sporting Annual 1929, p. 14.)

=== Referee ===
- The referee shall order the power:
  - (a) To cast the third vote, in which case the three votes shall be of equal value. In the event of two votes coinciding, the result shall be so determined. In the event of all votes disagreeing, the contest shall be declared a draw.
  - (b) To stop a bout or contest at any stage and make a decision if he considers it too one-sided.
  - (c) To stop a bout or contest if he considers the competitors are not in earnest. In this case he may disqualify one or both contestants.
  - (d) To disqualify a contestant who commits a foul and to award decision to opponent.
- The referee shall not touch the contesting boxers, except on failure of one or both contestants to obey the "break" command.
- When a contestant is "down" the referee and timekeeper shall at once commence calling off the seconds and indicating the count with a motion of the arm. If the contestant fails to rise before count of ten, the referee shall declare him the loser.
- Should a contestant who is "down" arise before count of ten is reached and again go down intentionally, without being struck, the referee and timekeeper shall resume count where it left off.
- Should a contestant leave the ring during the one-minute rest period between rounds and fail to be in ring when gong rings to resume boxing, the referee shall count him out, the same as if he were "down."
- If a contestant is down, his opponent shall retire to the farthest corner and remain there until the count is completed. Should he fail to do so, the referee and timekeeper may cease counting until he has so retired.
- Referee shall decide all questions arising during a contest which are not specifically covered by these rules.

=== Judges ===
- The two judges shall be stationed at opposite sides of the ring. The decisions of the judges shall be based primarily on effectiveness, taking into account the following points:
  - 1. A clean, forceful hit, landed on any vulnerable part of the body above the belt should be credited in proportion to its damaging effect.
  - 2. Aggressiveness is next in importance and points should be awarded to the contestant who sustains the action of a round by the greatest number of skillful attacks.
  - 3. Defensive work is relatively important and points should be given for cleverly avoiding or blocking a blow.
  - 4. Points should be awarded where ring generalship is conspicuous. The comprises such points as the ability to quickly grasp and take advantage of every opportunity offered, the capacity to cope with all kinds of situations which may arise; to foresee and neutralize an opponent's method of attack; to force an opponent to adopt a style of boxing at which he is not particularly skillful.
  - 5. It is advisable to deduct points when a contestant persistently delays the action of a contest by clinching and lack of aggressiveness.
  - 6. Points should be deducted for a foul even though it is unintentional and not of a serious nature to warrant disqualification.
  - 7. A contestant should be given credit for sportsmanlike actions in the ring, close adherence to the spirit as well as the letter of the rules and for refraining from taking technical advantage of situations unfair to an opponent.
  - 8. In order to arrive at a true conclusion every point should be carefully observed and noted as the contest progresses, the decision going to the contestant who scores the greatest number of effective points regardless of the number of rounds won or lost.
- When neither contestant has a decided margin in effectiveness, the winner should be determined on points scored and aggressiveness.

== Miscellaneous ==
- 1922-06-01: Adopts rule prohibiting boxers under the age of 20 from participating in bouts of more than six rounds. Wenatchee Daily World (Wenatchee, WA, USA) wire report.
- 1932-01-08: Secretary Bert Stand announces that Battling Battalino forfeited his World Featherweight Title by stepping onto the scales overweight at 135¾ pounds, causing the first abandonment of a boxing match in the history of Madison Square Garden on the afternoon of the night on which the match was scheduled, and the "only parallel for the situation in modern boxing" since the Charley (Phil) Rosenberg vs. Bushy Graham 1927 title bout. Lew Feldman, Battalino's scheduled opponent, immediately claims the title. New York Times

== Members ==
- James Edward Sullivan (1911, chair 1911)
- Frank S. O'Neil (1911–1915, chair 1913–1915)
- John J. Dixon (1911–1915)
- James R. Price (1913–1915)
- Fred A. Wenck (1915–1917, chair 1915–1917)
- John Franey (1915–1917)
- Frank Dwyer (1915–1917, 1921–1924)
- William Muldoon (1921–1933, chair 1921–1924)
- George K. Morris (1921–1923)
- George E. Brower (1923–1929, chair 1924–1925)
- James Farley (1924–1933, chair 1925–1933)
- John J. Phelan (1930–1946, chair, 1933–1945)
- Bill Brown (1933–1943)
- D. Walker Wear (1933–1944)
- C. B. Powell (1943–1955)
- Eddie Eagan (1945–1951, chair 1945–1951)
- Leon F. Swears (1947–1955)
- Robert K. Christenberry (1951–1956, chair 1951–1955)
- Julius Helfand (1955–1960, chair 1955–1959)
- Francis J. Souhan (1956–1959)
- James A. Farley Jr. (1956–1965, 1975–1977, chair 1975–1977)
- Melvin Krulewitch (1959–1966, chair 1959–1966)
- Raymond J. Lee (1962–1971)
- Albert Berkowitz (1965–1973)
- Edwin B. Dooley (1966–1975, chair 1966–1975)
- Jackie Robinson (1971–1972)
- Kenneth N. Sherwood (1972–1976)
- Manuel A. Gonzalez (1973–1977)
- Floyd Patterson (1976–1983, 1995–1998, chair 1995–1998)
- Luis Rios (1977–1983)
- John M. Prenderville (1978–1983, chair 1978–1983)
- John R. Branca (1983–1984, chair 1983–1984)
- James Dupree (1983–1990)
- José Torres (1983–1988, chair 1984–1988)
- Rose Trentman (1985–2000)
- Randy Gordon (1988–1995, chair 1988–1995)
- Herb Washington (1990–1995)
- Mel Southard (1995–2001, chair 1998–2001)
- Marc Cornstein (1999–2007)
- Raymond Kelly (2001–2002, chair 2001–2002)
- Jerome Becker (2001–2007)
- Bernard Kerik (2002–2003, chair 2002–2003)
- Ron Scott Stevens (2003–2009, chair 2003–2008)
- Melvina Lathan (2007–2015, chair 2008–2015)
- Edwin Torres (2008–present)
- Tom Santino (2010–2013)
- John Signorile (2013–2018)
- Thomas Hoover (2015–2016, chair 2015–2016)
- Ndidi Massay (2016–2021, chair 2016–2021)
- Philip Stieg (2018–present)
- Don Patterson (2018–present)
- James Vosswinkel (2018–present)
- Lino Garcia (2021–present)
- Nick Perry (2025–present, chair 2025–present)

== See also ==
- Association of Boxing Commissions
- List of NYSAC world champions
