= Professional boxing =

Full contact combat sport

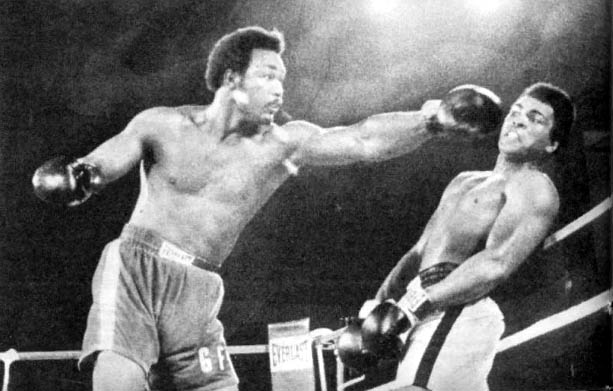
George Foreman vs. Muhammad Ali in 1974, one of the most famous fights in the history of professional boxing.

Professional boxing, or prizefighting, is regulated, sanctioned boxing. Professional boxing bouts are fought for a purse that is divided between the boxers as determined by the contract. Most professional fights are supervised by a regulatory authority to guarantee the fighters' safety. Most high-profile bouts obtain the endorsement of a sanctioning body, which awards championship belts, establishes rules, and assigns its own judges and referees.

In contrast with amateur boxing, professional bouts are typically much longer and can last up to twelve rounds, though less significant fights can be as short as four rounds. Protective headgear is not permitted, and boxers are generally allowed to take substantial punishment before a fight is halted. Professional boxing has enjoyed a much higher profile than amateur boxing throughout the 20th century and beyond.

== History ==
=== Early history ===
The June 1894 Leonard–Cushing bout. Each of the six one-minute rounds recorded by the Kinetograph was made available to exhibitors for $22.50. Customers who watched the final round saw Leonard score a knockdown.

In 1891, the National Sporting Club (N.S.C), a private club in London, began to promote professional glove fights at its own premises, and created nine of its own rules to augment the Queensberry Rules. These rules specified more accurately, the role of the officials, and produced a system of scoring that enabled the referee to decide the result of a fight. The British Boxing Board of Control (BBBofC) was first formed in 1919 with close links to the N.S.C., and was re-formed in 1929 after the N.S.C. closed.

In 1909, the first of twenty-two belts were presented by the fifth Earl of Lonsdale to the winner of a British title fight held at the N.S.C. In 1929, the BBBofC continued to award Lonsdale Belts to any British boxer who won three title fights in the same weight division. The "title fight" has always been the focal point in professional boxing. In the 19th and early 20th centuries, however, there were title fights at each weight. Promoters who could stage profitable title fights became influential in the sport, as did boxers' managers. The best promoters and managers have been instrumental in bringing boxing to new audiences and provoking media and public interest. The most famous of all three-way partnership (fighter-manager-promoter) was that of Jack Dempsey (heavyweight champion 1919–1926), his manager Jack Kearns, and the promoter Tex Rickard. Together they grossed US$8.4 million in only five fights between 1921 and 1927 and ushered in a "golden age" of popularity for professional boxing in the 1920s. They were also responsible for the first live radio broadcast of a title fight (Jack Dempsey vs. Georges Carpentier, in 1921). In the United Kingdom, Jack Solomons' success as a fight promoter helped re-establish professional boxing after the Second World War and made the UK a popular place for title fights in the 1950s and 1960s.

=== Modern history ===
==== 1900 to 1920 ====
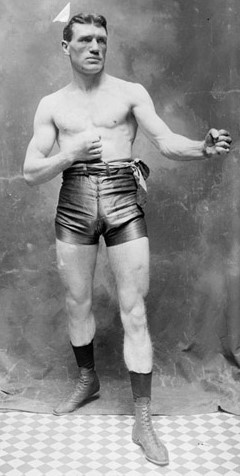
Philadelphia Jack O'Brien

In the early twentieth century, most professional bouts took place in the United States and Britain, and champions were recognised by popular consensus as expressed in the newspapers of the day. Among the great champions of the era were the peerless heavyweight Jim Jeffries and Bob Fitzsimmons, who weighed more than 190 pounds (86 kilograms) but won world titles at middleweight (1892), light heavyweight (1903), and heavyweight (1897). Other famous champions included light heavyweight Philadelphia Jack O'Brien and middleweight Tommy Ryan. After winning the Bantamweight title in 1892, Canada's George Dixon became the first-ever Black athlete to win a World Championship in any sport; he was also the first Canadian-born boxing champion. On May 12, 1902, lightweight Joe Gans became the first Black American to be a boxing champion. Despite the public's enthusiasm, this was an era of far-reaching regulation of the sport, often with the stated goal of outright prohibition. In 1900, the State of New York enacted the Lewis Law, which banned prizefights except for those held in private athletic clubs between members. Thus, when introducing the fighters, the announcer frequently added the phrase "Both members of this club," as George Wesley Bellows titled one of his paintings. The western region of the United States tended to be more tolerant of prizefights in this era, although the private club arrangement was standard practice here as well, the San Francisco Athletic Club being a prominent example.

On December 26, 1908, heavyweight Jack Johnson became the first Black heavyweight champion and a highly controversial figure in that racially charged era. Prizefights often had unlimited rounds and could easily become endurance tests, favouring patient tacticians like Johnson. At lighter weights, ten round fights were common, and lightweight Benny Leonard dominated his division from the late teens into the early twenties.

Championship-level prizefighters, in this period, were the premier sports celebrities, and any title bout generated intense public interest. Long before bars became popular venues in which to watch sporting events on television, enterprising saloon keepers were known to set up ticker machines and announce the progress of an important bout, blow by blow. Local kids often hung about outside the saloon doors, hoping for news of the fight. Harpo Marx, then fifteen, recounted vicariously experiencing the 1904 Jeffries-Munroe championship fight in this way.

=== Famous fights ===
Early years

- Few athletes embodied, from today's perspective, the unusual world of 19th-century athletisism as much as Jack McAuliffe. He defeated Jack Hooper outdoors in freezing temperatures and later described it as a miracle that both men survived the fight. His title fight against the Canadian Harry Gilmore took place in a hardware store that had a boxing ring. However, the ring only had ropes on three sides; the fourth side was a brick wall. This proved dangerous for both title contenders: McAuliffe "only" broke his thumb, while Gilmore hit his head against the wall and suffered a concussion. At that time (1887), Jack was recognized by most as the lightweight champion. Only a bricklayer from Birmingham named Jem Carney disagreed. He was the British national champion and feared on both sides of the Atlantic. This time, the duel was held in a dimly lit barn, lasted over five hours, and was stopped after 74 rounds. Ringside reporter A.D. Phillips reported on McAuliffe's technical superiority, while Carney possessed greater punching power. From the sixtieth round on, McAuliffe showed signs of severe fatigue and was nearly knocked out twice. Carney's supporters complained about the fight being stopped too early and an unfair decision that prevented a non-American from winning; McAuliffe's supporters, on the other hand, argued that the Englishman should have been disqualified for repeated kneeing.
- James John Corbett is considered a pioneer of boxing training. He placed great importance on technique and, due to his innovative training methods, was called the father of modern boxing. In May 1891, he faced Peter "Black Prince" Jackson. The fight lasted 61 rounds; no winner. In the autumn of 1892, he fought John L. Sullivan for the title. By then, his self-developed training proved useful: he had internalized a very strong defense, which allowed him to evade Sullivan's punches. After what was, by the standards of the time, only 21 rounds, he knocked Sullivan to the ground.
- The 1908 boxing match between Jack Johnson (boxer) and Tommy Burns in Sydney, Australia, was an important event in both sports and boxing history. After 14 rounds of Johnson's one-sided fighting, police had to interrupt the fight to stop anymore injuries to Burns. In the first round, it only took Johnson 15 seconds to knock Burns down. Johnson's win declared him the first African American world heavyweight boxing champion, breaking down one of the most profound racial barriers of the early 1900s. Johnson's victory over Burns, who had refused to take on Black fighters until public pressure forced the match, was a direct challenge to white supremacy at a time when segregation and racist ideas were prevalent. The fight was not simply an athletic competition but a political act which was Johnson's dominance in the ring and his strong rebellion outside of it shattered stereotypes of Black inferiority. His achievement inspired both pride in the Black community and resentment among many white viewers, setting off a wave of racial tensions and future "Great White Hope" campaigns to recapture the title. In the end, Johnson's win in 1908 was much more than a sports milestone. It was a courageous display of equality, strength, and resilience in the face of systemic bigotry.

1920 to 1959

- Chicago, late '20s. Gene Tunney was one of the first heavyweight champions who could move light-footed. Dempsey, by contrast, was an intense, energetic pressure fighter. His attitude, safety last, was loved by the audience; his aggression, legendary. "He looked as if he wanted to kill me. I never faced such eyes before," Tunney recalled. In front of over 100,000 spectators, Tunney managed to win many rounds, keeping Dempsey away with jabs and good footwork when necessary. However, in round seven, Dempsey slightly moved to the left to elude one jab and landed a right. That was enough to throw Tunney off rhythm and push him back toward the ropes. It was all Dempsey needed. Six quick punches later, he knocked Tunney down—but not out. Tunney got up after 14 seconds, as the referee had delayed the count until Dempsey moved toward a neutral corner. Tunney would go on to score a knockdown of his own and ultimately win the fight. The reign of Jack Dempsey, one of the most feared fighters ever, was over.
- On June 19, 1936, the German boxer Max Schmeling faced the undefeated "Brown Bomber" Joe Louis, who was considered the greatest boxer in history up to that point and thought to be unbeatable. Hardly anyone gave Schmeling a chance to defeat Louis – not even Louis himself, who paid little attention to his opponent. However, Schmeling, who followed the example of former world champion Gene Tunney by studying films of his opponent's fights, had discovered a weakness in Louis' boxing style. After throwing a punch with his left hand, Louis would drop it too low, leaving the left side of his face – especially his temple – unprotected. As a result, Louis had to endure brutal punches from Schmeling's right hand during the fight and was ultimately knocked out in the 12th round.
- When the year 1942 ended, Sugar Ray Robinson accumulated 125 victories, 40 as a professional. One of his opponents was the "Raging Bull". The second bout was in Detroit – his former hometown. LaMotta focused on body shots: From time to time a whistle sounded that nobody else ascribed importance to. Just one of the noises during a sporting event. But it was a calculated signal that rang every time to tell LaMotta that he was aiming too much at the head. The strategy proved successful: In front of 18,930 people, he landed a couple of hard blows to the stomach and the rips. In the eighth round, he hit him out of the ring. According to the renowned Ring Magazine, BoxRec, and Muhammad Ali, Ray Robinson is the greatest fighter of all time. The image of the best hanging on the ropes with a face distorted in pain circulated around the world.

1960 to 1979

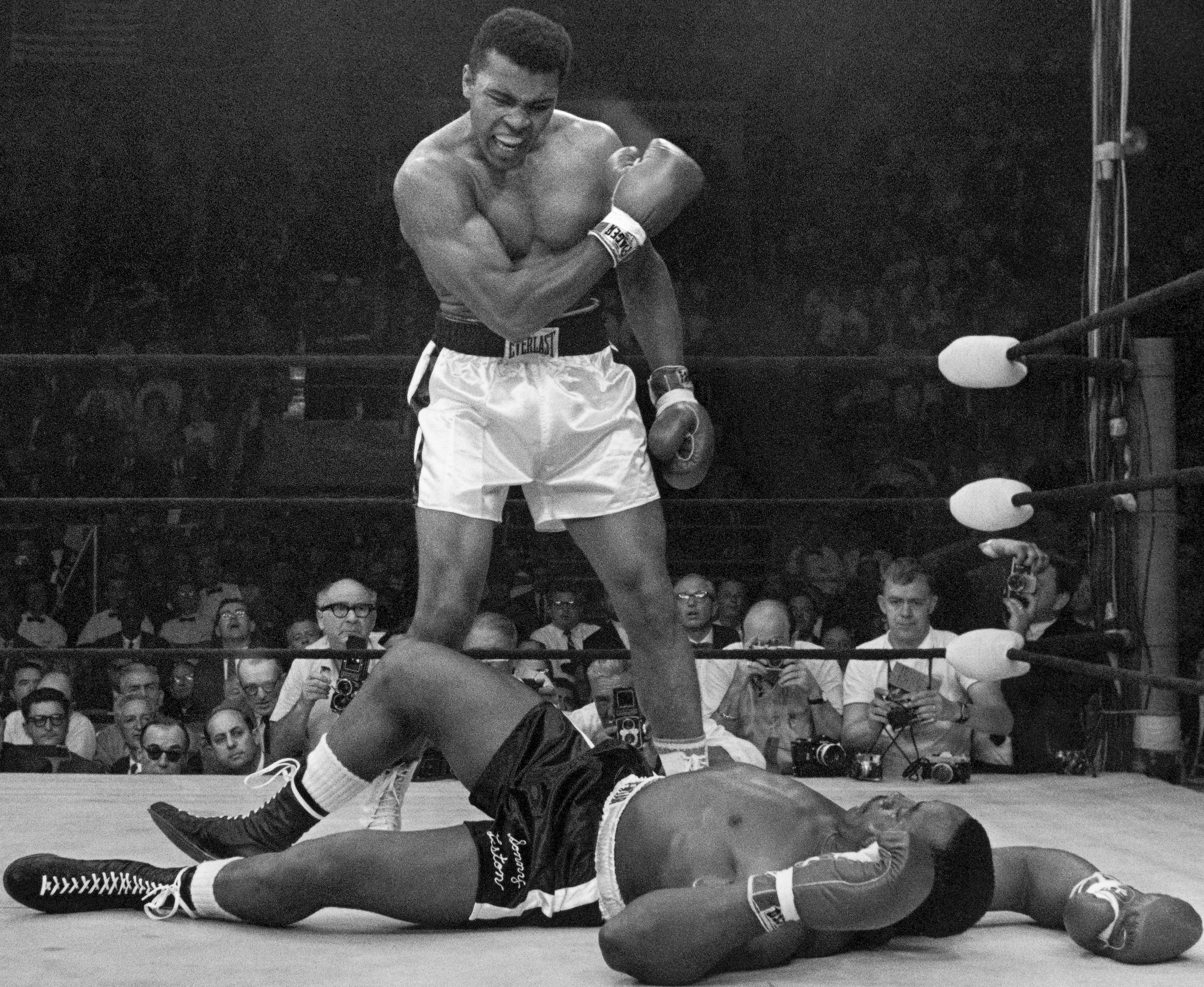
Muhammad Ali standing over Sonny Liston after the "phantom punch"

- February 25, 1964: Cassius Clay was offered the chance to fight for the title against Sonny Liston. The maverick was declared the winner in the seventh round. Liston wasn't able to hit the light-footed Clay and permanently received shots. A year later, May 25, the rematch took place. Clay, who had by then changed his name to Muhammad Ali, knocked Liston down in the first round and won. Many suspected fraud because they didn't see a clear punch. All the same, slow motion revealed that Ali landed a fast, sharp hit. This lightning-fast strike was called "Phantom punch". However, it is not believable that any boxer would have been knocked out by such a blow, especially not a world-class athlete like Liston.
- Because Muhammad Ali refused to serve in the military (it was during the Vietnam War), the boxing organizations stripped him of his titles; it wasn't until the 70s that he was allowed to box again. After two more or less easy fights he faced off with "Smokin' Joe" Frazier. This Fight of the Century brought together two undefeated boxers. It went down in history as one of the most spectacular title fights. In round 15, Frazier landed a mighty left hook and sent Ali down to the canvas. This knock down contributed to his win on points. Before the fight, Ali was using PR-methods in which he offended Frazier personally, that caused both competitors to become personal enemies.

1980 to 1999

- Four athletes helped define a golden age of welter- and middleweight boxing: Roberto Durán from Panama, Wilfred Benitez from Puerto Rico, Sugar Ray Leonard and Marvelous Marvin Hagler from the United States. In June 1980 Duran met Leonard. A direct confrontation with Duràn was considered too risky, after all, there was a reason they called him Manos de Pierna (hands of stone). Everyone expected Leonard to keep his distance. To everyone's surprise, the opposite happened: Again and again he voluntarily chose to fight from close range. In the end, Durán got the title and Leonard earned praise for his courage.
- A young, ambitious boxer with a unique style worked his way up the ranks and earned a title shot: Mike Tyson. Nicknamed "Kid Dynamite", he was just 20 years old and had an impressive record of 27 victories with no defeats. All his fights had ended by knockout or technical knockout, most of them within the early rounds. The same pattern followed in his title fight against Trevor Berbick. By the second round, Berbick already appeared exhausted. After another devastating punch, Berbick went down and the fight was over. This knockout became famous because Berbick attempted to stand up but kept falling repeatedly — a blow to the ear had severely disrupted his balance. Mike Tyson became the youngest heavyweight champion in history. Shortly afterward, he unified the WBC, WBA, and IBF titles, becoming the undisputed heavyweight champion.
- The undisputed champion defended his titles for three years. No one could stop him—not even Michael Spinks. The man from Missouri lasted only 91 seconds, despite being undefeated. Tyson, like many others, came to believe in his own invincibility. Personal problems and this overconfidence contributed to his sensational loss to Buster Douglas. February 11, 1990, became a nightmare for Tyson. He was the worse boxer that night, although he managed to knock Douglas down at the end of the eighth round. However, Douglas beat the count at nine and was saved by the bell. In the tenth round, Tyson was caught by a hard uppercut, followed by a series of combinations. Tyson went down, confused, fumbling for his mouthpiece. Many believed Tyson could have ruled the heavyweight division until the new millennium if he had stayed focused. Nobody expected him to lose—he was the overwhelming favorite.
- In March 1990, two extraordinary athletes faced each other in the ring: Julio César Chávez from Mexico and Meldrick Taylor from the United States. Chávez had an incredible record of 68 professional victories, while Taylor, despite his youth, was already an Olympic gold medalist and IBF champion. Taylor was determined to reach the very top. Spectators witnessed a thrilling contest where Taylor displayed dazzling hand speed. However, many of his punches missed their mark, as Chávez combined solid defense with smart evasive movement and responded with heavier, more punishing shots. It was a fierce, back-and-forth duel, where both fighters stood their ground and respected each other's abilities. In the dramatic final moments, the fight was decided in the last ten seconds — by knockout.

2000 to 2019

- Naseem Hamed had successfully defended his championship title ten times before stepping into the ring against Marco Antonio Barrera. Hamed was already famous for his unorthodox style: he often kept his hands low, relying on anticipation and almost serpentine flexibility. In addition to this nonchalant stance, he was gifted with immense punching power. Barrera, widely known for his thrilling and brutal battles with Érik Morales, was expected to use his relentless style against "The Prince". Many anticipated a non-stop clash, with Barrera refusing to back down. However, in April 2001, Barrera surprised everyone with a considered, disciplined approach, delivering a lesson in boxing technique. Despite the high level of skill on display, the fight had its rough edges: Hamed was penalized for holding Barrera's neck and wrestling him to the ground, while in the final round Barrera returned the favor, locking Hamed's arm behind his back like a policeman.
- Ricky Hatton fought Manny Pacquiao in the year 2009. He was already one of the best Englishmen that laced on gloves. The Philippine was in his prime in speed, punching volume and agility. Hatton chose an offensive strategy against the pound for pound best boxer in the world. It turned out to be a disastrous choice. In round one he went down two times. In the second he suffered a horrible knock out.

After 2020

- In August 2022, Naoya Inoue had a title unification against reigning WBO bantamweight champion Paul Butler. Butler fought very cautious against the first number one pound for pound Japanese boxer. Inoue occasionally held his arms out in a T position, gently urging Butler to come forward and stop retreating behind a tight, defensive guard. Later, he even dropped his hands completely and leaned in, sticking his head out - a bold gesture that was equal parts provocation and invitation. On this evening, the young man from Kanagawa Prefecture proved he was more than just a knockout artist, showcasing beautiful defensive skill as he slipped some punches by leaning his head subtly backward. Still, he knocked Butler out, becoming the first undisputed bantamweight champion since Enrique Pinder in 1972. He also made history as the first boxer to defeat all four major sanctioning body champions by knockout, and set a new record for most wins in unified bantamweight title bouts with seven, surpassing the legendary Rubén Olivares.

== Length of bouts ==
Professional bouts are limited to a maximum of twelve rounds, where each round last 3 minutes for men, 2 minutes for women. Most are fought over four to ten rounds depending upon the experience of the boxers and the significance of the bout. Through the early twentieth century, it was common for fights to have unlimited rounds, ending only when one fighter quit or the fight was stopped by police. In the 1910s and 1920s, a fifteen-round limit gradually became the norm, benefiting high-energy fighters like Jack Dempsey.

For decades, boxing matches went on for 15 rounds, but that was all changed on November 13, 1982, following the death of Korean boxer Kim Duk-koo in a fight against Ray Mancini. Studies following the fight have concluded that his brain had become more susceptible to damage after the 12th round. Exactly three months after the fatal fight, the WBC reduced the number of their championship fights to 12 three-minute rounds with 1 minute in between, making the total bout 47 minutes long.

== Scoring ==
If the bout "goes the distance", meaning that the scheduled time has fully elapsed, the outcome is determined by decision. In the early days of boxing, the referee decided the outcome by raising the winner's arm at the end of the bout, a practice that is still used for some professional bouts in the United Kingdom. In the early twentieth century, it became the practice for the referee or judge to score bouts by the number of rounds won by each boxer. To improve the reliability of scoring, two ringside judges were added besides the referee, and the winner was decided by majority decision. Since the late twentieth century, it has become common practice for the judges to be three ringside observers who award a score to each boxer for each round, with the referee having the authority to deduct points for certain violations.

At the conclusion of the bout, each of the three judges tallies the points awarded to each boxer. A winner is declared if at least two judges score the bout in favour of the same boxer. The result is either a (win by) "unanimous decision", by "majority decision" (if the third judge scores a draw), or by "split decision" (if the third judge scores the bout in favour of the other boxer). Otherwise, the result is a draw: a "unanimous draw" (if all three judges scored the bout a draw), a "majority draw" (if two judges scored the bout a draw, regardless of the result reached by the third judge), or a "split draw" (if each boxer was the winner on one scorecard, and the third judge scored a draw).

=== 10-point system ===
The 10-point system was first introduced in 1968 by the World Boxing Council (WBC) as a rational way of scoring fights. It was viewed as such because it allowed judges to reward knockdowns and distinguish between close rounds, as well as rounds where one fighter clearly dominated their opponent. Furthermore, the subsequent adoption of this system, both nationally and internationally, allowed for greater judging consistency, which was something that was sorely needed at the time. There are many factors that inform the judge's decision but the most important of these are: clean punching, effective aggressiveness, ring generalship and defense. Judges use these metrics as a means of discerning which fighter has a clear advantage over the other, regardless of how minute the advantage.

==== Development ====
Modern boxing rules were initially derived from the Marquess of Queensberry rules which mainly outlined core aspects of the sport, such as the establishment of rounds and their duration, as well as the determination of proper attire in the ring such as gloves and wraps. These rules did not, however, provide unified guidelines for scoring fights and instead left this in the hands of individual sanctioning organizations. This meant that fights would be scored differently depending on the rules established by the governing body overseeing the fight. It is from this environment that the 10-point system evolved. The adoption of this system, both nationally and internationally, established the foundation for greater judging consistency in professional boxing.

==== Usage ====
In the event the winner of a bout cannot be determined by a knockout, technical knockout, or disqualification, the final decision rests in the hands of three ringside judges approved by the commission. The three judges are usually seated along the edge of the boxing ring, separated from each other. The judges are forbidden from sharing their scores with each other or consulting with one another. At the end of each round, judges must hand in their scores to the referee who then hands them to the clerk who records and totals the final scores. Judges are to award 10 points (less any point deductions) to the victor of the round and a lesser score (less any point deductions) to the loser. The losing contestant's score can vary depending on different factors.

The "10-point must" system is the most widely used scoring system since the mid-20th century. It is so named because a judge "must" award 10 points to at least one fighter each round (before deductions for fouls). A scoring of 10–9 is commonly seen, with 10 points for the fighter who won the round, and 9 points for the fighter the judge believes lost the round. If a round is judged to be even, it is scored 10–10. For each knockdown in a round, the judge typically deducts an additional point from the fighter knocked down, resulting in a 10–8 score if there is one knockdown or a 10–7 score if there are two knockdowns. If the referee instructs the judges to deduct a point for a foul, this deduction is applied after the preliminary computation. So, if a fighter wins a round, but is penalised for a foul, the score changes from 10–9 to 9–9. If that same fighter scored a knockdown in the round, the score would change from 10–8 in his favour to 9–8. While uncommon, if a fighter completely dominates a round but does not score a knockdown, a judge can still score that round 10–8. Judges do not have the ability to disregard an official knockdown; if the referee declares a fighter going down to be a knockdown, the judges must score it as such.

If a fight is stopped due to an injury that the referee has ruled to be the result of an unintentional foul, the fight goes to the scorecards only if a specified number of rounds (typically four, but in contests of four rounds, once the third round begins) have been completed. Whoever is ahead on the scorecards wins by a technical decision. If the required number of rounds has not been completed, the fight is declared a technical draw or a no contest.

If a fight is stopped due to a cut resulting from a legal punch, the other participant is awarded a technical knockout win. For this reason, fighters often employ cutmen, whose job is to treat cuts between rounds so that the boxer is able to continue despite the cut.

==== Variants ====
Other scoring systems have also been used in various locations, including the five-point must system (in which the winning fighter is awarded five points, the loser four or fewer), the one-point system (in which the winning fighter is awarded one or more points, and the losing fighter is awarded zero), and the rounds system which simply awards the round to the winning fighter. In the rounds system, the bout is won by the fighter determined to have won more rounds. This system often used a supplemental points system (generally the 10-point must) in the case of even rounds.

== Championships ==
In the first part of the 20th century, the United States became the center for professional boxing. It was generally accepted that the "world champions" were those listed by the Police Gazette. After 1920, the National Boxing Association (NBA) began to sanction "title fights". Also during that time, The Ring was founded, and it listed champions and awarded championship belts. The NBA was renamed in 1962 and became the World Boxing Association (WBA). The following year, a rival body, the World Boxing Council (WBC) was formed. In 1983, the International Boxing Federation (IBF) was formed. In 1988, another world sanctioning body, the World Boxing Organization (WBO) was formed. In the 2010s a boxer had to be recognised by these four bodies to be the undisputed world champion; minor bodies like the International Boxing Organization (IBO) and World Boxing Union (WBU) are disregarded. Regional sanctioning bodies such as the North American Boxing Federation (NABF), the North American Boxing Council (NABC) and the United States Boxing Association (USBA) also awarded championships. The Ring magazine also continued listing the world champion of each weight division, and its rankings continue to be appreciated by fans.

== Major sanctioning bodies ==
- International Boxing Federation (IBF)
- World Boxing Association (WBA)
- World Boxing Council (WBC)
- World Boxing Organization (WBO)

== Citations ==
- Combat sports: Professional boxing championship rules; Government of Ontario. (2016, June 28). Retrieved November 11, 2018
- Did Lennox Lewis Beat Evander Holyfield?: Methods for Analysing Small Sample Interrater Agreement Problems; Herbert K. H. Lee, Cork, D., & Algranati, D. (2002). Journal of the Royal Statistical Society. Series D (The Statistician), 51(2), pp. 129–146.
- Rules for IBF, USBA & Intercontinental Championship and Elimination Bouts; IBF, O. (2015, June). Retrieved November 7, 2018
- WORLD BOXING FEDERATION RULES & REGULATIONS OF CHAMPIONSHIP CONTESTS; WBF. (2009). Retrieved November 6, 2016.
- ABC Unified Rules of Boxing; WBO, E., & ABC. (2008, July 3). Retrieved November 6, 2018.
