= Grant Park =

Grant Park may refer to:

== United States ==
- Grant Park, Atlanta, the oldest city park in Atlanta, Georgia
- Grant Park, Bar Harbor, Maine
- Grant Park (Chicago), a large urban park in Chicago, Illinois
- Grant Park, Illinois, a village in Kankakee County, Illinois
- Grant Park (Milwaukee), an urban park in South Milwaukee, Wisconsin
- Grant Park, Portland, Oregon, a neighborhood in Portland, Oregon
- Grant Park (Portland, Oregon), a public park in Portland, Oregon
- Grant Park (Tampa), a neighborhood in Tampa, Florida
- Grant Park, a neighborhood in Washington, D.C.

== Elsewhere ==
- Grant Park, a football ground in Lossiemouth, Scotland, home of Lossiemouth F.C.
- Grant Park, Winnipeg, a neighbourhood in Manitoba, Canada
- Grant Park Shopping Centre
- Grant Park Music Festival
- Grant Park Symphony Orchestra
- Grant Park High School
