= Grant Park, Winnipeg =

Neighborhood in Winnipeg, Manitoba, Canada

- Neighbourhood
- Interactive map of Grant Park, Winnipeg
- Coordinates: 49°51′21″N 97°09′46″W
- Country: Canada
- Province: Manitoba
- City: Winnipeg
- Ward: River Heights – Fort Garry
- Named for: James McTavish Grant (1881-1959)

Area
  - Total: 1.4 km^{2} (0.54 sq mi)

Population (2016)
  - Total: 2,725
  - Density: 1,900/km^{2} (5,000/sq mi)
- Area codes: Area codes 204 and 431

Grant Park is a neighbourhood in the River Heights area of southern Winnipeg, Manitoba. Its general boundaries are Grant Avenue to the north, Stafford Street to the east, the CNR Mainline to the south, and Cambridge Street to the west.

== History ==
The Grant Park neighbourhood was one of the last areas in the former City of Winnipeg to develop.

The land around what would become Grant Avenue—now one of Grant Park's most prominent streets—was first developed with the introduction of the Harte Subdivision for the Grand Trunk Pacific Railway (later Canadian National Railway) in 1908. When the ground of the railway track sank between Pembina Highway and Cambridge Street, the builders had to refix it with cement, rocks, and gravel. This track was later declared surplus and sold to the City. The tracks were removed, the ground was redone, the street expanded to include a service road and renamed Grant Avenue.

From the early 1900s to 1960, some of the area along the rail line in present-day Grant Avenue became home to a Métis shanty town known as Rooster Town. At its peak in the 1930s, Rooster Town reached from Winnipeg's Stafford Street to Lindsay Street. Following World War II, with the uniquely fast rate at which Winnipeg was suburbanizing, development on cheap land just north of Rooster Town lead to new homes beginning to infringe on Rooster Town territory. In 1949, the children of Rooster Town saw their first opportunity to receive an education, with the construction of Rockwood School in the northeast corner of the settlement.

In the late 1950s, residents of Rooster Town were pressured to relocate their homes in order to make way for the construction of a new shopping centre, today's Grant Park Shopping Centre. In 1959, the remaining residents were evicted and their homes were burnt or torn down. Chiefly because of the presence of Rockwood School and Grant Park High School (opened in 1959), the neighbourhood around the schools became more organized. Finally, by the early 1960s, Rooster Town was absorbed by a new middle-class suburb of ratepayers.

In the late 1960s, construction for the Grant Park Shopping Centre complex was complete; it originally featured a Woolco, Gambles, Safeway, and Dominion stores. The Pan Am Pool was also built during this time so that Winnipeg could host the 1967 Pan American Games. Until 2006, Pan Am was home to the Canadian Aquatic Hall of Fame. Also around the same time that the shopping centre and pool were being constructed, various mid-rise and high-rise apartment buildings were being built. Some of the apartment blocks have undergone major interior and exterior renovations.

== Demographics ==
As of the 2006 Census, the population of the Grant Park neighbourhood was 2,700 people, which grew to 2,725 by the 2016 Census. Nearly 40% of the population are a visible minority, and 8% of them are Aboriginal. Almost 21% of the people are not affiliated with any religions. The average household income in the area is CA$57,477.

Minority groups in Grant Park, Winnipeg
Population group		2006		2016	
Population group		Population	% of total population	Population	% of total population
Non-visible minority (White)		1,965	72.8%		
Visible minority group	Filipino	105	21.2%	425	41.7%
Visible minority group	South Asian	65	2.4%	160	15.7%
Visible minority group	Chinese	110	22.2%	95	9.3%
Visible minority group	Korean	50	10.1%	90	8.8%
Visible minority group	Black	75	2.8%	85	8.3%
Visible minority group	Latin American	65	2.4%	45	4.4%
Visible minority group	Arab	0	0%	10	1.0%
Visible minority group	West Asian	0	0%	30	2.9%
Visible minority group	Southeast Asian	0	0%	20	2.0%
Visible minority group	Japanese	15	3.0%	0	0%
Visible minority group	Other	0	0%	10	1.0%
Visible minority group	Multiple visible minorities	10	2.0%	50	4.9%
Total visible minority population		495	18.3%	1,020	37.4%
Aboriginal group	First Nations (North American Indian)	75	31.3%	75	31.9%
Aboriginal group	Métis	165	68.8%	150	63.8%
Aboriginal group	Inuk (Inuit)	0	0%	0	0%
Aboriginal group	Aboriginal, n.i.e.	0	0%	0	0%
Aboriginal group	Multiple Aboriginal identities	0	0%	10	4.3%
Total Aboriginal population		240	8.9%	225	8.3%
Total population		2700	100%	2,725	100%

== Points of interest ==
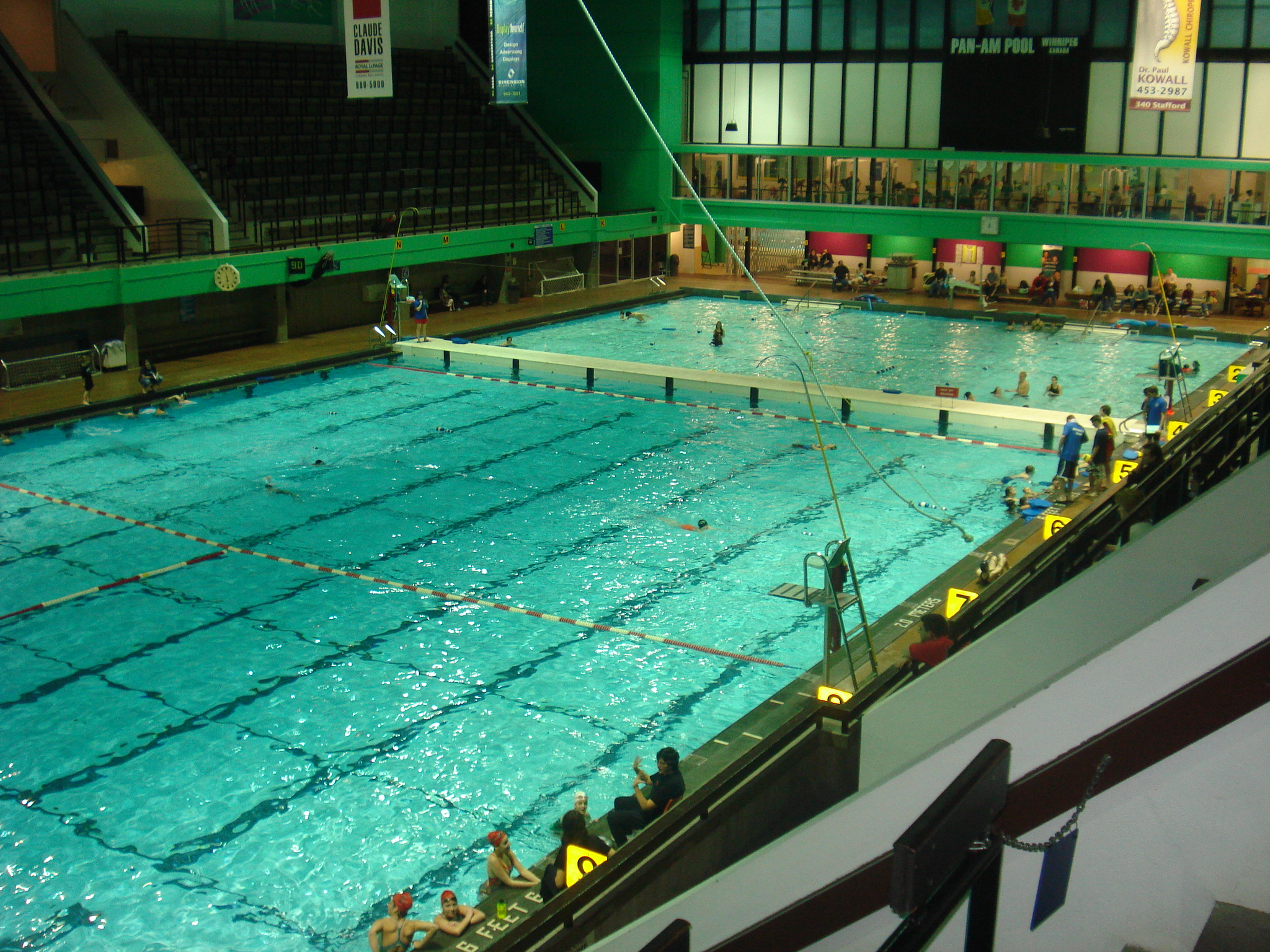
Pan Am Pool

- Pan Am Pool
- Grant Park Shopping Centre
- Grant Park High School
- Manitoba Electrical Museum
- Manitoba Hydro, 820 Taylor Ave.
- CN Mainline
- Between 1976 and the mid-1990s, Winnipeg Videon had their administration and head offices located in the area, at 651 & 657 Stafford Street.

== See also ==
- 1999 Pan American Games
