= Shore Path =

Coastal path in Maine, USA

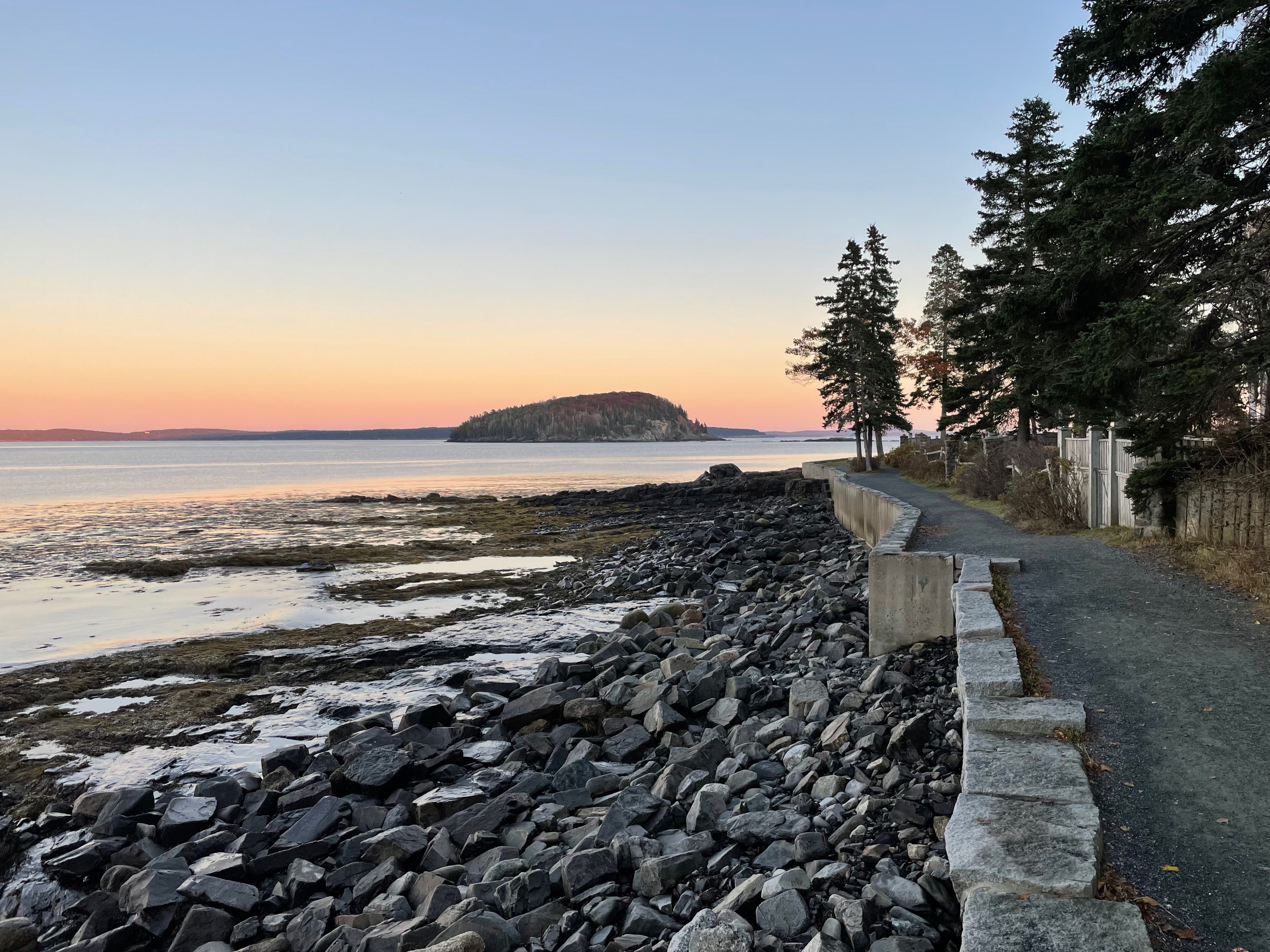
- The path in its southern stretch, looking out to Bald Porcupine Island in Frenchman Bay
- Length: 1.2 km (0.75 mi)
- Location: Bar Harbor, Maine, U.S.
- Established: 1881 (145 years ago)
- Use: Walking; Running
- Difficulty: Easy
- Season: All year
- Sights: Frenchman Bay; Porcupine Islands

The Shore Path is a coastal path in Bar Harbor, Maine, United States. Established in 1881, it runs along the shore of Frenchman Bay, from Ells Pier, beside Agamont Park, in the north to an east–west-running continuation of the path at the eastern end of Wayman Lane. To the west of the path, mostly in its southern section, are the properties of several of Bar Harbor's historic "cottages". Several exits along its route lead through to Bar Harbor's Main Street, about 0.3 miles (0.48 km) away at its most distant point. Cycling is not permitted on the Shore Path.

Balance Rock, deposited during an ice age, is located on the shore beside the path.

Between 2012 and 2016, Bar Harbor's Village Improvement Association (VIA) spent $150,000 repairing and improving 1,200 feet (370 m) of the Shore Path. This work included resurfacing the gravel path and rebuilding seawalls. A new bench commemorating the donor of Glen Mary Park, Mary Shannon, was installed in the fall of 2014. The VIA pledged another $30,000 to improve the path in front of Grant Park, which was redone in coordination with the redevelopment of the park in 2017.

In January 2024, the path suffered extensive damage during a storm. It kept the path closed into the summer.

== Route description ==
From the town pier, the path runs east initially, then south after it passes the lawn of the Bar Harbor Inn and Uncle Steve's Point. Grant Park is next, just north of the Balance Rock Inn. An exit, leading to Main Street's village green via Albert Meadow, is here. Continuing, past the Tudor Revival-style John Innes Kane Cottage (built in 1904), another (less obvious) exit to Main Street, via Hancock Street, appears. The southern end of the path is marked with a turn leading to Wayman Lane.

== Gallery ==
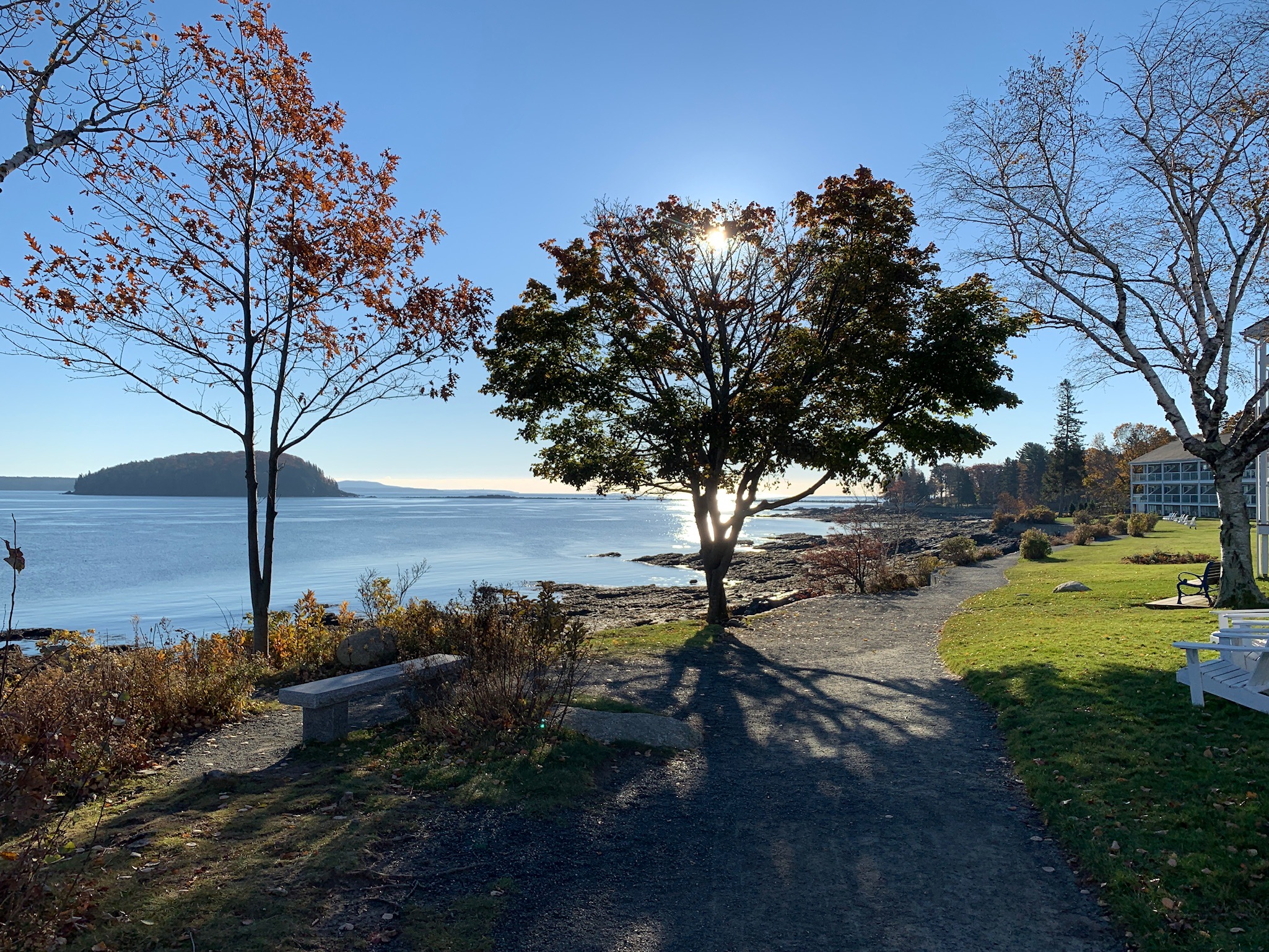
A few feet from the northern end of the path, beside the Bar Harbor Inn

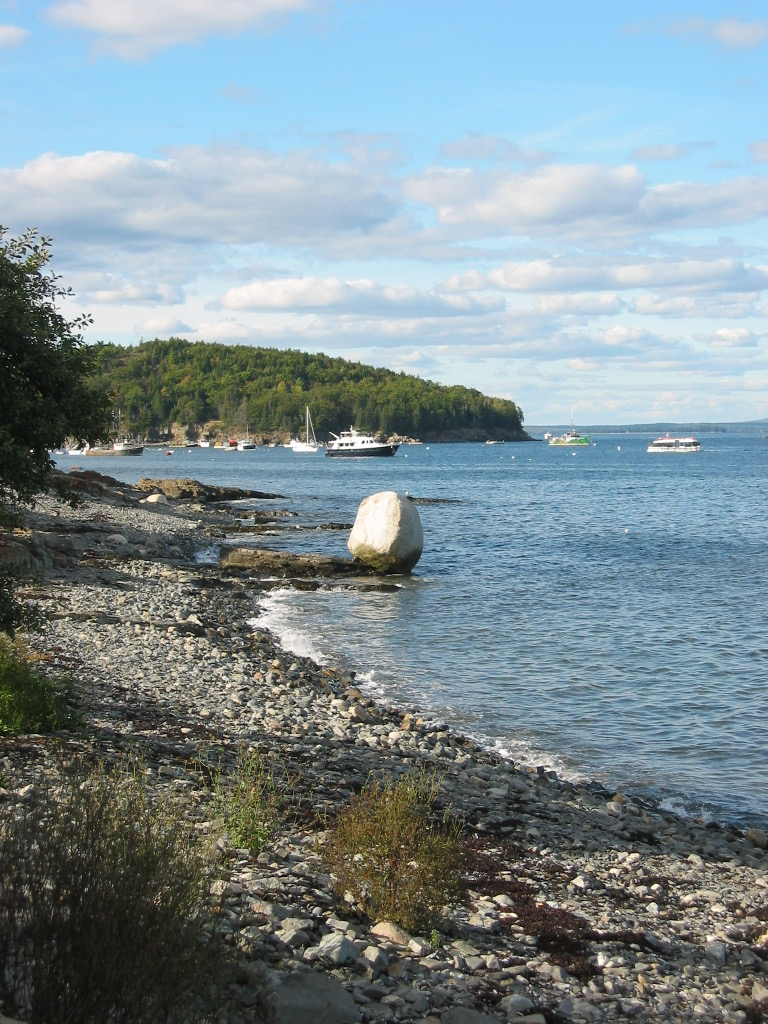
Balance Rock, looking north to Bar Island

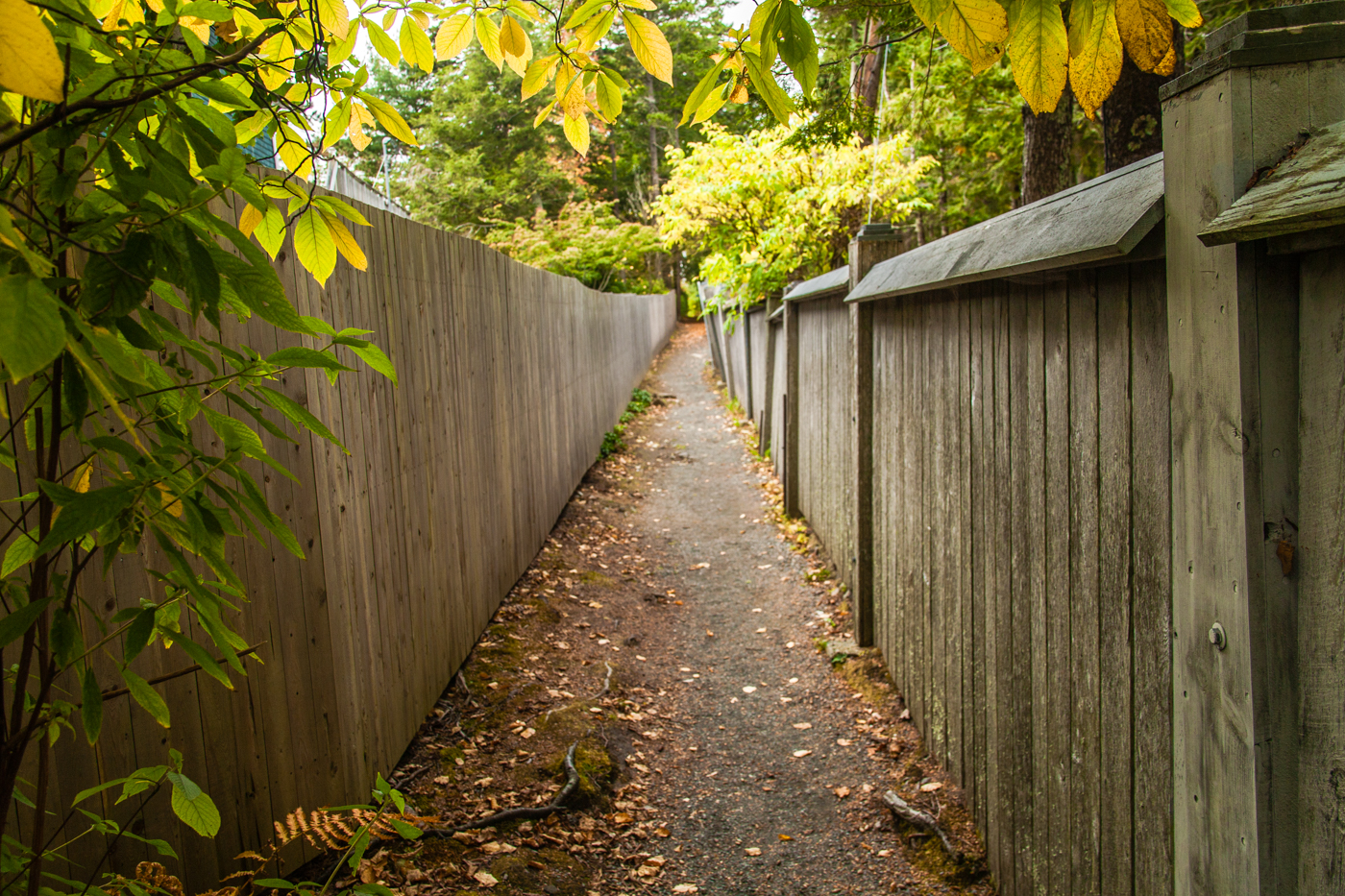
The path to Main Street via Hancock Street
