= Balance Rock Inn =

Hotel in Bar Harbor, Maine

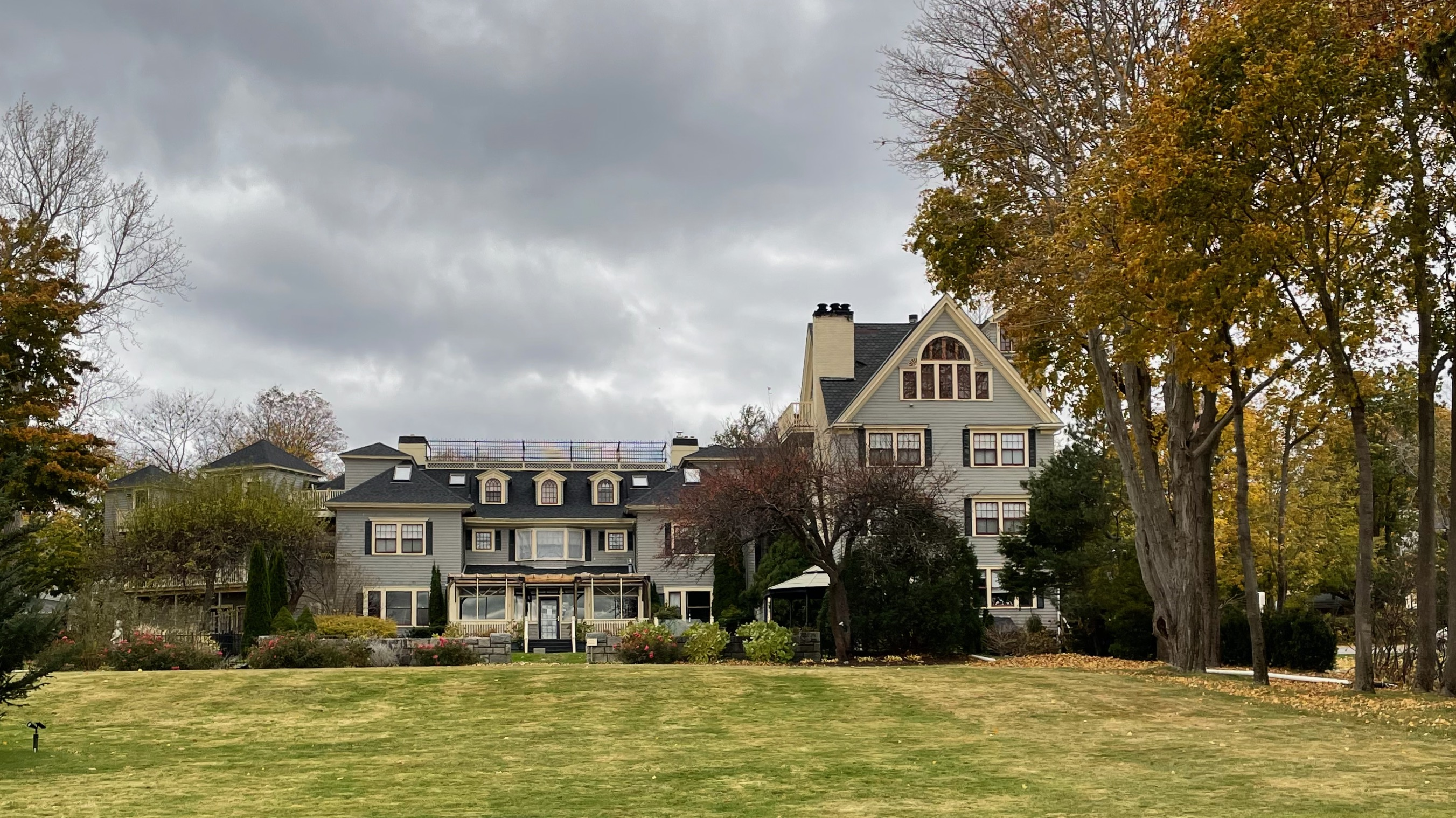
- The rear of the hotel, viewed from Bar Harbor's Shore Path, 2021
- Interactive map of the Balance Rock Inn area

General information
- Location: Bar Harbor, Maine, 21 Albert Meadow; Bar Harbor, Maine 04609
- Coordinates: 44.3884°N 68.2013°W
- Opening: 1903 (123 years ago)

Technical details
- Floor count: 3

Design and construction
- Architect: Andrews, Jaques & Rantoul

Other information
- Number of rooms: 27
- Number of restaurants: 1

Website
- www.balancerockinn.com

The Balance Rock Inn is a boutique hotel in the American town of Bar Harbor, Maine. AAA Four Diamond-rated, the structure was built in 1903 as a home for Scottish railroad tycoon Alexander Maitland. Maitland was Henry Flagler's partner in the Florida East Coast Railway. The hotel is named for Balance Rock, a nearby boulder deposited during an ice age on a slender stone fulcrum just off Bar Harbor's Shore Path.

The hotel, which was expanded to 27 rooms in 1995, is constructed in the shingle style and was designed by the noted architectural firm Andrews, Jaques & Rantoul. Its restaurant is called The Veranda.

Situated at the eastern end of Albert Meadow, a cul-de-sac off Bar Harbor's Main Street, the hotel stands adjacent to Grant Park and overlooks Frenchman Bay and its Porcupine Islands.

== Gallery ==
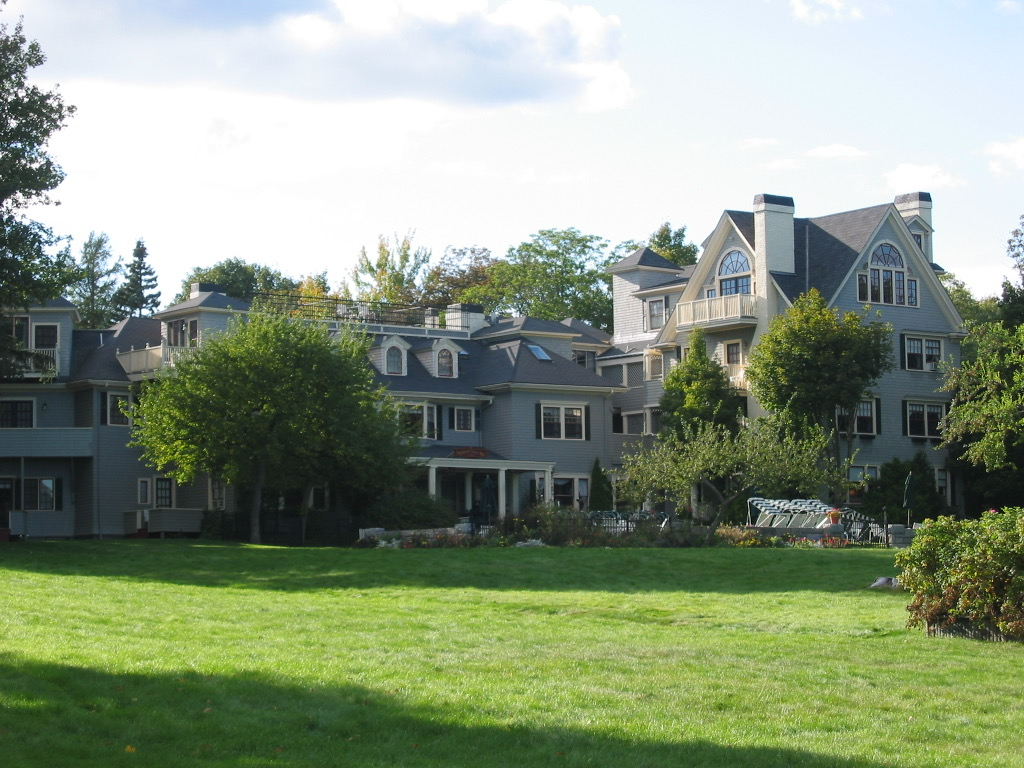
The hotel viewed from Bar Harbor's Shore Path in 2006

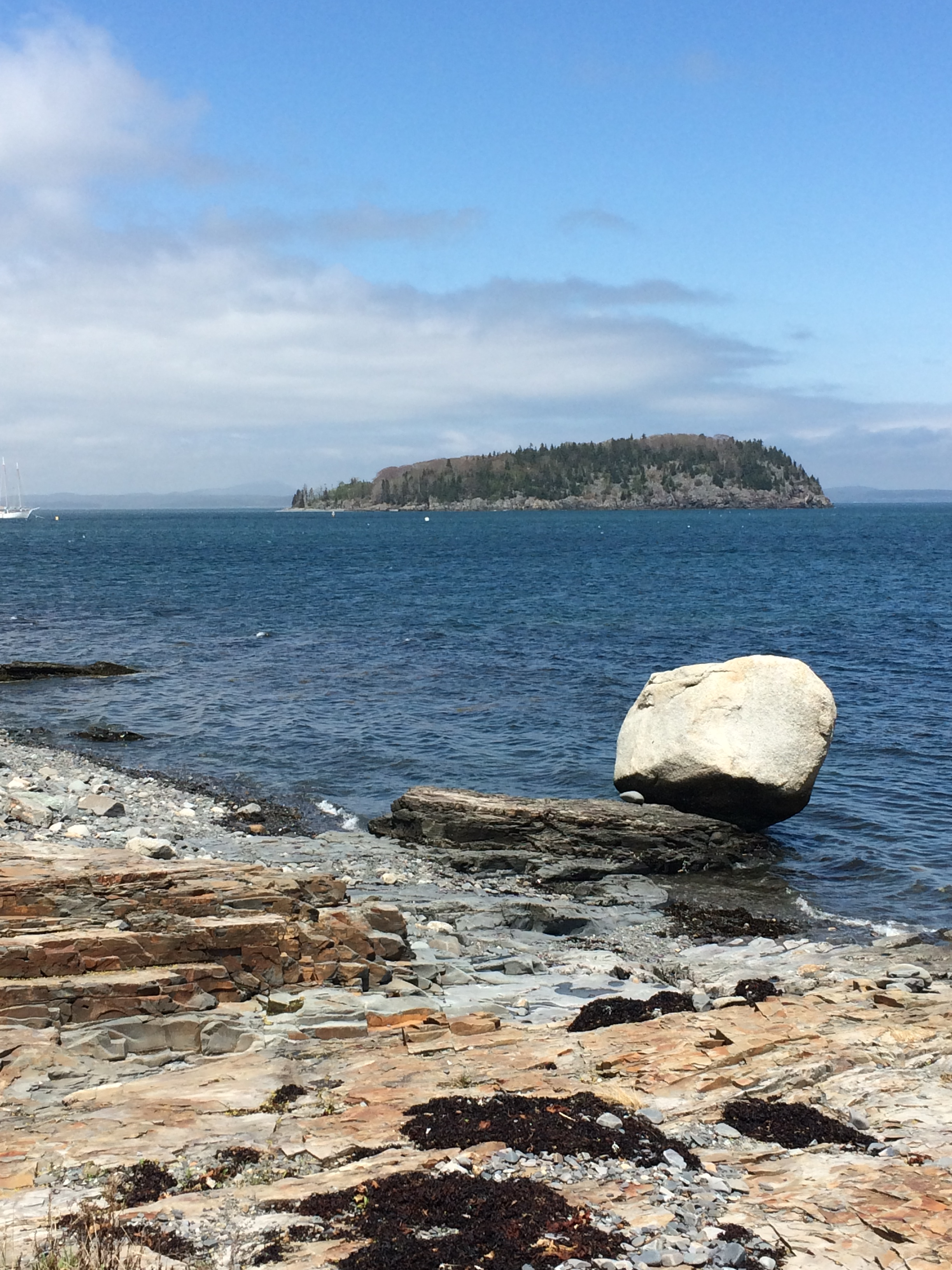
Balance Rock, for which the inn is named

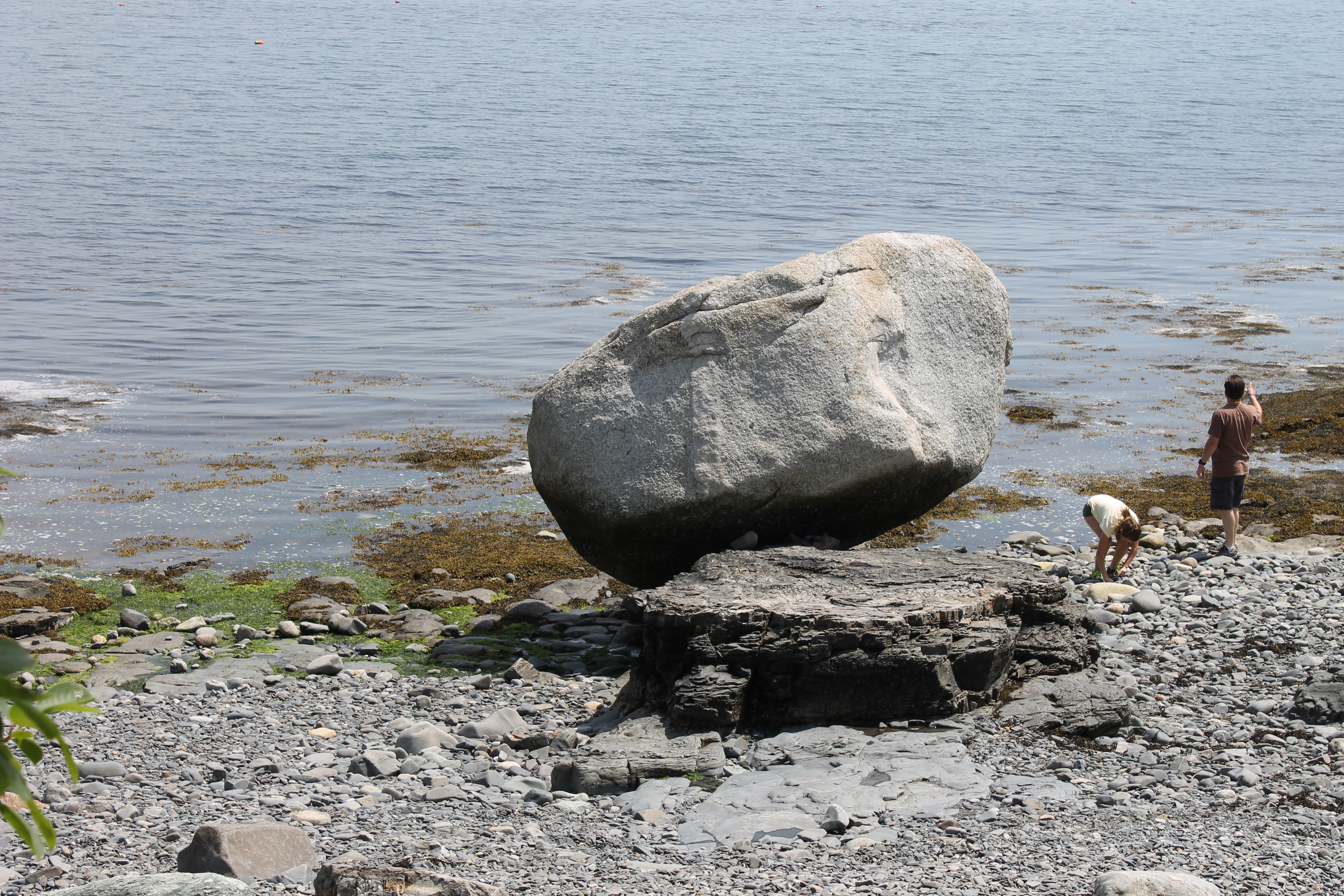
Balance Rock
