= Bar Harbor Inn =

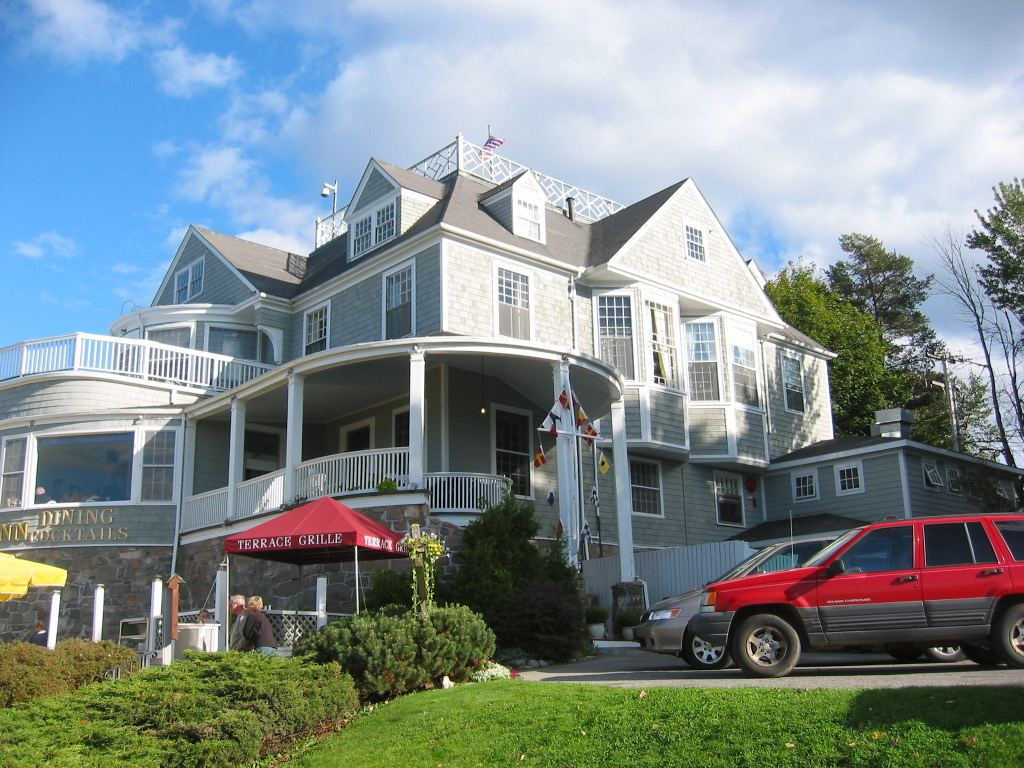
- The north-western corner of the inn, pictured in 2006
- Interactive map of the Bar Harbor Inn area
- Former names: Mount Desert Reading Room; Hotel Bar Harbor

General information
- Location: Bar Harbor, Maine, 1 Newport Drive; Bar Harbor, Maine 04609
- Coordinates: 44.390449°N 68.202494°W
- Opening: August 3, 1887 (138 years ago)
- Owner: Witham Family Hotels

Technical details
- Floor count: 3

Other information
- Number of rooms: 153

Website
- www.barharborinn.com

The Bar Harbor Inn is an inn in Bar Harbor, Maine. It was built in 1887, and has been an inn since 1950.

The inn has accommodations in the main building, Oceanfront Lodge and The Newport. It has two restaurants: the Reading Room and (in the high season only) the Terrace Grille. A bar, called the Oasis Lounge, is located off of the Reading Room. There is also a spa on site.

The inn closes from December to late March.

== History ==
The property was originally known as the Mount Desert Reading Room when it was built by the men-only, 1874-founded Oasis Club in 1887 to be its new clubhouse. The purpose of the club was to promote literary and social culture. It was designed by William Ralph Emerson.

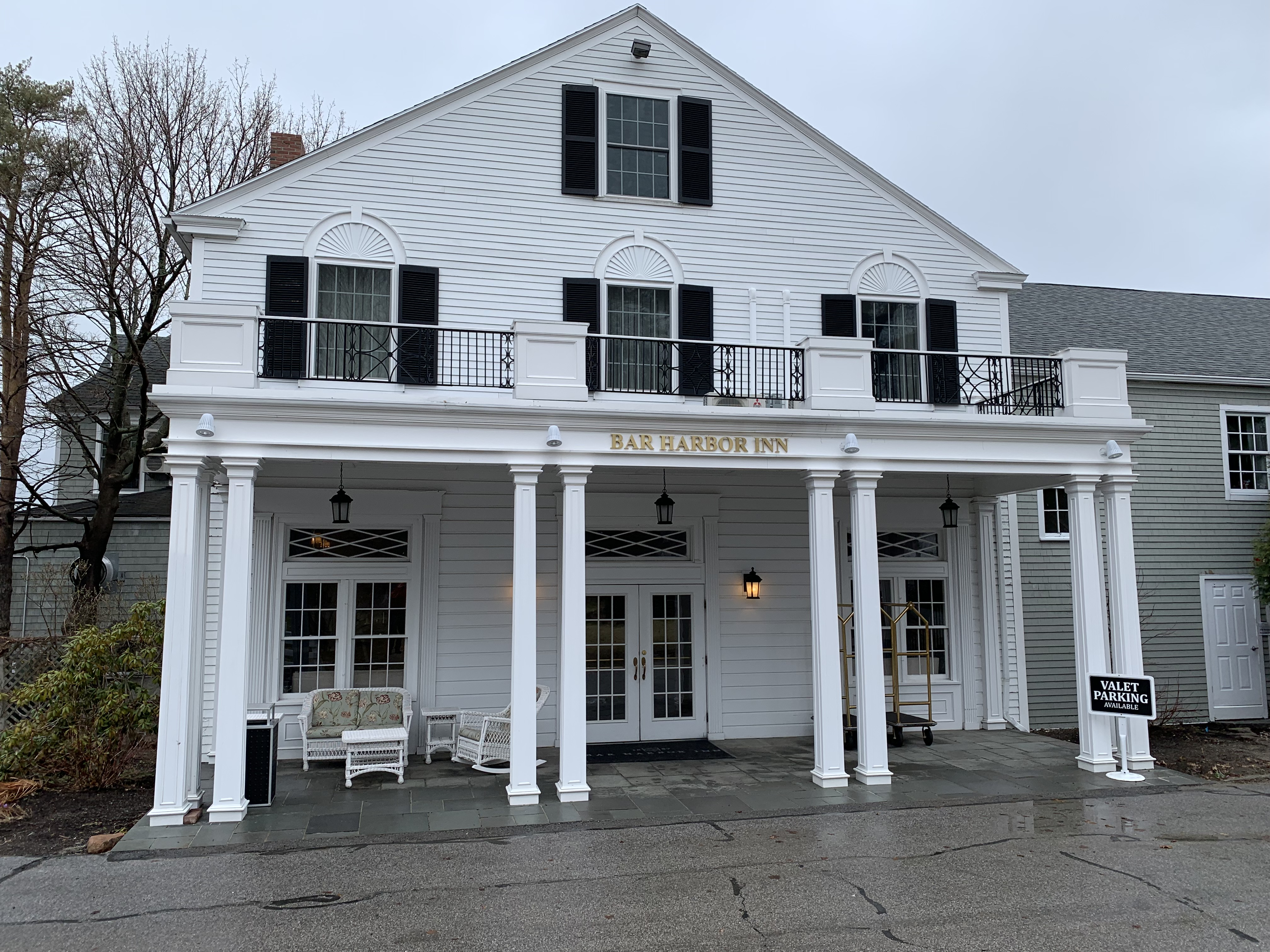
The main entrance to the inn is on the southern side of the building. This view is from spring 2019

In 1902, a steel pier was constructed at the Shore Path in front of the Reading Room to accommodate visitors that wanted to come in from Frenchman Bay.

President William Howard Taft was provided a grand reception at the Reading Room in 1910.

Ladies were permitted into the club for the time in 1921. A restaurant was opened to the public.

In 1922, due to the outbreak of World War I and a resultant decline in membership, the Reading Room was sold to Maine Central Railroad Company. It leased the building to the Bar Harbor Yacht Club. Over the ensuing quarter-century, the building had a number of proprietors.

In 1933, a group of hotel owners formed the Shore Club, which allowed guests at local hotels to use the Reading Room's facilities.

During World War II, the United States Navy leased the building for use as an observation headquarters.

When Bar Harbor was inflicted by the great fires of 1947, the American Red Cross used the building to provide shelter to many who had lost their homes.

The following year, a committee set out to raise funds, by way of a stock program, to build a new hotel. The committee was headquartered at 6 Mount Desert Street, and by September 8, 1948, they had raised $231,600. They extended the campaign "in an effort to sell the entire authorized $300,000 stock issue."

Work on the new hotel — named the Hotel Bar Harbor — began in 1950. The work incorporated the Reading Room but also included the addition of a 40-room wing.

In 1960, a 20-room motel overlooking Frenchman Bay was added to the hotel.

David J. Witham purchased the hotel in 1987 and changed the name to the current Bar Harbor Inn. The following year, he oversaw the addition of the 64-room Oceanfront Lodge to the property. The 20-room motel was relocated to make way for the new construction, but it was torn down in 1992 and replaced with the two-story Newport Building, adding 38 more rooms to the property. The hotel is still owned by his Witham Family Hotels Group, which owns two other hotels in downtown Bar Harbor: the Villager Motel and the Bar Harbor Grand.

In 2006, the Bar Harbor Inn Spa building was erected.

The inn underwent renovations during the winter and spring of 2018 and 2019, including a new infinity-edge swimming pool and a continental-breakfast building.

=== Gazebo ===
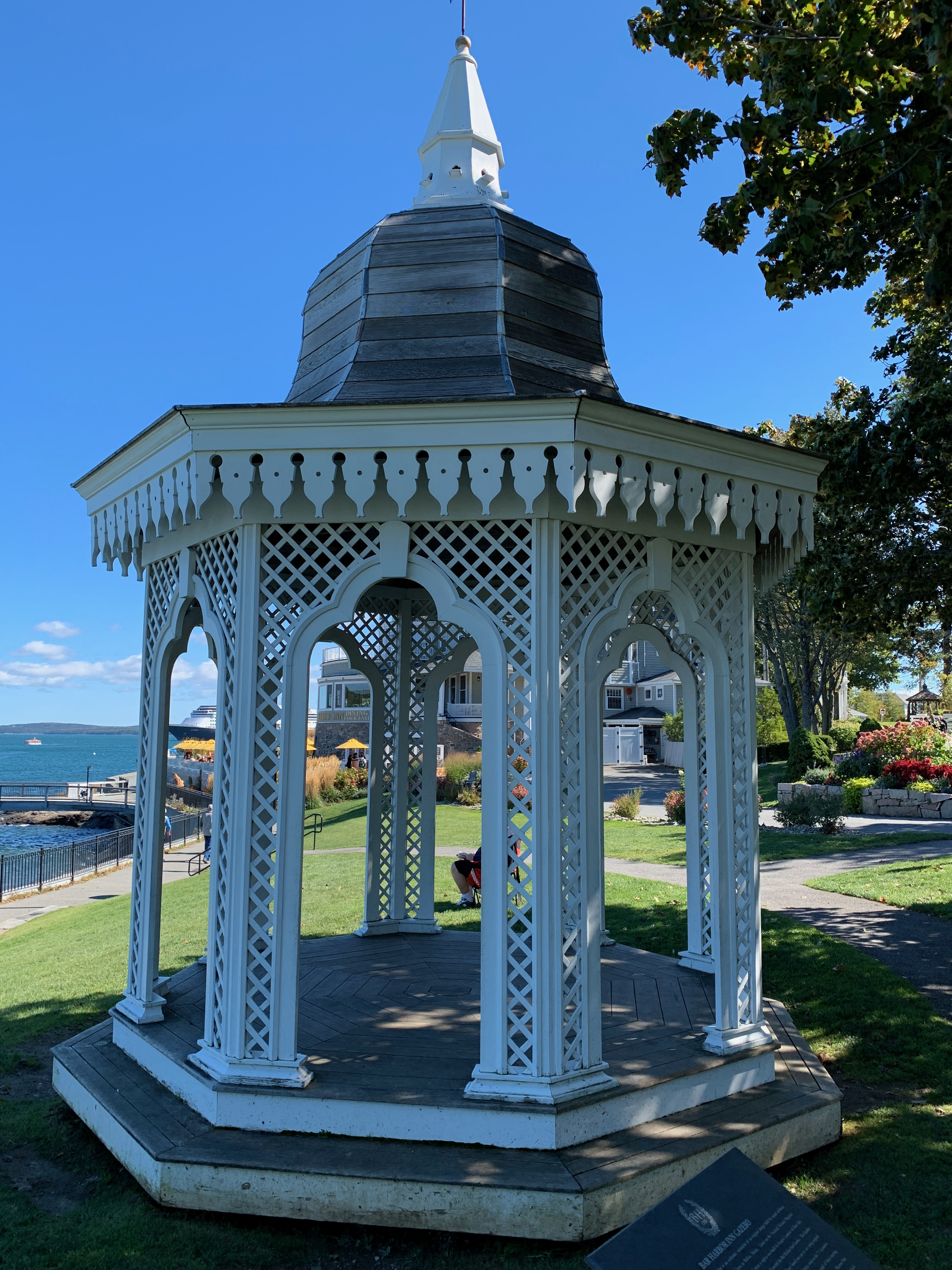
The inn's gazebo, pictured in 2019

To the west of the inn, on the slope leading up to Agamont Park, stands a gazebo. It is an authentic recreation of an original design built by Calvin Ryder in 1840 on the "White House" lawn in Belfast, Maine. That construction was listed on the National Historic Register, and was the only one of its kind until 1985, when a replica was built by Francis Cormier of Deer Isle, Maine. In May 1991, Cormier built and erected the Bar Harbor Inn gazebo. Its boards are made from Douglas fir; its floor is made from western red cedar; it contains 100 pounds of lead in its corners; brass pins to fasten the lead; stainless steel nails; vertical grain Douglas fir for the roof and gold leaf for the top. Its roof contains eight condos for the local birds. Each unit was designed with a slight tilt in the floor so that rain water will run out the hole under the bird-house stoop.

== Gallery ==
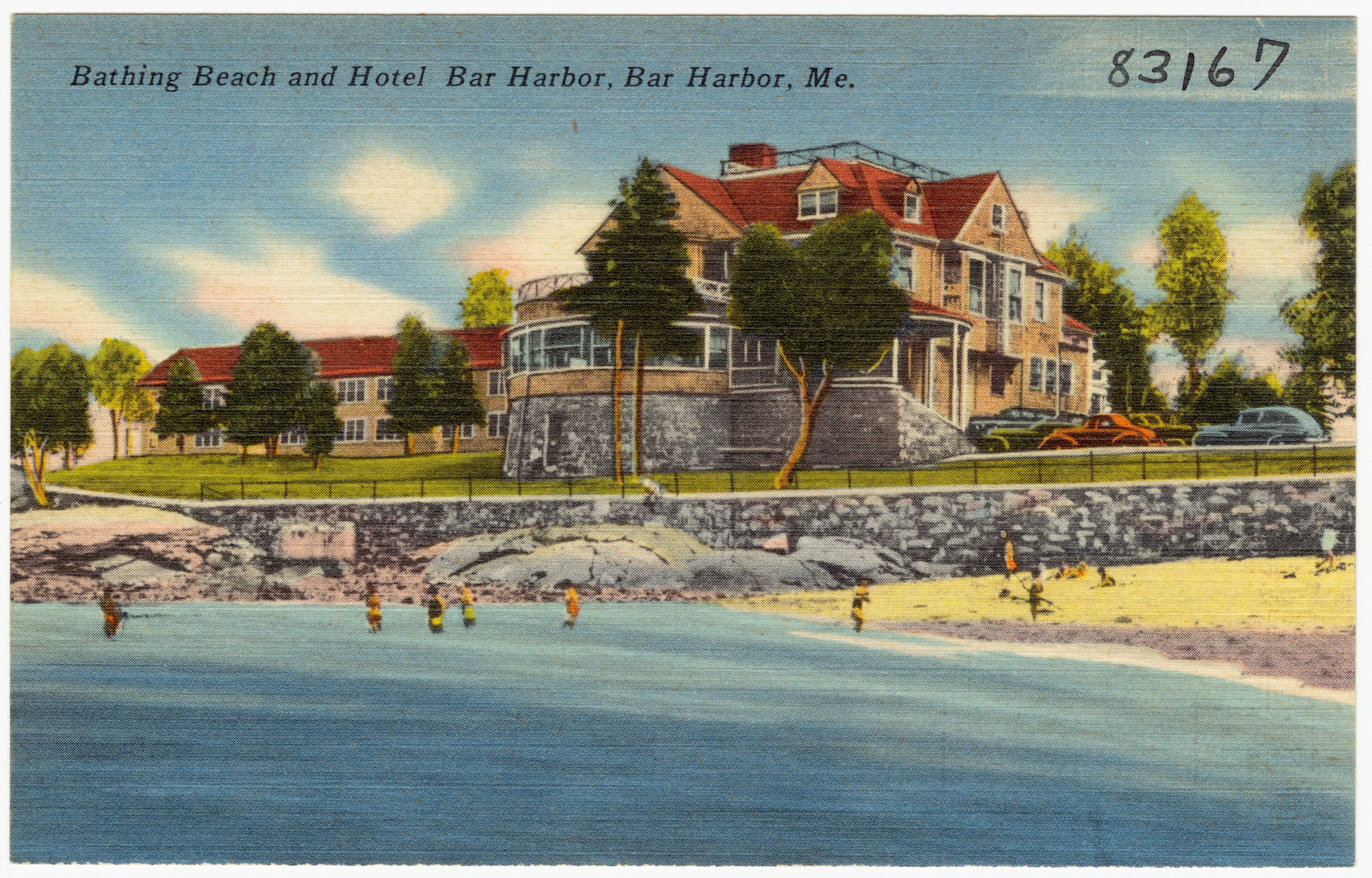
The Hotel Bar Harbor, circa 1940

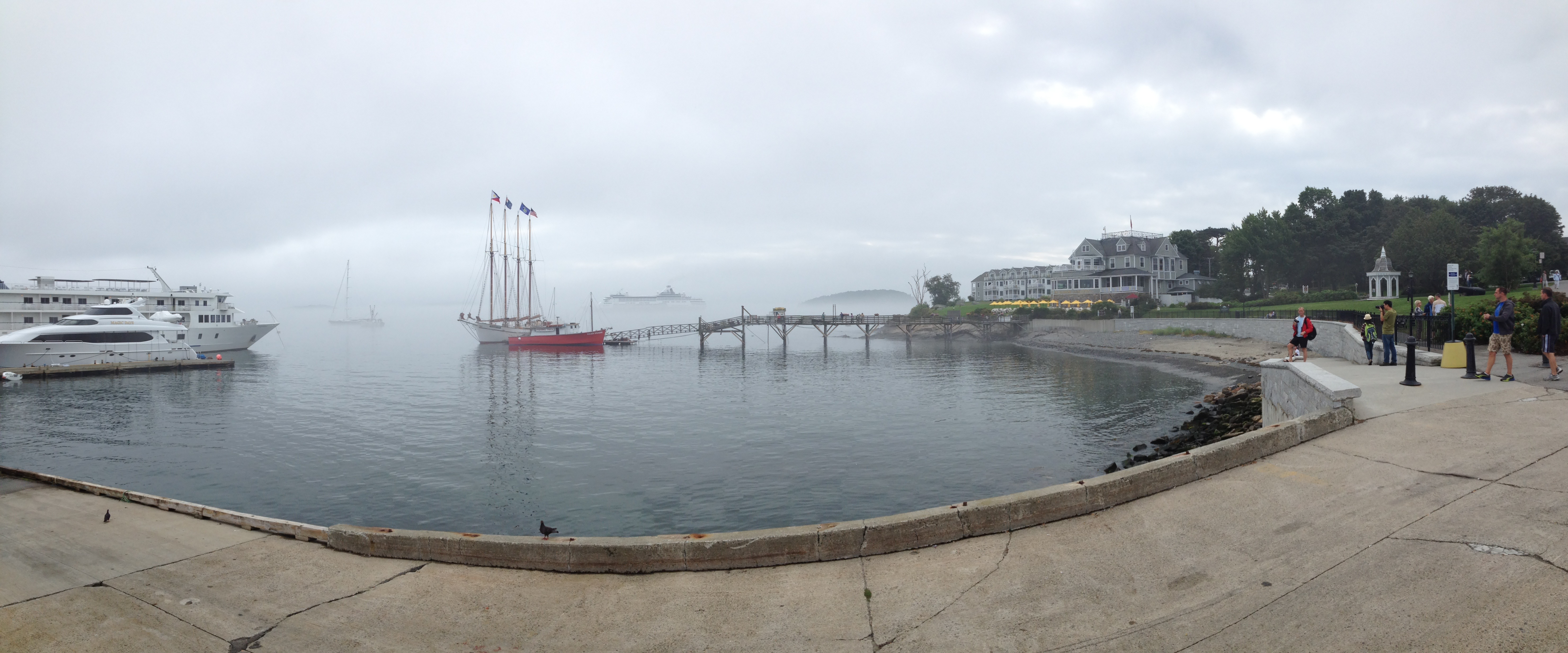
The inn viewed from Agamont Park in 2013. Also in view, the four-masted schooner Margaret Todd and Bald Porcupine Island beyond the pier

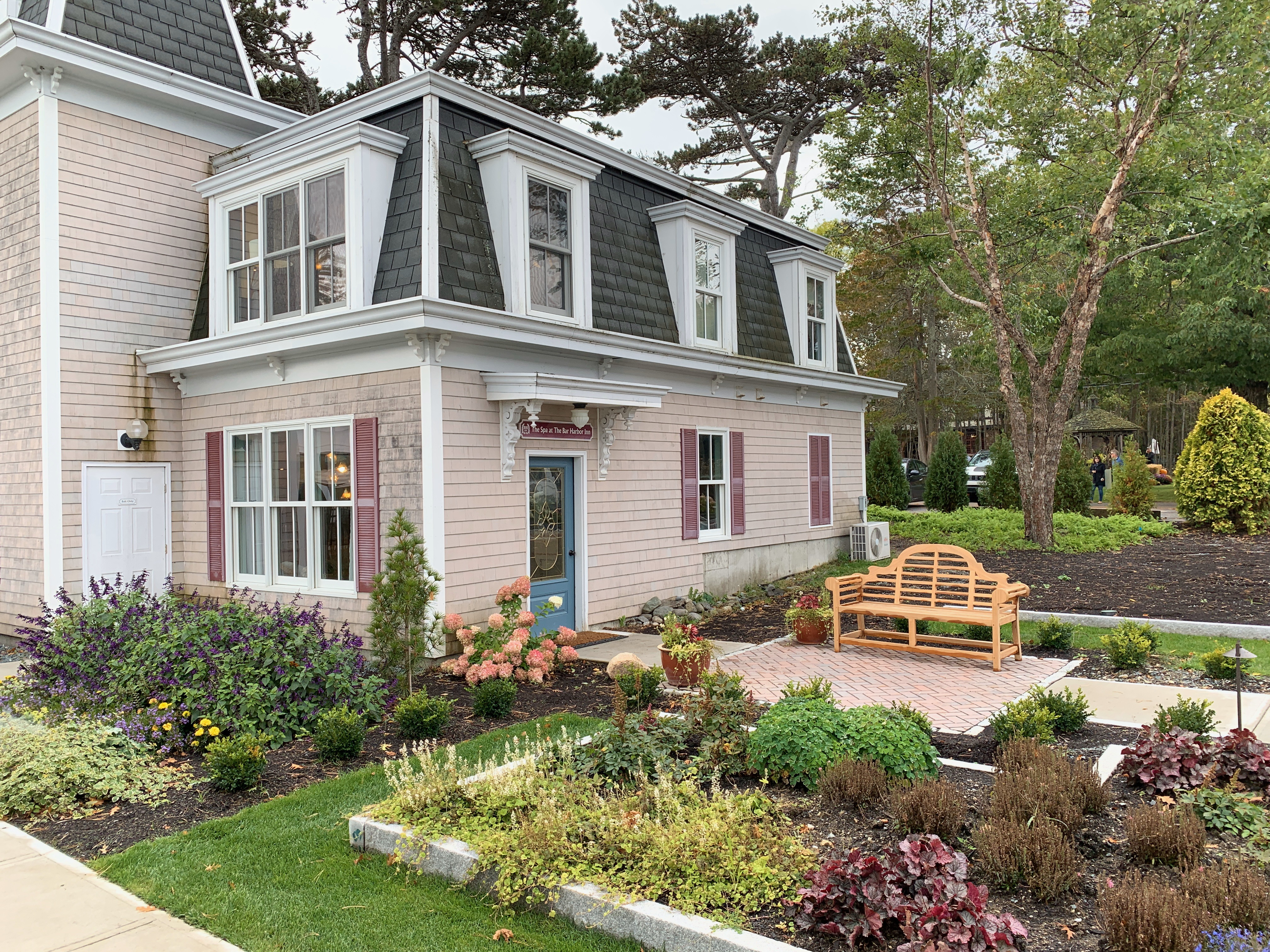
The Spa at The Bar Harbor Inn, pictured in 2019

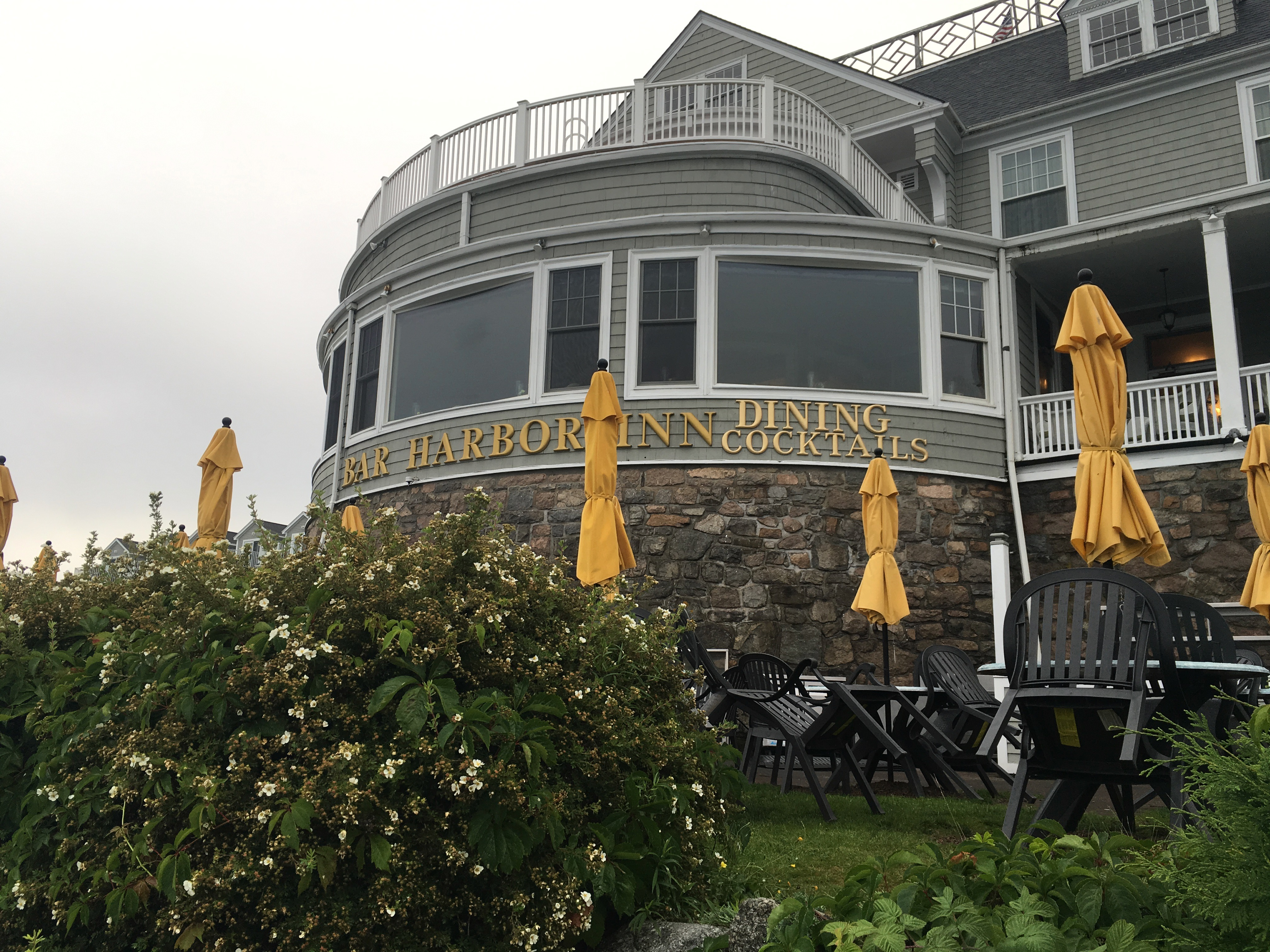
The original Reading Room section of the inn, pictured in 2016

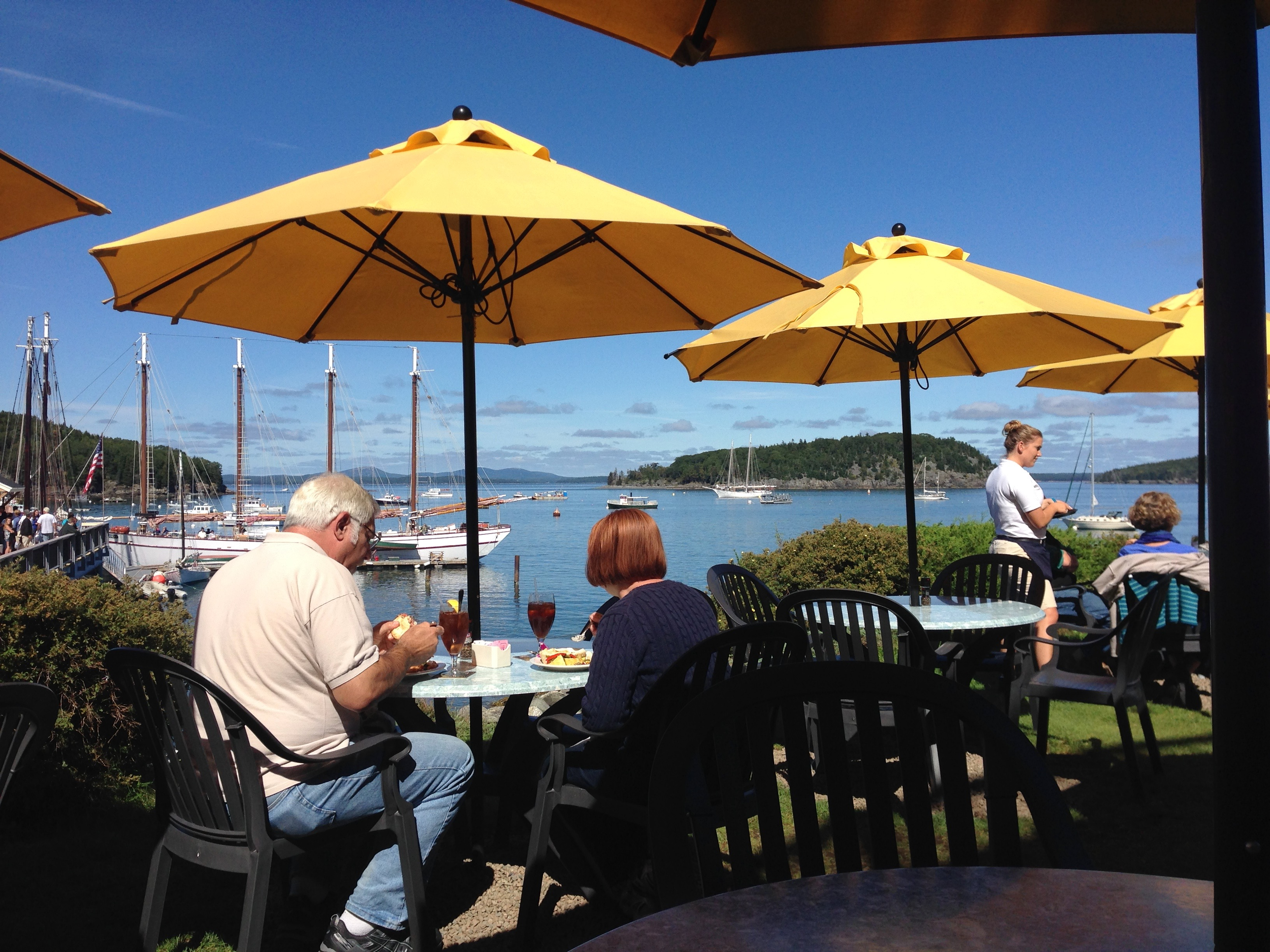
The Terrace Grille in 2015, looking northeast into Frenchman Bay between Bar Island and Sheep Porcupine Island

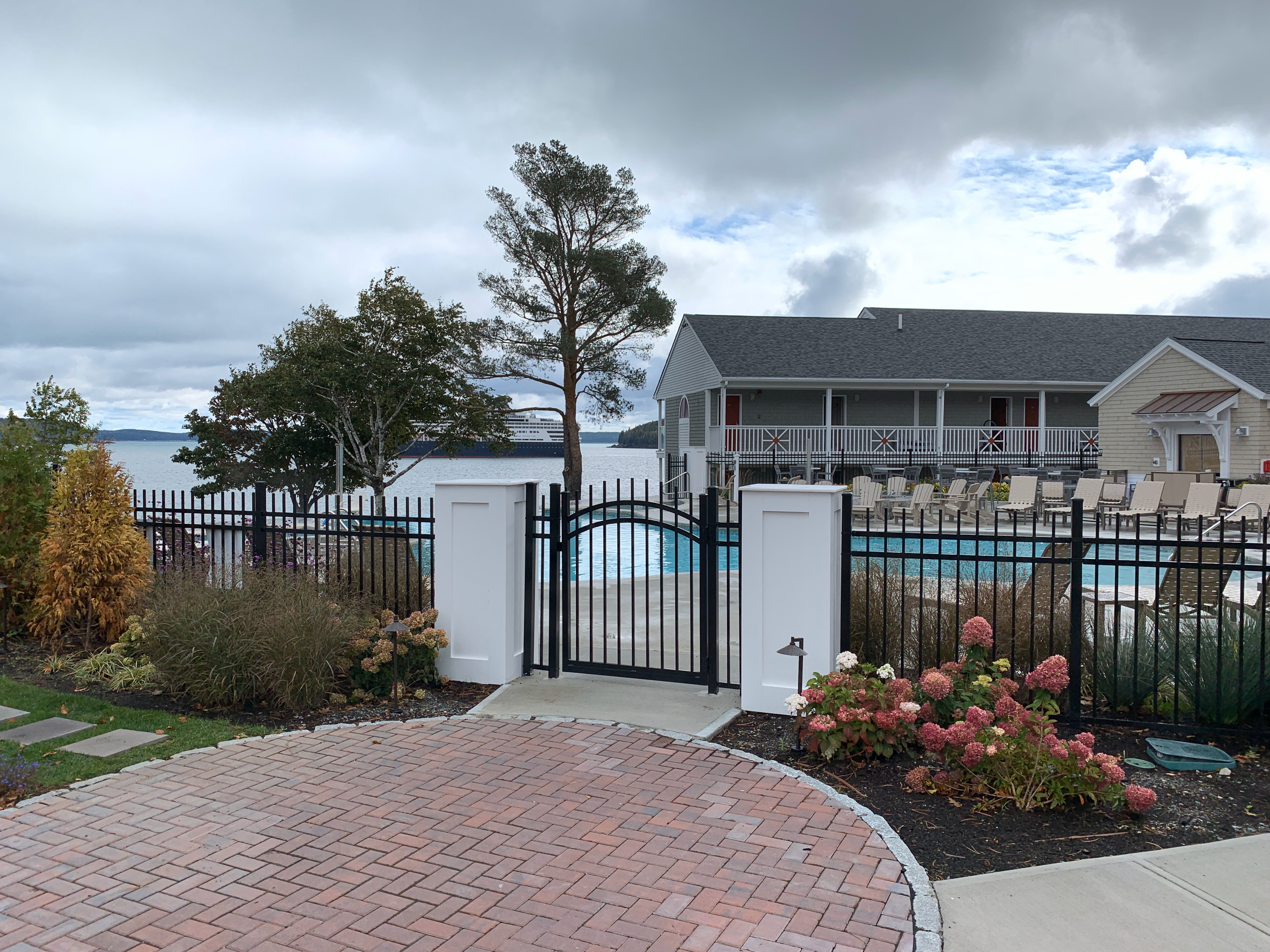
The inn's swimming pool was opened in 2019
