= Grant Park Shopping Centre =

Shopping center in Winnipeg, Manitoba

- Location: 1120 Grant Avenue; Winnipeg, Manitoba; R3M 2A6
- Coordinates: 49.8578°N 97.1656°W
- Opened: 1969; 57 years ago
- Previous names: Grant Park Plaza
- Manager: Primaris REIT
- Owner: Primaris REIT
- Num. of stores: 70
- Num. of anchor tenants: 6
- Floor area: 400,000 sq ft (37,000 m^{2})
- Public transit: Winnipeg Transit; FX3 28
- Website: grantparkshoppingcentre.com
- Building details

General information
- Completed: 1962
- Renovated: 2011

Technical details
- Floor count: 2
- Grounds: 32 acres

Design and construction
- Developer: Aronovitch & Leipsic

Grant Park Shopping Centre (formerly Grant Park Plaza) is a 70-shop, nearly 400,000-square-foot shopping centre in the Grant Park area of southwest Winnipeg, Manitoba, Canada.

Located near the mall are Grant Park High School and the Pan-Am Pool.

== Development ==
The land around what would later become Grant Park Shopping Centre was first developed with the introduction of the Harte Subdivision for the Grand Trunk Pacific Railway in 1908.

From the 1920s to late 1950s, the Grant Park area was the location of a Métis community known as Rooster Town. The difficulty of procuring affordable housing close to other members of the Métis community led families to build their own housing on this land. Throughout the 1950s, residents were under increasing pressure from developers to relocate. In 1959, the remaining residents were evicted and their homes were burnt or torn down. Rooster Town has been described by Lawrie Barkwell, senior historian at the Louis Riel Institute, as a "working-class community with a vibrant culture." Recent scholarship, such as the book Rooster Town: The History of an Urban Métis Community, 1901-1961 by Evelyn Peters, Matthew Stock and Adrian Werner and an article by David G. Burley in Urban History Review (Revue d'histoire urbaine) explore the long-hidden history of this community. The University of Manitoba also hosts an online archive about Rooster Town.

Developed by Aronovitch & Leipsic, groundbreaking to create the shopping centre took place in 1962. The centre opened with a few detached buildings in 1964; some of the original stores included Safeway, Dominion, and Clarke’s. In 1966, Woolco was added to the mall, precipitating a court case with Clarke’s that eventually reached the Supreme Court (Clark’s-Gamble of Canada Ltd. v Grant Park Plaza Ltd. et al). With the Court ruling in favour of Woolco, efforts began to enclose the mall in order to connect stores together.

Grant Park subsequently became an enclosed shopping mall in 1969. That year, the first Cinerama theatre in Winnipeg—a 742-seat National General Corporation cinema hall called Grant Park Cinerama Theatre—opened at the centre, with its entrance being through the mall itself.

The mall completed an extensive renovation of its common areas in 1989, and changed its marketing name from Grant Park Plaza to Grant Park Shopping Centre, featuring a new logo.

The mall began a four-year renovation starting in 2012 and ending in 2016.

== Stores ==
The mall has approximately 70 stores and services. It is anchored by Red River Co-op, Manitoba Liquor Mart, Shoppers Drug Mart, Landmark Cinemas, Canadian Tire and McNally Robinson; the Liquor Mart at Grant Park is the largest in the province.

The eastern end of the mall was originally anchored by discount department store Woolco, constructed approximately two years after the mall first opened and subject of a lawsuit appealed to the Supreme Court of Canada. The Woolco store was bought out and converted to Walmart in 1994. This same location was vacated by Walmart in 2001 and replaced by Zellers. This Zellers location closed on 11 February 2013. The location was then occupied by Target from November 2013 to April 2015. Canadian Tire took over roughly 75% of the space in 2016 and remainder was leased to GoodLife Fitness which opened in 2016.

As part of the renewal of Grant Park Shopping Centre and after Dominion Stores left western Canada in 1984, the Safeway supermarket was moved to the Dominion Store space in 1989.

In the 1970s and 1980s a video-game and pinball arcade known as The Pirate's Den operated in the space now taken by the mid-mall washrooms. After home videogames became more popular and during the 1989 renovations of the mall, the arcade was closed.

Further renovations in the mid-1990s made for the opening of Winnipeg's largest McNally Robinson Bookseller location in order to compete with the Chapters retail chain.

The former Target location's lease was sold to Canadian Tire and they were opened on 23 June 2016.

2 new pad sites were built on the lot during 2016-2017; Cambrian Credit Union and Fionn MacCool's Pub.

=== Movie theatre ===
Opened in 1969, Grant Park Cinerama Theatre—a 742-seat National General Corporation cinema hall—was the first Cinerama theatre in Winnipeg.

The first film screened at the theatre was Krakatoa, East of Java (1968). In 1989, the theatre became a multiplex, and since then has been reorganized a few times. It eventually came under control of Empire Theatres, who, on 27 June 2013, announced that it will be selling this theatre location along with 22 others in western Canada and Ontario to Landmark Cinemas. The theatre has since remained with Landmark, under the name Landmark Cinemas 8 Grant Park.
