= International Swimming Hall of Fame =

International Swimming Hall of Fame and Museum
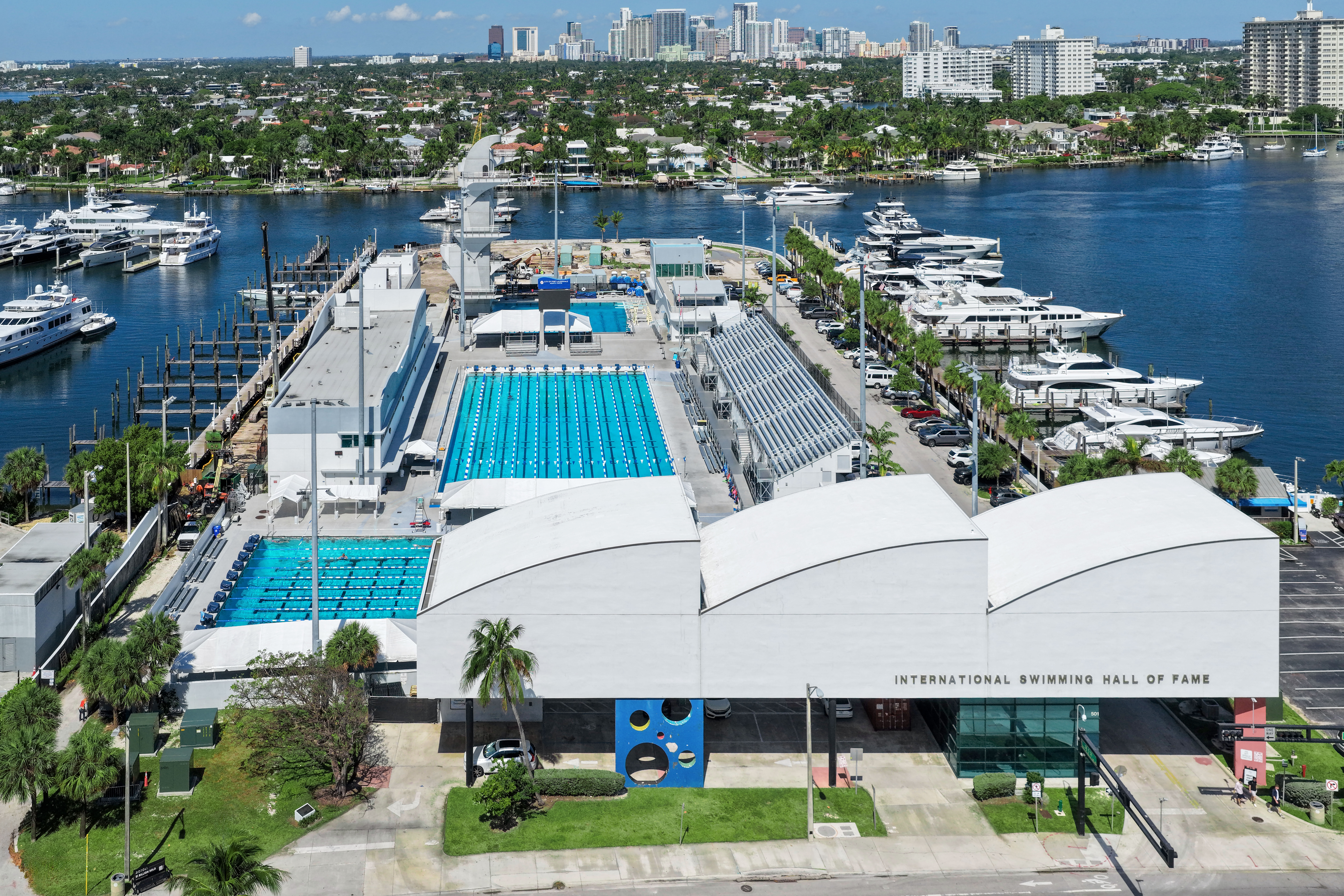
- Aerial view of the complex

- Location within Florida International Swimming Hall of Fame (the United States)
- Established: November 23, 1964
- Location: Fort Lauderdale, Florida, U.S.
- Coordinates: 26.116281°N 80.107569°W
- Type: Hall of fame
- Website: www.ishof.org

The International Swimming Hall of Fame and Museum (ISHOF) is a history museum and hall of fame, located at One Hall of Fame Drive, Fort Lauderdale, Florida, United States, operated by private interests and serving as the central point for the study of the history of swimming in the United States and world.

ISHOF exhibits include ancient art and both reproductions and original art depicting famous moments in swimming history from ancient times to modern, swimwear, civil rights, memorabilia, and artifacts belonging to persons who have promoted or excelled in aquatics. It is recognized by FINA (Fédération Internationale de Natation) as the official hall for the aquatics sports.

== History ==
=== 20th century ===
In 1965, Johnny Weissmuller became the president of the International Swimming Hall of Fame, that with this charge in 1970 was present at the Commonwealth Games in Jamaica and was introduced to Queen Elizabeth. ISHOF was incorporated in Florida as a non-profit educational corporation on November 23, 1964, with Buck Dawson, as its first executive director. Nine months later—in August 1965—a 50-meter pool, 25-yard diving well, and warm-up pool were completed. This initial part of the Swimming Hall of Fame complex was dedicated on December 27, 1965, witnessed by 4,500 swimmers and other spectators from all 50 states and eleven foreign countries.

In 1968, the then-Swimming Hall of Fame became the first world-recognized hall of fame in any sport, when the 105-nation FINA Congress met at the Summer Olympics in Mexico City and endorsed the hall of fame as an "International Swimming Hall of Fame". On June 16, 1969, the organization's Articles of Incorporation were amended to reflect that the name was changed to "International Swimming Hall of Fame". The first members of the hall of fame—a class of twenty-one—were inducted in 1965. See the full list of all honorees since 1965

=== 21st century ===
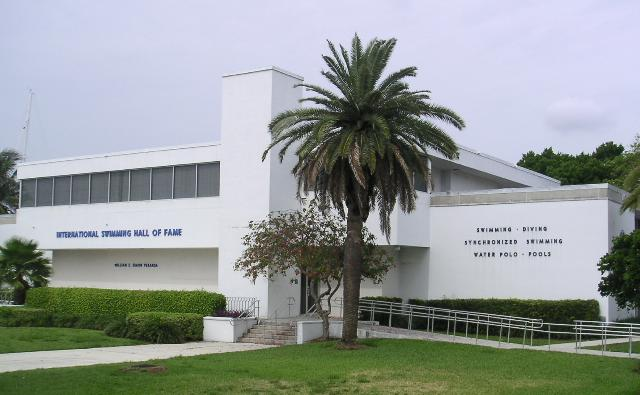
The ISHOF museum building

In 2017, the International Swimming Hall of Fame (ISHOF) merged its operations with Swimming World Magazine. The combination provided the International Swimming Hall of Fame with an outreach arm, that Swimming World can provide, to the athletes, coaches and volunteers around the world in aquatics. Brent Rutemiller will become the Chief Executive Officer overseeing the merger.

== Mission ==
The Hall of Fame's mission is to collaborate with aquatic organizations worldwide to preserve, educate and celebrate the history of aquatic sports while promoting Every Child A Swimmer (Tackling the national epidemic of childhood drowning head on, the International Swimming Hall of Fame is a driving force behind nationwide legislation to require swim lessons for all children before they are admitted into kindergarten).

== Vision ==
To be the global focal point for sharing cultures, showcasing events, increasing participation in aquatic sports and developing educational and lesson programs that promote swimming as an essential life-skill.

== Nominations ==
The Executive Nomination Committee, with the help of ISHOF Staff and the Executive Nomination Committee Chairman oversees the nomination process for the following 9 categories:

- Swimming
- Open Water/Marathon Swimming
- Diving
- Water Polo
- Artistic Swimming (Synchronized Swimming)
- Paralympics
- Coach
- Contributor (to aquatics)
- Pioneer

(Nominations can be submitted on the ISHOF website.)

== See also ==
- Aquatic Hall of Fame and Museum of Canada
- List of FINA Athletes of the Year
- List of Swimming World Swimmers of the Year
