= Grant Park, Bar Harbor =

Public park in Bar Harbor, Maine

Grant Park
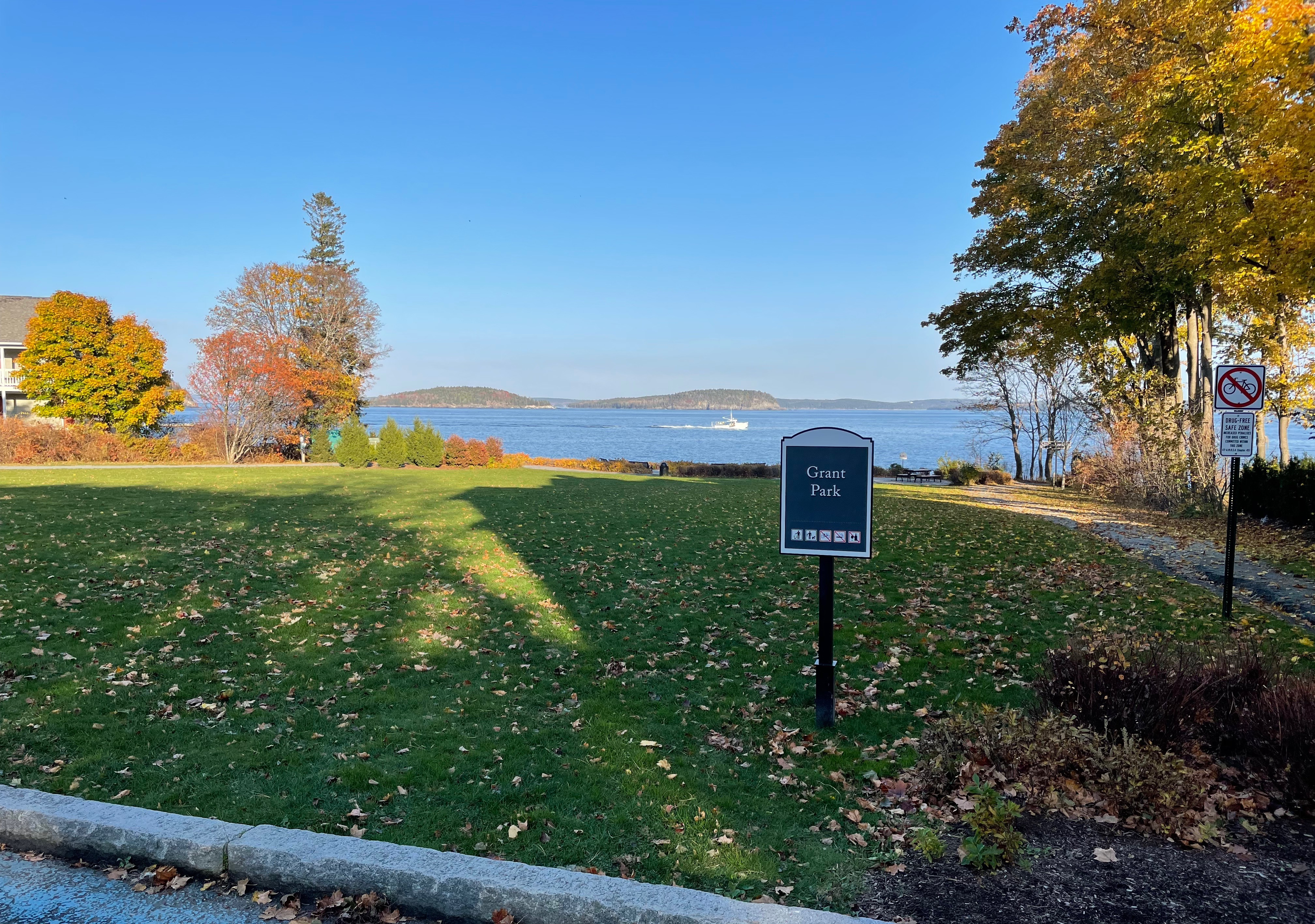
- Looking east into Frenchman Bay from the parking lot between Albert Meadow and the park, 2021
- Interactive map of Grant Park
- Type: Urban park
- Location: Bar Harbor, Maine, United States
- Coordinates: 44.38895328°N 68.200732°W
- Owner: Town of Bar Harbor
- Open: 24 hours

Grant Park is an oceanside urban park in Bar Harbor, Maine, United States. It is located about halfway along the town's mile-long Shore Path, overlooking Frenchman Bay. Balance Rock, deposited during an ice age, is located on the shore beside the path.

The park is named for Harry Allen Grant Jr. (1836–1898), who built the second summer cottage in Bar Harbor in 1869 (after Alpheus Hardy's cottage the previous year). Grant was an attorney from Tarrytown, New York. He paid $400 for the lot, and had constructed a tennis court. It occupied the grassed area between today's parking lot and the Shore Path. In 1912, fourteen years after Grant's death, his widow, Julia Schoonmaker Grant, sold the property to a syndicate of local men who subsequently sold it to the Town of Bar Harbor. The Bar Harbor Village Improvement Association took the park into its care, and had Grant's house moved to another part of town.

The park was renovated in 2017, with the addition of a paved area with benches.
