= Aquatic Hall of Fame and Museum of Canada =

Sports museum in Manitoba, Canada

Canadian Aquatic Hall of Fame
- Arms of the Aquatic Hall of Fame and Museum of Canada

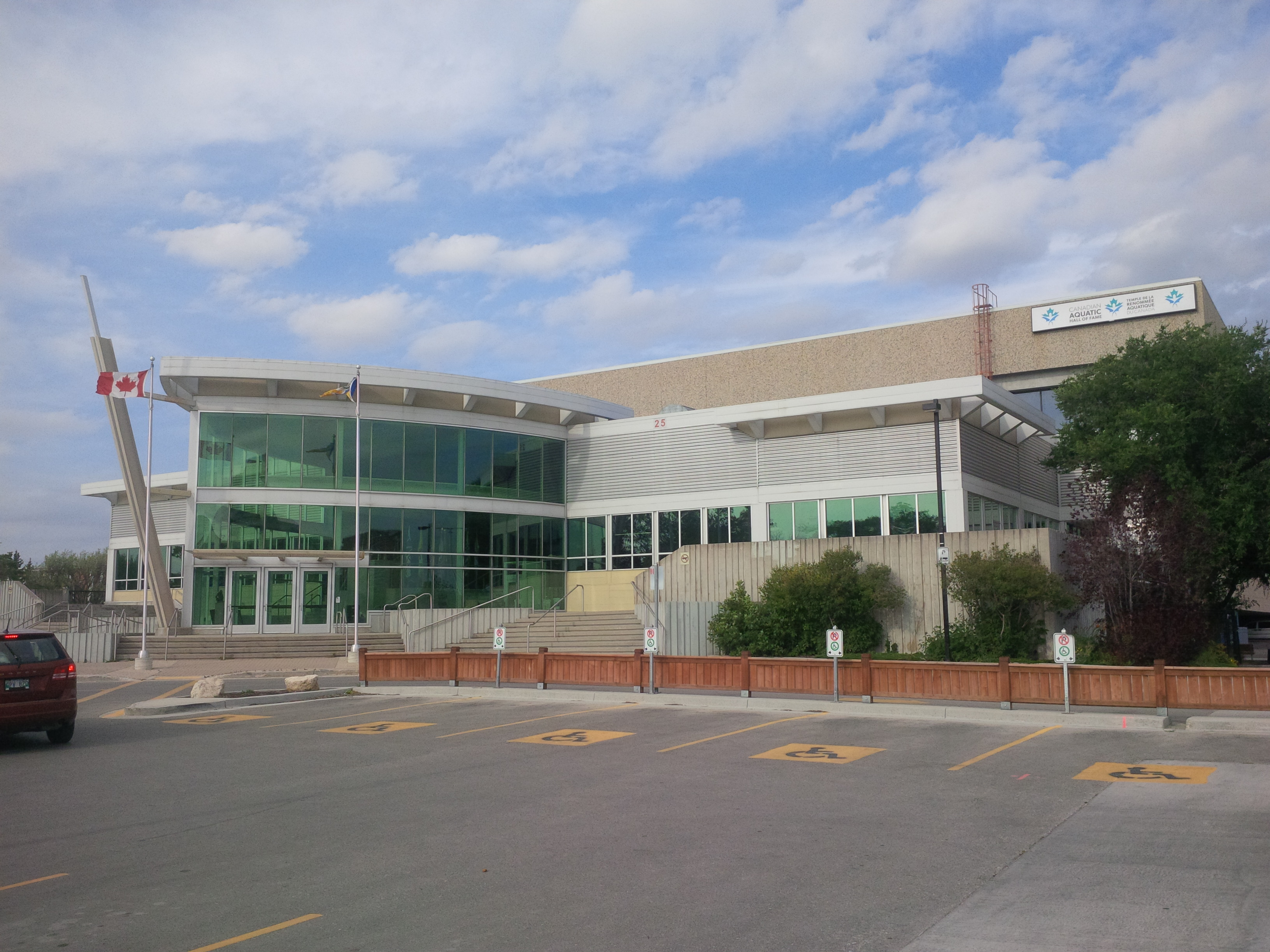
- Exterior of Aquatic Hall of Fame and Museum
- Former name: Aquatic Hall of Fame and Museum of Canada
- Established: December 14, 1970
- Location: 25 Poseidon Bay, Pan Am Pool, Winnipeg, MB, Canada.
- Type: Sports museum
- Collection size: 3.000 aquatic artifacts
- Founder: Vaughan L. Baird
- Website: aquatichalloffame.ca

The Canadian Aquatic Hall of Fame (formerly the Aquatic Hall of Fame and Museum of Canada, AHFMC) is a museum dedicated to water sports in Canada—namely swimming, diving, synchronized swimming, and water polo—and is located at the Pan Am Pool in Winnipeg, Manitoba.

As the oldest incorporated sports museum in Canada, it is home to the National Archives for Aquatic Sports and has an extensive collection of swimming, diving, synchronized swimming and water polo memorabilia and art. It recognizes athletes and coaches who have competed in the Olympic Games, Commonwealth Games, Pan-American Games, and World championships as well as important supporters.

The Museum is affiliated with the Canadian Museums Association, Canadian Heritage Information Network, and Virtual Museum of Canada, as well as being a member of the International Sports Heritage Association.

== History ==
In the 1960s, the Pan-Am Pool was built for the 1967 Pan-Am Games, which was to take place in Winnipeg as the first Pan-Am Games held in Canada. In March that year, Winnipeg Mayor Stephen Juba applied to the Canadian Amateur Swimming Association for the Aquatic Hall of Fame and Museum of Canada to be housed at the Pool. (Negotiations for the application were done by Vaughan Lawson Baird on behalf of the City.)

The application was soon accepted, and it was also announced that the AHFMC would be the home of the National Archives for Aquatic Sports (swimming, diving, synchronized swimming, and water polo). Three years later, on 14 December 1970, the Aquatic Hall of Fame and Museum of Canada Inc. received letters patent, thereby becoming the oldest incorporated Hall of Fame in Canada. The original directors of AHFMC were Juba and Baird, along with Albert Frederic Ford, and Guy Simonis.

In May 1991, the 7th Diving World Cup was held at the Pan-Am Pool, becoming the first World Cup of the aquatics to be held in Canada.

On 15 June 1997, the AHFMC received a Coat of Arms from the Canadian Heraldic Authority, the first Hall of Fame in Canada to receive such.

In 1999, a new 10,000-sqft addition, called the Royal Gallery, was added for the Aquatic Hall of Fame and Museum of Canada. In the summer that year, Winnipeg held the 13th Pan-Am Games, where the Royal Gallery was dedicated by Princess Anne on July 26 at the inaugural event of diving.

In 2006, AHFMC was closed as result of a dispute with the city, and the collection was placed in storage. In March 2014, the City of Winnipeg and the AHFMC reached an amicable resolution regarding the use of the facilities and for AHFMC to return to Pan-Am Pool. The Museum was finally reopened in 2015.

In 2017, AHFMC moved back to the Royal Gallery, and was renamed the Canadian Aquatic Hall of Fame.

== See also ==
- International Swimming Hall of Fame
