= Pan Am Pool =

Swimming facility in Winnipeg, Manitoba

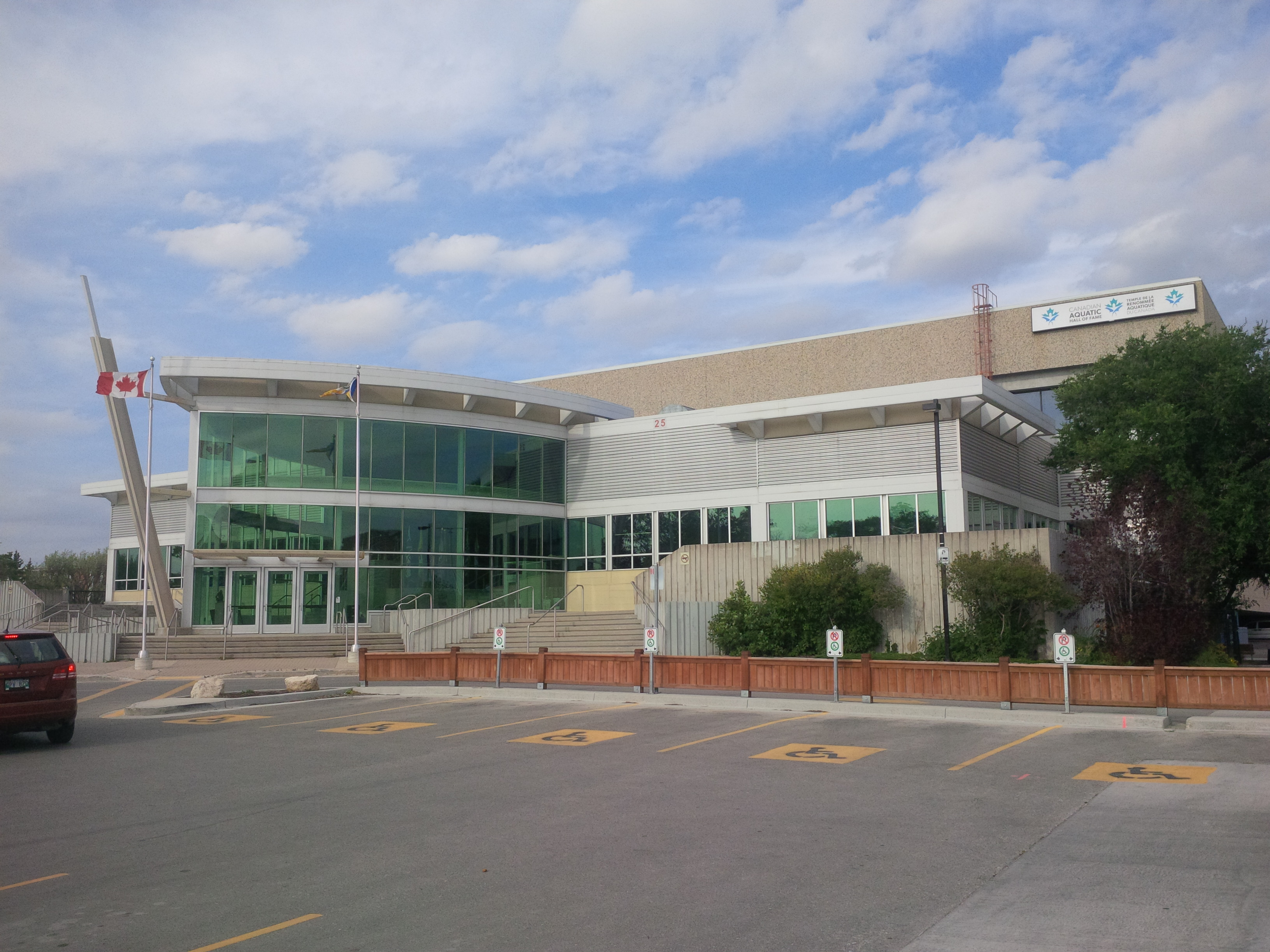
- Interactive map of Pan Am Pool
- Address: Winnipeg, Manitoba, Canada
- Coordinates: 49°51′19″N 97°10′23″W
- Owner: City of Winnipeg
- Capacity: 2,300

Construction
- Built: 1967
- Opened: July 1, 1967; 59 years ago
- Architect: Smith Carter Searle

Website
- Official website

The Pan Am Pool is an indoor swimming facility in Winnipeg, Manitoba, Canada built for the 1967 Pan American Games. It is located in southwest Winnipeg and consists of three pools: two are used for competitive swimming and one is a children's "kiddie pool".

== Overview ==
=== Architecture ===
The Pan Am's commissioners were motivated by an ambitious social policy of providing recreational opportunities to a wide population. As such, The Pan Am Pool features many characteristics of Brutalist architecture: the exterior of the centre presents four enormous bare concrete walls suspended above a vertically-patterned concrete main level, while the interior also made extensive use of béton brut in a "typically Brutalist manner". Another example is the heavy mullions of the narrow clerestory windows. At the time of its completion, the pool facility placed among the top five in the world and featured the only 10-metre (33 ft) diving tower in Canada. The tower includes platforms at three, five, seven and a half, and ten metres.

=== Tanks ===
The main tank is 23 metres wide (25 yd). For swimming competitions, the pool can be configured as either a long course of 50 metres (164 ft) or a short course of 25 metres (82 ft) using a movable bulkhead. This allows the pool to be divided into sections for competitive swimming and family swimming. The bulkhead can also be positioned to create 15-metre (49-ft) competition lanes or a 30-metre (98-ft) length for water polo.

The dive tank is part of the main pool and has a depth of 4.9 metres (16 ft). It includes two one-metre (3.3-ft) springboards, two three-metre (9.8-ft) springboards, and platforms at 3, 5, 7.5 and 10 metres (9.8, 16, 24.6 and 32.8 ft). A 3-metre (9.8-ft) climbing rope is located near the diving towers.

=== Fitness area ===
The facility has a track and two weight rooms.

== History ==
=== Planning and finance ===
Planning for Pan Am Pool started when the City of Winnipeg became host city for the 1967 Pan Am Games. In March 1963, the Mayors and Reeves Association of Greater Winnipeg met to ask Metro Winnipeg to contribute funds for a high-quality swimming pool. Originally there were to be two outdoor types, one located in the Assiniboine Park area, the other in the Kildonan Park area. However, Metro Councillor Jack Willis stated at the time that if they were to apply for provincial and federal grants, a much better, indoor swimming pool could be built for the Games and used afterwards.

By January 1964, little progress had been made, and there were important details that needed to be finalized over the shape of the pool – L-shaped or parallel rectangles. Metro had budgeted CA$200,000 in their 1964 Capital Works Program. Construction would have to commence no later than the winter of 1964–65 in order to be ready for the 1967 Games.

The Pan Am Games (1967) Society decided to build a $1 million indoor enclosed Olympic-size pool in the Grant Park area, adjacent to Grant Park High School.

The land parcel, bounded by Cambridge, Grant, Nathaniel, Taylor, was owned by the Winnipeg School Division. The land exchange deal for the 8-acre (3.2 ha) site met opposition which threatened to delay the construction timetable. Winnipeg Alderman Lillian Hallonquist, at a January 1966 Finance Committee meeting, stated "the whole location is wrong" because the Grant Park site would not be easily accessible from other parts of the metro area. Alderman Grant McLeod expressed fears that Pan Am Pool would become a financial white elephant after the Games were over. The deal was approved in a vote at a January 17, 1966, City Council meeting, and 8.75 acres of city-owned property was exchanged to the Division for the 8-acre pool site. One of the potential sites studied was next to the Winnipeg Arena. The design of the Pool would be two-thirds the size of the Winnipeg Arena. Once completed, the facility would be able to accommodate over 1,000 recreational swimmers at once.

The firm of Smith Carter Searle was chosen to design the pool. Six construction tenders were submitted for the pool, the lowest of which was more than twice the original estimate for the facility. Pearson Construction Co. Ltd.'s bid pegged the cost at over $2.5 million. The city's original pitch estimated the net cost of the games at $1.3 million, but by fall 1965 this had risen to over $3 million. Among the additional costs was about $250,000 to put a roof on the pool, which was not required for the games but was desired for year-round use. Although an agreement based on the original estimate divided the cost in thirds between the federal and provincial governments and municipalities, the city expected the federal government to pay the overruns. After cost estimates were made public, the Pan Am Games (1967) Society asked Ottawa for an additional $1.5 million in funding.

With only 13 months before the beginning of the Games, there was no physical building sufficient to host the swimming events. Vaughn L. Baird, chairman of the Canadian Council of Diving, urged all those involved in the project to accelerate the process:

There is little construction time left. The government of Manitoba has agreed the government of Canada dollar for dollar to cover the Pan Am Pool. It is of the utmost urgency that the government of Canada render a decision quickly.

In the spring, it was announced that trials to select Canada's diving team would take place July 1–3 at the new pool. But an ad published in the Free Press listed the trials would take place July 1–6.

Pan Am Games Society and construction officials (Pearson?) denied that the venue would be incomplete for the games in early July, despite that the majority of the interior, electrical and mechanical work was unfinished in mid-May.

At their May 1967 meeting, the civic Parks & Recreation Committee made an appeal to Winnipeg city council for $98,000 to go towards equipment, of which $22,000 would be spent on furniture, $20,000 on lockers, $1,500 for hair dryers, and $40,000 for an asphalt parking lot. Later that month, $6,000 was allocated for display cases for the Swimming Hall of Fame.

=== Life of the facility ===
The pool was officially opened on 21 July 1967, the day before the games began. Two thousand people packed the stands for the ceremony which included federal finance minister Mitchell Sharp, Manitoba Attorney General Sterling Lyon and Winnipeg mayor Steven Juba, pouring bottles of water from the Atlantic, Pacific and Arctic oceans into the pool from the bulkhead. This was followed by synchronized swimming and diving demonstrations.

At the time of its completion, the pool facility placed among the top five in the world and featured the only 10-metre (33 ft) diving tower in Canada. Six months after the Games, Winnipeg was chosen to hold the 1968 Canadian Olympic swim trials. Montreal had vied for the competition but did not have a suitable pool to use and could not budget one due to costs of Expo 67. Halifax had been chosen for the 1968 Canadian diving trials. In the pool's first seven years of operation it had the highest attendance and revenue of any indoor pool in North America and hosted all of Canada's major aquatic competitions.

The Pan Am Pool underwent several expansions in the 1990s leading up to the 1999 Pan American Games, which it also hosted.

==== Renovations and refurbishments (2012–19) ====
In October 2012, the Pan Am Pool was partially shut down due to mechanical issues. Various upgrades were made in 2016 to prepare for the 2017 Canada Summer Games. In 2018, major renovations were announced to the ceiling, lighting and public address system, the upgrades expected to cost $2.6 million. It reopened in January 2019 after a two-year, $3.4 million refurbishment.

== Swim Clubs ==
The first swim club to announce their presence at Pan Am Pool was the Cardinal Swim Club. The Pan Am Pool is also home to the Manta Swim Club, The Manitoba Marlins and The Manitoba Masters Aquatic Club swim teams and also hosts the Vortex water polo team.

== Aquatic Hall of Fame & Museum ==
Since 1967, the pool was home to the Aquatic Hall of Fame and Museum of Canada. In 1999, a separate building was completed to house the collection in advance of the 1999 Pan American Games.

In 2006, the Hall of Fame’s 40-year agreement with the facility ended, and the organization was required to vacate the space.

The former museum space includes a 2.7-metre (9-foot) statue of Poseidon, the Greek god of the sea.

== Pan Am Clinic ==
The Pan Am Clinic, in a separate building next to the Pool, is a specialized sports injury unit, opened in 1979. It operated as a privately run clinic from its initial opening until 2001, when the Winnipeg Regional Health Authority (WRHA) assumed responsibility for it.

== Gallery ==
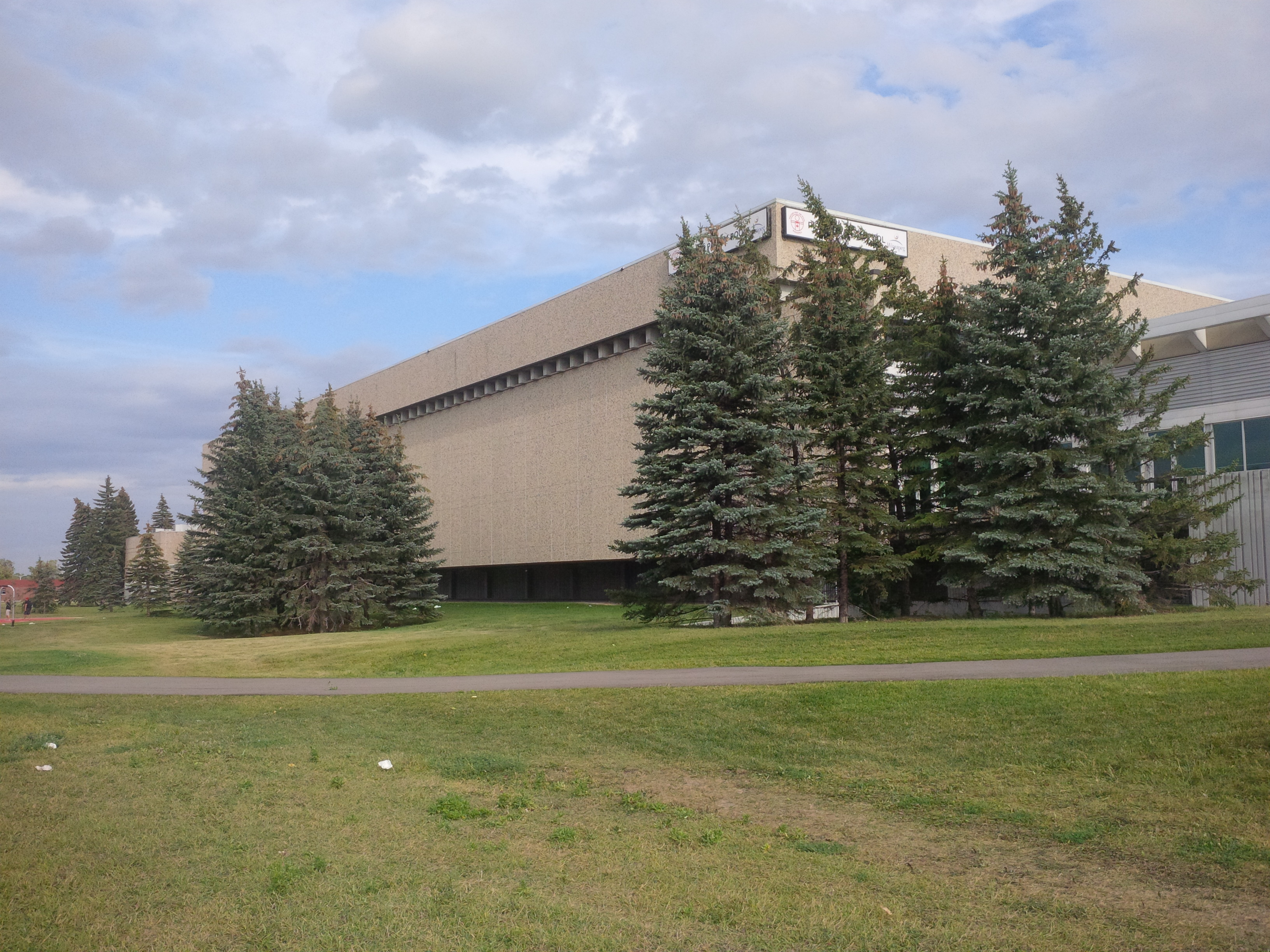
Pan Am Pool – Exterior (from Grant Ave.)

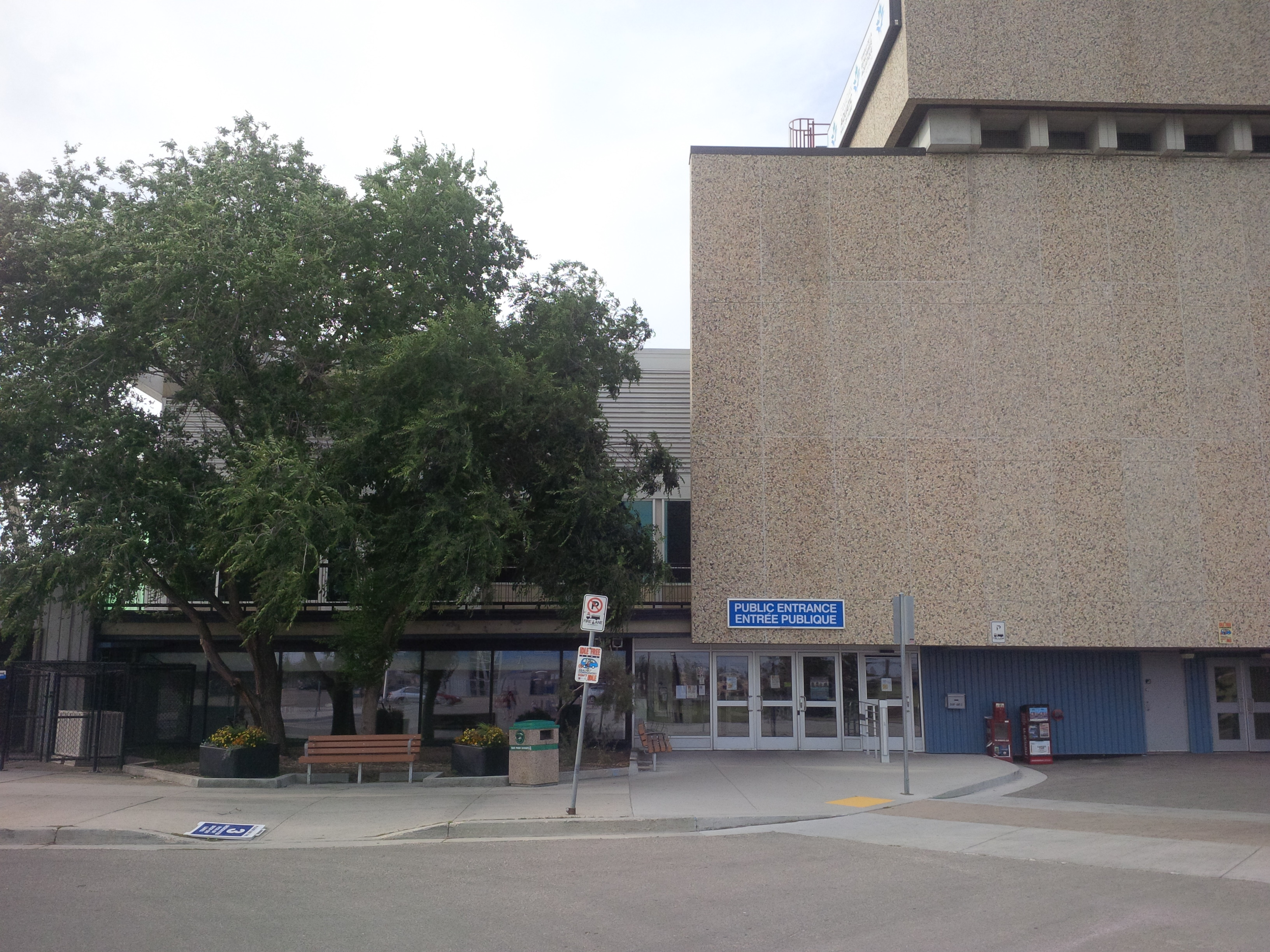
Pan Am Pool – Exterior Main entrance

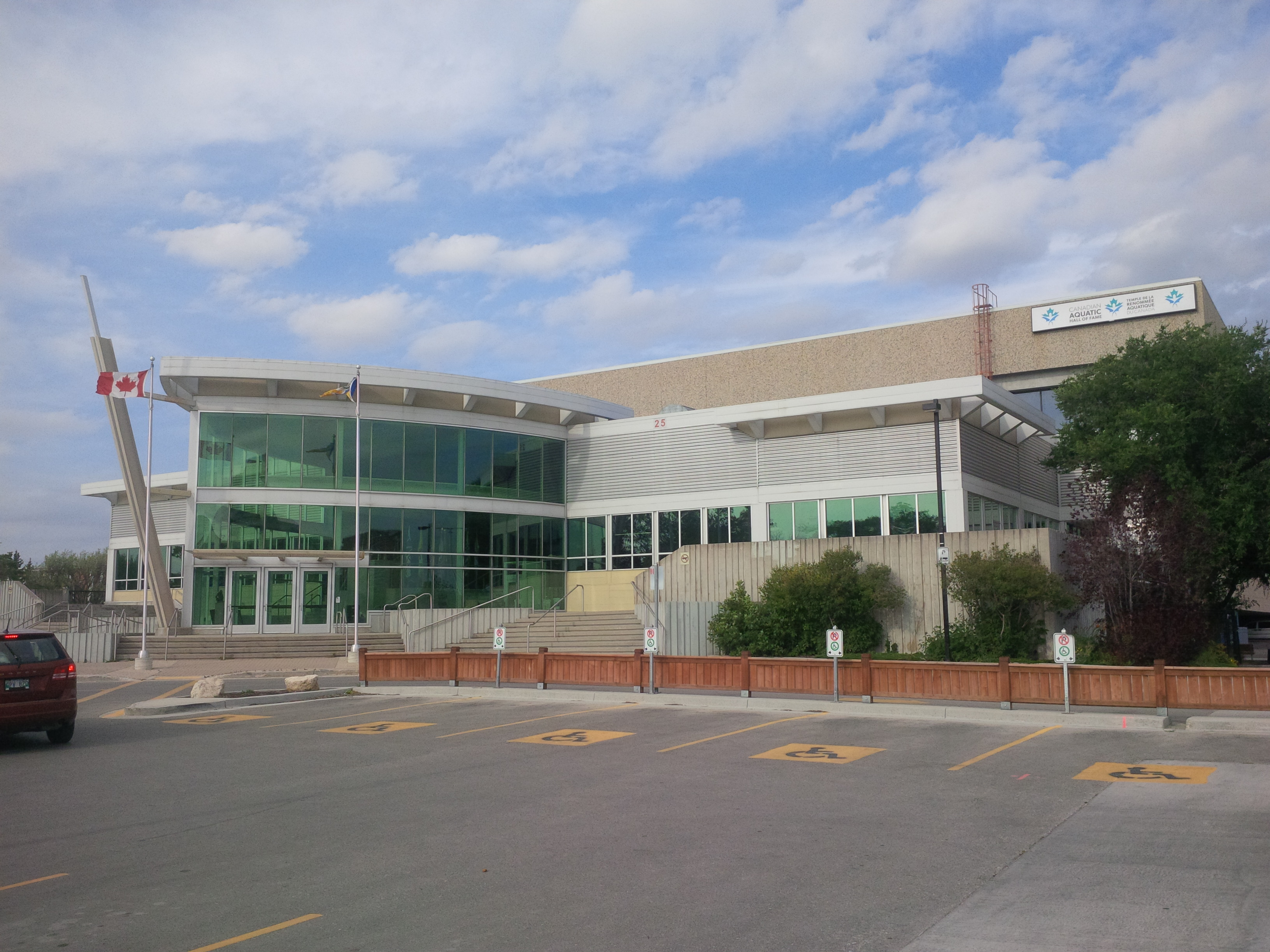
Pan Am Aquatic Hall of Fame & Museum

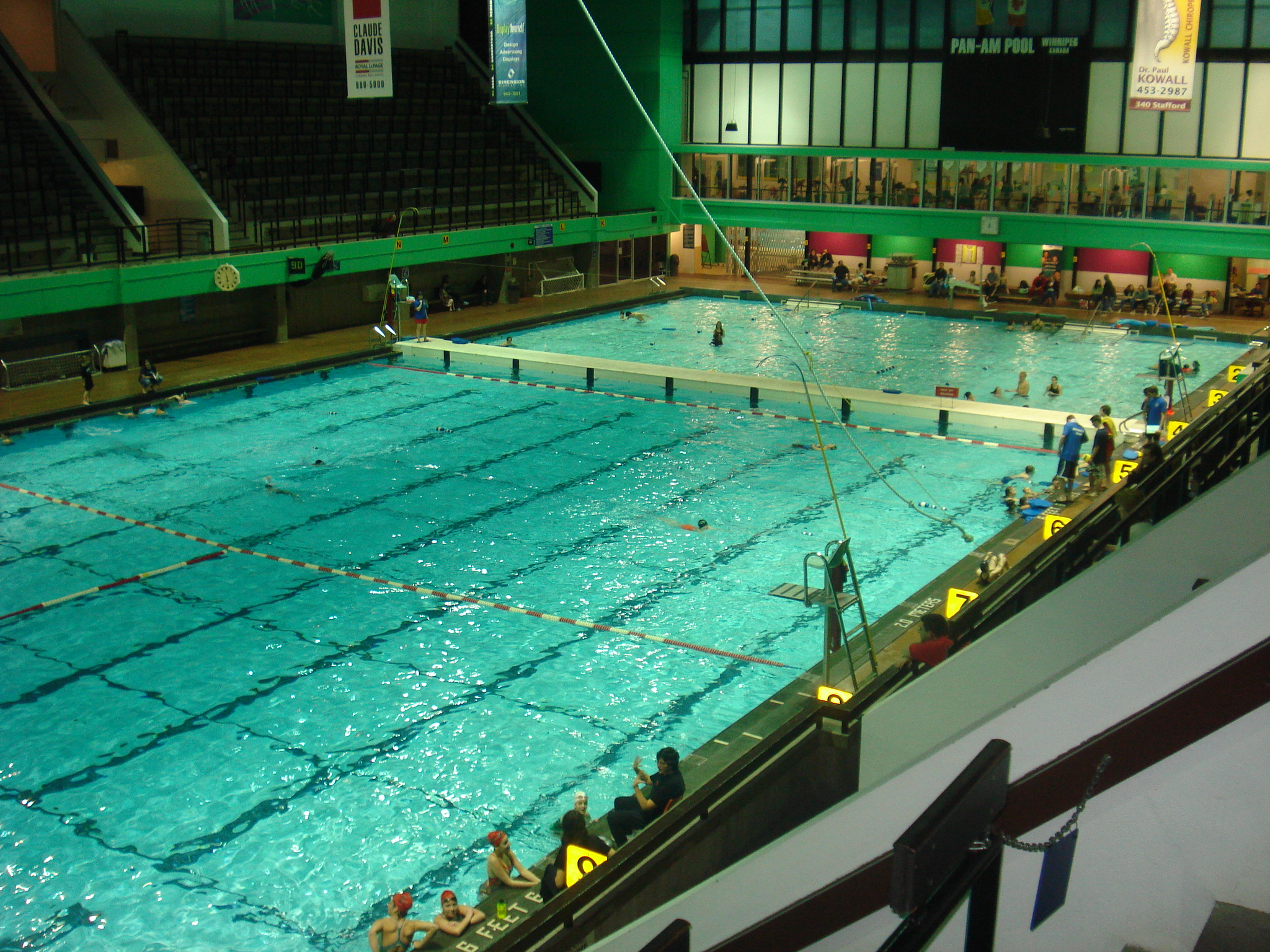
Interior pool area

== Notable competitions ==
- 1967 Pan Am Games
- 1990 Western Canada Summer Games
- 1999 Pan Am Games
- 1999 FINA Women's Water Polo Cup
- 2017 Canada Summer Games
