= Porcupine Islands =

Archipelago in Maine, USA

Coordinates: 44°23′50″N 68°10′45″W

The Porcupine Islands are an archipelago of five islands that lie in the Mount Desert Narrows of Frenchman Bay in Bar Harbor, Maine, United States. The Porcupine Islands consist of Sheep Porcupine Island, Burnt Porcupine Island, Rum Key, Long Porcupine Island, and Bald Porcupine Island. Bar Island, which is part of the same geological formation, is occasionally considered a part of the Porcupines as well. All of the islands, except for Burnt Porcupine, are maintained by the National Park Service through Acadia National Park (which is situated on the larger Mount Desert Island that the archipelago comes off). The islands also serve as nesting grounds for various sea birds, like bald eagles. The islands can be accessed through sea kayaking (or canoeing) or through local boat tours out to them.

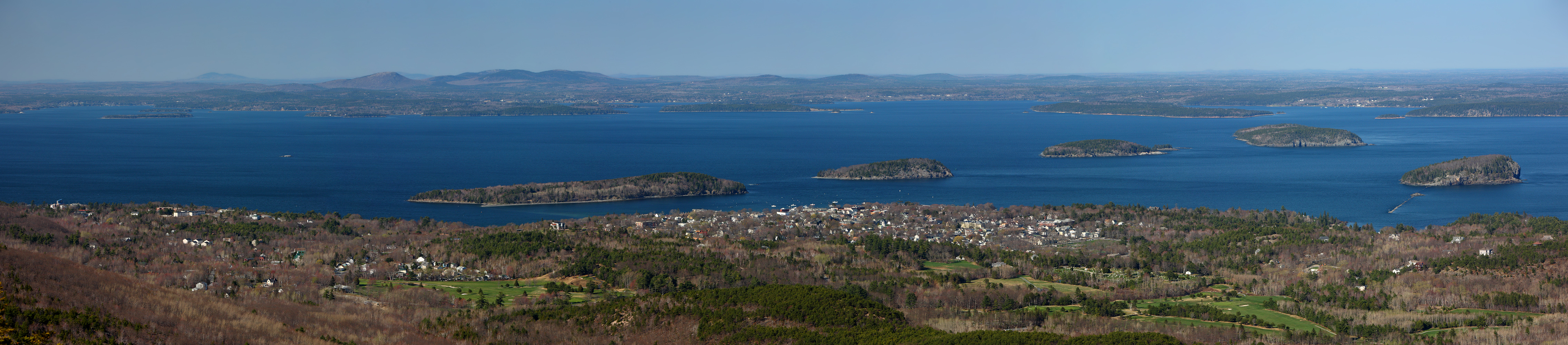
Frenchman Bay with Bar Island on the left and the Porcupine Islands (left-to-right: Sheep, Burnt, Long and Bald) around the town of Bar Harbor from the summit of Cadillac Mountain in Acadia National Park

== History ==
The Porcupine Islands served as a hiding place for Frenchmen, during the French and Indian War, who were waiting to attack British ships that came through the area. During Prohibition, rum runners ran back and forth from Canada to the United States, and hid the smuggled rum on Rum Key.

== Etymology ==
The name “Porcupine Islands” has been used to describe the islands since the late 1700s, and comes from the rounded shape of the islands and the puffy and needle-like appearance that the jagged pine trees give them.

The etymology of the individual islands
Sheep Porcupine Island	Sheep were once held on the island during the fire of 1947
Burnt Porcupine Island	The rocks that make up its base look like charcoal
Long Porcupine Island	It is the longest island of them all (about 130 acres) and rather rectangular
Bald Porcupine Island	It was once cleared for livestock grazing, leaving it bare
Rum Key	Used to store smuggled rum during Prohibition
