= Rooster Town =

Former Métis community

Rooster Town, also known as Pakan Town or Pakan Ville was a Métis road allowance community in Manitoba, Canada, located in modern-day Winnipeg.

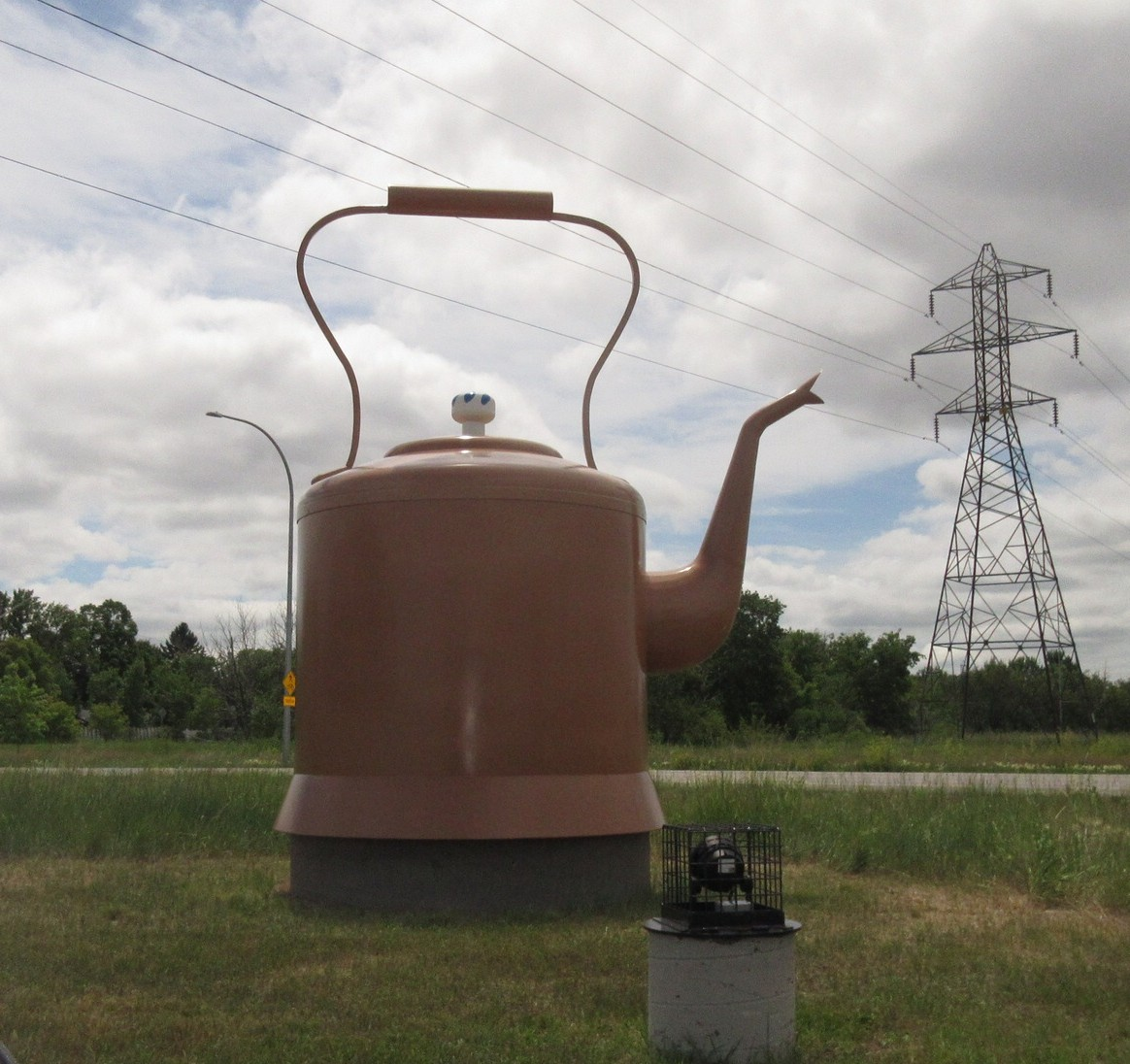
Copper kettle sculpture in north Fort Garry marking the former Rooster Town community.

This Métis settlement existed from the early 1900s to the late 1950s. The difficulty of procuring affordable housing close to other members of the Métis community had led families to the decision to build their own housing on the land. Originally located near what is now Corydon Avenue (City Route 95) in Winnipeg's River Heights neighbourhood, the community was slowly pushed further south to a more permanent location near where Grant Avenue (City Route 105) now runs to accommodate new, higher-income housing development.

Residents of the community also called the area Pakan Town and Pakan Ville for the abundance of hazelnut trees (Corylus americana, Corylus cornuta) that grew there.

The peak population of Rooster Town was from about the mid-1930s to 1945, with close to 250 residents. As of 1951, the homes had neither roads, plumbing nor sewers, and were served by a single water pump, which residents needed to travel a mile to access. That year the Winnipeg Free Press reported on the area, quoting school trustee Mrs. Nan Murphy, who described the homes as "a picture of filth and squalor", saying that they were crowded, with residents sometimes sleeping four to a bed. She suggested that the only solution was "to condemn the area and move the people out". Negative stereotypes about the area were common in newspaper reporting of the time. Lawrie Barkwell, senior historian at Louis Riel Institute, has described Rooster Town as a "working-class community with a vibrant culture".

Throughout the 1950s, many residents left under pressure from developers to relocate. During that time, Winnipeg City Council sold the land to a developer, and in 1959 then-mayor Stephen Juba and the city council evicted those dwelling in the homes, despite protest from the residents. The houses were burnt down or bulldozed to make way for Grant Park Shopping Centre and Grant Park High School.

Later scholarship, such as the book Rooster Town: The History of an Urban Métis Community, 1901–1961 by Evelyn Peters, Matthew Stock and Adrian Werner and an article by David G. Burley in Urban History Review / Revue d'histoire urbaine, has explored the long-hidden history of this community.

In 2019, the city of Winnipeg installed a public art piece, titled Rooster Town Kettle, at the Beaumont Station of the Southwest Winnipeg Transitway (49°50′53″N 97°09′59″W). Designed by Métis artist Ian August, the five-meter-tall sculpture depicts a copper kitchen kettle large enough to hold the amount of daily water that would be required for 250 people, the size of the Rooster Town community at its peak. The piece is intended as both a symbol of the Rooster Town settlement and the plight of Indigenous communities still under boil-water advisories.

In 2022, the city of Winnipeg renamed the former Pan Am Pool Park, located at Grant Avenue and Cambridge Street, to "Rooster Town Park" to honour the Métis families who were forced out of their homes. The sign was unveiled by Philip and Frank Sais, whose families lived in Rooster Town, and city councillor John Orlikow.
