= Frenchman Bay =

Body of water on the coast of Maine, United States

Coordinates: 44°24′51″N 68°11′06″W

Frenchman Bay is a bay in Hancock County, Maine, named for Samuel de Champlain, the French explorer who visited the area in 1604.

Frenchman Bay may have been the location of the Jesuit St. Sauveur mission, established in 1613.

In a 1960 book titled The Story of Mount Desert Island, Samuel Eliot Morison wrote, "Frenchmans Bay was so called because it became a staging point for French warships preparing to fight the English."

The bay is bounded on the east by the Schoodic Peninsula and on the west by Mount Desert Island; parts of both are in Acadia National Park. It contains numerous islands, the largest of which is Ironbound Island. The highest elevation of the islands in the bay is found on Jordan Island. The largest town on the bay is Bar Harbor, on Mount Desert Island.

The bay extends for roughly 15 miles (24 km) and spans 7 miles (11 km) at its widest.

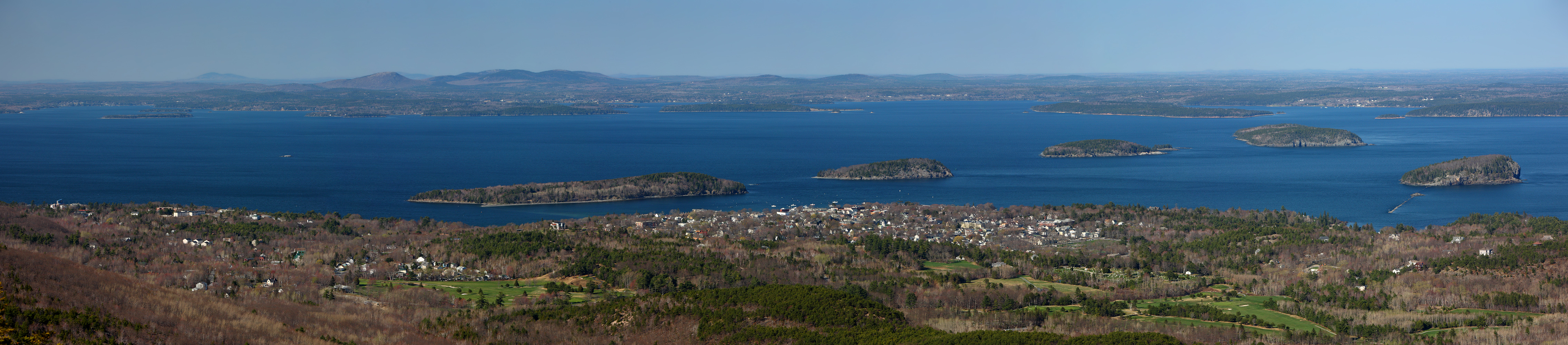
Frenchman Bay with Bar Island on the left and the Porcupine Islands (left-to-right: Sheep, Burnt, Long and Bald) around the town of Bar Harbor from the summit of Cadillac Mountain in Acadia National Park
