= Bar Island =

Tidal island across from Bar Harbor on Mount Desert Island, Maine, United States

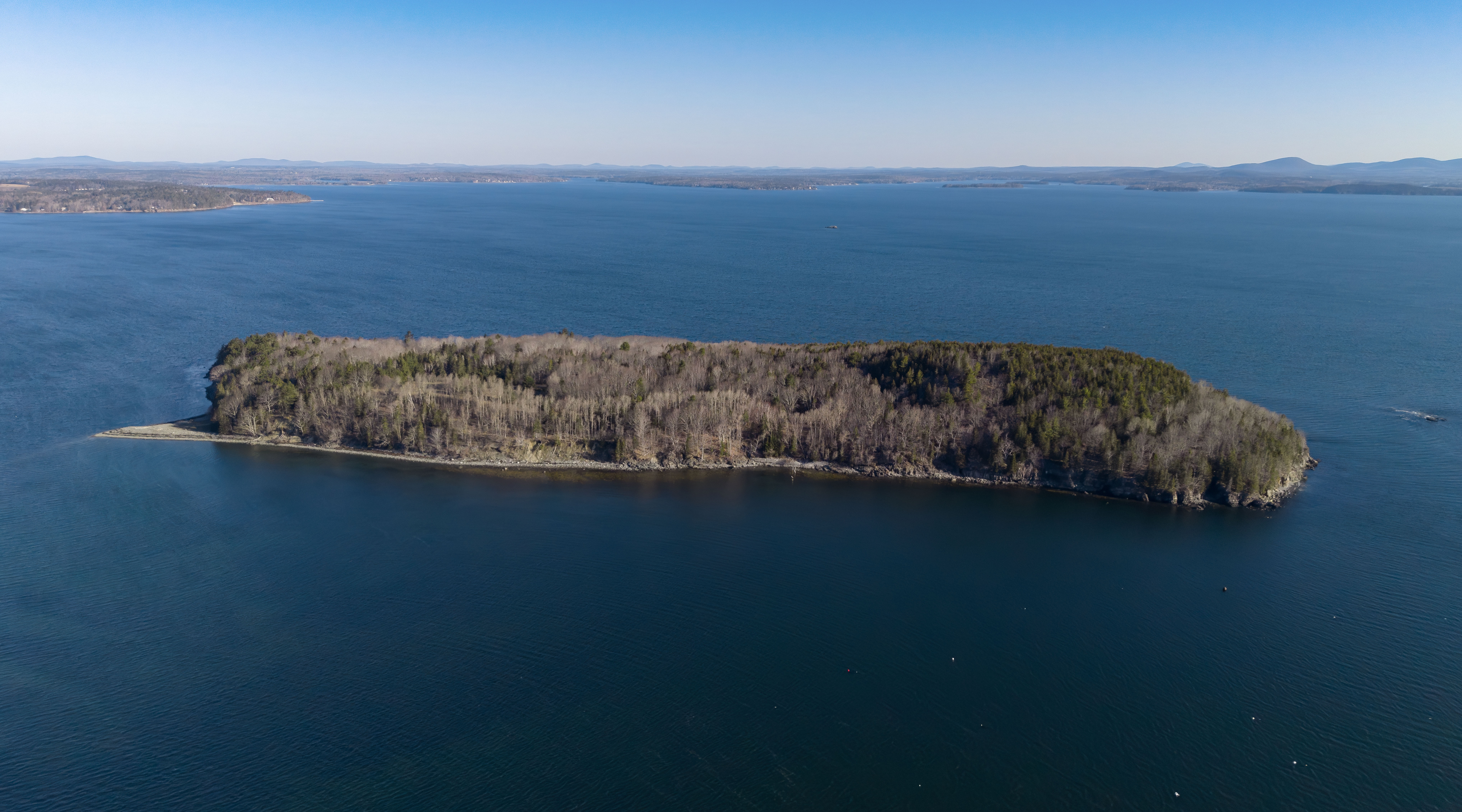
- Bar Island at high tide, 2026
- Interactive map of Bar Island

Geography
- Coordinates: 44°23′54″N 68°12′24″W

Bar Island is a tidal island across from Bar Harbor on Mount Desert Island, Maine, United States. The uninhabited island is mostly forested in pine and birch trees and the island is now part of Acadia National Park. There are walking trails on the island. A sand and gravel bar exposed only a couple of hours at low tide connects Bar Island to Bridge Street in Bar Harbor. At low tide visitors often walk across, or park cars on the exposed bar. However, on the island side in front of a locked gate, only a small area fringed with dense sea rose bushes is elevated enough to provide safe parking. Visitors have been known to return from a hike to find their cars submerging and themselves stranded until the tide recedes.

The town of Bar Harbor has repeatedly attempted to obtain jurisdiction over this island connected to it by the eponymous bar, but a 1903 court decision confirmed that the distant town of Gouldsboro retains jurisdiction under its 1798 articles of incorporation.
