= Grant Park High School =

Location
- 450 Nathaniel St. Winnipeg, Manitoba, R3M 3E3; Canada; 49.8561°N 97.1705°W

Information
- Type: Public High School
- Motto: Commitment To Excellence
- Established: 1959; 67 years ago
- School district: Winnipeg School Division
- Principal: Jamie Hutchison
- Grades: 7–12
- Enrollment: 1175
- Colours: Navy Blue & Carolina Blue
- Team name: Pirates
- Website: School website

Grant Park High School is a high school located in Winnipeg, Manitoba, Canada, that was founded in 1959. It is part of the Winnipeg School Division and teaches grades 7 to 12.

== History ==
Grant Park High School is a grade 7–12 combined high school and middle school in Winnipeg, MB. It has a population of approximately 1,200 students and 150 staff. GP is noted for academic, athletic and visual art excellence, and is a draw for many students because of the large variety of programs and courses available at the school.

The land currently occupied by the school was originally home to a longstanding Métis community commonly known by the name of Rooster Town.

Grant Park High School was officially opened on November 27, 1959. From the Winnipeg School Division history files:

Grant Park opened in 1959 with the "all-purpose" plan that was mindful of the ever-broadening concept of a high school: the original 1959 construction consisted of seventeen rooms with a visual education classroom, chemistry/physics classrooms and a biology classroom with lab, art room, library, music room, electrical and automotive industrial arts shops and an auditorium-gymnasium. In 1961 an addition was constructed which included sixteen additional classrooms, two science rooms, food and clothing labs and two additional industrial arts spaces. A larger addition was built in 1963, adding twenty-one more classrooms, science room, library, art room, language lab, a second gymnasium, lunchroom and alterations to the existing building, which have continued.

At the time of its completion and for more than a decade after that, Grant Park was the largest single-floor high school in western Canada.

Many renovations and changes have been made to the building over the years, One example is the large windows that once looked out towards Nathaniel Street that were in place at time of construction were eventually changed to the small, square windows of the present by the late nineties. The original paint scheme for the exterior emphasised the natural brick and i-beam construction of the school, a faint memory now. Legend has it that an exact copy of the original school exists somewhere in southern California - that the architect first built down there, then came up here to copy the design. The boarded up recesses in the ceiling around the school supposedly are because of this - skylights were originally installed, copying the Californian design. However, these leaked and had to be covered up, and thus the odd ceiling. Legend aside, the school as originally constructed is quite a bit different than at present. The library was renovated circa 1973, changing it to approximately the current setup. The office has been renovated more than once, with rooms changed around and walls moved. The most recent renovation (2015) was to open up the copy area into one large room and move the staff mailboxes into the main office area. Guidance has also been renovated sometime, along with various Industrial Arts classrooms. The Technology Resource Centre was created out of a few adjoining rooms in 1999-2000, with the introduction of an internet network to the school. Other renovations were also carried out the school at that time to install Ethernet cabling and update power distribution in the computer labs. The storage rooms at the end of hallway 1 (17 & 18) were once student washrooms, as recently as the early 1990s. Probably the largest renovation at the school was the creation of the Life Skills area, for Special Ed students in the early 1980s. This saw the shortening of hallway 4, and the loss of six classrooms for the creation of a complex of rooms and areas for Special Ed. There used to be a smoking hallway between halls 2 and 3. That was renovated sometime in the 1980s as well.

== Academics ==
Grant Park High School offers a wide variety of academic options. Aside from the General Learning Program, an Advanced Program (AP) is offered for gifted students, who learn above grade level. The Advanced Program is available to students in grades 7-12. Middle school students (grades 7-8) can also apply to the Flexible Learning Program (Flex), where students can learn and express their learnings in a number of creative ways. There is also a very supportive and hands-on EAL Program for students ages 14–21.

=== Courses Available ===
Grant Park has a tremendous reputation for the arts as well as sports. The varsity Pirates football team proudly won city championships in 2011. Aside from core subjects [math (pre-calculus, calculus, essential and applied math), English, social studies (geography, history), and science (biology, chemistry, physics)], courses offered include Graphics, Metals, Power Mechanics, Woodworking, Applied Technology, Apprenticeships, Career Development/Lifework, Clothing, Housing and Design, Family Studies, Food and Nutrition, Independent Living, Digital Film-Making, Interactive Media, Yearbook, French, Spanish, Computer Science, Art, Band, Choral, Dance, Jazz Band, Drama, Theatre Technology, Psychology, Community Service, Cultural Exploration, American History, First Nations, Metis and Inuit studies, and Law.

=== Performing Arts ===
Each year, all grades participate in a main show in the late fall (Ad Astra) where students showcase their talents. There are also a number of other performances throughout the year, including a middle school musical, a high school musical, several special education musicals, Two plays, (One for the high school students and one for middle school), several band concerts, dance competitions, and a middle school performing arts night. Some of these performances are held at the school, but several are held at professional theatres, including The Gas Station Theatre.

Courses available relating to performing arts include Performing Arts (7–8), Junior Drama (9), Senior Drama (10–12), Choral (9–12), Band (7–12), and Dance (9–12). There are also additional credits that the high school students can earn, including Singers, Performing Arts Credit, and Jazz Band.

== Notable alumni ==
- Jim Carr , Member of Parliament
- John Einarson, rock historian
- Bruce Flatt, CEO of Brookfield Asset Management
- Guy Gavriel Kay, author
- Andrew Harris, football player
- Samantha Hill, Broadway performer
- Jennifer McArton, diver
- Marty Morantz, Member of Parliament
- Donald John Roberts, economist, Professor at Stanford Graduate School of Business
- John "Heinrich" Kennedy , author, "I was a Middle Class Punk Rocker"
