= List of flag bearers for Panama at the Olympics =

Panama at the Olympics
- IOC code: PAN
- NOC: Comité Olímpico de Panamá
- Website: www.copanama.com (in Spanish)
- Medals: Gold 1 Silver 1 Bronze 2 Total 4

Summer appearances
- 1928; 1932–1936; 1948; 1952; 1956; 1960; 1964; 1968; 1972; 1976; 1980; 1984; 1988; 1992; 1996; 2000; 2004; 2008; 2012; 2016; 2020; 2024

This is a list of flag bearers who have represented Panama at the Olympics. Flag bearers carry the national flag of their country at the opening ceremony of the Olympic Games.

Panama competed for the first time in the Olympic Games at the 1928 Summer Olympics. Their next appearance was at the 1948 Summer Olympics and they have participated in almost every Summer Olympics since, with the exceptions of Melbourne 1956 and Moscow 1980. Panama has never competed in a Winter Olympics.

#	Event year	Season	Flag bearer	Sport	Reference
1	1928	Summer	Adán Gordón	Swimming	
2	1948	Summer			
3	1952	Summer	Carlos Chávez	Weightlifting	
4	1960	Summer			
5	1964	Summer	Lorraine Dunn	Athletics	
6	1968	Summer	Julio Osorio	Basketball	
7	1972	Summer	Donaldo Arza	Athletics	
8	1976	Summer			
9	1984	Summer	José Díaz López	Weightlifting	
10	1988	Summer	Manuel Gutiérrez	Swimming	
11	1992	Summer			
12	1996	Summer	Eileen Coparropa	Swimming	
13	2000	Summer	Eileen Coparropa	Swimming	
14	2004	Summer	Eileen Coparropa	Swimming	
15	2008	Summer	Jesika Jiménez	Fencing	
16	2012	Summer	Irving Saladino	Athletics	
17	2016	Summer	Alonso Edward	Athletics	
18	2020	Summer	Atheyna Bylon	Boxing	
18	2020	Summer	Alonso Edward	Athletics	
19	2024	Summer	Franklin Archibold	Cycling	
19	2024	Summer	Hillary Heron	Gymnastics	

== See also ==
- Panama at the Olympics
