= List of flag bearers for Panama at the Paralympics =

Panama at the Paralympics
- IOC code: PAN
- NOC: Comité Olímpico de Panamá
- Website: www.copanama.com (in Spanish)
- Medals: Gold 3 Silver 4 Bronze 1 Total 8

Summer appearances
- 1992; 1996; 2000; 2004; 2008; 2012; 2016; 2020; 2024

This is a list of flag bearers who have represented Panama at the Paraympics. Flag bearers carry the national flag of their country at the opening ceremony of the Paralympic Games.

Panama made its Paralympic Games début at the 1992 Summer Paralympics in Barcelona, with a delegation of two competitors in athletics. It has participated in every subsequent edition of the Summer Paralympics, but never in the Winter Paralympics. Panamanian delegations have always been small, never consisting in more than two competitors.

Event year	Flag bearer	Sport	Reference
1992	Said Comez	Athletics	
1996	Said Comez	Athletics	
2000	Said Comez	Athletics	
2004	Said Comez	Athletics	
2008	Said Comez	Athletics	
2012	Said Comez	Athletics	
2016	Francisco Cedeno Almengor	Athletics	
2020	Jhan Carlos Wisdom Lungrin	Athletics	
2020	Iveth Valdes Romero	Athletics	
2024	Rey Melchor Dimas Vasquez	Powerlifting	
2024	Iveth Del Rosario Valdes Romero	Athletics	

== See also ==
- Panama at the Olympics
