= Panama at the 2004 Summer Olympics =

- IOC code: PAN
- NOC: Comité Olímpico de Panamá
- Website: www.copanama.com (in Spanish)

in Athens
- Competitors: 4 in 2 sports
- Flag bearer: Eileen Coparropa
- Medals: Gold 0 Silver 0 Bronze 0 Total 0

Summer Olympics appearances (overview)
- 1928; 1932–1936; 1948; 1952; 1956; 1960; 1964; 1968; 1972; 1976; 1980; 1984; 1988; 1992; 1996; 2000; 2004; 2008; 2012; 2016; 2020; 2024

Panama competed at the 2004 Summer Olympics in Athens, Greece, from 13 to 29 August 2004. This was the nation's fourteenth appearance at the Olympics since its debut in 1920. This team consisted of two people, a man and a woman. Panama did not compete on four occasions, including the 1980 Summer Olympics in Moscow, because of its partial support of the United States boycott.

Comité Olímpico de Panamá sent the nation's smallest delegation to the Games since the 1952 Summer Olympics in Helsinki. A total of four athletes, three men and one woman, competed only in athletics and swimming. Freestyle swimmer, Pan American Games medalist, and three-time Olympian Eileen Coparropa reprised her role to carry the Panamanian flag in the opening ceremony for the third consecutive time since her debut, as a fifteen-year-old, in 1996.

Panama has yet to claim its first Olympic medal after the 1948 Summer Olympics in London. Track star Bayano Kamani narrowly missed out on the medal podium after earning a highest result for the Panamanian team in the men's 400 m hurdles with an astonishing fifth-place finish.

== Athletics ==
Panamanian athletes have so far achieved qualifying standards in the following athletics events (up to a maximum of 3 athletes in each event at the 'A' Standard, and 1 at the 'B' Standard).

Key

- Note–Ranks given for track events are within the athlete's heat only
- Q = Qualified for the next round
- q = Qualified for the next round as a fastest loser or, in field events, by position without achieving the qualifying target
- NR = National record
- N/A = Round not applicable for the event
- Bye = Athlete not required to compete in round

Men
Track & road events

Athlete	Event	Heat		Semifinal		Final	
Athlete	Event	Result	Rank	Result	Rank	Result	Rank
Bayano Kamani	400 m hurdles	49.37	5 q	48.23 NR	2 Q	48.74	5

Field events

Athlete	Event	Qualification		Final	
Athlete	Event	Distance	Position	Distance	Position
Irving Saladino	Long jump	7.42	36	did not advance	

== Swimming ==
Panamanian swimmers earned qualifying standards in the following events (up to a maximum of 2 swimmers in each event at the A-standard time, and 1 at the B-standard time):

Men

Athlete	Event	Heat		Semifinal		Final	
Athlete	Event	Time	Rank	Time	Rank	Time	Rank
Ismael Ortiz	100 m freestyle	51.74	45	did not advance			

Women

Athlete	Event	Heat		Semifinal		Final	
Athlete	Event	Time	Rank	Time	Rank	Time	Rank
Eileen Coparropa	50 m freestyle	25.57	12 Q	25.37	=13	did not advance	
Eileen Coparropa	100 m freestyle	57.09	30	did not advance			

== See also ==
- Panama at the 2003 Pan American Games
- Panama at the 2004 Summer Paralympics
