= Ricardo Torres =

Ricardo Torres may refer to:

- Ricardo Torres (boxer) (born 1980), Colombian boxer
- Ricardo Torres (baseball) (1891–1960), Major League Baseball catcher and first baseman
- Ricardo Torres (cinematographer) (born 1911), on films such as Under the Sky of Spain
- Ricardo Torres (swimmer) (born 1967), Panamanian swimmer
- Ricardo Torres Balaguer (born 1955), Spanish politician
- Ricardo Torres (Sunset Beach), a fictional character in the American soap opera Sunset Beach
