= Panama at the 1988 Summer Olympics =

- IOC code: PAN
- NOC: Comité Olímpico de Panamá

in Seoul
- Competitors: 6 in 3 sports
- Flag bearer: Manuel Gutiérrez
- Medals: Gold 0 Silver 0 Bronze 0 Total 0

Summer Olympics appearances (overview)
- 1928; 1932–1936; 1948; 1952; 1956; 1960; 1964; 1968; 1972; 1976; 1980; 1984; 1988; 1992; 1996; 2000; 2004; 2008; 2012; 2016; 2020; 2024

Panama competed at the 1988 Summer Olympics in Seoul, South Korea.

== Competitors ==
The following is the list of number of competitors in the Games.

Sport	Men	Women	Total
Swimming	1	0	1
Weightlifting	2	–	2
Wrestling	3	–	3
Total	6	0	6

== Swimming ==
Men

Athlete	Event	Heats		Final A/B	
Athlete	Event	Time	Rank	Time	Rank
Manuel Gutiérrez	100 metre breaststroke	1:06.73	49	Did not advance	
Manuel Gutiérrez	200 metre breaststroke	2:26.57	40	Did not advance	

== Weightlifting ==
Athlete	Event	Snatch		Clean & jerk		Total	Rank
Athlete	Event	Result	Rank	Result	Rank	Total	Rank
José Díaz	56 kg	95.0	19	125.0	19	220.0	19
Tómas Rodríguez	67.5 kg	117.5	18	145.0	15	262.5	15

== Wrestling ==
Greco-Roman

Athlete	Event	Group Stage								Final	
Athlete	Event	Opposition Result	Opposition Result	Opposition Result	Opposition Result	Opposition Result	Opposition Result	Opposition Result	Rank	Opposition Result	Rank
Ramón Meña	57 kg	Mourier (FRA); L 2–13	Yildiz (FRG); L 0–16	Did not advance					9	Did not advance	
Herminio Hidalgo	68 kg	Hory (SYR); W Passivity	Navarrete (ARG); W Passivity	Barcia (ESP); W Passivity	Brekke (NOR); L 1–4	Kim (KOR); L 2–18	Did not advance		5	Did not advance	

Freestyle

Athlete	Event	Group Stage								Final	
Athlete	Event	Opposition Result	Opposition Result	Opposition Result	Opposition Result	Opposition Result	Opposition Result	Opposition Result	Rank	Opposition Result	Rank
Ramón Meña	57 kg	Hollamby (NZL); L 4–12	Ivanov (BUL); L Fall	Did not advance					10	Did not advance	
Arturo Oporta	62 kg	Lehto (FIN); L 2–10	Dad (AFG); L 0–7	Did not advance					13	Did not advance	
Herminio Hidalgo	68 kg	Salbei (KEN); W 19–3	Manibog (PHI); W 15–0	Akaishi (JPN); L 0–15	Yassenov (BUL); L Fall	Did not advance			8	Did not advance	
