= Panama at the 2020 Summer Olympics =

- IOC code: PAN
- NOC: Comité Olímpico de Panamá
- Website: www.copanama.com (in Spanish)

in Tokyo, Japan July 23, 2021 – August 8, 2021
- Competitors: 10 in 5 sports
- Flag bearers (opening): Atheyna Bylon; Alonso Edward
- Flag bearer (closing): Jorge Castelblanco
- Medals: Gold 0 Silver 0 Bronze 0 Total 0

Summer Olympics appearances (overview)
- 1928; 1932–1936; 1948; 1952; 1956; 1960; 1964; 1968; 1972; 1976; 1980; 1984; 1988; 1992; 1996; 2000; 2004; 2008; 2012; 2016; 2020; 2024

Panama competed at the 2020 Summer Olympics in Tokyo. Originally scheduled to take place from 24 July to 9 August 2020, the Games were postponed to 23 July to 8 August 2021, due to the COVID-19 pandemic. It was the nation's eighteenth appearance at the Summer Olympics, since its debut in 1928.

== Competitors ==
The following is the list of competitors participating at the Games by numbers:

Sport	Men	Women	Total
Athletics	2	2	4
Boxing	0	1	1
Cycling	1	0	1
Judo	0	2	2
Swimming	1	1	2
Total	4	6	10

== Athletics ==
Panamanian athletes achieved the entry standards, either by qualifying time or by world ranking, in the following track and field events (up to a maximum of 3 athletes in each event):

Key

- Note–Ranks given for track events are within the athlete's heat only
- Q = Qualified for the next round
- q = Qualified for the next round as a fastest loser or, in field events, by position without achieving the qualifying target
- NR = National record
- N/A = Round not applicable for the event
- Bye = Athlete not required to compete in round

Track & road events

Athlete	Event	Heat		Semifinal		Final	
Athlete	Event	Result	Rank	Result	Rank	Result	Rank
Alonso Edward	Men's 200 m	20.60	2 Q	DNF		Did not advance	
Jorge Castelblanco	Men's marathon	—N/a				2:33:22	75
Gianna Woodruff	Women's 400 m hurdles	55.49	2 Q	54.22 NR	2 Q	55.84	7

Field events

Athlete	Event	Qualification		Final	
Athlete	Event	Distance	Position	Distance	Position
Nathalee Aranda	Women's long jump	6.12	27	Did not advance	

== Boxing ==
Panama entered one female boxer into the Olympic tournament. With the cancellation of the 2021 Pan American Qualification Tournament in Buenos Aires, Argentina, Rio 2016 Olympian Atheyna Bylon finished among the top three of the women's middleweight category to secure her place in the Panamanian squad based on the IOC's Boxing Task Force Rankings for the Americas.

Athlete	Event	Round of 16	Quarterfinals	Semifinals	Final	
Athlete	Event	Opposition Result	Opposition Result	Opposition Result	Opposition Result	Rank
Atheyna Bylon	Women's middleweight	Parker (AUS); W 5–0	Price (GBR); L 0–5	Did not advance		

== Cycling ==
=== Road ===
Panama entered one rider each to compete in the men's Olympic road race by finishing in the top two, not yet qualified, at the 2019 Pan American Championships in Mexico, marking the country's debut in the sport.

Athlete	Event	Time	Rank
Christofer Jurado	Men's road race	Did not finish	

== Judo ==
Panama qualified two judoka for each of the following weight classes at the Games. Representing Germany in two previous editions, Miryam Roper was selected among the top 18 judoka of the women's lightweight (57 kg) based on the IJF World Ranking List of June 28, 2021, while rookie Kristine Jiménez (women's half-heavyweight, 52 kg) accepted a continental berth from the Americas as the nation's top-ranked judoka outside of direct qualifying position.

Athlete	Event	Round of 32	Round of 16	Quarterfinals	Semifinals	Repechage	Final / BM	
Athlete	Event	Opposition Result	Opposition Result	Opposition Result	Opposition Result	Opposition Result	Opposition Result	Rank
Kristine Jiménez	Women's –52 kg	Kuziutina (ROC); L 00–10	Did not advance					
Miryam Roper	Women's –57 kg	Kim J-s (KOR); L 00–10	Did not advance					

== Swimming ==
Panama received a universality invitation from FINA to send two top-ranked swimmers (one per gender) in their respective individual events to the Olympics, based on the FINA Points System and/or Olympic Selection Time (OST).

Athlete	Event	Heat		Semifinal		Final	
Athlete	Event	Time	Rank	Time	Rank	Time	Rank
Tyler Christianson	Men's 200 m breaststroke	2:13.41	29	Did not advance			
Tyler Christianson	Men's 200 m individual medley	2:02.70	40	Did not advance			
Emily Santos	Women's 100 m breaststroke	1:12.10	35	Did not advance			

== See also ==
- Panama at the 2019 Pan American Games
