= Panama at the 1984 Summer Olympics =

- IOC code: PAN
- NOC: Comité Olímpico de Panamá

in Los Angeles
- Competitors: 8 (7 men and 1 woman) in 5 sports
- Flag bearer: José Díaz López
- Medals: Gold 0 Silver 0 Bronze 0 Total 0

Summer Olympics appearances (overview)
- 1928; 1932–1936; 1948; 1952; 1956; 1960; 1964; 1968; 1972; 1976; 1980; 1984; 1988; 1992; 1996; 2000; 2004; 2008; 2012; 2016; 2020; 2024

Panama competed at the 1984 Summer Olympics in Los Angeles, United States. The nation returned to the Olympic Games after participating in the American-led boycott of the 1980 Summer Olympics. Eight competitors, seven men and one woman, took part in ten events in five sports.

== Athletics ==
- Florencio Aguilar
- Alfonso Pitters

== Fencing ==
One female fencer represented Panama in 1984.

Women's foil

- Barbra Higgins

== Swimming ==
Men's 100m Breaststroke

- Manuel Gutiérrez

- Heat — 1:06.07 (→ did not advance, 26th place)

Men's 200m Breaststroke

- Manuel Gutiérrez

- Heat — 2:23.02
- B-Final — 2:23.13 (→ 16th place)

Men's 200m Individual Medley

- Manuel Gutiérrez

- Heat — DSQ (→ did not advance, no ranking)

== Weightlifting ==
- José Díaz López
- Tómas Rodríguez
- Ricardo Salas

== Wrestling ==
- Saúl Leslie
