= Panama at the 1996 Summer Paralympics =

- IPC code: PAN
- NPC: Paralympic Committee of Panama

in Atlanta
- Competitors: 1
- Medals Ranked 42nd: Gold 2 Silver 0 Bronze 0 Total 2

Summer Paralympics appearances (overview)
- 1992; 1996; 2000; 2004; 2008; 2012; 2016; 2020; 2024

One male athlete from Panama competed at the 1996 Summer Paralympics in Atlanta, United States and won two gold medals for his country.

== Medallists ==
Medal	Name	Sport	Event
Gold	Said Gomez	Athletics	Men's 1500m T12
Gold	Said Gomez	Athletics	Men's 5000m T12

== See also ==
- Panama at the Paralympics
- Panama at the 1996 Summer Olympics
