= Panama at the 2008 Summer Olympics =

- IOC code: PAN
- NOC: Comité Olímpico de Panamá
- Website: www.copanama.com (in Spanish)

in Beijing
- Competitors: 5 in 3 sports
- Flag bearer: Jesika Jiménez
- Medals Ranked 52nd: Gold 1 Silver 0 Bronze 0 Total 1

Summer Olympics appearances (overview)
- 1928; 1932–1936; 1948; 1952; 1956; 1960; 1964; 1968; 1972; 1976; 1980; 1984; 1988; 1992; 1996; 2000; 2004; 2008; 2012; 2016; 2020; 2024

Panama competed in the 2008 Summer Olympics which was held in Beijing, People's Republic of China from August 8 to August 24, 2008. Yesika Jimenez was the delegation's flagbearer at the Opening Ceremony.

Panama's participation was initially uncertain. The country was suspended by the International Olympic Committee in July 2007, due to what was described as government interference in Panama's National Olympic Committee. The suspension was lifted in April 2008, enabling the country's athletes to compete for qualification at the Beijing Games.

== Medalists ==
Medal	Name	Sport	Event	Date
Gold	Irving Saladino	Athletics	Men's long jump	August 18

== Athletics ==
Key

- Note–Ranks given for track events are within the athlete's heat only
- Q = Qualified for the next round
- q = Qualified for the next round as a fastest loser or, in field events, by position without achieving the qualifying target
- NR = National record
- N/A = Round not applicable for the event
- Bye = Athlete not required to compete in round

Men
Track & road events

Athlete	Event	Heat		Semifinal		Final	
Athlete	Event	Result	Rank	Result	Rank	Result	Rank
Bayano Kamani	400 m hurdles	49.05	4 q	50.48	8	Did not advance	

Field events

Athlete	Event	Qualification		Final	
Athlete	Event	Distance	Position	Distance	Position
Irving Saladino	Long jump	8.01	9 q	8.34	1st place, gold medalist(s)

== Fencing ==
Jesika Jiménez represented Panama.

Women

Athlete	Event	Round of 32	Round of 16	Quarterfinal	Semifinal	Final / BM	
Athlete	Event	Opposition Score	Opposition Score	Opposition Score	Opposition Score	Opposition Score	Rank
Jesika Jiménez	Individual épée	Shemyakina (UKR); W 15–13	Duplitzer (GER); L 10–15	Did not advance			

== Swimming ==
Men

Athlete	Event	Heat		Semifinal		Final	
Athlete	Event	Time	Rank	Time	Rank	Time	Rank
Édgar Crespo	100 m breaststroke	1:03.72	53	Did not advance			

Women

Athlete	Event	Heat		Semifinal		Final	
Athlete	Event	Time	Rank	Time	Rank	Time	Rank
Christie Bodden	100 m backstroke	1:07.18	47	Did not advance			

== See also ==
- Panama at the 2007 Pan American Games
- Panama at the 2010 Central American and Caribbean Games
