= Fencing at the 2008 Summer Olympics – Women's épée =

Women's épée at the Games of the XXIX Olympiad
- Venue: Olympic Green Convention Centre
- Date: 13 August 2008
- Competitors: 25 from 20 nations

Medalists
1st place, gold medalist(s)		Britta Heidemann	Germany
2nd place, silver medalist(s)		Ana Maria Brânză	Romania
3rd place, bronze medalist(s)		Ildikó Mincza-Nébald	Hungary

The women's épée fencing competition at the 2008 Summer Olympics in Beijing took place on August 13 at the Olympic Green Convention Centre.

The épée competition consisted of a five-round single-elimination bracket with a bronze medal match between the two semifinal losers. Fencing was done to 15 touches or to the completion of three three-minute rounds if neither fencer reached 15 touches by then.

At the end of time, the higher-scoring fencer was the winner; a tie resulted in an additional one-minute sudden-death time period. This sudden-death period was further modified by the selection of a draw-winner beforehand; if neither fencer scored a touch during the minute, the predetermined draw-winner won the bout.

== Draw ==
=== Finals ===
Semifinals
Britta Heidemann (GER)	15
Li Na (CHN)	13
Ildikó Mincza-Nébald (HUN)	14
Ana Maria Brânză (ROU)	15

Final
Britta Heidemann (GER)	15
Ana Maria Brânză (ROU)	11
Bronze medal match
Li Na (CHN)	11
Ildikó Mincza-Nébald (HUN)	15

=== Section 1 ===
Round of 32
17	Kelley Hurley (USA)	6
16	Jung Hyo-Jung (KOR)	15
9	Tatiana Logounova (RUS)	6
24	Emma Samuelsson (SWE)	15
25	Aya El Sayed (EGY)	7
8	Hajnalka Kiraly Picot (FRA)	15
21	Noam Mills (ISR)	8
12	Laura Flessel-Colovic (FRA)	15
13	Sophie Lamon (SUI)	15
20	María Martínez (VEN)	9

Round of 16
1	Britta Heidemann (GER)	12
16	Jung Hyo-Jung (KOR)	5
24	Emma Samuelsson (SWE)	15
8	Hajnalka Kiraly Picot (FRA)	13
5	Zhong Weiping (CHN)	11
12	Laura Flessel-Colovic (FRA)	13
13	Sophie Lamon (SUI)	10
4	Li Na (CHN)	15

Quarterfinals
1	Britta Heidemann (GER)	15
24	Emma Samuelsson (SWE)	10
12	Laura Flessel-Colovic (FRA)	10
4	Li Na (CHN)	15

Semifinals
1	Britta Heidemann (GER)	15
4	Li Na (CHN)	13

=== Section 2 ===
Round of 32
19	Jesika Jiménez (PAN)	15
14	Yana Shemyakina (UKR)	13
11	Ildikó Mincza-Nébald (HUN)	15
22	Yeung Chui Ling (HKG)	11
23	Hadia Bentaleb (ALG)	4
10	Emese Szász (HUN)	15
15	Megumi Harada (JPN)	15
18	Amber Parkinson (AUS)	9

Round of 16
3	Imke Duplitzer (GER)	15
19	Jesika Jiménez (PAN)	10
11	Ildikó Mincza-Nébald (HUN)	15
6	Sherraine Schalm (CAN)	13
7	Lubov Shutova (RUS)	15
10	Emese Szász (HUN)	12
15	Megumi Harada (JPN)	11
2	Ana Maria Brânză (ROU)	15

Quarterfinals
3	Imke Duplitzer (GER)	11
11	Ildikó Mincza-Nébald (HUN)	15
7	Lubov Shutova (RUS)	13
2	Ana Maria Brânză (ROU)	15

Semifinals
11	Ildikó Mincza-Nébald (HUN)	14
2	Ana Maria Brânză (ROU)	15

== Final classification ==
Rank	Athlete	Nation
1st place, gold medalist(s)	Britta Heidemann	Germany
2nd place, silver medalist(s)	Ana Maria Brânză	Romania
3rd place, bronze medalist(s)	Ildikó Mincza-Nébald	Hungary
4	Na Li	China
5	Imke Duplitzer	Germany
6	Lubov Shutova	Russia
7	Laura Flessel-Colovic	France
8	Emma Samuelsson	Sweden
9	Sherraine Schalm	Canada
10	Weiping Zhong	China
11	Hajnalka Kiraly Picot	France
12	Emese Szász	Hungary
13	Sophie Lamon	Switzerland
14	Hyo-Jung Jung	South Korea
15	Megumi Harada	Japan
16	Jesika Jiménez	Panama
17	Tatiana Logounova	Russia
18	Yana Shemyakina	Ukraine
19	Amber Parkinson	Australia
20	Kelley Hurley	United States
21	María Martínez	Venezuela
22	Noam Mills	Israel
23	Chui Ling Yeung	Hong Kong
24	Hadia Bentaleb	Algeria
25	Aya El Sayed	Egypt
