= Castelblanco =

Castelblanco is a Spanish surname. Notable people with the surname include:

- Jorge Castelblanco (born 1987), long-distance runner from Panama
- José Castelblanco (born 1969), Colombian cyclist
- Pedro Castelblanco (1894–1982), Chilean lawyer, diplomat, and politician
