= Panama at the 2000 Summer Olympics =

- IOC code: PAN
- NOC: Panama Olympic Committee
- Website: www.copanama.com (in Spanish)

in Sydney
- Competitors: 6 in 5 sports
- Flag bearer: Eileen Coparropa
- Medals: Gold 0 Silver 0 Bronze 0 Total 0

Summer Olympics appearances (overview)
- 1928; 1932–1936; 1948; 1952; 1956; 1960; 1964; 1968; 1972; 1976; 1980; 1984; 1988; 1992; 1996; 2000; 2004; 2008; 2012; 2016; 2020; 2024

Panama was represented at the 2000 Summer Olympics in Sydney, New South Wales, Australia by the Panama Olympic Committee.

In total, six athletes including four men and two women represented Panama in five different sports including athletics, judo, shooting, swimming and weightlifting.

== Background ==
Panama made their Olympic debut at the 1928 Summer Olympics in Amsterdam, Netherlands. They competed sporadically until the 1960s. Since the 1960 Summer Olympics in Rome, Italy, Panama have only missed the 1980 Summer Olympics in Moscow, Russian Soviet Federative Socialist Republic, Soviet Union after taking part in the United States-led boycott. The 2000 Summer Olympics in Sydney, New South Wales, Australia marked their 13th appearance at the Olympics.

== Competitors ==
In total, six athletes represented Panama at the 2000 Summer Olympics in Sydney, New South Wales, Australia across five different sports.

Sport	Men	Women	Total
Athletics	1	0	1
Judo	0	1	1
Shooting	1	0	1
Swimming	1	1	2
Weightlifting	1	0	1
Total	4	2	6

== Athletics ==
In total, one Panamanian athlete participated in the athletics events – Curt Young in the men's 400 m hurdles.

Athlete	Event	Heat		Quarterfinal		Semifinal		Final	
Athlete	Event	Time	Rank	Time	Rank	Time	Rank	Time	Rank
Curt Young	Men's 400 m hurdles	—		52.46	6	Did not advance			

== Judo ==
In total, one Panamanian athlete participated in the judo events – Estela Riley in the women's +78 kg category.

Athlete	Event	Round of 32	Round of 16	Quarterfinals	Semifinals	Repechage 1	Repechage 2	Repechage 3	Final / BM	
Athlete	Event	Opposition Result	Opposition Result	Opposition Result	Opposition Result	Opposition Result	Opposition Result	Opposition Result	Opposition Result	Rank
Estela Riley	Women's +78 kg	Iredale (NZL); L	Did not advance							

== Shooting ==
In total, one Panamanian athlete participated in the shooting events – Ricardo Chandeck in the men's 10 m air pistol.

Athlete	Event	Qualification		Final		Total	
Athlete	Event	Points	Rank	Points	Rank	Points	Rank
Ricardo Chandeck	Men's 10 m air pistol	562	37	Did not advance			

== Swimming ==
In total, two Panamanian athletes participated in the swimming events – Ivan Rodriguez-Mesa in the men's 100 m breaststroke and Eileen Coparropa in the women's 50 m freestyle and the women's 100 m freestyle.

Athlete	Event	Heat		Semifinals		Final	
Athlete	Event	Time	Rank	Time	Rank	Time	Rank
Ivan Rodriguez-Mesa	Men's 100 m breaststroke	1:04.68	44	Did not advance			
Eileen Coparropa	Women's 50 m freestyle	26.19	27	Did not advance			
Eileen Coparropa	Women's 100 m freestyle	57.82	32	Did not advance			

== Weightlifting ==
In total, one Panamanian athlete participated in the weightlifting events – Alexis Batista in the men's –69 kg category.

Athlete	Event	Snatch			Clean & Jerk			Total	Rank
Athlete	Event	1	2	3	1	2	3	Total	Rank
Alexis Batista	Men's –69 kg	~~112.5~~	~~112.5~~	112.5	~~130.0~~	~~130.0~~	130.0	242.5	16

== See also ==
- Panama at the 1999 Pan American Games
