= Panama at the 2012 Summer Paralympics =

- IPC code: PAN
- NPC: Paralympic Committee of Panama

in London
- Competitors: 2 in 1 sport
- Medals: Gold 0 Silver 0 Bronze 0 Total 0

Summer Paralympics appearances (overview)
- 1992; 1996; 2000; 2004; 2008; 2012; 2016; 2020; 2024

Panama competed at the 2012 Summer Paralympics in London, United Kingdom from August 29 to September 9, 2012.

== Athletics ==
Men’s Track and Road Events

Athlete	Event	Heat		Final	
Athlete	Event	Result	Rank	Result	Rank
Said Gomez	800m T13	2:10.57	6	did not advance	
Said Gomez	1500m T13	4:33.48	11	did not advance	

Women’s Track and Road Events

Athlete	Event	Heat		Semifinal		Final	
Athlete	Event	Result	Rank	Result	Rank	Result	Rank
Katherina Taylor	200m T11	32.76	3	did not advance			
Katherina Taylor	400m T12	1:14.76	4	did not advance			

== See also ==
- Panama at the 2012 Summer Olympics
