= Panama at the 2000 Summer Paralympics =

- IPC code: PAN
- NPC: Paralympic Committee of Panama

in Sydney
- Competitors: 1 in 1 sport
- Flag bearer: Said Gomez
- Medals Ranked 58th: Gold 0 Silver 1 Bronze 1 Total 2

Summer Paralympics appearances (overview)
- 1992; 1996; 2000; 2004; 2008; 2012; 2016; 2020; 2024

There were 0 female and 1 male athletes representing the country at the 2000 Summer Paralympics.

== Medallists ==
Medal	Name	Sport	Event
Silver	Said Gomez	Athletics	Men's 5000m T13
Bronze	Said Gomez	Athletics	Men's 1500m T13

== See also ==
- Panama at the 2000 Summer Olympics
- Panama at the Paralympics

== Bibliography ==
- International Paralympic Committee (2000). "Appendix C: Athlete Numbers - By Delegation". Sydney 2000 Paralympic Games Post Games Report. Sydney.
