= Gordón =

Gordón can refer to:

- La Pola de Gordón, municipality in Leon, Spain
- Gordón (surname)

== See also ==
- Gordon (disambiguation)
