= Panama at the 2008 Summer Paralympics =

- IPC code: PAN
- NPC: Paralympic Committee of Panama

in Beijing
- Competitors: 2 in 2 sports
- Medals: Gold 0 Silver 0 Bronze 0 Total 0

Summer Paralympics appearances (overview)
- 1992; 1996; 2000; 2004; 2008; 2012; 2016; 2020; 2024

Panama sent a delegation to compete at the 2008 Summer Paralympics in Beijing, People's Republic of China. It consisted of runner Said Gomez and swimmer Desirée Aguilar. Their results are detailed below.

Visually impaired runner Said Gomez was making his fifth appearance at the Paralympics, having competed continuously since Panama's first participation in the Paralympics in 1992. He had, over the previous Games, won a total of eight medals, of which three gold, which constituted the totality of Panama's Paralympic medals. The Beijing Games were the first at which he failed to win a medal.

== Athletics ==
Men

Athlete	Class	Event	Heats		Semifinal		Final		
Athlete	Class	Event	Result	Rank	Result	Rank	Result	Points	Rank
Said Gomez	T13	1500 m	4:19.60	5	did not advance				
Said Gomez	T13	5000 m	16:54.95	8	did not advance				

== Swimming ==
Women

Athlete	Class	Event	Heats		Final	
Athlete	Class	Event	Result	Rank	Result	Rank
Desirée Aguilar	S8	50 m freestyle	43.22	15	did not advance	
Desirée Aguilar	S8	100 m freestyle	1:31.84	16	did not advance	

== See also ==
- Panama at the Paralympics
- Panama at the 2008 Summer Olympics
