= Panama at the 1976 Summer Olympics =

- IOC code: PAN
- NOC: Comité Olímpico de Panamá

in Montreal
- Competitors: 8 (7 men and 1 woman) in 5 sports
- Medals: Gold 0 Silver 0 Bronze 0 Total 0

Summer Olympics appearances (overview)
- 1928; 1932–1936; 1948; 1952; 1956; 1960; 1964; 1968; 1972; 1976; 1980; 1984; 1988; 1992; 1996; 2000; 2004; 2008; 2012; 2016; 2020; 2024; 2028

Panama competed at the 1976 Summer Olympics in Montreal, Canada.

== Results by event ==
=== Athletics ===
- Guy Abrahams

=== Judo ===
- Jorge Comrie

=== Swimming ===
- Carlos González
- Georgina Osorio
- Gianni Versari

=== Weightlifting ===
- Narcisco Orán
- Pablo Justiniani

=== Wrestling ===
- Segundo Olmedo
