= Panama at the 1972 Summer Olympics =

- IOC code: PAN
- NOC: Comité Olímpico de Panamá

in Munich
- Competitors: 7 (7 men and 0 women) in 4 sports
- Flag bearer: Donaldo Arza
- Medals: Gold 0 Silver 0 Bronze 0 Total 0

Summer Olympics appearances (overview)
- 1928; 1932–1936; 1948; 1952; 1956; 1960; 1964; 1968; 1972; 1976; 1980; 1984; 1988; 1992; 1996; 2000; 2004; 2008; 2012; 2016; 2020; 2024

Panama competed at the 1972 Summer Olympics in Munich, West Germany.

== Results by event ==
=== Athletics ===
Men's 800 metres

- Donaldo Arza

- Heat — 1:51.2 (→ did not advance)

Men's 1500 metres

- Donaldo Arza

- Heat — 3:41.7 (→ did not advance)

=== Boxing ===
Men's Bantamweight (– 54 kg)

- Luis Ávila

- First Round — Lost to Juan Francisco Rodríguez (ESP), 0:5

Men's Lightweight (– 60 kg)

- Roy Hurdley

- First Round — Lost to Ivan Mikhaylov (BUL), referee stopped contest

=== Weightlifting ===
Men's Lightweight

- Ildefonso Lee

Men's Heavyweight

- Henry Phillips

=== Wrestling ===
Men's Freestyle Flyweight

- Wanelge Castillo

Men's Freestyle Lightweight

- Segundo Olmedo
