= Panama at the 1968 Summer Olympics =

- IOC code: PAN
- NOC: Comité Olímpico de Panamá

in Mexico City
- Competitors: 16 (16 men and 0 women) in 3 sports
- Flag bearer: Julio Osorio
- Medals: Gold 0 Silver 0 Bronze 0 Total 0

Summer Olympics appearances (overview)
- 1928; 1932–1936; 1948; 1952; 1956; 1960; 1964; 1968; 1972; 1976; 1980; 1984; 1988; 1992; 1996; 2000; 2004; 2008; 2012; 2016; 2020; 2024

Panama competed at the 1968 Summer Olympics in Mexico City, Mexico.

== Results by event ==
=== Basketball ===
==== Men's team competition ====
- Preliminary Round (Group A)

- Lost to Yugoslavia (85-96)
- Lost to Italy (87-94)
- Lost to Spain (82-88)
- Defeated Philippines (95-92)
- Lost to United States (60-95)
- Lost to Puerto Rico (69-80)
- Defeated Senegal (94-79)

- Classification Matches

- 9th/12th place: Lost to Bulgaria (79-83)
- 11th/12th place: Lost to Cuba (88-91)

- Team Roster

- Calixto Malcom
- Davis Peralta
- Eliécer Ellis
- Ernesto Agard
- Francisco Checa
- Julio Osorio
- Luis Sinclair
- Nicolas Alvarado
- Norris Webb
- Pedro Rivas
- Percibal Blades
- Ramón Reyes

=== Weightlifting ===
Men's Bantamweight

- Guillermo Boyd

Men's Featherweight

- Ildefonso Lee

=== Wrestling ===
Men's Freestyle Flyweight

- Wanelge Castillo

Men's Freestyle Lightweight

- Severino Aguilar

== Sources ==
- sports-reference
- Official Olympic Reports
