= Panama at the 1948 Summer Olympics =

- IOC code: PAN
- NOC: Comité Olímpico de Panamá

in London
- Competitors: 1 in 1 sport
- Medals Ranked 32nd: Gold 0 Silver 0 Bronze 2 Total 2

Summer Olympics appearances (overview)
- 1928; 1932–1936; 1948; 1952; 1956; 1960; 1964; 1968; 1972; 1976; 1980; 1984; 1988; 1992; 1996; 2000; 2004; 2008; 2012; 2016; 2020; 2024; 2028

Panama competed at the 1948 Summer Olympics in London, England, returning to the Olympic Games for the first time since 1928. Panama won its first-ever Olympic medals at these Games, and did not win another Olympic medal until Irving Saladino won gold at the 2008 Summer Olympics.

== Medalists ==
| Medal | Name | Sport | Event | Date |
|---|---|---|---|---|
| Bronze | Lloyd LaBeach | Athletics | 100m | 31 July |
| Bronze | Lloyd LaBeach | Athletics | 200m | 3 August |

== Athletics ==
Key

- Note–Ranks given for track events are within the athlete's heat only
- Q = Qualified for the next round
- q = Qualified for the next round as a fastest loser or, in field events, by position without achieving the qualifying target
- NR = National record
- N/A = Round not applicable for the event
- Bye = Athlete not required to compete in round
- NP = Not placed

Men
Track & road events

| Athlete | Event | Heat | | Quarterfinal | | Semifinal | | Final | |
| Athlete | Event | Result | Rank | Result | Rank | Result | Rank | Result | Rank |
|---|---|---|---|---|---|---|---|---|---|
| Lloyd LaBeach | 100 m | 10.5 | 1 Q | 10.5 | 1 Q | 10.5 | 2 Q | 10.6 | 3rd place, bronze medalist(s) |
| Lloyd LaBeach | 200 m | 21.4 | 1 Q | 21.7 | 1 Q | 21.6 | 2 Q | 21.2 | 3rd place, bronze medalist(s) |
