= Athletics at the 1964 Summer Olympics – Women's 100 metres =

Women's 100 metres at the Games of the XVIII Olympiad
- Venue: Olympic Stadium
- Dates: 15–16 October 1964
- Competitors: 45 from 27 nations
- Winning time: 11.4

Medalists
1st place, gold medalist(s)		Wyomia Tyus; United States
2nd place, silver medalist(s)		Edith McGuire; United States
3rd place, bronze medalist(s)		Ewa Kłobukowska; Poland

The women's 100 metres was the shortest of the four women's track races in the Athletics at the 1964 Summer Olympics program in Tokyo. It was held on 15 October and 16 October 1964. 45 athletes from 27 nations entered, with 1 not starting in the first round. The first two rounds were held on 15 October, with the semifinals and the final on 16 October.

== Results ==
=== First round ===
The top five runners in each of the 6 heats advanced.

==== Heat 1 ====
Wind: +2.1 m/s

Rank	Athlete	Nation	Time (hand)	Time (automatic)	Notes
1	Marilyn White	United States	11.4	11.50	Q
2	Daphne Arden	Great Britain	11.5	11.55	Q
3	Renate Lace	Soviet Union	11.6	11.70	Q
4	Dianne Bowering-Burge	Australia	11.8	11.83	Q
5	Rose Hart	Ghana	11.9	11.98	Q
6	Erzsébet Bartos	Hungary	11.9	12.01	
7	Mona Sulaiman	Philippines	12.0	12.01	
—	Jean Mitchell	Panama	DNS	–	

==== Heat 2 ====
Wind: +1.3 m/s

Rank	Athlete	Nation	Time (hand)	Time (automatic)	Notes
1	Edith McGuire	United States	11.4	11.47	Q
2	Barbara Sobotta	Poland	11.8	11.89	Q
3	Christiane Cadic	France	12.0	12.00	Q
4	Renate Meyer	United Team of Germany	12.0	12.01	Q
5	Inge Aigner	Austria	12.0	12.05	Q
6	Marcela Daniel	Panama	12.6	12.60	
7	Simin Safamehr	Iran	13.2	–	

==== Heat 3 ====
Wind: +0.8 m/s

Rank	Athlete	Nation	Time (hand)	Time (automatic)	Notes
1	Ewa Kłobukowska	Poland	11.4	11.45	Q
2	Margit Nemesházi	Hungary	11.7	11.73	Q
3	Daniele Gueneau	France	12.0	12.02	Q
4	Avis McIntosh	New Zealand	12.0	12.06	Q
5	Ulla-Britt Wieslander	Sweden	12.0	12.10	Q
6	Louise Sydranski	Israel	12.1	12.16	
—	Erika Pollmann	United Team of Germany	DSQ	–	

==== Heat 4 ====
Wind: +0.5 m/s

Rank	Athlete	Nation	Time (hand)	Time (automatic)	Notes
1	Dorothy Hyman	Great Britain	11.6	11.64	Q
2	Doreen Porter	New Zealand	11.7	11.77	Q
3	Galina Popova	Soviet Union	11.8	11.82	Q
4	Clarice Ahanotu	Nigeria	11.9	11.95	Q
5	Irene Muyanga	Uganda	12.0	12.05	Q
6	Johanna Bijleveld	Netherlands	12.3	12.35	
7	Delceita Oakley	Panama	12.3	12.38	

==== Heat 5 ====
Wind: 3.3 m/s

Rank	Athlete	Nation	Time (hand)	Time (automatic)	Notes
1	Wyomia Tyus	United States	11.3	11.35	Q
2	Halina Górecka	Poland	11.5	11.56	Q
3	Irene Piotrowski	Canada	11.5	11.59	Q
4	Margaret Burvill	Australia	11.6	11.68	Q
5	Carmen Smith	Jamaica	11.7	11.79	Q
6	Esperanza Girón	Mexico	12.2	12.21	
7	Kusolwan Sorut	Thailand	12.6	–	
8	Christiana Boateng	Ghana	12.9	–	

==== Heat 6 ====
Wind: +0.3 m/s

Rank	Athlete	Nation	Time (hand)	Time (automatic)	Notes
1	Marilyn Black	Australia	11.5	11.58	Q
2	Miguelina Cobián	Cuba	11.6	11.67	Q
3	Eva Lehocká	Czechoslovakia	11.8	11.89	Q
4	Galina Gayda	Soviet Union	11.9	11.94	Q
5	Heilwig Jacob	United Team of Germany	11.9	11.96	Q
6	Madeleine Cobb	Great Britain	12.0	12.01	
7	Margarita Formeiro	Argentina	12.2	12.20	
8	Song Yang-ja	South Korea	12.7	–	

=== Second round ===
The top four runners in each of the four heats advanced to the semifinals.

==== Quarterfinal 1 ====
Wind: +0.3 m/s

Rank	Athlete	Nation	Time (hand)	Time (automatic)	Notes
1	Wyomia Tyus	United States	11.2	11.23	Q, OR, =WR
2	Dorothy Hyman	Great Britain	11.5	11.54	Q
3	Galina Popova	Soviet Union	11.5	11.54	Q
4	Irene Piotrowski	Canada	11.6	11.63	Q
5	Barbara Sobotta	Poland	11.8	11.84	
6	Avis McIntosh^{†}	New Zealand	12.0	12.06	
7	Irene Muyanga	Uganda	12.2	12.24	

^{†} In the Second Round results as per the Official Olympic report, Avis McIntosh, of New Zealand, was erroneously mentioned as a Dutch athlete.

==== Quarterfinal 2 ====
Wind: +1.2 m/s

Rank	Athlete	Nation	Time (hand)	Notes
1	Marilyn Black	Australia	11.4	Q
2	Marilyn White	United States	11.5	Q
3	Renate Lace	Soviet Union	11.6	Q
4	Carmen L. Smith	Jamaica	11.7	Q
5	Heilwig Jacob	United Team of Germany	11.7	
6	Danielle Guéneau	France	11.8	
7	Clarice Ahanotu	Nigeria	11.8	
8	Ulla-Britt Wieslander	Sweden	11.9	

==== Quarterfinal 3 ====
Wind: +3.7 m/s

Rank	Athlete	Nation	Time (hand)	Notes
1	Edith McGuire	United States	11.4	Q
2	Halina Górecka	Poland	11.5	Q
3	Miguelina Cobián	Cuba	11.5	Q
4	Marko Nemeshazi	Hungary	11.5	Q
5	Dianne Marie Bowering	Australia	11.7	
6	Rose Hart	Ghana	11.9	
7	Inge Aigner	Austria	12.0	
8	Renate Meyer	United Team of Germany	12.1	

==== Quarterfinal 4 ====
Wind: +1.9 m/s

Rank	Athlete	Nation	Time (hand)	Notes
1	Ewa Kłobukowska	Poland	11.4	Q
2	Daphne Arden	Great Britain	11.5	Q
3	Eva Lehocká	Czechoslovakia	11.6	Q
4	Margaret Burvill	Australia	11.7	Q
5	Doreen Porter	New Zealand	11.8	
6	Christiane Cadic	France	12.0	
7	Galina Gaida	Soviet Union	12.0	

=== Semifinals ===
The top four runners in each of the two semifinals advanced to the final.

==== Semifinal 1 ====
Wind: +0.2 m/s

Rank	Athlete	Nation	Time (hand)	Time (automatic)	Notes
1	Miguelina Cobián	Cuba	11.6	11.62	Q
2	Marilyn Black	Australia	11.6	11.63	Q
3	Edith McGuire	United States	11.6	11.67	Q
4	Halina Górecka	Poland	11.7	11.74	Q
5	Galina Popova	Soviet Union	11.8	11.83	
6	Daphne Arden	Great Britain	11.8	11.84	
7	Eva Lehocká	Czechoslovakia	11.9	11.91	
8	Carmen L. Smith	Jamaica	11.9	11.99	

==== Semifinal 2 ====
Wind: +1.4 m/s

Rank	Athlete	Nation	Time (hand)	Time (automatic)	Notes
1	Wyomia Tyus	United States	11.3	11.40	Q
2	Ewa Kłobukowska	Poland	11.4	11.42	Q
3	Marilyn White	United States	11.5	11.51	Q
4	Dorothy Hyman	Great Britain	11.6	11.66	Q
5	Irene Piotrowski	Canada	11.7	11.74	
6	Renate Lace	Soviet Union	11.7	11.76	
7	Marko Nemeshazi	Hungary	11.7	11.77	
8	Margaret Burvill	Australia	11.8	11.85	

=== Final ===
Wind: -1.2 m/s

Rank	Athlete	Nation	Time (hand)	Time (automatic)	Notes
1st place, gold medalist(s)	Wyomia Tyus	United States	11.4	11.49	
2nd place, silver medalist(s)	Edith McGuire	United States	11.6	11.62	
3rd place, bronze medalist(s)	Ewa Kłobukowska	Poland	11.6	11.64	
4	Marilyn White	United States	11.6	11.67	
5	Miguelina Cobián	Cuba	11.7	11.72	
6	Marilyn Black	Australia	11.7	11.73	
7	Halina Górecka	Poland	11.8	11.83	
8	Dorothy Hyman	Great Britain	11.9	11.90	
