= Panama at the 2016 Summer Olympics =

- IOC code: PAN
- NOC: Comité Olímpico de Panamá
- Website: www.copanama.com (in Spanish)

in Rio de Janeiro
- Competitors: 10 in 7 sports
- Flag bearer: Alonso Edward
- Medals: Gold 0 Silver 0 Bronze 0 Total 0

Summer Olympics appearances (overview)
- 1928; 1932–1936; 1948; 1952; 1956; 1960; 1964; 1968; 1972; 1976; 1980; 1984; 1988; 1992; 1996; 2000; 2004; 2008; 2012; 2016; 2020; 2024

Panama competed at the 2016 Summer Olympics in Rio de Janeiro, Brazil, from 5 to 21 August 2016. This was the nation's seventeenth appearance at the Summer Olympics, since its debut in 1928.

Panama Olympic Committee (Spanish: Comité Olímpico de Panamá) sent the nation's largest delegation to the Games since 1968, with the women outnumbering the men for the first time in its history. A total of 10 athletes, 4 men and 6 women, were selected to the Panamanian squad across seven sports. Artistic gymnastics and women's boxing were the only sporting events in which Panama had its debut in Rio de Janeiro.

Among the nation's athletes on the roster, three of them returned from London 2012, including taekwondo fighter Carolena Carstens (women's 57 kg), breaststroke swimmer Édgar Crespo, who attended his third straight Games as the most experienced competitor, and sprinter Alonso Edward, who was nominated by the committee to carry the Panamanian flag at the opening ceremony.

Panama, however, failed to win a single Olympic medal, since the 2008 Summer Olympics in Beijing, where Irving Saladino became the nation's first ever champion in the long jump. At the Games, Edward improved upon his false start disaster from London 2012 to produce Panama's most substantial result with a seventh-place finish in the final of the men's 200 metres.

== Athletics (track and field) ==
Panamanian athletes have so far achieved qualifying standards in the following athletics events (up to a maximum of 3 athletes in each event):

Key

- Note–Ranks given for track events are within the athlete's heat only
- Q = Qualified for the next round
- q = Qualified for the next round as a fastest loser or, in field events, by position without achieving the qualifying target
- NR = National record
- N/A = Round not applicable for the event
- Bye = Athlete not required to compete in round

Track & road events

| Athlete | Event | Heat | | Semifinal | | Final | |
| Athlete | Event | Result | Rank | Result | Rank | Result | Rank |
|---|---|---|---|---|---|---|---|
| Alonso Edward | Men's 200 m | 20.19 | 1 Q | 20.07 | 1 Q | 20.23 | 7 |
| Jorge Castelblanco | Men's marathon | —N/a | | | | 2:39:25 | 135 |
| Yvette Lewis | Women's 100 m hurdles | 13.35 | 8 | Did not advance | | | |

== Boxing ==
Panama has received an invitation from the Tripartite Commission to send a female boxer competing in the middleweight division to the Games.

| Athlete | Event | Round of 16 | Quarterfinals | Semifinals | Final | |
| Athlete | Event | Opposition Result | Opposition Result | Opposition Result | Opposition Result | Rank |
|---|---|---|---|---|---|---|
| Atheyna Bylon | Women's middleweight | Bandeira (BRA); L 1–2 | Did not advance | | | |

== Fencing ==
Panama has entered one fencer into the Olympic competition, signifying the country's return to the sport after an eight-year hiatus. Eileen Grench received a spare Olympic berth freed up by Dominican Republic's Rossy Félix, who was ordered a two-month suspension from FIE for her acts of disobedience, as the next highest-ranked fencer, not yet qualified, in the women's sabre at the Pan American Zonal Qualifier in San José, Costa Rica.

| Athlete | Event | Round of 64 | Round of 32 | Round of 16 | Quarterfinal | Semifinal | Final / BM | |
| Athlete | Event | Opposition Score | Opposition Score | Opposition Score | Opposition Score | Opposition Score | Opposition Score | Rank |
|---|---|---|---|---|---|---|---|---|
| Eileen Grench | Women's sabre | Aoki (JPN); W 15–5 | Zagunis (USA); L 4–15 | Did not advance | | | | |

== Gymnastics ==
=== Artistic ===
Panama has received an invitation from the Tripartite Commission to send a female gymnast to the Games, signifying the nation's Olympic debut in the sport.

Women

| Athlete | Event | Qualification | | | | | | Final | | | | | |
| Athlete | Event | Apparatus | | | | Total | Rank | Apparatus | | | | Total | Rank |
| Athlete | Event | V | UB | BB | F | Total | Rank | V | UB | BB | F | Total | Rank |
|---|---|---|---|---|---|---|---|---|---|---|---|---|---|
| Isabella Amado Medrano | All-around | 13.900 | 12.733 | 13.333 | 12.866 | 52.832 | 44 | Did not advance | | | | | |

== Shooting ==
Panama has received an invitation from the Tripartite Commission to send a men's pistol shooter to the Olympics, signifying the nation's comeback to the sport for the first time since 2000.

| Athlete | Event | Qualification | | Final | |
| Athlete | Event | Points | Rank | Points | Rank |
|---|---|---|---|---|---|
| David Muñoz | Men's 10 m air pistol | 563 | 46 | Did not advance | |
| David Muñoz | Men's 50 m pistol | 528 | 40 | Did not advance | |

Qualification Legend: Q = Qualify for the next round; q = Qualify for the bronze medal (shotgun)

== Swimming ==
Panama has received a Universality invitation from FINA to send two swimmers (one male and one female) to the Olympics.

| Athlete | Event | Heat | | Semifinal | | Final | |
| Athlete | Event | Time | Rank | Time | Rank | Time | Rank |
|---|---|---|---|---|---|---|---|
| Édgar Crespo | Men's 100 m breaststroke | 1:02.78 | 41 | Did not advance | | | |
| María Far Núñez | Women's 200 m butterfly | 2:23.89 | 27 | Did not advance | | | |

== Taekwondo ==
Panama entered one athlete into the taekwondo competition at the Olympics. 2012 Olympian Carolena Carstens secured a spot in the women's lightweight category (57 kg) by virtue of her top two finish at the 2016 Pan American Qualification Tournament in Aguascalientes, Mexico.

| Athlete | Event | Round of 16 | Quarterfinals | Semifinals | Repechage | Final / BM | |
| Athlete | Event | Opposition Result | Opposition Result | Opposition Result | Opposition Result | Opposition Result | Rank |
|---|---|---|---|---|---|---|---|
| Carolena Carstens | Women's −57 kg | Asemani (BEL); L 1–13 PTG | Did not advance | | | | |

== See also ==
- Panama at the 2015 Pan American Games
