= Panama at the 2024 Summer Paralympics =

- Flag of Panama
- IPC code: PAN
- NPC: Panama Paralympic Committee

in Paris, 2024 August 28, 2024 – September 8, 2024
- Competitors: 3 in 3 sports
- Flag bearers: Rey Melchor Dimas Vasquez; Iveth del Rosario Valdes Romero
- Medals: Gold 0 Silver 0 Bronze 0 Total 0

Summer Paralympics appearances (overview)
- 1992; 1996; 2000; 2004; 2008; 2012; 2016; 2020; 2024

Panama competed at the 2024 Summer Paralympics in Paris, France, from 28 August to 8 September.

== Competitors ==
The following is the list of number of competitors in the Games.

Sport	Men	Women	Total
Athletics	0	1	1
Cycling	1	0	1
Powerlifting	1	0	1
Total	2	1	3

== Athletics ==
Key

- Note–Ranks given for track events are within the athlete's heat only
- Q = Qualified for the next round
- q = Qualified for the next round as a fastest loser or, in field events, by position without achieving the qualifying target
- DQ = Disqualified
- PR = Paralympic Record
- AR = Area (or continental) Record
- NR = National Record
- SB = Season's Best
- N/A = Round not applicable for the event
- Bye = Athlete not required to compete in round

Women

Athlete	Event	Final	
Athlete	Event	Distance	Position
Iveth del Rosario Valdes Romero	Women's discus throw F55	DNS	

== Cycling ==
Panama sent one male para-cyclist after finished the top eligible nation's at the 2022 UCI Nation's ranking allocation ranking.

=== Road ===
Men

Athlete	Event	Time	Rank
Esteban Goddard Medica	Men's road race C1-3	2:08:22	25
Esteban Goddard Medica	Men's time trial C2	24:01.55	10

=== Track ===
Men

Athlete	Event	Qualification		Final	
Athlete	Event	Result	Rank	Result	Rank
Esteban Goddard Medica	Men's time trial C1-3	1:20.113	16	Did not advance	
Esteban Goddard Medica	Men's pursuit C2	4:15.860	8	Did not advance	

== Powerlifting ==
Athlete	Event	Attempts (kg)				Result (kg)	Rank
Athlete	Event	1	2	3	4	Result (kg)	Rank
Rey Melchor Dimas Vasquez	Men's 72 kg					200	5

== See also ==
- Panama at the 2023 Parapan American Games
- Panama at the 2024 Summer Olympics
- Panama at the Paralympics
