= Iván Rodríguez (disambiguation) =

Iván Rodríguez (born 1971) is a Puerto Rican baseball player.

Iván Rodríguez may also refer to:

- Iván Rodríguez (sprinter) (born 1937), Puerto Rican sprinter
- Iván Rodríguez Traverzo (born 1975), Puerto Rican politician
- Iván Rodríguez Mesa (born 1977), Panamanian swimmer
- Iván Rodríguez (hurdler) (born 1978), Spanish hurdler
- Iván Rodríguez (footballer, born 1996), Spanish footballer
- Iván Rodríguez (footballer, born 2006), Andorran footballer

== See also ==
- Eduardo Iván Rodríguez, Spanish hurdler
