= Song Yang-ja =

South Korean sprinter

Personal information
- Nationality: South Korean
- Born: 19 June 1944 (age 81)

Sport
- Sport: Sprinting
- Event: 100 metres

Song Yang-ja (born 19 June 1944) is a South Korean sprinter. She competed in the women's 100 metres at the 1964 Summer Olympics.
