= Panama at the 1960 Summer Olympics =

- IOC code: PAN
- NOC: Comité Olímpico de Panamá

in Rome
- Medals: Gold 0 Silver 0 Bronze 0 Total 0

Summer Olympics appearances (overview)
- 1928; 1932–1936; 1948; 1952; 1956; 1960; 1964; 1968; 1972; 1976; 1980; 1984; 1988; 1992; 1996; 2000; 2004; 2008; 2012; 2016; 2020; 2024; 2028

Panama participated in the 1960 Summer Olympics held in Rome, Italy, marking its fourth appearance at the Summer Games since its debut in 1928. The delegation reflected Panama’s ongoing but limited investment in international sport during the mid-20th century, a period characterized by modest government support and limited sports infrastructure.

== Team ==
The Panamanian team for the Rome Games consisted of a small group of male athletes, competing mainly in track and field events as well as weightlifting.

== Wrestling ==
Panama was in the Bantamweight, Freestyle, Men Category of Wrestling, their Wrestler was named Eduardo Campbell with his final DNS equaling to 10
