= Panama at the 2016 Summer Paralympics =

- IPC code: PAN
- NPC: Paralympic Committee of Panama

in Rio de Janeiro
- Competitors: 2 in 1 sports
- Flag bearer: Francisco Cedeno Almengor
- Medals: Gold 0 Silver 0 Bronze 0 Total 0

Summer Paralympics appearances (overview)
- 1992; 1996; 2000; 2004; 2008; 2012; 2016; 2020; 2024

Panama sent a delegation to compete at the 2016 Summer Paralympics in Rio de Janeiro, Brazil, from 7–18 September 2016. This was the nation's seventh time competing in the Summer Paralympic Games after it first entered the movement at the 1992 Summer Paralympics. The Panamanian delegation to Rio de Janeiro consisted of two athletes: shot put thrower Francisco Cedeño Almengor and javelin thrower Iveth Valdes Romero. Almengor ranked eleventh out of twelve athletes in the men's shot put F54–55 competition and Romero placed in the same position in the women's javelin F55–F56 event.

== Background ==
Panama first entered the Paralympic movement at the 1992 Summer Paralympics in Barcelona, Spain, and the country has participated in every Summer Paralympic Games since. This made Rio de Janeiro their seventh appearance at a Summer Paralympiad. Entering the Rio Paralympics, Panama has won eight Paralympic medals but none since the 2004 Athens Summer Games. The 2016 Summer Paralympics were held from 7–18 September 2016 with a total of 4,328 athletes representing 159 National Paralympic Committees taking part. The Panamanian delegation to Rio de Janeiro was announced by the Paralympic Committee of Panama on 29 July 2016. It consisted of two athletes: shot put thrower Francisco Cedeño Almengor and javelin thrower Iveth Valdes Romero. They were joined by chef de mission Yanelis Rodríguez, Paralympic Committee of Panama technical director Ana de Girón and coaches Andrés Rodríguez and Orestes Pérez. The delegation travelled to Rio de Janeiro on the afternoon of 31 August. Almengor was chosen to be the Panamanian flag bearer at the parade of nations for the opening ceremony.

== Disability classifications ==
Every participant at the Paralympics has their disability grouped into one of five disability categories; amputation, the condition may be congenital or sustained through injury or illness; cerebral palsy; wheelchair athletes, there is often overlap between this and other categories; visual impairment, including blindness; Les autres, any physical disability that does not fall strictly under one of the other categories, for example dwarfism or multiple sclerosis. Each Paralympic sport then has its own classifications, dependent upon the specific physical demands of competition. Events are given a code, made of numbers and letters, describing the type of event and classification of the athletes competing. Some sports, such as athletics, divide athletes by both the category and severity of their disabilities, other sports, for example swimming, group competitors from different categories together, the only separation being based on the severity of the disability.

== Athletics ==
Francisco Cedeño Almengor is paralyzed from the waist down due to spinal cord injuries he sustained by a June 2003 automobile accident caused by an intoxicated driver in La Chorrera and he has used a wheelchair since. He is classified as F55 by the International Paralympic Committee (IPC) and competes in a sitting position. Almengor was 37 years old at the time of the Rio Paralympics and it was his first time competing in any Paralympic Games. He earned qualification to the Games because his throw of 9.44 metres in the men's shot put F54–55 at the 2015 Parapan American Games was 0.44 metres better than the "B" qualifying standard for that discipline. Before the Paralympics, Almengor said to La Prensa that he did not wish to predict the result of his event but promised to perform to the best of his ability. On 16 September, he took part in the men's shot put F54–55 competition, finishing eleventh out of twelve athletes who started the event, with a throw of 9.16 metres. (Note: One athlete, Ricardo Nunes, did not start.)

Iveth Valdes Romero was 39 years old at the time of the Rio Summer Paralympics and was also debuting in the Paralympic Games. She was left paralyzed from the waist down after an automobile driven by an allegedly intoxicated driver collided with her vehicle and sent it down a ravine in Campana on 19 July 2009. Romero is classified as F56 by the IPC and competes in a sitting position. She qualified for the Games by receiving a wild card invitation because her throw of 11 metres in the women's javelin F55–F56 was a metre off the "B" qualifying standard for her event. Romero stated before the Paralympics that while she was nervous about competing, she promised to perform to the best of her ability, and vowed to improve her personal best mark. On 10 September, she competed in the women's javelin F55–F56 event. Romero was given three attempts to set a mark and her best throw was set during her first try at 13.57 metres. This ranked her in eleventh place out of twelve participants.

=== Men's Field ===
Athlete	Events	Result	Rank
Francisco Cedeño Almengor	Shot Put F54–55	9.16	11

=== Women's Field ===
Athlete	Events	Result	Rank
Iveth Valdes Romero	Javelin F55–56	13.57	11

== See also ==
- Panama at the 2016 Summer Olympics
