= Gordón (surname) =

Gordón is a surname. Notable people with the surname include:

- Adán Gordón (1906–1966), Panamanian mechanic and swimmer
- Gonzalo Ávila Gordón (born 1998), Spanish football right-back
- Juan Santiago Gordón (born 1943), Chilean hurdler
