= List of Panamanian records in athletics =

The following are the national records in athletics in Panama maintained by its national athletics federation: Federación Panameña de Atletismo (FEPAT).

== Outdoor ==
Key to tables: Awaiting ratification Record not kept by FEPAT Not ratified or later rescinded by FEPAT

=== Men ===
Event	Record	Athlete	Date	Meet	Place	Ref.	Video
100 m	10.01 A (−0.7 m/s)	Alonso Edward	6 June 2018	South American Games	Cochabamba, Bolivia		
150 m (straight)	15.09 (+1.1 m/s)	Alonso Edward	4 June 2017	Boost Boston Games	Boston, United States		
200 m	19.81 (−0.3 m/s)	Alonso Edward	20 August 2009	World Championships	Berlin, Germany		
200 m straight	20.03 (+0.3 m/s)	Alonso Edward	20 May 2018	Adidas Boost Boston Games	Boston, United States		
400 m	45.29	Héctor Daley	15 August 1981		Bolívar, ?		
800 m	1:45.27	Chamar Chambers	11 May 2024	Ibero-American Championships	Cuiabá, Brazil		
1500 m	3:41.73	Donaldo Arza	8 September 1972	Olympic Games	Munich, Germany		
3000 m	8:18.86	Didier Rodríguez	9 June 2026	Reunion Internacional Ciudad de Guadalajara	Guadalajara, Spain		
5000 m	14:03.30	Didier Rodríguez	20 May 2026	Desafio Nerja	Nerja, Spain		
5 km (road)	15:01+	Jorge Castelblanco	13 October 2024	Chicago Marathon	Chicago, United States		
10,000 m	30:07.0 h	Agustin Morán	22 March 1997		Panama City, Panama		
10 km (road)	30:12+	Jorge Castelblanco	13 October 2024	Chicago Marathon	Chicago, United States		
15 km (road)	45:34+	Jorge Castelblanco	18 February 2024	Seville Marathon	Seville, Spain		
20 km (road)	1:00:42+	Jorge Castelblanco	18 February 2024	Seville Marathon	Seville, Spain		
Half marathon	1:04:03+	Jorge Castelblanco	18 February 2024	Seville Marathon	Seville, Spain		
25 km (road)	1:15:52+	Jorge Castelblanco	18 February 2024	Seville Marathon	Seville, Spain		
30 km (road)	1:30:56+	Jorge Castelblanco	18 February 2024	Seville Marathon	Seville, Spain		
Marathon	2:09:24	Jorge Castelblanco	18 February 2024	Seville Marathon	Seville, Spain		
110 m hurdles	13.65	Curt Young	23 May 1998		Mexico City, Mexico		
400 m hurdles	47.84	Bayano Kamani	7 August 2005	World Championships	Helsinki, Finland		
3000 m steeplechase	8:31.89	Didier Rodriguez	25 September 2026	South American Games	Santa Fe, Argentina		
High jump	2.21 m	Alexander Bowen Jr.	9 May 2015	Ualbany Purple & Gold Last Chance Meet	Albany, United States		
Pole vault	4.75 m	Antonio Morales	21 May 1999		Fairfax, United States		
Long jump	8.73 m (+1.2 m/s)	Irving Saladino	24 May 2008	Fanny Blankers-Koen Games	Hengelo, Netherlands		
Triple jump	15.50 m	Michael Thompson	4 May 2007		Dickinson, United States		
Shot put	15.81 m A	Guillermo Morrison	18 May 2002		Colorado Springs, United States		
Discus throw	50.15 m	Guillermo Morrison	30 March 2002		El Paso, United States		
Hammer throw	46.42 m	René Lynch	26 November 1975		San José, Costa Rica		
Javelin throw	66.68 m	Jonathan Cedeño	30 April 2016		Panama City, Panama		
Decathlon	7043 pts	Antonio Morales	20–21 May 1999		Fairfax, United States		
Decathlon	100m (wind) / Long jump (wind) / Shot put / High jump / 400m / 110m H (wind) / Discus / Pole vault / Javelin / 1500m; 11.45 / 6.82 m / 11.30 m / 1.98 m / 50.39 / 15.77 / 32.94 m / 4.75 m / 46.06 m / 4:34.45						
10,000 m walk (track)	42:03.55	Yassir Cabrera	23 April 2017	Lima Grand Prix	Lima, Peru		
20,000 m walk (track)	1:30:17.52	Yassir Cabrera	30 May 2021	South American Championships	Guayaquil, Ecuador		
20 km walk (road)	1:23:43	Yassir Cabrera	8 June 2019		A Coruña, Spain		
35 km walk (road)	2:39:22	Yassir Cabrera	23 April 2022	Dudinská Päťdesiatka	Dudince, Slovakia		
50 km walk (road)	4:37:17	Leonel Ramos	17 April 1983		Mexico City, Mexico		
4 × 100 m relay	40.07	Panama; Andrés Rodríguez; Anghelo Edmund; Jonathan Gibson; Alonso Edward	9 May 2007		Caracas, Venezuela		
4 × 400 m relay	3:09.67	Panama; Jonathan Gibson; Anghelo Edmund; Andrés Rodríguez; Alonso Edward	9 June 2007	South American Championships	São Paulo, Brazil		

=== Women ===
Event	Record	Athlete	Date	Meet	Place	Ref.
100 m	11.55 (+1.9 m/s)	Yasmin Woodruff	26 June 2016		Chula Vista, United States	
200 m	23.49 (+1.8 m/s)	Yasmin Woodruff	18 June 2016	Central American Championships	San Salvador, El Salvador	
400 m	52.43	Gianna Woodruff	23 April 2022		Waco, United States	
400 m	52.43	Gianna Woodruff	2 May 2026	LSU Invitational	Baton Rouge, United States	
600 m	1:31.80	Gianna Woodruff	10 March 2018	Northridge CSUN All Comers	Northridge, United States	
800 m	2:01.63	Andrea Ferris	12 May 2012	Ponce Grand Prix	Ponce, Puerto Rico	
1500 m	4:15.22	Andrea Ferris	26 November 2013	Bolivarian Games	Trujillo, Peru	
Mile	4:45.86	Rolanda Bell	25 April 2015	Penn Relays	Philadelphia, United States	
3000 m	9:45.00	Andrea Ferris	26 May 2010	GP Internacional Caixa Sesi	Uberlândia, Brazil	
5000 m	17:27.7	María Teresia Ferris	6 May 2011		Lima, Peru	
5 km (road)	16:35	Rolanda Bell	27 May 2013		Ridgewood, United States	
10,000 m	37:14.99	María Teresia Ferris	16 April 2011	Campeonato Nacional Mayor de Atletismo	Panama City, Panama	
10 km (road)	36:22+	Rolanda Bell	16 May 2015	Brooklyn Half Marathon	Brooklyn, United States	
15 km (road)	53:58+	Rolanda Bell	16 May 2015	Brooklyn Half Marathon	Brooklyn, United States	
20 km (road)	1:12:09+	Rolanda Bell	16 May 2015	Brooklyn Half Marathon	Brooklyn, United States	
Half marathon	1:16:01	Rolanda Bell	16 May 2015	Brooklyn Half Marathon	Brooklyn, United States	
25 km (road)	1:38:05+	Danielle Wagner	10 April 2016	Rotterdam Marathon	Rotterdam, Netherlands	
30 km (road)	1:58:34+	Danielle Wagner	10 April 2016	Rotterdam Marathon	Rotterdam, Netherlands	
Marathon	2:49:28	Danielle Wagner	29 May 2016	Ottawa Race Weekend	Ottawa, Canada	
100 m hurdles	12.86 A (+0.9 m/s)	Yvette Lewis	16 August 2014	Pan American Sports Festival	Mexico City, Mexico	
200 m hurdles (bend)	26.35 (−1.0 m/s)	Gianna Woodruff	13 March 2018 (Note: by Atletismo Sudamericano source; 10 March 2018 by World Athletics source)	Northridge CSUN All Comers	Northridge, United States	
200 m hurdles (straight)	26.12 (−0.2 m/s)	Gianna Woodruff	4 June 2017	Boost Boston Games	Boston, United States	
300 m hurdles	38.30	Gianna Woodruff	8 May 2026	Arkansas Twilight	Fayetteville, United States	
400 m hurdles	52.66	Gianna Woodruff	17 September 2025	World Championships	Tokyo, Japan	
3000 m steeplechase	9:47.16	Rolanda Bell	13 June 2015	Adidas Grand Prix	New York City, United States	
High jump	1.84 m	Kashany Rios	16 June 2012	23rd Central American Championships	Managua, Nicaragua	
Pole vault						
Long jump	6.60 m A (+0.8 m/s)	Nathalee Aranda	6 June 2018	South American Games	Cochabamba, Bolivia	
Triple jump	12.58 m	Jen Clayton	12 May 2013	USA Outdoor Champ	Houston, United States	
Triple jump	12.58 m (+1.2 m/s)	Ana Martínez	30 April 2016	Panamanian Championships	Panama City, Panama	
Shot put	14.16 m	Theresa Findlay	11 May 1996		Medford, United States	
Discus throw	55.00 m	Aixa Middleton	27 June 2015	CAC Championships	Managua, Nicaragua	
Hammer throw	60.04 m	Theresa Findlay	1 June 1996		Eugene, United States	
Javelin throw	46.46 m	Rocio Navarro	18 April 2010	Juegos Centroamericanos	Panama City, Panama	
Heptathlon	4998 pts	Irina Ambulo	30 June – 1 July 1986	Central American and Caribbean Games	Santiago, Dominican Republic	
Heptathlon	100m H (wind) / High jump / Shot put / 200m (wind) / Long jump (wind) / Javelin / 800m; 15.12 / 1.61 m / 10.14 m / 24.44 / 5.16 m / 30.62 m / 2:17.66					
20,000 m walk (track)	1:54:08.9	Gisel Rodriguez	13 June 2015		Lima, Peru	
20 km walk (road)	1:50:55	Francisca Ferris	26 March 2011	Pan Am Racewalking Cup	Envigado, Colombia	
4 × 100 m relay	46.66	Panama; Silvia Hunte; Carlota Gooden; Lorraine Dunn; Jean Holmes-Mitchell	7 September 1960	Olympic Games	Rome, Italy	
4 × 100 m relay	46.66	Panama; Kashani Ríos; Aranda Nathsalee; Gabriela Guevara; Ruth-Cassandra Hunt	11 March 2013	Central American Games	San José, Costa Rica	
4 × 400 m relay	3:49.75	Panama; Ivette Sánchez; Z. Ruiz; Velveth Moreno; Rita Alcazar	13 December 1997		San Pedro Sula, Honduras	

== Indoor ==
=== Men ===
Event	Record	Athlete	Date	Meet	Place	Ref.
55 m	6.39	Mateo Edward	1 March 2013	NJCAA Championships	Lubbock, United States	
60 m	6.73	Mateo Edward	14 February 2014	Southern Miss Cupid Classic	Birmingham, United States	
60 m	6.70	Virjilio Griggs	11 January 2020	FasTrak Collegiate Invite	Houston, United States	
200 m	20.70	Alonso Edward	13 February 2010	Tyson Invitational	Fayetteville, United States	
200 m	20.69 OT	Alonso Edward	7 March 2009		Lubbock, United States	
400 m	46.26	Bayano Kamani	29 January 2005		Boston, United States	
800 m						
1500 m	3:51.4	Donaldo Arza	13 February 1971		Böblingen, West Germany	
Mile	4:08.54	Donson Cook-Gallardo	11 March 2017	NCAA Division III Championships	Naperville, United States	
3000 m	8:37.13	Kyle Merritt	8 February 2014	Bronco Invite	Boise, United States	
3000 m	8:32.44	Donson Cook-Gallardo	3 February 2018	Carleton Meet of the Hearts	Northfield, United States	
60 m hurdles	7.79	Curt Young	31 January 1997		Houston, United States	
High jump	2.18 m	Alexander Bowen Jr.	1 March 2015	BU Last Chance Meet	Boston, United States	
Pole vault	4.50 m	Antonio Morales	11 December 1999		Annapolis, United States	
Long jump	8.42 m	Irving Saladino	13 February 2008		Paiania, Greece	
Triple jump	15.15 m	Michael Thompson	17 January 2009	Bison Classic	Fargo, United States	
Shot put						
Heptathlon						
Heptathlon	60m / Long jump / Shot put / High jump / 60m H / Pole vault / 1000m					
5000 m walk						
4 × 400 m relay						

=== Women ===
Event	Record	Athlete	Date	Meet	Place	Ref.
60 m	7.40	Selena Arjona	12 February 2022	7th Annual Gorilla Classic	Pittsburg, United States	
200 m	23.68	Cristal Cuervo	26 February 2025	CAA Championships	Virginia Beach, United States	
400 m	57.62	Kaila Smith	25 January 2014		Blacksburg, United States	
800 m	2:23.65	Kaila Smith	26 February 2015		Birmingham, United States	
800 m	2:22.21 OT	Kaila Smith	23 January 2015		Nashville, United States	
1500 m	4:21.51+	Rolanda Bell	21 January 2017	New Balance Games	New York City, United States	
Mile	4:38.86	Rolanda Bell	21 January 2017	New Balance Games	New York City, United States	
3000 m	9:09.10	Rolanda Bell	4 February 2017	Armory Track Invitational	New York City, United States	
60 m hurdles	7.91	Yvette Lewis	7 March 2014	World Championships	Sopot, Poland	
High jump	1.56 m	Kaila Smith	4 December 2014		Nashville, United States	
Pole vault						
Long jump	6.58 m A	Nathalee Aranda	1 February 2020	South American Championships	Cochabamba, Bolivia	
Triple jump	12.30 m	Jen Clayton	1 March 2014	The American Championships	New York City, United States	
Shot put	8.59 m	Kaila Smith	23 January 2015		Nashville, United States	
Pentathlon						
Pentathlon	60m H / High jump / Shot put / Long jump / 800m					
3000 m walk						
4 × 400 m relay						
