= Panama at the 1928 Summer Olympics =

- IOC code: PAN
- NOC: Comité Olímpico de Panamá

in Amsterdam
- Competitors: 1 in 1 sport
- Medals: Gold 0 Silver 0 Bronze 0 Total 0

Summer Olympics appearances (overview)
- 1928; 1932–1936; 1948; 1952; 1956; 1960; 1964; 1968; 1972; 1976; 1980; 1984; 1988; 1992; 1996; 2000; 2004; 2008; 2012; 2016; 2020; 2024

Panama competed in the Summer Olympic Games for the first time at the 1928 Summer Olympics in Amsterdam, Netherlands. One male competitor took part in two events in one sport.

== Swimming ==
Men

| Athlete | Event | Heat | | Semifinal | | Final | |
| Athlete | Event | Time | Rank | Time | Rank | Time | Rank |
|---|---|---|---|---|---|---|---|
| Adán Gordón | 100 metre freestyle | 1:10.8 | 30 | Did not advance | | | |
| Adán Gordón | 400 metre freestyle | NT | 25 | Did not advance | | | |
