= Panama at the 1964 Summer Olympics =

- IOC code: PAN
- NOC: Comité Olímpico de Panamá

in Tokyo
- Competitors: 13 in 6 sports
- Flag bearer: Lorraine Dunn
- Medals: Gold 0 Silver 0 Bronze 0 Total 0

Summer Olympics appearances (overview)
- 1928; 1932–1936; 1948; 1952; 1956; 1960; 1964; 1968; 1972; 1976; 1980; 1984; 1988; 1992; 1996; 2000; 2004; 2008; 2012; 2016; 2020; 2024

Panama competed at the 1964 Summer Olympics in Tokyo, Japan. This was the nation's fifth appearance at the Olympics since its debut in 1928. 10 out of the 13 Panamanian athletes started in their events.

== Athletics ==
=== Women's 100 metres ===
Athlete	Time (R1)	Place (R1)	Place
Marcella Daniel	12.6s	6th (h2)	>8
Delceita Oakley	12.3s	7th (h4)	>8
Jean Mitchell	DNS	N/A (h1)	N/A

=== Women's 200 metres ===
Athlete	Time (R1)	Place (R1)	Place
Marcella Daniel	26.6s	7 (h4)	>8
Delceita Oakley	26.2s	6 (h6)	>8
Jean Mitchell	DNS	N/A(h3)	N/A

=== Women's 80 metres hurdles ===
Athlete	Time (R1)	Place (R1)	Place
Lorraine Dunn	11.5s	5 (h1)	>8

=== Women's 4 x 100 metres relay ===
Time (R1)	Place (R1)	Place
47.6s	6th (h1)	>8
Team	Delceita Oakley • Lorraine Dunn • Jean Mitchell • Marcella Daniel • Josefina Sobers (DNS)	

== Boxing ==
Event	Athlete	Place
Men's Featherweight	Alfonso Frazer	17(Tied)

== Fencing ==
Event	Athlete	Score	Place
Épée (Individual Men)	Saul Torres	DNS	N/A

== Judo ==
Event	Athlete	Place
Men's Lightweight	Aurelio Chu Yi	9(Tied)

== Weightlifting ==
Event	Athlete	K	Place
Men's Featherweight	Idelfonso Lee	340.0	9th

== Wrestling ==
Panama sent 3 wrestlers to compete in the 1964 Tokyo Games, none medaled.

- Eduardo Campbell (Flyweight Men)
- Alfonso González (Middleweight Men)
- Sión Cóhen (Light-Heavyweight Men)
