= Hadia Bentaleb =

Algerian fencer

Personal information
- Nationality: Algeria
- Born: 31 August 1980 (age 45)
- Height: 1.67 m (5 ft 5 1/2 in)
- Weight: 52 kg (115 lb)

Sport
- Sport: Fencing
- Event: Épée

Hadia Bentaleb (Arabic: هادية بن طالب; born 31 August 1980) is an Algerian épée fencer. Bentaleb represented Algeria at the 2008 Summer Olympics in Beijing, where she competed in the women's individual épée event. She lost the preliminary round of thirty-two match to Hungary's Emese Szász, with a score of 4–15.
