= Heilwig Jacob =

German sprinter

Personal information
- Nationality: German
- Born: 4 July 1942 (age 83) Sorau, Germany

Sport
- Sport: Sprinting
- Event: 100 metres

Heilwig Jacob (born 4 July 1942) is a German sprinter. She competed in the women's 100 metres at the 1964 Summer Olympics.In 1963, Heilwig Jacob set a world record in the 50 meters indoors. She later won East German indoor titles over 50 meters in 1964 and 1965, and claimed the outdoor 100-meter title in 1964.
