= Panama at the 1992 Summer Paralympics =

- IPC code: PAN
- NPC: Paralympic Committee of Panama

in Barcelona
- Competitors: 2
- Medals Ranked 42nd: Gold 1 Silver 2 Bronze 0 Total 3

Summer Paralympics appearances (overview)
- 1992; 1996; 2000; 2004; 2008; 2012; 2016; 2020; 2024

Panama competed at the 1992 Summer Paralympics in Barcelona, Spain. 2 competitors from Panama won 3 medals, 1 gold and 2 silver, and so finished joint 38th in the medal table with Bulgaria.

== See also ==
- Panama at the Paralympics
- Panama at the 1992 Summer Olympics
