= Panama at the Paralympics =

- IPC code: PAN
- NPC: Paralympic Committee of Panama
- Medals: Gold 3 Silver 4 Bronze 1 Total 8

Summer appearances
- 1992; 1996; 2000; 2004; 2008; 2012; 2016; 2020; 2024

Panama made its Paralympic Games début at the 1992 Summer Paralympics in Barcelona, with a delegation of two competitors in athletics. It has participated in every subsequent edition of the Summer Paralympics, but never in the Winter Paralympics. Panamanian delegations have always been small, never consisting in more than two competitors.

Nonetheless, Panama has won eight Paralympic medals: three gold, four silver, and one bronze. All of Panama's medals have been won by a single athlete, visually impaired runner (T13 classification) Said Gomez, over the span of four Games, from 1992 to 2004. In 1992, 1996 and 2000, Gomez medalled in all the events he entered. In 2004, he entered two races, winning silver in the 5,000m, but finishing 'only' fifth in the 10,000m. In 2008, for the first time, he failed to win any medal, being eliminated in the heats in both the 1,500m and the 5,000m races. In 2012 he was eliminated in the heats in both the 800m and 1500m races.

Only three other people have represented Panama at the Paralympics. Runner Ernesto Archer was eliminated in the heats of both his races in 1992, and did not compete again. Désirée Aguilar competed in freestyle swimming in 2004 and 2008, but did not advance past the heats. Katherina Taylor competed in athletics in 2012, and was eliminated in the heats of both her 200m and 400m races.

== Medal tallies ==
=== Summer Paralympics ===
Event	Gold	Silver	Bronze	Total	Ranking
1992 Summer Paralympics	1	2	0	3	42th
1996 Summer Paralympics	2	0	0	2	42nd
2000 Summer Paralympics	0	1	1	2	58th
2004 Summer Paralympics	0	1	0	1	66th
2008 Summer Paralympics	0	0	0	0	-
2012 Summer Paralympics	0	0	0	0	—
2016 Summer Paralympics	0	0	0	0	—
2020 Summer Paralympics	0	0	0	0	—
2024 Summer Paralympics	0	0	0	0	—
Total	3	4	1	8	87

== List of medallists ==
Medal	Name	Games	Sport	Event
Gold	Said Gomez	1992 Barcelona	Athletics	Men's 5,000 m B3
Gold	Said Gomez	1996 Atlanta	Athletics	Men's 1,500 m T12
Gold	Said Gomez	1996 Atlanta	Athletics	Men's 5,000 m T12
Silver	Said Gomez	1992 Barcelona	Athletics	Men's 1,500 m B3
Silver	Said Gomez	1992 Barcelona	Athletics	Men's 800 m B3
Silver	Said Gomez	2000 Sydney	Athletics	Men's 5,000 m T13
Silver	Said Gomez	2004 Athens	Athletics	Men's 5,000 m T13
Bronze	Said Gomez	2000 Sydney	Athletics	Men's 1,500 m T13

== See also ==
- Panama at the Olympics
