= Panama at the 1992 Summer Olympics =

- IOC code: PAN
- NOC: Comité Olímpico de Panamá

in Barcelona
- Competitors: 5 in 4 sports
- Medals: Gold 0 Silver 0 Bronze 0 Total 0

Summer Olympics appearances (overview)
- 1928; 1932–1936; 1948; 1952; 1956; 1960; 1964; 1968; 1972; 1976; 1980; 1984; 1988; 1992; 1996; 2000; 2004; 2008; 2012; 2016; 2020; 2024

Panama competed at the 1992 Summer Olympics in Barcelona, Spain.

== Competitors ==
The following is the list of number of competitors in the Games.

Sport	Men	Women	Total
Athletics	1	0	1
Swimming	1	0	1
Weightlifting	1	–	1
Wrestling	2	–	2
Total	5	0	5

== Results by event ==
=== Athletics ===
Men's 100m metres

- Florencio Aguilar

- Heat — 10.89 (→ did not advance)

=== Swimming ===
Men's 100m Breaststroke

- Rafael Torres Arguelles

- Heat – 1:06.05 (→ did not advance, 41st place)

Men's 200m Breaststroke

- Rafael Torres Arguelles

- Heat – 2:21.93 (→ did not advance, 34th place)

Men's 200m Individual Medley

- Rafael Torres Arguelles

- Heat – 2:12.01 (→ did not advance, 41st place)

== See also ==
- Panama at the 1991 Pan American Games
