= Clarice Ahanotu =

Nigerian sprinter

Personal information
- Nationality: Nigerian
- Born: 27 July 1939 (age 86)

Sport
- Sport: Sprinting
- Event: 100 metres

Clarice Ahanotu (born 27 July 1939) is a Nigerian sprinter. She competed in the women's 100 metres at the 1964 Summer Olympics.
