= Christiane Cadic =

French sprinter

Personal information
- Nationality: French
- Born: 8 January 1947 (age 78)

Sport
- Sport: Sprinting
- Event: 100 metres

Christiane Cadic (born 8 January 1947) is a French sprinter. She competed in the women's 100 metres at the 1964 Summer Olympics.
