= Panama at the 1996 Summer Olympics =

- IOC code: PAN
- NOC: Comité Olímpico de Panamá
- Website: www.copanama.com (in Spanish)

in Atlanta
- Competitors: 7 in 6 sports
- Flag bearer: Eileen Coparropa
- Medals: Gold 0 Silver 0 Bronze 0 Total 0

Summer Olympics appearances (overview)
- 1928; 1932–1936; 1948; 1952; 1956; 1960; 1964; 1968; 1972; 1976; 1980; 1984; 1988; 1992; 1996; 2000; 2004; 2008; 2012; 2016; 2020; 2024

Panama competed at the 1996 Summer Olympics, held in Atlanta, United States.

== Competitors ==
The following is the list of number of competitors in the Games.

Sport	Men	Women	Total
Athletics	1	0	1
Canoeing	1	0	1
Shooting	0	1	1
Swimming	1	1	1
Weightlifting	1	–	1
Wrestling	1	–	1
Total	5	2	7

== Athletics ==
Men
Track and road events

Athlete	Event	Heats		Quarterfinal		Semifinal		Final	
Athlete	Event	Result	Rank	Result	Rank	Result	Rank	Result	Rank
Curt Young	400 metres hurdles	55.20	54	—N/a		Did not advance			

== Canoeing ==
=== Slalom ===
Athlete	Event	Run 1	Rank	Run 2	Rank	Best	Rank
Scott Muller	Men's K-1	242.24	40	242.89	42	242.24	44

== Shooting ==
Women

Athlete	Event	Qualification		Final	
Athlete	Event	Points	Rank	Points	Rank
Jenny Schuverer	10 m air pistol	354	41	Did not advance	

== Swimming ==
Men

Athlete	Event	Heats		Final A/B	
Athlete	Event	Time	Rank	Time	Rank
José Isaza	100 m freestyle	51.86	43	Did not advance	
José Isaza	200 m freestyle	1:54.58	32	Did not advance	
José Isaza	100 m butterfly	57.62	55	Did not advance	

Women

Athlete	Event	Heats		Final A/B	
Athlete	Event	Time	Rank	Time	Rank
Eileen Coparropa	50 m freestyle	26.67	33	Did not advance	

== Weightlifting ==
Athlete	Event	Snatch		Clean & jerk		Total	Rank
Athlete	Event	Result	Rank	Result	Rank	Total	Rank
Alexi Batista	–64 kg	122.5	24	150.0	27	272.5	27

== Wrestling ==
Freestyle

Athlete	Event	Round of 32	Round of 16	Quarterfinals	Semifinals	Repechage					Final	
Athlete	Event	Round of 32	Round of 16	Quarterfinals	Semifinals	Round 1	Round 2	Round 3	Round 4	Round 5	Final	
Athlete	Event	Opposition Result	Opposition Result	Opposition Result	Opposition Result	Opposition Result	Opposition Result	Opposition Result	Opposition Result	Opposition Result	Opposition Result	Rank
Alfredo Far	–130 kg	Feng (CHN); L 0–11	Did not advance			Kovalevsky (KGZ); L Fall	Did not advance					

== See also ==
- Panama at the 1995 Pan American Games
