= Panama at the 2004 Summer Paralympics =

- IPC code: PAN
- NPC: Paralympic Committee of Panama

in Athens
- Competitors: 2 in 2 sports
- Flag bearer: Said Gomez
- Medals Ranked 66th: Gold 0 Silver 1 Bronze 0 Total 1

Summer Paralympics appearances (overview)
- 1992; 1996; 2000; 2004; 2008; 2012; 2016; 2020; 2024

Panama competed at the 2004 Summer Paralympics in Athens, Greece. The team included two athletes, one man and one woman. Said Gomez won the nation's only medal at the Games, a silver in the men's 5000 metres T13 track event.

== Medallists ==
Medal	Name	Sport	Event
Silver	Said Gomez	Athletics	Men's 5000m T13

== Sports ==
=== Athletics ===
==== Men's track ====
Athlete	Class	Event	Heats		Semifinal		Final	
Athlete	Class	Event	Result	Rank	Result	Rank	Result	Rank
Said Gomez	T13	5000m	—				15:23.90	2nd place, silver medalist(s)
Said Gomez	T13	10000m	—				32:28.96	5

== See also ==
- Panama at the Paralympics
- Panama at the 2004 Summer Olympics
