= Panama at the 2012 Summer Olympics =

- IOC code: PAN
- NOC: Comité Olímpico de Panamá
- Website: www.copanama.com (in Spanish)

in London
- Competitors: 8 in 5 sports
- Flag bearers: Irving Saladino (opening); Omar Simmonds (closing)
- Medals: Gold 0 Silver 0 Bronze 0 Total 0

Summer Olympics appearances (overview)
- 1928; 1932–1936; 1948; 1952; 1956; 1960; 1964; 1968; 1972; 1976; 1980; 1984; 1988; 1992; 1996; 2000; 2004; 2008; 2012; 2016; 2020; 2024; 2028

Panama competed at the 2012 Summer Olympics in London, from 27 July to 12 August 2012. This was the nation's sixteenth appearance at the Olympics since its debut in 1928. Panama did not compete on four occasions, including the 1980 Summer Olympics in Moscow, because of its partial support of the United States boycott.

Comité Olímpico de Panamá sent 8 athletes, 6 men and 2 women, to compete in 5 sports, tying its record with Montreal in 1976, and with Los Angeles in 1984. Two of their athletes competed at their second consecutive Olympics, including breaststroke swimmer Édgar Crespo. Long jumper Irving Saladino, who won Panama's first ever Olympic gold medal in Beijing, became the nation's first male flag bearer at the opening ceremony since 1992.

== Athletics ==
Panamanian athletes have so far achieved qualifying standards in the following athletics events (up to a maximum of 3 athletes in each event at the 'A' Standard, and 1 at the 'B' Standard):

Key

- Note – Ranks given for track events are within the athlete's heat only
- Q = Qualified for the next round
- q = Qualified for the next round as a fastest loser or, in field events, by position without achieving the qualifying target
- NR = National record
- N/A = Round not applicable for the event
- Bye = Athlete not required to compete in round

Men
Track & road events

Athlete	Event	Heat		Semifinal		Final	
Athlete	Event	Result	Rank	Result	Rank	Result	Rank
Alonso Edward	200 m	DSQ		Did not advance			

Field events

Athlete	Event	Qualification		Final	
Athlete	Event	Distance	Position	Distance	Position
Irving Saladino	Long jump	NM	—	Did not advance	

Women
Track & road events

Athlete	Event	Heat		Semifinal		Final	
Athlete	Event	Result	Rank	Result	Rank	Result	Rank
Andrea Ferris	800 m	2:05.59	5	Did not advance			

== Boxing ==
Men

Athlete	Event	Round of 32	Round of 16	Quarterfinals	Semifinals	Final	
Athlete	Event	Opposition Result	Opposition Result	Opposition Result	Opposition Result	Opposition Result	Rank
Juan Huertas	Lightweight	Verdejo (PUR); L 5–11	Did not advance				

== Judo ==
Panama has qualified 1 judoka.

Athlete	Event	Round of 64	Round of 32	Round of 16	Quarterfinals	Semifinals	Repechage	Final / BM	
Athlete	Event	Opposition Result	Opposition Result	Opposition Result	Opposition Result	Opposition Result	Opposition Result	Opposition Result	Rank
Omar Simmonds Pea	Men's −81 kg	Bye	Bottieau (BEL); L 0001–1100	Did not advance					

== Swimming ==
Panamanian swimmers have so far achieved qualifying standards in the following events (up to a maximum of 2 swimmers in each event at the Olympic Qualifying Time (OQT), and potentially 1 at the Olympic Selection Time (OST)): Panama also has gained a "Universality place" from the FINA.

Men

Athlete	Event	Heat		Semifinal		Final	
Athlete	Event	Time	Rank	Time	Rank	Time	Rank
Diego Castillo	200 m butterfly	2:04.72	35	Did not advance			
Édgar Crespo	100 m breaststroke	1:02.18	35	Did not advance			

== Taekwondo ==
Panama was given a wild card entrant.

Athlete	Event	Round of 16	Quarterfinals	Semifinals	Repechage	Bronze Medal	Final	
Athlete	Event	Opposition Result	Opposition Result	Opposition Result	Opposition Result	Opposition Result	Opposition Result	Rank
Carolena Carstens	Women's −49 kg	Yagüe (ESP); L 2–7	Did not advance		Alegría (MEX); L 2–7	Did not advance		

== See also ==
- Panama at the 2011 Pan American Games
