= Panama at the 1952 Summer Olympics =

- IOC code: PAN
- NOC: Comité Olímpico de Panamá

in Helsinki
- Medals: Gold 0 Silver 0 Bronze 0 Total 0

Summer Olympics appearances (overview)
- 1928; 1932–1936; 1948; 1952; 1956; 1960; 1964; 1968; 1972; 1976; 1980; 1984; 1988; 1992; 1996; 2000; 2004; 2008; 2012; 2016; 2020; 2024

Panama competed at the 1952 Summer Olympics in Helsinki, Finland. It was the nations third time competing in the Olympics since 1928.
