= Delceita Oakley =

Panamanian sprinter (1944–2019)

Personal information
- Nationality: Panamanian
- Born: Delceita Lucía Oakley; 22 April 1944
- Died: 28 June 2019 (aged 75)
- Height: 1.60 m (5 ft 3 in)
- Weight: 52 kg (115 lb)

Sport
- Sport: Sprinting
- Event: 100 metres

Delceita Lucía Oakley (later Daniel; 22 April 1944 – 17 June 2019) was a Panamanian sprinter. She competed in the women's 100 metres at the 1964 Summer Olympics.

== International competitions ==
Year	Competition	Venue	Position	Event	Notes
Representing Panama
1962	Central American and Caribbean Games	Kingston, Jamaica	7th (sf)	100 m	12.4
1962	Central American and Caribbean Games	Kingston, Jamaica	3rd	4 × 100 m relay	47.7
1964	Olympic Games	Tokyo, Japan	38th (h)	100 m	12.3
1964	Olympic Games	Tokyo, Japan	31st (h)	200 m	26.2
1964	Olympic Games	Tokyo, Japan	12th (h)	4 × 100 m relay	47.6

== Personal bests ==
- 100 metres – 11.6h (1964)
- 200 metres – 24.2h (1964)
