= Ricardo Torres Balaguer =

Spanish politician and deputy

Ricardo Torres Balaguer (Llíria, Valencia Province, 13 February 1955) is a Spanish politician and former deputy who belongs to the governing Spanish Socialist Workers' Party (PSOE).

After qualifying in law and economic science, Torres served as Mayor of his hometown of Llíria from 1991 to 1995. In 2004 he was elected to the Congress of Deputies as a deputy for Valencia region and served as Economic and Manufacturing spokesman for the PSOE group. During his time as deputy he was criticised for possible conflict of interest. He did not stand at the 2008 election.
