= Iveth Valdés Romero =

Panamanian Paralympic athlete (born 1977)

Iveth del Rosario Valdés Romero
Personal information
- Born: 13 August 1977 (age 49)

Sport
- Country: Panama
- Sport: Para-athletics
- Disability class: F55

Iveth del Rosario Valdés Romero (born 13 August 1977) is a Panamanian para-athlete and lawyer. She is the general secretary of the Paralympic Committee of Panama, and competed for Panama in the 2016 and 2020 Summer Paralympics.

== Biography ==
Valdés was born on 13 August 1977. She competes in para-athletics in the F55 classification, a classification for athletes with spinal cord injuries. Outside of athletics, Valdés works as a lawyer, and serves as the general secretary of the Paralympic Committee of Panama.

In 2009, Valdés became paralyzed in her lower limbs after a car accident, which required her to use a wheelchair full-time. While initially not interested in sports, Valdés began playing after meeting Luis Espinoza, president of the Panamanian Wheelchair Sports Association (Spanish: Asociación Panameña de Deportes sobre Silla de Ruedas), who encouraged her to join. After initially trying wheelchair basketball, she competed in Panama's National Wheelchair Race (Spanish: Carrera Nacional Sobre Sillas de Rueda). She won first place in the women's spinal injuries category in 2016, 2017, and 2022.

In 2015, while watching athletes train for the 2015 Parapan American Games, she was encouraged to try the javelin throw by one of the coaches. Valdés, who had not practiced before, threw the javelin 12 metres (39 ft); a distance of 13 metres (43 ft) was required to qualify for the 2016 Summer Paralympics in Río de Janeiro, Brazil. From there, she was encouraged to train for the Paralympics, and after training for three months, Valdés successfully qualified for the Games at a competition in Ecuador.

Valdés competed in the women's javelin throw at the 2016 Summer Paralympics, placing 11th overall. Reflecting on her participation in a 2021 interview with Ellas, Valdés said "I felt bad because I had lost. It wasn't until some time later that I understood it wasn't like that, that I was the 11th best in the world, and that many people tried to be here."

In 2019, she competed in the 2019 Parapan American Games in Lima, Peru. She placed 7th in the women's shot put and 5th in the women's javelin throw.

She was one of Panama's two flagbearers for the 2020 Summer Paralympics in Tokyo, Japan, where she placed 8th overall in the F56 women's javelin throw. Following the Games, she, alongside the rest of the Panamanian delegation, was recognized by Panama's National Secretariat of Disability (Spanish: Secretaría Nacional de Discapacidad) for her participation in the Games.

Valdés qualified for the 2024 Summer Paralympics in Paris, France, after winning a gold medal in the 2024 Desert Challenge Games in Arizona and gold and silver medals in the 2024 World Para Athletics Grand Prix in Xalapa, Mexico. She participated in the delegation as one of Panama's two flagbearers, but suffered an infection from an injury received during training, and ultimately did not compete at the advice of a doctor.
