= Adán Gordón =

Panamanian swimmer (1906–1966)

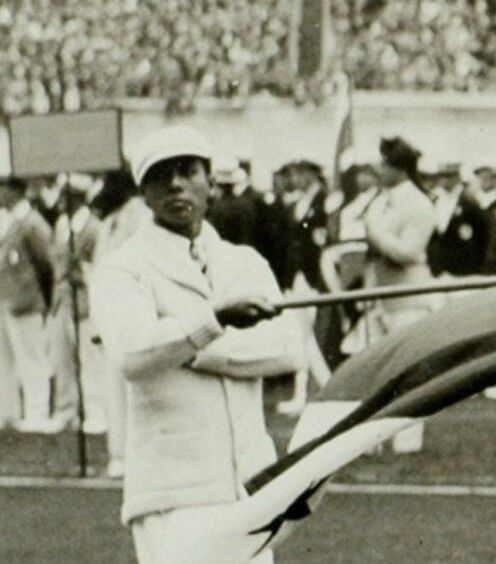
- Adán Gordón at the 1928 Summer Olympics

Personal information
- Full name: Pedro Adán Gordón Gallardo Jr.
- Nationality: Panamanian
- Born: 21 January 1906 Taboga, Panama
- Died: 8 March 1966 (aged 60) Panama City, Panama

Sport
- Sport: Swimming

Pedro Adán Gordón Gallardo Jr. (21 January 1906 – 8 March 1966) was a Panamanian swimmer. Born in Taboga, he worked as a mechanic and competed in local swimming events before representing Panama at the 1928 Summer Olympics, where he was the country's sole participant and first Olympian. After his career, he worked as a coach at a local pool and for two Panamanian delegations at the Central American and Caribbean Games.

== Early life and education ==
Pedro Adán Gordón Gallardo Jr. was born on 21 January 1906 in Taboga, Panama. For his education, he studied at the School of Arts and Crafts and worked as a mechanic, later working as a workshop instructor. During this time, he swam regularly in Taboga and participated in swimming competitions on the beaches of Bella Vista and near a waterwheel in San Felipe. He was nicknamed the "Human Fish" because of his speed in the water.

== Career and later life ==
With the creation of the Panamanian Sports Federation in the 1920s, invitations were sent out to sports clubs to compete for Panama at the 1928 Summer Olympics in Amsterdam. After not receiving an invitation, Gordón decided to fund his own participation. In Amsterdam, Gordón was the only athlete for Panama's first appearance at an Olympic Games and was also designated as the flag bearer for the nation during the opening ceremony.

Gordón first competed in the fifth preliminary heat of the men's 400 metre freestyle on 7 August. There, he placed fourth out of the five swimmers in the heat and failed to advance. He then competed in the fourth preliminary heat of the men's 100 metre freestyle three days later. There, he recorded a time of 1:10.8, placed last out of the three swimmers that competed, and failed to advance.

Gordón continued his sporting career until the 1930 Central American and Caribbean Games in Havana, where he instead served as a coach for the Panamanian swimming team. For the 1938 Central American and Caribbean Games held in Panama City, he served as a delegate, assistant coach, and an administrator of the pool used for the Games. For around three decades, he worked as an administrator and taught swimmers at the pool. He later died on 8 March 1966 in Panama City at the age of 60. After his death, the pool was renamed the Piscina Adán Gordón.
