= Julio Osorio =

Panamanian basketball player (1939–2022)

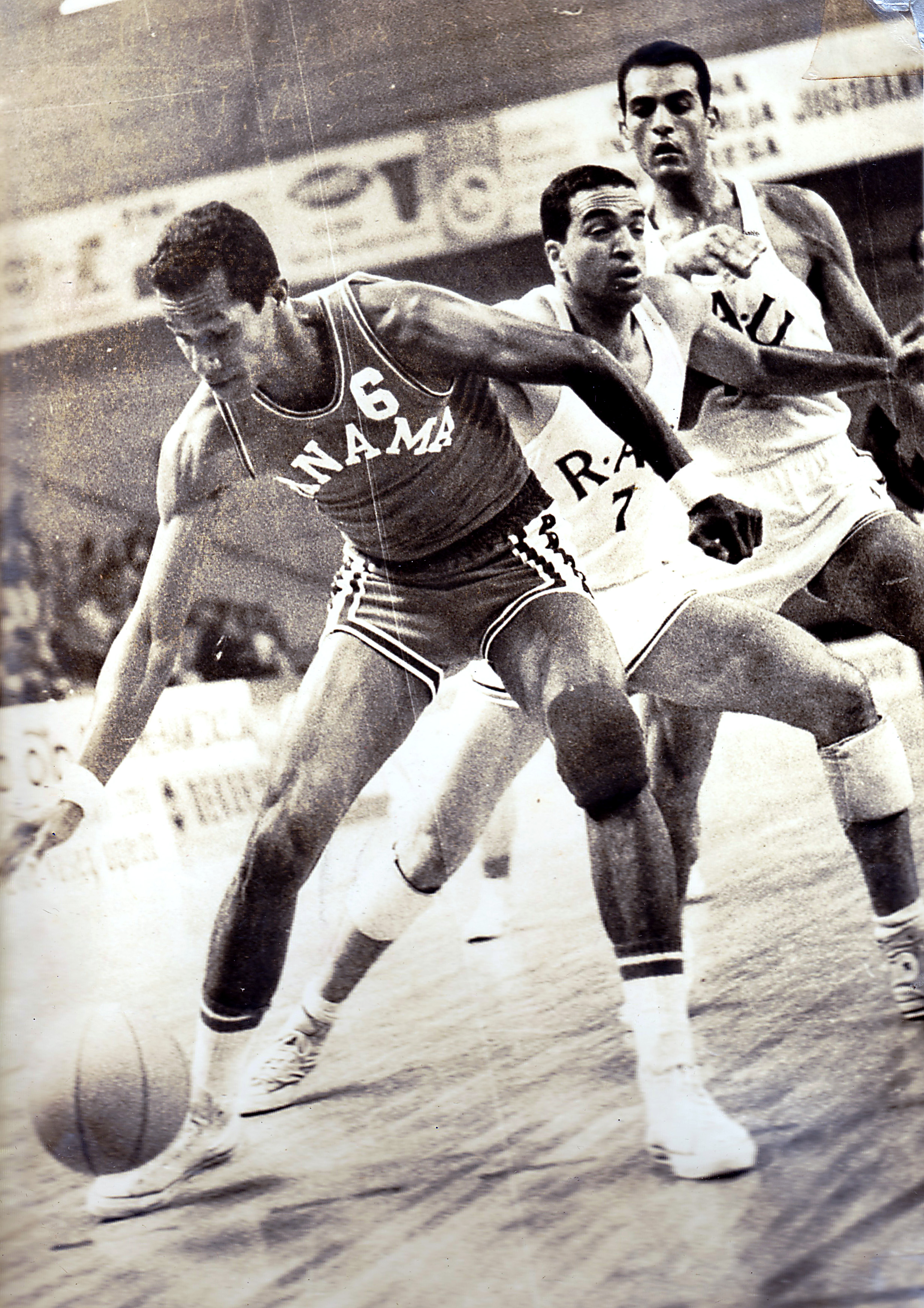

Julio Osorio (2 October 1939 – 28 September 2022) was a Panamanian basketball player who competed in the 1968 Summer Olympics. He was the flag bearer for Panama in the opening ceremony.

On 28 September 2022, Osorio died in Panama City, at the age of 82.
