= Panama at the 2024 Summer Olympics =

- IOC code: PAN
- NOC: Comité Olímpico de Panamá
- Website: www.copanama.com (in Spanish)

in Paris, France 26 July 2024 – 11 August 2024
- Competitors: 8 (3 men and 5 women) in 6 sports
- Flag bearers (opening): Franklin Archibold & Hillary Heron
- Flag bearers (closing): Arturo Deliser & Atheyna Bylon
- Medals Ranked 74th: Gold 0 Silver 1 Bronze 0 Total 1

Summer Olympics appearances (overview)
- 1928; 1932–1936; 1948; 1952; 1956; 1960; 1964; 1968; 1972; 1976; 1980; 1984; 1988; 1992; 1996; 2000; 2004; 2008; 2012; 2016; 2020; 2024

Panama competed at the 2024 Summer Olympics in Paris from 26 July to 11 August 2024. It was the nation's nineteenth appearance at the Summer Olympics, since its debut in 1928.

Panama earned it's very first silver medal won by Atheyna Bylon in the women's 75 kg category in boxing.

== Medalists ==
Medal	Name	Sport	Event	Date
(silver) Silver	Atheyna Bylon	Boxing	Women's 75 kg	10 Aug

Medals by sport
Sport	1st place, gold medalist(s)	2nd place, silver medalist(s)	3rd place, bronze medalist(s)	Total
Boxing	0	1	0	1
Total	0	1	0	1

== Competitors ==
The following is the list of number of competitors in the Games. Note that reserves in handball are not counted:

Sport	Men	Women	Total
Athletics	1	1	2
Boxing	0	1	1
Cycling	1	0	1
Gymnastics	0	1	1
Judo	0	1	1
Swimming	1	1	2
Total	3	5	8

== Athletics ==
Panamanian track and field athletes achieved the entry standards for Paris 2024, either by passing the direct qualifying mark (or time for track and road races) or by world ranking, in the following events (a maximum of 3 athletes each):

Key

- Note–Ranks given for track events are within the athlete's heat only
- Q = Qualified for the next round
- q = Qualified for the next round as a fastest loser or, in field events, by position without achieving the qualifying target
- NR = National record
- N/A = Round not applicable for the event
- Bye = Athlete not required to compete in round

Track and road events

Athlete	Event	Preliminary		Heat		Repechage		Semifinal		Final	
Athlete	Event	Result	Rank	Result	Rank	Result	Rank	Result	Rank	Result	Rank
Arturo Deliser	Men's 100 m	10.34	1 Q	10.35	7	—N/a		Did not advance			
Gianna Woodruff	Women's 400 m hurdles	—N/a		54.93	5q	55.10 (.098)	3	Did not advance			

== Boxing ==
Panama entered one boxer into the Olympic tournament. Atheyna Bylon qualified for Paris by advancing to the women's 75kg final at the 2023 Pan American Games in Santiago, Chile.

Athlete	Event	Round of 16	Quarterfinals	Semifinals	Final	
Athlete	Event	Opposition Result	Opposition Result	Opposition Result	Opposition Result	Rank
Atheyna Bylon	Women's 75 kg	Khalzova (KAZ); W 4–1	Wójcik (POL); W 3–2	Cindy Ngamba (EOR); W 4–1	Li Qian (CHN); L 1–4	2nd place, silver medalist(s)

== Cycling ==
=== Road ===
Panama entered one male rider to compete in the men's road race events at the Olympics, after securing the quota through the UCI Nation Ranking.

Athlete	Event	Time	Rank
Franklin Archibold	Men's road race	6:39:27	67

== Gymnastics ==
=== Artistic ===
For the first time since 2016, Panama entered one female gymnast into the games. Hillary Heron qualified for the games by virtue of her individual results, through all-around event at the 2023 World Artistic Gymnastics Championships in Antwerp, Belgium.

Women

Athlete	Event	Qualification						Final					
Athlete	Event	Apparatus				Total	Rank	Apparatus				Total	Rank
Athlete	Event	V	UB	BB	F	Total	Rank	V	UB	BB	F	Total	Rank
Hillary Heron	All-around	13.650	11.766	12.166	13.033	50.765	44	Did not advance					

== Judo ==
Panama qualified one judoka for the following weight class at the Games. Kristine Jiménez (women's lightweight, 57 kg) qualified via continental quota based on Olympic point rankings.

Athlete	Event	Round of 32	Round of 16	Quarterfinals	Semifinals	Repechage	Final / BM	
Athlete	Event	Opposition Result	Opposition Result	Opposition Result	Opposition Result	Opposition Result	Opposition Result	Rank
Kristine Jiménez	Women's –57 kg	Dahouk (EOR); W 10–00	Deguchi (CAN); L 00–10	Did not advance				

== Swimming ==
Panama sent two swimmers to compete at the 2024 Paris Olympics.

Athlete	Event	Heat		Semifinal		Final	
Athlete	Event	Time	Rank	Time	Rank	Time	Rank
Tyler Christianson	Men's 200 m breaststroke	2:15.62	22	Did not advance			
Emily Santos	Women's 100 m breaststroke	1:09.94	30	Did not advance			

== See also ==
- Panama at the 2023 Pan American Games
