= Panama at the 2020 Summer Paralympics =

- IPC code: PAN
- NPC: Paralympic Committee of Panama

in Tokyo, Japan 24 August 2021 – 5 September 2021
- Competitors: 3 (2 men and 1 woman) in 1 sport
- Flag bearers: Iveth Valdés Romero; Jhan Carlos Wisdom Lungrin
- Medals: Gold 0 Silver 0 Bronze 0 Total 0

Summer Paralympics appearances (overview)
- 1992; 1996; 2000; 2004; 2008; 2012; 2016; 2020; 2024

Panama competed at the 2020 Summer Paralympics in Tokyo, Japan, from 24 August to 5 September 2021.

Panama's flagbearers were Iveth Valdés Romero and Jhan Carlos Wisdom Lungrin. They received the Panamanian flag to be used during the Games from then-President Laurentino Cortizo on August 16, 2021.

Upon their return to Panama, all three athletes were recognized by Panama's National Secretariat of Disability (Spanish: Secretaría Nacional de Discapacidad) for their participation in the Games. Previously that year, The National Secretariat of Disability contributed 30,000 balboas (equivalent to USD$30,000) to the Paralympic Committee of Panama, the first time the Paralympic Committee had received such a donation.

== Competitors ==
Three athletes from Panama competed at the Paralympics.

Sport	Men	Women	Total
Athletics	1	1	2
Powerlifting	1	0	1
Total	2	1	3

== Athletics ==
Iveth Valdés Romero competed in the women's javelin throw. She competed in the F55 class, a classification for athletes who have spinal cord injuries. Valdés became paralyzed in her lower limbs after a car accident in 2009, which required her to use a wheelchair full-time as a result.

Athlete	Event	Score						Best	Ranking
Athlete	Event	1	2	3	4	5	6	Best	Ranking
Iveth Valdés Romero	Women's javelin throw F55	13.24	14.40	X	13.25	X	X	14.40 SB	8th

Jhan Carlos Wisdom Lungrin competed in the men's 400 metres under the T20 classification, a classification for athletes with intellectual disabilities.

Athlete	Event	Heat		Final	
Athlete	Event	Result	Rank	Result	Rank
Jhan Carlos Wisdom Lungrin	Men's 400 metres T20	50.21 SB	10	Did not advance	

== Powerlifting ==
Rey Melchor Dimas Vasquez competed in powerlifting, the first time athletes from Panama had competed in the sport at the Paralympics.

Athlete	Event	Attempt				Best	Ranking
Athlete	Event	1	2	3	4	Best	Ranking
Rey Melchor Dimas Vasquez	Men's 72 kg	165	169	~~180~~	—	169	5th
