= Panama at the Olympics =

- IOC code: PAN
- NOC: Comité Olímpico de Panamá
- Website: www.copanama.com (in Spanish)
- Medals Ranked 107th: Gold 1 Silver 1 Bronze 2 Total 4

Summer appearances
- 1928; 1932–1936; 1948; 1952; 1956; 1960; 1964; 1968; 1972; 1976; 1980; 1984; 1988; 1992; 1996; 2000; 2004; 2008; 2012; 2016; 2020; 2024; 2028

Panama has appeared in 19 Summer Olympic Games since its debut in 1928, but has never competed in the Winter Olympic Games. The nation has won four medals (one gold, one silver, and two bronze medals). Long jumper Irving Saladino won Panama's first and only Olympic gold medal at the 2008 Summer Games.

== Medal tables ==
=== Medals by Summer Games ===
Games	Athletes	Gold	Silver	Bronze	Total	Rank
(Netherlands) 1928 Amsterdam	1	0	0	0	0	–
(United States) 1932 Los Angeles	did not participate					
(Nazi Germany) 1936 Berlin	did not participate					
(United Kingdom) 1948 London	1	0	0	2	2	32
(Finland) 1952 Helsinki	1	0	0	0	0	–
(Australia) 1956 Melbourne	did not participate					
(Italy) 1960 Rome	6	0	0	0	0	–
(Japan) 1964 Tokyo	10	0	0	0	0	–
1968 Mexico City	16	0	0	0	0	–
(West Germany) 1972 Munich	7	0	0	0	0	–
(Canada) 1976 Montreal	8	0	0	0	0	–
(Soviet Union) 1980 Moscow	boycotted					
(United States) 1984 Los Angeles	8	0	0	0	0	–
(South Korea) 1988 Seoul	6	0	0	0	0	–
(Spain) 1992 Barcelona	5	0	0	0	0	–
(United States) 1996 Atlanta	7	0	0	0	0	–
(Australia) 2000 Sydney	6	0	0	0	0	–
(Greece) 2004 Athens	4	0	0	0	0	–
(China) 2008 Beijing	5	1	0	0	1	52
(United Kingdom) 2012 London	8	0	0	0	0	–
(Brazil) 2016 Rio de Janeiro	10	0	0	0	0	–
(Japan) 2020 Tokyo	10	0	0	0	0	–
(France) 2024 Paris	8	0	1	0	1	74
(United States) 2028 Los Angeles	future event					
(Australia) 2032 Brisbane	future event					
Total		1	1	2	4	107

=== Medals by summer sport ===
Sports	Gold	Silver	Bronze	Total	Rank
Athletics	1	0	2	3	69
Boxing	0	1	0	1	61
Total	1	1	2	4	107

== List of medalists ==
Medal	Name	Games	Sport	Event
Bronze	Lloyd LaBeach	(United Kingdom) 1948 London	Athletics	Men's 100 metres
Bronze	Lloyd LaBeach	(United Kingdom) 1948 London	Athletics	Men's 200 metres
Gold	Irving Saladino	(China) 2008 Beijing	Athletics	Men's long jump
Silver	Atheyna Bylon	(France) 2024 Paris	Boxing	Women's 75 kg

== See also ==
- List of flag bearers for Panama at the Olympics
- Panama at the Paralympics
