= Iván Rodríguez Mesa =

Panamanian swimmer (born 1977)

Iván Rodríguez
Personal information
- Full name: Iván Rodríguez Mesa
- National team: Panama
- Born: 22 January 1977 (age 49) Panama City, Panama
- Height: 1.89 m (6 ft 2 in)
- Weight: 68 kg (150 lb)

Sport
- Sport: Swimming
- Strokes: Breaststroke
- College team: Arizona State University (U.S.)
- Coach: Mike Chasson (U.S.)

Iván Rodríguez Mesa (born January 22, 1977) is a Panamanian former swimmer, who specialized in breaststroke events. He is a single-time Olympian (2000) and a member of the Arizona State Sun Devils swimming and diving team under head coach Mike Chasson.

Rodriguez competed only in the men's 100 m breaststroke at the 2000 Summer Olympics in Sydney. He achieved a FINA B-standard entry time of 1:04.52 from the Pan American Games in Winnipeg, Manitoba, Canada. He challenged seven other swimmers in heat five, including Israel's top favorite Tal Stricker and Chinese Taipei's 16-year-old Yang Shang-hsuan. He raced to sixth place in a time of 1:04.68, trailing Mexico's Alfredo Jacobo by a hundredth of a second (0.01). Rodriguez failed to advance into the semifinals, as he placed forty-fourth overall on the first day of prelims.
