= Segundo Olmedo =

Panamanian wrestler (born 1948)

Segundo Olmedo (20 April 1948 – 11 April 2024) was a Panamanian wrestler who competed in the 1972 Summer Olympics and in the 1976 Summer Olympics. At the 1975 Pan American Games he finished third in the 74 kg Greco-Roman category and placed sixth in the 68 kg freestyle category. At the 1979 Pan American Games he finished fifth in the 68 kg freestyle category.
