= Ricardo Torres (swimmer) =

Panamanian swimmer (born 1967)

Personal information
- Born: 5 January 1967 (age 59)

Sport
- Sport: Swimming

Ricardo Torres (born 5 January 1967) is a Panamanian swimmer. He competed in three events at the 1992 Summer Olympics.
