= Manuel Gutiérrez (swimmer) =

Panamanian swimmer (born 1964)

Personal information
- Born: 10 December 1964 (age 61)

Sport
- Sport: Swimming

Manuel Gutiérrez (born 10 December 1964) is a Panamanian swimmer. He competed at the 1984 and the 1988 Summer Olympics. Gutiérrez was the flag bearer for Panama in the Seoul 1988 opening ceremony.
