= Jesika Jiménez =

Panamanian fencer (born 1980)

Personal information
- Full name: Jesika Jacqueline Jiménez Luna
- Born: 8 June 1980 (age 46) Panama City, Panama
- Height: 1.75 m (5 ft 9 in)
- Weight: 55 kg (121 lb)

Sport
- Country: Panama
- Sport: Fencing
- Event: Épée
Medal record
Representing Panama
Pan American Games
Bronze medal – third place	2003 Santo Domingo	Individual épée

Jesika Jacqueline Jiménez Luna (born June 8, 1980) is a Panamanian fencer. She competed in the individual épée event at the 2008 Summer Olympics, and was also the nation's flag bearer at the opening ceremony. She earned her first victory against Yana Shemyakina (Ukraine) in the first round, but was eliminated in the subsequent round after losing to Imke Duplitzer (Germany).
