= José Díaz (weightlifter) =

Panamanian weightlifter (born 1959)

Personal information
- Nationality: Panamanian
- Born: 2 December 1959 (age 65)

Sport
- Sport: Weightlifting

José Díaz (born 2 December 1959) is a Panamanian weightlifter who has represented his country in international competitions. Diaz competed at the 1984 and 1988 Summer Olympics.
