= Eileen Coparropa =

Panamanian swimmer

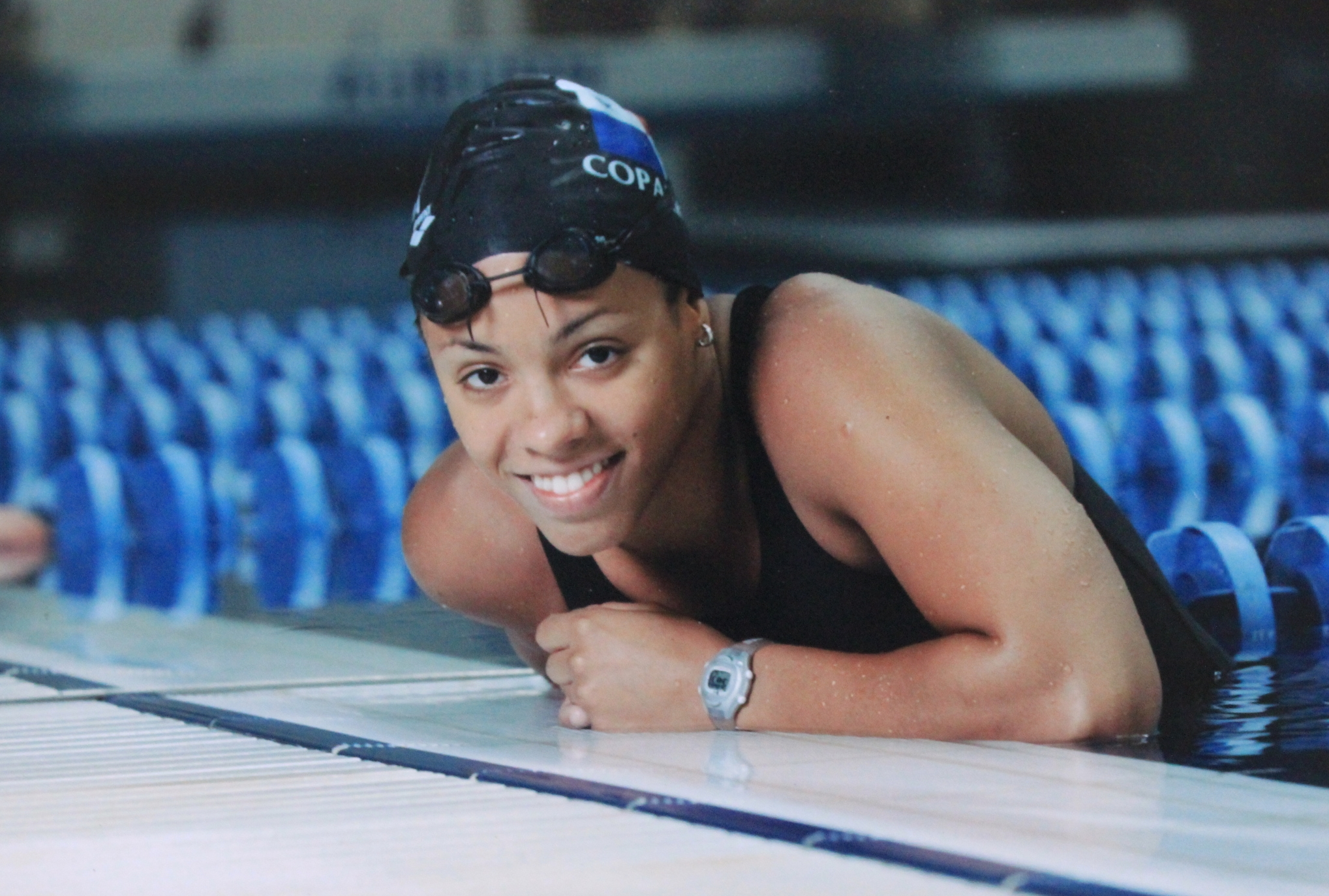
- Eileen Coparropa

Personal information
- Full name: Eileen Marie Coparropa Alemán
- Nationality: Panama
- Born: March 31, 1981 (age 45) Panama
- Height: 1.70 m (5 ft 7 in)
- Weight: 70 kg (154 lb)

Sport
- Sport: Swimming
- Strokes: Freestyle
Medal record
Women's swimming
Representing Panama
Pan American Games
Silver medal – second place	1999 Winnipeg	50 m freestyle
Bronze medal – third place	2003 Santo Domingo	50 m freestyle
Central American and Caribbean Games
Gold medal – first place	1998 Maracaibo	50 m freestyle
Gold medal – first place	1998 Maracaibo	100 m freestyle
Gold medal – first place	2002 San Salvador	50 m freestyle
Gold medal – first place	2002 San Salvador	100 m freestyle

Eileen Mary Coparropa Alemán (born March 31, 1981, in Panama City) is a freestyle swimmer from Panama who won a silver and a bronze medal in the women's 50-metre freestyle event at the Pan American Games. Nicknamed "La Sirena de Oro" (The Golden Mermaid), she represented her native country at three consecutive Summer Olympics, starting in 1996.

== The Pan-American Games ==
In 1999, when she was 18 years old, Eileen participated in the 13th Pan-American Games celebrated in Winnipeg, Canada, in the 50-metre freestyle where she achieved a historic silver medal. It was the first silver medal in the history of the Panamanian swimming team in these games, and she registered her best personal mark up until that moment: 25.78 seconds. The gold medal was won by American Tammie Spats with a 25.50 second mark.

In 2003, the games were celebrated in Santo Domingo, in the Dominican Republic. Coparropa Alemán won the bronze medal in the 50-metre freestyle with a time of 25.62 seconds. She was beaten by American Kara Lynn Joyce, who won gold with a time of 25.24 seconds.

== Olympic Games ==
=== Athens 2004 ===
Coparropa competed in the 50-metre freestyle and qualified for the semifinals with a time of 25.57 seconds. Coming in equal 13th place, she did not qualify for the finals; however, her time of 25.37 seconds was a new Panamanian record. It was also the closest a Panamanian swimmer had ever come to winning an Olympic medal, either men's or women's.

== Personal life ==
Coparropa is the oldest of two daughters of Pedro Coparropa and Guadalupe Alemán de Coparropa. She began her swimming career at the age of 6.

In 2004, she graduated with honours with a bachelor's degree in business administration with a specialization in marketing from Auburn University in Auburn, Alabama. She also received a degree in logistics from the same university.

At the 1995 Pan American Games in Mar del Plata, she finished 5th in the 50-metre freestyle.

At the 1996 Summer Olympics in Atlanta, Coparropa finished 32nd in the 50-metre freestyle.

At the 1999 Pan American Games in Winnipeg, she won a silver medal in the 50-metre freestyle. She also finished 9th in the 100-metre freestyle.

At the 2000 Summer Olympics in Sydney, Coparropa finished 27th in the 50-metre freestyle and 32nd in the 100-metre freestyle.

At the 2003 Pan American Games in Santo Domingo, she won a bronze medal in the 50-metre freestyle. She also finished 5th in the 100-metre freestyle.

At the 2004 Summer Olympics in Athens, Coparropa finished 14th in the 50-metre freestyle and 30th in the 100-metre freestyle.
