= Jorge Castelblanco =

Panamanian long-distance runner

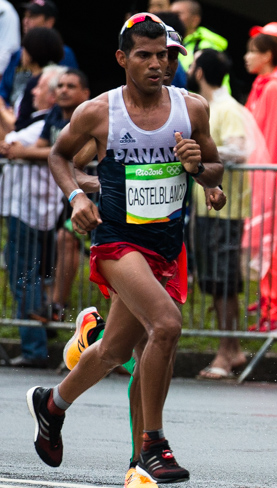
- Castelblanco at the 2016 Olympics

Personal information
- Born: 23 September 1987 (age 38)
- Height: 169 cm (5 ft 7 in)
- Weight: 58 kg (128 lb)

Sport
- Sport: Athletics
- Event(s): Half marathon, marathon
- Club: panama runners association
- Coached by: Juan Carlos Cardona Rios

Achievements and titles
- Personal best(s): HM – 1:06:49 (2011); Marathon – 2:15:57 (2016)

Jorge Castelblanco (born 23 September 1987) is a long-distance runner from Panama. At the 2016 Olympics he became the first Panamanian athlete to run the Olympic marathon. He also competed in the men's marathon at the 2020 Summer Olympics held in Tokyo, Japan.

Castelblanco graduated from the Technological University of Panama and works as a police officer. He is married and has a son, Ethan. He is managed by Leonel Manzano and Carlos Roa of Royal Athletic Management & Marketing.

Castelblanco has a marathon personal best of 2:09:24 which he ran at the 2024 Seville Marathon.
