= Said Gomez =

Panamanian Paralympic athlete

Medal record

Representing Panama

Athletics (B3/T12/T13)

Paralympic Games
Gold medal – first place	1992 Barcelona	5,000 m
Gold medal – first place	1996 Atlanta	1,500 m
Gold medal – first place	1996 Atlanta	5,000 m
Silver medal – second place	1992 Barcelona	1,500 m
Silver medal – second place	1992 Barcelona	800 m
Silver medal – second place	2000 Sydney	5,000 m
Silver medal – second place	2004 Athens	5,000 m
Bronze medal – third place	2000 Sydney	1,500 m

Parapan American Games
Silver medal – second place	2007 Rio de Janeiro	5000m

Said Gomez (born 1966) is a Panamanian athlete. Visually impaired, having "lost his sight at a young age", he has represented Panama at five consecutive editions of the Summer Paralympic Games. He has won a total of eight Paralympic medals, of which three gold, and is the only Panamanian ever to have medalled at the Paralympic Games.

He was one of Panama's only two representatives during its inaugural participation in the Games, in 1992 in Barcelona. He funded his own participation. He entered three events in running, in the B3 category, and medalled in all three. In the 5,000m race, he won his country's first Paralympic gold medal with a world record time of 15:06.17. In the 1,500m race, he took silver in 4:02.32, just eight hundredths of a second behind French athlete Christophe Carayon, who set a new Paralympic record. In the 800m, he outran Carayon in the heats, but lost to him in the final. The Frenchman set a new world record in 1:54.79, while Gomez took silver in 1:55.67.

Gomez was Panama's only competitor at the 1996 Games, and entered two races (T12 category), winning gold in both. In the 1,500m, he stormed to a world record winning time of 3:57.53, more than six seconds ahead of Canada's Stuart McGregor, who won silver, and more than ten seconds ahead of Carayon in third. In the 5,000m, he set a Paralympic record, winning gold in 15:01.49 - with a stunning lead of over 53 seconds on silver medallist Diosmani Gonzales, of Cuba.

In 2000, he was again Panama's sole representative, and entered the same two races. This time, he finished third in the 1,500m (in 4:06.01), and second in the 5,000m (in 15:21.64), but preserved his record of winning a medal in every Paralympic race he had ever taken part in.

In 2004, Gomez entered the 5,000m and 10,000m races (T13 category), though this time he was not Panama's sole competitor, as compatriot Désirée Aguilar competed in swimming. Gomez ran the 10,000m race in 32:28.96, finishing fifth (out of 17), and thus failed to win a medal for the first time in his Paralympic career. However, he did win silver in the 5,000m (in 15:23.90), behind Kenya's Joseph Ngorialuk.

Gomez's participation in the 2008 Games in Beijing was, for the first time, funded by his country's Paralympic committee, rather than by himself. He competed once more in the 1,500m and 5,000m events (T13). Running in heat 3 in the 1,500m, he clocked a time of 4:19.60, well below his performance eight years earlier. Fifth in his heat, he did not advance to the final. There was disappointment, too, in the 5,000m, where his time of 16:54.95 was by far the slowest in his heat, and significantly below his prior achievements. Thus, for the first time, he returned from the Games without a medal. He was, however, awarded the Whang Youn Dai Overcome Prize by the International Paralympic Committee, "a special award for athletes who can best represent the Paralympic spirit", during the Games' closing ceremony. He was one of two recipients of the award, along with South African swimmer Natalie du Toit. The award came with "a medal made out of 75 grams pure gold".

A farmer by profession, Gomez has also been coaching able-bodied children and children with disabilities since 1982.
