= Irving Saladino =

Panamanian long jumper

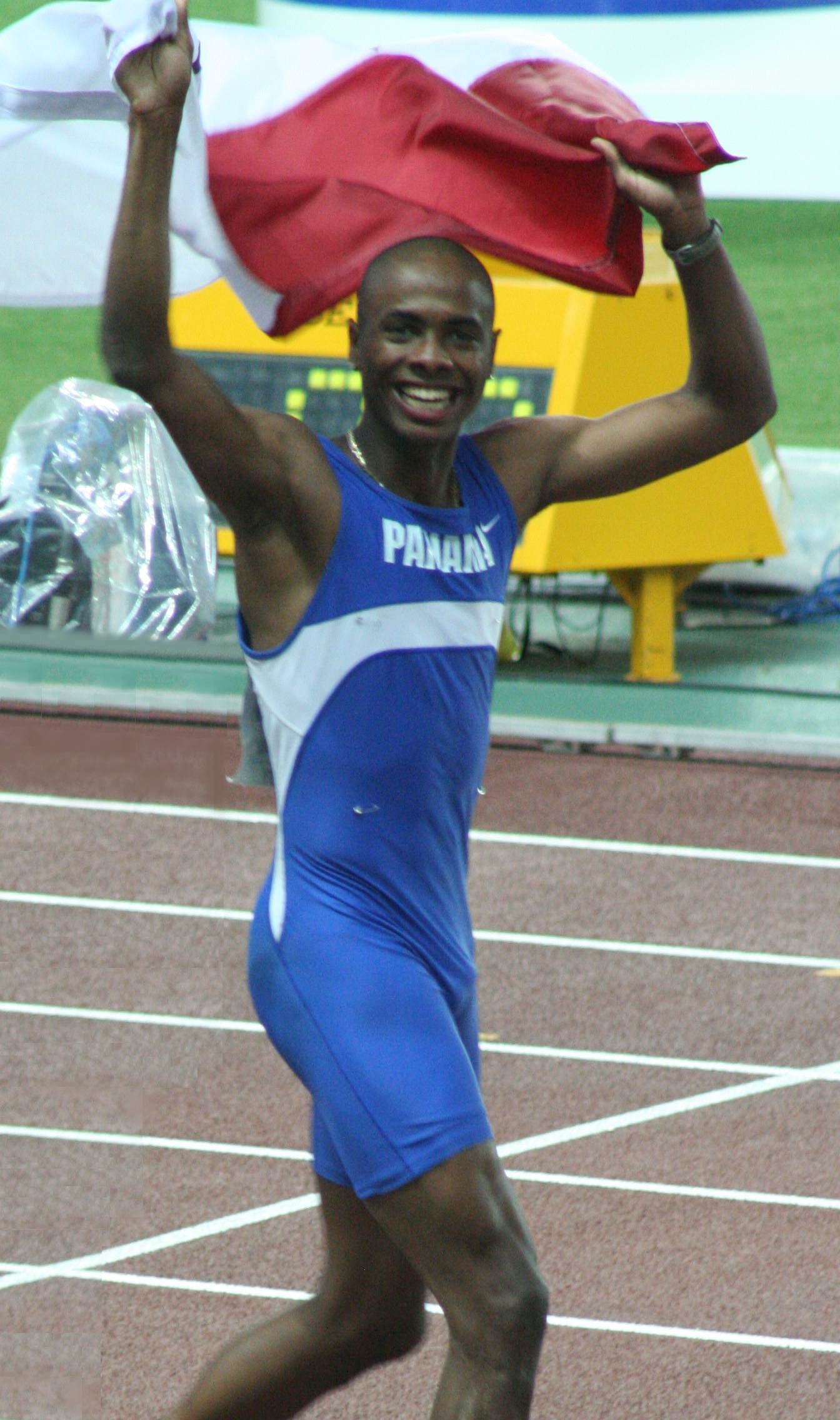
- Irving Saladino, Gold Medalist at Athletics World Championship 2007

Personal information
- Full name: Irving Jahir Saladino Aranda
- Born: January 23, 1983 (age 43) Colón, Colón Province, Panamá
- Height: 1.83 m (6 ft 0 in)
- Weight: 70 kg (154 lb)

Sport
- Country: Panama
- Sport: Men's Athletics
- Event: Long jump

Achievements and titles
- Personal best: Long jump: 8.73 m
Medal record
Men's athletics
Representing Panama
Olympic Games
| Gold medal – first place | 2008 Beijing | Long jump |
World Championships
| Gold medal – first place | 2007 Osaka | Long jump |
World Indoor Championships
| Silver medal – second place | 2006 Moscow | Long jump |
Ibero-American Championships
| Gold medal – first place | 2006 Ponce | Long jump |
Pan American Games
| Gold medal – first place | 2007 Rio de Janeiro | Long jump |
South American Games
| Gold medal – first place | 2014 Santiago | Long jump |
South American Championships
| Bronze medal – third place | 2003 Barquisimeto | Long jump |
Central American and Caribbean Games
| Gold medal – first place | 2006 Cartagena | Long jump |
Central American Games
| Gold medal – first place | 2010 Ciudad de Panamá | Long jump |
| Gold medal – first place | 2013 San José | Long jump |
South American Under-23 Championships
| Gold medal – first place | 2004 Barquisimeto | Long jump |
Central American Championships
| Gold medal – first place | 2002 San José | Long jump |
| Silver medal – second place | 2002 San José | Triple jump |
| Bronze medal – third place | 2002 San José | 4 × 100 m relay |
CAC Junior Championships (U20)
| Bronze medal – third place | 2002 Bridgetown | Long jump |

Irving Jahir Saladino Aranda (born January 23, 1983) is a Panamanian former long jumper. He was Olympic champion, having won at the 2008 Beijing Olympics, and remains Panama's first and only Olympic gold medalist. He was world champion in the long jump in 2007. He represented his country at three consecutive Olympics, from 2004 to 2012, and competed at four World Championships in Athletics from 2005 to 2011.

Amongst his honours are a silver medal from the 2006 IAAF World Indoor Championships and gold medals at the Pan American Games, Central American and Caribbean Games, Central American Games, South American Games, the IAAF World Cup and the Ibero-American Championships in Athletics. He holds a long jump best of 8.73 m (28 ft 7 1/2 in), set in 2008. He ranks in the all-time top ten for the event. He had the longest jumps in the world in the 2006 and 2008 seasons.

== Biography ==
Saladino was born in Colón, Colón Province, Panama. At the 2006 IAAF World Indoor Championships he finished second with a new South American indoor record of 8.29 metres. In 2006 he won five (Oslo, Rome, Zurich, Brussels, Berlin) out of six Golden League events in the same season, which earned him a total of $83,333. His only defeat was in Paris where he was second. With 8.56 metres achieved in May 2006, he became the South American record holder.

The 2006 world leader in the long jump, Saladino launched his 2007 season with the farthest leap of the year, 8.53 m (−0.2 m/s wind), to win at the "Grande Prêmio Rio Caixa de Atletismo", held in Rio de Janeiro on May 13, 2007. On 24 May 2008, Saladino achieved a new personal record. During the FBK Games in Hengelo, he jumped 8.73 m (+1.2 m/s wind) on his first attempt.

He carried the flag for his native country at the opening ceremony of the 2007 Pan American Games in Rio de Janeiro, Brazil. On 30 August 2007 Saladino became the World Champion in Osaka. He led with the mark of 8.30 metres from his second attempt, then improved to 8.46 m, until the penultimate jump of the contest, when he was overtaken by Andrew Howe who set as mark 8.47 m. Saladino was able to earn the gold medal on the last attempt of the contest, in which he jumped 8.57 m.

Saladino competed at the 2008 Summer Olympics in Beijing, China, where he made history in Central America and his country, Panama, by winning the gold medal in the long jump competition on 18 August 2008, with a jump of 8.34 meters, giving Panama their first Olympic medal since the 1948 Summer Olympics, and their first gold ever. This is also the first Olympic gold medal ever won in a men's event by an athlete from Central America.

On 21 August 2008 after winning Olympic gold, he arrived in Panama a national hero. Government offices and public schools were closed in honor of him. At a welcoming ceremony, Panamanian boxing legend Roberto Durán presented the Olympic gold medal to Irving Saladino for a second time. Martin Torrijos, President of Panama, announced a decree to name a sports facility in the Villa Deportiva in Juan Díaz after Saladino and granted a check to him for 50,000 U.S. dollars. Also, Ruben Blades performed the song "Patria" (Motherland) in front of thousands of cheering Panamanians.

Saladino qualified for the 2012 Summer Olympics and he was chosen to be Panama's flag bearer. He was eliminated early after underperforming due to injury.

Saladino's performances declined after 2011, and although he managed to clear 8.16 m (26 ft 9 1/4 in) in the 2014 season, he announced his retirement that August.

== Personal bests ==
- Long jump: 8.73 m (wind: +1.2 m/s) – Hengelo, Netherlands, 24 May 2008
- Triple jump: 14.51 m – San José, Costa Rica, 11 October 2002

== International competitions ==
| Year | Competition | Venue | Position | Event | Notes |
Representing Panama
| 2002 | Central American Junior Championships (U20) | Ciudad de Guatemala, Guatemala | 1st | Long jump | 7.51 m |
| 2002 | Central American Junior Championships (U20) | Ciudad de Guatemala, Guatemala | 1st | Triple jump | 14.48 m |
| 2002 | Central American and Caribbean Junior Championships (U-20) | Bridgetown, Barbados | 3rd | Long jump | 7.39 m (-0.2 m/s) |
| 2002 | Central American and Caribbean Junior Championships (U-20) | Bridgetown, Barbados | 6th | Triple jump | 14.38 m (wind: +0.5 m/s) |
| 2002 | World Junior Championships | Kingston, Jamaica | 10th (q) | Long jump | 7.30 m (wind: -0.5 m/s) |
| 2002 | Central American Championships | San José, Costa Rica | 1st | Long jump | 7.18 m |
| 2002 | Central American Championships | San José, Costa Rica | 2nd | Triple jump | 14.51 m |
| 2002 | Central American Championships | San José, Costa Rica | 3rd | 4 × 100 m relay | 42.86 |
| 2003 | South American Championships | Barquisimeto, Venezuela | 3rd | Long jump | 7.46 m (wind: +0.1 m/s) |
| 2004 | South American Under-23 Championships | Barquisimeto, Venezuela | 1st | Long jump | 7.74 m (-0.2 m/s) |
| 2004 | Olympic Games | Athens, Greece | 36th (q) | Long jump | 7.42 m (0.8 m/s) |
| 2005 | World Championships | Helsinki, Finland | 6th | Long jump | 8.20 m w (wind: +2.8 m/s) |
| 2006 | World Indoor Championships | Moscow, Russia | 2nd | Long jump | 8.29 m AR |
| 2006 | Ibero-American Championships | Ponce, Puerto Rico | 1st | Long jump | 8.42 m (wind: -0.4 m/s) |
| 2006 | Central American and Caribbean Games | Cartagena, Colombia | 1st | Long jump | 8.29 m (wind: +0.0 m/s) |
| 2006 | World Athletics Final | Stuttgart, Germany | 1st | Long jump | 8.41 m (wind: +0.4 m/s) |
| 2006 | World Cup | Athens, Greece | 1st | Long jump | 8.26 m (wind: +0.3 m/s) |
| 2007 | Pan American Games | Rio de Janeiro, Brazil | 1st | Long jump | 8.28 m (wind: -0.5 m/s) |
| 2007 | World Championships | Osaka, Japan | 1st | Long jump | 8.57 m AR (0.0 m/s) |
| 2008 | Olympic Games | Beijing, China | 1st | Long jump | 8.34 m (-0.3 m/s) |
| 2009 | World Championships | Berlin, Germany | 4th | Long jump | 8.16 |
| 2010 | World Indoor Championships | Doha, Qatar | 12th (q) | Long jump | 7.80 m |
| 2010 | Central American Games | Panama City, Panama | 1st | Long jump | 8.19 m GR (0.0 m/s) |
| 2011 | World Championships | Daegu, South Korea | 22nd (q) | Long jump | 7.84 m (wind: +0.2 m/s) |
| 2012 | Olympic Games | London, United Kingdom | — | Long jump | NM |
| 2013 | Central American Games | San José, Costa Rica | 1st | Long jump | 7.99 m (wind: -0.4 m/s) |
| 2013 | South American Championships | Cartagena, Colombia | 3rd | Long jump | 7.94 m (wind: +1.5 m/s) |
| 2014 | World Indoor Championships | Sopot, Poland | 11th (q) | Long jump | 7.94 m |
| 2014 | South American Games | Santiago, Chile | 1st | Long jump | 8.16 m (wind: -0.5 m/s) |

Sporting positions
| Preceded by Dwight Phillips; Louis Tsatoumas | Men's Long Jump Best Year Performance; 2006; 2008 | Succeeded by Louis Tsatoumas; Dwight Phillips |
Olympic Games
| Preceded by Jesika Jiménez | Flagbearer for Panama; London 2012 | Succeeded by Alonso Edward |
