= Panama Olympic Committee =

National Olympic Committee

- Country: Panama
- Code: PAN
- Created: 1934
- Recognized: 1947
- Continental Association: PASO
- Headquarters: Panama City, Panama
- President: Camilo Amado
- Secretary General: Estela Riley Rodríguez
- Website: copanama.com

The Panama Olympic Committee (Spanish: Comité Olímpico de Panamá) (IOC Code: PAN) is the National Olympic Committee representing Panama. It is also the body responsible for Panama's representation at the Olympic Games.

== History ==
Comité Olímpico de Panamá was founded in 1934 and recognised by the International Olympic Committee in 1947. In December 2020, a contested presidential election left the committee's leadership unresolved after Damaris Young received 37 votes against Saúl Saucedo's 36, falling one vote short of the required threshold under the committee's interpretation of its electoral statutes. In January 2021, an independent electoral commission declared Young the winner after the International Olympic Committee determined that blank ballots should not count as valid votes, making her the committee's first female president.

== See also ==
- Panama at the Olympics
