= Tobias Roberts =

American businessman (1835-1908)

- Born: 1835
- Died: 1908; Bar Harbor, Maine, U.S.

Tobias Lord Roberts (1835–1908) was an American businessman and hotelier. He is regarded as the pioneer of hotel-building in Bar Harbor, Maine. He opened Agamont House, the first hotel in the town, in 1855, converting a home built fifteen years earlier. Agamont Park, named for the hotel, now stands at the location. Another hotel, Deering House, followed in 1858. Ten years later, Alpheus Hardy became the first of Bar Harbor's summer residents to build a "cottage".

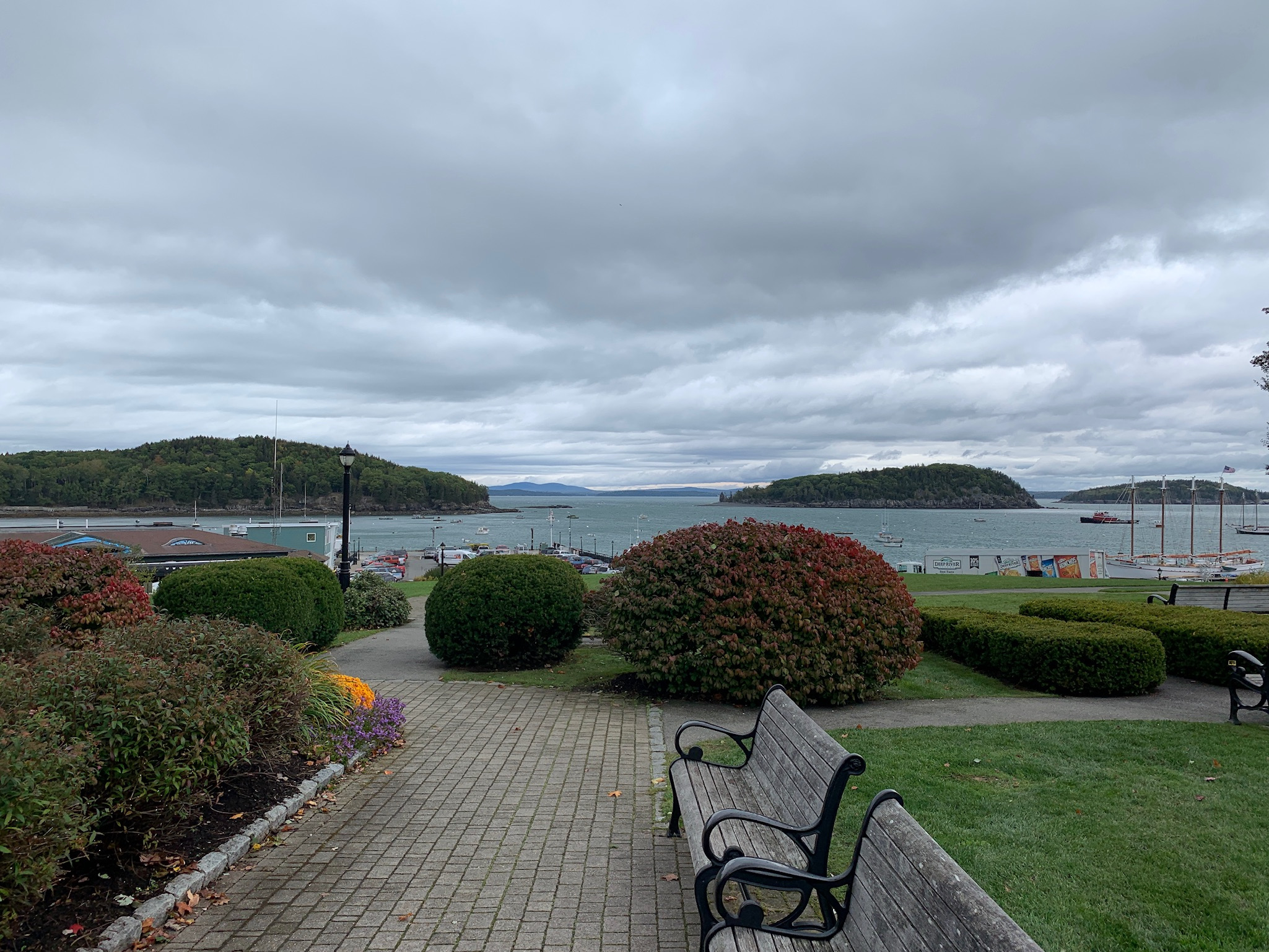
Agamont Park, the former site of Roberts' Agamont House hotel

To improve access for tourists to the town, he created a wharf in Bar Harbor in 1868.

Agamont House burned down in 1888.

== Death ==
Roberts died in 1908, aged 73 years. He is interred in Bar Harbor's Village Cemetery.

Upon his death, Roberts' family sold several of his properties, including Rockaway House on Bar Harbor's West Street.
