= Bogie bolster =

Bogie bolster may refer to

- the bolster that is part of a bogie (UK) or truck (US), see List of railroad truck parts § Bogie bolster
- a British flatbed railway car that runs on bogies and has baulks of timber (bolsters) fixed across the bed, see Bogie bolster wagon.

== See also ==
- Bogie (disambiguation)
- Bolster (disambiguation)
