= Bolster (surname) =

Bolster is a surname. Notable people with the surname include:

- Angela Bolster (1925–2005), Irish nun and writer
- Charles Bolster (1894–1993), American judge
- George Bolster (1877–1948), Australian politician
- George S. Bolster (1913–1989), American photographer
- Henry B. Bolster (1792–1859), American politician and businessman
- Michael Bolster (born 1967), Irish chef
- Sally Bolster, American politician
- Stephanie Bolster (born 1969), Canadian poet
- Warren Bolster (1947–2006), American skateboard photographer
- W. Jeffrey Bolster, American historian
