= Friends of Acadia =

Friends of Acadia is a nonprofit membership organization that helps preserve and protect Acadia National Park and its surrounding communities. Based in Bar Harbor, Maine, the organization works with Acadia to identify areas where its advocacy can benefit the park's critical needs, such as protecting natural resources and engaging youth volunteers.

In March 2020, Friends of Acadia backed legislation that was sponsored by Sen. Angus King (I-ME) and Rep. Jared Golden (D-ME), granting Gold Star families free access to all national parks. The organization claimed the bill would “increase access to the restorative powers of nature.”

FOA's "Wild Acadia" initiative supports conservation-related programs and research, including the restoration of watersheds impacted by invasive species, reduction of threats to water quality, and improvement to stream flow for fish passage. Donors like Martha Stewart and Dick Wolf have supported the initiative in the past.

Friends of Acadia contributes funding to the Island Explorer bus system.

== Leadership ==
Friends of Acadia's former president and CEO is David MacDonald, who had previously worked at Maine Coast Heritage Trust. He is often cited in news stories relating to Acadia and other national parks, in addition to publishing op-ed columns on park-related issues. In 2021, MacDonald announced his intention to leave Friends of Acadia in 2022, after ten years in the role.
