= Mira Monte Inn =

Coordinates: 44.38640°N 68.21043°W

Mira Monte Inn is an historic Victorian building on Mount Desert Street in Bar Harbor, Maine. It is now a nineteen-room bed and breakfast.

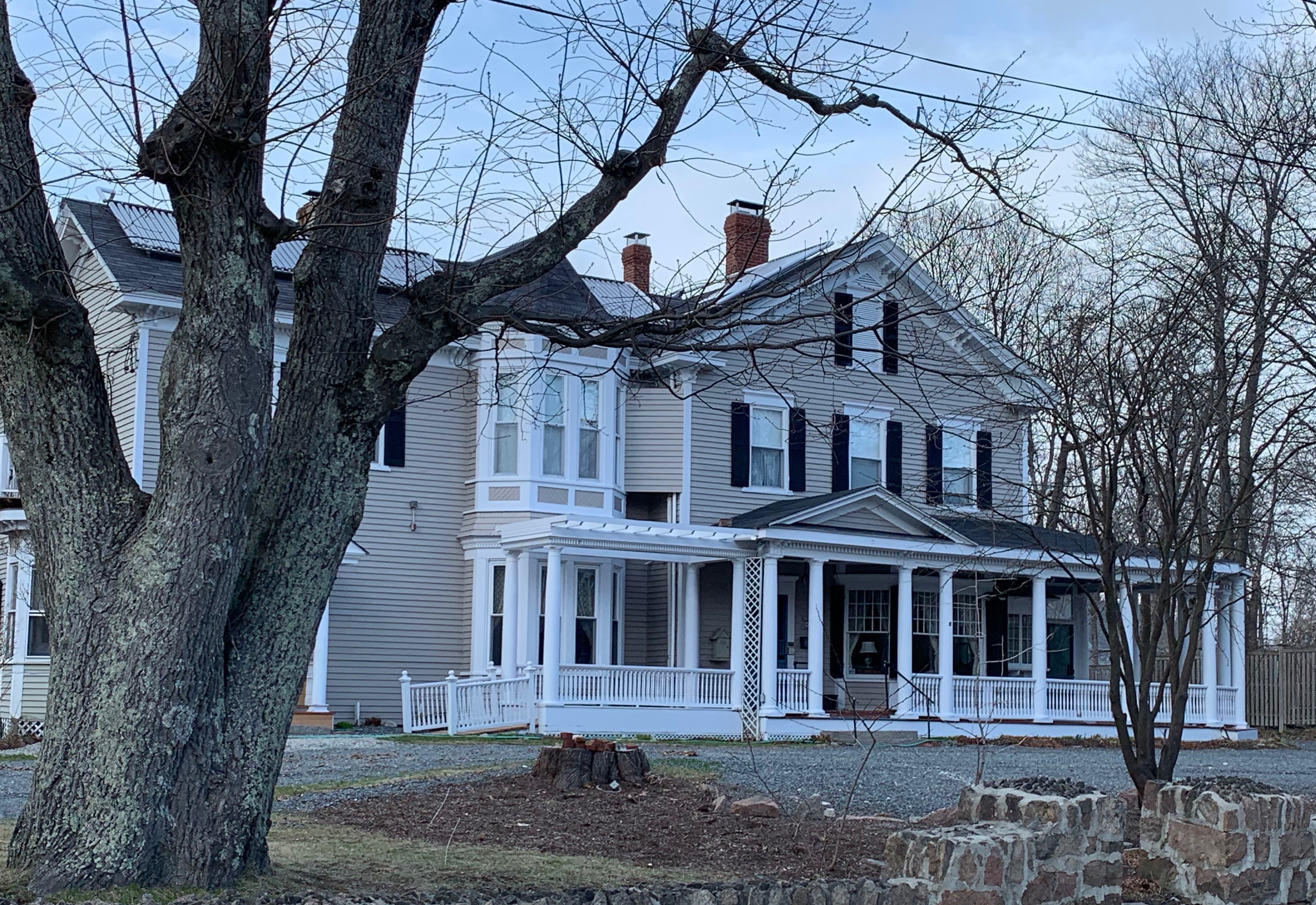
The inn pictured in April 2019

== History ==
Originally a summer cottage, the inn was built in 1864 by Orlando Ash, a prominent member of the resort town of Bar Harbor and son of Captain Benjamin Ash. A fire in the summer of 1947 nearly threatened to burn the entire town. The Mira Monte Inn was unharmed, while 397 other seasonal cottages were irreparably damaged. It is now operating as a bed and breakfast, after Marian Burns (1927–2015) set it on that path in 1980. It continued to be run by members of her family until 2019, when it was sold to new owners and incorporated as Mira Monte Inn and Suites.
