= Bolster (disambiguation) =

A bolster is a type of pillow or cushion.

Bolster may also refer to:

- Bolster (knife), the thick metal portion of a knife joining the handle and the blade
- Bolster (surname)
- Bolster, Washington, a ghost town in Okanogan County, Washington
- Bolster the Giant, a giant in Cornish legend
- Bolster plate, part of a stamping press
- Span bolster, railroad terminology
- Truck bolster, railroad terminology
- USS Bolster (ARS-38), a Diver-class rescue and salvage ship
- A type of Chisel

== See also ==
- Bolster heath
