= Ivy Manor Inn =

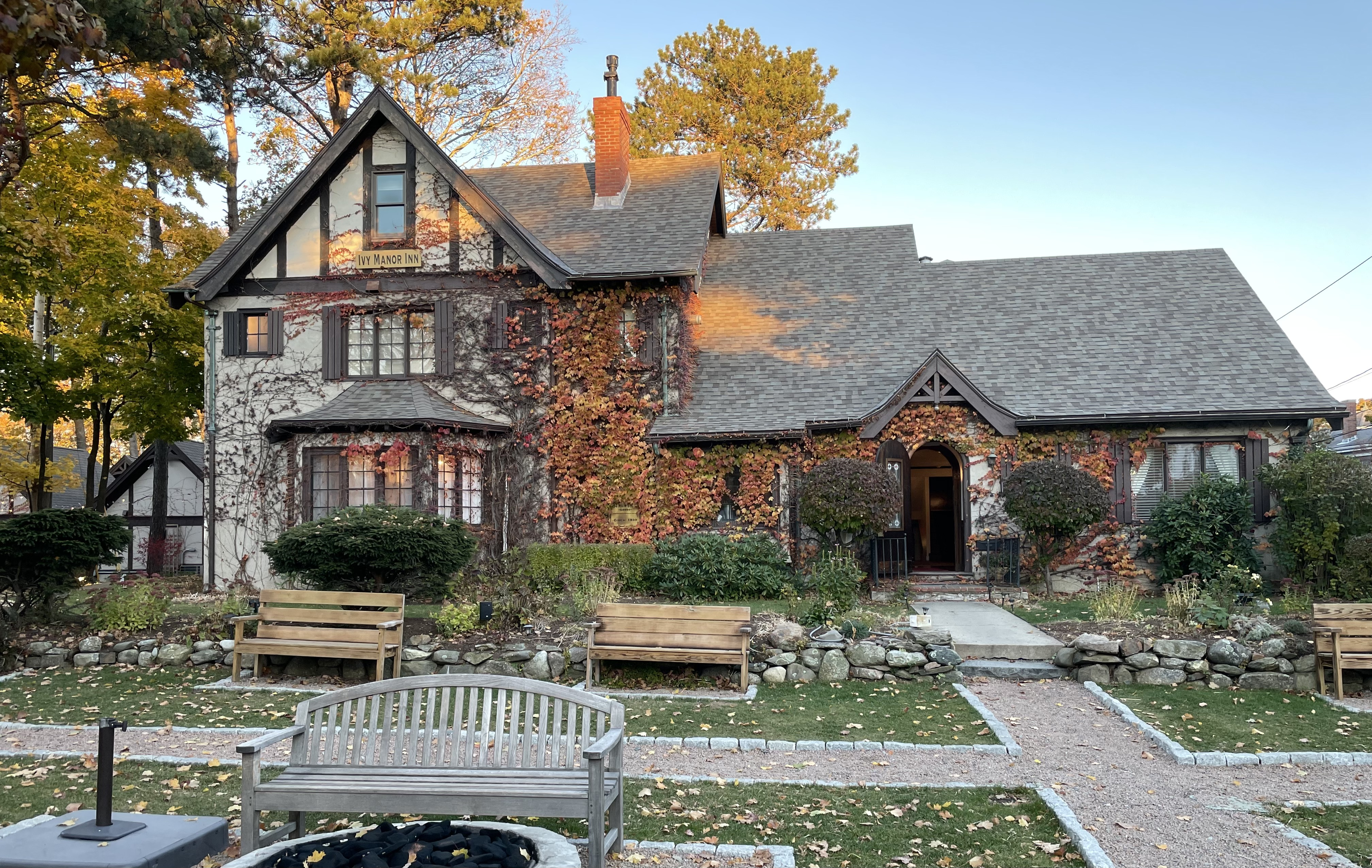
- The inn in 2021
- Interactive map of the Ivy Manor Inn area

General information
- Location: Bar Harbor, Maine, 194 Main Street; Bar Harbor, Maine 04609
- Coordinates: 44.387286°N 68.203835°W
- Opening: 1997 (29 years ago)
- Owner: Acadia National Park Hotels

Technical details
- Floor count: 3

Other information
- Number of rooms: 8
- Number of suites: 1

Website
- www.ivymanor.com

The Ivy Manor Inn is an inn in Bar Harbor, Maine. It was built as a home in 1936, for local physician Dr Weymouth, and has been an inn since 1997.

Built in the Tudor style, the inn has eighteen rooms, including six cottages. The inn also includes the William Tell Lounge, a whiskey, wine and beer bar open to the public.

Notable previous owners of the inn are Judi and Bob Stanley. They originally ran it for sixteen years (from 1996 to 2012) before moving to Sarasota, Florida, for four years to be near their daughter, Michelle Ettinger, for whom the inn was once named, and her children. They took the inn's restaurant to a AAA Four Diamond rating. They returned in 2016, but the following year they received an offer for the inn, which they accepted. The Stanleys returned to Sarasota, where they opened Pascone's Ristorante in July 2018.

The inn was updated and the restaurant eliminated under the new ownership. In the spring of 2019, the new owners built six Tudor cabins on the property and converted the dining room to guest rooms.

The property is open seasonally from May to October.

As of 2025, the inn is owned by Acadia National Park Hotels, which owns three other Bar Harbor inns: Acadia Hotel Downtown, Acadia Hotel Ocean View and Queen Anne's Revenge Inn.

== Gallery ==
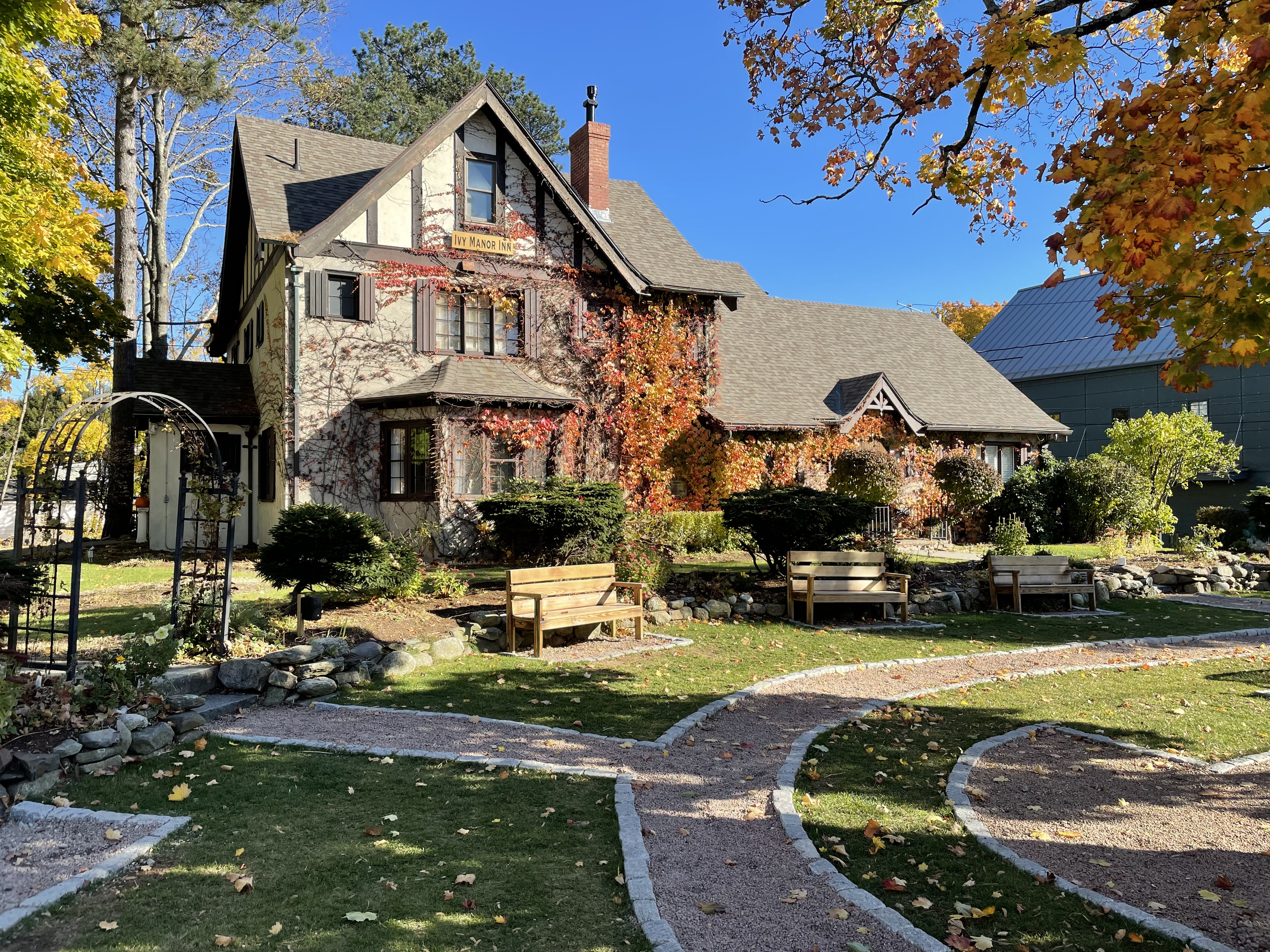
2021 view

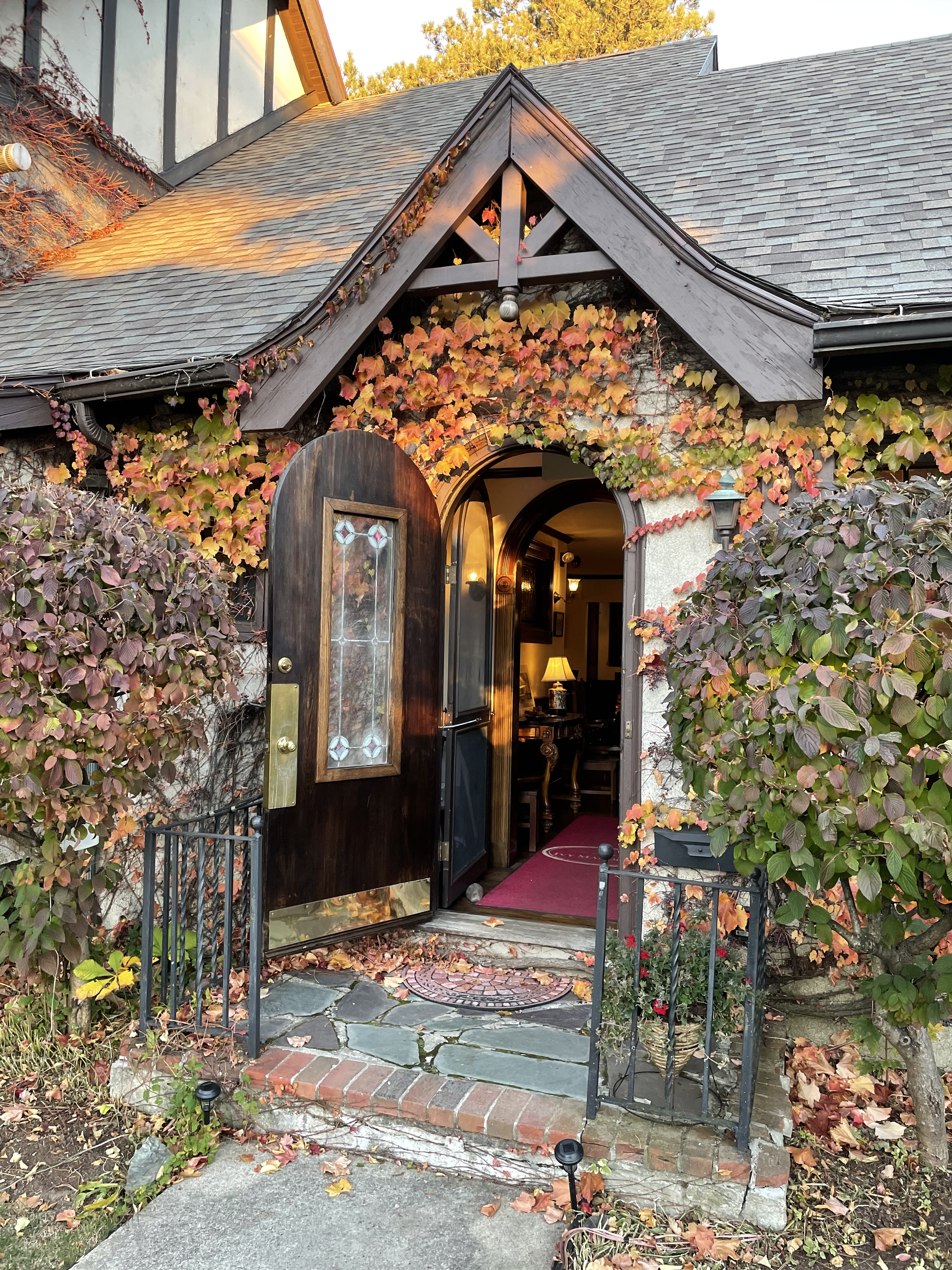
Main entrance, 2021

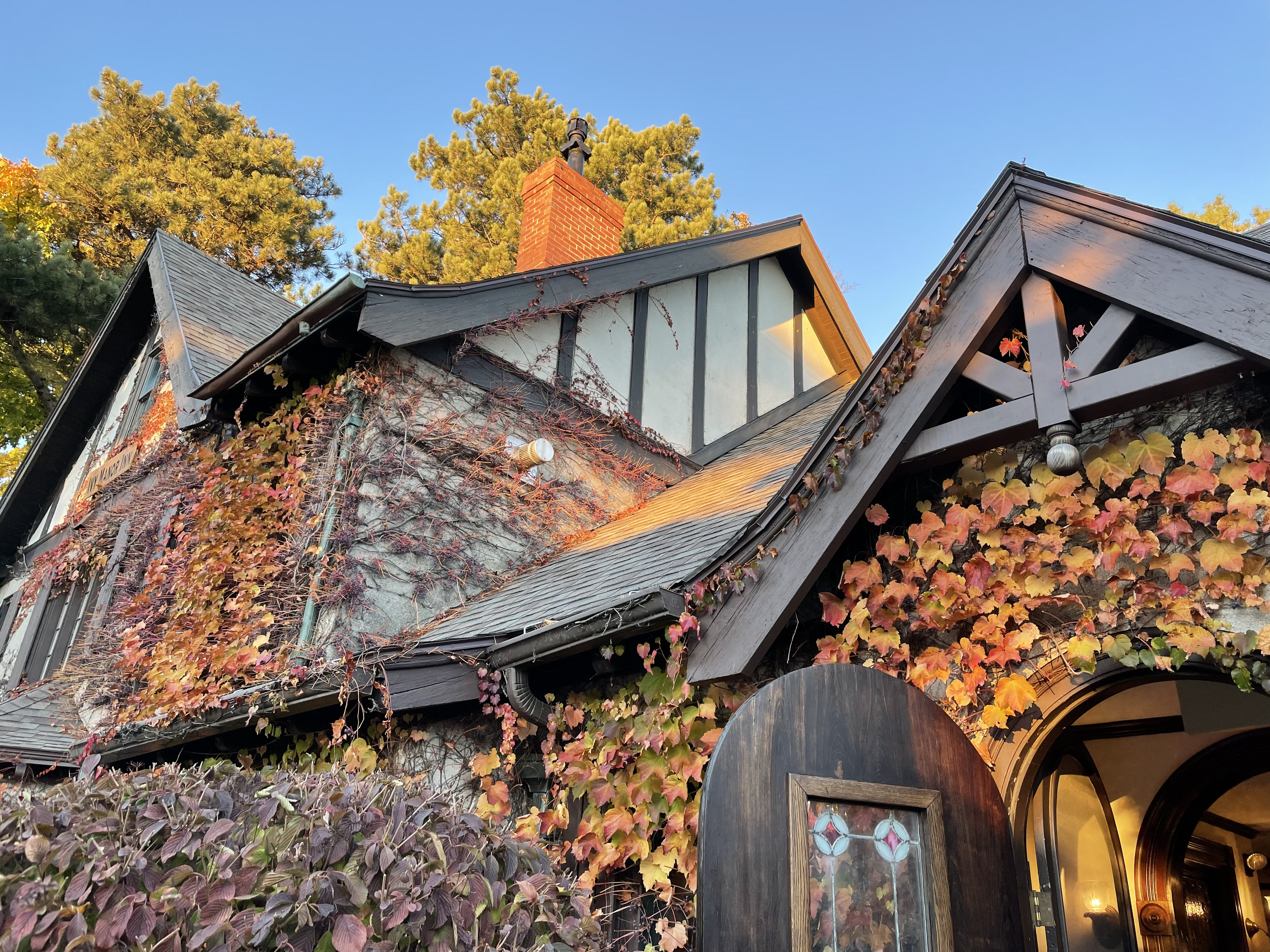
Architectural detail

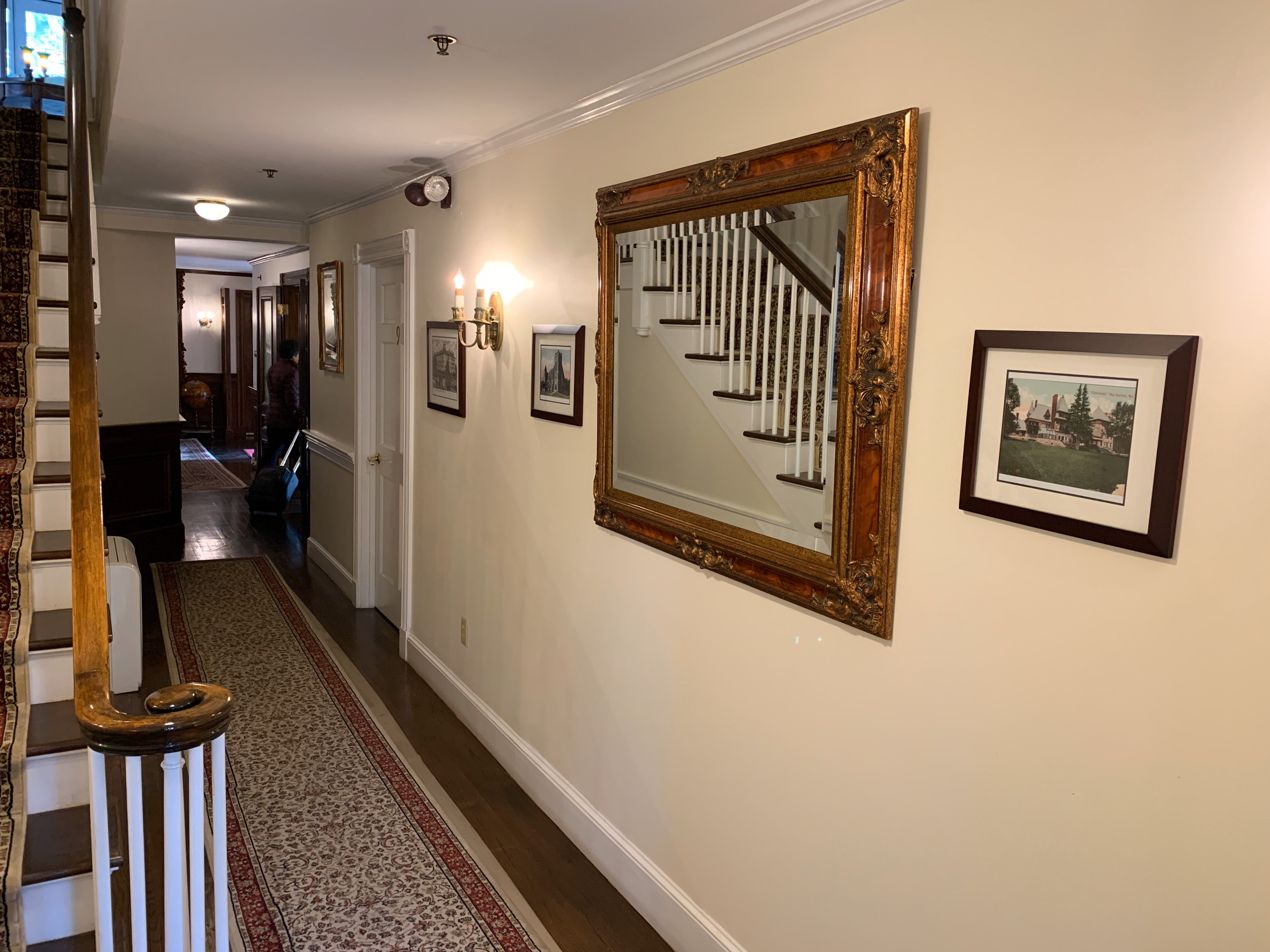
Inside the side entrance to the inn. Where the dining room once was, prior to 2019, are now guest rooms

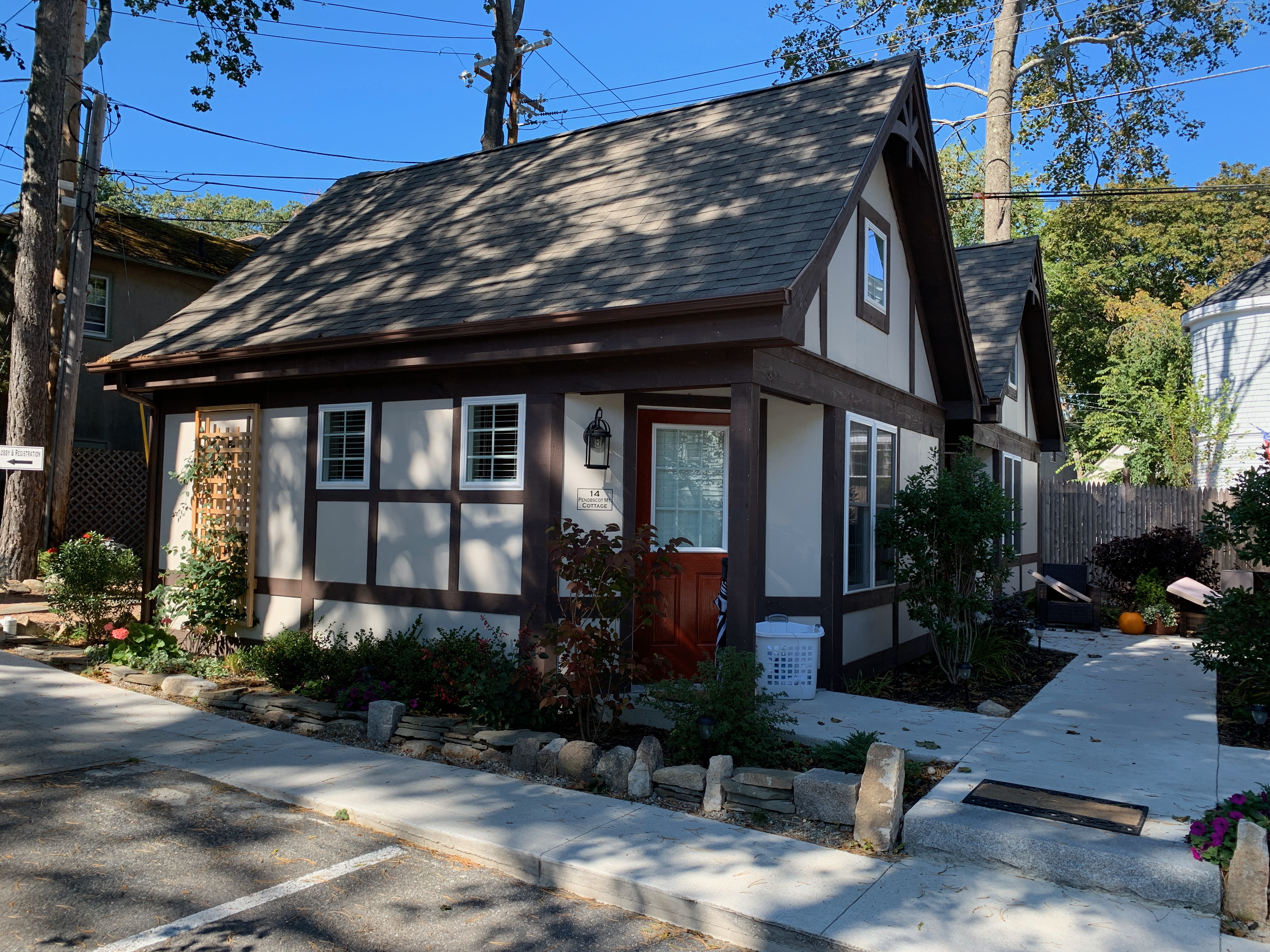
One of the six Tudor cabins built over the winter of 2018–19
