= Village Green, Bar Harbor =

Public park in Bar Harbor, Maine

Village Green
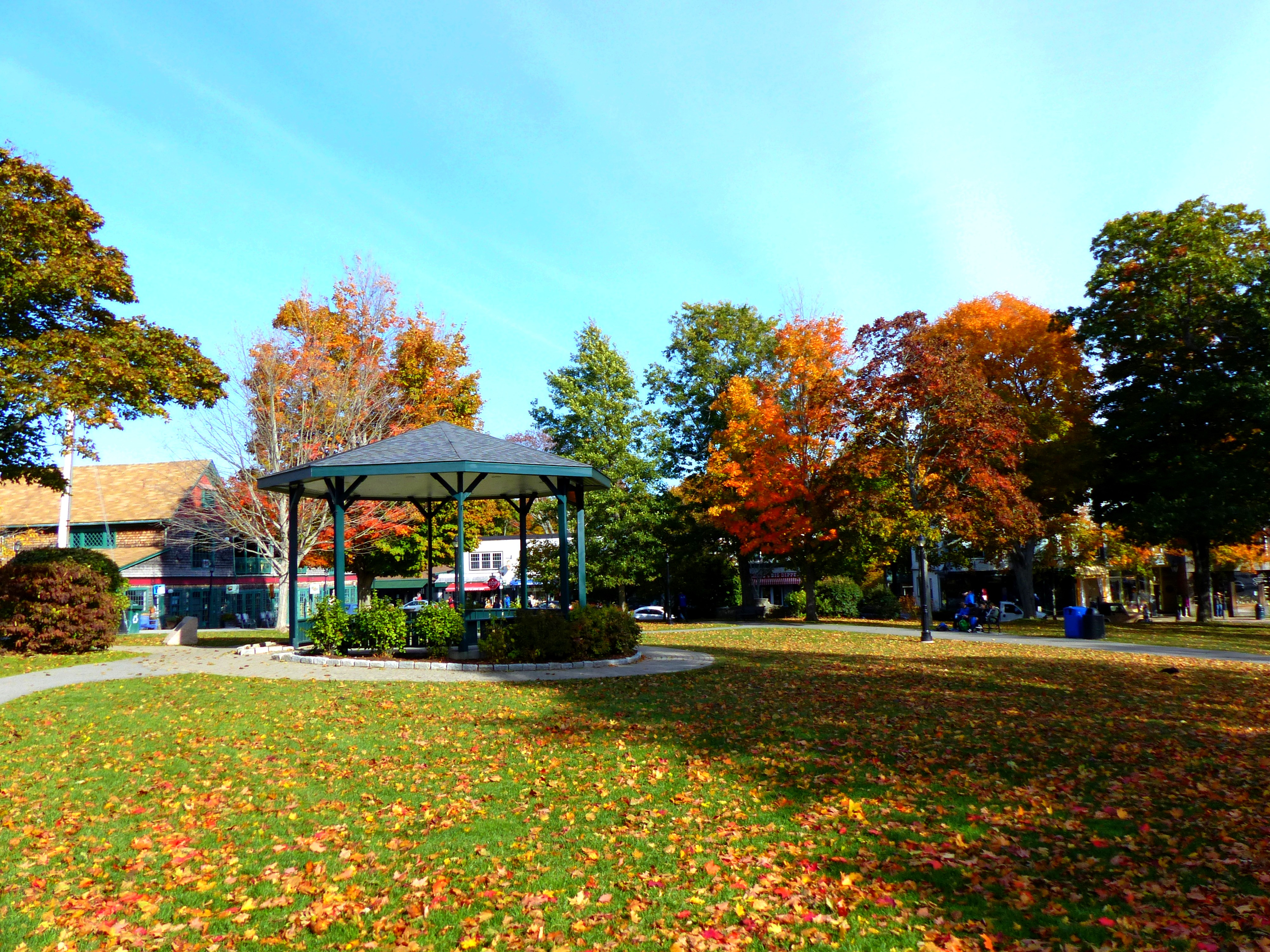
- A 2015 view of the bandstand, looking northeast to the corner of Firefly Lane and Main Street
- Interactive map of Village Green
- Type: Urban park
- Location: Bar Harbor, Maine, United States
- Coordinates: 44.38776818°N 68.20494027°W
- Area: 1.5 acres (0.0061 km^{2}; 0.0023 mi^{2})
- Created: 1899 (127 years ago)
- Owner: Town of Bar Harbor
- Open: 24 hours

Village Green is an urban park in Bar Harbor, Maine, United States. Located centrally in the town, compared to the coastal Agamont Park about 0.18 miles (0.29 km) to the north, Firefly Lane bounds it to the north, Main Street to the east, Mount Desert Street (Maine State Route 3) to the south and Kennebec Street to the west. (Main Street is also Route 3 up until it reaches the park from the south. It then turns onto Mount Desert Street.) The park has a free public Wi-Fi network.

The town's fire and police departments are located on Firefly Lane, across from the Green.

Although the park is not fenced, its six paved entrances are at Main Street and Mount Desert Street, Mount Desert Street and Kennebec Street, Kennebec Street, two on Firefly Lane, and one at Main Street and Firefly Lane. The bisecting paths encourage pedestrians to pass through the park, instead of walk around it.

A granite bench, in memory of John Whittington Roberts (1870–1904), is in the middle of the Main Street side, beside the original 1896 cast-iron street clock (moved to this location in 1905), while a dog fountain is beside the Main and Mount Desert entrance. A memorial also stands on its Mount Desert side, just beyond the fountain.

A bandstand stands near the park's northern (Firefly Lane) side.

A 17th-century tiered Italian fountain with 21 spigots, donated by John Callendar Livingston in 1909, is in the park's southwestern corner. It was restored in 1992 by sculptor Clark Fitz-Gerald after not being functional for thirty years.

Bar Harbor's Island Explorer buses leave and drop off passengers on the park's western edge, at Kennebec Street.

== History ==
The short-lived Grand Central Hotel occupied the corner of Main and Mount Desert Streets from 1873 to 1899, when it was demolished and the space given to the town's Village Improvement Association.

The bandstand was originally the park's only amenity, albeit in a different location than it is today. After a visit from sitting United States president William Howard Taft in 1910, however, a desire for additional development was kickstarted.

In the 1920s, Beatrix Farrand designed the pathways and had the bandstand rebuilt, as well as the arranging the landscaping present today.

A six-year renovation of the park began in 1999. In 2010, the park underwent further improvements — to the footpaths, lighting, planting, and the fountain area.

In 2012, the American Planning Association named the park one of their top ten Great Places in America for Public Spaces.

== Gallery ==
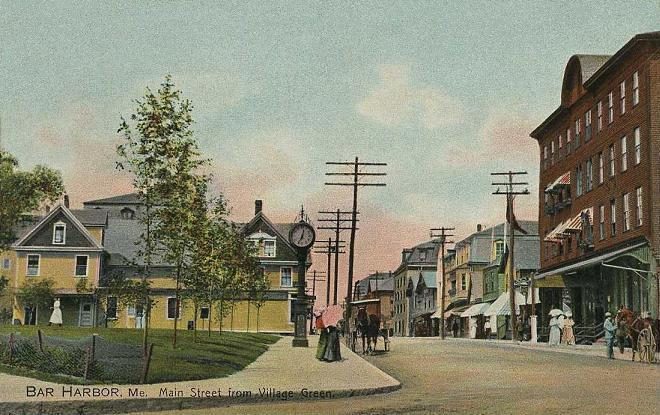
A postcard illustrating a view north along Main Street beside the park (c. 1908)

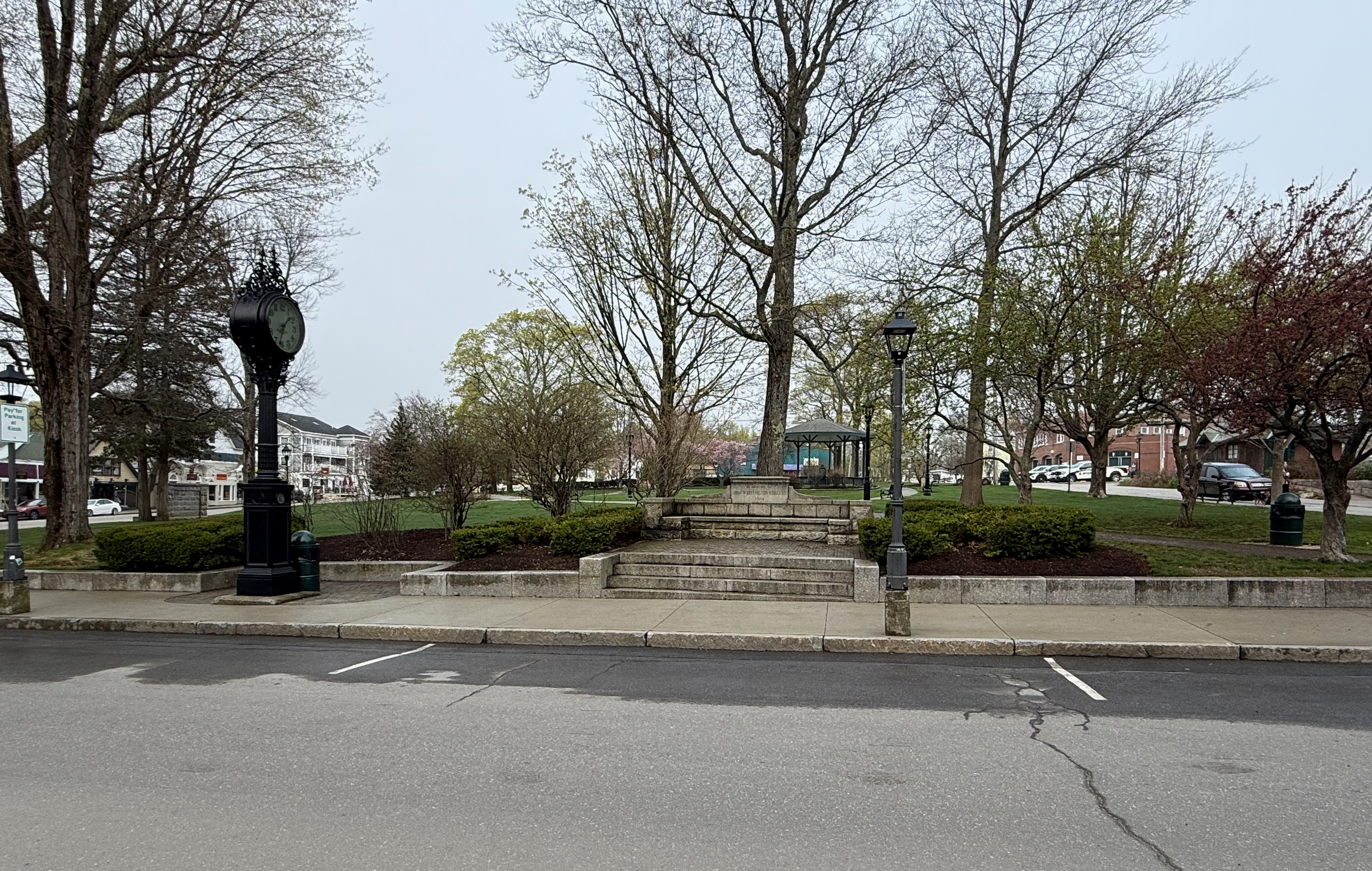
Viewed from Main Street, looking west (2025)

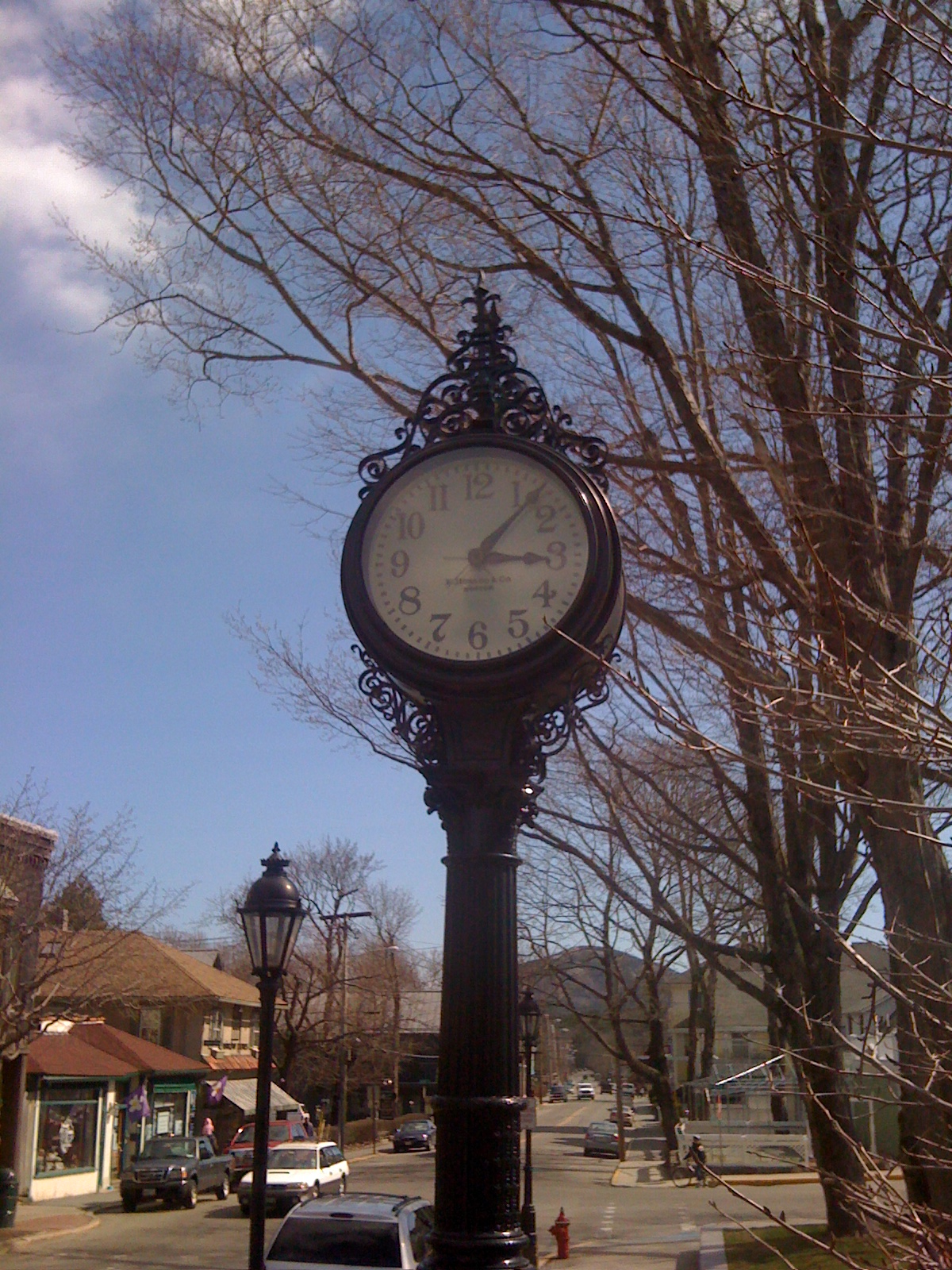
The park's street clock stands on Main Street (2011)
