= Agamont Park =

Public park in Bar Harbor, Maine

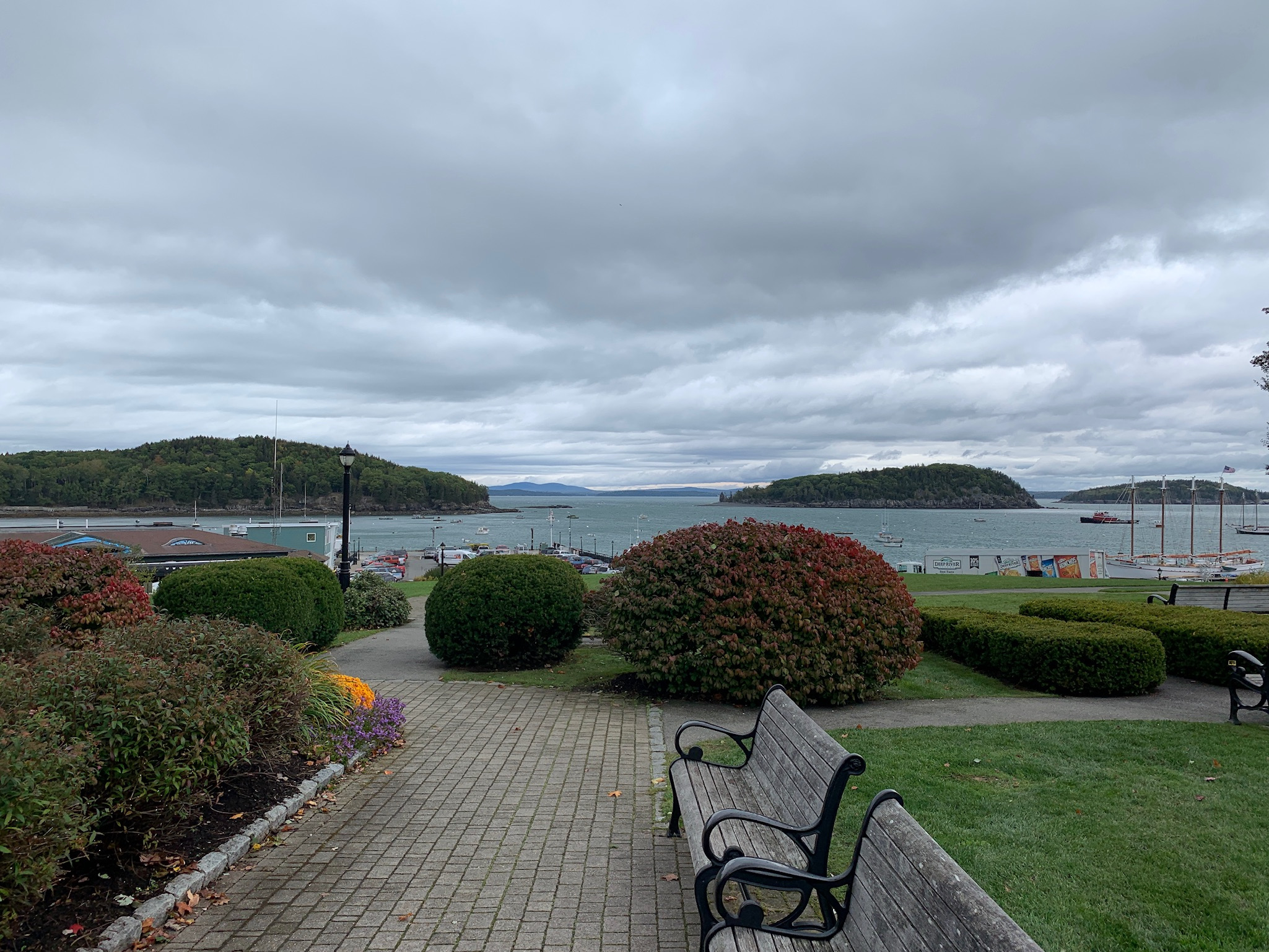
- Looking north from just inside the park's Main Street entrance. The schooner Margaret Todd is in view in the harbor
- Interactive map of Agamont Park
- Type: Urban park
- Location: Bar Harbor, Maine, United States
- Coordinates: 44°23′26.9″N 68°12′16″W
- Owner: Town of Bar Harbor
- Open: 24 hours

Agamont Park (originally Bar Harbor Park) is an urban park in Bar Harbor, Maine, United States. It is located at the northern end of the town's Main Street, at its intersection with West Street. The park, set upon a hill, affords 180-degree views to the northwest, north, northeast, east and southeast, including that of Mount Desert Narrows, Frenchman Bay and its islands. As such, it is a popular viewing point for tourists.

Its entrance from Newport Drive, off Main Street, is marked by a water fountain, designed by Eric Sodderholtz. (Newport Drive is named for Newport House, a hotel which stood just south of the park between 1869 and 1938.)

In October 2013, The O'Reilly Factor sent one of its correspondents to Bar Harbor after the town council voted to remove a Wreaths Across America display that had been in the park since July 2011.

The park is a recommended viewpoint to watch the Fourth of July fireworks each year.

The park has a free Wi-Fi network.

Bar Harbor's Shore Path begins beside the park at Ells Pier and runs south along the shore of Frenchman Bay for about 0.7 miles (1.1 km).

== Agamont House ==
The park stands on the former site of Agamont House (sometimes called Agamont Hotel), which was built in 1840 by Tobias Roberts. It was expanded into a hotel — the town's first — in 1855. The building burned down in 1888.

== See also ==
- Village Green, Bar Harbor
