= Ben & Bill's Chocolate Emporium =

American ice cream parlor chain

Coordinates: 44.389715899°N 68.20452672°W

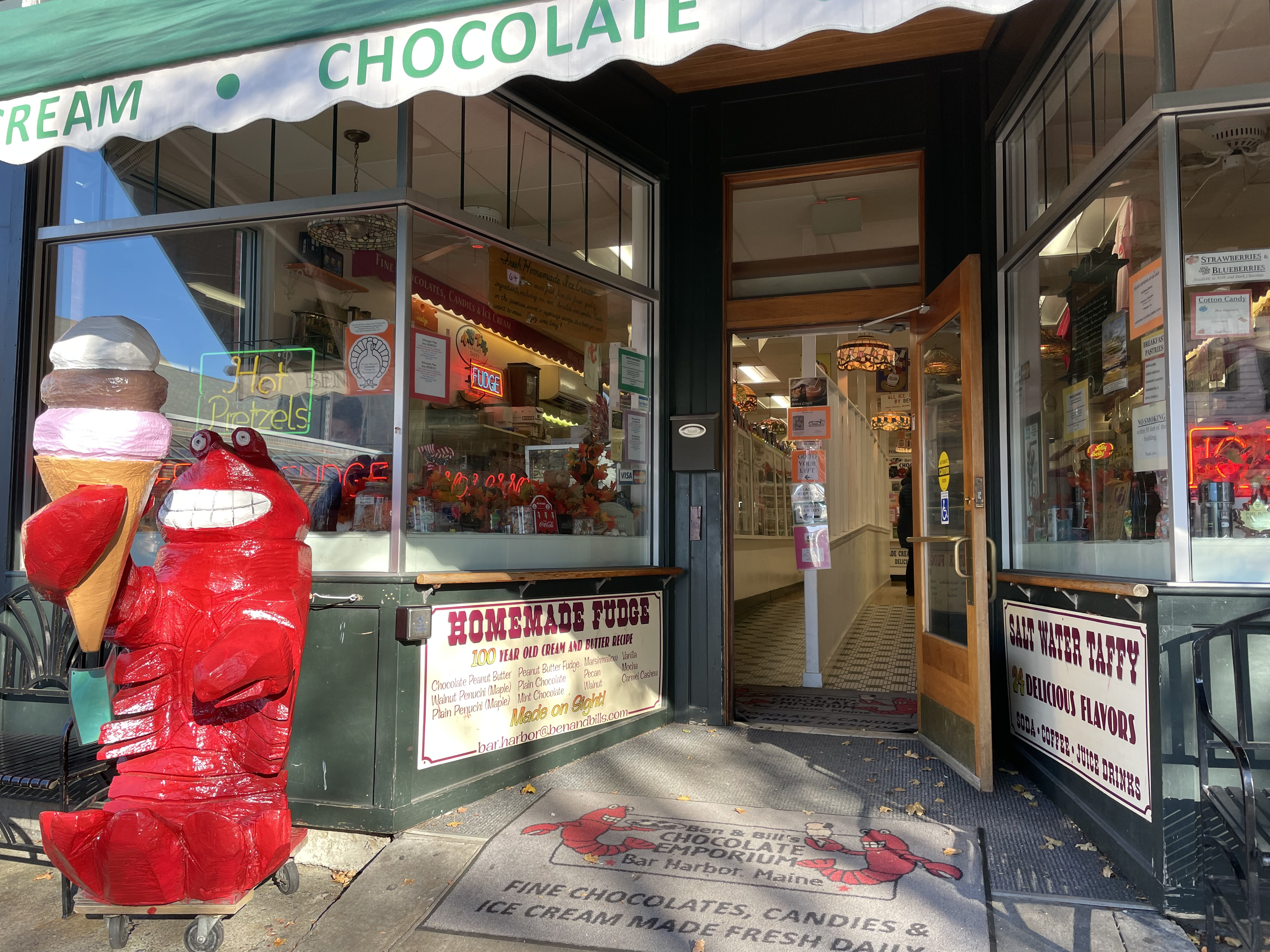
- The Bar Harbor storefront, 2021
- Formerly: Trahan's Candies (1956–1988)
- Company type: Ice-cream parlor
- Founded: 1956 (70 years ago)
- Founders: Paul Trahan; Mary Trahan
- Headquarters: 66 Main Street; Bar Harbor, Maine
- Number of locations: 2
- Owners: Ben Coggins (since 1988); William Coggins (since 1988)
- Website: benandbills.com

Ben & Bill's Chocolate Emporium is a chain of ice cream parlors and confectioners in New England, United States.

== History ==
The company was founded, as Trahan's Candies, in 1956 by Paul and Mary Trahan. Their original location was inside Ben Franklin's Store in Vineyard Haven on Martha's Vineyard, Massachusetts. Two years later, the Trahans opened their own retail location in the town of Oak Bluffs, Massachusetts. They expanded into the Massachusetts towns of Falmouth and Hyannis, operating during the summer months. They then opened two locations in Florida — in Palm Beach and West Palm Beach — which stayed open during the winter. Each location made its own candy and chocolates.

Other expansion locations opened and closed. One, on Main Street in Bar Harbor, Maine, opened in 1980 and is still in operation. After the sale of the Oak Bluffs store on Martha's Vineyard in 2004, it became the company's headquarters.

In 1983, the stores introduced ice cream to their products. The Bar Harbor location began with sixteen flavors, adding more as demand dictated. Today, that location has 64 hard-serve ice cream (including a lobster flavor, introduced in 1988) and twelve gelatos. The Bar Harbor location, at least, also offers vegan ice cream. The lobster flavor was created as a joke after a challenge from a customer, but it remained on the menu. It is made by folding chopped, cooked and buttered lobster meat into vanilla ice cream.

After 32 years in operation, the business was sold to the Trahans' nephews Ben and William Coggins, who renamed it Ben and Bill's Chocolate Emporium.

A location was opened in Northampton, Massachusetts, in 1991, followed three years later by the Oak Bluffs store. The Northampton store closed in 2017.

With an estimated 90% of its business sourced from out-of-state visitors, the Bar Harbor location launched a GoFundMe campaign during the COVID-19 pandemic, having seen their 2020 sales drop to 43% of that of the previous year.

== Current locations ==
- Oak Bluffs, Massachusetts
- Bar Harbor, Maine

== Appearances in popular culture ==
The Bar Harbor store is visited by Charlie Parker, the main character in John Connolly's The Killing Kind (2001), part of the Charlie Parker series. It is also visited by Jack in Jennifer Richard Jacobson's book Small as an Elephant (2011).

== Gallery ==
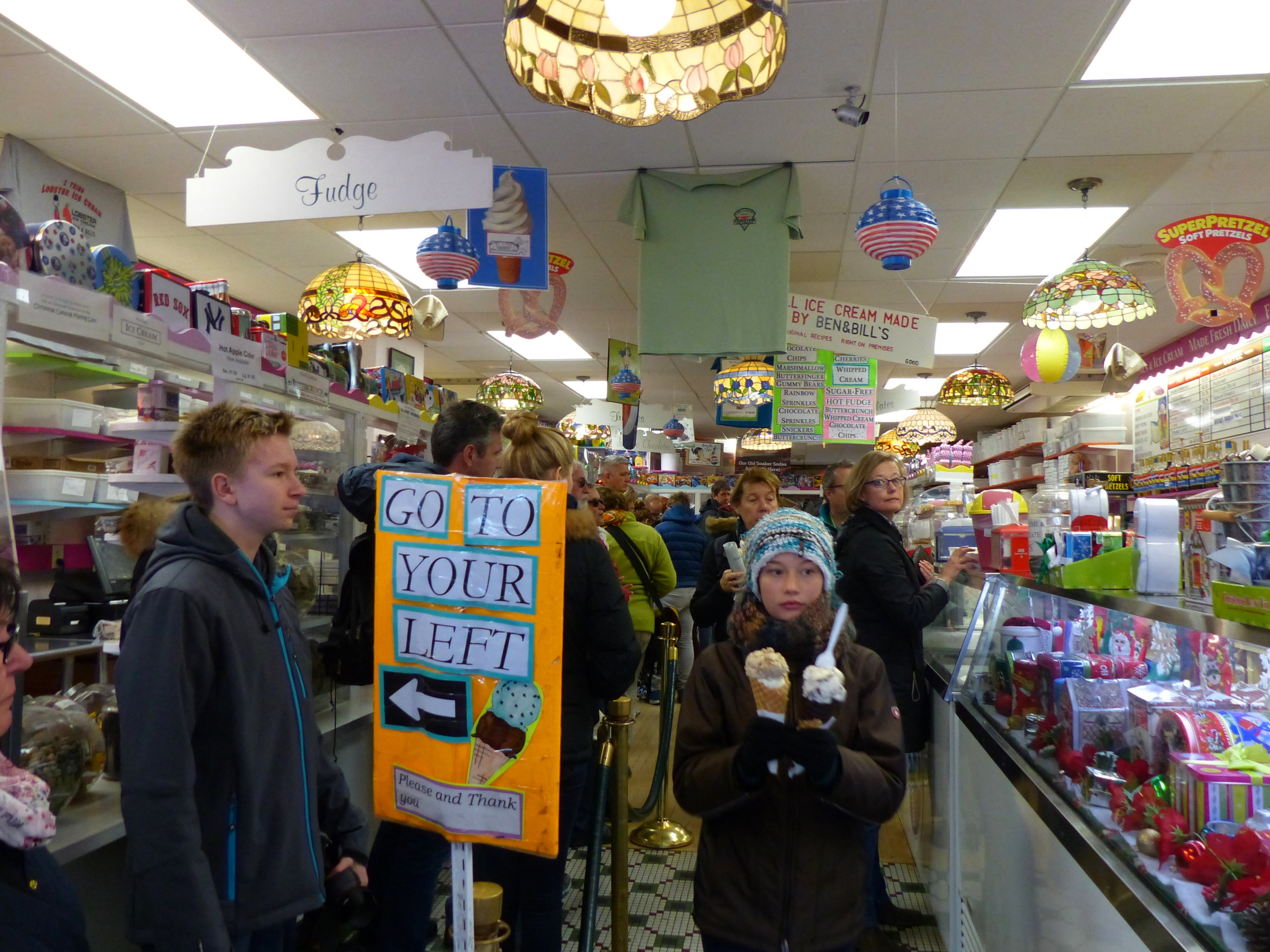
Inside the Bar Harbor location, 2015

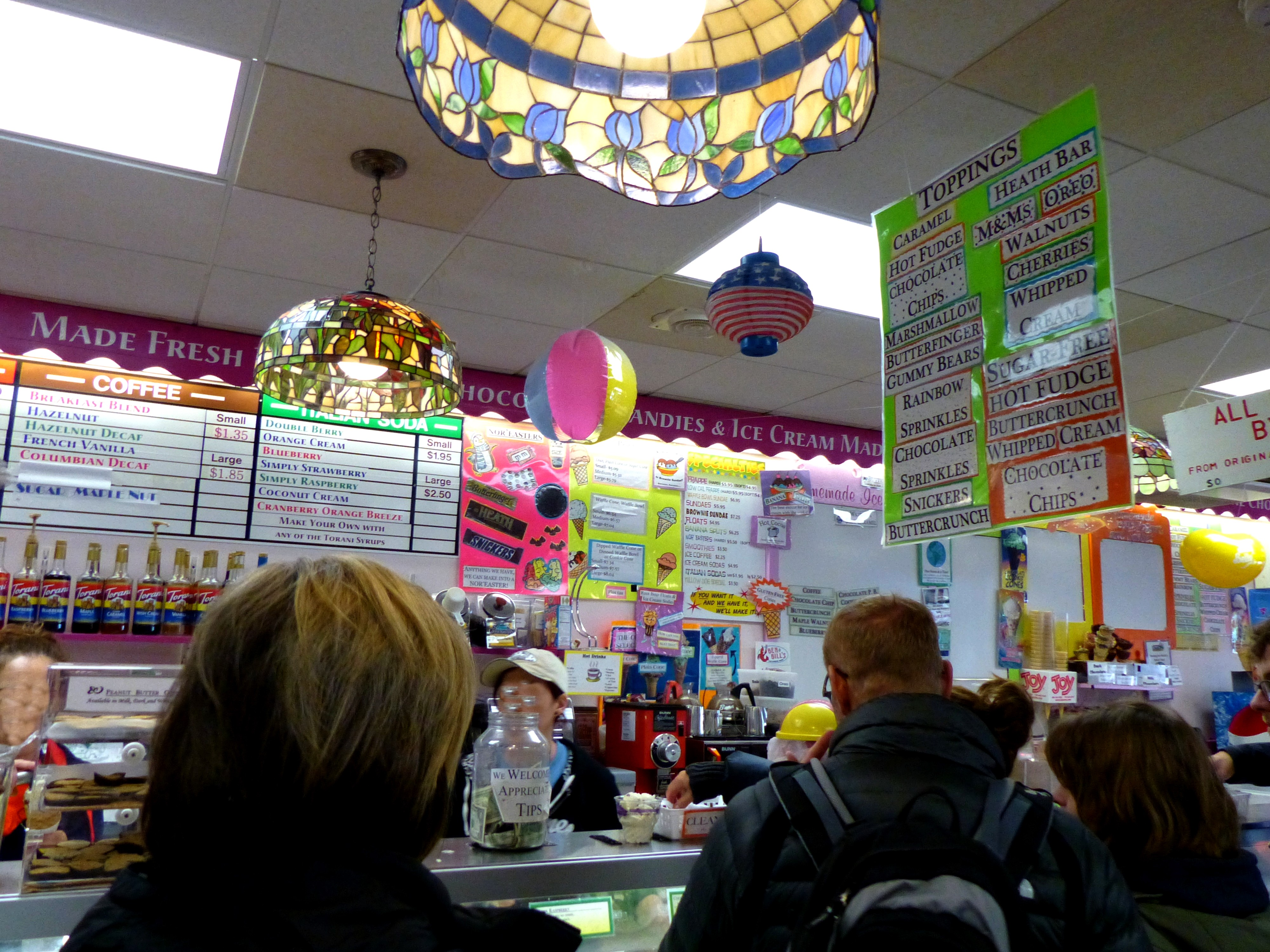
The right-hand side of the store
