= Island Explorer =

Bus system in Maine, US

- Founded: 1999
- Locale: Mount Desert Island, Maine
- Service area: Hancock County, Maine
- Service type: Bus service
- Routes: 10
- Destinations: Acadia National Park, Bar Harbor, Trenton, Schoodic Peninsula
- Fleet: 36 buses, 4 vans
- Fuel type: Propane
- Operator: Downeast Transportation
- Chief executive: Paul Murphy
- Website: http://www.exploreacadia.com

The Island Explorer is a seasonal bus system which provides fare-free transportation on and near Mount Desert Island in Maine, United States. It is operated by Downeast Transportation and is largely intended to serve visitors to Acadia National Park as a means to reduce area traffic within the park and in area communities, including the Schoodic Peninsula. It typically runs from mid-June through the beginning of October, departing from Kennebec Street to the west of Bar Harbor's Village Green. Operations began in 1999, and in 2019, the service carried over 647,000 passengers.

== Operations ==
The service began operations in 1999. Regular operations are funded from a variety of sources, including a dedicated portion of Acadia National Park entrance fees from the National Park Service, the Maine Department of Transportation, L.L. Bean, municipal governments, the group Friends of Acadia, as well as local businesses directly served by the service. L.L. Bean's contribution totals $4 million since 2002. To reduce pollution, the bus fleet is powered by propane. 21 new buses were purchased in 2019 to replace a portion of the fleet of 36, the purchase funded by the National Park Service and State of Maine. The service also has four vans and two bicycle trailers. The service typically hires 110 drivers a year. Buses carry 30 seated and 13 standing passengers.

Service is typically offered from June 23 through the beginning of October, with service on the Schoodic Peninsula beginning slightly earlier on Memorial Day. Since 1999, the service has carried 7.7 million passengers. It has prevented 41 tons of smog-causing pollutants and 27,000 tons of greenhouse gases from being released.

== COVID-19 ==
The service was cancelled in 2020 due to the COVID-19 pandemic, due to the difficulty of complying with social distancing measures imposed by the State of Maine. Those measures would have limited bus capacity to twelve people. Downeast Transportation, the operator, planned to resume limited service on fewer routes in 2021. Capacity was limited to 12 people, with every other row of seats vacant and only the members of the same group permitted to sit in the same row.

== See also ==
- Public transportation in Maine
