= Bar Harbor, Maine =

- Town
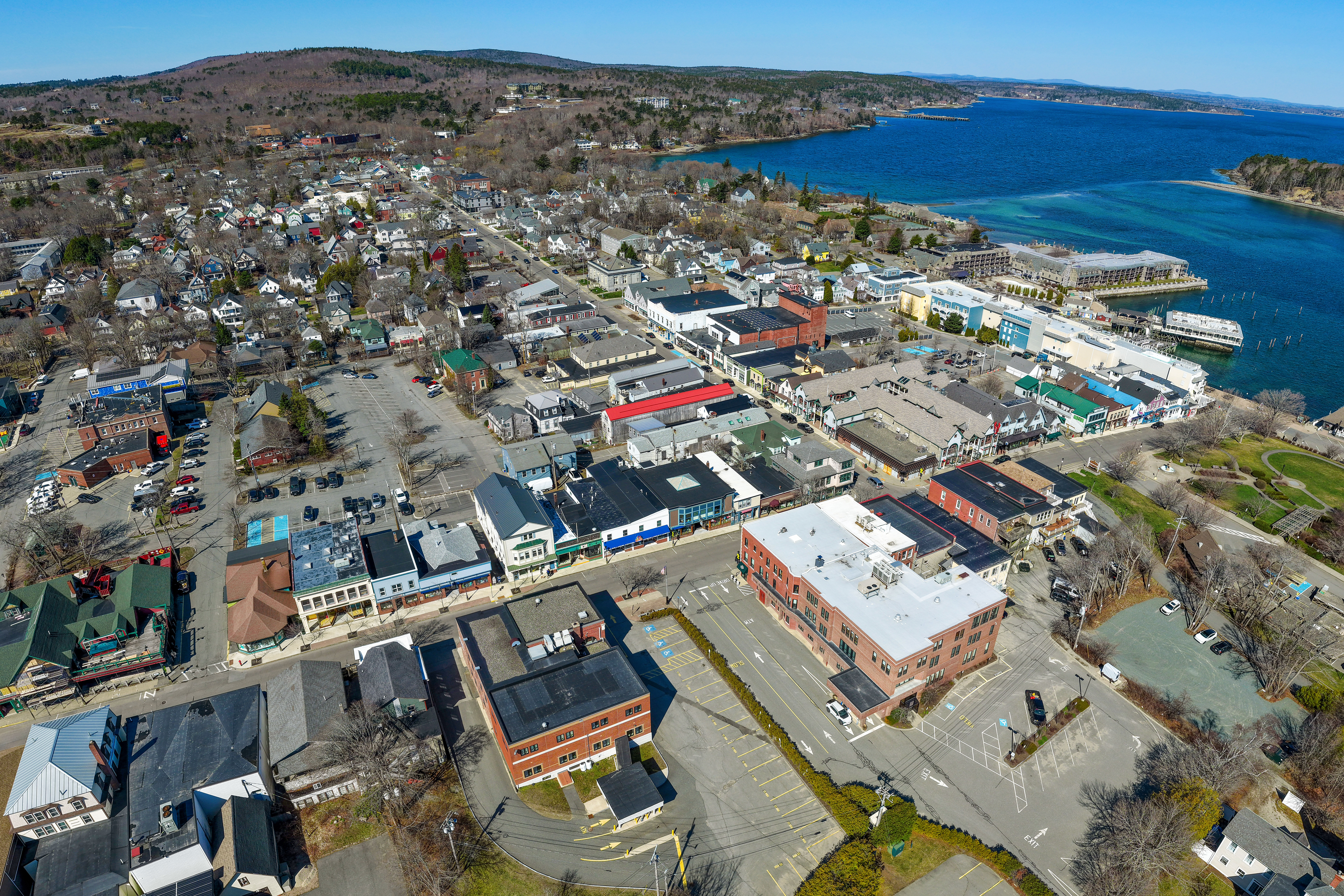
- Downtown

- Seal

- Location in Maine Location in the United States
- Coordinates: 44°23′08″N 68°16′30″W
- Country: United States
- State: Maine
- County: Hancock
- Settled: 1763
- Incorporated: February 23, 1796
- Villages: Eden (until March 3, 1918); Bar Harbor (from March 3, 1918); Hamilton Station; Hulls Cove; Indian Point; Red Rock Corner; Salsbury Cove; Town Hill

Government
  - Type: Council-Manager

Area
  - Total: 63.11 sq mi (163.45 km^{2})
  - Land: 42.24 sq mi (109.40 km^{2})
  - Water: 20.87 sq mi (54.05 km^{2})
- Elevation: 505 ft (154 m)

Population (2020)
  - Total: 5,089
  - Density: 120/sq mi (46.5/km^{2})
- Time zone: UTC−5 (Eastern (EST))
  - Summer (DST): UTC−4 (EDT)
- ZIP Code: 04609
- Area code: 207
- GNIS feature ID: 582341
- Website: www.barharbormaine.gov

Bar Harbor is a resort town on Mount Desert Island in Hancock County, Maine, United States. As of the 2020 census, its population is 5,089. The town is home to the College of the Atlantic, Jackson Laboratory, and MDI Biological Laboratory. During summer and fall seasons, it is a popular tourist destination.

Bar Harbor is also home to the largest parts of Acadia National Park, including Cadillac Mountain, the highest point within 25 miles (40 km) of the coastline of the Eastern United States.

From the mainland, Bar Harbor is accessible by road via Maine State Route 3. The island is directly accessible by air at Hancock County–Bar Harbor Airport, and by ferry from Winter Harbor, Maine, and Yarmouth, Nova Scotia.

== History ==
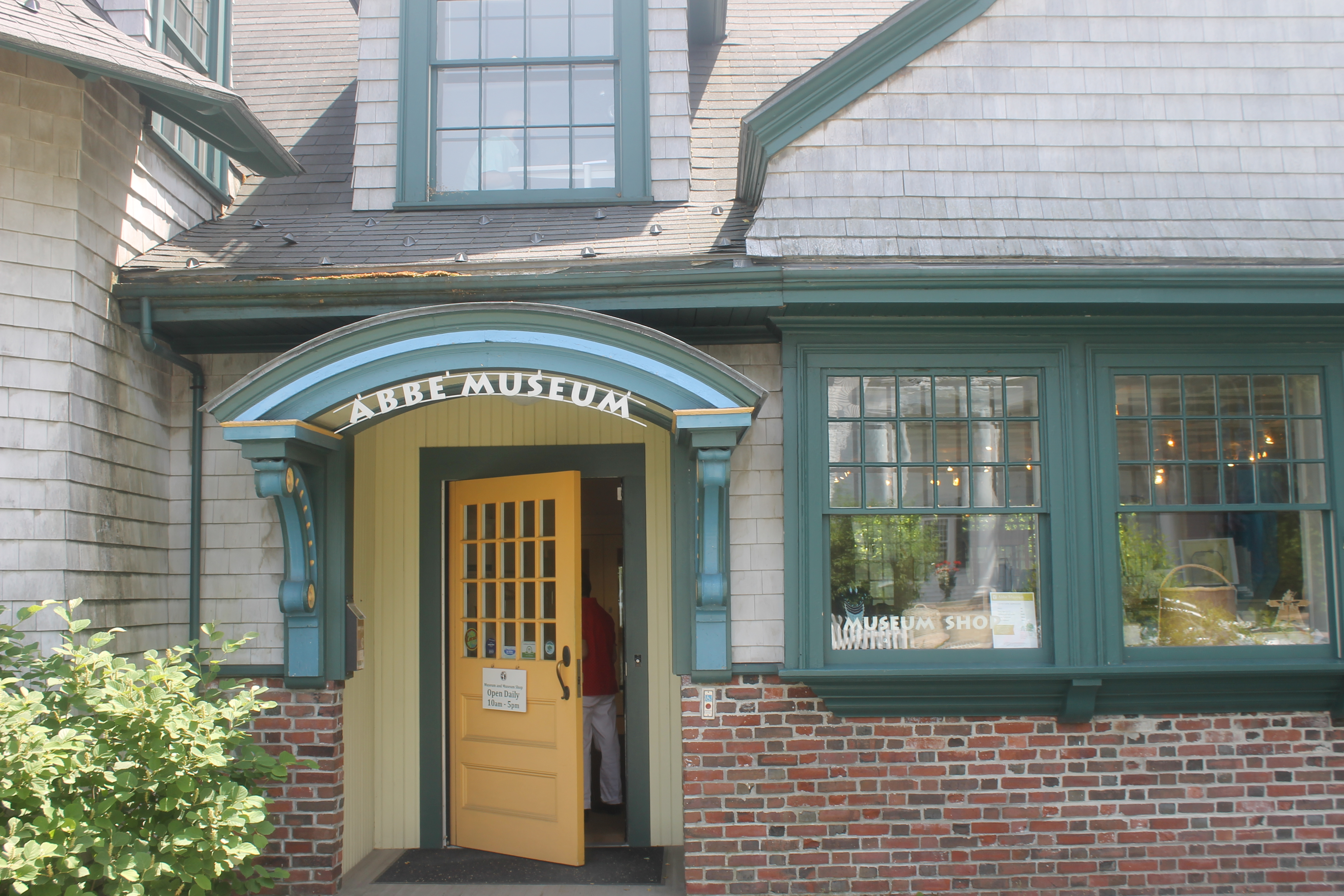
The Abbe Museum features the history and culture of Maine's native people, the Wabanaki.

The town of Bar Harbor was founded on the northeast shore of Mount Desert Island, which the Wabanaki Indians knew as Pemetic, meaning "range of mountains" or "mountains seen at a distance." The Wabanaki seasonally fish, hunt and gather berries, clams, and other shellfish in the area. They speak of Bar Harbor as Man-es-ayd'ik ("clam-gathering place") or Ah-bays'auk ("clambake place"), leaving great piles of shells as evidence of this abundance. In early September 1604, French explorer Samuel de Champlain ran aground on a rock ledge believed to be Egg Rock, just off Otter Cliffs, and when he came ashore to repair his boat he met local natives. Champlain named the island Isles des Monts Deserts, meaning "island of barren mountains"—now called Mount Desert Island, the largest island in Maine.

In 1761, Abraham Somes established the first European village on Mount Desert Island, naming it Somesville. Also named for him is Somes Sound, the only naturally occurring fjard on the East Coast of the US. Bar Harbor itself was incorporated as Eden on February 23, 1796.

Early industries included fishing, lumbering and shipbuilding. With the best soil on Mount Desert Island, it also developed agriculture, with a main focus on dairy. In the 1840s, its rugged maritime scenery attracted the Hudson River School and Luminism artists Thomas Cole, Frederic Edwin Church, William Hart and Fitz Henry Lane. Inspired by their paintings, journalists, sportsmen and "rusticators" followed. Agamont House, the first hotel in Eden, was established in 1855 by Tobias Roberts. Birch Point, the first summer estate, was built in 1868 for Alpheus Harding.

By 1880, there were 30 hotels, including the Mira Monte Inn, a historic landmark that survived a massive fire in 1947. Tourists were arriving by train and ferry to the Gilded Age resort that would rival Newport, Rhode Island. The rich and famous tried to outdo each other with entertaining and estates, often hiring landscape gardener and landscape architect Beatrix Farrand, a resident at local Reef Point Estate, to design their gardens. A glimpse of their lifestyles was available from the Shore Path, a coastal path skirting waterfront lawns. Yachting, garden parties at the Pot & Kettle Club, and carriage rides up Cadillac Mountain were popular diversions. Others enjoyed horse-racing at Robin Hood Park-Morrell Park. US President William Howard Taft played golf in 1910 at the Kebo Valley Golf Club. He was the last sitting president to visit the town until Barack Obama in July 2010.

On March 3, 1918, Eden was renamed Bar Harbor, after the sand bar, visible at low tide, which leads across to Bar Island and forms the rear of the harbor. The name would become synonymous with elite wealth. It was the birthplace of vice-president Nelson Rockefeller.

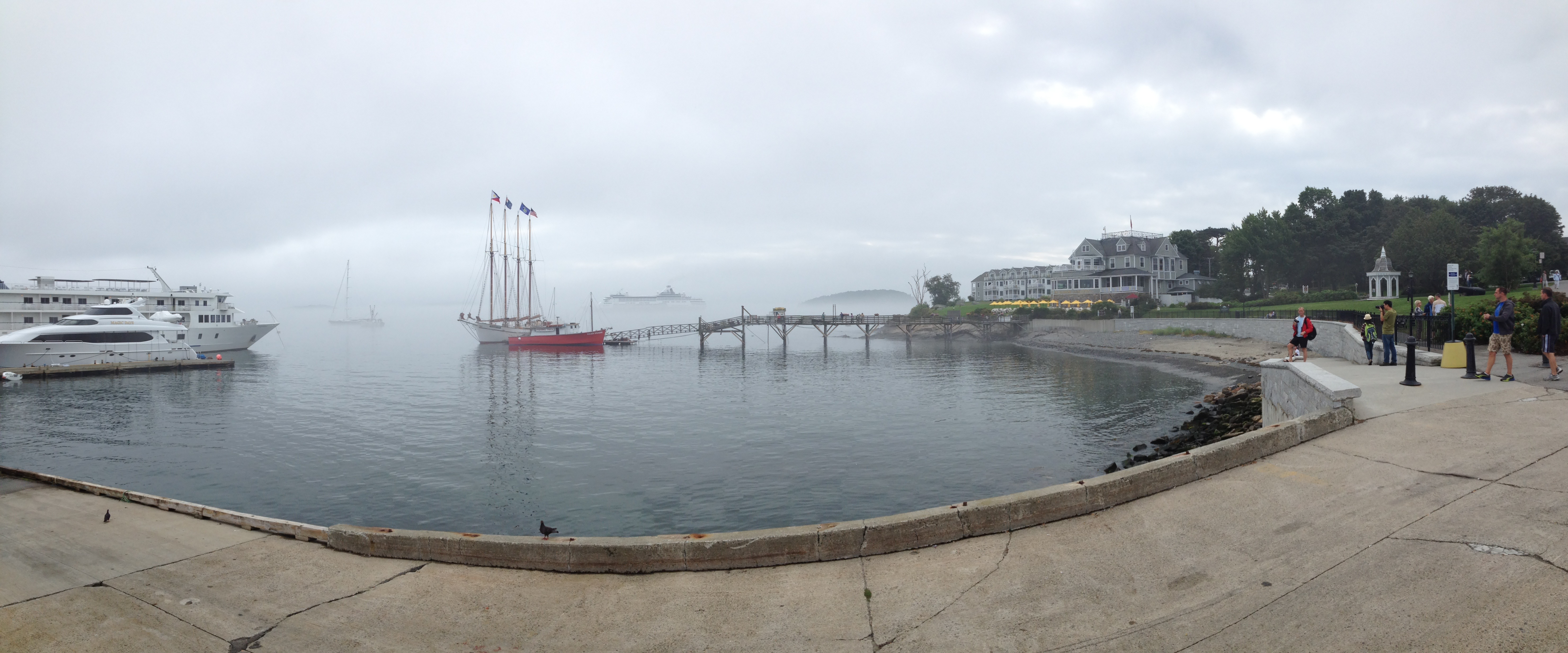
The four-masted schooner Margaret Todd. Bald Porcupine Island is beyond the pier and the Bar Harbor Inn is to the right.

Bar Harbor was also used for naval practices during World War II. More specifically, Bald Porcupine Island (one of the five Porcupine Islands) was used to as a target for live torpedoes. In October 1944, the submarine USS Piper (SS-409) fired 12 live torpedoes at the island. Of those fired, one failed to explode on the first attempt but was later detonated by the twelfth torpedo. In 1996, the U.S. Army Corps of Engineers surveyed all 30 acres of Bald Porcupine Island for unexploded ordnance. Nine were found.

Many influential people have called Bar Harbor home for at least part of the year. John D. Rockefeller Jr., son of John D. Rockefeller of Standard Oil Co., donated about one-third of the land in Acadia National Park and built the carriage roads that are used for hiking and biking. J. P. Morgan owned a house that is adjacent to the town. Cornelius Vanderbilt built "cottages" in Bar Harbor, while the Astor family owned hotels and cottages in Bar Harbor and the surrounding areas. Roxanne Quimby, co-founder and CEO of Burt's Bees, has a home near Bar Harbor. Martha Stewart owns property in nearby Seal Harbor and frequents Bar Harbor.

=== Mount Desert Island fire ===
In mid-October 1947, Maine experienced a severe drought, seeing only half of its usual rainfall. On October 17, sparks at a cranberry bog near Town Hill ignited a wildfire that intensified over the next ten days, due to strong winds that began on October 21, and it was not declared out until mid-November. This was one of several wildfires in the state that year. Nearly half the eastern side of Mount Desert Island burned, including 67 "cottages"—nearly one-third of the 222 cottages that stood at the time. (Many were empty or for sale; only 135 were occupied that summer.) Five historic grand hotels were also destroyed. These were Agamont House (Main Street), Hamor House (Main Street at Cottage Street), Belmont Hotel (Mount Desert and Kebo Streets), Malvern Hotel (Kebo Street) and the DeGregoire Hotel (Eden Street at West Street). The Building of Arts civic building, on Kebo Street at Cromwell Harbor Road, also burned.

Over 10,000 acres (4,000 hectares) of Acadia National Park were destroyed. The town's business district was spared, including Mount Desert Street, where several former summer homes within a historic district listed on the National Register of Historic Places operate as inns.

== Geography ==
According to the United States Census Bureau, the town has a total area of 63.11 square miles (163.45 km^{2}), of which 42.24 square miles (109.40 km^{2}) is land and 20.87 square miles (54.05 km^{2}) is water. Bar Harbor is situated on Frenchman Bay, with multiple smaller islands just offshore. Twice a day, at low tide, a sand bar (Bar Harbor's namesake) is exposed, linking the town to Bar Island.

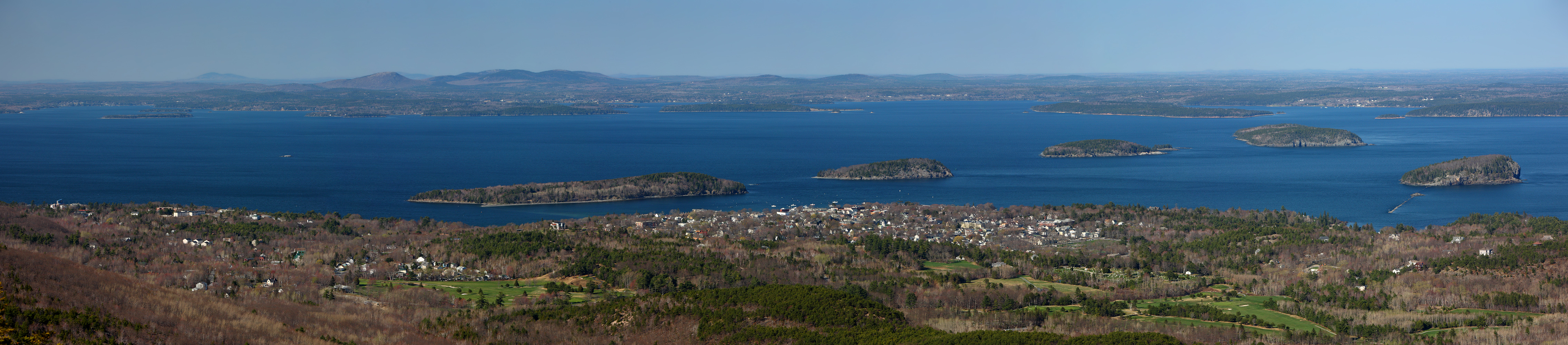
Frenchman Bay and islands and the area around the town of Bar Harbor viewed from Cadillac Mountain in Acadia National Park

=== Climate ===
This climatic region is typified by large seasonal temperature differences, with warm to hot (and often humid) summers and cold (sometimes severely cold) winters. According to the Köppen climate classification system, Bar Harbor has a humid continental climate, abbreviated "Dfb" on climate maps. Bar Harbor and Mount Desert Island are located near the coastline and surrounded by the North American continent to the northeast and southwest. This location, combined with prevailing winds that are not from the Atlantic, gives Bar Harbor a continental climate with very cold winters for an island location at such a low latitude.

Climate data for Bar Harbor, Maine
Month	Jan	Feb	Mar	Apr	May	Jun	Jul	Aug	Sep	Oct	Nov	Dec	Year
Record high °F (°C)	63 (17)	57 (14)	78 (26)	83 (28)	92 (33)	97 (36)	96 (36)	98 (37)	96 (36)	89 (32)	70 (21)	66 (19)	98 (37)
Mean daily maximum °F (°C)	31.4 (−0.3)	35.0 (1.7)	41.6 (5.3)	53.3 (11.8)	65.0 (18.3)	74.2 (23.4)	79.1 (26.2)	78.4 (25.8)	70.5 (21.4)	58.7 (14.8)	48.1 (8.9)	37.2 (2.9)	56.1 (13.4)
Daily mean °F (°C)	22.6 (−5.2)	26.1 (−3.3)	33.2 (0.7)	44.2 (6.8)	54.7 (12.6)	64.0 (17.8)	69.2 (20.7)	68.7 (20.4)	61.2 (16.2)	50.3 (10.2)	40.5 (4.7)	29.3 (−1.5)	47.1 (8.4)
Mean daily minimum °F (°C)	13.7 (−10.2)	17.2 (−8.2)	24.8 (−4.0)	35.0 (1.7)	44.5 (6.9)	53.7 (12.1)	59.3 (15.2)	58.9 (14.9)	52.0 (11.1)	42.0 (5.6)	33.0 (0.6)	21.3 (−5.9)	38.1 (3.4)
Record low °F (°C)	−20 (−29)	−21 (−29)	−9 (−23)	11 (−12)	22 (−6)	32 (0)	36 (2)	36 (2)	27 (−3)	20 (−7)	−3 (−19)	−21 (−29)	−21 (−29)
Average precipitation inches (mm)	4.9 (120)	4.4 (110)	5.4 (140)	4.8 (120)	4.6 (120)	4.1 (100)	3.5 (89)	3.3 (84)	4.5 (110)	5.3 (130)	6.5 (170)	5.5 (140)	56.7 (1,440)
Average snowfall inches (cm)	16.7 (42)	18.7 (47)	11.4 (29)	4.1 (10)	0.2 (0.51)	0 (0)	0 (0)	0 (0)	0 (0)	0.2 (0.51)	3.0 (7.6)	12.5 (32)	66.8 (170)
Average precipitation days	11	9	10	10	10	10	9	8	9	9	10	10	115
Source: Weatherbase

== Demographics ==
Historical population
Census	Pop.	Note	%±
1800	400		—
1810	657		64.3%
1820	764		16.3%
1830	957		25.3%
1840	1,054		10.1%
1850	1,127		6.9%
1860	1,247		10.6%
1870	1,195		−4.2%
1880	1,629		36.3%
1890	1,946		19.5%
1900	4,379		125.0%
1910	4,441		1.4%
1920	3,622		−18.4%
1930	4,486		23.9%
1940	4,378		−2.4%
1950	3,864		−11.7%
1960	3,807		−1.5%
1970	3,716		−2.4%
1980	4,124		11.0%
1990	4,443		7.7%
2000	4,820		8.5%
2010	5,235		8.6%
2020	5,089		−2.8%

=== 2010 census ===
As of the census of 2010, there were 5,235 people, 2,427 households, and 1,275 families residing in the town. The population density was 123.9 inhabitants per square mile (47.8/km^{2}). There were 3,495 housing units at an average density of 82.7 units per square mile (31.9 units/km^{2}). The racial makeup of the town was 94.7% White, 0.8% African American, 0.2% Native American, 2.8% Asian, 0.4% from other races, and 1.2% from two or more races. Hispanic or Latino of any race were 1.1% of the population.

There were 2,427 households, of which 22.0% had children under the age of 18 living with them, 42.8% were married couples living together, 6.8% had a female householder with no husband present, 3.0% had a male householder with no wife present, and 47.5% were non-families. 36.0% of all households were made up of individuals, and 14.6% had someone living alone who was 65 years of age or older. The average household size was 2.08 and the average family size was 2.70.

The median age in the town was 45.3 years. 17.3% of residents were under the age of 18; 10% were between the ages of 18 and 24; 22.4% were from 25 to 44; 32.3% were from 45 to 64; and 18.1% were 65 years of age or older. The gender makeup of the town was 46.3% male and 53.7% female.

=== 2000 census ===
As of the census of 2000, there were 4,820 people, 2,142 households, and 1,163 families residing in or near the town. The population density was 114.2 inhabitants per square mile (44.1/km^{2}). There were 2,805 housing units at an average density of 66.5 units per square mile (25.7 units/km^{2}). The racial makeup of the town was 97.88% White, 0.15% Black or African American, 0.21% Native American, 0.89% Asian, 0.08% from other races, and 0.79% from two or more races. Hispanic or Latino of any race were 0.62% of the population.

There were 2,142 households, out of which 24.5% had children under the age of 18 living with them, 44.5% were married couples living together, 6.4% had a female householder with no husband present, and 45.7% were non-families. 34.7% of all households were made up of individuals, and 13.3% had someone living alone who was 65 years of age or older. The average household size was 2.16 and the average family size was 2.78.

In and near the town, the population was spread out, with 19.8% under the age of 18, 9.0% from 18 to 24, 28.6% from 25 to 44, 26.6% from 45 to 64, and 16.1% who were 65 years of age or older. The median age was 41 years. For every 100 females, there were 87.5 males. For every 100 females age 18 and over, there were 82.7 males.

The median income for a household in or near the town was $37,481, and the median income for a family was $51,989. Males had a median income of $31,085 versus $25,417 for females. The per capita income for the area was $24,103. About 4.9% of families and 8.9% of the population were below the poverty line, including 6.7% of those under age 18 and 8.3% of those age 65 or over.

== Education ==
It is in the Bar Harbor School District, an elementary school district, and the Mount Desert Community School District (for secondary school). Conners Emerson School, founded in 1962, is located in Bar Harbor, serving students of grades K through 8.

Mount Desert Island High School serves the four towns of Mount Desert Island, plus the outlying islands of Swans Island and the town of Cranberry Isles. The school also serves students from towns such as Trenton, Hancock, Lamoine and Mariaville on the mainland.

The College of the Atlantic is located in Bar Harbor, on Route 3.

== Transportation ==
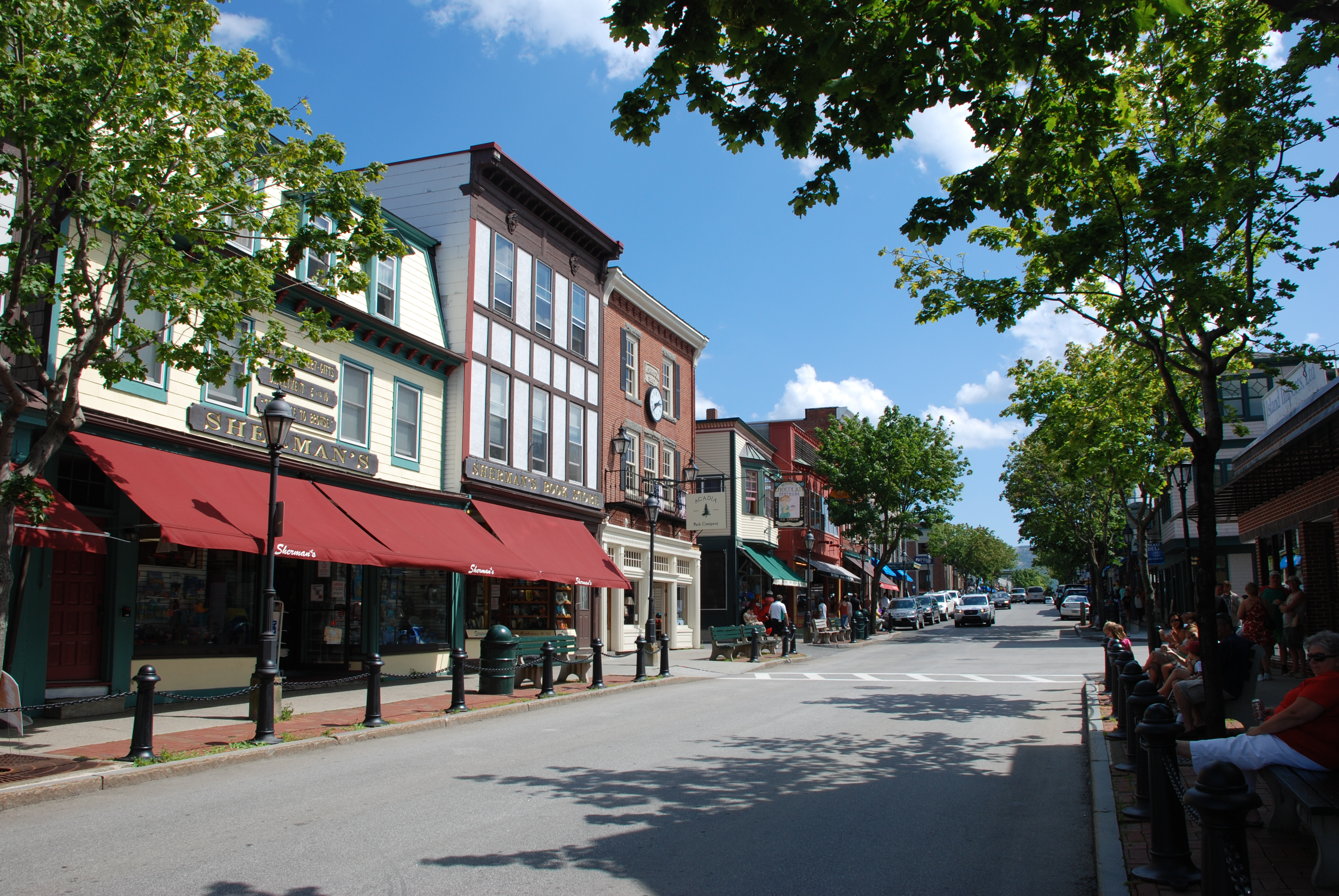
Main Street

Bar Harbor's main access road, from the north or south, is State Route 3, which is the coastal Eden Street taken from the Trenton Bridge. Upon entering the town limits from the north, Route 3 turns east onto Mount Desert Street, before turning south onto Main Street at Bar Harbor's Village Green. It then circumnavigates the eastern portion of Mount Desert Island. Two other streets link Route 3 to Main Street: West Street (the first visitors from the north see) and Cottage Street. Another principal road, Eagle Lake Road, leads west, from its intersection with Eden Street, Mount Desert Street and Kebo Street, into the national park.

The town is served by the Hancock County–Bar Harbor Airport, which provides year-round nonstop flights to Boston, Massachusetts.

Bar Harbor is the western terminus for The CAT, a high-speed summer ferry service across the Gulf of Maine to Yarmouth, Nova Scotia, Canada, operated by Bay Ferries. The 3.5-hour route returned to service in 2022 after previously operating from 1955 to 2009.

The Island Explorer is a seasonal bus service which provides fare-free transportation around Mount Desert Island and beyond. It is largely intended to serve visitors to Acadia as a means to reduce area traffic within the park and in area communities, including the Schoodic Peninsula. It typically runs from mid-June through the beginning of October. Operations began in 1999, and in 2019, the service carried over 647,000 passengers.

Downeast Windjammer Cruise Lines operates regular summer ferry service across Frenchman Bay between Bar Harbor and Winter Harbor.

== Tourism ==
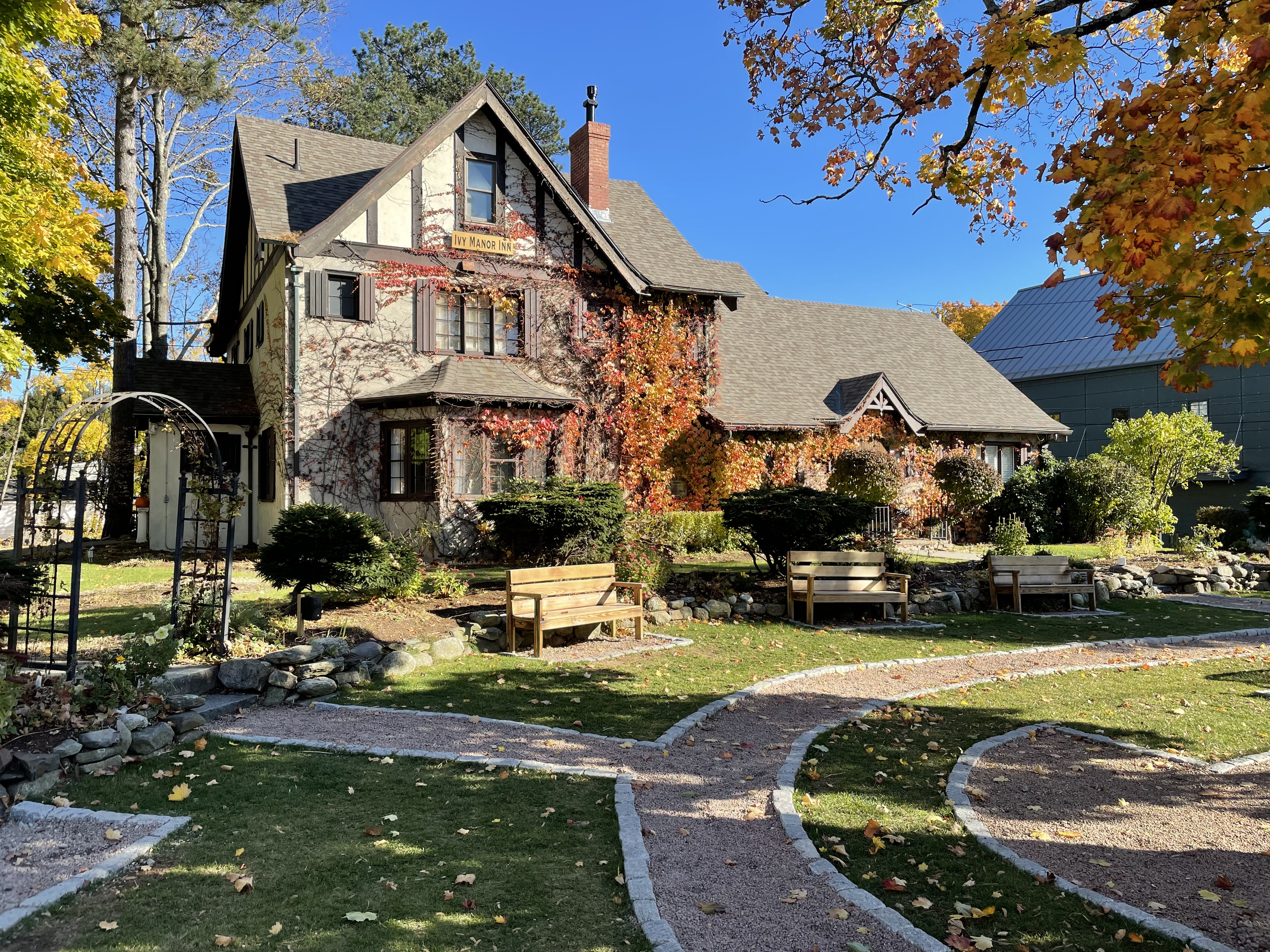
Ivy Manor Inn on Main Street, one of the town's many hotels

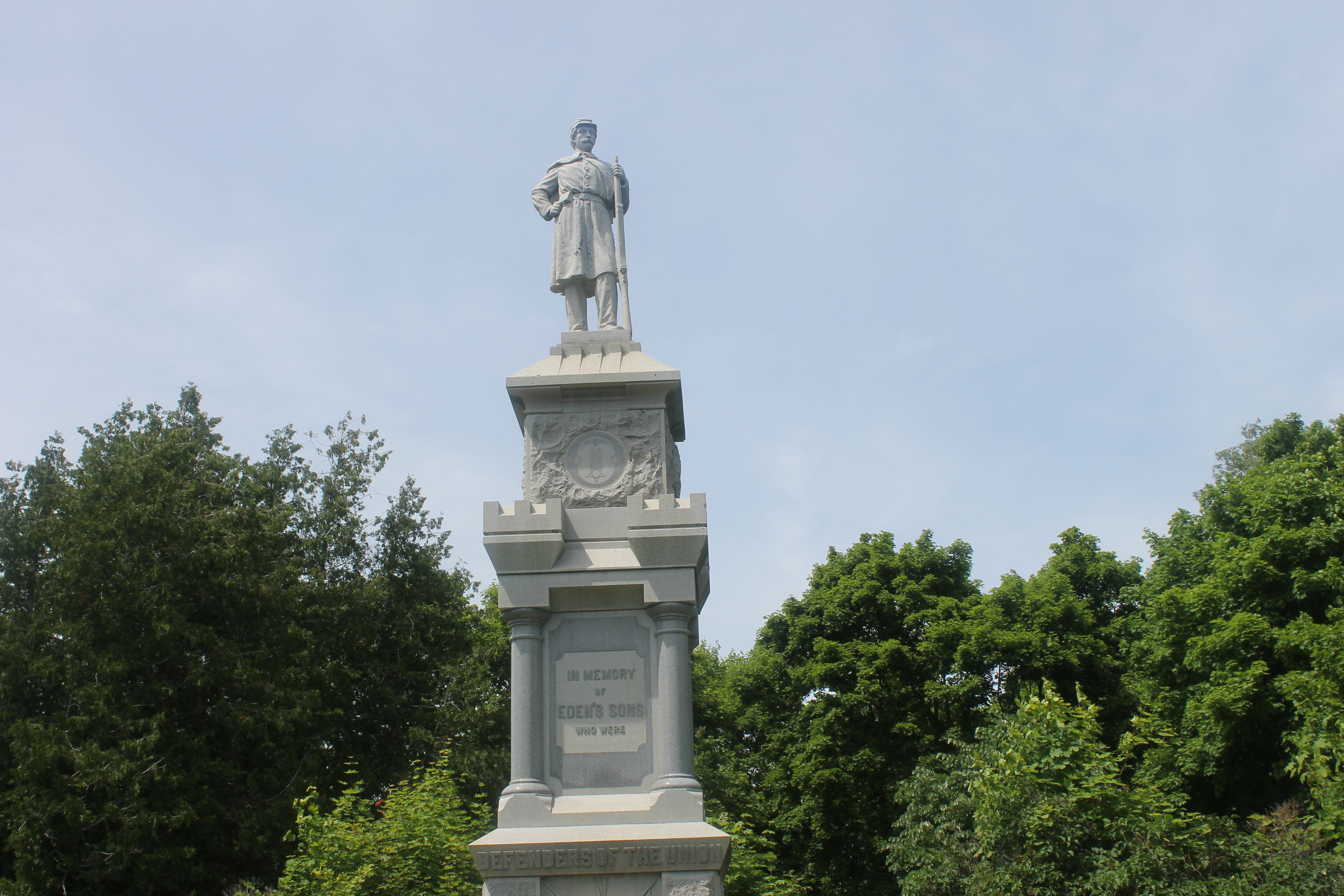
American Civil War monument "In memory of Eden's sons who were defenders of the Union." Eden was the original name of Bar Harbor, from 1796 to 1918.

The population of Bar Harbor, and Mount Desert Island generally, increases dramatically from May through October with "seasonal" residents and tourists. Many come for Acadia National Park, with its hiking trails and carriage roads, providing opportunities for biking, bird watching, and mountain climbing, with Cadillac Mountain being the highest point on the Atlantic seaboard.

Maritime tours are available, on a wide variety of boats, introducing visitors to puffins, whales, seals, seabirds, lighthouses, even lobsters, illustrating the working waterfront side of Bar Harbor.

The town has many historic houses, including large "cottages" along the shore, often converted to other uses today. To protect its housing supply for residents, citizens voted in 2021 to cap the number of vacation rentals in Bar Harbor.

In 2012, the American Planning Association named the Village Green one of their top ten Great Places in America for Public Spaces.

Cruise ships visit Bar Harbor from May through October (most in September and October), with 154 ship visits and more than 222,000 passengers in 2018. The forecast for 2019 was 176 ship visits and more than 254,000 passengers. In November 2022, concerned about crowding and overtourism, the citizens of Bar Harbor voted for a citizens' initiative to cap cruise ship disembarkations to 1,000 per day.

Bar Harbor also hosts many long-distance cyclists, as it is the eastern terminus of the Adventure Cycling Association's Northern Tier Bicycle Route (Anacortes, Washington, is the western terminus), and the northern terminus of its Atlantic Coast Bicycle Route (Key West, Florida, is the southern terminus).

Mount Desert Island Ice Cream, ranked among the best ice cream shops in the country, made the news in 2010 when President Obama and his family made a surprise visit for a treat. Ben & Bill's Chocolate Emporium, with its lobster-flavored ice cream and lobster statue, is a popular stop.

== Notable people ==
- James G. Blaine, Speaker of the House, Senator, and Secretary of State
- Verna Bloom, actress
- Charles Bolster, judge
- Les Brewer, co-founder of College of the Atlantic
- Dennis Damon, state senator (2002–2010)
- Henry F. Dimock, lawyer
- William E. Dodge Jr., businessperson
- Doris Doe, opera singer
- George Dorr, preservationist, lived at Compass Harbor
- Matthew Dunlap, Maine Secretary of State
- Joseph T. Edgar, Secretary of State of Maine and Speaker of the Maine House of Representatives
- Jill Goldthwait, state senator (1994–2002)
- William Jencks (1927–2007), organic chemist, biochemist, enzymologist, born in Bar Harbor
- Carrie Jones, novelist, podcaster
- David E. Kelley, television producer
- George A. Phillips, medical doctor and state legislator
- Shirley Povich, sports columnist and reporter for The Washington Post
- Esther Ralston, actress
- David Rockefeller, banker
- Nelson Rockefeller, businessman, governor of New York (1959–1973), Vice President of the United States (1974–1977)
- Jennifer Skiff, author, journalist, television producer
- George Davis Snell, Nobel Prize winning geneticist
- Marguerite Yourcenar, novelist and essayist
