= Henry B Bolster =

American politician

- Born: Baruch Bolster, Jr; June 8, 1792; Stoddard, New Hampshire, U.S.
- Died: July 21, 1859 (aged 67); New York City, U.S.
- Resting place: Greenwood Cemetery
- Occupations: Entrepreneur & Politician
- Political party: Whig Party
- Spouse(s): Elizabeth Newhall (m. 1815–1818 her death); Sarah Maria Chilson (m 1822–1851 her death)

Henry B Bolster (1792–1859) was a politically active entrepreneur in New York City during the early to mid 19th century. He was born in New Hampshire to an American family with roots back to the 17th century. His father was a Revolutionary War and The War of 1812 Veteran rising to the rank of Captain. Henry served as the Superintendent of Paving for the City of New York as well as was elected in two different Wards of Manhattan to the office of Assistant Alderman therefore served on the Common Council. Henry also was the original founder of a stage coach line that made him a wealthy man. Because of his wealth, he was an investor in several other business adventures including Insurance and Banking.

== Birth and early years ==
He was born on 8 June 1792 at Stoddard, Cheshire Co., NH. He was the son of Baruch Bolster and Anna Loveland. Henry moved to New Haven CT. There he served in the War of 1812 and rose to the rank of captain. He then moved to New York City around 1815.

=== Name issues ===
Most early records and documentation refer to Henry B Bolster as Baruch (or Barack, Barck, etc.) Bolster. There are numerous errors with the spelling his unusual first name. Henry B Bolster may have been born Baruch Bolster Jr and later added the Henry to his name to be Henry Baruch Bolster. All references made to Baruch Bolster born 1792 is the same person who later became known as Henry B Bolster. The evidence is overwhelming.

== New York City ==
Henry first married Elizabeth Newhall in 1815. She was from New Haven. She died of Typhoid Fever in 1818.

Marriage Announcement

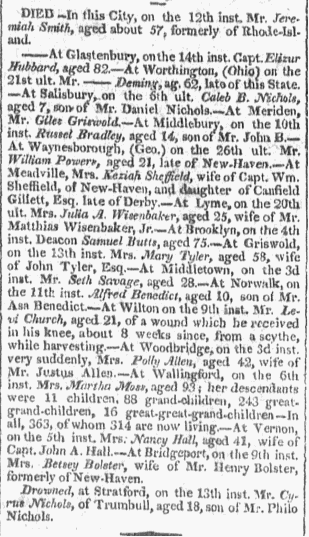
Death Notice (Henry Bolster Reference)

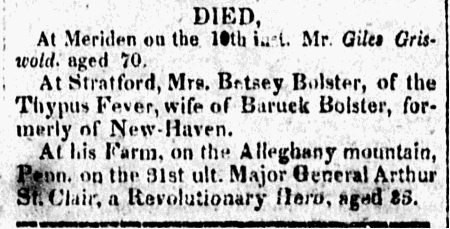
Death Notice (Baruch Reference)

He then married Sarah Maria Chilson, daughter of Asaph Chilson and Hestor Cornell on Feb 28, 1822 in New York City. He lived at 39 W 43rd Street, Manhattan.

=== Politics ===
In 1835, he was a Grocer.

Henry was an active member of the Whig Party. An article that appeared on June 6, 1839, in the Hudson River Chronicle discusses the Loco-Focoism as Henry was fired as Superintendent of Pavements for the City of New York as a result of a shift of the political power in charge.

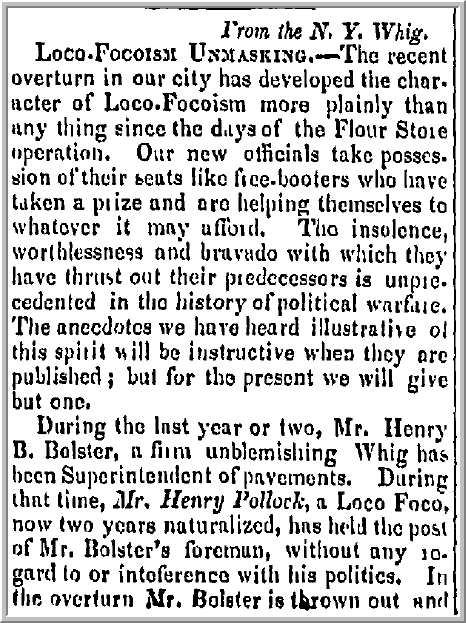
Part 1

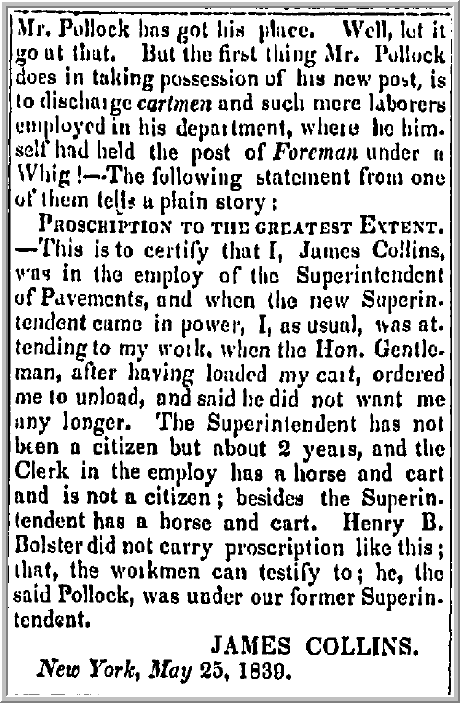
Part 2

Another article appeared in The Hudson River Chronicle, December 17, 1839 that discusses the Whig General Committee's approval of their delegates to the Convention and states Henry was approved as one of several vice-presidents of the Whigs.

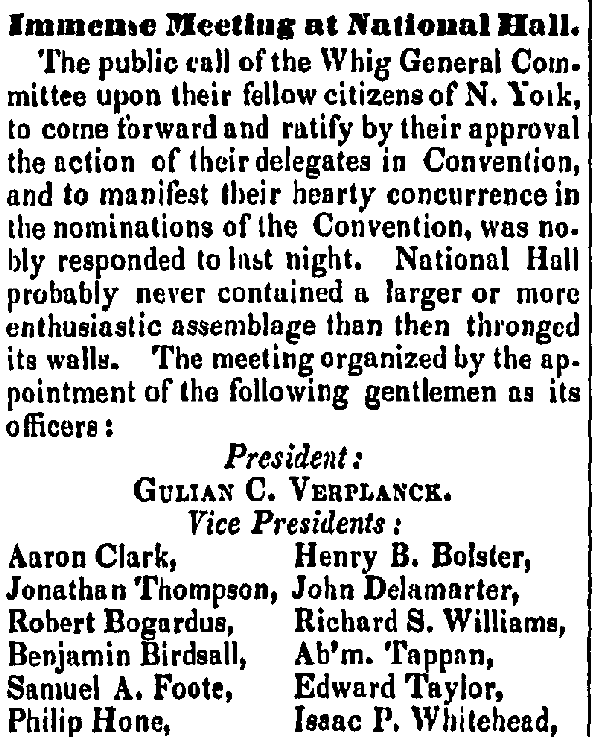
Part 1

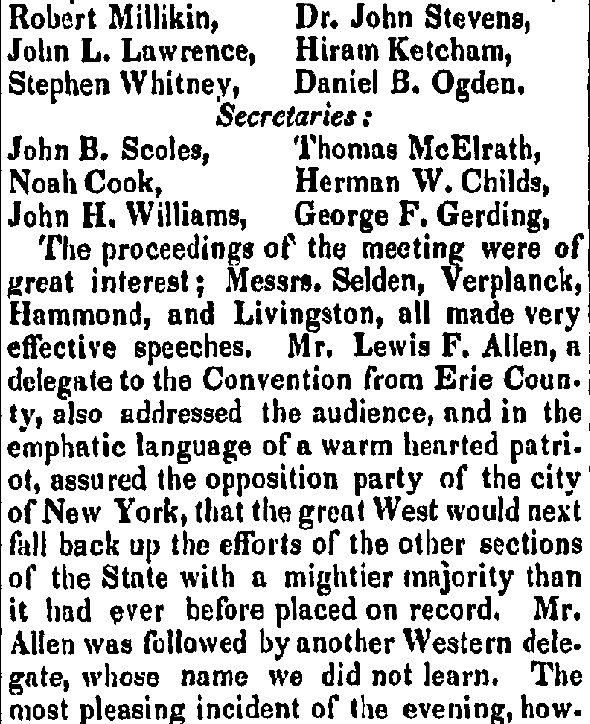
Part 2

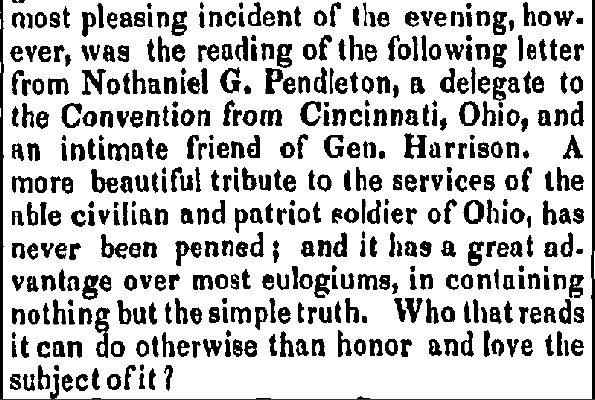
Part 3

Bolster, Henry B. (Grocer), Assistant Alderman, Eleventh Ward, 1827. Assistant Alderman, Sixteenth Ward, 1851.

Henry was a Trustee for the Knickerbocker Savings Bank in 1852 and a Director for the St Nicholas Insurance Company in 1853.

St Nicholas Fire Insurance Company Ad

Knickerbocker Savings Bank Ad

=== Stage coach/Omnibus business ===
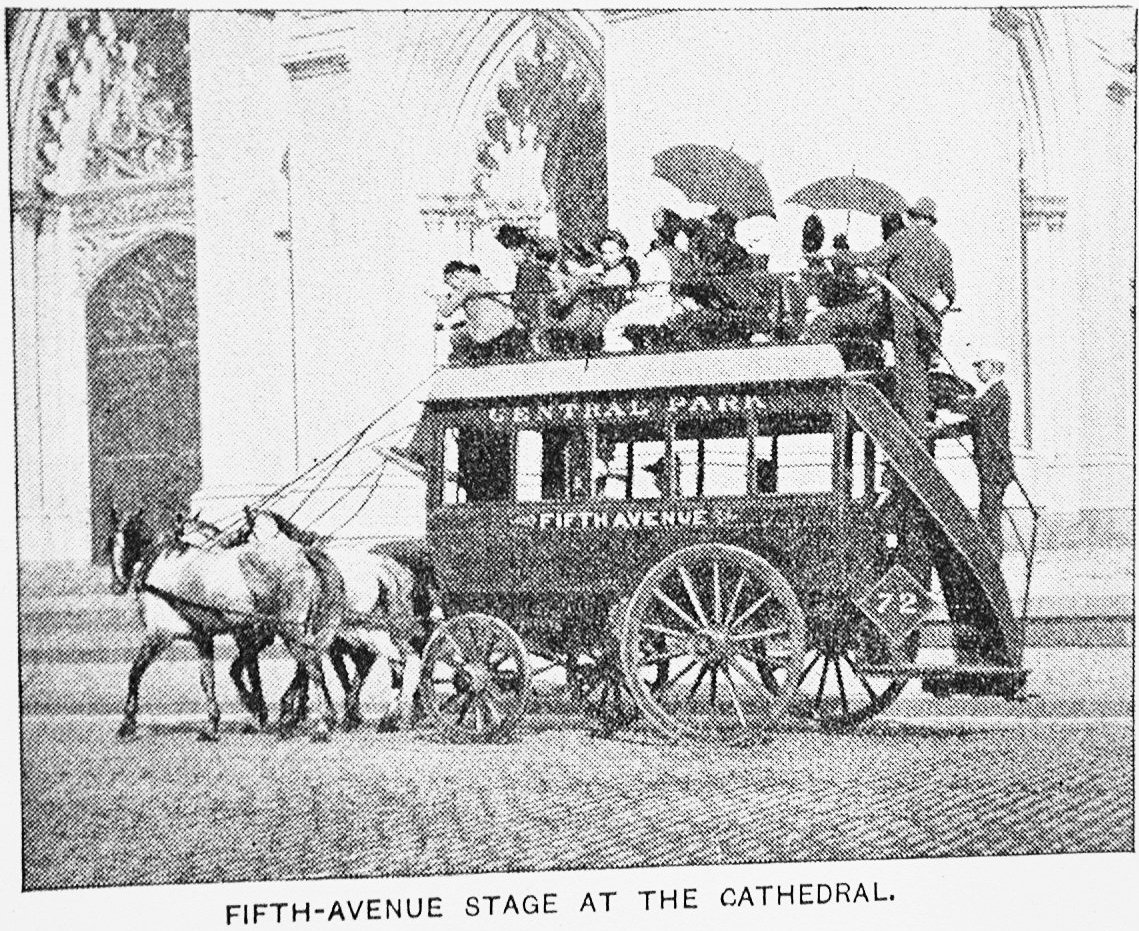
The Fifth Avenue Stage Line

Henry B. Bolster, along with his son Henry Clay Bolster, and his son-in-law, Samuel Wakeman Andrews, started his Stage Coach business in 1846. In the 1850 census, the Bolsters are both listed as Stage Proprietors. It looks like Samuel didn't work for the business directly until the early 1850s (according to his obit and the 1850 census that lists his occupation as Dry Goods). Henry Clay Bolster died in 1854. The business was called Bolster & Andrews and referred to as the Empire Line.

Simeon Mace Andrews returned from San Francisco after obtaining a small fortune from the gold rush in the 1850s. He bought into the business along with his two other brothers Benjamin Clark Andrews and Charles Simeon Andrews and the business was called Bolster, Andrews, & McDonald.

After Henry Bolster's death in 1859, the firm was called S.W. & S.M. Andrews & McDonald. Simeon and Samuel Andrews were the majority owners along with Grant McDonald (New York City Directory, 1869: McDonald John Grant, stages, 23 W. 43d, h 41 W. 42d). Grant McDonald dies in the 1871 and the name of the business was then S.W. & S.M. Andrews. In the 1880 census, all four Andrews brothers occupations were listed as Stage Proprietors.

On Ancestry.com, the following was documented about this stage line:

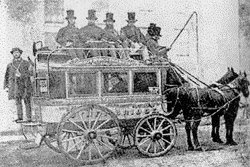

Henry Bolster business is Omnibus business @ 23 W. 43rd St N.Y. Route from there to Fulton Ferry. Omnibus firm in 1852 was Bolster, Andrews & McDonald, changed to S.W. & S.M. Andrews & McDonald, latter died in 1871 leaving it S.W. & S.M. Andrews. They had 450 horses on this line.

The business and stables were located at 23 west 43rd Street, Manhattan.

The business was sold in 1885 to the Broadway Surface Railroad Company as were all of the stage lines in New York City. Here is a story from the New York Times July 11, 1885 telling of the auctioning of the old equipment:

Selling The Old Stages Article

After this business was sold, another enterprise was started by unrelated individuals that was called the Fifth Avenue Stage Line which was a corporation. This business was eventually taken over by the City of New York.

Their route lay from Sixth Avenue and Fourteenth Street, through Ninth to and down Broadway.

On The EarlyRepublic.net website, a reference to this business was written as follows - which documents the initial purchase of the stage line by Samuel Andrews and "another":

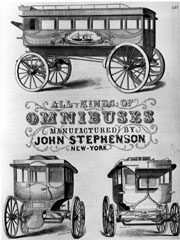

Before closing these "Reminiscences," it is pertinent to them to put on record a few illustrations of the passenger street travel of the preceding period. In connection, then, with the notices of the primitive stage routes given in the early chapters, the following are added: In 1830 there was established an irregular line of stages (omnibuses) between Bleecker Street and the Bowling Green, and occasionally a passenger could have himself carried some distance above Bleecker Street. In like manner, so late as 1836, Asa Hall and Kipp & Brown, of the Greenwich lines, had small stages ("carryalls" they were termed), in which passengers were transferred from Charles Street to their destination within the limit of Twentythird Street and Seventh Avenue. In 1845 this Broadway line was purchased by John Marshall, who extended the service from Corporal Thompson's (Twentythird Street and Fifth Avenue) through Fifth Avenue to Thirteenth Street, thence through University Place to Eleventh Street, then to Broadway, through Broadway to Fulton Street, and then to the Brooklyn Ferry. 'In 1846 Samuel NV.[sic.] Andrews, in company with another, bought the line, consisting of less than twenty stages, increased soon after to thirty.'

== Family ==
Henry and Sarah Bolster had 10 children in all. They were:

Hester Ann Bolster (1824-abt 1905) married James Andrews (?-1848) in 1844. She then married a Robert H. Shannon. Robert was friends with Ulysses S. Grant. Hester was living with her son in NJ in the 1900 census.

Children

1. Charles Wilmot Shannon (1853-1861)
2. Harry C Shannon (1856- ) married Daisy Talcott Coolidge
3. Nellie Andrews Shannon (1858-1861)
4. Robert I Shannon (1862-1890)
5. Herbert H Shannon (1864- ) married Mary N Morris

Eliza Jean Bolster (1825–1920) married Henry H Butler (1814–1888) in 1844. Henry H Butler was born on Staten Island to Capt. Henry Butler (1791–1864) and Magdalena Ellis (1791–1814). He was 2nd Cousin to Cornelius Vanderbilt from his mother's side. Eliza and Henry and most of their family members are buried in Moravian Cemetery at New Dorp on Staten Island.

Children

1. Cornelia J Butler (1845-1929) married John H Burgher
2. James Henry Butler (1847- )
3. Sarah Maria Butler (1849-1917) married George A Burgher
4. George Washington Butler (1851-1934)
5. Ella Frances Butler (1853-1888) married George Henry Prier
6. Emilie Augusta Butler (1856-1920) married Alexander C Bragaw
7. Simeon Andrews Butler (1858-1943) married Ella Gertrude Brown
8. Fanny Butler (1866-1875)

Henry Clay Bolster (1827–1854) married Mary Jane Whitting in 1853. Henry died not to long after his marriage and didn't have any children.

Naomi Maria Bolster (1829–1897) married Samuel Wakeman Andrews Sr. (1823–1897) in 1848.

Children

1. Alica Maria Andrews (1854-1907) married Milton L Williams
2. Julia Bolster Andrews (1857-1893) married William Edgar Johnson
3. Samuel Wakeman Andrews (1866-1935) married Harriet Hammond

Daniel Webster Bolster (1832–1836).

Mary Ellen Bolster (1836–1903) married Simeon Mace Andrews (1825–1891) in 1857.

Children

1. Ella Bolster Andrews (1864- ) married Everett W Little
2. Grace Andrews (1871-1873)

George Washington Bolster (1833–1891) married Levantia S Carpenter (1859–1879). He was a Civil War veteran.

Children

1. Samuel A Bolster (1875-1886)
2. George W Bolster (1877- )

William Seward Bolster (1839–1842).

Francis Augusta Bolster (1842–1908) married Thomas A Smith in 1867. She was a school teacher in New York.

Sarah Emily Bolster (1845) "Sick and baptized at the residence of the parents".

== Death ==
Henry died on July 21, 1859.

=== Obituary ===
Brooklyn Papers please copy;
Bolster- In this city on Thursday evening, July 21, Henry B. Bolster, Ex Assistant Alderman of the XIth and XVIth Wards, aged 67 years, 1 month and 13 days. The funeral will take place on Sunday the 24th inst at 1 o'clock PM from his late residence, No 33 West 43d St. His remains will be taken to Greenwood Cemetery. His friends and those of his son George W. Bolster and his sons in law, Samuel W. Andrews, Simeon M. Andrews, Henry H. Butler, and Robert H. Shannon are respectfully invited to attend without further notice.
