= Charles Bolster =

American judge

Charles Stephen Bolster (1894–1993) was an American judge at the Middlesex Superior Court in East Cambridge, Massachusetts, and a long-time resident of Southport Island, Maine who is best known for his involvement in the case of the Boston Strangler. He graduated from Harvard College in 1915 and Harvard Law School in 1920.

Judge Bolster was a respected but undistinguished judge who was known to be unapologetically fair toward the defense despite being an arch-conservative in an extremely liberal state.

== The Boston Strangler ==
Judge Bolster oversaw one of the Boston Strangler cases (as it was later concluded that the murders were likely committed by multiple individuals) beginning November 7, 1963. On the morning of November 22, Judge Bolster addressed the jury.

Now I have a very sad duty, gentlemen, I don't know whether you have heard. Early this afternoon one or more assassins in Texas, apparently from high up in a building, fired shots at some of our officials. They hit the president, the vice president and the Governor of Texas, and the president, early this afternoon, died. I ask everyone in the room to rise. I thought fast. I am willing to take the responsibility. You have been here almost three weeks. I venture to think that if the president were here ... he would do what I am doing. We are going ahead, but we are going ahead in a thoughtful sorrow about what has transpired. I have watched you gentlemen, and I think you are men of sufficient mental integrity not to let this influence you in any way in the decision of this case. This case is on its own evidence and on the arguments that have been ably presented to you, and so we are going forward. And will you please make every effort to be sure that your decision in this case is in no way tainted by the national disaster that has struck us. So you may retire, Mr. Foreman, and gentlemen, and we start at 8:30 in the morning.

The following day, Roy Smith was convicted. Supposedly, a large number of jurors were from Kennedy's original congressional district and some were crying. After the JFK assassination, most judges suspended juries. Saying that the assassination announcement and juries grief caused the guilty verdict, the defense attempted to appeal.

Well, what I believe happened is that Judge Bolster collapsed the entire case by his remarks to -- his prejudicial remarks to the jury after the close of the -- closing argument where Dick Kelley -- the judge inappropriately informed the jury that the president had been shot, that the vice president had been shot, and that the case was going to continue. Defense Attorney Beryl Cohen

== Bolster Day ==
Each year on Southport Island, near Boothbay Harbor, Maine, The Southport Island Association hosts Bolster Day in memory of the judge.

== Membership ==
In 1970 Judge Bolster became a member of the New Hampshire Society of the Cincinnati by right of his descent from Surgeon's Mate Timothy Hall of the 5th Massachusetts Infantry Regiment.
