= Panama at the 2019 Pan American Games =

- IOC code: PAN
- NOC: Comité Olímpico de Panamá

in Lima, Peru 26 July–11 August 2019
- Competitors: 84 in 18 sports
- Flag bearer: Carolena Carstens (opening)
- Medals Ranked 28th: Gold 0 Silver 0 Bronze 4 Total 4

Pan American Games appearances (overview)
- 1951; 1955; 1959; 1963; 1967; 1971; 1975; 1979; 1983; 1987; 1991; 1995; 1999; 2003; 2007; 2011; 2015; 2019; 2023; 2027

Panama competed at the 2019 Pan American Games in Lima, Peru from July 26 to August 11, 2019.

A total of 84 athletes (46 men and 38 women) were named to the Panamanian team, marking the largest delegation the country has ever sent to the Pan American Games.

On July 5, 2019, athlete Alonso Edward was named as the country's flag bearer during the opening ceremony. However, it was later announced taekwondo athlete Carolena Carstens would carry the flag, as Edward would not be in Lima for the opening ceremony.

Panama won four medals at these edition of the games, ranking 28th overall. The four medals marked the most won at a single edition of the games for the country since 1987.

== Competitors ==
The following is the list of number of competitors (per gender) participating at the games per sport/discipline.

Sport	Men	Women	Total
Athletics (track and field)	3	5	8
Badminton	1	1	2
Bowling	2	0	2
Boxing	1	1	2
Fencing	0	1	1
Football	18	18	36
Golf	2	1	3
Judo	2	2	4
Karate	1	1	2
Modern pentathlon	1	0	1
Shooting	5	0	5
Surfing	0	1	1
Swimming	4	5	9
Taekwondo	0	1	1
Triathlon	2	0	2
Weightlifting	2	1	3
Wrestling	1	0	1
Total	46	38	84

== Medalists ==
The following competitors from Panama won medals at the games. In the by discipline sections below, medalists' names are bolded.

Medal	Name	Sport	Event	Date
Bronze	Alvis Almendra	Wrestling	Men's Greco-Roman 87 kg	August 7
Bronze	Kristine Jiménez	Judo	Women's 52 kg	August 8
Bronze	Héctor Cención	Karate	Men's individual kata	August 9
Bronze	Miryam Roper	Judo	Women's 57 kg	August 9

**Medals by sport**
**Sport**	1st place, gold medalist(s)	2nd place, silver medalist(s)	3rd place, bronze medalist(s)	**Total**
Judo	0	0	2	2
Karate	0	0	1	1
Wrestling	0	0	1	1
**Total**	**0**	**0**	**4**	**4**

== Athletics (track and field) ==
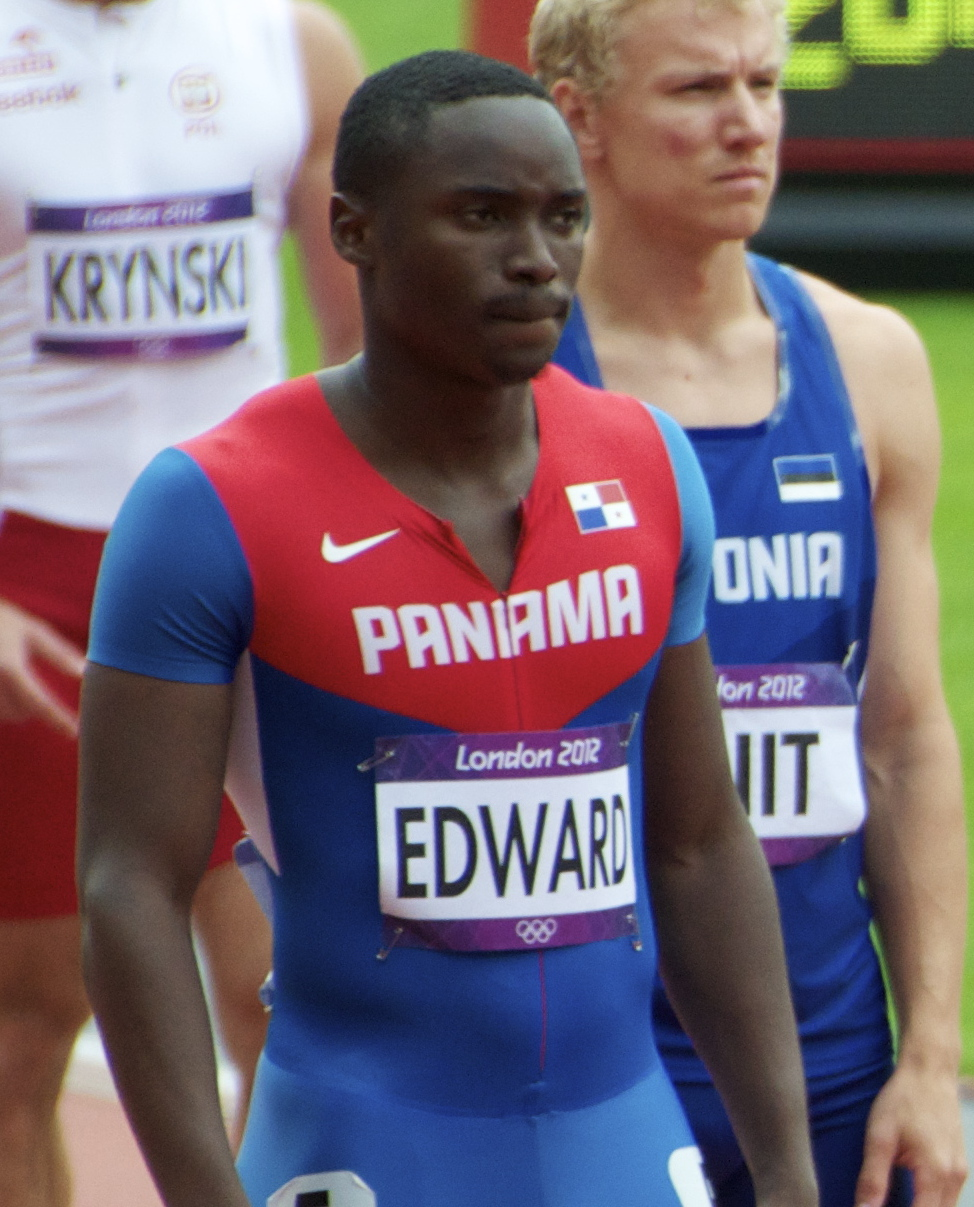
Alonso Edward pictured at the 2012 Summer Olympics, finished fourth in the 200 m event at Lima 2019

Panama qualified eight track and field athletes (three men and five women).

Key

- Note–Ranks given for track events are for the entire round
- **Q** = Qualified for the next round
- **q** = Qualified for the next round as a fastest loser
- **SB** = Seasonal best
- DNF = Did not finish

Track and road events

Athlete	Event	Semifinals		Final	
Athlete	Event	Result	Rank	Result	Rank
Alonso Edward	Men's 200 m	20.65	6 **Q**	20.55	4
Virjilio Griggs	Men's 200 m	DNF			
Yassir Cabrera	Men's 20 km walk	—N/a		1:25:39	9
Gianna Woodruff	Women's 400 m hurdles	56.70	8 **q**	57.20	7
Rolanda Bell	Women's 3000 m steeplechase	—N/a		10:34.76	10
Andrea Ferris	Women's 3000 m steeplechase	—N/a		10:17.21	9

Field events
Women

Athlete	Event	Final	
Athlete	Event	Distance	Position
Aixa Middleton	Discus throw	53.80 **SB**	8
Nathalee Aranda	Long jump	6.55 **SB**	4

== Badminton ==
Panama qualified a team of two badminton athletes (one per gender).

Athlete	Event	Round of 64	Round of 32	Round of 16	Quarterfinals	Semifinals	Final	Rank
Athlete	Event	Opposition Result	Opposition Result	Opposition Result	Opposition Result	Opposition Result	Opposition Result	Rank
Kyle Seixas	Men's singles	Howell (BAR); **W** 2–0 (21–17, 21–17)	Araya (CHI); **L** 0–2 (11–21, 12–21)	did not advance				
Kelly Yau	Women's singles	Wynter (JAM); **L** 0–2 (4–21, 3–21)	did not advance					
Kyle Seixas; Kelly Yau	Mixed doubles	—N/a	Baque / Zambrano (ECU); **L** 0–2 (11–21, 7–21)	did not advance				

== Bowling ==
Athlete	Event	Qualification / Final														Round robin											Semifinal	Final	
Athlete	Event	Block 1						Block 2						Total	Rank	Round robin											Semifinal	Final	
Athlete	Event	1	2	3	4	5	6	7	8	9	10	11	12	Total	Rank	1	2	3	4	5	6	7	8	Total	Grand total	Rank	Opposition Result	Opposition Result	Rank
Donald Lee	Men's singles	195	258	216	217	188	201	226	161	142	227	179	211	2421	26	did not advance													
Santiago Escobar	Men's singles	164	178	202	167	168	183	196	130	214	179	173	229	2183	31	did not advance													
Donald Lee; Santiago Escobar	Men's doubles	388	471	393	376	378	319	400	388	344	400	435	358	4650	14	—N/a													

== Boxing ==
Panama qualified two boxers (one man and one woman).

Athlete	Event	Quarterfinals	Semifinals	Final	Rank
Athlete	Event	Opposition Result	Opposition Result	Opposition Result	Rank
Orlando Martínez	Men's 60 kg	Pezo (PER); **L** 1–4	did not advance		
Atheyna Bylon	Women's 69 kg	Jones (USA); **L** 2–3	did not advance		

== Cycling ==
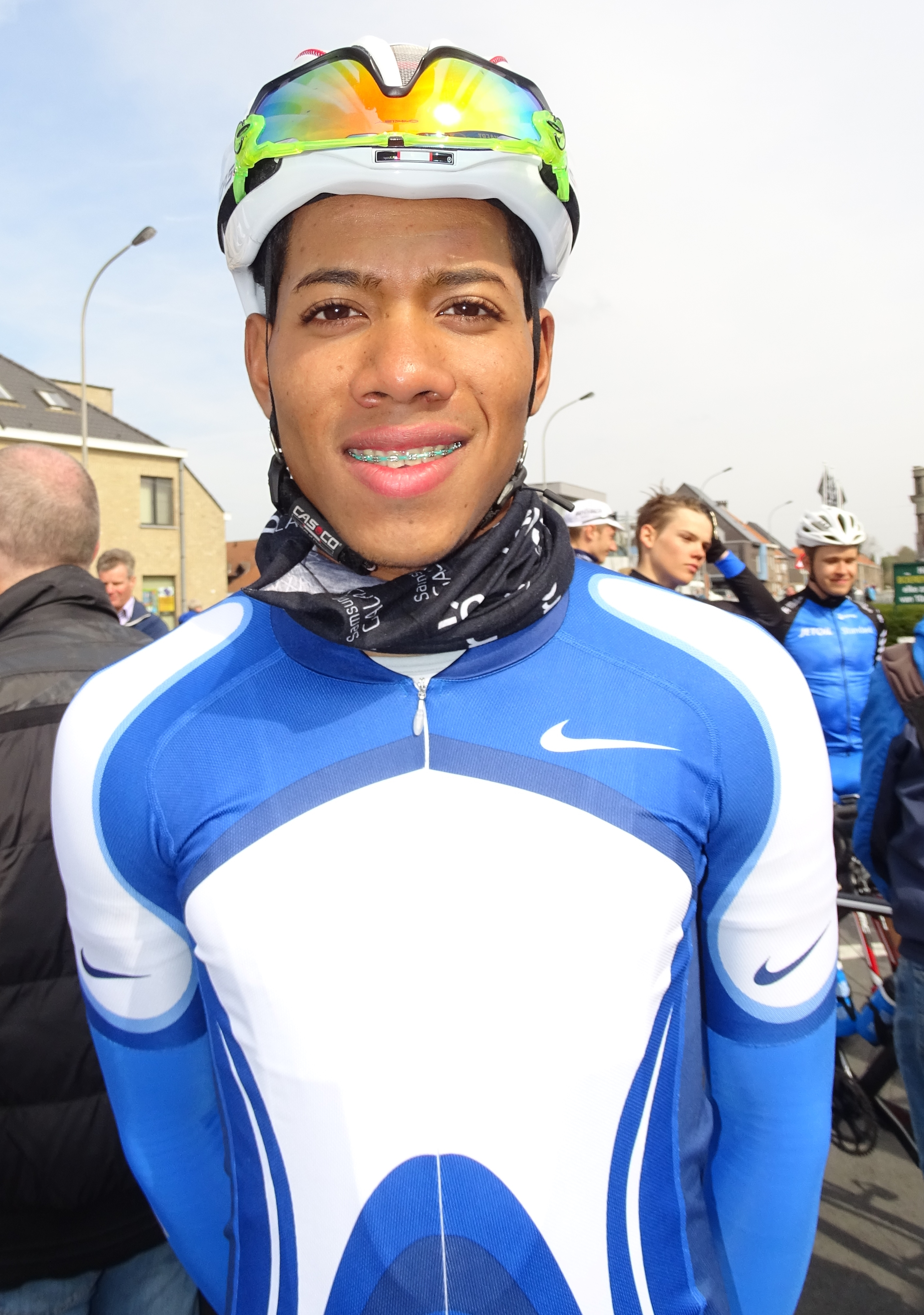
Christofer Jurado competed in two road cycling events

Panama received a reallocated quota for a male road cyclist.

=== Road ===
Men

Athlete	Event	Final	
Athlete	Event	Time	Rank
Christofer Jurado	Road race	4:06:28	4
Christofer Jurado	Time trial	47:01.6	5

== Fencing ==
Panama qualified one female fencer in the sabre discipline.

Women

Athlete	Event	Pool Round		Round of 16	Quarterfinals	Semifinals	Final	
Athlete	Event	Victories	Seed	Opposition Score	Opposition Score	Opposition Score	Opposition Score	Rank
Eileen Grench	Sabre	3	6 **Q**	Infante (MEX); **W** 15–8	Page (CAN); **L** 13–15	did not advance		5

== Football ==
Panama qualified a men's and women's team, and each will consist of 18 athletes, for a total of 36.

=== Men's tournament ===
Panama's men's team qualified by being the top ranked team from the Central American region at the 2018 CONCACAF U-20 Championship.

Roster

Head coach: Julio Dely Valdés

Three overage players were named on 11 July 2019. The 18-man squad was announced on 13 July 2019. Midfielder Justin Simons was replaced by Maikell Díaz.

No.	Pos.	Player	Date of birth (age)	Caps	Goals	Club
1	GK	Samuel Baptista	8 March 1998 (aged 21)	0	0	(Panamanian Football Federation) Costa del Este
2	DF	Iván Anderson	24 November 1997 (aged 21)	0	0	(Panamanian Football Federation) Tauro
3	DF	José Garibaldi	28 May 1997 (aged 22)	0	0	(Panamanian Football Federation) Arabe Unido
4	DF	Emmanuel Chanis	21 December 1998 (aged 20)	0	0	(Panamanian Football Federation) Plaza Amador
5	DF	Manuel Torres	21 November 1978 (aged 40)	35	1	(Panamanian Football Federation) Independiente La Chorrera
6	DF	Samir Ramírez	27 April 1997 (aged 22)	0	0	(Panamanian Football Federation) Universitario
7	FW	Luis Zúñiga	27 January 1997 (aged 22)	0	0	(Peruvian Football Federation) Pirata
8	MF	Adalberto Carrasquilla	28 November 1998 (aged 20)	1	0	(Panamanian Football Federation) Tauro
9	FW	Jorman Aguilar	11 September 1994 (aged 24)	2	0	(Panamanian Football Federation) Independiente La Chorrera
10	MF	Rafael Águila	29 January 1997 (aged 22)	0	0	(Panamanian Football Federation) Veraguas
11	MF	Maikell Díaz	16 February 2000 (aged 19)	0	0	(Panamanian Football Federation) Alianza
12	GK	Aldo Ciel	3 December 1997 (aged 21)	0	0	(Panamanian Football Federation) Arabe Unido
13	DF	Jorge Gutiérrez	1 September 1998 (aged 20)	0	0	(Panamanian Football Federation) Tauro
14	MF	Abdiel Ayarza	12 September 1992 (aged 26)	0	0	(Panamanian Football Federation) Independiente La Chorrera
15	MF	Alejandro Ferrara	20 September 1998 (aged 20)	0	0	(Panamanian Football Federation) Arabe Unido
16	MF	Andrés Peñalba	8 July 1997 (aged 22)	0	0	(Panamanian Football Federation) Universitario
17	DF	Gilberto Hernández	26 June 1997 (aged 22)	0	0	(Panamanian Football Federation) Arabe Unido
18	FW	Tomás Rodríguez	9 March 1999 (aged 20)	0	0	(Panamanian Football Federation) Alianza

Group A

Pos	Team	Pld	W	D	L	GF	GA	GD	Pts	Qualification
1	Mexico	3	2	1	0	4	1	+3	**7**	Knockout stage
2	Argentina	3	2	0	1	7	5	+2	**6**	Knockout stage
3	Panama	3	0	2	1	2	4	−2	**2**	Fifth place match
4	Ecuador	3	0	1	2	3	6	−3	**1**	Seventh place match

Source: Lima 2019
Rules for classification: Tie-breakers
29 July 2019
10:00

Panama	0–0	Mexico
	Report

Estadio Universidad San Marcos
Referee: José Argote (Venezuela)

1 August 2019
10:00

Panama	1–1	Ecuador
Zúñiga 27'	Report	Campana 53'

Estadio Universidad San Marcos
Referee: Miguel Santibañez (Peru)

4 August 2019
10:00

Panama	1–3	Argentina
Aguilar 45'	Report	Gaich 4'; Lomonaco 14'; Valenzuela 80'

Estadio Universidad San Marcos
Referee: Ulises Mereles (Paraguay)

=== Women's tournament ===
Panama's women's team qualified by being the top ranked team from the Central American region at the 2018 CONCACAF Women's Championship.

Roster

Head coach: Victor Daniel Suarez

The following players were called-up.

No.	Pos.	Player	Date of birth (age)	Caps	Goals	Club
1	GK	Yenith Bailey	29 March 2001 (aged 18)			(Panamanian Football Federation) Tauro
12	GK	Sasha Fábrega	23 October 1990 (aged 28)			(Panamanian Football Federation) Aliadas FC
4	DF	Katherine Castillo	23 March 1996 (aged 23)			(Panamanian Football Federation) Universitario
13	DF	Rebeca Espinosa	5 July 1992 (aged 27)			(Panamanian Football Federation) Universitario
2	DF	Hilary Jaén	29 August 2002 (aged 16)			(Panamanian Football Federation) Tauro
3	DF	María Murillo	15 December 1996 (aged 22)			(Panamanian Football Federation) Atlético Nacional
5	DF	Yomira Pinzón	23 August 1996 (aged 22)			(Royal Spanish Football Federation) Pozoalbense
8	MF	Laurie Batista	29 May 1996 (aged 23)			(Panamanian Football Federation) Universitario
10	MF	Marta Cox	20 July 1997 (aged 22)			(Colombian Football Federation) Cortuluá
15	MF	María Guevara	4 October 2000 (aged 18)			(Panamanian Football Federation) Universitario
11	MF	Natalia Mills	22 March 1993 (aged 26)			(Royal Spanish Football Federation) Fundación Albacete
6	MF	Aldrith Quintero	1 January 2002 (aged 17)			(Panamanian Football Federation) Tauro
7	MF	Gloria Sáenz	2 July 2002 (aged 17)			(Panamanian Football Federation) Atlético Nacional
14	MF	Deysire Salazar	4 May 2004 (aged 15)			(Panamanian Football Federation) Tauro
16	FW	Lineth Cedeño	5 December 2000 (aged 18)			(Royal Spanish Football Federation) Joventut Almassora
18	FW	Ángela Evans	21 July 1993 (aged 26)			(Football Association of Ireland) Kilkenny United
17	FW	Erika Hernández	17 March 1999 (aged 20)			(Panamanian Football Federation) Universitario
9	FW	Karla Riley	18 September 1997 (aged 21)			(Royal Spanish Football Federation) Pozoalbense

Group B

Pos	Team	Pld	W	D	L	GF	GA	GD	Pts	Qualification
1	Costa Rica	3	2	1	0	6	2	+4	**7**	Knockout stage
2	Argentina	3	2	1	0	4	0	+4	**7**	Knockout stage
3	Panama	3	0	1	2	2	5	−3	**1**	Fifth place match
4	Peru (H)	3	0	1	2	2	7	−5	**1**	Seventh place match

Source: Lima 2019
Rules for classification: Tie-breakers
(H) Hosts
28 July 2019
17:30

Panama	1–3	Costa Rica
Mills 14'	Report	Chinchilla 73', 85'; Blanco 79'

Estadio Universidad San Marcos
Referee: Susana Corella (Ecuador)

31 July 2019
17:30

Panama	0–1	Argentina
	Report	Larroquette 66'

Estadio Universidad San Marcos
Referee: Yercinia Correa (Venezuela)

3 August 2019
20:30

Panama	1–1	Peru
Cox 39' (pen.)	Report	Otiniano 41'

Estadio Universidad San Marcos
Referee: Yercinia Correa (Venezuela)

== Golf ==
Panama qualified a full team of four golfers (two men and two women). However, only three golfers were entered.

Athlete(s)	Event	Final						
Athlete(s)	Event	Round 1	Round 2	Round 3	Round 4	Total	To par	Rank
Jean Louis Ducruet	Men's individual	71	76	74	76	297	+13	=30
Michael Mendez	Men's individual	73	76	72	81	302	+18	32
Laura Restrepo	Women's individual	78	72	76	74	300	+16	=21
Jean Louis Ducruet; Michael Mendez; Laura Restrepo	Mixed team	149	148	148	150	595	+27	15

== Judo ==
Panama qualified four judoka (two men and two women).

Athlete	Event	Preliminaries	Quarterfinals	Semifinals	Repechage	Final / BM	
Athlete	Event	Opposition Result	Opposition Result	Opposition Result	Opposition Result	Opposition Result	Rank
Bernabé Vergara	Men's 60 kg	Molina (GUA); **W** 01S2–00	Almenares (CUB); **L** 00S2–01S2	Did not advance	Diaz (USA); **L** 00S1–01S1	Did not advance	=7
José Luis Ortega	Men's 90 kg	Peña (VEN); **L** 00S1–10	did not advance				
**Kristine Jiménez**	Women's 52 kg	Bye	Acosta (CUB); **L** 00S3–10	Did not advance	Elizeche (ARG); **W** 10S2–00	Gamarra (PER); **W** 01S2–00S1	3rd place, bronze medalist(s)
**Miryam Roper**	Women's 57 kg	Bye	Amaris (COL); **W** 10S1–01S2	Rosa (DOM); **L** 00S1–10S2	Bye	García (MEX); **W** 10S1–00S1	3rd place, bronze medalist(s)

== Karate ==
Panama qualified two karatekas (one per gender).

Kata
Men

Athlete	Event	Round Robin		Final / BM	
Athlete	Event	Points	Rank	Opposition Result	Rank
**Hector Cencion**	Individual kata	22.52	3 **QB**	Tejada (ECU); **W** 23.98–23.32	3rd place, bronze medalist(s)

Kumite
Women

Athlete	Event	Round Robin				Semifinals	Final	
Athlete	Event	Opposition Result	Opposition Result	Opposition Result	Rank	Opposition Result	Opposition Result	Rank
Raquel Bozelli	–55 kg	Kumizaki (BRA); **L** 0–1	Aros (CHI); **W** 8–1	Flores (MEX); **L** 0–1	3	did not advance		

== Modern Pentathlon ==
Panama qualified one male modern pentathlete.

Men

Athlete	Event	Fencing (Épée One Touch + Bonus round)			Swimming (200m Freestyle)			Riding (Show Jumping)			Shooting/Running (10 m Air Pistol/3000m)			Total Points	Final Rank
Athlete	Event	Wins	Rank	MP Points	Time	Rank	MP Points	Penalties	Rank	MP Points	Time	Rank	MP Points	Total Points	Final Rank
Samuel Smith	Individual	8	29	152	2:25.29	27	260	43	18	257	13:48.00	30	472	1141	21

== Shooting ==
Panama qualified five male sport shooters.

Men

Athlete	Event	Qualification		Final	
Athlete	Event	Points	Rank	Points	Rank
Juan Campos	10 m air pistol	560	21	did not advance	
David Muñoz	10 m air pistol	556	26	did not advance	
Marco Chu	Skeet	101	26	did not advance	
Manuel García	Trap	111	=17	did not advance	
Eduardo Taylor	Trap	116	=7	did not advance	

== Surfing ==
Panama received a reallocated spot for one female surfer in the sport's debut at the Pan American Games.

Women

Athlete	Event	Main round 1	Main round 2	Repechage 1	Repechage 2	Main round 3	Repechage 3	Repechage 4	Repechage 5	Main round 4	Final / BM	Rank
Athlete	Event	Opposition Result	Opposition Result	Opposition Result	Opposition Result	Opposition Result	Opposition Result	Opposition Result	Opposition Result	Opposition Result	Opposition Result	Rank
Enilda Alonso	Open surf	Ribeiro (BRA); **L** 8.77–8.90	Did not advance	Anderson (CHI); **L** 7.33–10.10	did not advance							=13

== Swimming ==
Panama qualified nine swimmers (four men and five women).

Key

- Note – Ranks given are for the entire round
- **NR** – National record
- **QA** – Qualified for Final A
- **QB** – Qualified for Final B

Men

Athlete	Event	Heat		Final	
Athlete	Event	Time	Rank	Time	Rank
Isaac Beitía	50 m freestyle	23.48	19	did not advance	
Isaac Beitía	100 m freestyle	51.18	16 **QB**	52.03	16
Hernán González	100 m backstroke	59.65	21	did not advance	
Hernán González	200 m backstroke	2:11.84	22	did not advance	
Édgar Crespo	100 m breaststroke	1:02.95	16 **QB**	1:02.31	11
Édgar Crespo	200 m breaststroke	2:24.12	16 **QB**	2:21.60	13
Bernhard Christianson	200 m individual medley	2:04.00	8 **QA**	2:03.28	6
Bernhard Christianson	400 m individual medley	4:28.34	10 **QB**	4:25.93	10
Isaac Beitía; Hernán Gonzalez; Bernhard Christianson; Édgar Crespo	4 × 100 m freestyle relay	—N/a		3:31.26	7
Hernán Gonzalez; Édgar Crespo; Bernhard Christianson; Isaac Beitía	4 × 100 m medley relay	3:51.41	8 **QA**	3:50.52	8

Women

Athlete	Event	Heat		Final	
Athlete	Event	Time	Rank	Time	Rank
Catharine Cooper	50 m freestyle	26.81	16 **QB**	27.01	16
Catharine Cooper	100 m freestyle	59.66	23	did not advance	
Ireyra Tamayo	200 m freestyle	2:12.46	20	did not advance	
Nimia Murua	100 m backstroke	1:05.63	19	did not advance	
Carolina Cermelli	200 m backstroke	2:22.14	17	did not advance	
Emily Santos	100 m breaststroke	1:12.39	13 **QB**	1:14.45	14
Emily Santos	200 m breaststroke	2:45.21	17	did not advance	
Ireyra Tamayo; Emily Santos; Nimia Murua; Catharine Cooper	4 × 100 m freestyle relay	—N/a		4:05.16	7
Carolina Cermelli; Emily Santos; Ireyra Tamayo; Catherine Cooper	4 × 100 m medley relay	4:27.87	9	did not advance	

Mixed

Athlete	Event	Heat		Final	
Athlete	Event	Time	Rank	Time	Rank
Isaac Beitia; Catherine Cooper; Ireyra Tamayo; Hernán Gonzalez	4 × 100 m freestyle relay	3:55.11	9	did not advance	
Carolina Cermelli; Édgar Crespo; Bernhard Christianson; Ireyra Tamayo	4 × 100 m medley relay	4:06.11	9	did not advance	

== Taekwondo ==
Panama received one wildcard in the women's 57 kg event.

Kyorugi
Women

Athlete	Event	Round of 16	Quarterfinals	Semifinals	Repechage	Final / BM	Rank
Athlete	Event	Opposition Result	Opposition Result	Opposition Result	Opposition Result	Opposition Result	Rank
Carolena Carstens	-57 kg	Núñez (CUB); **W** 20–0	Villegas (MEX); **W** 35–15	Zolotic (USA); **L** 10–24	—N/a	Aguirre (CHI); **L** 7–12	=5

== Triathlon ==
Panama qualified two male triathletes.

Men

Athlete	Event	Swim (1.5 km)	Trans 1	Bike (40 km)	Trans 2	Run (8.88 km)	Total	Rank
Billy Gordon	Individual	19:32	0:57	1:26:4	0:34	36:38	2:04:00	26
Petter Vega	Individual	19:50	0:53	1:25:3	0:25	36:27	2:02:24	25

== Weightlifting ==
Panama qualified two male weightlifters and received a reallocated spot for a female lifter.

Athlete	Event	Snatch		Clean & Jerk		Total	Rank
Athlete	Event	Result	Rank	Result	Rank	Total	Rank
Ariel Batista	Men's 73 kg	110	11	No mark		did not finish	
Eustaciano Arías	Men's 81 kg	130	5	155	5	285	5
Erika Ortega	Women's 49 kg	70	10	83	8	153	8

== Wrestling ==
Panama received one wild card in the Greco-Roman discipline.

Men

Athlete	Event	Qualification	Quarterfinals	Semifinals	Repechage	Final / BM	Rank
Athlete	Event	Opposition Result	Opposition Result	Opposition Result	Opposition Result	Opposition Result	Rank
**Alvis Almendra**	Greco-Roman 87 kg	Bye	Leyva (MEX); **L** 0–8	Did not advance	—N/a	Muñoz (COL); **W** 2–1	3rd place, bronze medalist(s)

== Non-competing sports ==
=== Equestrian ===
Panama qualified one athlete in equestrian jumping. However, no athlete from Panama competed.

=== Gymnastics ===
Panama qualified one female artistic gymnast. However, no gymnast from the country competed.

== See also ==
- Panama at the 2020 Summer Olympics
