= Shooting at the 2015 Pan American Games – Men's 25 metre rapid fire pistol =

Shooting – Men's 25 metre rapid fire pistol at the 2015 Pan American Games
- Venue: Pan Am Shooting Centre
- Dates: July 14–15
- Competitors: 20 from 13 nations
- Winning score: 32

Medalists
Gold medal	Brad Balsley	United States
Silver medal	Emerson Duarte	Brazil
Bronze medal	Douglas Gomez	Venezuela

The men's 25 metre rapid fire pistol shooting event at the 2015 Pan American Games will be held between the 14 and 15 of July at the Pan Am Shooting Centre in Innisfil.

The event consisted of two rounds: a qualifier and a final. In the qualifier, each shooter fired 60 shots with a pistol at 25 metres distance. Scores for each shot were in increments of 1, with a maximum score of 10. Targets were presented in series of 5. Each shooter was presented with 12 series, and had a sharply limited time to complete each. Four of the series had to be completed in 8 seconds apiece, four more within 6 seconds, and four within 4 seconds.

The top 6 shooters in the qualifying round moved on to the final round. There, they fired an additional 20 shots. These shots scored in increments of .1, with a maximum score of 10.9. They were presented in four series of 5 shots each, with each series being limited to 4 seconds to make all five shots. The total score from all 80 shots was used to determine final ranking.

The winners of all fifteen events, along with the runner up in the men's air rifle, skeet, trap and both women's rifle events will qualify for the 2016 Summer Olympics in Rio de Janeiro, Brazil (granted the athlete has not yet earned a quota for their country).

== Schedule ==
All times are Central Standard Time (UTC-6).

Date	Time	Round
July 14, 2015	9:00	Qualification Stage 1
July 14, 2015	9:00	Qualification Stage 2
July 15, 2015	14:30	Final

== Results ==
=== Qualification round ===
Rank	Athlete	Country	8 s	6 s	4 s	8 s	6 s	4 s	Total	Notes
1	Emil Milev	United States	99	99	95	96	99	94	582-16x	Q, EPR
2	Jorge Alvarez	Cuba	99	98	93	99	98	94	581-21x	Q
3	Leuris Pupo	Cuba	95	97	94	100	98	96	580-17x	Q
4	Emerson Duarte	Brazil	99	97	92	99	99	94	579-17x	Q
5	Douglas Gomez	Venezuela	96	97	92	99	96	96	576-21x	Q
6	Brad Balsley	United States	96	95	95	95	98	86	565-14x	Q
7	Adan Rodriguez	Mexico	94	96	90	97	95	91	563-12x	
8	Marko Carrillo	Peru	95	96	90	95	93	89	558-14x	
9	Metodi Igorov	Canada	97	93	89	91	92	95	557-10x	
10	Diego Cossio Quiroga	Bolivia	95	92	93	97	85	90	552-12x	
11	Daniel César Felizia	Argentina	85	93	90	95	95	93	551-10x	
12	Iosef Forma	Brazil	95	94	88	97	87	85	546-15x	
13	Sergio Sánchez	Guatemala	92	94	84	92	88	89	539-09x	
14	Hermes Barahona	El Salvador	94	92	93	97	86	74	536-11x	
15	Marvin Herrera	Guatemala	86	92	72	94	94	89	527-07x	
16	Ivan Galvez	Peru	87	76	73	0	0	0	236-01x	DNF
	Josue Hernandez Caba	Dominican Republic								DNS
	David Muñoz	Panama								DNS
	Juan Savarino	Argentina								DNS
	Francisco Yanisselly	Panama								DNS

=== Final ===
Rank	Athlete	Country	1	2	3	4	5	6	7	8	Total	Note
1st place, gold medalist(s)	Brad Balsley	United States	4	4	4	4	5	3	5	3	32	
2nd place, silver medalist(s)	Emerson Duarte	Brazil	3	4	4	4	5	4	3	4	31	S-Off 5
3rd place, bronze medalist(s)	Douglas Gomez	Venezuela	4	5	2	5	4	4	3		27	S-Off 4
4	Leuris Pupo	Cuba	4	3	4	2	5	5			23	S-Off 4-4
5	Emil Milev	United States	5	3	5	2	2				17	
6	Jorge Alvarez	Cuba	3	3	4	3					13	S-Off 4-3
