= Panama at the 2015 Pan American Games =

- IOC code: PAN
- NOC: Comité Olímpico de Panamá
- Website: www.conpanama.org

in Toronto, Canada 10–26 July 2015
- Competitors: 44 in 12 sports
- Flag bearer (opening): Édgar Crespo
- Flag bearer (closing): Eileen Grench
- Medals Ranked 24th: Gold 0 Silver 1 Bronze 1 Total 2

Pan American Games appearances (overview)
- 1951; 1955; 1959; 1963; 1967; 1971; 1975; 1979; 1983; 1987; 1991; 1995; 1999; 2003; 2007; 2011; 2015; 2019; 2023

Panama competed in the 2015 Pan American Games in Toronto, Canada from July 10 to 26, 2015.

Swimmer Édgar Crespo was the flagbearer of the country at the opening ceremony.

Panama finished the competition with two medals, one silver and one bronze, and was ranked 24th overall.

== Competitors ==
The following table lists Panama's delegation per sport and gender.

Sport	Men	Women	Total
Athletics	1	5	6
Bowling	2	0	2
Fencing	0	1	1
Football (soccer)	18	0	18
Gymnastics	1	1	2
Modern pentathlon	2	0	2
Shooting	4	0	4
Swimming	1	1	2
Taekwondo	1	1	2
Triathlon	1	0	1
Weightlifting	1	1	2
Wrestling	2	0	2
Total	34	10	44

== Medalists ==
The following competitors from Panama won medals at the games. In the by discipline sections below, medalists' names are bolded.

Medal	Name	Sport	Event	Date
Silver	Alvis Almendra	Wrestling	Men's Greco-Roman 75 kg	July 15
Bronze	Alonso Edward	Athletics	Men's 200m	July 24

**Medals by sport**
**Sport**	1st place, gold medalist(s)	2nd place, silver medalist(s)	3rd place, bronze medalist(s)	**Total**
Wrestling	0	0	1	0
Athletics	0	0	0	1
**Total**	**0**	**1**	**1**	**2**

**Medals by day**
**Day**	1st place, gold medalist(s)	2nd place, silver medalist(s)	3rd place, bronze medalist(s)	**Total**
July 15	0	1	0	0
July 24	0	0	1	1
**Total**	**0**	**1**	**1**	**2**

== Athletics ==
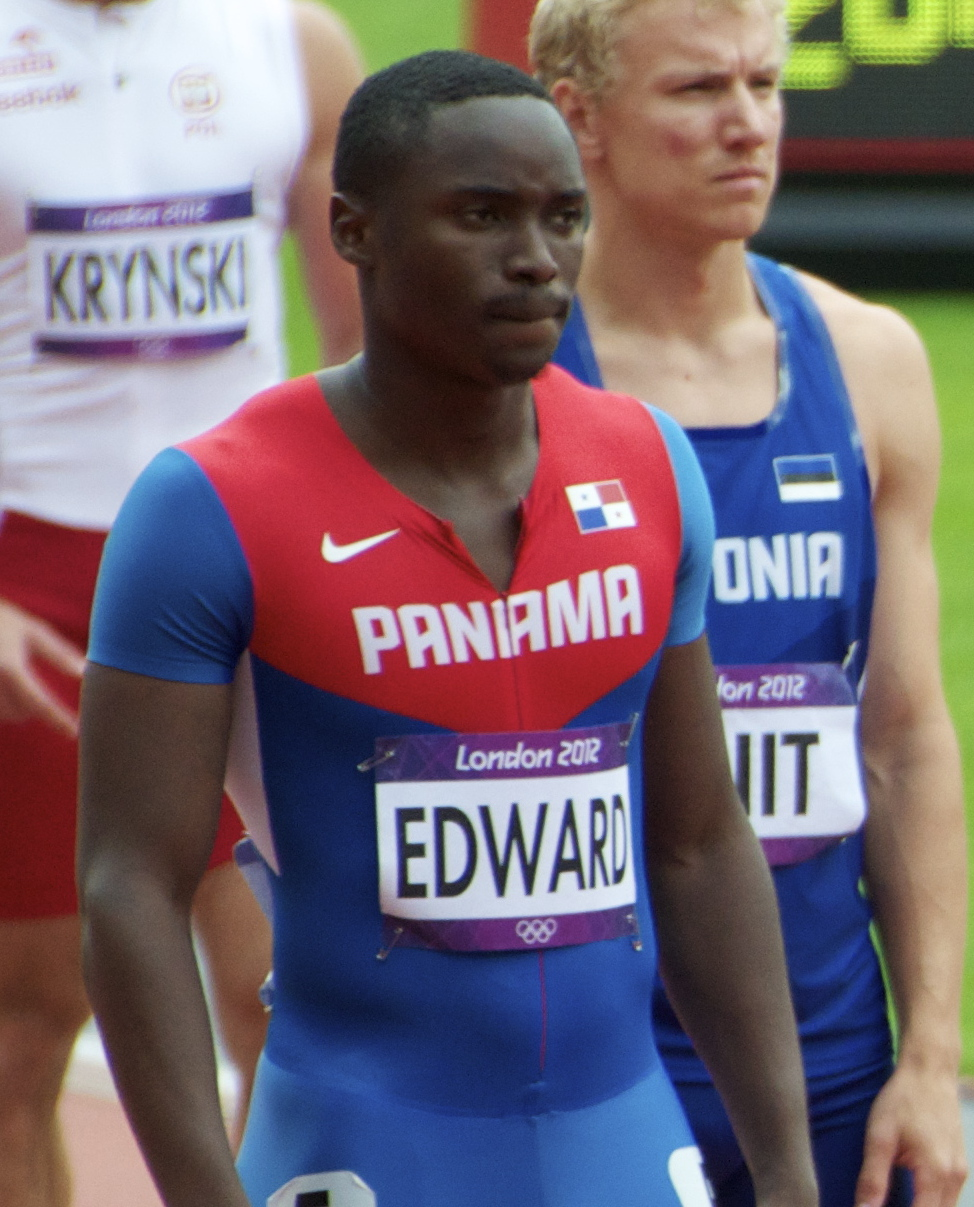
Alonso Edward, pictured here at the 2012 Summer Olympics won a bronze medal in the 200 m event.

Key

- Note–Ranks given for track events are for the entire round
- **Q** = Qualified for the next round
- **SB** = Seasonal best

Men
Track

Athlete	Event	Round 1		Semifinal		Final	
Athlete	Event	Result	Rank	Result	Rank	Result	Rank
**Alonso Edward**	200 m	20.39 **Q**	7	20.09 **Q**	=4	19.90 **SB**	3rd place, bronze medalist(s)

Women
Track

Athlete	Event	Semifinal		Final	
Athlete	Event	Result	Rank	Result	Rank
Andrea Ferris	1500 m	—N/a		4:23.96 **SB**	8
Andrea Ferris	3000 m steeplechase	—N/a		10:40.10	9
Yvette Lewis	100 m hurdles	12.92 **Q**	4	13.29	8

Field events

Athlete	Event	Final	
Athlete	Event	Distance	Position
Kashany Rios	High jump	1.70	16
Aixa Middleton	Discus throw	50.62	9

== Bowling ==
Panama qualified two male bowlers.

Singles

Athlete	Event	Qualification															Round robin				Semifinals		Finals
Athlete	Event	Block 1 (Games 1–6)						Block 2 (Games 7–12)						Total	Average	Rank	Total	Average	Grand Total	Rank	Semifinals		Finals
Athlete	Event	1	2	3	4	5	6	7	8	9	10	11	12	Total	Average	Rank	Total	Average	Grand Total	Rank	Opposition Result	Opposition Result	Rank
Juan Narvaez	Men's	214	176	225	155	199	191	164	220	250	158	212	234	2398	199.8	15	did not advance						15
Carlos Olmos	Men's	212	209	200	186	184	199	170	155	190	181	185	234	2305	192.1	20	did not advance						20

Doubles

Athlete	Event	Block 1 (Games 1–6)								Block 2 (Games 7–12)								Grand Total	Final Rank
Athlete	Event	1	2	3	4	5	6	Total	Average	7	8	9	10	11	12	Total	Average	Grand Total	Final Rank
Juan Narvaez; Carlos Olmos	Men's	227	201	172	155	169	171	1095	182.5	198	236	195	206	177	179	2286	190.5	4709	11
Juan Narvaez; Carlos Olmos	Men's	172	205	243	207	158	199	1184	197.3	188	199	256	181	234	181	2423	201.9	4709	11

== Fencing ==
Panama qualified 1 fencer (1 woman).

Athlete	Event	Pool Round		Round of 16	Quarterfinals	Semifinals	Final	
Athlete	Event	Victories	Seed	Opposition Score	Opposition Score	Opposition Score	Opposition Score	Rank
Eileen Grench	Women's Sabre	4	2	Giulia Gasparin (BRA); **W** 15–4	Alejandra Benítez (VEN); **L** 8–15	did not advance		6

== Football ==
=== Men's tournament ===
Panama's men's U-22 football team qualified to compete at the games after winning the Central American qualifying tournament. The roster for Panama was as follows.

Head coach: (Argentina) Leonardo Pipino

No.	Pos.	Player	Date of birth (age)	Club
1	GK	Jaime de Gracia	May 11, 1996 (aged 19)	(Panamanian Football Federation) Tauro
2	DF	Richard Dixon	March 28, 1992 (aged 23)	(Panamanian Football Federation) Chorrillo
3	DF	Josué Flores	March 31, 1993 (aged 22)	(Panamanian Football Federation) Chorrillo
4	DF	Carlos Rodríguez	April 12, 1990 (aged 25)	(Panamanian Football Federation) Chepo
5	MF	Francisco Narbón	February 11, 1995 (aged 20)	(United States Soccer Federation) James Madison University
6	DF	Fidel Escobar	January 9, 1995 (aged 20)	(Panamanian Football Federation) Sporting San Miguelito
7	MF	Jairo Jiménez	January 7, 1993 (aged 22)	(Royal Spanish Football Federation) Elche B
8	MF	Pedro Jeanine	September 4, 1993 (aged 21)	(Panamanian Football Federation) San Francisco
9	FW	Cecilio Waterman	April 13, 1991 (aged 24)	(Uruguayan Football Association) Fenix
10	MF	Jhamal Rodríguez	January 28, 1995 (aged 20)	(Panamanian Football Federation) Chorrillo
11	FW	Jorman Aguilar	September 11, 1994 (aged 20)	(Panamanian Football Federation) Independiente
12	GK	Elieser Powell	April 21, 1994 (aged 21)	(Panamanian Football Federation) Chorrillo
13	DF	Jan Vargas	September 27, 1994 (aged 20)	(Panamanian Football Federation) Tauro
14	DF	Michael Amir Murillo	February 11, 1996 (aged 19)	(Panamanian Football Federation) San Francisco
15	DF	Richard Peralta	September 20, 1993 (aged 21)	(Panamanian Football Federation) Alianza
16	MF	José Muñoz	January 15, 1993 (aged 22)	(Panamanian Football Federation) Alianza
17	MF	Josiel Núñez	January 29, 1993 (aged 22)	(Panamanian Football Federation) Plaza Amador
18	FW	Yoel Bárcenas	October 23, 1993 (aged 21)	(Panamanian Football Federation) Arabe Unido

Group A

Pos	Team	Pld	W	D	L	GF	GA	GD	Pts	Qualification
1	Brazil	3	2	1	0	11	4	+7	**7**	Medal round
2	Panama	3	1	2	0	5	4	+1	**5**	Medal round
3	Peru	3	1	0	2	3	6	−3	**3**	
4	Canada (H)	3	0	1	2	1	6	−5	**1**	

Source: Toronto 2015
(H) Hosts
July 12, 2015
17:35

Panama	2–1	Peru
Aguilar 47'; Escobar 90' (pen.)	Report	Maldonado 54'

Hamilton Pan Am Soccer Stadium, Hamilton
Referee: Jeffrey Solís (Costa Rica)

July 16, 2015
20:35

Panama	0–0	Canada
	Report

Hamilton Pan Am Soccer Stadium, Hamilton
Referee: Valdin Legister (Jamaica)

July 20, 2015
17:35

Brazil	3–3	Panama
Luciano 24', 25'; Clayton 37'	Report	Aguilar 40', 51'; Escobar 56' (pen.)

Hamilton Pan Am Soccer Stadium, Hamilton
Referee: José Peñaloza (Mexico)

Semifinals

July 23, 2015
20:35

Mexico	2–1	Panama
Zaldívar 2'; Cisneros 61'	Report	Núñez 59'

Hamilton Pan Am Soccer Stadium, Hamilton
Referee: Javier Santos (Puerto Rico)

Bronze medal match

July 25, 2015
13:05

Brazil	3–1 (a.e.t.)	Panama
Luciano 76' (pen.), 115' (pen.); Lucas Piazon 99'	Report	Núñez 45+2'

Hamilton Pan Am Soccer Stadium, Hamilton
Referee: Valdin Legister (Jamaica)

== Gymnastics ==
Panama has qualified two gymnasts.

=== Artistic ===
Men

Panama has qualified one male artistic gymnast.

Athlete	Event	Qualification								Final							
Athlete	Event	Apparatus						Total	Rank	Apparatus						Total	Rank
Athlete	Event	F	PH	R	V	PB	HB	Total	Rank	F	PH	R	V	PB	HB	Total	Rank
Kevin Espinosa	All-Around	12.500	11.750	9.300	12.650	11.350	10.550	68.100	33	did not advance							

Women

Panama has qualified one female artistic gymnast.

Athlete	Event	Qualification						Final					
Athlete	Event	Apparatus				Total	Rank	Apparatus				Total	Rank
Athlete	Event	F	V	UB	BB	Total	Rank	F	V	UB	BB	Total	Rank
Isabella Amado Medrano	All-Around	14.050	11.850	12.350	13.200	51.450	14 **Q**	13.650	10.950	11.750	12.150	48.500	18

Qualification Legend: Q = Qualified to apparatus final

== Modern pentathlon ==
Panama has qualified a team of 3 athletes (2 men and 1 woman). However, Panama did not register its female athlete for this event.

Men

Athlete	Event	Fencing (Épée One Touch)			Swimming (200m Freestyle)			Riding (Show Jumping)			Shooting/Running (10 m Air Pistol/3000m)			Total Points	Final Rank
Athlete	Event	Results	Rank	MP Points	Time	Rank	MP Points	Penalties	Rank	MP Points	Time	Rank	MP Points	Total Points	Final Rank
Missael Aguilar	Men's	13	19	194	2:48.77	28	194	DNS	—N/a	0	15:22.09	27	378	766	27
Jose Guitian	Men's	13	18	194	2:28.16	24	256	71.35	11	276	13:57.82	21	463	1189	17

== Shooting ==
Panama qualified four shooters.

Men

Athlete	Event	Qualification		Semifinal		Final / BM	
Athlete	Event	Score	Rank	Score	Rank	Opposition / Score	Rank
David Muñoz	10 m air pistol	577	1 **Q**	—N/a		114.7	6
Francisco Yanisselly	10 m air pistol	547	30	—N/a		did not advance	
David Muñoz	25 m rapid fire pistol	DNS		—N/a		did not advance	
Francisco Yanisselly	25 m rapid fire pistol	DNS		—N/a		did not advance	
David Muñoz	50 m pistol	530	15	—N/a		did not advance	
Francisco Yanisselly	50 m pistol	503	25	—N/a		did not advance	
Manuel Garcia	Trap	84	26	did not advance			
Eduardo Taylor	Trap	94	25	did not advance			
Manuel Garcia	Double trap	83	19	did not advance			
Eduardo Taylor	Double trap	102	16	did not advance			

== Swimming ==
Panama qualified two swimmers (one man and one woman).

Key

- Note – Ranks given are for the entire round
- **FA** = Qualified for the A Final
- **FB** = Qualified for the B Final

Athlete	Event	Heat		Final	
Athlete	Event	Time	Rank	Time	Rank
Édgar Crespo	Men's 100m breaststroke	1:02:01	8 **FA**	1:01:88	8
Maria Fernanda Far	Women's 200m butterfly	2:18.57	12 **FB**	2:18:75	14
Maria Fernanda Far	Women's 400m Individual Medley	5:10.85	13 **FB**	5:06.36	12

== Taekwondo ==
Panama qualified a team of one female athlete, and also received a wildcard to enter a male athlete.

Athlete	Event	Round of 16	Quarterfinals	Semifinals	Repechage	Bronze Medal	Final	
Athlete	Event	Opposition Result	Opposition Result	Opposition Result	Opposition Result	Opposition Result	Opposition Result	Rank
Victor Gonzalez	Men's -58kg	Venilton Torres (BRA); **L** 1–14	did not advance					
Carolena Carstens	Women's -57kg	Celina Proffen (ARG); **L** 2–3	did not advance					

== Triathlon ==
Panama has received a wildcard to enter one male triathlete.

Men

Athlete	Event	Swim (1.5 km)	Trans 1	Bike (40 km)	Trans 2	Run (10 km)	Total	Rank
Billy Gordon	Individual	20:26	0:25	DNF				

== Weightlifting ==
Panama qualified one male and one female weightlifter.

Athlete	Event	Snatch		Clean & jerk		Total	Rank
Athlete	Event	Result	Rank	Result	Rank	Total	Rank
Ariel Batista	Men's 69 kg	120	10	145	11	265	10
Rocio Navarro Castillo	Women's 69 kg	87	8	110	9	197	8

== Wrestling ==
Panama qualified two male wrestlers.

Men

Athlete	Event	Preliminaries	Quarterfinals	Semifinals	Final / BM	Rank
Athlete	Event	Opposition Result	Opposition Result	Opposition Result	Opposition Result	Rank
Yohar Munoz	Freestyle 74 kg	Jevon Balfour (CAN); **L** 0–10	did not advance			7
**Alvis Almendra**	Greco-Roman 75 kg	—N/a	Maximiliano Prudenzano (ARG); **W** 9–0	Carlos Muñoz (COL); **W** 2–2	Andy Bisek (USA); **L** 0–8	2nd place, silver medalist(s)

== See also ==
- Panama at the 2016 Summer Olympics
