= Swimming at the 2019 Pan American Games – Women's 100 metre backstroke =

Women's 100 metre backstroke at the 2019 Pan American Games
- Venue: Villa Deportiva Nacional, VIDENA
- Dates: August 8 (preliminaries and finals)
- Competitors: 24 from 21 nations
- Winning time: 59.47

Medalists
Gold medal	Phoebe Bacon	United States
Silver medal	Danielle Hanus	Canada
Bronze medal	Etiene Medeiros	Brazil

The women's 100 metre backstroke competition of the swimming events at the 2019 Pan American Games are scheduled to be held August 8th, 2019 at the Villa Deportiva Nacional Videna cluster.

== Records ==
Prior to this competition, the existing world and Pan American Games records were as follows:

World record	Regan Smith (USA)	57.57	Gwangju, South Korea	July 28, 2019
Pan American Games record	Natalie Coughlin (USA)	59.05	Toronto, Canada	July 18, 2015

== Results ==
KEY:	q	Fastest non-qualifiers	Q	Qualified	GR	Games record	NR	National record	PB	Personal best	SB	Seasonal best

=== Heats ===
The first round was held on August 8.

Rank	Heat	Lane	Name	Nationality	Time	Notes
1	4	4	Phoebe Bacon	United States	59.66	QA
2	4	5	Danielle Hanus	Canada	1:00.75	QA
3	3	4	Alexandra DeLoof	United States	1:01.12	QA
4	4	6	Fernanda de Goeij	Brazil	1:01.63	QA
5	3	6	Carmen Marquez Orellana	El Salvador	1:01.92	QA, NR
6	3	3	Andrea Berrino	Argentina	1:02.34	WD
7	2	4	Etiene Medeiros	Brazil	1:02.85	QA
8	3	5	Madison Broad	Canada	1:02.99	QA
9	4	3	Krystal Lara Garzon	Dominican Republic	1:03.58	QA
10	2	5	Isabella Arcila	Colombia	1:03.59	QB
11	2	6	Athena Kovacs	Mexico	1:04.74	QB
11	4	1	Gabriela Donahue	Trinidad and Tobago	1:04.74	QB, NR
13	2	3	Celismar Guzman	Puerto Rico	1:04.75	QB
14	3	1	Alexia Sotomayor	Peru	1:04.96	QB
15	2	7	Andrea Becali Martí	Cuba	1:04.98	QB
16	3	7	Danielle Titus	Barbados	1:05.40	QB
17	2	1	Domenica Solano Ocampo	Ecuador	1:05.45	QB
18	4	2	Carla Gonzalez	Venezuela	1:05.62	
19	4	8	Nimia Murua	Panama	1:05.63	
20	2	2	Trinidad Ardiles Quiroz	Chile	1:06.66	
21	1	4	Nicole Frank Rodriguez	Uruguay	1:06.89	
22	4	7	Maria Jose Arrua	Paraguay	1:07.25	
23	1	5	Kimberly Ince	Grenada	1:10.48	
24	1	3	María Hernández	Nicaragua	1:11.75	
	3	2	Andrea Hurtado	Peru	DNS	

=== Final B ===
The B final was also held on August 8.

Rank	Lane	Name	Nationality	Time	Notes
9	4	Isabella Arcila	Colombia	1:03.55	
10	5	Athena Kovacs	Mexico	1:04.20	
11	3	Gabriela Donahue	Trinidad and Tobago	1:04.62	NR
12	8	Domenica Solano Ocampo	Ecuador	1:04.72	NR
13	6	Celismar Guzman	Puerto Rico	1:04.93	
14	1	Danielle Titus	Barbados	1:04.95	
15	2	Alexia Sotomayor	Peru	1:05.21	
16	7	Andrea Becali Martí	Cuba	1:05.23	

=== Final A ===
The A final was also held on August 8.

Rank	Lane	Name	Nationality	Time	Notes
1st place, gold medalist(s)	4	Phoebe Bacon	United States	59.47	
2nd place, silver medalist(s)	5	Danielle Hanus	Canada	1:00.34	
3rd place, bronze medalist(s)	7	Etiene Medeiros	Brazil	1:00.67	
4	3	Alexandra DeLoof	United States	1:01.17	
5	6	Fernanda de Goeij	Brazil	1:01.59	
6	1	Madison Broad	Canada	1:02.44	
7	2	Carmen Marquez Orellana	El Salvador	1:03.07	
8	8	Krystal Lara Garzon	Dominican Republic	1:03.18	
