= Modern pentathlon at the 2011 Pan American Games – Qualification =

There is a quota of 40 athletes (24 male, 16 female) (however one spot over quota for each gender was allowed); Mexico as the host country is guaranteed a full team of four athletes (two men and two women). Qualification is done on a country basis, not an individual basis.

== Qualification summary ==
Nation	Men	Women	Total
Argentina	2	2	4
Brazil	2	2	4
Canada	2	2	4
Chile	2	1	3
Cuba	2	2	4
Dominican Republic	2		2
Ecuador	2	1	3
Guatemala	2	2	4
Mexico	2	2	4
Panama	2		2
United States	2	2	4
Uruguay	1		1
Venezuela	2	1	3
Total athletes	25	17	42
Total NOCs	13	10	13

== Men ==
Competition	Location	Vacancies	Qualified
Host	-	2	Mexico; Mexico
Each country affiliated with PAMPC	(Brazil) Rio de Janeiro*	11*	United States; Cuba; Brazil; Guatemala; Canada; Ecuador; Chile; Argentina; Dominican Republic; Venezuela; Panama
2010 Pan American Championship **	(Brazil) Rio de Janeiro	6**	United States; Brazil; Cuba; Canada; Guatemala; Ecuador
UIPM World Ranking List	-	5	Argentina; Chile; Dominican Republic; Uruguay; Venezuela; Panama
TOTAL		25	

* Each country affiliated with PAMPC can send one athlete if they met the qualifying standard of 4800 points.

** The remaining spots were distributed to nations in the order of their second-placed athlete (must have met the standard of 4800 points).

== Women ==
Competition	Location	Vacancies	Qualified
Host	-	2	Mexico; Mexico
Each country affiliated with PAMPC	(Brazil) Rio de Janeiro*	6*	Brazil; United States; Canada; Guatemala; Cuba; Argentina
2010 Pan American Championship **	(Brazil) Rio de Janeiro	4**	Brazil; Canada; Cuba; United States; Guatemala
UIPM World Ranking List	-	4	Argentina; Chile; Ecuador; Venezuela
TOTAL		17	

* Each country affiliated with PAMPC can send one athlete if they met the qualifying standard of 4200 points.

** The remaining spots were distributed to nations in the order of their second-placed athletes (must have met the standard of 4200 points).
