= Shooting at the 2015 Pan American Games – Men's 10 metre air pistol =

Shooting – Men's 10 metre air pistol at the 2015 Pan American Games
- Venue: Pan Am Shooting Centre
- Dates: July 12
- Competitors: 31 from 19 nations
- Winning score: 201.8

Medalists
Gold medal	Felipe Almeida Wu	Brazil
Silver medal	Jay Shi	United States
Bronze medal	Mario Vinueza	Ecuador

The men's 10 metre air pistol shooting event at the 2015 Pan American Games will be held on July 12 at the Pan Am Shooting Centre in Innisfil.

The event consisted of two rounds: a qualifier and a final. In the qualifier, each shooter fired 60 shots with an air pistol at 10 metres distance. Scores for each shot were in increments of 1, with a maximum score of 10.

The top 8 shooters in the qualifying round moved on to the final round. There, they fired an additional 10 shots. These shots scored in increments of .1, with a maximum score of 10.9. The total score from all 70 shots was used to determine final ranking.

The winners of all fifteen events, along with the runner up in the men's air rifle, skeet, trap and both women's rifle events will qualify for the 2016 Summer Olympics in Rio de Janeiro, Brazil (granted the athlete has not yet earned a quota for their country).

== Schedule ==
All times are Eastern Daylight Time (UTC−4).

Date	Time	Round
July 12, 2015	9:15	Qualification
July 12, 2015	13:00	Final

== Results ==
=== Qualification round ===
Rank	Athlete	Country	1	2	3	4	5	6	Total	Notes
1	David Munoz	Panama	93	95	99	95	98	97	577-18x	Q
2	Felipe Almeida Wu	Brazil	98	95	94	97	97	95	576-18x	Q
3	Júlio Almeida	Brazil	97	91	94	99	99	96	576-15x	Q
4	Mario Vinueza	Ecuador	98	93	97	98	92	95	573-14x	Q
5	Jay Shi	United States	93	93	96	96	98	95	571-16x	Q
6	Giovanni González Rivera	Puerto Rico	96	96	94	93	97	94	570-17x	Q
7	Marcos Núñez	Venezuela	98	96	95	95	93	93	570-12x	Q
8	Manuel Sánchez	Chile	93	96	95	94	95	95	568-17x	Q
9	Nick Mowrer	United States	95	96	96	94	94	93	568-17x	
10	Jorge Grau	Cuba	96	95	94	94	96	93	568-16x	
11	Marko Carrillo	Peru	98	92	96	90	95	96	567-16x	
12	Rafael Lacayo	Nicaragua	93	94	92	95	98	94	566-15x	
13	Fernando Pozo Neira	Ecuador	95	91	94	95	95	95	565-11x	
14	Felipe Beuvrín	Venezuela	93	95	93	95	94	93	563-15x	
15	Roger Daniel	Trinidad and Tobago	93	94	96	90	96	94	563-12x	
16	Maurilio Morales	Mexico	96	94	92	96	91	94	563-10x	
17	Rudolf Knijnenburg	Bolivia	91	93	96	94	96	92	562-16x	
18	Guillermo Pias	Cuba	90	98	98	91	92	92	561-13x	
19	Jorge Pimentel	El Salvador	96	92	93	92	91	96	560-15x	
20	Mario Gutierrez	Mexico	94	94	92	91	95	94	560-12x	
21	Allan Harding	Canada	96	89	96	93	91	94	559-16x	
22	Josue Hernandez Caba	Dominican Republic	91	91	93	96	93	95	559-08x	
23	Alex Peralta Enciso	Colombia	94	90	91	96	92	94	557-10x	
24	Hermes Barahona	El Salvador	91	93	92	94	92	94	556-10x	
25	Mark Hynes	Canada	92	90	94	91	94	94	555-11x	
26	Jose Castillo Aguilar	Guatemala	93	92	94	96	90	90	555-09x	
27	Sebastian Lobo	Argentina	92	94	90	92	94	93	555-06x	
28	Enrique Arnaez	Peru	91	94	92	96	93	87	553-05x	
29	Romeo Cruz Lemus	Guatemala	89	92	96	90	90	91	548-07x	
30	Francisco Yanisselly	Panama	89	92	92	92	90	92	547-12x	
31	Manuel Aburto Espinales	Nicaragua	90	91	87	89	94	96	547-07x	

=== Final ===
Rank	Athlete	Country	1	2	3	4	5	6	7	8	9	Total	Notes
1st place, gold medalist(s)	Felipe Almeida Wu	Brazil	29.0; 8.6; 10.4; 10.0	60.4; 10.6; 10.5; 10.3	79.1; 9.8; 8.9	98.5; 9.9; 9.5	119.6; 10.6; 10.5	140.5; 10.2; 10.7	161.0; 10.5; 10.0	181.5; 10.5; 10.0	201.8; 10.0; 10.3	201.8	FPR
2nd place, silver medalist(s)	Jay Shi	United States	30.2; 10.1; 9.3; 10.8	60.7; 9.6; 10.6; 10.3	78.1; 7.6; 9.8	97.2; 9.3; 9.8	117.3; 9.8; 10.3	138.6; 10.4; 10.9	159.2; 10.5; 10.1	179.0; 10.0; 9.8	199.0; 10.3; 9.7	199.0	
3rd place, bronze medalist(s)	Mario Vinueza	Ecuador	28.6; 9.5; 9.5; 9.6	58.3; 9.2; 10.0; 10.5	78.9; 10.6; 10.0	98.2; 10.2; 9.1	117.7; 9.5; 10.0	138.2; 10.1; 10.4	158.0; 10.2; 9.6	176.3; 8.5; 9.8	176.3	176.3	
4	Giovanni González Rivera	Puerto Rico	29.8; 10.3; 9.8; 9.7	59.2; 10.4; 8.3; 10.7	77.4; 7.7; 10.5	96.6; 10.2; 9.0	116.5; 10.0; 9.9	135.7; 10.3; 8.9	155.7; 10.7; 9.3	155.7	155.7	155.7	
5	Manuel Sánchez	Chile	28.7; 9.0; 9.6; 10.1	57.3; 9.1; 9.5; 10.0	77.4; 10.9; 9.2	96.5; 10.4; 8.7	115.8; 10.3; 9.0	133.4; 8.6; 9.0	133.4	133.4	133.4	133.4	
6	David Muñoz	Panama	27.7; 9.0; 9.1; 9.6	57.7; 10.1; 9.1; 10.8	76.1; 9.0; 9.4	96.4; 9.9; 10.4	114.7; 10.1; 8.2	114.7	114.7	114.7	114.7	114.7	
7	Júlio Almeida	Brazil	30.4; 10.0; 10.2; 10.2	59.7; 9.9; 9.6; 9.8	78.3; 8.7; 9.9	95.1; 9.2; 7.6	95.1	95.1	95.1	95.1	95.1	95.1	
8	Marcos Núñez	Venezuela	26.7; 10.1; 8.3; 8.3	55.2; 8.5; 10.3; 9.7	75.5; 9.8; 10.5	75.5	75.5	75.5	75.5	75.5	75.5	75.5	
