= Fencing at the 2019 Pan American Games – Women's sabre =

Women's sabre at the 2019 Pan American Games
- Venue: Lima Convention Centre
- Dates: August 6
- Competitors: 18 from 10 nations

Medalists
Gold medal	Anne-Elizabeth Stone; United States
Silver medal	María Belén Pérez Maurice; Argentina
Bronze medal	Alejandra Benítez; Venezuela
Bronze medal	Gabriella Page; Canada

The women's sabre competition of the fencing events at the 2019 Pan American Games was held on August 6 at the Lima Convention Centre.

The sabre competition consisted of a qualification round followed by a single-elimination bracket with a bronze medal match between the two semifinal losers. Fencing was done to 15 touches or to the completion of three three-minute rounds if neither fencer reached 15 touches by then. At the end of time, the higher-scoring fencer was the winner; a tie resulted in an additional one-minute sudden-death time period. This sudden-death period was further modified by the selection of a draw-winner beforehand; if neither fencer scored a touch during the minute, the predetermined draw-winner won the bout.

== Schedule ==
Date	Time	Round
August 6, 2019	11:30	Qualification pools
August 6, 2019	13:30	Round of 16
August 6, 2019	14:30	Quarterfinals
August 6, 2019	16:30	Semifinals
August 6, 2019	18:45	Final

== Results ==
The following are the results of the event.

=== Qualification ===
All 18 fencers were put into three groups of six athletes, were each fencer would have five individual matches. The top 14 athletes overall would qualify for next round.

Rank	Name	Nation	Victories	TG	TR	Dif.	Notes
1	Alejandra Benítez	Venezuela	5	25	11	+14	Q
2	Anne-Elizabeth Stone	United States	5	25	13	+12	Q
3	Gabriella Page	Canada	4	23	11	+11	Q
4	María Belén Pérez Maurice	Argentina	4	23	13	+10	Q
5	Heyddys Valentín	Dominican Republic	4	22	15	+7	Q
6	Eileen Grench	Panama	3	21	14	+7	Q
7	Natalia Botello	Mexico	3	16	16	0	Q
8	Shia Rodríguez	Venezuela	3	17	20	-3	Q
9	María Blanco	Colombia	2	19	18	+1	Q
10	María Perroni	Argentina	2	17	18	-1	Q
11	Vanesa Infante	Mexico	2	16	17	-1	Q
12	Aymara Tablada	Cuba	2	17	19	-2	Q
13	Chloe Fox-Gitomer	United States	2	14	16	-2	Q
14	Marissa Ponich	Canada	2	12	19	-7	Q
15	Rossy Félix	Dominican Republic	1	16	21	-5	
16	Jessica Morales Linares	Colombia	1	15	21	-6	
17	Raisza Lucho	Peru	0	9	25	-16	
18	Hillary Aguilar	Peru	0	6	25	-19	

=== Elimination round ===
Round of 16
9	María Blanco (COL)	15
8	Shia Rodríguez (VEN)	9
5	Heyddys Valentín (DOM)	11
12	Aymara Tablada (CUB)	15
13	Chloe Fox-Gitomer (USA)	13
4	María Belén Pérez Maurice (ARG)	15
3	Gabriella Page (CAN)	15
14	Marissa Ponich (CAN)	9
11	Vanesa Infante (MEX)	8
6	Eileen Grench (PAN)	15
7	Natalia Botello (MEX)	11
10	María Perroni (ARG)	15

Quarterfinals
1	Alejandra Benítez (VEN)	15
9	María Blanco (COL)	7
12	Aymara Tablada (CUB)	12
4	María Belén Pérez Maurice (ARG)	15
3	Gabriella Page (CAN)	15
6	Eileen Grench (PAN)	13
10	María Perroni (ARG)	5
2	Anne-Elizabeth Stone (USA)	15

Semifinals
1	Alejandra Benítez (VEN)	13
4	María Belén Pérez Maurice (ARG)	15
3	Gabriella Page (CAN)	10
2	Anne-Elizabeth Stone (USA)	15

Final
4	María Belén Pérez Maurice (ARG)	13
2	Anne-Elizabeth Stone (USA)	15
