= Brad Balsley =

American sports shooter

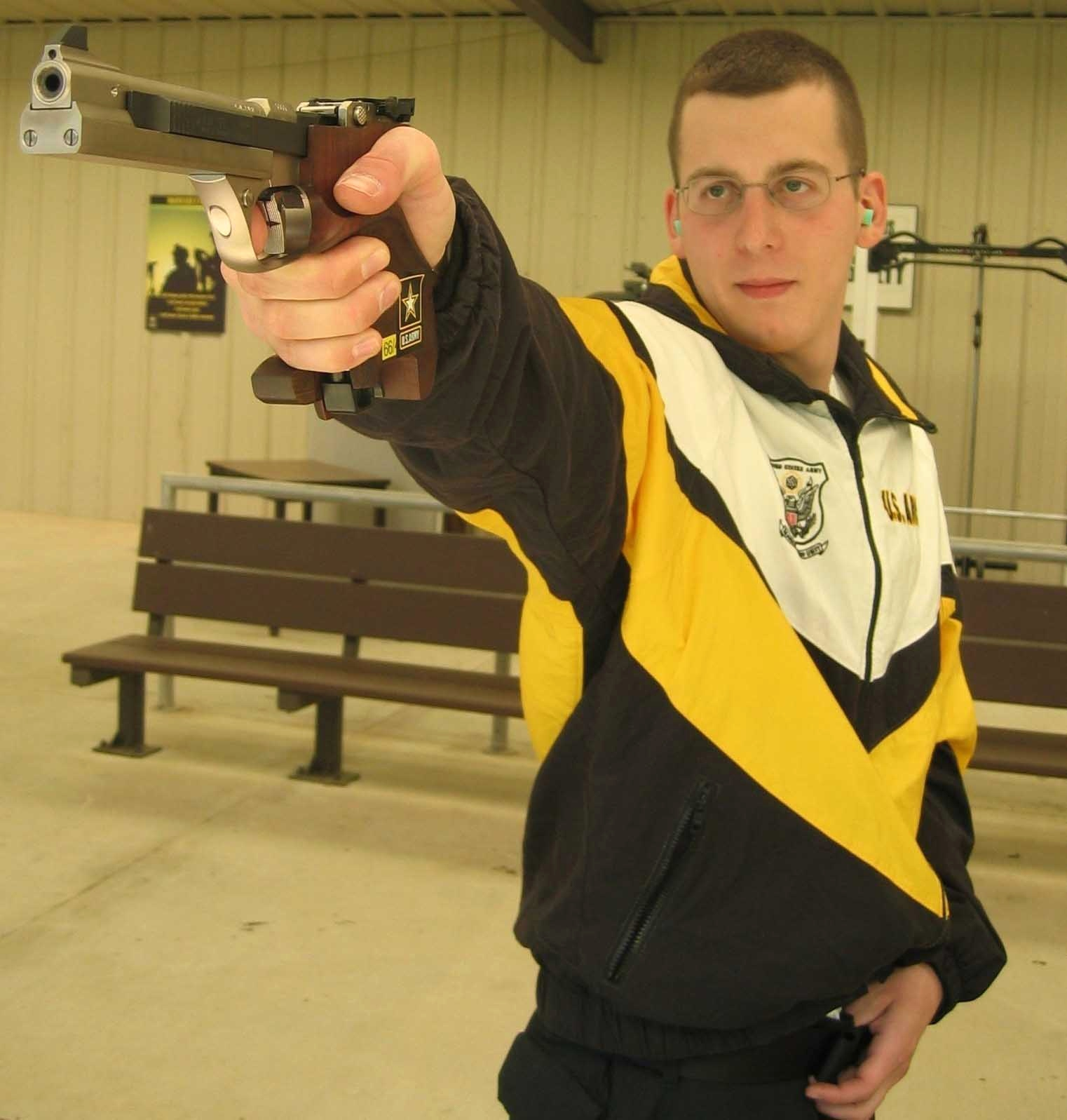
- Balsley in 2008

Personal information
- Born: May 26, 1988 (age 38) Uniontown, Pennsylvania, U.S.

Sport
- Sport: Shooting
- Events: 25 meter rapid fire pistol 25 meter center-fire pistol
- Club: U.S. Army
- Coached by: Vladimir Chichkou (personal); Sergey Luzov (national)
Medal record
Representing the United States
Pan American Games
| Gold medal – first place | 2015 Toronto | 25 m rapid fire pistol |

Brad Balsley (May 26, 1988) is an American sports shooter who specialized in the 25 meter rapid fire pistol and 25 meter center-fire pistol events. He won gold medals at the 2015 Pan American Games and 2010 and 2014 American championships.

Balsley took up shooting in 1994 and started competing in 2007. In 2008 he placed second at the 2008 IPSC Handgun World Shoot as a junior and eighth as a senior.
