= Shamek Pietucha =

Canadian swimmer

Personal information
- Full name: Przemyslaw Shamek Pietucha
- National team: Canada
- Born: August 24, 1976 Malbork, Poland
- Died: October 10, 2015 (aged 39) Delhi, India
- Height: 1.90 m (6 ft 3 in)
- Weight: 86 kg (190 lb)

Sport
- Sport: Swimming
- Strokes: Butterfly
- Club: Calgary Swim Club
- College team: University of Virginia
Medal record
Men's swimming
Representing Canada
World Championships (SC)
Silver medal – second place	2000 Athens	200 m butterfly
Pan American Games
Gold medal – first place	1999 Winnipeg	200 m butterfly
Silver medal – second place	1999 Winnipeg	100 m butterfly
Bronze medal – third place	1999 Winnipeg	4x100 m medley
Universiade
Silver medal – second place	1997 Messina	100 m butterfly
Bronze medal – third place	1997 Messina	200 m butterfly

Przemyslaw Shamek Pietucha (August 24, 1976 – October 10, 2015) was a Polish-born Canadian swimmer who represented Canada in international competition at the Summer Olympics, FINA World Championships and Pan American Games. Pietucha was a butterfly specialist who won six medals in major international championships.

He was born in Malbork, Poland, but grew up in Calgary, Alberta, where he began competitive swimming.

Pietucha accepted an athletic scholarship to attend the University of Virginia (UVa) in Charlottesville, Virginia, where he swam for the Virginia Cavaliers swimming and diving team in National Collegiate Athletic Association (NCAA) and Atlantic Coast Conference (ACC) competition from 1996 to 1999. During his four-year college career, he received nine All-American honours, was chosen team captain as a senior, and won the NCAA national title in the 200-yard butterfly in 1999.

While swimming collegiately for Virginia, Pietucha was also a member of the Canadian national swim team. He won silver and bronze medals in the 100- and 200-metre butterfly events, respectively, at the 1997 World University Games. Two years later at the 1999 Pan American Games in Winnipeg, he won a gold medal in the 200-metre butterfly, a silver in the 100-metre butterfly, and a bronze as a member of Canada's third-place team in the 4x100-metre medley relay.

After graduating from UVa, he finished second in the 200-metre butterfly at the 2000 Short Course World Championships, and qualified as a member of the Canadian Olympic team in 2000. At the 2000 Summer Olympics in Athens, he competed in the preliminary heats of the 100- and 200-metre butterfly events, but did not advance. He also swam for the 6th place Canadian relay team in the qualifying heats of the 4x100-metre medley, but not in the final.

Up until his death in 2015, Pietucha was a practicing integrative medicine physician in Canada.

He died suddenly on 10 October 2015 after a brief illness at the beginning of a sabbatical he had taken to study yoga in India.

His other accomplishments included:

- 2000 World Cup VI gold medallist, 200-metre butterfly, Hobart, Australia
- 1999 World Cup II gold medallist, 100- and 200-metre butterfly, Edmonton, Alberta
- 1998 U.S. Open champion, 100- and 200-metre butterfly, Indianapolis, Indiana
- Canadian national record-holder, 200-metre butterfly
- Six-time Canadian national champion

== See also ==
- List of Commonwealth Games medallists in swimming (men)
- List of University of Virginia people
