= Panama at the 2007 Pan American Games =

- IOC code: PAN
- NOC: Comité Olímpico de Panamá
- Website: www.conpanama.org

in Rio de Janeiro 13–29 July 2007
- Competitors: 70 in 12 sports
- Flag bearer: Irving Saladino
- Medals Ranked 17th: Gold 1 Silver 1 Bronze 0 Total 2

Pan American Games appearances (overview)
- 1951; 1955; 1959; 1963; 1967; 1971; 1975; 1979; 1983; 1987; 1991; 1995; 1999; 2003; 2007; 2011; 2015; 2019; 2023

The 15th Pan American Games were held in Rio de Janeiro, Brazil from 13 July 2007 to 29 July 2007. Panama competed with a total number of 70 (48 men and 22 women) athletes in 12 sports.

== Medals ==
=== Gold ===
===== Athletics =====
- Men's Long Jump: Irving Saladino

=== Silver ===
===== Athletics =====
- Men's 400m Hurdles: Bayano Kamani

== Results by event ==
=== Basketball ===
==== Men's team competition ====
- Team roster

- Joel Muñoz
- Jair Jamel Peralta
- Danilo Pinnock
- Maximiliano Gómez Torres
- Jamaal Levy
- Jorsua Chambers
- Reyjavick Degracia
- Eduardo Isaac
- Dionisio Gomez
- Joel Isaac Tesis
- José Lloreda
- Desmond Smith

- Head coach: Vincente Duncan

== See also ==
- Panama at the 2008 Summer Olympics
