= Swimming at the 1999 Pan American Games =

- Venue: Pan Am Pool
- Dates: August 2–7

The Swimming competition at the 1999 Pan American Games took place in the Pan Am Pool in Winnipeg, Manitoba, Canada, from August 2–7, 1999.

In 32 events, the USA team won 10 golds, 7 by the women: the last time either the U.S. men's or women's team won fewer than ten golds was 1963, when there were only eight events for each. But the U.S. didn't send its very best to Winnipeg. That honor went to the team that headed for Sydney, Australia at the 1999 Pan Pacific Swimming Championships.

Two swimmers won the first medals of their countries in swimming at Pan American Games at all times: Eileen Coparropa for Panama, and Janelle Atkinson for Jamaica.

== Results ==
=== Men's events ===
| Event | Gold | | Silver | | Bronze | |
|---|---|---|---|---|---|---|
| 50 m freestyle | Fernando Scherer; Brazil | 22.24 | José Meolans; Argentina | 22.46 | Marcos Hernández; Cuba | 22.79 |
| 100 m freestyle | Fernando Scherer; Brazil | 49.19; GR | José Meolans; Argentina | 49.94 | Gustavo Borges; Brazil | 50.10 |
| 200 m freestyle | Gustavo Borges; Brazil | 1:49.41 | Scott Tucker; United States | 1:50.99 | Leonardo Costa; Brazil; Mark Johnston; Canada | 1:51.29 |
| 400 m freestyle | Luiz Lima; Brazil | 3:52.25; SA | Austin Ramirez; United States | 3:53.64 | Rick Say; Canada | 3:54.66 |
| 1500 m freestyle | Tim Siciliano; United States | 15:14.94 | Luiz Lima; Brazil | 15:21.92 | Ricardo Monasterio; Venezuela | 15:28.64 |
| 100 m backstroke | Rodolfo Falcón; Cuba | 54.93 | Alexandre Massura; Brazil | 55.17; SA | Matt Allen; United States | 55.86 |
| 200 m backstroke | Leonardo Costa; Brazil | 1:59.33; GR, SA | Aaron Peirsol; United States | 1:59.77 | Dan Shevchik; United States | 2:00.27 |
| 100 m breaststroke | Ed Moses; United States | 1:00.99; GR | Jarrod Marrs; United States; Morgan Knabe; Canada | 1:02.11 | none | |
| 200 m breaststroke | Morgan Knabe; Canada | 2:14.73; GR | Steve West; United States | 2:16.26 | Mark Gangloff; United States | 2:16.60 |
| 100 m butterfly | Francisco Sánchez; Venezuela | 53.33; GR | Shamek Pietucha; Canada | 53.40 | José Meolans; Argentina | 54.03 |
| 200 m butterfly | Shamek Pietucha; Canada | 1:59.10 | Steven Brown; United States | 1:59.52 | Devin Howard; United States | 1:59.82 |
| 200 m individual medley | Curtis Myden; Canada | 2:02.38 | Joe Montague; United States | 2:03.08 | Owen von Richter; Canada | 2:03.80 |
| 400 m individual medley | Curtis Myden; Canada | 4:15.52; GR | Eric Donnelly; United States | 4:17.86 | Owen von Richter; Canada | 4:19.62 |
| 4 × 100 m freestyle relay | Brazil; Fernando Scherer; César Quintaes; André Cordeiro; Gustavo Borges | 3:17.18; GR, SA | United States; Scott Tucker; Dan Phillips; Jarod Schroeder; Justin Ewers | 3:19.00 | Venezuela; Luis Rojas; Francisco Páez; José Quevedo; Francisco Sánchez | 3:22.21 |
| 4 × 200 m freestyle relay | United States; Adam Messner; Dan Phillips; Devin Howard; Scott Tucker | 7:22.29 | Brazil; Leonardo Costa; Rodrigo Castro; André Cordeiro; Gustavo Borges | 7:22.92; SA | Canada; Mark Johnston; Brian Johns; Yannick Lupien; Rick Say | 7:23.02 |
| 4 × 100 m medley relay | Brazil; Alexandre Massura; Marcelo Tomazini; Fernando Scherer; Gustavo Borges | 3:40.27; GR, SA | United States; Matt Allen; Ed Moses; Jarod Schroeder; Scott Tucker | 3:40.57 | Canada; Mark Versfeld; Morgan Knabe; Shamek Pietucha; Yannick Lupien | 3:41.04 |

=== Women’s events ===
| Event | Gold | | Silver | | Bronze | |
|---|---|---|---|---|---|---|
| 50 m freestyle | Tammie Spatz; United States | 25.50 | Eileen Coparropa; Panama | 25.78 | Laura Nicholls; Canada | 26.10 |
| 100 m freestyle | Laura Nicholls; Canada | 56.25 | Tammie Spatz; United States | 56.44 | Marianne Limpert; Canada | 56.69 |
| 200 m freestyle | Jessica Deglau; Canada | 2:00.65 | Janelle Atkinson; Jamaica | 2:01.11 | Talor Bendel; United States | 2:03.18 |
| 400 m freestyle | Kaitlin Sandeno; United States | 4:10.74 | Janelle Atkinson; Jamaica | 4:10.83 | Joanne Malar; Canada | 4:12.64 |
| 800 m freestyle | Kaitlin Sandeno; United States | 8:34.65; GR | Janelle Atkinson; Jamaica | 8:39.51 | Lindsay Beavers; Canada | 8:44.21 |
| 100 m backstroke | Kelly Stefanyshyn; Canada | 1:02.14 | Denali Knapp; United States | 1:02.45 | Beth Botsford; United States | 1:02.48 |
| 200 m backstroke | Denali Knapp; United States | 2:12.48; GR | Beth Botsford; United States | 2:12.95 | Kelly Stefanyshyn; Canada | 2:13.24 |
| 100 m breaststroke | Staciana Stitts; United States | 1:09.16; GR | Kristen Woodring; United States | 1:09.65 | Lauren van Oosten; Canada | 1:10.06 |
| 200 m breaststroke | Lauren van Oosten; Canada | 2:30.36 | Annemieke McReynolds; United States | 2:30.53 | Katie Yevak; United States | 2:32.85 |
| 100 m butterfly | Karen Campbell; United States | 1:00.05 | Jessica Deglau; Canada | 1:00.70 | Karine Chevrier; Canada | 1:01.15 |
| 200 m butterfly | Jessica Deglau; Canada | 2:09.64; GR | Jennifer Button; Canada | 2:12.09 | Kalyn Keller; United States | 2:14.60 |
| 200 m individual medley | Joanne Malar; Canada | 2:14.18; GR | Maggie Bowen; United States | 2:15.26 | Marianne Limpert; Canada | 2:15.80 |
| 400 m individual medley | Joanne Malar; Canada | 4:38.46; GR | Maggie Bowen; United States | 4:49.22 | Carolyn Adel; Suriname | 4:50.41 |
| 4 × 100 m freestyle relay | Canada; Jessica Deglau; Marianne Limpert; Sarah Evanetz; Laura Nicholls | 3:45.07 | United States; Tammie Spatz; Courtney Shealy; Stefanie Williams; Jen Eberwien | 3:45.72 | Brazil; Juliana Machado; Rebeca Gusmão; Flávia Delaroli; Tatiana Lima | 3:50.37 |
| 4 × 200 m freestyle relay | Canada; Jessica Deglau; Joanne Malar; Marianne Limpert; Laura Nicholls | 8:05.56 | United States; Caroline Geehr; Julia Stowers; Megan Melgaard; Talor Bendel | 8:07.18 | Brazil; Monique Ferreira; Nayara Ribeiro; Tatiana Lemos; Ana Muniz | 8:25.07 |
| 4 × 100 m medley relay | United States; Denali Knapp; Staciana Stitts; Karen Campbell; Tammie Spatz | 4:06.08; GR | Canada; Kelly Stefanyshyn; Lauren van Oosten; Jessica Deglau; Laura Nicholls | 4:08.73 | Brazil; Fabíola Molina; Tanya Schuh; Patrícia Comini; Tatiana Lemos | 4:15.00 |

=== Medal table ===
| Rank | Nation | Gold | Silver | Bronze | Total |
|---|---|---|---|---|---|
| 1 | Canada | 13 | 5 | 14 | 32 |
| 2 | United States | 10 | 19 | 8 | 37 |
| 3 | Brazil | 7 | 3 | 5 | 15 |
| 4 | Venezuela | 1 | 0 | 2 | 3 |
| 5 | Cuba | 1 | 0 | 1 | 2 |
| 6 | Jamaica | 0 | 3 | 0 | 3 |
| 7 | Argentina | 0 | 2 | 1 | 3 |
| 8 | Panama | 0 | 1 | 0 | 1 |
| 9 | Suriname | 0 | 0 | 1 | 1 |
| Totals (9 entries) | | 32 | 33 | 32 | 97 |
