= Panama at the 2003 Pan American Games =

- IOC code: PAN
- NOC: Comité Olímpico de Panamá
- Website: www.conpanama.org

in Santo Domingo 1–17 August 2003
- Medals Ranked 26th: Gold 0 Silver 0 Bronze 2 Total 2

Pan American Games appearances (overview)
- 1951; 1955; 1959; 1963; 1967; 1971; 1975; 1979; 1983; 1987; 1991; 1995; 1999; 2003; 2007; 2011; 2015; 2019; 2023; 2027

The 14th Pan American Games were held in Santo Domingo, Dominican Republic from August 1 to August 17, 2003.

== Medals ==
=== Bronze ===
===== Fencing =====
- Women's Épée: Jesika Jiménez

===== Swimming =====
- Women's 50 m Freestyle: Eileen Coparropa

== Results by event ==
=== Swimming ===
==== Men's Competition ====
Athlete	Event	Heat		Final	
Athlete	Event	Time	Rank	Time	Rank
Ismael Ortiz	50 m freestyle	23.97	19	did not advance	
Ismael Ortiz	100 m freestyle	52.34	20	52.01	15

==== Women's Competition ====
Athlete	Event	Heat		Final	
Athlete	Event	Time	Rank	Time	Rank
Eileen Coparropa	50 m freestyle	25.85	3	25.62	3rd place, bronze medalist(s)
Eileen Coparropa	100 m freestyle	55.98	1	56.58	5

== See also ==
- Panama at the 2002 Central American and Caribbean Games
- Panama at the 2004 Summer Olympics
