= Swimming at the 2003 Pan American Games – Women's 50 metre freestyle =

The Women's 50m Freestyle event at the 2003 Pan American Games took place on August 17, 2003 (Day 16 of the Games).

== Medalists ==
| Gold | Kara Lynn Joyce; United States |
| Silver | Flávia Delaroli; Brazil |
| Bronze | Eileen Coparropa; Panama |

== Records ==
| Record | Athlete | Time | Date | Venue |
|---|---|---|---|---|
| World Record | Inge de Bruijn (NED) | 24.13 | 2000-09-22 | Sydney, Australia |
| Pan Am Record | Angel Martino (USA) | 25.40 | 1995-03-17 | Mar del Plata, Argentina |

== Results ==
| Place | Swimmer | Heats | | Final |
| Place | Swimmer | Time | Rank | Time |
|---|---|---|---|---|
| 1 | Kara Lynn Joyce (USA) | 25.29 GR | 1 | 25.24 GR |
| 2 | Flávia Delaroli (BRA) | 25.69 | 2 | 25.44 |
| 3 | Eileen Coparropa (PAN) | 25.85 | 3 | 25.62 |
| 4 | Arlene Semeco (VEN) | 26.31 | 5 | 25.77 |
| 5 | Colleen Lanné (USA) | 26.10 | 4 | 25.84 |
| 6 | Florencia Szigeti (ARG) | 26.61 | 6 | 26.39 |
| 7 | Sharntelle McLean (TRI) | 26.92 | 8 | 26.82 |
| 8 | Rebeca Gusmão (BRA) | 26.81 | 7 | 26.85 |
| 9 | Alia Atkinson (JAM) | 27.35 | 13 | 26.86 |
| 10 | Linda McEachrane (TRI) | 27.33 | 12 | 26.90 |
| 11 | Angela Chuck (JAM) | 27.13 | 10 | 26.91 |
| 12 | Danielle de Alba (MEX) | 27.12 | 9 | 26.93 |
| 13 | Yamile Bahamonde (ECU) | 27.30 | 11 | 27.04 |
| 14 | Nikia Deveaux (BAH) | 27.42 | 16 | 27.38 |
| 15 | Elizabeth Collins (CAN) | 27.41 | 15 | 27.40 |
| 16 | Melanie Slowing (GUA) | 27.36 | 14 | 27.62 |
| 17 | Maria Wong (PER) | 27.46 | 17 | |
| 18 | Diana López (VEN) | 27.51 | 18 | |
| 19 | Marianella Marín (CRC) | 27.52 | 19 | |
| 20 | Carolina Moreno (MEX) | 27.56 | 20 | |
| 21 | Silvie Ketelaars (AHO) | 27.72 | 21 | |
| 22 | Maya Beaudry (CAN) | 27.81 | 22 | |
| 23 | Roshendra Vrolijk (ARU) | 28.13 | 23 | |
| 24 | Kiera Aitken (BER) | 28.16 | 24 | |
| 25 | Patricia Jimenez (PUR) | 28.52 | 25 | |
| 26 | Carolina Regalado (DOM) | 28.62 | 26 | |

== See also ==
- Swimming at the 2004 Summer Olympics – Women's 50 metre freestyle
