= Panama at the 2023 Pan American Games =

- IOC code: PAN
- NOC: Panama Olympic Committee

in Santiago, Chile 20 October 2023 – 5 November 2023
- Competitors: 51 in 12 sports
- Flag bearers (opening): Davis Romero & Hillary Heron
- Flag bearers (closing): Alberto Gálvez & Laura Restrepo
- Medals Ranked 16th: Gold 2 Silver 1 Bronze 5 Total 8

Pan American Games appearances (overview)
- 1951; 1955; 1959; 1963; 1967; 1971; 1975; 1979; 1983; 1987; 1991; 1995; 1999; 2003; 2007; 2011; 2015; 2019; 2023; 2027

Panama is scheduled to compete at the 2023 Pan American Games in Santiago, Chile from October 20 to November 5, 2023. This was Panama's 19th appearance at the Pan American Games, having competed at every edition of the games.

Baseball player Davis Romero and artistic gymnast Hillary Heron were the country's flagbearers during the opening ceremony. Meanwhile, karateka Alberto Gálvez and golfer Laura Restrepo were the country's flagbearers during the closing ceremony.

== Competitors ==
The following is the list of number of competitors (per gender) participating at the games per sport/discipline.

Sport	Men	Women	Total
Baseball	24	0	24
Basketball	12	0	12
Boxing	3	2	5
Cycling	1	0	1
Equestrian			2
Fencing	0	1	1
Gymnastics	1	5	6
Judo	1	2	3
Karate	1	0	1
Shooting	4	0	4
Surfing	4	1	5
Taekwondo	0	1	1
Triathlon	1	0	1
Weightlifting	1	1	2
Wrestling	1	2	3
Total	54	15	69

== Medalists ==
The following Panamanian competitors won medals at the games. In the by discipline sections below, medalists' names are bolded.

Medal	Name	Sport	Event	Date
Gold	Donald Lee; William Duen	Bowling	Men's doubles	November 2
Gold	Gianna Woodruff	Athletics	Women's 400 metres hurdles	November 3
Silver	Atheyna Bylon	Boxing	Women's 75 kg	October 27
Bronze	Carolena Carstens	Taekwondo	Women's 57 kg	October 22
Bronze	Eduardo Beckford	Boxing	Men's 71 kg	October 26
Bronze	Lilian Cordones	Judo	Women's 52 kg	October 28
Bronze	Kristine Jiménez	Judo	Women's 57 kg	October 28
Bronze	Alberto Gálvez	Karate	Men's 67 kg	November 5

== Baseball ==
Summary

Team	Event	Preliminary round				Semifinal	Final / BM / Pl.	
Team	Event	Opposition Result	Opposition Result	Opposition Result	Rank	Opposition Result	Opposition Result	Rank
Dominican Republic men	Men's tournament	Dominican Republic	Chile	Mexico				

Panama qualified a team of 24 athletes by winning the 2023 Pan American Games Qualifying tournament in Buenos Aires, Argentina. The team was officially announced on October 3, 2023.

Roster

- Erasmo Caballero
- Adolfo Reina
- Carlos Sánchez
- Jorge Bishop
- Edgar Muñoz
- Jason Paterson
- Jhadiel Santamaría
- Gertrudis Tello
- Eduardo Thomas
- Enoc Watt
- José Murdock
- Abraham Rodríguez
- Jhony Santos
- Luis Castillo
- Harold Araúz
- Manuel Campos
- Julio Denis
- Steven Fuentes
- Severino González
- Luis Machuca
- Luis Ramos
- Carlos Rodríguez
- Davis Romero
- Abdiel Saldaña

Group A

Pos	Team	Pld	W	L	RF	RA	PCT	GB	Qualification
1	Panama	3	3	0	18	3	**1.000**	—	Super Round
2	Mexico	3	2	1	19	8	**.667**	1	Super Round
3	Dominican Republic	3	1	2	13	7	**.333**	2	Fifth place game
4	Chile (H)	3	0	3	2	34	**.000**	3	Seventh place game

Source: Santiago 2023 and WBSC Americas
(H) Hosts

October 19; 9:30	Panama	**4–1**	Dominican Republic	Parque Bicentenario de Cerrillos, Cerrillos
October 19; 9:30		Boxscore		Parque Bicentenario de Cerrillos, Cerrillos

October 21; 15:00	Chile	**0–6**	Panama	Parque Bicentenario de Cerrillos, Cerrillos
October 21; 15:00		Boxscore		Parque Bicentenario de Cerrillos, Cerrillos

October 23; 9:30	Panama	**8–2**	Mexico	Parque Bicentenario de Cerrillos, Cerrillos
October 23; 9:30		Boxscore		Parque Bicentenario de Cerrillos, Cerrillos

== Basketball ==
5x5

Summary

Team	Event	Group stage				Semifinal	Final / BM / Pl.	
Team	Event	Opposition Result	Opposition Result	Opposition Result	Rank	Opposition Result	Opposition Result	Rank
Argentina men	Men's tournament	Dominican Republic	Argentina	Venezuela				

=== Men's tournament ===
Panama qualified a men's team (of 12 athletes) after finishing 11th at the 2022 FIBA Americup and receiving a reallocated spot.

Group A

Pos	Team	Pld	W	L	PF	PA	PD	Pts	Qualification
1	Argentina	3	3	0	262	246	+16	**6**	Semifinals
2	Venezuela	3	2	1	257	253	+4	**5**	Semifinals
3	Dominican Republic	3	1	2	252	227	+25	**4**	Fifth place game
4	Panama	3	0	3	198	243	−45	**3**	Seventh place game

Source: Santiago 2023

31 October 2023
13:00

Boxscore

**Dominican Republic**	**81**–53	Panama
Scoring by quarter: **17**–10, 13–**24**, **28**–8, **23**–11
Pts: Guerrero 16; Rebs: Araújo 8 Asts: Suero 7		Pts: Romero 13; Rebs: Romero 13; Asts: Hall 7

Multisport Complex 1, Santiago
Referees: Luis Vásquez (PUR), Krishna Domínguez (MEX), Carmelo de la Rosa (PUR)

1 November 2023
10:30

Boxscore

Panama	77–**85**	**Argentina**
Scoring by quarter: 15–**22**, 17–**21**, **28**–25, 17–17
Pts: Sánchez 21; Rebs: Romero 8 Asts: Hall 5		Pts: Cuello 23; Rebs: Ramírez 8 Asts: Baralle, Cuello 5

Multisport Complex 1, Santiago
Referees: Johnny Batista (PUR), Felipe Ibarra (CHI), Fernando Cavalcante (BRA)

2 November 2023
13:00

Boxscore

Panama	68–**77**	**Venezuela**
Scoring by quarter: 12–**16**, **29**–23, 16–**21**, 11–**17**
Pts: Sánchez 23; Rebs: Romero 13; Asts: Hall 4		Pts: Sojo 22; Rebs: Colmenares 18; Asts: Ascanio, Sifontes 3

Multisport Complex 1, Santiago
Referees: Krishna Domínguez (MEX), Carmelo de la Rosa (PUR), Fernando Cavalcante (BRA)

== Boxing ==
Panama qualified five boxers (three men and two women).

Athlete	Event	Round of 32	Round of 16	Quarterfinals	Semifinals	Final	Rank
Athlete	Event	Opposition Result	Opposition Result	Opposition Result	Opposition Result	Opposition Result	Rank
Irvin Ibarguen	Men's –57 kg	—N/a	Allicock (GUY); **L** RSC	Did not advance			
Christopher Simmons	Men's –63.5 kg						
Eduardo Beckford	Men's –71 kg						
Yuliet Hinestroza	Women's –50 kg						
Atheyna Bylon	Women's –75 kg	—N/a	George (TTO); **W** RSC	Maldonado (ECU)			

== Cycling ==
=== Road ===
Panama qualified 1 cyclist at the Pan American Championships.

Athlete	Event	Time	Rank
Bolívar Espinosa	Men's road race		
Bolívar Espinosa	Men's time trial		

== Fencing ==
Panama qualified one female fencer through the 2022 Pan American Fencing Championships in Asunción, Paraguay.

Individual

Athlete	Event	Pool Round		Round of 16	Quarterfinals	Semifinals	Final	
Athlete	Event	Victories	Seed	Opposition Score	Opposition Score	Opposition Score	Opposition Score	Rank
Eileen Grench	Women's sabre							

== Golf ==
Panama qualified a full team of 4 golfers.

Athlete	Event	Round 1	Round 2	Round 3	Round 4	Total		
Athlete	Event	Score	Score	Score	Score	Score	Par	Rank
Jean Paul Ducruet	Men's individual							
Miguel Ordóñez	Men's individual							
Laura Restrepo	Women's individual							
Lúa Pousa	Women's individual							

== Gymnastics ==
=== Artistic ===
Panama qualified six gymnasts in artistic (one man and five women) at the 2023 Pan American Championships.

Men

Athlete	Event	Qualification						Total	Rank
Athlete	Event	F	PH	R	V	PB	HB	Total	Rank
	Individual all-around								

Qualification Legend: Q = Qualified to apparatus final

Women
Team & Individual Qualification

Athlete	Event	Final					
Athlete	Event	Apparatus				Total	Rank
Athlete	Event	V	UB	BB	F	Total	Rank
	Team						
**Total**	Team						

Qualification Legend: Q = Qualified to apparatus final

== Judo ==
Panama has qualified 3 judokas (one man and two women).

Athlete	Event	Round of 16	Quarterfinals	Semifinals	Repechage	Final / BM	
Athlete	Event	Opposition Result	Opposition Result	Opposition Result	Opposition Result	Opposition Result	Rank
	Men's 60 kg						
	Women's 52 kg						
	Women's 57 kg						

== Karate ==
Panama qualified a male karateka at the 2023 Pan American Championships.

Kumite

Athlete	Event	Round robin				Semifinal	Final	
Athlete	Event	Opposition Result	Opposition Result	Opposition Result	Rank	Opposition Result	Opposition Result	Rank
Alberto Gálvez	Men's −67 kg							

== Shooting ==
Panama qualified a total of four shooters in the 2022 Americas Shooting Championships.

Men

Shotgun

Athlete	Event	Qualification		Semifinal		Final / BM	
Athlete	Event	Points	Rank	Points	Rank	Opposition Result	Rank
	Trap						
	Skeet						

== Surfing ==
Panama qualified five surfers (four men and one woman).

Artistic

Athlete	Event	Round 1	Round 2	Round 3	Round 4	Repechage 1	Repechage 2	Repechage 3	Repechage 4	Repechage 5	Final / BM	
Athlete	Event	Opposition Result	Opposition Result	Opposition Result	Opposition Result	Opposition Result	Opposition Result	Opposition Result	Opposition Result	Opposition Result	Opposition Result	Rank
Isauro Elizondo	Men's Shortboard											
Jean Carlos González	Men's Shortboard											
Agustín Cedeño	Men's Longboard											

Race

Athlete	Event	Time	Rank
Edonay Caballero	Men's stand up paddleboard		
Stephanie Bodden	Women's stand up paddleboard		

== Taekwondo ==
Panama qualified one female athlete during the Pan American Games Qualification Tournament.

Kyorugi

Women

Athlete	Event	Round of 16	Quarterfinals	Semifinals	Repechage	Final / BM	
Athlete	Event	Opposition Result	Opposition Result	Opposition Result	Opposition Result	Opposition Result	Rank
	–57 kg						

== Triathlon ==
Panama qualified a male triathlete.

Individual

Athlete	Event	Swimming (1.5 km)	Transition 1	Biking (40 km)	Transition 2	Running (10 km)	Total	Rank
Petter Vega	Men's individual							

== Weightlifting ==
Panama qualified two weightlifters (one man and one woman).

Athlete	Event	Snatch		Clean & Jerk		Total	Rank
Athlete	Event	Result	Rank	Result	Rank	Total	Rank

== Wrestling ==
Panama qualified 3 wrestlers (one man and two women) through the 2022 Pan American Wrestling Championships and the 2023 Pan American Wrestling Championships.

Key:

- VT – Victory by fall.
- PP – Decision by points – the loser with technical points.
- PO – Decision by points – the loser without technical points.
- SP – Technical superiority – the loser with technical points and a margin of victory of at least 9 (Greco-Roman) or 10 (freestyle) points.
- ST – Great superiority – the loser without technical points and a margin of victory of at least 8 (Greco-Roman) or 10 (freestyle) points.
- VA – Decision by withdrawal

Men

Athlete	Event	Quarterfinal	Semifinal	Final / BM	
Athlete	Event	Opposition Result	Opposition Result	Opposition Result	Rank
	Greco-Roman 97 kg				

Women

Athlete	Event	Quarterfinal	Semifinal	Final / BM	
Athlete	Event	Opposition Result	Opposition Result	Opposition Result	Rank
	50 kg				
	53 kg				

== See also ==
- Panama at the 2024 Summer Olympics
