= Panama at the Pan American Games =

- IOC code: PAN
- NOC: Comité Olímpico de Panamá
- Website: www.conpanama.org
- Medals Ranked 21st: Gold 5 Silver 23 Bronze 41 Total 69

Pan American Games appearances (overview)
- 1951; 1955; 1959; 1963; 1967; 1971; 1975; 1979; 1983; 1987; 1991; 1995; 1999; 2003; 2007; 2011; 2015; 2019; 2023

Panama at the Pan American Games.

== Pan American Games ==
=== Medals by games ===
Year	Host city	Gold	Silver	Bronze	Total
1951	Buenos Aires	0	0	2	2
1955	Mexico City	1	1	0	2
1959	Chicago	0	4	4	8
1963	São Paulo	0	1	3	4
1967	Winnipeg	0	1	3	4
1971	Cali	1	1	4	6
1975	Mexico City	0	2	4	6
1979	San Juan	0	2	2	4
1983	Caracas	0	2	4	6
1987	Indianapolis	0	3	1	4
1991	Havana	0	1	0	1
1995	Mar del Plata	0	1	0	1
1999	Winnipeg	0	1	1	2
2003	Santo Domingo	0	0	2	2
2007	Rio de Janeiro	1	1	0	2
2011	Guadalajara	0	0	1	1
2015	Toronto	0	1	1	2
2019	Lima	0	0	4	4
2023	Santiago	2	1	5	8
Total		5	23	41	69

== Junior Pan American Games ==
=== Medals by games ===
Games	Gold	Silver	Bronze	Total	Rank
(Colombia) 2021 Cali-Valle	0	0	5	5	27th
(Paraguay) 2025 Asunción	Future event				
Total	0	0	5	5	27th
