= Fencing at the 2015 Pan American Games – Women's sabre =

Women's sabre at the 2015 Pan American Games
- Venue: Toronto Pan Am Sports Centre
- Dates: July 20
- Competitors: 18 from 10 nations

Medalists
Gold medal	Dagmara Wozniak	United States
Silver medal	Alejandra Benítez	Venezuela
Bronze medal	Gabriella Page	Canada
Bronze medal	María Belén Pérez Maurice	Argentina

The women's sabre competition of the fencing events at the 2015 Pan American Games was held on July 20 at the Toronto Pan Am Sports Centre.

The sabre competition consisted of a qualification round followed by a single-elimination bracket with a bronze medal match between the two semifinal losers. Fencing was done to 15 touches or to the completion of three three-minute rounds if neither fencer reached 15 touches by then. At the end of time, the higher-scoring fencer was the winner; a tie resulted in an additional one-minute sudden-death time period. This sudden-death period was further modified by the selection of a draw-winner beforehand; if neither fencer scored a touch during the minute, the predetermined draw-winner won the bout.

== Schedule ==
All times are Eastern Daylight Time (UTC-4).

Date	Time	Round
July 20, 2015	9:05	Qualification pools
July 20, 2015	10:25	Round of 16
July 20, 2015	11:05	Quarterfinals
July 20, 2015	18:10	Semifinals
July 20, 2015	19:10	Final

== Results ==
The following are the results of the event.

=== Qualification ===
All 18 fencers were put into three groups of six athletes, were each fencer would have five individual matches. The top 16 athletes overall would qualify for next round.

Rank	Name	Nation	Victories	TG	TR	Dif.	Notes
1	Paola Pliego	Mexico	5	25	12	+13	Q
2	Eileen Grench	Panama	4	24	15	+9	Q
3	Rossy Félix	Dominican Republic	4	22	13	+9	Q
4	Mariel Zagunis	United States	4	23	15	+8	Q
5	Dagmara Wozniak	United States	4	23	16	+7	Q
6	María Belén Pérez Maurice	Argentina	3	23	15	+8	Q
7	Yaritza Goulet	Cuba	3	23	19	+4	Q
8	Marissa Ponich	Canada	3	21	20	+1	Q
9	Gabriella Page	Canada	3	20	19	+1	Q
10	Alejandra Benítez	Venezuela	3	19	19	0	Q
11	Julieta Toledo	Mexico	2	16	18	-2	Q
12	Heyydys Ysabel	Dominican Republic	2	16	21	-5	Q
13	Fatima Tobar	El Salvador	1	17	23	-6	Q
14	Jennifer Morales	Cuba	1	16	23	-7	Q
15	Giulia Gasparin	Brazil	1	15	22	-7	Q
15	Alba Marroquin Castañeda	El Salvador	1	15	22	-7	Q
17	Shia Rodriguez	Venezuela	1	12	21	-9	
18	Karina Lakerbai	Brazil	0	8	25	-17	

=== Elimination round ===
Round of 16
1	Paola Pliego (MEX)	15
16	Alba Marroquin Castañeda (ESA)	8
9	Gabriella Page (CAN)	15
8	Marissa Ponich (CAN)	9
5	Dagmara Wozniak (USA)	15
12	Heyydys Ysabel (DOM)	8
13	Fatima Tobar (ESA)	2
4	Mariel Zagunis (USA)	15
3	Rossy Félix (DOM)	15
14	Jennifer Morales (CUB)	10
11	Julieta Toledo (MEX)	11
6	María Belén Pérez Maurice (ARG)	15
7	Yaritza Goulet (CUB)	10
10	Alejandra Benítez (VEN)	15
15	Giulia Gasparin (BRA)	4
2	Eileen Grench (PAN)	15

Quarterfinals
1	Paola Pliego (MEX)	13
9	Gabriella Page (CAN)	15
5	Dagmara Wozniak (USA)	15
4	Mariel Zagunis (USA)	12
3	Rossy Félix (DOM)	6
6	María Belén Pérez Maurice (ARG)	15
10	Alejandra Benítez (VEN)	15
2	Eileen Grench (PAN)	8

Semifinals
9	Gabriella Page (CAN)	13
5	Dagmara Wozniak (USA)	15
6	María Belén Pérez Maurice (ARG)	14
10	Alejandra Benítez (VEN)	15

Final
5	Dagmara Wozniak (USA)	15
10	Alejandra Benítez (VEN)	13
