= Panama at the 2011 Pan American Games =

- IOC code: PAN
- NOC: Comité Olímpico de Panamá
- Website: www.conpanama.org

in Guadalajara 14–30 October 2011
- Competitors: 48 in 13 sports
- Flag bearer: Gabriela Mizrachi
- Medals Ranked 27th: Gold 0 Silver 0 Bronze 1 Total 1

Pan American Games appearances (overview)
- 1951; 1955; 1959; 1963; 1967; 1971; 1975; 1979; 1983; 1987; 1991; 1995; 1999; 2003; 2007; 2011; 2015; 2019; 2023; 2027

Panama competed at the 2011 Pan American Games in Guadalajara, Mexico from October 14 to 30, 2011, but its athletics team, including defending gold medalist Irving Saladino, did not compete because the Panama athletics association has had issues with the Panama Olympic Committee. Panama sent 48 athletes in 13 sports.

== Medalists ==
Medal	Name	Sport	Event	Date
Bronze	Eileen Grench	Fencing	Women's sabre	October 25

== Baseball ==
Panama qualified a baseball team of twenty-three athletes to participate.

Team

- Alberto Acosta
- Abraham Atencio
- Euclides Bethancourt
- Jorge Bishop
- Javier Castillo
- Yeliar Castro
- Angel Chavez
- Gustavo Gomez
- David Gonzalez
- Gustavo Gonzalez
- Saul Gonzalez
- Luis Machuca
- José Macías
- Gilberto Mendez
- Francis Moreno
- Carlos Munoz
- Eliecer Navarro
- Jeffer Patino
- Cesar Quintero
- Carlos Quiroz
- Adolfo Rivera
- Concepción Rodriguez
- Jonathan Vega

Group A

Pos	Team	W	L	RF	RA	RD	PCT	GB	Qualification
1	Mexico (H)	3	0	8	5	+3	1.000	—	Advance to Semifinals
2	United States	2	1	33	5	+28	.667	1	Advance to Semifinals
3	Dominican Republic	1	2	12	29	−17	.333	2	
4	Panama	0	3	7	21	−14	.000	3	

(H) Hosts

October 19, 2011; 19:00	Mexico	2 – 1	Panama	Pan American Baseball Stadium, Lagos de Moreno
October 19, 2011; 19:00		http://200.57.183.69/ENG/BB/BBR173A_BBM40040010100001ENG.htm		Pan American Baseball Stadium, Lagos de Moreno

October 21, 2011; 10:00	United States	11 – 0	Panama	Pan American Baseball Stadium, Lagos de Moreno
October 21, 2011; 10:00		Boxscore		Pan American Baseball Stadium, Lagos de Moreno

October 22, 2011; 14:00	Panama	6 – 8	Dominican Republic	Pan American Baseball Stadium, Lagos de Moreno
October 22, 2011; 14:00		http://200.57.183.69/ENG/BB/BBR173A_BBM40040010100005ENG.htm		Pan American Baseball Stadium, Lagos de Moreno

Seventh place match

October 24, 2011; 10:00	Puerto Rico	3 – 2	Panama	Pan American Baseball Stadium, Lagos de Moreno
October 24, 2011; 10:00		Boxscore		Pan American Baseball Stadium, Lagos de Moreno

== Bowling ==
Panama qualified two male athletes in the bowling competition.

=== Men ===
Individual

Athlete	Event	Qualification															Eighth Finals	Quarterfinals	Semifinals	Finals	
Athlete	Event	Block 1 (Games 1–6)						Block 2 (Games 7–12)						Total	Average	Rank	Eighth Finals	Quarterfinals	Semifinals	Finals	
Athlete	Event	1	2	3	4	5	6	7	8	9	10	11	12	Total	Average	Rank	Opposition Scores	Opposition Scores	Opposition Scores	Opposition Scores	Rank
Diego Alberto Esposito	Men's individual	149	164	174	235	192	195	177	190	216	213	163	150	2218	184.8	28th	did not advance				
Juan Carlos Narvaez	Men's individual	176	237	172	180	156	179	176	198	199	185	182	203	2243	186.9	25th	did not advance				

Pairs

Athlete	Event	Block 1 (Games 1–6)								Block 2 (Games 7–12)								Grand Total	Final Rank
Athlete	Event	1	2	3	4	5	6	Total	Average	7	8	9	10	11	12	Total	Average	Grand Total	Final Rank
Diego Alberto Esposito; Juan Carlos Narvaez	Men's pairs	206	200	138	198	212	218	1166	194.3	211	176	234	237	213	204	2337	194.8	4586	6th
Diego Alberto Esposito; Juan Carlos Narvaez	Men's pairs	243	173	225	169	179	198	1187	197.8	159	157	149	193	276	191	2249	187.4	4586	6th

== Boxing ==
Men

Athlete	Event	Preliminaries	Quarterfinals	Semifinals	Final
Athlete	Event	Opposition Result	Opposition Result	Opposition Result	Opposition Result
Gilberto Pedroza	Light Flyweight		Jantony Ortíz (PUR); L 6 - 17	did not advance	
Cesar Tivas	Light welterweight	Yoelvis Hernandez (VEN); L 10 - 14	did not advance		

== Equestrian ==
Jumping Individual

Athlete	Horse	Event	Ind. Round 1		Ind. Round 2						Final					
Athlete	Horse	Event	Round A		Round A			Round B			Round A		Round B		Total	
Athlete	Horse	Event	Penalties	Rank	Penalties	Total	Rank	Penalties	Total	Rank	Penalties	Rank	Penalties	Rank	Penalties	Rank
Gabriella Mizrachi	Rosalía la Silla	Individual	13.13	48th	5.00	18.13	35th	12.00	30.13	40th	did not advance					

== Fencing ==
Women

Event	Athlete	Round of Poules		Round of 16	Quarterfinals	Semifinals	Final
Event	Athlete	Result	Seed	Opposition Score	Opposition Score	Opposition Score	Opposition Score
Individual sabre	Ana Batista	0 V - 5 D	18th	did not advance			
Individual sabre	Eileen Grench	4 V - 1 D	3rd Q	Maybelline Johnnson (DOM); W 15 - 6	Sandra Sassine (CAN); W 15 - 13	Alejandra Benítez (VEN); L 14 - 15 (bronze)	did not advance
Team sabre	Ana Batista; Eileen Grench; Jacqueline De Roux			Mexico; L 24 - 45	did not advance		

== Karate ==
Panama qualified one athlete in the 61 kg women's category.

Athlete	Event	Round Robin (Pool A/B)			Semifinals	Final
Athlete	Event	Match 1	Match 2	Match 3	Semifinals	Final
Athlete	Event	Opposition Result	Opposition Result	Opposition Result	Opposition Result	Opposition Result
Yaremi Borzelli	Women's -61 kg	Golrokh Khalili (CAN); L PTS 0:5	Daniela Suarez (VEN); L PTS 0:1	Alexandra Grande (PER); HKW 0:0	did not advance	

== Modern pentathlon ==
Panama qualified two male pentathletes.

Men

Athlete	Event	Fencing Victories (pts)	Swimming Time (pts)	Equestrian Score (pts)	Running & Shooting Time (pts)	Total	Rank
Armando Jose Abaunza	Men's	6 (604)	2:18.71 (1136)	175.24 (560)	16:27.40 (1052)	3352	23rd
Jose Guitian	Men's	19 (1072)	DSQ	did not advance			

== Shooting ==
Men

Event	Athlete	Qualification		Final	
Event	Athlete	Score	Rank	Score	Rank
10 m air pistol	Ricardo Tomas Chandeck	558-10x	24th	did not advance	
10 m air pistol	Kevin Javier Vanegas	519- 2x	34th	did not advance	
25 metre rapid fire pistol	Ricardo Tomas Chandeck	528- 5x	12th	did not advance	
25 metre rapid fire pistol	Kevin Javier Vanegas	468- 7x	15th	did not advance	
50 metre pistol	Ricardo Tomas Chandeck	513- 2x	24th	did not advance	
Trap	Eduardo Elias Taylor	99	28th	did not advance	

Women

Event	Athlete	Qualification		Final	
Event	Athlete	Score	Rank	Score	Rank
10 m air pistol	Sandra Araceli Morales	314- 3x	26th	did not advance	

== Swimming ==
Men

Event	Athletes	Heats		Final	
Event	Athletes	Time	Position	Time	Position
100 m Breaststroke	Edgar Roberto Crespo	1:02.29	5th	1:03.08	5th
200 m Breaststroke	Edgar Roberto Crespo	2:20.92	9th QB	2:20.18	1st B
200 m Butterfly	Diego Castillo	2:03.44	11th QB	2:03.32	3rd B
400 m Individual Medley	Diego Castillo	4:45.31	11th QB	4:40.04	1st B

== Taekwondo ==
Panama qualified one athlete in the 58 kg men's category and one athlete in the 49 kg women's category.

Men

Athlete	Event	Round of 16	Quarterfinals	Semifinals	Final
Athlete	Event	Opposition Result	Opposition Result	Opposition Result	Opposition Result
Victor Gonzalez	Flyweight (-58kg)	Mayko Votta (URU); L 9 - 10	did not advance		

Women

Athlete	Event	Round of 16	Quarterfinals	Semifinals	Final	
Athlete	Event	Opposition Result	Opposition Result	Opposition Result	Opposition Result	Rank
Carolena Jean Carstens	Flyweight (-49kg)	Ivett Gonda (CAN); L 4 - 11	did not advance			

== Triathlon ==
Men

Athlete	Event	Swim (1.5 km)	Trans 1	Bike (40 km)	Trans 2	Run (10 km)	Total	Rank
Billy Gordon	Individual	19:32; 32nd	0:27; 28th	LAP				

== Weightlifting ==
Athlete	Event	Snatch			Clean & Jerk			Total	Rank
Athlete	Event	Attempt 1	Attempt 2	Attempt 3	Attempt 1	Attempt 2	Attempt 3	Total	Rank
Victor Viquez	Men's 77 kg	~~130~~	130	~~135~~	~~168~~	168	~~175~~	298	5th

== Wrestling ==
Panama qualified one athlete in the 84 kg men's freestyle category, one athlete in the 74 kg men's Greco-Roman category, and one athlete in the 72 kg women's category.

Men

Freestyle

Athlete	Event	Round of 16	Quarterfinals	Semifinals	Final
Athlete	Event	Opposition Result	Opposition Result	Opposition Result	Opposition Result
Roberto Carlos Espinosa	84 kg		Adrian Antoine Jaoude (BRA); L VT 0 - 5	did not advance	

Greco-Roman

Athlete	Event	Round of 16	Quarterfinals	Semifinals	Final
Athlete	Event	Opposition Result	Opposition Result	Opposition Result	Opposition Result
Elton Brown	74 kg		Benjamin Errol Provisor (USA); L PO 0 - 3		Bronze medal match: Hansel Mercedes Martinez (DOM); L PO 0 - 3

Women

Freestyle

Athlete	Event	Quarterfinals	Semifinals	Final
Athlete	Event	Opposition Result	Opposition Result	Opposition Result
Ashley Zarate	72 kg	Aline Ferreira (BRA); L VT 0 - 5		Bronze medal match: Elsa Sanchez Sanchez (DOM); L PP 1 - 3
