= Gabriella Page =

Canadian fencer (born 1994)

Personal information
- Full name: Gabriella Charlotte Page
- Born: October 29, 1994 (age 31) Montreal, Quebec, Canada

Fencing career
- Sport: Fencing
- Country: Canada
- Weapon: Foil; Sabre
- Hand: Right-handed
Medal record
Women's fencing
Representing Canada
Pan American Games
Silver medal – second place	2019 Lima	Team foil
Bronze medal – third place	2015 Toronto	Individual sabre
Bronze medal – third place	2019 Lima	Individual sabre
Bronze medal – third place	2019 Lima	Team sabre
Pan American Fencing Championships
Silver medal – second place	2022 Asunción	Individual sabre
Silver medal – second place	2022 Asunción	Team sabre
Bronze medal – third place	2013 Cartagena	Team sabre
Bronze medal – third place	2014 San José	Team sabre
Bronze medal – third place	2016 Panama City	Team sabre
Bronze medal – third place	2019 Toronto	Individual sabre

Gabriella Charlotte Page (born October 29, 1994) is a Canadian fencer.

== Biography ==
In 2015, she won one of the bronze medals in the women's sabre event at the Pan American Games held in Toronto, Canada. She also won a bronze medal in the same event at the 2019 Pan American Games held in Lima, Peru.

She also competed at the Pan American Fencing Championships where she won a bronze medal in the individual sabre event in 2019; bronze medals in the team sabre event in 2012, 2013 and 2016; and competed in 2014, 2015 and 2018.

Page represented Canada at the 2020 Summer Olympics in Tokyo, Japan. She competed in the women's sabre event.

She won the silver medal in both the women's individual and team sabre events at the 2022 Pan American Fencing Championships held in Asunción, Paraguay.
