= Nimia Murua =

Panamanian swimmer (born 1997)

Nimia Murúa
Personal information
- Full name: Nimia Melissa Murúa Paz
- Nationality: Panamanian
- Born: 4 December 1997 (age 28)

Sport
- Sport: Swimming

Nimia Melissa Murúa Paz (Note: In this Spanish name, the first or paternal surname is Murúa and the second or maternal family name is Paz.) (born 4 December 1997) is a Panamanian swimmer. She competed in the women's 50 metre backstroke event at the 2018 FINA World Swimming Championships (25 m), in Hangzhou, China.
