= David Muñoz (sport shooter) =

Panamanian sports shooter

Personal information
- Born: 29 September 1964 (age 61)

Sport
- Sport: Sports shooting

David Muñoz (born 29 September 1964) is a Panamanian sports shooter. He competed in the men's 10 metre air pistol event at the 2016 Summer Olympics.
