= Brazil at the Olympics =

- Flag of Brazil
- IOC code: BRA
- NOC: Brazilian Olympic Committee
- Website: www.cob.org.br (in Portuguese)
- Medals Ranked 32nd: Gold 41 Silver 49 Bronze 81 Total 171

Summer appearances
- 1920; 1924; 1928; 1932; 1936; 1948; 1952; 1956; 1960; 1964; 1968; 1972; 1976; 1980; 1984; 1988; 1992; 1996; 2000; 2004; 2008; 2012; 2016; 2020; 2024; 2028

Winter appearances
- 1992; 1994; 1998; 2002; 2006; 2010; 2014; 2018; 2022; 2026

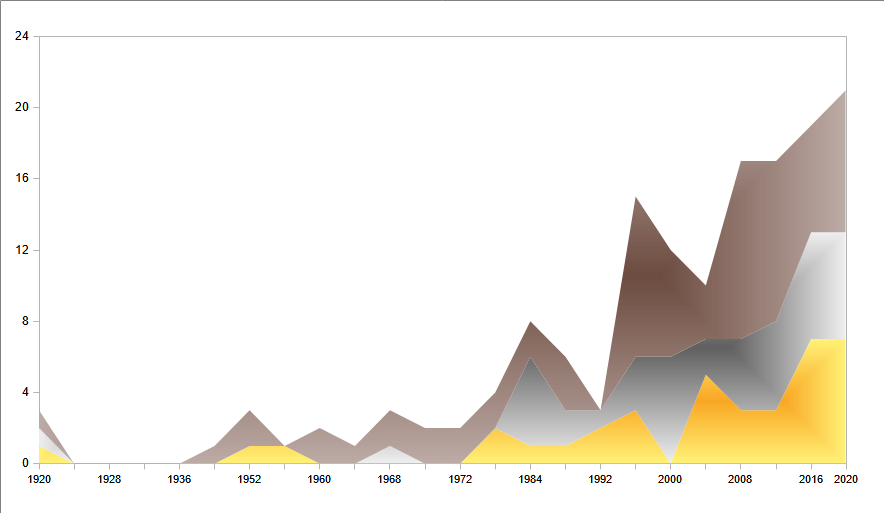
Medals won by Brazil between 1920 and 2020.

Brazil first participated at the Olympic Games in 1920, after missing the previous five Summer editions. The country has sent athletes to compete in every Summer Olympic Games since then, except for the 1928 Games. As of 2026, Brazilian athletes have won a total of 171 Olympic medals, among them 170 medals in 18 different Summer sports and 1 in a Winter sport.

In its inaugural participation at the 1920 Summer Olympics in Antwerp, Brazil won its first Olympic medal, a silver with Afrânio da Costa in men's 50 metre free pistol in Shooting. In the same edition and sport, the first gold medal was also conquered by Guilherme Paraense in men's 30 metre military pistol. The first Olympic medal and the first women's gold medal in Brazilian history were simultaneously earned 76 years later, at the 1996 Summer Olympics in Atlanta, in the all-Brazilian final between Sandra Pires and Jackie Silva (who won gold) and Mônica Rodrigues and Adriana Samuel in women's beach volleyball.

Brazil has also participated in the Winter Olympic Games since 1992. At the 2026 Winter Olympics, alpine skier Lucas Pinheiro Braathen won Brazil's single medal at the Winter Olympic Games, becoming the first Latin American, South American and Brazilian as well as the first athlete representing any tropical nation to win a medal in the Winter Olympics with a gold in the men's giant slalom.

Volleyball (indoors and beach volley), sailing and judo are Brazil's top medal-producing sports in the Summer editions. The country is also the most decorated in football, with the men's team having seven medals (2 gold, 3 silver and 2 bronze) and the women's team adding three silver medals for a total of ten.

Rio de Janeiro in Brazil was the host city to the 2016 Summer Olympics. This marked the first time that any country in South America has hosted the games. This also marks the first time that a lusophone country hosted any edition of the Olympic Games. Rio was only the second city in Latin America to host the Summer Olympics, after Mexico City in 1968, and Brazil was only the second country of the Southern Hemisphere to host the Olympics, after Australia in 1956 and 2000.

As the hosts of the 2016 Summer Olympics, Brazil had the second most successful participation at the Summer Olympics to date, earning seven gold medals and nineteen medals overall. The nation's most successful overall performance at the Olympics occurred at the 2020 Summer Olympics. Tied with 2016 games in number of gold medals (7) and silver medals (6) but with 2 more bronze medals (8), Brazil became the second nation to surpass its medal total at the Olympics immediately following one that it hosted (the other one was Great Britain in the 2016 Olympics). The country broke the record for medals in one edition (21) and was also in the highest position on medal table on games history (12th place).

One athlete from Brazil has been awarded the Pierre de Coubertin medal: Vanderlei de Lima, a long-distance runner who was attacked by a protester during the men's marathon at the 2004 edition in Athens, Greece, when he was leading the race. Lima lost two places, winning the bronze medal. In spite of the situation, he still celebrated the third-place, showing good sportsmanship.

The National Olympic Committee for Brazil is the Brazilian Olympic Committee. The entity was created in 1914 and recognized in 1935.

== Hosted Games ==
Brazil has hosted the Games on one occasion.

Games	Host city	Dates	Nations	Participants	Events
2016 Summer Olympics	Rio de Janeiro, Rio de Janeiro	5 – 21 August	207	11,303	306

=== Unsuccessful Bids ===
Games	City	Winner of bid
1936 Summer Olympics	Rio de Janeiro	Berlin, Germany
2000 Summer Olympics	Brasília (Note: Withdrawn after the IOC first inspection.)	Sydney, Australia
2004 Summer Olympics	Rio de Janeiro	Athens, Greece
2012 Summer Olympics	Rio de Janeiro	London, United Kingdom

== Medal tables ==
=== Medals by Summer Games ===
Host country

Games	Athletes	Gold	Silver	Bronze	Total	Rank
(Belgium) 1920 Antwerp	21	1	1	1	3	15
(French Third Republic) 1924 Paris	12	0	0	0	0	–
(Netherlands) 1928 Amsterdam	did not participate					
(United States) 1932 Los Angeles	67	0	0	0	0	–
(Nazi Germany) 1936 Berlin	73	0	0	0	0	–
(United Kingdom) 1948 London	70	0	0	1	1	34
(Finland) 1952 Helsinki	108	1	0	2	3	24
(Australia) 1956 Melbourne	44	1	0	0	1	24
(Italy) 1960 Rome	72	0	0	2	2	39
(Japan) 1964 Tokyo	61	0	0	1	1	35
1968 Mexico City	76	0	1	2	3	35
(West Germany) 1972 Munich	81	0	0	2	2	41
(Canada) 1976 Montreal	81	0	0	2	2	36
(Soviet Union) 1980 Moscow	109	2	0	2	4	17
(United States) 1984 Los Angeles	151	1	5	2	8	19
(South Korea) 1988 Seoul	171	1	2	3	6	24
(Spain) 1992 Barcelona	195	2	1	0	3	25
(United States) 1996 Atlanta	225	3	3	9	15	25
(Australia) 2000 Sydney	205	0	6	6	12	53
(Greece) 2004 Athens	247	5	2	3	10	16
(China) 2008 Beijing	277	3	4	10	17	23
(United Kingdom) 2012 London	259	3	5	9	17	22
(Brazil) 2016 Rio de Janeiro	465	7	6	6	19	13
(Japan) 2020 Tokyo	301	7	6	8	21	12
(France) 2024 Paris	277	3	7	10	20	20
(United States) 2028 Los Angeles	future event					
(Australia) 2032 Brisbane	future event					
Total (24/30)	3,648	40	49	81	170	32

=== Medals by Winter Games ===
Games	Athletes	Gold	Silver	Bronze	Total	Rank
(France) 1992 Albertville	7	0	0	0	0	–
(Norway) 1994 Lillehammer	1	0	0	0	0	–
(Japan) 1998 Nagano	1	0	0	0	0	–
(United States) 2002 Salt Lake City	10	0	0	0	0	–
(Italy) 2006 Turin	9	0	0	0	0	–
(Canada) 2010 Vancouver	5	0	0	0	0	–
(Russia) 2014 Sochi	13	0	0	0	0	–
(South Korea) 2018 Pyeongchang	9	0	0	0	0	–
(China) 2022 Beijing	10	0	0	0	0	–
(Italy) 2026 Milano Cortina	14	1	0	0	1	19
(France) 2030 French Alps	future event					
(United States) 2034 Utah	future event					
Total (10/25)	79	1	0	0	1	42

=== Medals by summer sport ===
Sports	Gold	Silver	Bronze	Total	Rank
Sailing	8	3	8	19	11
Judo	5	4	19	28	8
Athletics	5	4	12	21	34
Volleyball	5	4	3	12	2
Beach volleyball	4	7	3	14	2
Artistic gymnastics	3	5	2	10	20
Football	2	6	2	10	4
Swimming	2	4	11	17	24
Boxing	2	2	5	9	28
Canoeing	1	3	1	5	30
Shooting	1	2	1	4	38
Surfing	1	1	1	3	2
Equestrian	1	0	2	3	20
Skateboarding	0	3	2	5	3
Basketball	0	1	4	5	10
Taekwondo	0	0	3	3	36
Modern pentathlon	0	0	1	1	25
Tennis	0	0	1	1	33
Total (18)	40	49	81	170	32

=== Medals by winter sport ===
Sports	Gold	Silver	Bronze	Total	Rank
Alpine skiing	1	0	0	1	17
Total (1)	1	0	0	1	42

=== Medals by Gender in Summer Games ===
Gender	Gold	Silver	Bronze	Total
Men	26	34	57	117
Women	13	15	21	49
Mixed / Open (Note: Medals won in Equestrian are considered an open event because men and women compete together.)	1	0	3	4
Total	40	49	81	170

=== Medals by Gender in Winter Games ===
Gender	Gold	Silver	Bronze	Total
Men	1	0	0	1
Women	0	0	0	0
Mixed / Open	0	0	0	0
Total	1	0	0	1

== Best results in non-medaling sports ==
Summer Games
Sport	Rank	Athlete	Event & Year
3x3 basketball	Never participated		
Archery	R16	Marcus D'Almeida	Men's individual in 2020 and 2024
Archery	R16	Ane Marcelle dos Santos	Women's individual in 2016
Archery	R16	Ana Luiza Caetano	Women's individual in 2024
Artistic swimming	6th	Brazil women's team	Women's team in 2016
Badminton	R1	Ygor Coelho	Men's singles in 2020
Badminton	R1	Juliana Vieira	Women's singles in 2024
Baseball	Never participated		
BMX	6th	Gustavo Oliveira	Men's BMX freestyle in 2024
Canoe slalom	4th	Ana Sátila	Women's slalom in 2024
Diving	6th	Milton Busin	Men's 3 metre springboard in 1952
Fencing	6th	Nathalie Moellhausen	Women's épée in 2016
Field hockey	12th	Brazil men's team	Men's tournament in 2016
Golf	39th	Adilson da Silva	Men's individual in 2016
Handball	5th	Brazil women's team	Women's tournament in 2016
Rhythmic gymnastics	8th	Camila Ferezin; Natália Scherer; Flávia de Faria; Alessandra Ferezin; Thalita Nakadomari	Women's group in 2000
Rhythmic gymnastics	8th	Larissa Barata; Dayane Camilo; Fernanda Cavalieri; Ana Maria Maciel; Tayanne Mantovaneli	Women's group in 2004
Mountain biking	13th	Henrique Avancini	Men's cross-country in 2020
Road cycling	7th	Flávia Oliveira	Women's road in 2016
Rowing	4th	Carlos Branco; Edmundo Branco	Men's double sculls in 1924
Rowing	4th	Francisco de Bricio; José Ramalho	Men's coxed pair in 1932
Rowing	4th	Ángelo Roso Neto; Walter Soares	Men's coxed pair in 1984
Rugby sevens	9th	Brazil women's team	Women's tournament in 2016
Softball	Never participated		
Sport climbing	Never participated		
Table tennis	4th	Hugo Calderano	Men's singles in 2024
Track cycling	5th	Anésio Argenton	Men's sprint in 1960
Trampoline gymnastics	12th	Rayan Dutra	Men's individual in 2024
Triathlon	8th	Miguel Hidalgo; Djenyfer Arnold; Manoel Messias; Vittória Lopes	Mixed relay in 2024
Water polo	6th	Brazil men's team	Men's tournament in 1920
Weightlifting	5th	Fernando Reis	Men's super heavyweight in 2016
Weightlifting	5th	Rosane Santos	Women's featherweight in 2016
Wrestling	5th	Giullia Penalber	Women's freestyle in 2024
Winter
Sport	Rank	Athlete	Event & Year
Biathlon	76th	Jaqueline Mourão	Women's individual in 2014
Bobsleigh	19th	Fabiana Santos; Sally da Silva	Two-woman in 2014
Bobsleigh	19th	Edson Bindilatti; Luis Bacca Gonçalves; Davidson Henrique de Souza; Rafael Souza da Silva	Four-man in 2026
Cross-country skiing	21st	Bruna Moura; Eduarda Ribera	Women's team sprint in 2026
Curling	Never participated		
Figure skating	24th	Isadora Williams	Ladies' singles in 2018
Freestyle skiing	21st	Joselane Santos	Women's aerials in 2014
Ice hockey	Never participated		
Luge	45th	Ricardo Raschini	Men's singles in 2002
Nordic combined	Never participated		
Short track speed skating	Never participated		
Skeleton	11th	Nicole Silveira	Women's in 2026
Ski jumping	Never participated		
Ski mountaineering	Never participated		
Snowboarding	9th	Isabel Clark Ribeiro	Women's snowboard cross in 2006
Speed skating	Never participated		

== Flagbearers ==
Summer Olympics
Games	Athlete	Sport
(Kingdom of Greece) 1896 Athens	did not participate	
(France) 1900 Paris	did not participate	
(United States) 1904 St. Louis	did not participate	
(United Kingdom) 1908 London	did not participate	
(Sweden) 1912 Stockholm	did not participate	
(Belgium) 1920 Antwerp	Afrânio da Costa	Shooting
(France) 1924 Paris	Alfredo Gomes	Athletics
(Netherlands) 1928 Amsterdam	did not participate	
(United States) 1932 Los Angeles	Lúcio de Castro	Athletics
(Nazi Germany) 1936 Berlin	Antônio Lira	Athletics
(United Kingdom) 1948 London	Sylvio de Magalhães Padilha	Athletics
(Finland) 1952 Helsinki	Mário Jorge da Fonseca Hermes	Basketball
(Australia) 1956 Melbourne	Adhemar Ferreira da Silva	Athletics
(Italy) 1960 Rome	Adhemar Ferreira da Silva	Athletics
(Japan) 1964 Tokyo	Wlamir Marques	Basketball
1968 Mexico City	João Gonçalves Filho	Water polo
(West Germany) 1972 Munich	Luiz Cláudio Menon	Basketball
(Canada) 1976 Montreal	João Carlos de Oliveira	Athletics
(Soviet Union) 1980 Moscow	João Carlos de Oliveira	Athletics
(United States) 1984 Los Angeles	Eduardo de Souza	Sailing
(South Korea) 1988 Seoul	Walter Carmona	Judo
(Spain) 1992 Barcelona	Aurélio Miguel	Judo
(United States) 1996 Atlanta	Joaquim Cruz	Athletics
(Australia) 2000 Sydney	Sandra Pires	Beach volleyball
(Greece) 2004 Athens	Torben Grael	Sailing
(China) 2008 Beijing	Robert Scheidt	Sailing
(United Kingdom) 2012 London	Rodrigo Pessoa	Equestrian
(Brazil) 2016 Rio de Janeiro	Yane Marques	Modern pentathlon
(Japan) 2020 Tokyo	Ketleyn Quadros	Judo
(Japan) 2020 Tokyo	Bruno Rezende	Volleyball
(France) 2024 Paris	Raquel Kochhann	Rugby sevens
(France) 2024 Paris	Isaquias Queiroz	Canoeing

Winter Olympics
Games	Athlete	Sport
(France) 1924 Chamonix	did not participate	
(Switzerland) 1928 St. Moritz	did not participate	
(United States) 1932 Lake Placid	did not participate	
(Nazi Germany) 1936 Garmisch-Partenkirchen	did not participate	
(Switzerland) 1948 St. Moritz	did not participate	
(Norway) 1952 Oslo	did not participate	
(Italy) 1956 Cortina d'Ampezzo	did not participate	
(United States) 1960 Squaw Valley	did not participate	
(Austria) 1964 Innsbruck	did not participate	
(France) 1968 Grenoble	did not participate	
(Japan) 1972 Sapporo	did not participate	
(Austria) 1976 Innsbruck	did not participate	
(United States) 1980 Lake Placid	did not participate	
(Socialist Federal Republic of Yugoslavia) 1984 Sarajevo	did not participate	
(Canada) 1988 Calgary	did not participate	
(France) 1992 Albertville	Hans Egger	Alpine skiing
(Norway) 1994 Lillehammer	Lothar Christian Munder	Alpine skiing
(Japan) 1998 Nagano	Marcelo Apovian	Alpine skiing
(United States) 2002 Salt Lake City	Mirella Arnhold	Alpine skiing
(Italy) 2006 Turin	Isabel Clark Ribeiro	Snowboarding
(Canada) 2010 Vancouver	Isabel Clark Ribeiro	Snowboarding
(Russia) 2014 Sochi	Jaqueline Mourão	Biathlon & Cross-country skiing
(South Korea) 2018 Pyeongchang	Edson Bindilatti	Bobsleigh
(China) 2022 Beijing	Jaqueline Mourão	Cross-country skiing
(China) 2022 Beijing	Edson Bindilatti	Bobsleigh
(Italy) 2026 Milano Cortina	Nicole Silveira	Skeleton
(Italy) 2026 Milano Cortina	Lucas Pinheiro Braathen	Alpine skiing

== Olympic medalists ==
=== Summer Games ===
Medal	Name(s)	Games	Sport	Event	Date
Gold	Guilherme Paraense	(Belgium) 1920 Antwerp	Shooting	Men's 30 m military pistol	3 August 1920
Silver	Afrânio da Costa	(Belgium) 1920 Antwerp	Shooting	Men's 50 metre free pistol	2 August 1920
Bronze	Afrânio da Costa; Guilherme Paraense; Sebastião Wolf; Fernando Soledade; Dario Barbosa	(Belgium) 1920 Antwerp	Shooting	Men's 50 metre team free pistol	2 August 1920
Bronze	Men's basketball team: Alberto Marson Alexandre Gemignani Alfredo da Motta Affonso Évora João Francisco Bráz Luís Benvenuti Marcus Vinícius Dias Massinet Sorcinelli Nilton Pacheco Ruy de Freitas Zenny de Azevedo	(United Kingdom) 1948 London	Basketball	Men's tournament	13 August 1948
Gold	Adhemar da Silva	(Finland) 1952 Helsinki	Athletics	Men's triple jump	23 July 1952
Bronze	José da Conceição	(Finland) 1952 Helsinki	Athletics	Men's high jump	20 July 1952
Bronze	Tetsuo Okamoto	(Finland) 1952 Helsinki	Swimming	Men's 1500 metre freestyle	2 August 1952
Gold	Adhemar da Silva	(Australia) 1956 Melbourne	Athletics	Men's triple jump	27 November 1956
Bronze	Manoel dos Santos	(Italy) 1960 Rome	Swimming	Men's 100 metre freestyle	27 August 1960
Bronze	Men's basketball team: Edson Bispo dos Santos Moysés Blás Waldemar Blatskauskas Zenny de Azevedo Carmo de Souza Carlos Domingos Massoni Waldyr Boccardo Wlamir Marques Amaury Pasos Fernando Pereira de Freitas Antônio Salvador Sucar Jatyr Eduardo Schall	(Italy) 1960 Rome	Basketball	Men's tournament	10 September 1960
Bronze	Men's basketball team: Ubiratan Pereira Maciel Friedrich Wilhelm Braun Jatyr Eduardo Schall Victor Mirshawka Edson Bispo dos Santos Wlamir Marques Amaury Pasos Carlos Domingos Massoni Carmo de Souza Antônio Salvador Sucar Sergio de Toledo Machado José Edvar Simões	(Japan) 1964 Tokyo	Basketball	Men's tournament	23 October 1964
Silver	Nelson Prudêncio	1968 Mexico City	Athletics	Men's triple jump	17 October 1968
Bronze	Reinaldo Conrad; Burkhard Cordes	1968 Mexico City	Sailing	Men's Flying Dutchman	21 October 1968
Bronze	Servílio de Oliveira	1968 Mexico City	Boxing	Men's Flyweight	24 October 1968
Bronze	Chiaki Ishii	(West Germany) 1972 Munich	Judo	Men's 93 kg	1 September 1972
Bronze	Nelson Prudêncio	(West Germany) 1972 Munich	Athletics	Men's triple jump	4 September 1972
Bronze	Reinaldo Conrad; Peter Ficker	(Canada) 1976 Montreal	Sailing	Men's Flying Dutchman	27 July 1976
Bronze	João Carlos de Oliveira	(Canada) 1976 Montreal	Athletics	Men's triple jump	30 July 1976
Gold	Alexandre Welter; Lars Sigurd Björkström	(Soviet Union) 1980 Moscow	Sailing	Men's Tornado	29 July 1980
Gold	Marcos Soares; Eduardo Penido	(Soviet Union) 1980 Moscow	Sailing	Men's 470 class	29 July 1980
Bronze	Jorge Fernandes; Marcus Mattioli; Cyro Delgado; Djan Madruga	(Soviet Union) 1980 Moscow	Swimming	Men's 4 × 200 metre freestyle relay	23 July 1980
Bronze	João Carlos de Oliveira	(Soviet Union) 1980 Moscow	Athletics	Men's triple jump	24 July 1980
Gold	Joaquim Cruz	(United States) 1984 Los Angeles	Athletics	Men's 800 m	6 August 1984
Silver	Ricardo Prado	(United States) 1984 Los Angeles	Swimming	Men's 400 metre individual medley	30 July 1984
Silver	Torben Grael; Daniel Adler; Ronaldo Senfft	(United States) 1984 Los Angeles	Sailing	Men's Soling	8 August 1984
Silver	Douglas Vieira	(United States) 1984 Los Angeles	Judo	Men's 95 kg	9 August 1984
Silver	Men's Brazil Olympic football team: Pinga Davi Milton Cruz Luís Henrique Dias André Luís Mauro Galvão Tonho Kita Gilmar Popoca Silvinho Gilmar Ademir Paulo Santos Ronaldo Silva Dunga Chicão Luiz Carlos Winck	(United States) 1984 Los Angeles	Football	Men's tournament	11 August 1984
Silver	Men's national volleyball team: Amauri Ribeiro Antônio Carlos Gueiros Ribeiro Bernard Rajzman Bernardo Rocha de Rezende Domingos Lampariello Neto Fernando Roscio de Ávila Marcus Vinícius Simões Freire José Montanaro Junior Renan Dal Zotto Rui Campos do Nascimento William Carvalho da Silva Mário Xandó de Oliveira Neto	(United States) 1984 Los Angeles	Volleyball	Men's tournament	11 August 1984
Bronze	Luís Onmura	(United States) 1984 Los Angeles	Judo	Men's 71 kg	6 August 1984
Bronze	Walter Carmona	(United States) 1984 Los Angeles	Judo	Men's 86 kg	8 August 1984
Gold	Aurélio Miguel	(South Korea) 1988 Seoul	Judo	Men's 95 kg	30 September 1988
Silver	Joaquim Cruz	(South Korea) 1988 Seoul	Athletics	Men's 800 m	26 September 1988
Silver	Men's Brazil Olympic football team: Ademir Aloísio Andrade Batista Bebeto Careca André Cruz Edmar Geovani João Paulo Jorginho Milton Neto Romário Cláudio Taffarel Luiz Carlos Winck Ricardo Gomes Mazinho Valdo Filho Zé Carlos	(South Korea) 1988 Seoul	Football	Men's tournament	1 October 1988
Bronze	Torben Grael; Nelson Falcão	(South Korea) 1988 Seoul	Sailing	Men's Star	27 September 1988
Bronze	Lars Grael; Clinio Freitas	(South Korea) 1988 Seoul	Sailing	Men's Tornado	27 September 1988
Bronze	Robson Caetano	(South Korea) 1988 Seoul	Athletics	Men's 200 m	28 September 1988
Gold	Rogério Sampaio	(Spain) 1992 Barcelona	Judo	Men's 65 kg	1 August 1992
Gold	Men's national volleyball team: Marcelo Negrão Jorge Brito Giovane Gávio Paulo Silva Maurício Lima Janelson Carvalho Douglas Chiarotti Antônio Gouveia Amauri Ribeiro André Ferreira Alexandre Samuel Talmo Oliveira	(Spain) 1992 Barcelona	Volleyball	Men's tournament	9 August 1992
Silver	Gustavo Borges	(Spain) 1992 Barcelona	Swimming	Men's 100 metre freestyle	28 July 1992
Gold	Jaqueline Silva; Sandra Pires	(United States) 1996 Atlanta	Beach volleyball	Women's tournament	27 July 1996
Gold	Torben Grael; Marcelo Ferreira	(United States) 1996 Atlanta	Sailing	Men's Star	29 July 1996
Gold	Robert Scheidt	(United States) 1996 Atlanta	Sailing	Men's Laser	31 July 1996
Silver	Gustavo Borges	(United States) 1996 Atlanta	Swimming	Men's 200 metre freestyle	20 July 1996
Silver	Adriana Samuel; Mônica Rodrigues	(United States) 1996 Atlanta	Beach volleyball	Women's tournament	27 July 1996
Silver	Women's basketball team: Hortência Marcari Oliva Maria Angélica Adriana Aparecida Santos Leila Sobral Maria Paula Silva Janeth Arcain Roseli Gustavo Marta Sobral Silvinha Alessandra Santos de Oliveira Cintia Santos Claudia Maria Pastor	(United States) 1996 Atlanta	Basketball	Women's tournament	4 August 1996
Bronze	Aurélio Miguel	(United States) 1996 Atlanta	Judo	Men's 95 kg	21 July 1996
Bronze	Gustavo Borges	(United States) 1996 Atlanta	Swimming	Men's 100 metre freestyle	22 July 1996
Bronze	Henrique Guimarães	(United States) 1996 Atlanta	Judo	Men's 65 kg	25 July 1996
Bronze	Fernando Scherer	(United States) 1996 Atlanta	Swimming	Men's 50 metre freestyle	25 July 1996
Bronze	Lars Grael; Kiko Pellicano	(United States) 1996 Atlanta	Sailing	Men's Tornado	30 July 1996
Bronze	Rodrigo Pessoa; Luiz Felipe de Azevedo; Álvaro de Miranda Neto; André Johannpeter	(United States) 1996 Atlanta	Equestrian	Team jumping	1 August 1996
Bronze	Men's under-23 football team: Dida Zé María Aldair Ronaldo Guiaro Flávio Conceição Roberto Carlos Bebeto Amaral Ronaldo Rivaldo Sávio Danrlei Narciso André Luiz Zé Elias Marcelinho Luizão Juninho	(United States) 1996 Atlanta	Football	Men's tournament	2 August 1996
Bronze	Women's national volleyball team: Ida Alvares Leila Barros Ericleia Bodziak Hilma Caldeira Ana Paula Connelly Márcia Cunha Virna Dias Ana Moser Ana Flávia Sanglard Hélia Souza Sandra Suruagy Fernanda Venturini	(United States) 1996 Atlanta	Volleyball	Women's tournament	3 August 1996
Bronze	André Domingos; Arnaldo da Silva; Édson Luciano; Robson Caetano	(United States) 1996 Atlanta	Athletics	Men's 4 × 100 metres relay	3 August 1996
Silver	Tiago Camilo	(Australia) 2000 Sydney	Judo	Men's 73 kg	18 September 2000
Silver	Carlos Honorato	(Australia) 2000 Sydney	Judo	Men's 90 kg	20 September 2000
Silver	Adriana Behar; Shelda Bede	(Australia) 2000 Sydney	Beach volleyball	Women's tournament	25 September 2000
Silver	Ricardo Santos; Zé Marco de Melo	(Australia) 2000 Sydney	Beach volleyball	Men's tournament	26 September 2000
Silver	Robert Scheidt	(Australia) 2000 Sydney	Sailing	Men's Laser	29 September 2000
Silver	André Domingos; Claudinei Quirino; Édson Luciano; Vicente Lenílson; Cláudio Roberto Sousa	(Australia) 2000 Sydney	Athletics	Men's 4 × 100 metres relay	30 September 2000
Bronze	Gustavo Borges; Fernando Scherer; Carlos Jayme; Edvaldo Valério	(Australia) 2000 Sydney	Swimming	Men's 4 × 100 metre freestyle relay	16 September 2000
Bronze	Adriana Samuel; Sandra Pires	(Australia) 2000 Sydney	Beach volleyball	Women's tournament	25 September 2000
Bronze	Rodrigo Pessoa; Luiz Felipe de Azevedo; Álvaro de Miranda Neto; André Johannpeter	(Australia) 2000 Sydney	Equestrian	Team jumping	28 September 2000
Bronze	Torben Grael; Marcelo Ferreira	(Australia) 2000 Sydney	Sailing	Men's Star	30 September 2000
Bronze	Women's national volleyball team: Leila Barros Erika Coimbra Janina Conceição Virna Dias Kely Fraga Ricarda Lima Kátia Lopes Elisângela Oliveira Walewska Oliveira Karin Rodrigues Raquel Silva Hélia Souza	(Australia) 2000 Sydney	Volleyball	Women's tournament	30 September 2000
Bronze	Women's basketball team: Janeth Arcain Ilisaine David Lilian Gonçalves Helen Luz Silvia Luz Claudia Neves Alessandra Oliveira Adriana Pinto Adriana Santos Cintia Santos Kelly Santos Marta Sobral	(Australia) 2000 Sydney	Basketball	Women's tournament	30 September 2000
Gold	Robert Scheidt	(Greece) 2004 Athens	Sailing	Men's Laser	22 August 2004
Gold	Ricardo Santos; Emanuel Rego	(Greece) 2004 Athens	Beach volleyball	Men's tournament	25 August 2004
Gold	Rodrigo Pessoa	(Greece) 2004 Athens	Equestrian	Individual jumping	29 August 2005
Gold	Torben Grael; Marcelo Ferreira	(Greece) 2004 Athens	Sailing	Men's Star	28 August 2004
Gold	Men's national volleyball team: Giovane Gávio André Heller Maurício Lima Gilberto Godoy Filho André Nascimento Sérgio Santos Anderson Rodrigues Nalbert Bitencourt Gustavo Endres Rodrigo Santana Ricardo Garcia Dante Amaral	(Greece) 2004 Athens	Volleyball	Men's tournament	29 August 2004
Silver	Adriana Behar; Shelda Bede	(Greece) 2004 Athens	Beach volleyball	Women's tournament	24 August 2004
Silver	Women's national football team: Andréia Maravilha Mônica Tânia Juliana Daniela Rosana Renata Costa Aline Formiga Elaine Maycon Pretinha Marta Cristiane Roseli Dayane Grazielle	(Greece) 2004 Athens	Football	Women's tournament	26 August 2004
Bronze	Leandro Guilheiro	(Greece) 2004 Athens	Judo	Men's 73 kg	16 August 2004
Bronze	Flávio Canto	(Greece) 2004 Athens	Judo	Men's 81 kg	17 August 2004
Bronze	Vanderlei de Lima	(Greece) 2004 Athens	Athletics	Men's marathon	29 August 2004
Gold	César Cielo	(China) 2008 Beijing	Swimming	Men's 50 metre freestyle	16 August 2008
Gold	Maurren Maggi	(China) 2008 Beijing	Athletics	Women's long jump	22 August 2008
Gold	Women's national volleyball team: Walewska Oliveira Carolina Albuquerque Marianne Steinbrecher Paula Pequeno Thaísa Daher Hélia Souza Valeska Menezes Fabiana Claudino Welissa Gonzaga Jaqueline Carvalho Sheilla Castro Fabiana de Oliveira	(China) 2008 Beijing	Volleyball	Women's tournament	23 August 2008
Silver	Robert Scheidt; Bruno Prada	(China) 2008 Beijing	Sailing	Men's Star	21 August 2008
Silver	Women's national football team: Andréia Simone Andréia Rosa Tânia Renata Costa Maycon Daniela Formiga Ester Marta Cristiane Bárbara Francielle Pretinha Fabiana Érika Maurine Rosana	(China) 2008 Beijing	Football	Women's tournament	21 August 2008
Silver	Márcio Araújo; Fábio Luiz Magalhães	(China) 2008 Beijing	Beach volleyball	Men's tournament	22 August 2008
Silver	Men's national volleyball team: Bruno Rezende Marcelo Elgarten André Heller Samuel Fuchs Gilberto Godoy Filho Murilo Endres André Nascimento Sérgio Santos Anderson Rodrigues Gustavo Endres Rodrigo Santana Dante Amaral	(China) 2008 Beijing	Volleyball	Men's tournament	24 August 2008
Bronze	Leandro Guilheiro	(China) 2008 Beijing	Judo	Men's 73 kg	11 August 2008
Bronze	Ketleyn Quadros	(China) 2008 Beijing	Judo	Women's 57 kg	11 August 2008
Bronze	Tiago Camilo	(China) 2008 Beijing	Judo	Men's 81 kg	12 August 2008
Bronze	César Cielo	(China) 2008 Beijing	Swimming	Men's 100 metre freestyle	14 August 2008
Bronze	Fernanda Oliveira; Isabel Swan	(China) 2008 Beijing	Sailing	Women's 470 class	18 August 2008
Bronze	Ricardo Santos; Emanuel Rego	(China) 2008 Beijing	Beach volleyball	Men's tournament	22 August 2008
Bronze	Men's under-23 football team: Diego Alves Renan Rafinha Alex Silva Thiago Silva Marcelo Ilsinho Breno Hernanes Anderson Lucas Ronaldinho Ramires Diego Thiago Neves Alexandre Pato Rafael Sóbis Jô	(China) 2008 Beijing	Football	Men's tournament	22 August 2008
Bronze	Lucimar de Moura; Rosângela Santos; Rosemar Coelho Neto; Thaissa Presti	(China) 2008 Beijing	Athletics	Women's 4 × 100 metres relay	29 March 2017
Bronze	Vicente Lenílson; Sandro Viana; Bruno de Barros; José Carlos Moreira	(China) 2008 Beijing	Athletics	Men's 4 × 100 metres relay	31 October 2019
Bronze	Natália Falavigna	(China) 2008 Beijing	Taekwondo	Women's +67 kg	23 August 2008
Gold	Sarah Menezes	(United Kingdom) 2012 London	Judo	Women's 48 kg	28 July 2012
Gold	Arthur Zanetti	(United Kingdom) 2012 London	Artistic gymnastics	Men's rings	6 August 2012
Gold	Women's national volleyball team: Fabiana Claudino Dani Lins Paula Pequeno Adenízia da Silva Thaísa Daher Jaqueline Carvalho Fernanda Ferreira Tandara Caixeta Natália Pereira Sheilla Castro Fabiana de Oliveira Fernanda Garay	(United Kingdom) 2012 London	Volleyball	Women's tournament	11 August 2012
Silver	Thiago Pereira	(United Kingdom) 2012 London	Swimming	Men's 400 metre individual medley	28 July 2012
Silver	Alison Cerutti; Emanuel Rego	(United Kingdom) 2012 London	Beach volleyball	Men's tournament	9 August 2012
Silver	Men's under-23 football team: Gabriel Rafael Thiago Silva Juan Jesus Sandro Marcelo Lucas Rômulo Leandro Damião Oscar Neymar Hulk Bruno Uvini Danilo Alex Sandro Ganso Alexandre Pato Neto	(United Kingdom) 2012 London	Football	Men's tournament	11 August 2012
Silver	Esquiva Falcão	(United Kingdom) 2012 London	Boxing	Men's middleweight	11 August 2012
Silver	Men's national volleyball team: Bruno Rezende Wallace de Souza Sidnei Santos Leandro Vissotto Neves Gilberto Godoy Filho Murilo Endres Sérgio Santos Thiago Alves Rodrigo Santana Lucas Saatkamp Ricardo Garcia Dante Amaral	(United Kingdom) 2012 London	Volleyball	Men's tournament	12 August 2012
Bronze	Felipe Kitadai	(United Kingdom) 2012 London	Judo	Men's 60 kg	28 July 2012
Bronze	Mayra Aguiar	(United Kingdom) 2012 London	Judo	Women's 78 kg	2 August 2012
Bronze	Rafael Silva	(United Kingdom) 2012 London	Judo	Men's +100 kg	3 August 2012
Bronze	César Cielo	(United Kingdom) 2012 London	Swimming	Men's 50 metre freestyle	3 August 2012
Bronze	Robert Scheidt; Bruno Prada	(United Kingdom) 2012 London	Sailing	Men's Star	5 August 2012
Bronze	Adriana Araújo	(United Kingdom) 2012 London	Boxing	Women's lightweight	8 August 2012
Bronze	Juliana Silva; Larissa França	(United Kingdom) 2012 London	Beach volleyball	Women's tournament	8 August 2012
Bronze	Yamaguchi Falcão	(United Kingdom) 2012 London	Boxing	Men's light heavyweight	10 August 2012
Bronze	Yane Marques	(United Kingdom) 2012 London	Modern pentathlon	Women's event	12 August 2012
Gold	Rafaela Silva	(Brazil) 2016 Rio de Janeiro	Judo	Women's 57 kg	8 August 2016
Gold	Thiago Braz	(Brazil) 2016 Rio de Janeiro	Athletics	Men's pole vault	15 August 2016
Gold	Robson Conceição	(Brazil) 2016 Rio de Janeiro	Boxing	Men's lightweight	16 August 2016
Gold	Martine Grael; Kahena Kunze	(Brazil) 2016 Rio de Janeiro	Sailing	Women's 49erFX	18 August 2016
Gold	Alison Cerutti; Bruno Oscar Schmidt	(Brazil) 2016 Rio de Janeiro	Beach volleyball	Men's tournament	18 August 2016
Gold	Men's under-23 football team: Weverton Zeca Rodrigo Caio Marquinhos Renato Augusto Douglas Santos Luan Rafinha Gabriel Barbosa Neymar Gabriel Jesus Walace William Luan Garcia Rodrigo Dourado Thiago Maia Felipe Anderson Uilson	(Brazil) 2016 Rio de Janeiro	Football	Men's tournament	20 August 2016
Gold	Men's national volleyball team: William Arjona Maurício Borges Silva Éder Carbonera Luiz Felipe Fonteles Evandro Guerra Ricardo Lucarelli Bruno Rezende Lucas Saatkamp Sérgio Santos Douglas Souza Maurício Souza Wallace de Souza	(Brazil) 2016 Rio de Janeiro	Volleyball	Men's tournament	21 August 2016
Silver	Felipe Wu	(Brazil) 2016 Rio de Janeiro	Shooting	Men's 10 metre air pistol	6 August 2016
Silver	Diego Hypólito	(Brazil) 2016 Rio de Janeiro	Artistic gymnastics	Men's floor	14 August 2016
Silver	Arthur Zanetti	(Brazil) 2016 Rio de Janeiro	Artistic gymnastics	Men's rings	15 August 2016
Silver	Isaquias Queiroz	(Brazil) 2016 Rio de Janeiro	Canoeing	Men's C-1 1000 metres	16 August 2016
Silver	Ágatha Bednarczuk; Bárbara Seixas	(Brazil) 2016 Rio de Janeiro	Beach volleyball	Women's tournament	17 August 2016
Silver	Isaquias Queiroz; Erlon Silva	(Brazil) 2016 Rio de Janeiro	Canoeing	Men's C-2 1000 metres	20 August 2016
Bronze	Mayra Aguiar	(Brazil) 2016 Rio de Janeiro	Judo	Women's 78 kg	11 August 2016
Bronze	Rafael Silva	(Brazil) 2016 Rio de Janeiro	Judo	Men's +100 kg	12 August 2016
Bronze	Arthur Mariano	(Brazil) 2016 Rio de Janeiro	Artistic gymnastics	Men's floor	14 August 2016
Bronze	Poliana Okimoto	(Brazil) 2016 Rio de Janeiro	Swimming	Women's marathon 10 kilometre	15 August 2016
Bronze	Isaquias Queiroz	(Brazil) 2016 Rio de Janeiro	Canoeing	Men's C-1 200 metres	18 August 2016
Bronze	Maicon Siqueira	(Brazil) 2016 Rio de Janeiro	Taekwondo	Men's +80 kg	20 August 2016
Gold	Ítalo Ferreira	(Japan) 2020 Tokyo	Surfing	Men's shortboard	27 July 2021
Gold	Rebeca Andrade	(Japan) 2020 Tokyo	Artistic gymnastics	Women's vault	1 August 2021
Gold	Martine Grael; Kahena Kunze	(Japan) 2020 Tokyo	Sailing	Women's 49erFX	3 August 2021
Gold	Ana Marcela Cunha	(Japan) 2020 Tokyo	Swimming	Women's marathon 10 kilometre	4 August 2021
Gold	Isaquias Queiroz	(Japan) 2020 Tokyo	Canoeing	Men's C-1 1000 metres	7 August 2021
Gold	Hebert Conceição	(Japan) 2020 Tokyo	Boxing	Men's middleweight	7 August 2021
Gold	Men's under-23 football team: Santos Dani Alves Nino Diego Carlos Guilherme Arana Douglas Luiz Bruno Guimarães Claudinho Antony Matheus Cunha Richarlison Brenno Bruno Fuchs Ricardo Graça Abner Gabriel Menino Matheus Henrique Reinier Malcom Paulinho Gabriel Martinelli Lucão	(Japan) 2020 Tokyo	Football	Men's tournament	7 August 2021
Silver	Kelvin Hoefler	(Japan) 2020 Tokyo	Skateboarding	Men's street	25 July 2021
Silver	Rayssa Leal	(Japan) 2020 Tokyo	Skateboarding	Women's street	26 July 2021
Silver	Rebeca Andrade	(Japan) 2020 Tokyo	Artistic gymnastics	Women's all-around	29 July 2021
Silver	Pedro Barros	(Japan) 2020 Tokyo	Skateboarding	Men's park	5 August 2021
Silver	Beatriz Ferreira	(Japan) 2020 Tokyo	Boxing	Women's lightweight	8 August 2021
Silver	Women's national volleyball team: Carol Gattaz Rosamaria Montibeller Macris Carneiro Roberta Ratzke Gabriela Guimarães Natália Pereira Ana Carolina da Silva Fernanda Garay Ana Cristina de Souza Camila Brait Ana Beatriz Corrêa Tandara Caixeta	(Japan) 2020 Tokyo	Volleyball	Women's tournament	8 August 2021
Bronze	Daniel Cargnin	(Japan) 2020 Tokyo	Judo	Men's 66 kg	25 July 2021
Bronze	Fernando Scheffer	(Japan) 2020 Tokyo	Swimming	Men's 200 metre freestyle	27 July 2021
Bronze	Mayra Aguiar	(Japan) 2020 Tokyo	Judo	Women's 78 kg	29 July 2021
Bronze	Laura Pigossi; Luisa Stefani	(Japan) 2020 Tokyo	Tennis	Women's doubles	31 July 2021
Bronze	Bruno Fratus	(Japan) 2020 Tokyo	Swimming	Men's 50 metre freestyle	1 August 2021
Bronze	Alison dos Santos	(Japan) 2020 Tokyo	Athletics	Men's 400 metres hurdles	3 August 2021
Bronze	Abner Teixeira	(Japan) 2020 Tokyo	Boxing	Men's heavyweight	3 August 2021
Bronze	Thiago Braz	(Japan) 2020 Tokyo	Athletics	Men's pole vault	3 August 2021
Gold	Beatriz Souza	(France) 2024 Paris	Judo	Women's +78 kg	2 August 2024
Gold	Rebeca Andrade	(France) 2024 Paris	Artistic gymnastics	Women's floor	5 August 2024
Gold	Ana Patrícia Ramos; Duda Lisboa	(France) 2024 Paris	Beach volleyball	Women's tournament	9 August 2024
Silver	Willian Lima	(France) 2024 Paris	Judo	Men's 66 kg	28 July 2024
Silver	Caio Bonfim	(France) 2024 Paris	Athletics	Men's 20 km walk	1 August 2024
Silver	Rebeca Andrade	(France) 2024 Paris	Artistic gymnastics	Women's all-around	1 August 2024
Silver	Rebeca Andrade	(France) 2024 Paris	Artistic gymnastics	Women's vault	3 August 2024
Silver	Tatiana Weston-Webb	(France) 2024 Paris	Surfing	Women's shortboard	6 August 2024
Silver	Isaquias Queiroz	(France) 2024 Paris	Canoeing	Men's C-1 1000 metres	9 August 2024
Silver	Women's national football team: Lorena Antônia Tarciane Rafaelle Souza Duda Sampaio Tamires Kerolin Vitória Yaya Adriana Marta Jheniffer Tainá Yasmim Ludmila Thaís Gabi Nunes Ana Vitória Gabi Portilho Priscila Angelina Lauren Luciana	(France) 2024 Paris	Football	Women's tournament	10 August 2024
Bronze	Larissa Pimenta	(France) 2024 Paris	Judo	Women's 52 kg	28 July 2024
Bronze	Rayssa Leal	(France) 2024 Paris	Skateboarding	Women's street	28 July 2024
Bronze	Rebeca Andrade; Jade Barbosa; Lorrane Oliveira; Flávia Saraiva; Júlia Soares	(France) 2024 Paris	Artistic gymnastics	Women's team all-around	30 July 2024
Bronze	Daniel Cargnin; Leonardo Gonçalves; Willian Lima; Rafael Macedo; Guilherme Schimidt; Rafael Silva; Larissa Pimenta; Ketleyn Quadros; Rafaela Silva; Beatriz Souza	(France) 2024 Paris	Judo	Mixed team	3 August 2024
Bronze	Beatriz Ferreira	(France) 2024 Paris	Boxing	Women's lightweight	3 August 2024
Bronze	Gabriel Medina	(France) 2024 Paris	Surfing	Men's shortboard	6 August 2024
Bronze	Augusto Akio	(France) 2024 Paris	Skateboarding	Men's park	7 August 2024
Bronze	Edival Pontes	(France) 2024 Paris	Taekwondo	Men's 68 kg	8 August 2024
Bronze	Alison dos Santos	(France) 2024 Paris	Athletics	Men's 400 metres hurdles	9 August 2024
Bronze	Women's national volleyball team: Nyeme Costa Diana Duarte Macris Carneiro Thaísa Daher Rosamaria Montibeller Roberta Ratzke Gabriela Guimarães Ana Cristina de Souza Natália Araújo Ana Carolina da Silva Júlia Bergmann Tainara Santos Lorenne Teixeira	(France) 2024 Paris	Volleyball	Women's tournament	10 August 2024

=== Winter Games ===
Medal	Name(s)	Games	Sport	Event	Date
Gold	Lucas Pinheiro Braathen	(Italy) 2026 Milano Cortina	Alpine skiing	Men's giant slalom	14 February 2026

== Multiple medalists ==
According to official data of the International Olympic Committee, this is a list of all athletes with at least two Olympic medals representing Brazil. The list is sorted by most gold medals, most silver medals, most bronze medals.

Rank	Athlete	Sex	Sport	Gold	Silver	Bronze	Games	Gold medal	Silver medal	Bronze medal	Total
1	Rebeca Andrade	W	Artistic gymnastics	2	3	1	(Japan) 2020 Tokyo	1	1	0	6
1	Rebeca Andrade	W	Artistic gymnastics	2	3	1	(France) 2024 Paris	1	2	1	6
2	Robert Scheidt	M	Sailing	2	2	1	(United States) 1996 Atlanta	1	0	0	5
2	Robert Scheidt	M	Sailing	2	2	1	(Australia) 2000 Sydney	0	1	0	5
2	Robert Scheidt	M	Sailing	2	2	1	(Greece) 2004 Athens	1	0	0	5
2	Robert Scheidt	M	Sailing	2	2	1	(China) 2008 Beijing	0	1	0	5
2	Robert Scheidt	M	Sailing	2	2	1	(United Kingdom) 2012 London	0	0	1	5
3	Sérgio Santos	M	Volleyball	2	2	0	(Greece) 2004 Athens	1	0	0	4
3	Sérgio Santos	M	Volleyball	2	2	0	(China) 2008 Beijing	0	1	0	4
3	Sérgio Santos	M	Volleyball	2	2	0	(United Kingdom) 2012 London	0	1	0	4
3	Sérgio Santos	M	Volleyball	2	2	0	(Brazil) 2016 Rio de Janeiro	1	0	0	4
4	Torben Grael	M	Sailing	2	1	2	(United States) 1984 Los Angeles	0	1	0	5
4	Torben Grael	M	Sailing	2	1	2	(South Korea) 1988 Seoul	0	0	1	5
4	Torben Grael	M	Sailing	2	1	2	(United States) 1996 Atlanta	1	0	0	5
4	Torben Grael	M	Sailing	2	1	2	(Australia) 2000 Sydney	0	0	1	5
4	Torben Grael	M	Sailing	2	1	2	(Greece) 2004 Athens	1	0	0	5
5	Marcelo Ferreira	M	Sailing	2	0	1	(United States) 1996 Atlanta	1	0	0	3
5	Marcelo Ferreira	M	Sailing	2	0	1	(Australia) 2000 Sydney	0	0	1	3
5	Marcelo Ferreira	M	Sailing	2	0	1	(Greece) 2004 Athens	1	0	0	3
5	Thaísa Daher	W	Volleyball	2	0	1	(China) 2008 Beijing	1	0	0	3
5	Thaísa Daher	W	Volleyball	2	0	1	(United Kingdom) 2012 London	1	0	0	3
5	Thaísa Daher	W	Volleyball	2	0	1	(France) 2024 Paris	0	0	1	3
7	Adhemar Ferreira da Silva	M	Athletics	2	0	0	(Finland) 1952 Helsinki	1	0	0	2
7	Adhemar Ferreira da Silva	M	Athletics	2	0	0	(Australia) 1956 Melbourne	1	0	0	2
7	Giovane Gávio	M	Volleyball	2	0	0	(Spain) 1992 Barcelona	1	0	0	2
7	Giovane Gávio	M	Volleyball	2	0	0	(Greece) 2004 Athens	1	0	0	2
7	Maurício Lima	M	Volleyball	2	0	0	(Spain) 1992 Barcelona	1	0	0	2
7	Maurício Lima	M	Volleyball	2	0	0	(Greece) 2004 Athens	1	0	0	2
7	Paula Pequeno	W	Volleyball	2	0	0	(China) 2008 Beijing	1	0	0	2
7	Paula Pequeno	W	Volleyball	2	0	0	(United Kingdom) 2012 London	1	0	0	2
7	Fabiana Claudino	W	Volleyball	2	0	0	(China) 2008 Beijing	1	0	0	2
7	Fabiana Claudino	W	Volleyball	2	0	0	(United Kingdom) 2012 London	1	0	0	2
7	Jaqueline Carvalho	W	Volleyball	2	0	0	(China) 2008 Beijing	1	0	0	2
7	Jaqueline Carvalho	W	Volleyball	2	0	0	(United Kingdom) 2012 London	1	0	0	2
7	Sheilla Castro	W	Volleyball	2	0	0	(China) 2008 Beijing	1	0	0	2
7	Sheilla Castro	W	Volleyball	2	0	0	(United Kingdom) 2012 London	1	0	0	2
7	Fabi	W	Volleyball	2	0	0	(China) 2008 Beijing	1	0	0	2
7	Fabi	W	Volleyball	2	0	0	(United Kingdom) 2012 London	1	0	0	2
7	Martine Grael	W	Sailing	2	0	0	(Brazil) 2016 Rio de Janeiro	1	0	0	2
7	Martine Grael	W	Sailing	2	0	0	(Japan) 2020 Tokyo	1	0	0	2
7	Kahena Kunze	W	Sailing	2	0	0	(Brazil) 2016 Rio de Janeiro	1	0	0	2
7	Kahena Kunze	W	Sailing	2	0	0	(Japan) 2020 Tokyo	1	0	0	2
17	Isaquias Queiroz	M	Canoeing	1	3	1	(Brazil) 2016 Rio de Janeiro	0	2	1	5
17	Isaquias Queiroz	M	Canoeing	1	3	1	(Japan) 2020 Tokyo	1	0	0	5
17	Isaquias Queiroz	M	Canoeing	1	3	1	(France) 2024 Paris	0	1	0	5
18	Giba	M	Volleyball	1	2	0	(Greece) 2004 Athens	1	0	0	3
18	Giba	M	Volleyball	1	2	0	(China) 2008 Beijing	0	1	0	3
18	Giba	M	Volleyball	1	2	0	(United Kingdom) 2012 London	0	1	0	3
18	Rodrigão	M	Volleyball	1	2	0	(Greece) 2004 Athens	1	0	0	3
18	Rodrigão	M	Volleyball	1	2	0	(China) 2008 Beijing	0	1	0	3
18	Rodrigão	M	Volleyball	1	2	0	(United Kingdom) 2012 London	0	1	0	3
18	Dante Amaral	M	Volleyball	1	2	0	(Greece) 2004 Athens	1	0	0	3
18	Dante Amaral	M	Volleyball	1	2	0	(China) 2008 Beijing	0	1	0	3
18	Dante Amaral	M	Volleyball	1	2	0	(United Kingdom) 2012 London	0	1	0	3
18	Bruno Rezende	M	Volleyball	1	2	0	(China) 2008 Beijing	0	1	0	3
18	Bruno Rezende	M	Volleyball	1	2	0	(United Kingdom) 2012 London	0	1	0	3
18	Bruno Rezende	M	Volleyball	1	2	0	(Brazil) 2016 Rio de Janeiro	1	0	0	3
22	Emanuel Rego	M	Beach volleyball	1	1	1	(Greece) 2004 Athens	1	0	0	3
22	Emanuel Rego	M	Beach volleyball	1	1	1	(China) 2008 Beijing	0	0	1	3
22	Emanuel Rego	M	Beach volleyball	1	1	1	(United Kingdom) 2012 London	0	1	0	3
22	Ricardo Santos	M	Beach volleyball	1	1	1	(Australia) 2000 Sydney	0	1	0	3
22	Ricardo Santos	M	Beach volleyball	1	1	1	(Greece) 2004 Athens	1	0	0	3
22	Ricardo Santos	M	Beach volleyball	1	1	1	(China) 2008 Beijing	0	0	1	3
24	Joaquim Cruz	M	Athletics	1	1	0	(United States) 1984 Los Angeles	1	0	0	2
24	Joaquim Cruz	M	Athletics	1	1	0	(South Korea) 1988 Seoul	0	1	0	2
24	Amauri Ribeiro	M	Volleyball	1	1	0	(United States) 1984 Los Angeles	0	1	0	2
24	Amauri Ribeiro	M	Volleyball	1	1	0	(Spain) 1992 Barcelona	1	0	0	2
24	Gustavo Endres	M	Volleyball	1	1	0	(Greece) 2004 Athens	1	0	0	2
24	Gustavo Endres	M	Volleyball	1	1	0	(China) 2008 Beijing	0	1	0	2
24	André Nascimento	M	Volleyball	1	1	0	(Greece) 2004 Athens	1	0	0	2
24	André Nascimento	M	Volleyball	1	1	0	(China) 2008 Beijing	0	1	0	2
24	André Heller	M	Volleyball	1	1	0	(Greece) 2004 Athens	1	0	0	2
24	André Heller	M	Volleyball	1	1	0	(China) 2008 Beijing	0	1	0	2
24	Anderson Rodrigues	M	Volleyball	1	1	0	(Greece) 2004 Athens	1	0	0	2
24	Anderson Rodrigues	M	Volleyball	1	1	0	(China) 2008 Beijing	0	1	0	2
24	Ricardinho Garcia	M	Volleyball	1	1	0	(Greece) 2004 Athens	1	0	0	2
24	Ricardinho Garcia	M	Volleyball	1	1	0	(United Kingdom) 2012 London	0	1	0	2
24	Arthur Zanetti	M	Gymnastics	1	1	0	(United Kingdom) 2012 London	1	0	0	2
24	Arthur Zanetti	M	Gymnastics	1	1	0	(Brazil) 2016 Rio de Janeiro	0	1	0	2
24	Alison Cerutti	M	Beach volleyball	1	1	0	(United Kingdom) 2012 London	0	1	0	2
24	Alison Cerutti	M	Beach volleyball	1	1	0	(Brazil) 2016 Rio de Janeiro	1	0	0	2
24	Neymar	M	Football	1	1	0	(United Kingdom) 2012 London	0	1	0	2
24	Neymar	M	Football	1	1	0	(Brazil) 2016 Rio de Janeiro	1	0	0	2
24	Wallace de Souza	M	Volleyball	1	1	0	(United Kingdom) 2012 London	0	1	0	2
24	Wallace de Souza	M	Volleyball	1	1	0	(Brazil) 2016 Rio de Janeiro	1	0	0	2
24	Lucão	M	Volleyball	1	1	0	(United Kingdom) 2012 London	0	1	0	2
24	Lucão	M	Volleyball	1	1	0	(Brazil) 2016 Rio de Janeiro	1	0	0	2
24	Fernanda Garay	W	Volleyball	1	1	0	(United Kingdom) 2012 London	1	0	0	2
24	Fernanda Garay	W	Volleyball	1	1	0	(Japan) 2020 Tokyo	0	1	0	2
24	Natália Pereira	W	Volleyball	1	1	0	(United Kingdom) 2012 London	1	0	0	2
24	Natália Pereira	W	Volleyball	1	1	0	(Japan) 2020 Tokyo	0	1	0	2
38	Hélia Fofão	W	Volleyball	1	0	2	(United States) 1996 Atlanta	0	0	1	3
38	Hélia Fofão	W	Volleyball	1	0	2	(Australia) 2000 Sydney	0	0	1	3
38	Hélia Fofão	W	Volleyball	1	0	2	(China) 2008 Beijing	1	0	0	3
38	Rodrigo Pessoa	M	Equestrian	1	0	2	(United States) 1996 Atlanta	0	0	1	3
38	Rodrigo Pessoa	M	Equestrian	1	0	2	(Australia) 2000 Sydney	0	0	1	3
38	Rodrigo Pessoa	M	Equestrian	1	0	2	(Greece) 2004 Athens	1	0	0	3
38	César Cielo	M	Swimming	1	0	2	(China) 2008 Beijing	1	0	1	3
38	César Cielo	M	Swimming	1	0	2	(United Kingdom) 2012 London	0	0	1	3
41	Guilherme Paraense	M	Shooting	1	0	1	(Belgium) 1920 Antwerp	1	0	1	2
41	Aurélio Miguel	M	Judo	1	0	1	(South Korea) 1988 Seoul	1	0	0	2
41	Aurélio Miguel	M	Judo	1	0	1	(United States) 1996 Atlanta	0	0	1	2
41	Sandra Pires	W	Beach volleyball	1	0	1	(United States) 1996 Atlanta	1	0	0	2
41	Sandra Pires	W	Beach volleyball	1	0	1	(Australia) 2000 Sydney	0	0	1	2
41	Walewska Oliveira	W	Volleyball	1	0	1	(Australia) 2000 Sydney	0	0	1	2
41	Walewska Oliveira	W	Volleyball	1	0	1	(China) 2008 Beijing	1	0	0	2
41	Thiago Braz	M	Athletics	1	0	1	(Brazil) 2016 Rio de Janeiro	1	0	0	2
41	Thiago Braz	M	Athletics	1	0	1	(Japan) 2020 Tokyo	0	0	1	2
41	Rafaela Silva	W	Judo	1	0	1	(Brazil) 2016 Rio de Janeiro	1	0	0	2
41	Rafaela Silva	W	Judo	1	0	1	(France) 2024 Paris	0	0	1	2
41	Beatriz Souza	W	Judo	1	0	1	(France) 2024 Paris	1	0	1	2
48	Marta	W	Football	0	3	0	(Greece) 2004 Athens	0	1	0	3
48	Marta	W	Football	0	3	0	(China) 2008 Beijing	0	1	0	3
48	Marta	W	Football	0	3	0	(France) 2024 Paris	0	1	0	3
49	Gustavo Borges	M	Swimming	0	2	2	(Spain) 1992 Barcelona	0	1	0	4
49	Gustavo Borges	M	Swimming	0	2	2	(United States) 1996 Atlanta	0	1	1	4
49	Gustavo Borges	M	Swimming	0	2	2	(Australia) 2000 Sydney	0	0	1	4
50	Ademir Roque	M	Football	0	2	0	(United States) 1984 Los Angeles	0	1	0	2
50	Ademir Roque	M	Football	0	2	0	(South Korea) 1988 Seoul	0	1	0	2
50	Luiz Carlos Winck	M	Football	0	2	0	(United States) 1984 Los Angeles	0	1	0	2
50	Luiz Carlos Winck	M	Football	0	2	0	(South Korea) 1988 Seoul	0	1	0	2
50	Adriana Behar	W	Beach volleyball	0	2	0	(Australia) 2000 Sydney	0	1	0	2
50	Adriana Behar	W	Beach volleyball	0	2	0	(Greece) 2004 Athens	0	1	0	2
50	Shelda Bede	W	Beach volleyball	0	2	0	(Australia) 2000 Sydney	0	1	0	2
50	Shelda Bede	W	Beach volleyball	0	2	0	(Greece) 2004 Athens	0	1	0	2
50	Daniela Alves	W	Football	0	2	0	(Greece) 2004 Athens	0	1	0	2
50	Daniela Alves	W	Football	0	2	0	(China) 2008 Beijing	0	1	0	2
50	Rosana dos Santos	W	Football	0	2	0	(Greece) 2004 Athens	0	1	0	2
50	Rosana dos Santos	W	Football	0	2	0	(China) 2008 Beijing	0	1	0	2
50	Renata Koki	W	Football	0	2	0	(Greece) 2004 Athens	0	1	0	2
50	Renata Koki	W	Football	0	2	0	(China) 2008 Beijing	0	1	0	2
50	Cristiane Rozeira	W	Football	0	2	0	(Greece) 2004 Athens	0	1	0	2
50	Cristiane Rozeira	W	Football	0	2	0	(China) 2008 Beijing	0	1	0	2
50	Maycon Santos	W	Football	0	2	0	(Greece) 2004 Athens	0	1	0	2
50	Maycon Santos	W	Football	0	2	0	(China) 2008 Beijing	0	1	0	2
50	Pretinha	W	Football	0	2	0	(Greece) 2004 Athens	0	1	0	2
50	Pretinha	W	Football	0	2	0	(China) 2008 Beijing	0	1	0	2
50	Formiga	W	Football	0	2	0	(Greece) 2004 Athens	0	1	0	2
50	Formiga	W	Football	0	2	0	(China) 2008 Beijing	0	1	0	2
50	Tânia Maranhão	W	Football	0	2	0	(Greece) 2004 Athens	0	1	0	2
50	Tânia Maranhão	W	Football	0	2	0	(China) 2008 Beijing	0	1	0	2
50	Andréia Suntaque	W	Football	0	2	0	(Greece) 2004 Athens	0	1	0	2
50	Andréia Suntaque	W	Football	0	2	0	(China) 2008 Beijing	0	1	0	2
50	Murilo Endres	M	Volleyball	0	2	0	(China) 2008 Beijing	0	1	0	2
50	Murilo Endres	M	Volleyball	0	2	0	(United Kingdom) 2012 London	0	1	0	2
64	Afrânio da Costa	M	Shooting	0	1	1	(Belgium) 1920 Antwerp	0	1	1	2
64	Nélson Prudêncio	M	Athletics	0	1	1	1968 Mexico City	0	1	0	2
64	Nélson Prudêncio	M	Athletics	0	1	1	(West Germany) 1972 Munich	0	0	1	2
64	Bebeto	M	Football	0	1	1	(South Korea) 1988 Seoul	0	1	0	2
64	Bebeto	M	Football	0	1	1	(United States) 1996 Atlanta	0	0	1	2
64	Adriana Samuel	W	Beach volleyball	0	1	1	(United States) 1996 Atlanta	0	1	0	2
64	Adriana Samuel	W	Beach volleyball	0	1	1	(Australia) 2000 Sydney	0	0	1	2
64	Janeth Arcain	W	Basketball	0	1	1	(United States) 1996 Atlanta	0	1	0	2
64	Janeth Arcain	W	Basketball	0	1	1	(Australia) 2000 Sydney	0	0	1	2
64	Silvinha Luz	W	Basketball	0	1	1	(United States) 1996 Atlanta	0	1	0	2
64	Silvinha Luz	W	Basketball	0	1	1	(Australia) 2000 Sydney	0	0	1	2
64	Alessandra Santos	W	Basketball	0	1	1	(United States) 1996 Atlanta	0	1	0	2
64	Alessandra Santos	W	Basketball	0	1	1	(Australia) 2000 Sydney	0	0	1	2
64	Adriana Santos	W	Basketball	0	1	1	(United States) 1996 Atlanta	0	1	0	2
64	Adriana Santos	W	Basketball	0	1	1	(Australia) 2000 Sydney	0	0	1	2
64	Cíntia Tuiú	W	Basketball	0	1	1	(United States) 1996 Atlanta	0	1	0	2
64	Cíntia Tuiú	W	Basketball	0	1	1	(Australia) 2000 Sydney	0	0	1	2
64	Marta Sobral	W	Basketball	0	1	1	(United States) 1996 Atlanta	0	1	0	2
64	Marta Sobral	W	Basketball	0	1	1	(Australia) 2000 Sydney	0	0	1	2
64	Édson Luciano	M	Athletics	0	1	1	(United States) 1996 Atlanta	0	0	1	2
64	Édson Luciano	M	Athletics	0	1	1	(Australia) 2000 Sydney	0	1	0	2
64	André Domingos	M	Athletics	0	1	1	(United States) 1996 Atlanta	0	0	1	2
64	André Domingos	M	Athletics	0	1	1	(Australia) 2000 Sydney	0	1	0	2
64	Tiago Camilo	M	Judo	0	1	1	(Australia) 2000 Sydney	0	1	0	2
64	Tiago Camilo	M	Judo	0	1	1	(China) 2008 Beijing	0	0	1	2
64	Vicente Lenílson	M	Athletics	0	1	1	(Australia) 2000 Sydney	0	1	0	2
64	Vicente Lenílson	M	Athletics	0	1	1	(China) 2008 Beijing	0	0	1	2
64	Bruno Prada	M	Sailing	0	1	1	(China) 2008 Beijing	0	1	0	2
64	Bruno Prada	M	Sailing	0	1	1	(United Kingdom) 2012 London	0	0	1	2
64	Marcelo Vieira	M	Football	0	1	1	(China) 2008 Beijing	0	0	1	2
64	Marcelo Vieira	M	Football	0	1	1	(United Kingdom) 2012 London	0	1	0	2
64	Alexandre Pato	M	Football	0	1	1	(China) 2008 Beijing	0	0	1	2
64	Alexandre Pato	M	Football	0	1	1	(United Kingdom) 2012 London	0	1	0	2
64	Thiago Silva	M	Football	0	1	1	(China) 2008 Beijing	0	0	1	2
64	Thiago Silva	M	Football	0	1	1	(United Kingdom) 2012 London	0	1	0	2
64	Rayssa Leal	F	Skateboarding	0	1	1	(Japan) 2020 Tokyo	0	1	0	2
64	Rayssa Leal	F	Skateboarding	0	1	1	(France) 2024 Paris	0	0	1	2
64	Beatriz Ferreira	F	Boxing	0	1	1	(Japan) 2020 Tokyo	0	1	0	2
64	Beatriz Ferreira	F	Boxing	0	1	1	(France) 2024 Paris	0	0	1	2
64	Ana Carolina da Silva	F	Volleyball	0	1	1	(Japan) 2020 Tokyo	0	1	0	2
64	Ana Carolina da Silva	F	Volleyball	0	1	1	(France) 2024 Paris	0	0	1	2
64	Ana Cristina de Souza	F	Volleyball	0	1	1	(Japan) 2020 Tokyo	0	1	0	2
64	Ana Cristina de Souza	F	Volleyball	0	1	1	(France) 2024 Paris	0	0	1	2
64	Gabriela Guimarães	F	Volleyball	0	1	1	(Japan) 2020 Tokyo	0	1	0	2
64	Gabriela Guimarães	F	Volleyball	0	1	1	(France) 2024 Paris	0	0	1	2
64	Macris Carneiro	F	Volleyball	0	1	1	(Japan) 2020 Tokyo	0	1	0	2
64	Macris Carneiro	F	Volleyball	0	1	1	(France) 2024 Paris	0	0	1	2
64	Roberta Ratzke	F	Volleyball	0	1	1	(Japan) 2020 Tokyo	0	1	0	2
64	Roberta Ratzke	F	Volleyball	0	1	1	(France) 2024 Paris	0	0	1	2
64	Rosamaria Montibeller	F	Volleyball	0	1	1	(Japan) 2020 Tokyo	0	1	0	2
64	Rosamaria Montibeller	F	Volleyball	0	1	1	(France) 2024 Paris	0	0	1	2
64	Willian Lima	M	Judo	0	1	1	(France) 2024 Paris	0	1	1	2
91	Mayra Aguiar	W	Judo	0	0	3	(United Kingdom) 2012 London	0	0	1	3
91	Mayra Aguiar	W	Judo	0	0	3	(Brazil) 2016 Rio de Janeiro	0	0	1	3
91	Mayra Aguiar	W	Judo	0	0	3	(Japan) 2020 Tokyo	0	0	1	3
91	Rafael Silva	M	Judo	0	0	3	(United Kingdom) 2012 London	0	0	1	3
91	Rafael Silva	M	Judo	0	0	3	(Brazil) 2016 Rio de Janeiro	0	0	1	3
91	Rafael Silva	M	Judo	0	0	3	(France) 2024 Paris	0	0	1	3
93	Algodão	M	Basketball	0	0	2	(United Kingdom) 1948 London	0	0	1	2
93	Algodão	M	Basketball	0	0	2	(Italy) 1960 Rome	0	0	1	2
93	Édson Bispo	M	Basketball	0	0	2	(Italy) 1960 Rome	0	0	1	2
93	Édson Bispo	M	Basketball	0	0	2	(Japan) 1964 Tokyo	0	0	1	2
93	Rosa Branca	M	Basketball	0	0	2	(Italy) 1960 Rome	0	0	1	2
93	Rosa Branca	M	Basketball	0	0	2	(Japan) 1964 Tokyo	0	0	1	2
93	Carlos Mosquito	M	Basketball	0	0	2	(Italy) 1960 Rome	0	0	1	2
93	Carlos Mosquito	M	Basketball	0	0	2	(Japan) 1964 Tokyo	0	0	1	2
93	Wlamir Marques	M	Basketball	0	0	2	(Italy) 1960 Rome	0	0	1	2
93	Wlamir Marques	M	Basketball	0	0	2	(Japan) 1964 Tokyo	0	0	1	2
93	Amaury Pasos	M	Basketball	0	0	2	(Italy) 1960 Rome	0	0	1	2
93	Amaury Pasos	M	Basketball	0	0	2	(Japan) 1964 Tokyo	0	0	1	2
93	Antônio Sucar	M	Basketball	0	0	2	(Italy) 1960 Rome	0	0	1	2
93	Antônio Sucar	M	Basketball	0	0	2	(Japan) 1964 Tokyo	0	0	1	2
93	Jatyr Schall	M	Basketball	0	0	2	(Italy) 1960 Rome	0	0	1	2
93	Jatyr Schall	M	Basketball	0	0	2	(Japan) 1964 Tokyo	0	0	1	2
93	Reinaldo Conrad	M	Sailing	0	0	2	1968 Mexico City	0	0	1	2
93	Reinaldo Conrad	M	Sailing	0	0	2	(Canada) 1976 Montreal	0	0	1	2
93	João Carlos de Oliveira	M	Athletics	0	0	2	(Canada) 1976 Montreal	0	0	1	2
93	João Carlos de Oliveira	M	Athletics	0	0	2	(Soviet Union) 1980 Moscow	0	0	1	2
93	Lars Grael	M	Sailing	0	0	2	(South Korea) 1988 Seoul	0	0	1	2
93	Lars Grael	M	Sailing	0	0	2	(United States) 1996 Atlanta	0	0	1	2
93	Róbson Caetano	M	Athletics	0	0	2	(South Korea) 1988 Seoul	0	0	1	2
93	Róbson Caetano	M	Athletics	0	0	2	(United States) 1996 Atlanta	0	0	1	2
93	Fernando Scherer	M	Swimming	0	0	2	(United States) 1996 Atlanta	0	0	1	2
93	Fernando Scherer	M	Swimming	0	0	2	(Australia) 2000 Sydney	0	0	1	2
93	Luiz Felipe de Azevedo	M	Equestrian	0	0	2	(United States) 1996 Atlanta	0	0	1	2
93	Luiz Felipe de Azevedo	M	Equestrian	0	0	2	(Australia) 2000 Sydney	0	0	1	2
93	André Johannpeter	M	Equestrian	0	0	2	(United States) 1996 Atlanta	0	0	1	2
93	André Johannpeter	M	Equestrian	0	0	2	(Australia) 2000 Sydney	0	0	1	2
93	Álvaro de Miranda Neto	M	Equestrian	0	0	2	(United States) 1996 Atlanta	0	0	1	2
93	Álvaro de Miranda Neto	M	Equestrian	0	0	2	(Australia) 2000 Sydney	0	0	1	2
93	Leila Barros	W	Volleyball	0	0	2	(United States) 1996 Atlanta	0	0	1	2
93	Leila Barros	W	Volleyball	0	0	2	(Australia) 2000 Sydney	0	0	1	2
93	Virna Dias	W	Volleyball	0	0	2	(United States) 1996 Atlanta	0	0	1	2
93	Virna Dias	W	Volleyball	0	0	2	(Australia) 2000 Sydney	0	0	1	2
93	Leandro Guilheiro	M	Judo	0	0	2	(Greece) 2004 Athens	0	0	1	2
93	Leandro Guilheiro	M	Judo	0	0	2	(China) 2008 Beijing	0	0	1	2
93	Ketleyn Quadros	W	Judo	0	0	2	(China) 2008 Beijing	0	0	1	2
93	Ketleyn Quadros	W	Judo	0	0	2	(France) 2024 Paris	0	0	1	2
93	Daniel Cargnin	M	Judo	0	0	2	(Japan) 2020 Tokyo	0	0	1	2
93	Daniel Cargnin	M	Judo	0	0	2	(France) 2024 Paris	0	0	1	2
93	Alison dos Santos	M	Athletics	0	0	2	(Japan) 2020 Tokyo	0	0	1	2
93	Alison dos Santos	M	Athletics	0	0	2	(France) 2024 Paris	0	0	1	2
93	Larissa Pimenta	W	Judo	0	0	2	(France) 2024 Paris	0	0	2	2

== Most successful Olympian progression ==
This table shows how the designation of most successful Brazilian Olympian has progressed over time.

Athlete	Sport	Date	Gender	1st place, gold medalist(s)	2nd place, silver medalist(s)	3rd place, bronze medalist(s)	Total
Afrânio da Costa	Shooting	2 August 1920	M	0	1	1	2
Guilherme Paraense	Shooting	3 August 1920	M	1	0	1	2
Adhemar da Silva	Athletics	27 November 1956	M	2	0	0	2
Robert Scheidt	Sailing	22 August 2004	M	2	1	0	3
Torben Grael	Sailing	28 August 2004	M	2	1	2	5
Robert Scheidt	Sailing	5 August 2012	M	2	2	1	5
Rebeca Andrade	Gymnastics	5 August 2024	W	2	3	1	6

== Summary by sport ==
=== Alpine skiing ===
Games	Athletes	Events	Gold	Silver	Bronze	Total
(Nazi Germany) 1936 Garmisch-Partenkirchen	0	0/2	0	0	0	0
(Switzerland) 1948 St. Moritz	0	0/6	0	0	0	0
(Norway) 1952 Oslo	0	0/6	0	0	0	0
(Italy) 1956 Cortina d'Ampezzo	0	0/6	0	0	0	0
(United States) 1960 Squaw Valley	0	0/6	0	0	0	0
(Austria) 1964 Innsbruck	0	0/6	0	0	0	0
(France) 1968 Grenoble	0	0/6	0	0	0	0
(Japan) 1972 Sapporo	0	0/6	0	0	0	0
(Austria) 1976 Innsbruck	0	0/6	0	0	0	0
(United States) 1980 Lake Placid	0	0/6	0	0	0	0
(Socialist Federal Republic of Yugoslavia) 1984 Sarajevo	0	0/6	0	0	0	0
(Canada) 1988 Calgary	0	0/10	0	0	0	0
(France) 1992 Albertville	7	7/10	0	0	0	0
(Norway) 1994 Lillehammer	1	1/10	0	0	0	0
(Japan) 1998 Nagano	1	1/10	0	0	0	0
(United States) 2002 Salt Lake City	2	2/10	0	0	0	0
(Italy) 2006 Turin	2	5/10	0	0	0	0
(Canada) 2010 Vancouver	2	4/10	0	0	0	0
(Russia) 2014 Sochi	2	4/10	0	0	0	0
(South Korea) 2018 Pyeongchang	1	3/11	0	0	0	0
(China) 2022 Beijing	1	2/11	0	0	0	0
(Italy) 2026 Milano Cortina	4	3/10	1	0	0	1
Total			1	0	0	1

Event	No. of appearances	First appearance	First medal	First gold medal	Gold	Silver	Bronze	Total	Best finish
Men's downhill	3/21	1992	—N/a	—N/a	0	0	0	0	41st (1992)
Women's downhill	0/21	—N/a	—N/a	—N/a	0	0	0	0	—N/a
Men's super-G	4/11	1992	—N/a	—N/a	0	0	0	0	37th (1998)
Women's super-G	1/11	1992	—N/a	—N/a	0	0	0	0	46th (1992)
Men's giant slalom	8/20	1992	2026	2026	1	0	0	1	(gold) (2026)
Women's giant slalom	5/20	1992	—N/a	—N/a	0	0	0	0	40th (1992)
Men's slalom	6/21	1992	—N/a	—N/a	0	0	0	0	27th (2026)
Women's slalom	3/21	2010	—N/a	—N/a	0	0	0	0	39th (2014)
Men's combined	2/13	1992	—N/a	—N/a	0	0	0	0	DNF (1992, 2006)
Women's combined	0/13	—N/a	—N/a	—N/a	0	0	0	0	—N/a
Mixed team	0/2	—N/a	—N/a	—N/a	0	0	0	0	—N/a

=== Archery ===
Games	Athletes	Events	Gold	Silver	Bronze	Total
(France) 1900 Paris	0	0/7	0	0	0	0
(United States) 1904 Saint Louis	0	0/6	0	0	0	0
(United Kingdom) 1908 London	0	0/3	0	0	0	0
(Belgium) 1920 Antwerp	0	0/10	0	0	0	0
(West Germany) 1972 Munich	0	0/2	0	0	0	0
(Canada) 1976 Montreal	0	0/2	0	0	0	0
(Soviet Union) 1980 Moscow	2	2/2	0	0	0	0
(United States) 1984 Los Angeles	1	1/2	0	0	0	0
(South Korea) 1988 Seoul	2	1/4	0	0	0	0
(Spain) 1992 Barcelona	2	1/4	0	0	0	0
(United States) 1996 Atlanta	0	0/4	0	0	0	0
(Australia) 2000 Sydney	0	0/4	0	0	0	0
(Greece) 2004 Athens	0	0/4	0	0	0	0
(China) 2008 Beijing	1	1/4	0	0	0	0
(United Kingdom) 2012 London	1	1/4	0	0	0	0
(Brazil) 2016 Rio de Janeiro	6	4/4	0	0	0	0
(Japan) 2020 Tokyo	2	3/5	0	0	0	0
(France) 2024 Paris	2	3/5	0	0	0	0
Total			0	0	0	0

Event	No. of appearances	First appearance	First medal	First gold medal	Gold	Silver	Bronze	Total	Best finish
Men's individual	9/14	1980	—N/a	—N/a	0	0	0	0	R16 (2020, 2024)
Women's individual	4/14	1980	—N/a	—N/a	0	0	0	0	R16 (2016, 2024)
Men's team	1/10	2016	—N/a	—N/a	0	0	0	0	R16 (2016)
Women's team	1/10	2016	—N/a	—N/a	0	0	0	0	R16 (2016)
Mixed team	2/2	2020	—N/a	—N/a	0	0	0	0	R16 (2024)

=== Artistic swimming ===
Games	Athletes	Events	Gold	Silver	Bronze	Total
(United States) 1984 Los Angeles	2	2/2	0	0	0	0
(South Korea) 1988 Seoul	3	2/2	0	0	0	0
(Spain) 1992 Barcelona	3	2/2	0	0	0	0
(United States) 1996 Atlanta	0	0/2	0	0	0	0
(Australia) 2000 Sydney	2	1/2	0	0	0	0
(Greece) 2004 Athens	2	1/2	0	0	0	0
(China) 2008 Beijing	2	1/2	0	0	0	0
(United Kingdom) 2012 London	2	1/2	0	0	0	0
(Brazil) 2016 Rio de Janeiro	9	2/2	0	0	0	0
(Japan) 2020 Tokyo	0	0/2	0	0	0	0
(France) 2024 Paris	0	0/2	0	0	0	0
Total			0	0	0	0

Event	No. of appearances	First appearance	First medal	First gold medal	Gold	Silver	Bronze	Total	Best finish
Women's solo	3/3	1984	—N/a	—N/a	0	0	0	0	13th (1984)
Women's duet	8/10	1984	—N/a	—N/a	0	0	0	0	11th (1984)
Women's team	1/8	2016	—N/a	—N/a	0	0	0	0	6th (2016)

=== Athletics ===
Games	Athletes	Events	Gold	Silver	Bronze	Total
(Kingdom of Greece) 1896 Athens	0	0/12	0	0	0	0
(France) 1900 Paris	0	0/23	0	0	0	0
(United States) 1904 St. Louis	0	0/25	0	0	0	0
(United Kingdom) 1908 London	0	0/26	0	0	0	0
(Sweden) 1912 Stockholm	0	0/30	0	0	0	0
(Belgium) 1920 Antwerp	0	0/29	0	0	0	0
(France) 1924 Paris	8	12/27	0	0	0	0
(Netherlands) 1928 Amsterdam	0	0/27	0	0	0	0
(United States) 1932 Los Angeles	19	13/29	0	0	0	0
(Nazi Germany) 1936 Berlin	10	9/29	0	0	0	0
(United Kingdom) 1948 London	12	11/33	0	0	0	0
(Finland) 1952 Helsinki	10	12/33	1	0	1	2
(Australia) 1956 Melbourne	6	7/33	1	0	0	1
(Italy) 1960 Rome	5	6/34	0	0	0	0
(Japan) 1964 Tokyo	1	1/36	0	0	0	0
(Mexico) 1968 México City	3	3/36	0	1	0	1
(West Germany) 1972 Munich	2	3/38	0	0	1	1
(Canada) 1976 Montreal	8	10/37	0	0	1	1
(Soviet Union) 1980 Moscow	11	11/38	0	0	1	1
(United States) 1984 Los Angeles	20	17/41	1	0	0	1
(South Korea) 1988 Seoul	20	15/42	0	1	1	2
(Spain) 1992 Barcelona	24	15/43	0	0	0	0
(United States) 1996 Atlanta	40	23/44	0	0	1	1
(Australia) 2000 Sydney	18	13/47	0	1	0	1
(Greece) 2004 Athens	34	25/46	0	0	1	1
(China) 2008 Beijing	41	32/47	1	0	2	3
(United Kingdom) 2012 London	30	24/47	0	0	0	0
(Brazil) 2016 Rio de Janeiro	67	38/47	1	0	0	1
(Japan) 2020 Tokyo	53	31/48	0	0	2	2
(France) 2024 Paris	47	10/48	0	1	1	2
Total			5	4	12	21

Event	No. of appearances	First appearance	First medal	First gold medal	Gold	Silver	Bronze	Total	Best finish
Men's 100 metres	19/30	1924	—N/a	—N/a	0	0	0	0	6th (1988)
Women's 100 metres	11/23	1948	—N/a	—N/a	0	0	0	0	SF (2012, 2016)
Men's 200 metres	18/29	1924	1988	—N/a	0	0	1	1	(bronze) (1988)
Women's 200 metres	10/20	1948	—N/a	—N/a	0	0	0	0	SF (2012)
Men's 400 metres	18/30	1924	—N/a	—N/a	0	0	0	0	4th (2000)
Women's 400 metres	8/15	1988	—N/a	—N/a	0	0	0	0	QF (1988, 1996)
Men's 800 metres	14/30	1924	1984	1984	1	1	0	2	(gold) (1984)
Women's 800 metres	5/18	1988	—N/a	—N/a	0	0	0	0	SF (1988, 2004)
Men's 1500 metres	10/30	1932	—N/a	—N/a	0	0	0	0	SF (1984, 1992, 2000, 2004)
Women's 1500 metres	0/14	—N/a	—N/a	—N/a	0	0	0	0	—N/a
Men's 3000 metres steeplechase	5/25	1988	—N/a	—N/a	0	0	0	0	9th (2016)
Women's 3000 metres steeplechase	4/5	2008	—N/a	—N/a	0	0	0	0	FR (2016, 2020, 2024)
Men's 5000 metres	3/26	1924	—N/a	—N/a	0	0	0	0	SF (1924)
Women's 5000 metres	1/8	1996	—N/a	—N/a	0	0	0	0	FR (1996)
Men's 10000 metres	3/26	1932	—N/a	—N/a	0	0	0	0	13th (1932)
Women's 10000 metres	2/10	1992	—N/a	—N/a	0	0	0	0	31st (2016)
Men's individual cross country	1/3	1924	—N/a	—N/a	0	0	0	0	DNF (1924)
Men's 20 kilometres walk	8/19	1988	2024	—N/a	0	1	0	1	(silver) (2024)
Women's 20 kilometres walk	5/7	2004	—N/a	—N/a	0	0	0	0	7th (2016)
Men's 50 kilometres walk	3/20	2004	—N/a	—N/a	0	0	0	0	9th (2016)
Men's marathon	12/30	1932	2004	—N/a	0	0	1	1	(bronze) (2004)
Women's marathon	8/11	1984	—N/a	—N/a	0	0	0	0	17th (1992)
Women's 80 metres hurdles	2/8	1952	—N/a	—N/a	0	0	0	0	SF (1952)
Women's 100 metres hurdles	4/14	2004	—N/a	—N/a	0	0	0	0	FR (2004, 2008, 2016, 2020)
Men's 110 metres hurdles	11/30	1924	—N/a	—N/a	0	0	0	0	7th (2004)
Men's 400 metres hurdles	14/28	1932	2020	—N/a	0	0	2	2	(bronze) (2020, 2024)
Women's 400 metres hurdles	4/11	2008	—N/a	—N/a	0	0	0	0	FR (2008, 2012, 2020, 2024)
Men's 4 × 100 metres relay	12/26	1948	1996	—N/a	0	1	2	3	(silver) (2000)
Women's 4 × 100 metres relay	6/23	1948	2008	—N/a	0	0	1	1	(bronze) (2008)
Men's 4 × 400 metres relay	6/26	1980	—N/a	—N/a	0	0	0	0	4th (1992)
Women's 4 × 400 metres relay	4/14	1988	—N/a	—N/a	0	0	0	0	FR (1988, 2004, 2012, 2016)
Mixed 4 × 400 metres relay	1/2	2020	—N/a	—N/a	0	0	0	0	FR (2020)
Mixed Marathon race walking relay	1/1	2024	—N/a	—N/a	0	0	0	0	7th (2024)
Men's long jump	14/30	1932	—N/a	—N/a	0	0	0	0	4th (1952)
Women's long jump	11/20	1948	2008	2008	1	0	0	1	(gold) (2008)
Men's triple jump	17/30	1948	1952	1952	2	1	3	6	(gold) (1952, 1956)
Women's triple jump	7/8	1996	—N/a	—N/a	0	0	0	0	FR (1996, 2000, 2008, 2016, 2020, 2024)
Men's high jump	11/30	1936	1952	—N/a	0	0	1	1	(bronze) (1952)
Women's high jump	6/23	1948	—N/a	—N/a	0	0	0	0	4th (1964)
Men's pole vault	8/30	1924	2016	2016	1	0	1	2	(gold) (2016)
Women's pole vault	4/7	2008	—N/a	—N/a	0	0	0	0	10th (2008)
Men's shot put	5/30	1924	—N/a	—N/a	0	0	0	0	4th (2020)
Women's shot put	7/20	1948	—N/a	—N/a	0	0	0	0	7th (2012)
Men's discus throw	2/30	1924	—N/a	—N/a	0	0	0	0	SF (1924)
Women's discus throw	6/23	2004	—N/a	—N/a	0	0	0	0	11th (2020)
Men's hammer throw	4/29	1924	—N/a	—N/a	0	0	0	0	12th (2016)
Women's hammer throw	0/7	—N/a	—N/a	—N/a	0	0	0	0	—N/a
Men's javelin throw	4/27	1924	—N/a	—N/a	0	0	0	0	11th (1932, 2024)
Women's javelin throw	5/22	2000	—N/a	—N/a	0	0	0	0	FR (2000, 2008, 2012, 2020, 2024)
Women's pentathlon	2/5	1968	—N/a	—N/a	0	0	0	0	14th (1980)
Women's heptathlon	4/11	1984	—N/a	—N/a	0	0	0	0	17th (2008)
Men's decathlon	7/26	1932	—N/a	—N/a	0	0	0	0	10th (2016)

=== Badminton ===
Games	Athletes	Events	Gold	Silver	Bronze	Total
(Spain) 1992 Barcelona	0	0/5	0	0	0	0
(United States) 1996 Atlanta	0	0/5	0	0	0	0
(Australia) 2000 Sydney	0	0/5	0	0	0	0
(Greece) 2004 Athens	0	0/5	0	0	0	0
(China) 2008 Beijing	0	0/5	0	0	0	0
(United Kingdom) 2012 London	0	0/5	0	0	0	0
(Brazil) 2016 Rio de Janeiro	2	2/5	0	0	0	0
(Japan) 2020 Tokyo	2	2/5	0	0	0	0
(France) 2024 Paris	2	2/5	0	0	0	0
Total			0	0	0	0

Event	No. of appearances	First appearance	First medal	First gold medal	Gold	Silver	Bronze	Total	Best finish
Men's singles	3/9	2016	—N/a	—N/a	0	0	0	0	R1 (2016, 2020, 2024)
Women's singles	3/9	2016	—N/a	—N/a	0	0	0	0	R1 (2016, 2020, 2024)
Men's doubles	0/9	—N/a	—N/a	—N/a	0	0	0	0	—N/a
Women's doubles	0/9	—N/a	—N/a	—N/a	0	0	0	0	—N/a
Mixed doubles	0/8	—N/a	—N/a	—N/a	0	0	0	0	—N/a

=== Baseball ===
Games	Athletes	Events	Gold	Silver	Bronze	Total
(Spain) 1992 Barcelona	0	0/1	0	0	0	0
(United States) 1996 Atlanta	0	0/1	0	0	0	0
(Australia) 2000 Sydney	0	0/1	0	0	0	0
(Greece) 2004 Athens	0	0/1	0	0	0	0
(China) 2008 Beijing	0	0/1	0	0	0	0
(Japan) 2020 Tokyo	0	0/1	0	0	0	0
Total			0	0	0	0

Event	No. of appearances	First appearance	First medal	First gold medal	Gold	Silver	Bronze	Total	Best finish
Men's tournament	0/6	—N/a	—N/a	—N/a	0	0	0	0	—N/a

=== Basketball ===
Games	Athletes	Events	Gold	Silver	Bronze	Total
(Nazi Germany) 1936 Berlin	12	1/1	0	0	0	0
(United Kingdom) 1948 London	12	1/1	0	0	1	1
(Finland) 1952 Helsinki	12	1/1	0	0	0	0
(Australia) 1956 Melbourne	12	1/1	0	0	0	0
(Italy) 1960 Rome	12	1/1	0	0	1	1
(Japan) 1964 Tokyo	12	1/1	0	0	1	1
(Mexico) 1968 México City	12	1/1	0	0	0	0
(West Germany) 1972 Munich	12	1/1	0	0	0	0
(Canada) 1976 Montreal	0	0/2	0	0	0	0
(Soviet Union) 1980 Moscow	12	1/2	0	0	0	0
(United States) 1984 Los Angeles	12	1/2	0	0	0	0
(South Korea) 1988 Seoul	12	1/2	0	0	0	0
(Spain) 1992 Barcelona	24	2/2	0	0	0	0
(United States) 1996 Atlanta	24	2/2	0	1	0	1
(Australia) 2000 Sydney	12	1/2	0	0	1	1
(Greece) 2004 Athens	12	1/2	0	0	0	0
(China) 2008 Beijing	12	1/2	0	0	0	0
(United Kingdom) 2012 London	24	2/2	0	0	0	0
(Brazil) 2016 Rio de Janeiro	24	2/2	0	0	0	0
(Japan) 2020 Tokyo	0	0/4	0	0	0	0
(France) 2024 Paris	12	1/4	0	0	0	0
Total			0	1	4	5

Event	No. of appearances	First appearance	First medal	First gold medal	Gold	Silver	Bronze	Total	Best finish
Men's 5-on-5 tournament	16/21	1936	1948	—N/a	0	0	3	3	(bronze) (1948, 1960, 1964)
Women's 5-on-5 tournament	7/13	1992	1996	—N/a	0	1	1	2	(silver) (1996)
Men's 3x3 tournament	0/2	—N/a	—N/a	—N/a	0	0	0	0	—N/a
Women's 3x3 tournament	0/2	—N/a	—N/a	—N/a	0	0	0	0	—N/a

=== Basque pelota ===
Games	Athletes	Events	Gold	Silver	Bronze	Total
(France) 1900 Paris	0	0/1	0	0	0	0
Total			0	0	0	0

Event	No. of appearances	First appearance	First medal	First gold medal	Gold	Silver	Bronze	Total	Best finish
Men's tournament	0/1	—N/a	—N/a	—N/a	0	0	0	0	—N/a

=== Biathlon ===
Games	Athletes	Events	Gold	Silver	Bronze	Total
(United States) 1960 Squaw Valley	0	0/1	0	0	0	0
(Austria) 1964 Innsbruck	0	0/1	0	0	0	0
(France) 1968 Grenoble	0	0/2	0	0	0	0
(Japan) 1972 Sapporo	0	0/2	0	0	0	0
(Austria) 1976 Innsbruck	0	0/2	0	0	0	0
(United States) 1980 Lake Placid	0	0/3	0	0	0	0
(Socialist Federal Republic of Yugoslavia) 1984 Sarajevo	0	0/3	0	0	0	0
(Canada) 1988 Calgary	0	0/3	0	0	0	0
(France) 1992 Albertville	0	0/6	0	0	0	0
(Norway) 1994 Lillehammer	0	0/6	0	0	0	0
(Japan) 1998 Nagano	0	0/6	0	0	0	0
(United States) 2002 Salt Lake City	0	0/8	0	0	0	0
(Italy) 2006 Milan	0	0/10	0	0	0	0
(Canada) 2010 Vancouver	0	0/10	0	0	0	0
(Russia) 2014 Sochi	1	2/11	0	0	0	0
(South Korea) 2018 Pyeongchang	0	0/11	0	0	0	0
(China) 2022 Beijing	0	0/11	0	0	0	0
(Italy) 2026 Milano Cortina	0	0/11	0	0	0	0
Total			0	0	0	0

Event	No. of appearances	First appearance	First medal	First gold medal	Gold	Silver	Bronze	Total	Best finish
Men's individual	0/18	—N/a	—N/a	—N/a	0	0	0	0	—N/a
Women's individual	1/10	2014	—N/a	—N/a	0	0	0	0	76th (2014)
Men's sprint	0/13	—N/a	—N/a	—N/a	0	0	0	0	—N/a
Women's sprint	1/10	2014	—N/a	—N/a	0	0	0	0	77th (2014)
Men's pursuit	0/7	—N/a	—N/a	—N/a	0	0	0	0	—N/a
Women's pursuit	0/7	—N/a	—N/a	—N/a	0	0	0	0	—N/a
Men's mass start	0/6	—N/a	—N/a	—N/a	0	0	0	0	—N/a
Women's mass start	0/6	—N/a	—N/a	—N/a	0	0	0	0	—N/a
Men's relay	0/16	—N/a	—N/a	—N/a	0	0	0	0	—N/a
Women's relay	0/10	—N/a	—N/a	—N/a	0	0	0	0	—N/a
Mixed relay	0/4	—N/a	—N/a	—N/a	0	0	0	0	—N/a

=== Bobsleigh ===
Games	Athletes	Events	Gold	Silver	Bronze	Total
(France) 1924 Chamonix	0	0/1	0	0	0	0
(Switzerland) 1928 St. Moritz	0	0/1	0	0	0	0
(United States) 1932 Lake Placid	0	0/2	0	0	0	0
(Nazi Germany) 1936 Garmisch-Partenkirchen	0	0/2	0	0	0	0
(Switzerland) 1948 St. Moritz	0	0/2	0	0	0	0
(Norway) 1952 Oslo	0	0/2	0	0	0	0
(Italy) 1956 Cortina d'Ampezzo	0	0/2	0	0	0	0
(Austria) 1964 Innsbruck	0	0/2	0	0	0	0
(France) 1968 Grenoble	0	0/2	0	0	0	0
(Japan) 1972 Sapporo	0	0/2	0	0	0	0
(Austria) 1976 Innsbruck	0	0/2	0	0	0	0
(United States) 1980 Lake Placid	0	0/2	0	0	0	0
(Socialist Federal Republic of Yugoslavia) 1984 Sarajevo	0	0/2	0	0	0	0
(Canada) 1988 Calgary	0	0/2	0	0	0	0
(France) 1992 Albertville	0	0/2	0	0	0	0
(Norway) 1994 Lillehammer	0	0/2	0	0	0	0
(Japan) 1998 Nagano	0	0/2	0	0	0	0
(United States) 2002 Salt Lake City	4	1/3	0	0	0	0
(Italy) 2006 Turin	4	1/3	0	0	0	0
(Canada) 2010 Vancouver	0	0/3	0	0	0	0
(Russia) 2014 Sochi	6	2/3	0	0	0	0
(South Korea) 2018 Pyeongchang	4	2/3	0	0	0	0
(China) 2022 Beijing	4	2/4	0	0	0	0
(Italy) 2026 Milano Cortina	4	2/4	0	0	0	0
Total			0	0	0	0

Event	No. of appearances	First appearance	First medal	First gold medal	Gold	Silver	Bronze	Total	Best finish
Women's monobob	0/2	—N/a	—N/a	—N/a	0	0	0	0	—N/a
Two-man	3/22	2018	—N/a	—N/a	0	0	0	0	24th (2026)
Two-woman	1/7	2014	—N/a	—N/a	0	0	0	0	19th (2014)
Four-man	6/24	2002	—N/a	—N/a	0	0	0	0	19th (2026)

=== Boxing ===
Games	Athletes	Events	Gold	Silver	Bronze	Total
(United States) 1904 St. Louis	0	0/7	0	0	0	0
(United Kingdom) 1908 London	0	0/5	0	0	0	0
(Belgium) 1920 Antwerp	0	0/8	0	0	0	0
(France) 1924 Paris	0	0/8	0	0	0	0
(Netherlands) 1928 Amsterdam	0	0/8	0	0	0	0
(United States) 1932 Los Angeles	0	0/8	0	0	0	0
(Nazi Germany) 1936 Munich	0	0/8	0	0	0	0
(United Kingdom) 1948 London	3	3/8	0	0	0	0
(Finland) 1952 Helsinki	6	6/10	0	0	0	0
(Australia) 1956 Melbourne	2	2/10	0	0	0	0
(Italy) 1960 Rome	5	5/10	0	0	0	0
(Japan) 1964 Tokyo	3	3/10	0	0	0	0
1968 Mexico City	2	2/11	0	0	1	1
(West Germany) 1972 Munich	2	2/11	0	0	0	0
(Canada) 1976 Montreal	4	4/11	0	0	0	0
(Soviet Union) 1980 Moscow	4	4/11	0	0	0	0
(United States) 1984 Los Angeles	0	0/12	0	0	0	0
(South Korea) 1988 Seoul	3	3/12	0	0	0	0
(Spain) 1992 Barcelona	4	4/12	0	0	0	0
(United States) 1996 Atlanta	6	6/12	0	0	0	0
(Australia) 2000 Sydney	6	6/12	0	0	0	0
(Greece) 2004 Athens	5	5/11	0	0	0	0
(China) 2008 Beijing	6	6/11	0	0	0	0
(United Kingdom) 2012 London	10	10/13	0	1	2	3
(Brazil) 2016 Rio de Janeiro	9	9/13	1	0	0	1
(Japan) 2020 Tokyo	7	7/13	1	1	1	3
(France) 2024 Paris	10	10/13	0	0	1	1
Total			2	2	5	9

Event	No. of appearances	First appearance	First medal	First gold medal	Gold	Silver	Bronze	Total	Best finish
Men's Light-Flyweight	2/13	2008	—N/a	—N/a	0	0	0	0	QF (2008)
Men's Flyweight	9/26	1960	1968	—N/a	0	0	1	1	(bronze) (1968)
Women's Flyweight	3/4	2012	—N/a	—N/a	0	0	0	0	R16 (2012, 2020, 2024)
Men's Bantamweight	7/25	1948	—N/a	—N/a	0	0	0	0	QF (1956, 2012)
Women's Bantamweight	1/1	2024	—N/a	—N/a	0	0	0	0	R16 (2024)
Men's Featherweight	9/25	1952	—N/a	—N/a	0	0	0	0	QF (1980)
Women's Featherweight	2/2	2020	—N/a	—N/a	0	0	0	0	QF (2024)
Men's Lightweight	9/27	1948	2016	2016	1	0	0	1	(gold) (2016)
Women's Lightweight	4/4	2012	2012	—N/a	0	1	2	3	(silver) (2020)
Men's Light-Welterweight	12/17	1952	—N/a	—N/a	0	0	0	0	QF (1964)
Men's Welterweight	4/26	1952	—N/a	—N/a	0	0	0	0	R3 (1968)
Women's Welterweight	1/2	2024	—N/a	—N/a	0	0	0	0	R16 (2024)
Men's Light-Middleweight	7/13	1952	—N/a	—N/a	0	0	0	0	QF (1952)
Men's Middleweight	10/27	1952	2012	2020	1	1	0	2	(gold) (2020)
Women's Middleweight	2/4	2012	—N/a	—N/a	0	0	0	0	QF (2016)
Men's Light-Heavyweight	10/24	1952	2012	—N/a	0	0	1	1	(bronze) (2012)
Men's Heavyweight	4/27	1948	2020	—N/a	0	0	1	1	(bronze) (2020)
Men's Super-Heavyweight	1/11	2024	—N/a	—N/a	0	0	0	0	R16 (2024)

=== Breaking ===
Games	Athletes	Events	Gold	Silver	Bronze	Total
(France) 2024 Paris	0	0/2	0	0	0	0
Total			0	0	0	0

Event	No. of appearances	First appearance	First medal	First gold medal	Gold	Silver	Bronze	Total	Best finish
B-Boys	0/1	—N/a	—N/a	—N/a	0	0	0	0	—N/a
B-Girls	0/1	—N/a	—N/a	—N/a	0	0	0	0	—N/a

=== Canoeing ===
Games	Athletes	Events	Gold	Silver	Bronze	Total
(Nazi Germany) 1936 Berlin	0	0/9	0	0	0	0
(United Kingdom) 1948 London	0	0/9	0	0	0	0
(Finland) 1952 Helsinki	0	0/9	0	0	0	0
(Australia) 1956 Melbourne	0	0/9	0	0	0	0
(Italy) 1960 Rome	0	0/7	0	0	0	0
(Japan) 1964 Tokyo	0	0/7	0	0	0	0
(Mexico) 1968 México City	0	0/7	0	0	0	0
(West Germany) 1972 Munich	0	0/11	0	0	0	0
(Canada) 1976 Montreal	0	0/11	0	0	0	0
(Soviet Union) 1980 Moscow	0	0/11	0	0	0	0
(United States) 1984 Los Angeles	0	0/12	0	0	0	0
(South Korea) 1988 Seoul	0	0/12	0	0	0	0
(Spain) 1992 Barcelona	6	6/16	0	0	0	0
(United States) 1996 Atlanta	3	4/16	0	0	0	0
(Australia) 2000 Sydney	4	5/16	0	0	0	0
(Greece) 2004 Athens	2	3/16	0	0	0	0
(China) 2008 Beijing	2	3/16	0	0	0	0
(United Kingdom) 2012 London	3	3/16	0	0	0	0
(Brazil) 2016 Rio de Janeiro	13	12/16	0	2	1	3
(Japan) 2020 Tokyo	5	6/16	1	0	0	1
(France) 2024 Paris	8	11/16	0	1	0	1
Total			1	3	1	5

Event	No. of appearances	First appearance	First medal	First gold medal	Gold	Silver	Bronze	Total	Best finish
Men's slalom C-1	5/10	1992	—N/a	—N/a	0	0	0	0	14th (2000)
Women's slalom C-1	2/2	2020	—N/a	—N/a	0	0	0	0	5th (2024)
Men's slalom C-2	1/8	2016	—N/a	—N/a	0	0	0	0	11th (2016)
Men's slalom K-1	5/10	1992	—N/a	—N/a	0	0	0	0	6th (2016)
Women's slalom K-1	5/10	2008	—N/a	—N/a	0	0	0	0	4th (2024)
Men's slalom KX-1	1/1	2024	—N/a	—N/a	0	0	0	0	27th (2024)
Women's slalom KX-1	1/1	2024	—N/a	—N/a	0	0	0	0	8th (2024)
Men's C-1 200 metres	2/2	2012	2016	—N/a	0	0	1	1	(bronze) (2016)
Women's C-1 200 metres	1/2	2024	—N/a	—N/a	0	0	0	0	13th (2024)
Men's C-1 500 metres	1/9	2008	—N/a	—N/a	0	0	0	0	SF (2008)
Men's C-1 1000 metres	4/21	2008	2016	2020	1	2	0	3	(gold) (2020)
Men's C-2 500 metres	1/10	—N/a	—N/a	—N/a	0	0	0	0	8th (2024)
Women's C-2 500 metres	0/2	—N/a	—N/a	—N/a	0	0	0	0	—N/a
Men's C-2 1000 metres	3/20	2012	2016	—N/a	0	1	0	1	(silver) (2016)
Men's K-1 200 metres	1/3	2016	—N/a	—N/a	0	0	0	0	FR (2016)
Women's K-1 200 metres	1/3	2016	—N/a	—N/a	0	0	0	0	SF (2016)
Men's K-1 500 metres	4/9	1992	—N/a	—N/a	0	0	0	0	SF (1996)
Women's K-1 500 metres	2/20	2016	—N/a	—N/a	0	0	0	0	SF (2024)
Men's K-1 1000 metres	6/21	1992	—N/a	—N/a	0	0	0	0	8th (1996)
Men's K-2 200 metres	1/2	2016	—N/a	—N/a	0	0	0	0	10th (2016)
Men's K-2 500 metres	3/10	1992	—N/a	—N/a	0	0	0	0	16th (2000)
Women's K-2 500 metres	0/17	—N/a	—N/a	—N/a	0	0	0	0	—N/a
Men's K-2 1000 metres	2/20	1992	—N/a	—N/a	0	0	0	0	15th (2000)
Men's K-4 500 metres	0/2	—N/a	—N/a	—N/a	0	0	0	0	—N/a
Women's K-4 500 metres	0/11	—N/a	—N/a	—N/a	0	0	0	0	—N/a
Men's K-4 1000 metres	1/14	2016	—N/a	—N/a	0	0	0	0	13th (2016)

=== Cricket ===
Games	Athletes	Events	Gold	Silver	Bronze	Total
(France) 1900 Paris	0	0/1	0	0	0	0
Total			0	0	0	0

Event	No. of appearances	First appearance	First medal	First gold medal	Gold	Silver	Bronze	Total	Best finish
Men's tournament	0/1	—N/a	—N/a	—N/a	0	0	0	0	—N/a

=== Croquet ===
Games	Athletes	Events	Gold	Silver	Bronze	Total
(France) 1900 Paris	0	0/3	0	0	0	0
Total			0	0	0	0

Event	No. of appearances	First appearance	First medal	First gold medal	Gold	Silver	Bronze	Total	Best finish
Singles, one ball	0/1	—N/a	—N/a	—N/a	0	0	0	0	—N/a
Singles, two balls	0/1	—N/a	—N/a	—N/a	0	0	0	0	—N/a
Doubles	0/1	—N/a	—N/a	—N/a	0	0	0	0	—N/a

=== Cross-country skiing ===
Games	Athletes	Events	Gold	Silver	Bronze	Total
(Switzerland) 1948 St. Moritz	0	0/3	0	0	0	0
(Norway) 1952 Oslo	0	0/4	0	0	0	0
(Italy) 1956 Cortina d'Ampezzo	0	0/6	0	0	0	0
(United States) 1960 Squaw Valley	0	0/6	0	0	0	0
(Austria) 1964 Innsbruck	0	0/7	0	0	0	0
(France) 1968 Grenoble	0	0/7	0	0	0	0
(Japan) 1972 Sapporo	0	0/7	0	0	0	0
(Austria) 1976 Innsbruck	0	0/7	0	0	0	0
(United States) 1980 Lake Placid	0	0/7	0	0	0	0
(Socialist Federal Republic of Yugoslavia) 1984 Sarajevo	0	0/8	0	0	0	0
(Canada) 1988 Calgary	0	0/8	0	0	0	0
(France) 1992 Albertville	0	0/10	0	0	0	0
(Norway) 1994 Lillehammer	0	0/10	0	0	0	0
(Japan) 1998 Nagano	0	0/10	0	0	0	0
(United States) 2002 Salt Lake City	2	2/12	0	0	0	0
(Italy) 2006 Turin	2	2/12	0	0	0	0
(Canada) 2010 Vancouver	2	2/12	0	0	0	0
(Russia) 2014 Sochi	2	2/12	0	0	0	0
(South Korea) 2018 Pyeongchang	2	2/12	0	0	0	0
(China) 2022 Beijing	3	7/12	0	0	0	0
(Italy) 2026 Milano Cortina	3	7/12	0	0	0	0
Total			0	0	0	0

Event	No. of appearances	First appearance	First medal	First gold medal	Gold	Silver	Bronze	Total	Best finish
Men's freestyle	5/22	2006	—N/a	—N/a	0	0	0	0	90th (2010, 2022)
Women's freestyle	6/17	2002	—N/a	—N/a	0	0	0	0	57th (2002)
Men's 50 kilometres	2/25	2002	—N/a	—N/a	0	0	0	0	57th (2002)
Women's 20, 30 and 50 kilometres	0/12	—N/a	—N/a	—N/a	0	0	0	0	—N/a
Men's skiathlon	1/10	2022	—N/a	—N/a	0	0	0	0	67th (2022)
Women's skiathlon	0/10	—N/a	—N/a	—N/a	0	0	0	0	—N/a
Men's 4 × 7,5/10 kilometres relay	0/22	—N/a	—N/a	—N/a	0	0	0	0	—N/a
Women's 4 × 5/7,5 kilometres relay	0/19	—N/a	—N/a	—N/a	0	0	0	0	—N/a
Men's sprint	3/7	2014	—N/a	—N/a	0	0	0	0	48th (2026)
Women's sprint	2/5	2014	—N/a	—N/a	0	0	0	0	65th (2014)
Men's team sprint	0/7	—N/a	—N/a	—N/a	0	0	0	0	—N/a
Women's team sprint	2/8	2022	—N/a	—N/a	0	0	0	0	21st (2026)

=== Cycling ===
Games	Athletes	Events	Gold	Silver	Bronze	Total
(Kingdom of Greece) 1896 Athens	0	0/6	0	0	0	0
(France) 1900 Paris	0	0/3	0	0	0	0
(United States) 1904 St. Louis	0	0/7	0	0	0	0
(United Kingdom) 1908 London	0	0/6	0	0	0	0
(Sweden) 1912 Stockholm	0	0/6	0	0	0	0
(Belgium) 1920 Antwerp	0	0/6	0	0	0	0
(France) 1924 Paris	0	0/6	0	0	0	0
(Netherlands) 1928 Amsterdam	0	0/6	0	0	0	0
(United States) 1932 Los Angeles	0	0/6	0	0	0	0
(Nazi Germany) 1936 Berlin	3	1/6	0	0	0	0
(United Kingdom) 1948 London	0	0/6	0	0	0	0
(Australia) 1956 Melbourne	1	2/6	0	0	0	0
(Italy) 1960 Rome	1	2/6	0	0	0	0
(Japan) 1964 Tokyo	0	0/7	0	0	0	0
1968 Mexico City	0	0/7	0	0	0	0
(West Germany) 1972 Munich	2	1/7	0	0	0	0
(Canada) 1976 Montreal	0	0/6	0	0	0	0
(Soviet Union) 1980 Moscow	6	4/6	0	0	0	0
(United States) 1984 Los Angeles	7	5/8	0	0	0	0
(South Korea) 1988 Seoul	8	6/9	0	0	0	0
(Spain) 1992 Barcelona	7	4/10	0	0	0	0
(United States) 1996 Atlanta	8	3/14	0	0	0	0
(Australia) 2000 Sydney	4	3/18	0	0	0	0
(Greece) 2004 Athens	6	4/18	0	0	0	0
(China) 2008 Beijing	5	4/18	0	0	0	0
(United Kingdom) 2012 London	9	7/18	0	0	0	0
(Brazil) 2016 Rio de Janeiro	10	7/18	0	0	0	0
(Japan) 2020 Tokyo	5	4/22	0	0	0	0
(France) 2024 Paris	6	6/22	0	0	0	0
Total			0	0	0	0

Event	No. of appearances	First appearance	First medal	First gold medal	Gold	Silver	Bronze	Total	Best finish
Men's individual road race	12/22	1936	—N/a	—N/a	0	0	0	0	20th (1988, 2008)
Women's individual road race	7/11	1992	—N/a	—N/a	0	0	0	0	7th (2016)
Men's road time trial	2/13	1996	—N/a	—N/a	0	0	0	0	26th (2012)
Men's road team time trial	3/14	1984	—N/a	—N/a	0	0	0	0	18th (1984, 1988)
Women's road time trial	1/8	2012	—N/a	—N/a	0	0	0	0	18th (2012)
Men's 1000m time trial	5/19	1956	—N/a	—N/a	0	0	0	0	6th (1960)
Men's individual sprint	3/28	1956	—N/a	—N/a	0	0	0	0	5th (1960)
Men's team sprint	0/7	—N/a	—N/a	—N/a	0	0	0	0	—N/a
Women's individual sprint	0/10	—N/a	—N/a	—N/a	0	0	0	0	—N/a
Women's team sprint	0/4	—N/a	—N/a	—N/a	0	0	0	0	—N/a
Men's individual pursuit	3/12	1980	—N/a	—N/a	0	0	0	0	13th (1980)
Men's team pursuit	2/25	1980	—N/a	—N/a	0	0	0	0	11th (1980)
Women's team pursuit	0/4	—N/a	—N/a	—N/a	0	0	0	0	—N/a
Men's points race	3/7	1984	—N/a	—N/a	0	0	0	0	24th (1988)
Men's keirin	0/7	—N/a	—N/a	—N/a	0	0	0	0	—N/a
Women's keirin	0/4	—N/a	—N/a	—N/a	0	0	0	0	—N/a
Men's madison	0/5	—N/a	—N/a	—N/a	0	0	0	0	—N/a
Women's madison	0/2	—N/a	—N/a	—N/a	0	0	0	0	—N/a
Men's omnium	1/4	2016	—N/a	—N/a	0	0	0	0	13th (2016)
Women's omnium	0/4	—N/a	—N/a	—N/a	0	0	0	0	—N/a
Men's cross-country	8/8	1996	—N/a	—N/a	0	0	0	0	13th (2020)
Women's cross-country	5/8	2004	—N/a	—N/a	0	0	0	0	18th (2004)
Men's BMX racing	3/5	2012	—N/a	—N/a	0	0	0	0	SF (2020)
Women's BMX racing	4/5	2012	—N/a	—N/a	0	0	0	0	SF (2012, 2016)
Men's BMX freestyle	1/2	2024	—N/a	—N/a	0	0	0	0	6th (2024)
Women's BMX freestyle	0/2	—N/a	—N/a	—N/a	0	0	0	0	—N/a

=== Diving ===
Games	Athletes	Events	Gold	Silver	Bronze	Total
(United States) 1904 St. Louis	0	0/2	0	0	0	0
(United Kingdom) 1908 London	0	0/2	0	0	0	0
(Sweden) 1912 Stockholm	0	0/4	0	0	0	0
(Belgium) 1920 Antwerp	1	3/5	0	0	0	0
(France) 1924 Paris	0	0/5	0	0	0	0
(Netherlands) 1928 Amsterdam	0	0/4	0	0	0	0
(United States) 1932 Los Angeles	0	0/4	0	0	0	0
(Nazi Germany) 1936 Berlin	0	0/4	0	0	0	0
(United Kingdom) 1948 London	3	2/4	0	0	0	0
(Finland) 1952 Helsinki	2	2/4	0	0	0	0
(Australia) 1956 Melbourne	2	2/4	0	0	0	0
(Italy) 1960 Rome	1	1/4	0	0	0	0
(Japan) 1964 Tokyo	0	0/4	0	0	0	0
1968 Mexico City	0	0/4	0	0	0	0
(West Germany) 1972 Munich	0	0/4	0	0	0	0
(Canada) 1976 Montreal	1	1/4	0	0	0	0
(Soviet Union) 1980 Moscow	1	2/4	0	0	0	0
(United States) 1984 Los Angeles	1	2/4	0	0	0	0
(South Korea) 1988 Seoul	1	1/4	0	0	0	0
(Spain) 1992 Barcelona	1	1/4	0	0	0	0
(United States) 1996 Atlanta	0	0/4	0	0	0	0
(Australia) 2000 Sydney	2	4/8	0	0	0	0
(Greece) 2004 Athens	4	4/8	0	0	0	0
(China) 2008 Beijing	4	3/8	0	0	0	0
(United Kingdom) 2012 London	3	3/8	0	0	0	0
(Brazil) 2016 Rio de Janeiro	9	8/8	0	0	0	0
(Japan) 2020 Tokyo	4	3/8	0	0	0	0
(France) 2024 Paris	1	1/8	0	0	0	0
Total			0	0	0	0

Event	No. of appearances	First appearance	First medal	First gold medal	Gold	Silver	Bronze	Total	Best finish
Men's 3 metre springboard	11/27	1920	—N/a	—N/a	0	0	0	0	6th (1952)
Men's synchronized 3 metre springboard	1/7	2016	—N/a	—N/a	0	0	0	0	8th (2016)
Women's 3 metre springboard	7/25	1984	—N/a	—N/a	0	0	0	0	18th (2004)
Women's synchronized 3 metre springboard	1/7	2016	—N/a	—N/a	0	0	0	0	8th (2016)
Men's 10 metre platform	11/28	1920	—N/a	—N/a	0	0	0	0	7th (1920)
Men's synchronized 10 metre platform	1/7	2016	—N/a	—N/a	0	0	0	0	8th (2016)
Women's 10 metre platform	9/26	1956	—N/a	—N/a	0	0	0	0	13th (1984)
Women's synchronized 10 metre platform	1/7	2016	—N/a	—N/a	0	0	0	0	8th (2016)
Men's plain high diving	1/3	1920	—N/a	—N/a	0	0	0	0	8th (1920)

=== Equestrian ===
Games	Athletes	Events	Gold	Silver	Bronze	Total
(United Kingdom) 1908 London	0	0/1	0	0	0	0
(Sweden) 1912 Stockholm	0	0/5	0	0	0	0
(Belgium) 1920 Antwerp	3	2/5	0	0	0	0
(France) 1924 Paris	0	0/5	0	0	0	0
(Netherlands) 1928 Amsterdam	0	0/6	0	0	0	0
(United States) 1932 Los Angeles	0	0/5	0	0	0	0
(Nazi Germany) 1936 Berlin	0	0/6	0	0	0	0
(United Kingdom) 1948 London	6	4/6	0	0	0	0
(Finland) 1952 Helsinki	4	3/6	0	0	0	0
(Australia) 1956 Melbourne	3	2/6	0	0	0	0
(Italy) 1960 Rome	3	2/5	0	0	0	0
(Japan) 1964 Tokyo	1	1/6	0	0	0	0
1968 Mexico City	3	2/6	0	0	0	0
(West Germany) 1972 Munich	3	2/6	0	0	0	0
(Canada) 1976 Montreal	0	0/6	0	0	0	0
(Soviet Union) 1980 Moscow	0	0/6	0	0	0	0
(United States) 1984 Los Angeles	4	2/6	0	0	0	0
(South Korea) 1988 Seoul	4	2/6	0	0	0	0
(Spain) 1992 Barcelona	6	3/6	0	0	0	0
(United States) 1996 Atlanta	9	4/6	0	0	1	1
(Australia) 2000 Sydney	11	5/6	0	0	1	1
(Greece) 2004 Athens	9	4/6	1	0	0	1
(China) 2008 Beijing	10	5/6	0	0	0	0
(United Kingdom) 2012 London	9	5/6	0	0	0	0
(Brazil) 2016 Rio de Janeiro	12	6/6	0	0	0	0
(Japan) 2020 Tokyo	9	5/6	0	0	0	0
(France) 2024 Paris	9	5/6	0	0	0	0
Total			1	0	2	3

Event	No. of appearances	First appearance	First medal	First gold medal	Gold	Silver	Bronze	Total	Best finish
Individual dressage	7/25	1972	—N/a	—N/a	0	0	0	0	23rd (2008)
Team dressage	1/21	2016	—N/a	—N/a	0	0	0	0	10th (2016)
Individual eventing	11/26	1948	—N/a	—N/a	0	0	0	0	7th (1948)
Team eventing	9/26	1948	—N/a	—N/a	0	0	0	0	6th (2000)
Individual jumping	18/27	1948	2004	2004	1	0	0	1	(gold) (2004)
Team jumping	16/26	1948	1996	—N/a	0	0	2	2	(bronze) (1996, 2000)

=== Fencing ===
Games	Athletes	Events	Gold	Silver	Bronze	Total
(Kingdom of Greece) 1896 Athens	0	0/3	0	0	0	0
(France) 1900 Paris	0	0/7	0	0	0	0
(United States) 1904 St. Louis	0	0/5	0	0	0	0
(United Kingdom) 1908 London	0	0/4	0	0	0	0
(Sweden) 1912 Stockholm	0	0/5	0	0	0	0
(Belgium) 1920 Antwerp	0	0/6	0	0	0	0
(France) 1924 Paris	0	0/7	0	0	0	0
(Netherlands) 1928 Amsterdam	0	0/7	0	0	0	0
(United States) 1932 Los Angeles	0	0/7	0	0	0	0
(Nazi Germany) 1936 Berlin	6	6/7	0	0	0	0
(United Kingdom) 1948 London	7	4/7	0	0	0	0
(Finland) 1952 Helsinki	5	3/7	0	0	0	0
(Australia) 1956 Melbourne	0	0/7	0	0	0	0
(Italy) 1960 Rome	0	0/8	0	0	0	0
(Japan) 1964 Tokyo	0	0/8	0	0	0	0
1968 Mexico City	4	2/8	0	0	0	0
(West Germany) 1972 Munich	0	0/8	0	0	0	0
(Canada) 1976 Montreal	1	1/8	0	0	0	0
(Soviet Union) 1980 Moscow	0	0/8	0	0	0	0
(United States) 1984 Los Angeles	0	0/8	0	0	0	0
(South Korea) 1988 Seoul	4	4/8	0	0	0	0
(Spain) 1992 Barcelona	4	2/8	0	0	0	0
(United States) 1996 Atlanta	0	0/10	0	0	0	0
(Australia) 2000 Sydney	1	1/10	0	0	0	0
(Greece) 2004 Athens	3	3/10	0	0	0	0
(China) 2008 Beijing	2	2/10	0	0	0	0
(United Kingdom) 2012 London	3	3/10	0	0	0	0
(Brazil) 2016 Rio de Janeiro	13	9/10	0	0	0	0
(Japan) 2020 Tokyo	2	2/12	0	0	0	0
(France) 2024 Paris	3	3/12	0	0	0	0
Total			0	0	0	0

Event	No. of appearances	First appearance	First medal	First gold medal	Gold	Silver	Bronze	Total	Best finish
Men's foil	9/29	1936	—N/a	—N/a	0	0	0	0	8th (2016)
Men's team foil	2/25	1936	—N/a	—N/a	0	0	0	0	8th (2016)
Women's foil	4/24	1936	—N/a	—N/a	0	0	0	0	QF (1936)
Women's team foil	0/15	—N/a	—N/a	—N/a	0	0	0	0	—N/a
Men's épée	9/29	1936	—N/a	—N/a	0	0	0	0	13th (1948)
Men's team épée	6/26	1936	—N/a	—N/a	0	0	0	0	9th (2016)
Women's épée	3/8	2016	—N/a	—N/a	0	0	0	0	6th (2016)
Women's team épée	1/7	2016	—N/a	—N/a	0	0	0	0	9th (2016)
Men's sabre	9/30	1936	—N/a	—N/a	0	0	0	0	R2 (1948, 2008)
Men's team sabre	0/26	—N/a	—N/a	—N/a	0	0	0	0	—N/a
Women's sabre	2/6	2004	—N/a	—N/a	0	0	0	0	R1 (2004)
Women's team sabre	0/4	—N/a	—N/a	—N/a	0	0	0	0	—N/a

=== Field hockey ===
Games	Athletes	Events	Gold	Silver	Bronze	Total
(United Kingdom) 1908 London	0	0/1	0	0	0	0
(Belgium) 1920 Antwerp	0	0/1	0	0	0	0
(Netherlands) 1928 Amsterdam	0	0/1	0	0	0	0
(United States) 1932 Los Angeles	0	0/1	0	0	0	0
(Nazi Germany) 1936 Berlin	0	0/1	0	0	0	0
(United Kingdom) 1948 London	0	0/1	0	0	0	0
(Finland) 1952 Helsinki	0	0/1	0	0	0	0
(Australia) 1956 Melbourne	0	0/1	0	0	0	0
(Italy) 1960 Rome	0	0/1	0	0	0	0
(Japan) 1964 Tokyo	0	0/1	0	0	0	0
1968 Mexico City	0	0/1	0	0	0	0
(West Germany) 1972 Munich	0	0/1	0	0	0	0
(Canada) 1976 Montreal	0	0/1	0	0	0	0
(Soviet Union) 1980 Moscow	0	0/2	0	0	0	0
(United States) 1984 Los Angeles	0	0/2	0	0	0	0
(South Korea) 1988 Seoul	0	0/2	0	0	0	0
(Spain) 1992 Barcelona	0	0/2	0	0	0	0
(United States) 1996 Atlanta	0	0/2	0	0	0	0
(Australia) 2000 Sydney	0	0/2	0	0	0	0
(Greece) 2004 Athens	0	0/2	0	0	0	0
(China) 2008 Beijing	0	0/2	0	0	0	0
(United Kingdom) 2012 London	0	0/2	0	0	0	0
(Brazil) 2016 Rio de Janeiro	16	1/2	0	0	0	0
(Japan) 2020 Tokyo	0	0/2	0	0	0	0
(France) 2024 Paris	0	0/2	0	0	0	0
Total			0	0	0	0

Event	No. of appearances	First appearance	First medal	First gold medal	Gold	Silver	Bronze	Total	Best finish
Men's tournament	1/25	2016	—N/a	—N/a	0	0	0	0	12th (2016)
Women's tournament	0/12	—N/a	—N/a	—N/a	0	0	0	0	—N/a

=== Figure skating ===
Games	Athletes	Events	Gold	Silver	Bronze	Total
(United Kingdom) 1908 London	0	0/4	0	0	0	0
(Belgium) 1920 Antwerp	0	0/3	0	0	0	0
(France) 1924 Chamonix	0	0/3	0	0	0	0
(Switzerland) 1928 St. Moritz	0	0/3	0	0	0	0
(United States) 1932 Lake Placid	0	0/3	0	0	0	0
(Nazi Germany) 1936 Garmisch-Partenkirchen	0	0/3	0	0	0	0
(Switzerland) 1948 St. Moritz	0	0/3	0	0	0	0
(Norway) 1952 Oslo	0	0/3	0	0	0	0
(Italy) 1956 Cortina d'Ampezzo	0	0/3	0	0	0	0
(United States) 1960 Squaw Valley	0	0/3	0	0	0	0
(Austria) 1964 Innsbruck	0	0/3	0	0	0	0
(France) 1968 Grenoble	0	0/3	0	0	0	0
(Austria) 1976 Innsbruck	0	0/4	0	0	0	0
(United States) 1980 Lake Placid	0	0/4	0	0	0	0
(Socialist Federal Republic of Yugoslavia) 1984 Sarajevo	0	0/4	0	0	0	0
(Canada) 1988 Calgary	0	0/4	0	0	0	0
(France) 1992 Albertville	0	0/4	0	0	0	0
(Norway) 1994 Lillehammer	0	0/4	0	0	0	0
(Japan) 1998 Albertville	0	0/4	0	0	0	0
(United States) 2002 Salt Lake City	0	0/4	0	0	0	0
(Italy) 2006 Milan	0	0/4	0	0	0	0
(Canada) 2010 Vancouver	0	0/4	0	0	0	0
(Russia) 2014 Sochi	1	1/5	0	0	0	0
(South Korea) 2018 Pyeongchang	1	1/5	0	0	0	0
(China) 2022 Beijing	0	0/5	0	0	0	0
(Italy) 2026 Milano Cortina	0	0/5	0	0	0	0
Total			0	0	0	0

Event	No. of appearances	First appearance	First medal	First gold medal	Gold	Silver	Bronze	Total	Best finish
Men's singles	0/27	—N/a	—N/a	—N/a	0	0	0	0	—N/a
Ladies' singles	2/27	2014	—N/a	—N/a	0	0	0	0	24th (2018)
Pair skating	0/27	—N/a	—N/a	—N/a	0	0	0	0	—N/a
Ice dance	0/14	—N/a	—N/a	—N/a	0	0	0	0	—N/a
Mixed team	0/4	—N/a	—N/a	—N/a	0	0	0	0	—N/a

=== Football ===
Games	Athletes	Events	Gold	Silver	Bronze	Total	Ranking
(Kingdom of Greece) 1896 Athens	0	0/1	0	0	0	0	
(France) 1900 Paris	0	0/1	0	0	0	0	
(United States) 1904 St. Louis	0	0/1	0	0	0	0	
(United Kingdom) 1908 London	0	0/1	0	0	0	0	
(Sweden) 1912 Stockholm	0	0/1	0	0	0	0	
(Belgium) 1920 Antwerp	0	0/1	0	0	0	0	
(France) 1924 Paris	0	0/1	0	0	0	0	
(Netherlands) 1928 Amsterdam	0	0/1	0	0	0	0	
(Nazi Germany) 1936 Berlin	0	0/1	0	0	0	0	
(United Kingdom) 1948 London	0	0/1	0	0	0	0	
(Finland) 1952 Helsinki	19	1/1	0	0	0	0	
(Australia) 1956 Melbourne	0	0/1	0	0	0	0	
(Italy) 1960 Rome	0	0/1	0	0	0	0	
(Japan) 1964 Tokyo	20	1/1	0	0	0	0	
1968 Mexico City	18	1/1	0	0	0	0	
(West Germany) 1972 Munich	19	1/1	0	0	0	0	
(Canada) 1976 Montreal	0	0/1	0	0	0	0	
(Soviet Union) 1980 Moscow	17	1/1	0	0	0	0	
(United States) 1984 Los Angeles	17	1/1	0	1	0	1	2
(South Korea) 1988 Seoul	20	1/1	0	1	0	1	2
(Spain) 1992 Barcelona	0	0/1	0	0	0	0	
(United States) 1996 Atlanta	36	2/2	0	0	1	1	5
(Australia) 2000 Sydney	36	2/2	0	0	0	0	
(Greece) 2004 Athens	18	1/2	0	1	0	1	3
(China) 2008 Beijing	36	2/2	0	1	1	2	3
(United Kingdom) 2012 London	36	2/2	0	1	0	1	3
(Brazil) 2016 Rio de Janeiro	36	2/2	1	0	0	1	2
(Japan) 2020 Tokyo	44	2/2	1	0	0	1	1
(France) 2024 Paris	22	1/2	0	1	0	1	3
Total			2	6	2	10	4

Event	No. of appearances	First appearance	First medal	First gold medal	Gold	Silver	Bronze	Total	Best finish
Men's tournament	11/28	1952	1984	2016	2	3	2	7	(gold) (2016, 2020)
Women's tournament	8/8	1996	2004	—N/a	0	3	0	3	(silver) (2004, 2008, 2024)

=== Freestyle skiing ===
Games	Athletes	Events	Gold	Silver	Bronze	Total
(France) 1992 Albertville	0	0/4	0	0	0	0
(Norway) 1994 Lillehammer	0	0/4	0	0	0	0
(Japan) 1998 Nagano	0	0/4	0	0	0	0
(United States) 2002 Salt Lake City	0	0/4	0	0	0	0
(Italy) 2006 Milan	0	0/4	0	0	0	0
(Canada) 2010 Vancouver	0	0/6	0	0	0	0
(Canada) 2010 Vancouver	0	0/6	0	0	0	0
(Russia) 2014 Sochi	1	1/10	0	0	0	0
(South Korea) 2018 Pyeongchang	0	0/10	0	0	0	0
(China) 2022 Beijing	1	1/13	0	0	0	0
(Italy) 2026 Milano Cortina	0	0/15	0	0	0	0
Total			0	0	0	0

Event	No. of appearances	First appearance	First medal	First gold medal	Gold	Silver	Bronze	Total	Best finish
Men's moguls	0/10	—N/a	—N/a	—N/a	0	0	0	0	—N/a
Women's moguls	1/10	2022	—N/a	—N/a	0	0	0	0	26th (2022)
Men's dual moguls	0/1	—N/a	—N/a	—N/a	0	0	0	0	—N/a
Women's dual moguls	0/1	—N/a	—N/a	—N/a	0	0	0	0	—N/a
Men's aerials	0/9	—N/a	—N/a	—N/a	0	0	0	0	—N/a
Women's aerials	1/9	2014	—N/a	—N/a	0	0	0	0	21st (2014)
Mixed team aerials	0/2	—N/a	—N/a	—N/a	0	0	0	0	—N/a
Men's ski cross	0/5	—N/a	—N/a	—N/a	0	0	0	0	—N/a
Women's ski cross	0/5	—N/a	—N/a	—N/a	0	0	0	0	—N/a
Men's half-pipe	0/4	—N/a	—N/a	—N/a	0	0	0	0	—N/a
Women's half-pipe	0/4	—N/a	—N/a	—N/a	0	0	0	0	—N/a
Men's slopestyle	0/4	—N/a	—N/a	—N/a	0	0	0	0	—N/a
Women's slopestyle	0/4	—N/a	—N/a	—N/a	0	0	0	0	—N/a
Men's big air	0/2	—N/a	—N/a	—N/a	0	0	0	0	—N/a
Women's big air	0/2	—N/a	—N/a	—N/a	0	0	0	0	—N/a

=== Golf ===
Games	Athletes	Events	Gold	Silver	Bronze	Total
(France) 1900 Paris	0	0/2	0	0	0	0
(United States) 1904 Saint Louis	0	0/2	0	0	0	0
(Brazil) 2016 Rio de Janeiro	3	2/2	0	0	0	0
(Japan) 2020 Tokyo	0	0/2	0	0	0	0
(France) 2024 Paris	0	0/2	0	0	0	0
Total			0	0	0	0

Event	No. of appearances	First appearance	First medal	First gold medal	Gold	Silver	Bronze	Total	Best finish
Men's individual	1/5	2016	—N/a	—N/a	0	0	0	0	39th (2016)
Women's individual	1/4	2016	—N/a	—N/a	0	0	0	0	52nd (2016)
Team	0/1	—N/a	—N/a	—N/a	0	0	0	0	—N/a

=== Gymnastics ===
Games	Athletes	Events	Gold	Silver	Bronze	Total
(Kingdom of Greece) 1896 Athens	0	0/8	0	0	0	0
(France) 1900 Paris	0	0/1	0	0	0	0
(United States) 1904 St. Louis	0	0/11	0	0	0	0
(United Kingdom) 1908 London	0	0/2	0	0	0	0
(Sweden) 1912 Stockholm	0	0/4	0	0	0	0
(Belgium) 1920 Antwerp	0	0/4	0	0	0	0
(France) 1924 Paris	0	0/9	0	0	0	0
(Netherlands) 1928 Amsterdam	0	0/8	0	0	0	0
(United States) 1932 Los Angeles	0	0/11	0	0	0	0
(Nazi Germany) 1936 Berlin	0	0/13	0	0	0	0
(United Kingdom) 1948 London	0	0/13	0	0	0	0
(Finland) 1952 Helsinki	19	0/15	0	0	0	0
(Australia) 1956 Melbourne	0	0/15	0	0	0	0
(Italy) 1960 Rome	0	0/14	0	0	0	0
(Japan) 1964 Tokyo	20	0/14	0	0	0	0
1968 Mexico City	18	0/14	0	0	0	0
(West Germany) 1972 Munich	19	0/14	0	0	0	0
(Canada) 1976 Montreal	0	0/14	0	0	0	0
(Soviet Union) 1980 Moscow	2	2/14	0	0	0	0
(United States) 1984 Los Angeles	3	3/15	0	0	0	0
(South Korea) 1988 Seoul	2	2/15	0	0	0	0
(Spain) 1992 Barcelona	3	3/15	0	0	0	0
(United States) 1996 Atlanta	0	0/15	0	0	0	0
(Australia) 2000 Sydney	8	2/18	0	0	0	0
(Greece) 2004 Athens	13	5/18	0	0	0	0
(China) 2008 Beijing	13	6/18	0	0	0	0
(United Kingdom) 2012 London	8	4/18	1	0	0	1
(Brazil) 2016 Rio de Janeiro	17	11/18	0	2	1	3
(Japan) 2020 Tokyo	7	8/18	1	1	0	2
(France) 2024 Paris	15	11/18	1	2	1	4
Total			3	5	2	10

Event	No. of appearances	First appearance	First medal	First gold medal	Gold	Silver	Bronze	Total	Best finish
Men's artistic team all-around	2/28	2016	—N/a	—N/a	0	0	0	0	6th (2016)
Women's artistic team all-around	5/22	2004	2024	—N/a	0	0	1	1	(bronze) (2024)
Men's artistic individual all-around	9/28	1980	—N/a	—N/a	0	0	0	0	9th (2016)
Women's artistic individual all-around	10/22	1980	2020	—N/a	0	2	0	2	(silver) (2020, 2024)
Men's vault	2/26	2016	—N/a	—N/a	0	0	0	0	8th (2020)
Women's vault	4/18	2008	2020	2020	1	1	0	2	(gold) (2020)
Men's floor	3/23	2008	2016	—N/a	0	1	1	2	(silver) (2016)
Women's floor	3/19	2004	2024	2024	1	0	0	1	(gold) (2024)
Men's pommel horse	0/26	—N/a	—N/a	—N/a	0	0	0	0	—N/a
Women's uneven bars	0/19	—N/a	—N/a	—N/a	0	0	0	0	—N/a
Men's rings	3/26	2012	2012	2012	1	1	0	2	(gold) (2012)
Women's balance beam	2/19	2016	—N/a	—N/a	0	0	0	0	4th (2024)
Men's parallel bars	0/26	—N/a	—N/a	—N/a	0	0	0	0	—N/a
Men's horizontal bar	2/26	2016	—N/a	—N/a	0	0	0	0	5th (2016)
Women's rhythmic individual all-around	4/11	1984	—N/a	—N/a	0	0	0	0	10th (2024)
Women's rhythmic group all-around	5/8	2000	—N/a	—N/a	0	0	0	0	8th (2000, 2004)
Men's trampoline	2/7	2016	—N/a	—N/a	0	0	0	0	12th (2016)
Women's trampoline	1/7	2024	—N/a	—N/a	0	0	0	0	15th (2024)

=== Handball ===
Games	Athletes	Events	Gold	Silver	Bronze	Total
(Nazi Germany) 1936 Berlin	0	0/1	0	0	0	0
(West Germany) 1972 Munich	0	0/1	0	0	0	0
(Canada) 1976 Montreal	0	0/2	0	0	0	0
(Soviet Union) 1980 Moscow	0	0/2	0	0	0	0
(United States) 1984 Los Angeles	0	0/2	0	0	0	0
(South Korea) 1988 Seoul	0	0/2	0	0	0	0
(Spain) 1992 Barcelona	14	1/2	0	0	0	0
(United States) 1996 Atlanta	14	1/2	0	0	0	0
(Australia) 2000 Sydney	14	1/2	0	0	0	0
(Greece) 2004 Athens	28	2/2	0	0	0	0
(China) 2008 Beijing	28	2/2	0	0	0	0
(United Kingdom) 2012 London	14	1/2	0	0	0	0
(Brazil) 2016 Rio de Janeiro	28	2/2	0	0	0	0
(Japan) 2020 Tokyo	31	2/2	0	0	0	0
(France) 2024 Paris	21	1/2	0	0	0	0
Total			0	0	0	0

Event	No. of appearances	First appearance	First medal	First gold medal	Gold	Silver	Bronze	Total	Best finish
Men's tournament	6/15	1992	—N/a	—N/a	0	0	0	0	7th (2016)
Women's tournament	7/13	2000	—N/a	—N/a	0	0	0	0	5th (2016)

=== Jeu de paume ===
Games	Athletes	Events	Gold	Silver	Bronze	Total
(United Kingdom) 1908 London	0	0/1	0	0	0	0
Total			0	0	0	0

Event	No. of appearances	First appearance	First medal	First gold medal	Gold	Silver	Bronze	Total	Best finish
Men's singles	0/1	—N/a	—N/a	—N/a	0	0	0	0	—N/a

=== Judo ===
Games	Athletes	Events	Gold	Silver	Bronze	Total
(Japan) 1964 Tokyo	1	1/4	0	0	0	0
(West Germany) 1972 Munich	2	3/6	0	0	1	1
(Canada) 1976 Montreal	3	3/6	0	0	0	0
(Soviet Union) 1980 Moscow	7	8/8	0	0	0	0
(United States) 1984 Los Angeles	7	7/8	0	1	2	3
(South Korea) 1988 Seoul	7	7/7	1	0	0	1
(Spain) 1992 Barcelona	14	14/14	1	0	0	1
(United States) 1996 Atlanta	12	12/14	0	0	2	2
(Australia) 2000 Sydney	12	12/14	0	2	0	2
(Greece) 2004 Athens	12	12/14	0	0	2	2
(China) 2008 Beijing	13	13/14	0	0	3	3
(United Kingdom) 2012 London	14	14/14	1	0	3	4
(Brazil) 2016 Rio de Janeiro	14	14/14	1	0	2	3
(Japan) 2020 Tokyo	13	14/15	0	0	2	2
(France) 2024 Paris	13	14/15	1	1	2	4
Total			5	4	19	28

Event	No. of appearances	First appearance	First medal	First gold medal	Gold	Silver	Bronze	Total	Best finish
Men's Extra Lightweight	12/12	1980	2012	—N/a	0	0	1	1	(bronze) (2012)
Women's Extra Lightweight	9/9	1992	2012	2012	1	0	0	1	(gold) (2012)
Men's Half Lightweight	12/12	1980	1992	1992	1	1	2	4	(gold) (1992)
Women's Half Lightweight	7/9	1992	2024	—N/a	0	0	1	1	(bronze) (2024)
Men's Lightweight	12/15	1980	1984	—N/a	0	1	3	4	(silver) (2000)
Women's Lightweight	8/9	1992	2008	2016	1	0	1	2	(gold) (2016)
Men's Half Middleweight	13/14	1976	2004	—N/a	0	0	2	2	(bronze) (2004, 2008)
Women's Half Middleweight	9/9	1992	—N/a	—N/a	0	0	0	0	5th (2016)
Men's Middleweight	15/15	1964	1984	—N/a	0	1	1	2	(silver) (2000)
Women's Middleweight	6/9	1992	—N/a	—N/a	0	0	0	0	9th (2016)
Men's Half Heavyweight	14/14	1972	1972	1988	1	1	2	4	(gold) (1988)
Women's Half Heavyweight	8/9	1992	2012	—N/a	0	0	3	3	(bronze) (2012, 2016, 2020)
Men's Heavyweight	12/15	1980	2012	—N/a	0	0	2	2	(bronze) (2012, 2016)
Women's Heavyweight	6/8	1992	2024	2024	1	0	0	1	(gold) (2024)
Men's Open	2/5	1972	—N/a	—N/a	0	0	0	0	9th (1972)
Mixed Team	2/2	2020	2024	—N/a	0	0	1	1	(bronze) (2024)

=== Karate ===
Games	Athletes	Events	Gold	Silver	Bronze	Total
(Japan) 2020 Tokyo	0	0/8	0	0	0	0
Total			0	0	0	0

Event	No. of appearances	First appearance	First medal	First gold medal	Gold	Silver	Bronze	Total	Best finish
Men's kata	0/1	—N/a	—N/a	—N/a	0	0	0	0	—N/a
Women's kata	0/1	—N/a	—N/a	—N/a	0	0	0	0	—N/a
Men's kumite 67 kg	0/1	—N/a	—N/a	—N/a	0	0	0	0	—N/a
Women's kumite 55 kg	0/1	—N/a	—N/a	—N/a	0	0	0	0	—N/a
Men's kumite 75 kg	0/1	—N/a	—N/a	—N/a	0	0	0	0	—N/a
Women's kumite 61 kg	0/1	—N/a	—N/a	—N/a	0	0	0	0	—N/a
Men's kumite +75 kg	0/1	—N/a	—N/a	—N/a	0	0	0	0	—N/a
Women's kumite +61 kg	0/1	—N/a	—N/a	—N/a	0	0	0	0	—N/a

=== Lacrosse ===
Games	Athletes	Events	Gold	Silver	Bronze	Total
(United States) 1904 St. Louis	0	0/1	0	0	0	0
(United Kingdom) 1908 London	0	0/1	0	0	0	0
Total			0	0	0	0

Event	No. of appearances	First appearance	First medal	First gold medal	Gold	Silver	Bronze	Total	Best finish
Men's tournament	0/2	—N/a	—N/a	—N/a	0	0	0	0	—N/a

=== Luge ===
Games	Athletes	Events	Gold	Silver	Bronze	Total
(Austria) 1964 Innsbruck	0	0/3	0	0	0	0
(France) 1968 Grenoble	0	0/3	0	0	0	0
(Japan) 1972 Sapporo	0	0/3	0	0	0	0
(Austria) 1976 Innsbruck	0	0/3	0	0	0	0
(United States) 1980 Lake Placid	0	0/3	0	0	0	0
(Socialist Federal Republic of Yugoslavia) 1984 Saravejo	0	0/3	0	0	0	0
(Canada) 1988 Calgary	0	0/3	0	0	0	0
(France) 1992 Albertville	0	0/3	0	0	0	0
(Norway) 1994 Lillehammer	0	0/3	0	0	0	0
(Japan) 1998 Nagano	0	0/3	0	0	0	0
(United States) 2002 Salt Lake City	2	1/3	0	0	0	0
(Italy) 2006 Milan	0	0/3	0	0	0	0
(Canada) 2010 Vancouver	0	0/3	0	0	0	0
(Russia) 2014 Sochi	0	0/4	0	0	0	0
(South Korea) 2018 Pyeongchang	0	0/4	0	0	0	0
(China) 2022 Beijing	0	0/4	0	0	0	0
(Italy) 2026 Milano Cortina	0	0/5	0	0	0	0
Total			0	0	0	0

Event	No. of appearances	First appearance	First medal	First gold medal	Gold	Silver	Bronze	Total	Best finish
Men's singles	1/17	2002	—N/a	—N/a	0	0	0	0	45th (2002)
Women's singles	0/17	—N/a	—N/a	—N/a	0	0	0	0	—N/a
Men's doubles	0/17	—N/a	—N/a	—N/a	0	0	0	0	—N/a
Women's doubles	0/1	—N/a	—N/a	—N/a	0	0	0	0	—N/a
Mixed relay	0/4	—N/a	—N/a	—N/a	0	0	0	0	—N/a

=== Modern pentathlon ===
Games	Athletes	Events	Gold	Silver	Bronze	Total
(Sweden) 1912 Stockholm	0	0/1	0	0	0	0
(Belgium) 1920 Antwerp	0	0/1	0	0	0	0
(France) 1924 Paris	0	0/1	0	0	0	0
(Netherlands) 1928 Amsterdam	0	0/1	0	0	0	0
(United States) 1932 Los Angeles	0	0/1	0	0	0	0
(Nazi Germany) 1936 Berlin	3	1/1	0	0	0	0
(United Kingdom) 1948 London	3	1/1	0	0	0	0
(Finland) 1952 Helsinki	3	2/2	0	0	0	0
(Australia) 1956 Melbourne	3	2/2	0	0	0	0
(Italy) 1960 Rome	3	2/2	0	0	0	0
(Japan) 1964 Tokyo	1	1/2	0	0	0	0
1968 Mexico City	0	0/2	0	0	0	0
(West Germany) 1972 Munich	0	0/2	0	0	0	0
(Canada) 1976 Montreal	0	0/2	0	0	0	0
(Soviet Union) 1980 Moscow	0	0/2	0	0	0	0
(United States) 1984 Los Angeles	0	0/2	0	0	0	0
(South Korea) 1988 Seoul	0	0/2	0	0	0	0
(Spain) 1992 Barcelona	0	0/2	0	0	0	0
(United States) 1996 Atlanta	0	0/2	0	0	0	0
(Australia) 2000 Sydney	2	0/2	0	0	0	0
(Greece) 2004 Athens	2	2/2	0	0	0	0
(China) 2008 Beijing	1	1/2	0	0	0	0
(United Kingdom) 2012 London	1	1/2	0	0	1	1
(Brazil) 2016 Rio de Janeiro	2	2/2	0	0	0	0
(Japan) 2020 Tokyo	1	1/2	0	0	0	0
(France) 2024 Paris	1	1/2	0	0	0	0
Total			0	0	1	1

Event	No. of appearances	First appearance	First medal	First gold medal	Gold	Silver	Bronze	Total	Best finish
Men's individual	8/26	1936	—N/a	—N/a	0	0	0	0	10th (1952)
Women's individual	6/7	2004	2012	—N/a	0	0	1	1	(bronze) (2012)
Men's team	3/11	1952	—N/a	—N/a	0	0	0	0	6th (1952)

=== Polo ===
Games	Athletes	Events	Gold	Silver	Bronze	Total
(France) 1900 Paris	0	0/1	0	0	0	0
(United Kingdom) 1908 London	0	0/1	0	0	0	0
(Belgium) 1920 Antwerp	0	0/1	0	0	0	0
(France) 1924 Paris	0	0/1	0	0	0	0
(Nazi Germany) 1936 Berlin	0	0/1	0	0	0	0
Total			0	0	0	0

Event	No. of appearances	First appearance	First medal	First gold medal	Gold	Silver	Bronze	Total	Best finish
Men's tournament	0/5	—N/a	—N/a	—N/a	0	0	0	0	—N/a

=== Rackets ===
Games	Athletes	Events	Gold	Silver	Bronze	Total
(United Kingdom) 1908 London	0	0/2	0	0	0	0
Total			0	0	0	0

Event	No. of appearances	First appearance	First medal	First gold medal	Gold	Silver	Bronze	Total	Best finish
Men's singles	0/1	—N/a	—N/a	—N/a	0	0	0	0	—N/a
Men's doubles	0/1	—N/a	—N/a	—N/a	0	0	0	0	—N/a

=== Roque ===
Games	Athletes	Events	Gold	Silver	Bronze	Total
(United States) 1904 St. Louis	0	0/1	0	0	0	0
Total			0	0	0	0

Event	No. of appearances	First appearance	First medal	First gold medal	Gold	Silver	Bronze	Total	Best finish
Men's tournament	0/1	—N/a	—N/a	—N/a	0	0	0	0	—N/a

=== Rowing ===
Games	Athletes	Events	Gold	Silver	Bronze	Total
(Belgium) 1920 Antwerp	5	1/5	0	0	0	0
(France) 1924 Paris	2	1/7	0	0	0	0
(United States) 1932 Los Angeles	18	4/7	0	0	0	0
(Nazi Germany) 1936 Berlin	21	6/7	0	0	0	0
(United Kingdom) 1948 London	2	1/7	0	0	0	0
(Finland) 1952 Helsinki	3	1/7	0	0	0	0
(Australia) 1956 Melbourne	5	1/7	0	0	0	0
(Italy) 1960 Rome	5	1/7	0	0	0	0
(Japan) 1964 Tokyo	0	0/7	0	0	0	0
1968 Mexico City	2	1/7	0	0	0	0
(West Germany) 1972 Munich	2	1/7	0	0	0	0
(Canada) 1976 Montreal	7	3/14	0	0	0	0
(Soviet Union) 1980 Moscow	10	3/14	0	0	0	0
(United States) 1984 Los Angeles	10	3/14	0	0	0	0
(South Korea) 1988 Seoul	10	4/14	0	0	0	0
(Spain) 1992 Barcelona	8	2/14	0	0	0	0
(United States) 1996 Atlanta	6	2/14	0	0	0	0
(Australia) 2000 Sydney	1	1/14	0	0	0	0
(Greece) 2004 Athens	4	3/14	0	0	0	0
(China) 2008 Beijing	6	4/14	0	0	0	0
(United Kingdom) 2012 London	4	3/14	0	0	0	0
(Brazil) 2016 Rio de Janeiro	4	2/14	0	0	0	0
(Japan) 2020 Tokyo	1	1/14	0	0	0	0
(France) 2024 Paris	2	2/14	0	0	0	0
Total			0	0	0	0

Event	No. of appearances	First appearance	First medal	First gold medal	Gold	Silver	Bronze	Total	Best finish
Men's single sculls	9/29	1936	—N/a	—N/a	0	0	0	0	12th (1980, 2020)
Women's single sculls	4/13	2004	—N/a	—N/a	0	0	0	0	14th (2004)
Men's lightweight double sculls	3/8	2004	—N/a	—N/a	0	0	0	0	13th (2004)
Women's lightweight double sculls	3/8	2008	—N/a	—N/a	0	0	0	0	13th (2012)
Men's double sculls	6/26	1924	—N/a	—N/a	0	0	0	0	4th (1924)
Women's double sculls	0/13	—N/a	—N/a	—N/a	0	0	0	0	—N/a
Men's quadruple sculls	2/13	1980	—N/a	—N/a	0	0	0	0	11th (1980)
Women's quadruple sculls	0/13	—N/a	—N/a	—N/a	0	0	0	0	—N/a
Men's coxless pair	7/26	1936	—N/a	—N/a	0	0	0	0	8th (1980, 1984)
Women's coxless pair	0/13	—N/a	—N/a	—N/a	0	0	0	0	—N/a
Men's coxless four	0/25	—N/a	—N/a	—N/a	0	0	0	0	—N/a
Women's coxless four	0/3	—N/a	—N/a	—N/a	0	0	0	0	—N/a
Men's lightweight coxless four	0/6	—N/a	—N/a	—N/a	0	0	0	0	—N/a
Men's coxed pair	7/18	1932	—N/a	—N/a	0	0	0	0	4th (1932, 1984)
Men's coxed four	8/20	1920	—N/a	—N/a	0	0	0	0	7th (1984)
Women's coxed four	0/4	—N/a	—N/a	—N/a	0	0	0	0	—N/a
Men's eight	2/28	1932	—N/a	—N/a	0	0	0	0	R1 (1932, 1936)
Women's eight	0/13	—N/a	—N/a	—N/a	0	0	0	0	—N/a

=== Rugby sevens ===
Games	Athletes	Events	Gold	Silver	Bronze	Total
(Brazil) 2016 Rio de Janeiro	24	2/2	0	0	0	0
(Japan) 2020 Tokyo	12	1/2	0	0	0	0
(France) 2024 Paris	12	1/2	0	0	0	0
Total			0	0	0	0

Event	No. of appearances	First appearance	First medal	First gold medal	Gold	Silver	Bronze	Total	Best finish
Men's tournament	1/3	2016	—N/a	—N/a	0	0	0	0	12th (2016)
Women's tournament	3/3	2016	—N/a	—N/a	0	0	0	0	9th (2016)

=== Rugby union ===
Games	Athletes	Events	Gold	Silver	Bronze	Total
(France) 1900 Paris	0	0/1	0	0	0	0
(United Kingdom) 1908 London	0	0/1	0	0	0	0
(Belgium) 1920 Antwerp	0	0/1	0	0	0	0
(France) 1924 Paris	0	0/1	0	0	0	0
Total			0	0	0	0

Event	No. of appearances	First appearance	First medal	First gold medal	Gold	Silver	Bronze	Total	Best finish
Men's tournament	0/4	—N/a	—N/a	—N/a	0	0	0	0	—N/a

=== Sailing ===
Games	Athletes	Events	Gold	Silver	Bronze	Total	Ranking
(France) 1900 Paris	0	0/13	0	0	0	0	
(United Kingdom) 1908 London	0	0/4	0	0	0	0	
(Sweden) 1912 Stockholm	0	0/4	0	0	0	0	
(Belgium) 1920 Antwerp	0	0/14	0	0	0	0	
(France) 1924 Paris	0	0/3	0	0	0	0	
(Netherlands) 1928 Amsterdam	0	0/3	0	0	0	0	
(United States) 1932 Los Angeles	0	0/4	0	0	0	0	
(Nazi Germany) 1936 Berlin	1	1/4	0	0	0	0	
(United Kingdom) 1948 London	7	3/5	0	0	0	0	
(Finland) 1952 Helsinki	6	3/5	0	0	0	0	
(Australia) 1956 Melbourne	3	2/5	0	0	0	0	
(Italy) 1960 Rome	5	3/5	0	0	0	0	
(Japan) 1964 Tokyo	5	3/5	0	0	0	0	
1968 Mexico City	5	3/5	0	0	1	1	11
(West Germany) 1972 Munich	10	5/6	0	0	0	0	
(Canada) 1976 Montreal	8	4/6	0	0	1	1	10
(Soviet Union) 1980 Moscow	12	6/6	2	0	0	2	1
(United States) 1984 Los Angeles	12	6/7	0	1	0	1	6
(South Korea) 1988 Seoul	16	8/8	0	0	2	2	13
(Spain) 1992 Barcelona	17	10/10	0	0	0	0	
(United States) 1996 Atlanta	14	9/10	2	0	1	3	1
(Australia) 2000 Sydney	12	8/11	0	1	1	2	10
(Greece) 2004 Athens	14	9/11	2	0	0	2	2
(China) 2008 Beijing	12	8/11	0	1	1	2	10
(United Kingdom) 2012 London	9	7/10	0	0	1	1	12
(Brazil) 2016 Rio de Janeiro	15	10/10	1	0	0	1	7
(Japan) 2020 Tokyo	13	8/10	1	0	0	1	5
(France) 2024 Paris	12	8/10	0	0	0	0	
Total			8	3	8	19	11

Event	No. of appearances	First appearance	First medal	First gold medal	Gold	Silver	Bronze	Total	Best finish
0-½ ton	0/2	—N/a	—N/a	—N/a	0	0	0	0	—N/a
½-1 ton	0/2	—N/a	—N/a	—N/a	0	0	0	0	—N/a
1-2 ton	0/2	—N/a	—N/a	—N/a	0	0	0	0	—N/a
2-3 ton	0/2	—N/a	—N/a	—N/a	0	0	0	0	—N/a
3-10 ton	0/2	—N/a	—N/a	—N/a	0	0	0	0	—N/a
10-20 ton	0/1	—N/a	—N/a	—N/a	0	0	0	0	—N/a
20+ ton	0/1	—N/a	—N/a	—N/a	0	0	0	0	—N/a
Open class	0/1	—N/a	—N/a	—N/a	0	0	0	0	—N/a
6 Metre	0/11	—N/a	—N/a	—N/a	0	0	0	0	—N/a
6.5 Metre	0/1	—N/a	—N/a	—N/a	0	0	0	0	—N/a
7 Metre	0/2	—N/a	—N/a	—N/a	0	0	0	0	—N/a
8 Metre	0/8	—N/a	—N/a	—N/a	0	0	0	0	—N/a
10 Metre	0/3	—N/a	—N/a	—N/a	0	0	0	0	—N/a
12 Metre	0/4	—N/a	—N/a	—N/a	0	0	0	0	—N/a
12 foot dinghy	0/2	—N/a	—N/a	—N/a	0	0	0	0	—N/a
18 foot dinghy	0/1	—N/a	—N/a	—N/a	0	0	0	0	—N/a
30m^{2} class	0/1	—N/a	—N/a	—N/a	0	0	0	0	—N/a
40m^{2} class	0/1	—N/a	—N/a	—N/a	0	0	0	0	—N/a
French National Monotype 1924	0/1	—N/a	—N/a	—N/a	0	0	0	0	—N/a
Snowbird	0/1	—N/a	—N/a	—N/a	0	0	0	0	—N/a
O-Jolle	1/1	1936	—N/a	—N/a	0	0	0	0	24th (1936)
Firefly	1/1	1948	—N/a	—N/a	0	0	0	0	11th (1948)
Swallow	1/1	1948	—N/a	—N/a	0	0	0	0	10th (1948)
Star	15/18	1948	1988	1996	2	1	3	6	(gold) (1996, 2004)
Dragon	1/7	1952	—N/a	—N/a	0	0	0	0	7th (1952)
Finn	18/18	1952	—N/a	—N/a	0	0	0	0	4th (1976, 1980, 2016)
5.5 Metre	0/5	—N/a	—N/a	—N/a	0	0	0	0	—N/a
12m² Sharpie	1/1	1956	—N/a	—N/a	0	0	0	0	10th (1956)
Flying Dutchman	9/9	1960	1968	—N/a	0	0	2	2	(bronze) (1968, 1976)
Tempest	1/2	1972	—N/a	—N/a	0	0	0	0	7th (1972)
Soling	7/8	1972	1984	—N/a	0	1	0	1	(silver) (1984)
Men's 470	11/12	1976	1980	1980	1	0	0	1	(gold) (1980)
Tornado	7/9	1980	1980	1980	1	0	2	3	(gold) (1980)
Windglider	0/1	—N/a	—N/a	—N/a	0	0	0	0	—N/a
Division II	1/1	1988	—N/a	—N/a	0	0	0	0	16th (1988)
Women's 470	8/9	1988	2008	—N/a	0	0	1	1	(bronze) (2008)
Men's Lechner A-390	1/1	1992	—N/a	—N/a	0	0	0	0	19th (1992)
Women's Lechner A-390	1/1	1992	—N/a	—N/a	0	0	0	0	17th (1992)
Europe	2/4	1992	—N/a	—N/a	0	0	0	0	14th (1992)
Men's Mistral One Design	3/3	1996	—N/a	—N/a	0	0	0	0	4th (2004)
Women's Mistral One Design	3/3	1996	—N/a	—N/a	0	0	0	0	25th (2004)
Laser	8/8	1996	1996	1996	2	1	0	3	(gold) (1996, 2004)
49er	5/7	2004	—N/a	—N/a	0	0	0	0	6th (2004)
Yngling	0/2	—N/a	—N/a	—N/a	0	0	0	0	—N/a
Men's RS:X	3/4	2008	—N/a	—N/a	0	0	0	0	5th (2008)
Women's RS:X	4/4	2008	—N/a	—N/a	0	0	0	0	8th (2016)
Laser Radial	3/5	2012	—N/a	—N/a	0	0	0	0	24th (2016)
Elliott 6m	0/1	—N/a	—N/a	—N/a	0	0	0	0	—N/a
49er FX	3/3	2016	2016	2016	2	0	0	2	(gold) (2016, 2020)
Nacra 17	3/3	2016	—N/a	—N/a	0	0	0	0	10th (2016, 2020, 2024)
Mixed 470	1/1	2024	—N/a	—N/a	0	0	0	0	10th (2024)
Men's IQFoil	1/1	2024	—N/a	—N/a	0	0	0	0	16th (2024)
Women's IQFoil	0/1	2024	—N/a	—N/a	0	0	0	0	—N/a
Men's Formula Kite	1/1	2024	—N/a	—N/a	0	0	0	0	SF (2024)
Women's Formula Kite	0/1	2024	—N/a	—N/a	0	0	0	0	—N/a

=== Shooting ===
Games	Athletes	Events	Gold	Silver	Bronze	Total
(Kingdom of Greece) 1896 Athens	0	0/5	0	0	0	0
(France) 1900 Paris	0	0/9	0	0	0	0
(Sweden) 1912 Stockholm	0	0/6	0	0	0	0
(United Kingdom) 1908 London	0	0/15	0	0	0	0
(Belgium) 1920 Antwerp	5	4/21	1	1	1	3
(France) 1924 Paris	1	1/10	0	0	0	0
(United States) 1932 Los Angeles	6	2/2	0	0	0	0
(Nazi Germany) 1936 Berlin	4	2/3	0	0	0	0
(United Kingdom) 1948 London	7	3/4	0	0	0	0
(Finland) 1952 Helsinki	8	5/7	0	0	0	0
(Australia) 1956 Melbourne	4	3/7	0	0	0	0
(Italy) 1960 Rome	3	4/6	0	0	0	0
(Japan) 1964 Tokyo	0	0/6	0	0	0	0
1968 Mexico City	2	3/7	0	0	0	0
(West Germany) 1972 Munich	4	2/8	0	0	0	0
(Canada) 1976 Montreal	8	5/7	0	0	0	0
(Soviet Union) 1980 Moscow	5	4/7	0	0	0	0
(United States) 1984 Los Angeles	8	6/11	0	0	0	0
(South Korea) 1988 Seoul	4	4/13	0	0	0	0
(Spain) 1992 Barcelona	2	4/13	0	0	0	0
(United States) 1996 Atlanta	1	1/15	0	0	0	0
(Australia) 2000 Sydney	1	1/17	0	0	0	0
(Greece) 2004 Athens	1	1/17	0	0	0	0
(China) 2008 Beijing	2	3/15	0	0	0	0
(United Kingdom) 2012 London	2	3/15	0	0	0	0
(Brazil) 2016 Rio de Janeiro	9	11/15	0	1	0	1
(Japan) 2020 Tokyo	1	1/15	0	0	0	0
(France) 2024 Paris	3	4/15	0	0	0	0
Total			1	2	1	4

Event	No. of appearances	First appearance	First medal	First gold medal	Gold	Silver	Bronze	Total	Best finish
Men's 10 metre air pistol	5/10	1992	2016	—N/a	0	1	0	1	(silver) (2016)
Women's 10 metre air pistol	3/10	1988	—N/a	—N/a	0	0	0	0	27th (1988)
Mixed team 10 metre air pistol	0/2	—N/a	—N/a	—N/a	0	0	0	0	—N/a
Men's 25 metre rapid fire pistol	11/26	1932	—N/a	—N/a	0	0	0	0	4th (1984)
Women's 25 metre pistol	4/11	1984	—N/a	—N/a	0	0	0	0	7th (1984)
Men's 30 metre military pistol	1/1	1920	1920	1920	1	0	0	1	(gold) (1920)
Men's 30 metre team military pistol	1/2	1920	—N/a	—N/a	0	0	0	0	4th (1920)
Men's 50 metre pistol	13/24	1920	1920	—N/a	0	1	0	1	(silver) (1920)
Men's 50 metre team free pistol	1/4	1920	1920	—N/a	0	0	1	1	(bronze) (1920)
Men's 10 metre air rifle	1/11	1984	—N/a	—N/a	0	0	0	0	45th (1984)
Women's 10 metre air rifle	2/11	2016	—N/a	—N/a	0	0	0	0	38th (2024)
Mixed team 10 metre air rifle	0/2	—N/a	—N/a	—N/a	0	0	0	0	—N/a
Men's 50 metre rifle, prone	12/23	1924	—N/a	—N/a	0	0	0	0	5th (1936)
Men's 50 metre free rifle, three positions	5/19	1952	—N/a	—N/a	0	0	0	0	27th (1952)
Women's 50 metre free rifle, three positions	1/11	2016	—N/a	—N/a	0	0	0	0	22nd (2024)
Men's 300 metre free rifle, three positions	1/11	1952	—N/a	—N/a	0	0	0	0	27th (1952)
Men's trap	8/24	1972	—N/a	—N/a	0	0	0	0	8th (1972)
Women's trap	1/7	2016	—N/a	—N/a	0	0	0	0	21st (2016)
Men's double trap	1/6	2012	—N/a	—N/a	0	0	0	0	17th (2012)
Mixed trap team	0/1	—N/a	—N/a	—N/a	0	0	0	0	—N/a
Men's skeet	2/15	1976	—N/a	—N/a	0	0	0	0	22nd (1976, 2016)
Women's skeet	2/7	2016	—N/a	—N/a	0	0	0	0	21st (2016)
Mixed skeet team	0/1	—N/a	—N/a	—N/a	0	0	0	0	—N/a

=== Skateboarding ===
Games	Athletes	Events	Gold	Silver	Bronze	Total	Ranking
(Japan) 2020 Tokyo	12	4/4	0	3	0	3	3
(France) 2024 Paris	12	4/4	0	0	2	2	4
Total			0	3	2	5	3

Event	No. of appearances	First appearance	First medal	First gold medal	Gold	Silver	Bronze	Total	Best finish
Men's park	2/2	2020	2020	—N/a	0	1	1	2	(silver) (2020)
Women's park	2/2	2020	—N/a	—N/a	0	0	0	0	4th (2024)
Men's street	2/2	2020	2020	—N/a	0	1	0	1	(silver) (2020)
Women's street	2/2	2020	2020	—N/a	0	1	1	2	(silver) (2020)

=== Skeleton ===
Games	Athletes	Events	Gold	Silver	Bronze	Total
(Switzerland) 1928 St. Moritz	0	0/1	0	0	0	0
(Switzerland) 1948 St. Moritz	0	0/1	0	0	0	0
(United States) 2002 Salt Lake City	0	0/2	0	0	0	0
(Italy) 2006 Turin	0	0/2	0	0	0	0
(Canada) 2010 Vancouver	0	0/2	0	0	0	0
(Russia) 2014 Sochi	0	0/2	0	0	0	0
(South Korea) 2018 Pyeongchang	0	0/2	0	0	0	0
(China) 2022 Beijing	1	1/2	0	0	0	0
(Italy) 2026 Milano Cortina	1	1/2	0	0	0	0
Total			0	0	0	0

Event	No. of appearances	First appearance	First medal	First gold medal	Gold	Silver	Bronze	Total	Best finish
Men's individual	0/8	—N/a	—N/a	—N/a	0	0	0	0	—N/a
Women's individual	2/7	2022	—N/a	—N/a	0	0	0	0	11th (2026)

=== Snowboarding ===
Games	Athletes	Events	Gold	Silver	Bronze	Total
(Japan) 1998 Nagano	0	0/4	0	0	0	0
(United States) 2002 Salt Lake City	0	0/4	0	0	0	0
(Italy) 2006 Milan	1	1/6	0	0	0	0
(Canada) 2010 Vancouver	1	1/6	0	0	0	0
(Russia) 2014 Sochi	1	1/10	0	0	0	0
(South Korea) 2018 Pyeongchang	1	1/10	0	0	0	0
(China) 2022 Beijing	0	0/11	0	0	0	0
(Italy) 2026 Milano Cortina	2	1/11	0	0	0	0
Total			0	0	0	0

Event	No. of appearances	First appearance	First medal	First gold medal	Gold	Silver	Bronze	Total	Best finish
Men's parallel giant slalom	0/8	—N/a	—N/a	—N/a	0	0	0	0	—N/a
Women's parallel giant slalom	0/8	—N/a	—N/a	—N/a	0	0	0	0	—N/a
Men's snowboard cross	0/6	—N/a	—N/a	—N/a	0	0	0	0	—N/a
Women's snowboard cross	4/6	—N/a	—N/a	—N/a	0	0	0	0	9th (2006)
Mixed team snowboard cross	0/2	—N/a	—N/a	—N/a	0	0	0	0	—N/a
Men's half-pipe	1/9	—N/a	—N/a	—N/a	0	0	0	0	14th (2026)
Women's half-pipe	0/8	—N/a	—N/a	—N/a	0	0	0	0	—N/a
Men's slopestyle	0/4	—N/a	—N/a	—N/a	0	0	0	0	—N/a
Women's slopestyle	0/4	—N/a	—N/a	—N/a	0	0	0	0	—N/a
Men's big air	0/3	—N/a	—N/a	—N/a	0	0	0	0	—N/a
Women's big air	0/3	—N/a	—N/a	—N/a	0	0	0	0	—N/a

=== Softball ===
Games	Athletes	Events	Gold	Silver	Bronze	Total
(United States) 1996 Atlanta	0	0/1	0	0	0	0
(Australia) 2000 Sydney	0	0/1	0	0	0	0
(Greece) 2004 Athens	0	0/1	0	0	0	0
(China) 2008 Beijing	0	0/1	0	0	0	0
(Japan) 2020 Tokyo	0	0/1	0	0	0	0
Total			0	0	0	0

Event	No. of appearances	First appearance	First medal	First gold medal	Gold	Silver	Bronze	Total	Best finish
Women's tournament	0/5	—N/a	—N/a	—N/a	0	0	0	0	—N/a

=== Sport climbing ===
Games	Athletes	Events	Gold	Silver	Bronze	Total
(Japan) 2020 Tokyo	0	0/2	0	0	0	0
(France) 2024 Paris	0	0/4	0	0	0	0
Total			0	0	0	0

Event	No. of appearances	First appearance	First medal	First gold medal	Gold	Silver	Bronze	Total	Best finish
Men's combined	0/2	—N/a	—N/a	—N/a	0	0	0	0	—N/a
Women's combined	0/2	—N/a	—N/a	—N/a	0	0	0	0	—N/a
Men's speed	0/1	—N/a	—N/a	—N/a	0	0	0	0	—N/a
Women's speed	0/1	—N/a	—N/a	—N/a	0	0	0	0	—N/a

=== Surfing ===
Games	Athletes	Events	Gold	Silver	Bronze	Total
(Japan) 2020 Tokyo	4	2/2	1	0	0	1
(France) 2024 Paris	6	2/2	0	1	1	2
Total			1	1	1	3

Event	No. of appearances	First appearance	First medal	First gold medal	Gold	Silver	Bronze	Total	Best finish
Men's shortboard	2/2	2020	2020	2020	1	0	1	2	(gold) (2020)
Women's shortboard	2/2	2020	2024	—N/a	0	1	0	1	(silver) (2024)

=== Swimming ===
Games	Athletes	Events	Gold	Silver	Bronze	Total
(Kingdom of Greece) 1896 Athens	0	0/4	0	0	0	0
(France) 1920 Paris	0	0/7	0	0	0	0
(United States) 1904 St. Louis	0	0/9	0	0	0	0
(United Kingdom) 1908 London	0	0/9	0	0	0	0
(Sweden) 1912 Stockholm	0	0/9	0	0	0	0
(Belgium) 1920 Antwerp	2	1/10	0	0	0	0
(France) 1924 Paris	0	0/11	0	0	0	0
(Netherlands) 1928 Amsterdam	0	0/11	0	0	0	0
(United States) 1932 Los Angeles	8	7/11	0	0	0	0
(Nazi Germany) 1936 Berlin	16	10/11	0	0	0	0
(United Kingdom) 1948 London	13	9/11	0	0	0	0
(Finland) 1952 Helsinki	12	8/11	0	0	1	1
(Australia) 1956 Melbourne	4	4/13	0	0	0	0
(Italy) 1960 Rome	5	5/15	0	0	1	1
(Japan) 1964 Tokyo	4	3/18	0	0	0	0
(Mexico) 1968 México City	4	6/29	0	0	0	0
(West Germany) 1972 Munich	12	21/29	0	0	0	0
(Canada) 1976 Montreal	9	14/26	0	0	0	0
(Soviet Union) 1980 Moscow	9	11/26	0	0	1	1
(United States) 1984 Los Angeles	7	13/29	0	1	0	1
(South Korea) 1988 Seoul	15	22/31	0	0	0	0
(Spain) 1992 Barcelona	9	11/31	0	1	0	1
(United States) 1996 Atlanta	10	12/32	0	1	2	3
(Australia) 2000 Sydney	13	13/32	0	0	1	1
(Greece) 2004 Athens	23	23/32	0	0	0	0
(China) 2008 Beijing	25	29/34	1	0	1	2
(United Kingdom) 2012 London	19	20/34	0	1	1	2
(Brazil) 2016 Rio de Janeiro	36	29/34	0	0	1	1
(Japan) 2020 Tokyo	27	22/37	1	0	2	3
(France) 2024 Paris	20	18/37	0	0	0	0
Total			2	4	11	17

Event	No. of appearances	First appearance	First medal	First gold medal	Gold	Silver	Bronze	Total	Best finish
Men's 50 metre freestyle	10/11	1988	1996	2008	1	0	3	4	(gold) (2008)
Women's 50 metre freestyle	6/10	1988	—N/a	—N/a	0	0	0	0	8th (2004, 2016)
Men's 100 metre freestyle	23/29	1920	1960	—N/a	0	1	3	4	(silver) (1992)
Women's 100 metre freestyle	11/26	1932	—N/a	—N/a	0	0	0	0	9th (1936)
Men's 200 metre freestyle	12/17	1972	1996	—N/a	0	1	1	2	(silver) (1996)
Women's 200 metre freestyle	6/15	1972	—N/a	—N/a	0	0	0	0	11th (2024)
Men's 400 metre freestyle	14/28	1936	—N/a	—N/a	0	0	0	0	4th (1976, 1980)
Women's 400 metre freestyle	8/25	1936	—N/a	—N/a	0	0	0	0	5th (1936)
Men's 800 metre freestyle	2/3	2020	—N/a	—N/a	0	0	0	0	8th (2020)
Women's 800 metre freestyle	4/15	1976	—N/a	—N/a	0	0	0	0	10th (2024)
Men's 1500 metre freestyle	10/28	1948	1952	—N/a	0	0	1	1	(bronze) (1952)
Women's 1500 metre freestyle	2/2	2020	—N/a	—N/a	0	0	0	0	7th (2024)
Men's 100 metre backstroke	18/27	1932	—N/a	—N/a	0	0	0	0	9th (1948)
Women's 100 metre backstroke	9/24	1932	—N/a	—N/a	0	0	0	0	12th (1932)
Men's 200 metre backstroke	11/17	1972	—N/a	—N/a	0	0	0	0	4th (1984)
Women's 200 metre backstroke	0/15	—N/a	—N/a	—N/a	0	0	0	0	—N/a
Men's 100 metre breaststroke	12/15	1968	—N/a	—N/a	0	0	0	0	4th (1968)
Women's 100 metre breaststroke	3/15	1972	—N/a	—N/a	0	0	0	0	27th (1976)
Men's 200 metre breaststroke	16/27	1932	—N/a	—N/a	0	0	0	0	6th (1948)
Women's 200 metre breaststroke	5/24	1932	—N/a	—N/a	0	0	0	0	11th (1932)
Men's 100 metre butterfly	13/15	1968	—N/a	—N/a	0	0	0	0	6th (2004)
Women's 100 metre butterfly	7/18	1972	—N/a	—N/a	0	0	0	0	7th (2008)
Men's 200 metre butterfly	11/18	1960	—N/a	—N/a	0	0	0	0	6th (2020)
Women's 200 metre butterfly	4/15	1976	—N/a	—N/a	0	0	0	0	22nd (2008)
Men's 200 metre individual medley	9/13	1972	—N/a	—N/a	0	0	0	0	4th (2008, 2012)
Women's 200 metre individual medley	6/13	1972	—N/a	—N/a	0	0	0	0	11th (2004)
Men's 400 metre individual medley	9/16	1972	1984	—N/a	0	2	0	2	(silver) (1984, 2012)
Women's 400 metre individual medley	5/16	1972	—N/a	—N/a	0	0	0	0	5th (2004)
Men's 4 × 100 metre freestyle relay	12/14	1972	2000	—N/a	0	0	1	1	(bronze) (2000)
Women's 4 × 100 metre freestyle relay	7/26	1948	—N/a	—N/a	0	0	0	0	6th (1948)
Men's 4 × 200 metre freestyle relay	16/27	1932	1980	—N/a	0	0	1	1	(bronze) (1980)
Women's 4 × 200 metre freestyle relay	4/8	2004	—N/a	—N/a	0	0	0	0	7th (2004, 2024)
Men's 4 × 100 metre medley relay	13/17	1960	—N/a	—N/a	0	0	0	0	5th (1972)
Women's 4 × 100 metre medley relay	2/17	2008	—N/a	—N/a	0	0	0	0	10th (2008)
Mixed 4 × 100 metre medley relay	2/2	2020	—N/a	—N/a	0	0	0	0	14th (2020)
Men's marathon 10 kilometre	3/5	2008	—N/a	—N/a	0	0	0	0	14th (2008)
Women's marathon 10 kilometre	5/5	2008	2016	2020	1	0	1	2	(gold) (2020)

=== Table tennis ===
Games	Athletes	Events	Gold	Silver	Bronze	Total
(South Korea) 1988 Seoul	2	2/4	0	0	0	0
(Spain) 1992 Barcelona	4	4/4	0	0	0	0
(United States) 1996 Atlanta	4	4/4	0	0	0	0
(Australia) 2000 Sydney	3	3/4	0	0	0	0
(Greece) 2004 Athens	5	4/4	0	0	0	0
(China) 2008 Beijing	4	3/4	0	0	0	0
(United Kingdom) 2012 London	6	4/4	0	0	0	0
(Brazil) 2016 Rio de Janeiro	6	4/4	0	0	0	0
(Japan) 2020 Tokyo	6	4/4	0	0	0	0
(France) 2024 Paris	6	5/5	0	0	0	0
Total			0	0	0	0

Event	No. of appearances	First appearance	First medal	First gold medal	Gold	Silver	Bronze	Total	Best finish
Men's singles	10/10	1988	—N/a	—N/a	0	0	0	0	4th (2024)
Men's doubles	5/5	1988	—N/a	—N/a	0	0	0	0	1R (2004)
Women's singles	9/10	1992	—N/a	—N/a	0	0	0	0	2R (2016, 2020, 2024)
Women's doubles	3/5	1992	—N/a	—N/a	0	0	0	0	2R (2004)
Mixed doubles	1/2	2024	—N/a	—N/a	0	0	0	0	R16 (2024)
Men's team	5/5	2008	—N/a	—N/a	0	0	0	0	QF (2020, 2024)
Women's team	4/5	2012	—N/a	—N/a	0	0	0	0	R16 (2012, 2016, 2020, 2024)

=== Taekwondo ===
Games	Athletes	Events	Gold	Silver	Bronze	Total
(Australia) 2000 Sydney	1	1/8	0	0	0	0
(Greece) 2004 Athens	3	3/8	0	0	0	0
(China) 2008 Beijing	3	3/8	0	0	1	1
(United Kingdom) 2012 London	2	2/8	0	0	0	0
(Brazil) 2016 Rio de Janeiro	4	4/8	0	0	1	1
(Japan) 2020 Tokyo	3	3/8	0	0	0	0
(France) 2024 Paris	4	4/8	0	0	1	1
Total			0	0	3	3

Event	No. of appearances	First appearance	First medal	First gold medal	Gold	Silver	Bronze	Total	Best finish
Men's Flyweight	3/7	2004	—N/a	—N/a	0	0	0	0	QF (2008, 2016)
Women's Flyweight	1/7	2016	—N/a	—N/a	0	0	0	0	QF (2016)
Men's Featherweight	4/7	2004	2024	—N/a	0	0	1	1	(bronze) (2024)
Women's Featherweight	4/7	2000	—N/a	—N/a	0	0	0	0	QF (2008, 2024)
Men's Middleweight	2/7	2020	—N/a	—N/a	0	0	0	0	QF (2024)
Women's Middleweight	2/7	2020	—N/a	—N/a	0	0	0	0	5th (2020)
Men's Heavyweight	1/7	2016	2016	—N/a	0	0	1	1	(bronze) (2016)
Women's Heavyweight	3/7	2004	2008	—N/a	0	0	1	1	(bronze) (2008)

=== Tennis ===
Games	Athletes	Events	Gold	Silver	Bronze	Total
(Kingdom of Greece) 1896 Athens	0	0/2	0	0	0	0
(France) 1900 Paris	0	0/4	0	0	0	0
(United States) 1904 St. Louis	0	0/2	0	0	0	0
(United Kingdom) 1908 London	0	0/6	0	0	0	0
(Sweden) 1912 Stockholm	3	0/8	0	0	0	0
(Belgium) 1920 Antwerp	0	0/5	0	0	0	0
(France) 1924 Paris	0	0/5	0	0	0	0
(South Korea) 1988 Seoul	3	3/4	0	0	0	0
(Spain) 1992 Barcelona	4	4/4	0	0	0	0
(United States) 1996 Atlanta	3	2/4	0	0	0	0
(Australia) 2000 Sydney	4	3/4	0	0	0	0
(Greece) 2004 Athens	3	2/4	0	0	0	0
(China) 2008 Beijing	4	2/4	0	0	0	0
(United Kingdom) 2012 London	4	2/5	0	0	0	0
(Brazil) 2016 Rio de Janeiro	7	5/5	0	0	0	0
(Japan) 2020 Tokyo	6	4/5	0	0	1	1
(France) 2024 Paris	5	5/5	0	0	0	0
Total			0	0	1	1

Event	No. of appearances	First appearance	First medal	First gold medal	Gold	Silver	Bronze	Total	Best finish
Men's singles	9/17	1988	—N/a	—N/a	0	0	0	0	4th (1996)
Men's doubles	8/17	1988	—N/a	—N/a	0	0	0	0	QF (2012, 2016)
Women's singles	4/15	1988	—N/a	—N/a	0	0	0	0	2R (1988, 2024)
Women's doubles	5/12	1992	2020	—N/a	0	0	1	1	(bronze) (2020)
Mixed doubles	2/8	2016	—N/a	—N/a	0	0	0	0	QF (2016)

=== Triathlon ===
Games	Athletes	Events	Gold	Silver	Bronze	Total
(Australia) 2000 Sydney	6	2/2	0	0	0	0
(Greece) 2004 Athens	6	2/2	0	0	0	0
(China) 2008 Beijing	3	2/2	0	0	0	0
(United Kingdom) 2012 London	3	2/2	0	0	0	0
(Brazil) 2016 Rio de Janeiro	2	2/2	0	0	0	0
(Japan) 2020 Tokyo	3	2/3	0	0	0	0
(France) 2024 Paris	4	3/3	0	0	0	0
Total			0	0	0	0

Event	No. of appearances	First appearance	First medal	First gold medal	Gold	Silver	Bronze	Total	Best finish
Men's individual	7/7	2000	—N/a	—N/a	0	0	0	0	10th (2024)
Women's individual	7/7	2000	—N/a	—N/a	0	0	0	0	10th (2000)
Mixed relay	1/2	2024	—N/a	—N/a	0	0	0	0	8th (2024)

=== Tug of war ===
Games	Athletes	Events	Gold	Silver	Bronze	Total
(France) 1900 Paris	0	0/1	0	0	0	0
(United States) 1904 St. Louis	0	0/1	0	0	0	0
(United Kingdom) 1908 London	0	0/1	0	0	0	0
(Sweden) 1912 Stockholm	0	0/1	0	0	0	0
(Belgium) 1920 Antwerp	0	0/1	0	0	0	0
Total			0	0	0	0

Event	No. of appearances	First appearance	First medal	First gold medal	Gold	Silver	Bronze	Total	Best finish
Men's tournament	0/5	—N/a	—N/a	—N/a	0	0	0	0	—N/a

=== Volleyball ===
Games	Athletes	Events	Gold	Silver	Bronze	Total	Ranking
(Japan) 1964 Tokyo	12	1/2	0	0	0	0	
1968 Mexico City	12	1/2	0	0	0	0	
(West Germany) 1972 Munich	12	1/2	0	0	0	0	
(Canada) 1976 Montreal	12	1/2	0	0	0	0	
(Soviet Union) 1980 Moscow	24	2/2	0	0	0	0	
(United States) 1984 Los Angeles	24	2/2	0	1	0	1	3
(South Korea) 1988 Seoul	24	2/2	0	0	0	0	
(Spain) 1992 Barcelona	24	2/2	1	0	0	1	1
(United States) 1996 Atlanta	32	4/4	1	1	1	3	1
(Australia) 2000 Sydney	32	4/4	0	2	2	4	5
(Greece) 2004 Athens	32	4/4	2	1	0	3	1
(China) 2008 Beijing	32	4/4	1	2	1	4	2
(United Kingdom) 2012 London	32	4/4	1	2	1	4	1
(Brazil) 2016 Rio de Janeiro	32	4/4	2	1	0	3	1
(Japan) 2020 Tokyo	32	4/4	0	1	0	1	5
(France) 2024 Paris	32	4/4	1	0	1	2	1
Total			9	11	6	26	2

Event	No. of appearances	First appearance	First medal	First gold medal	Gold	Silver	Bronze	Total	Best finish
Men's indoor tournament	16/16	1964	1984	1992	3	3	0	6	(gold) (1992, 2004, 2016)
Women's indoor tournament	12/16	1980	1996	2008	2	1	3	6	(gold) (2008, 2012)
Men's beach tournament	8/8	1996	2000	2004	2	3	1	6	(gold) (2004, 2016)
Women's beach tournament	8/8	1996	1996	1996	2	4	2	8	(gold) (1996, 2024)

=== Water motorsports ===
Games	Athletes	Events	Gold	Silver	Bronze	Total
(United Kingdom) 1908 London	0	0/3	0	0	0	0
Total			0	0	0	0

Event	No. of appearances	First appearance	First medal	First gold medal	Gold	Silver	Bronze	Total	Best finish
Class A (open)	0/1	—N/a	—N/a	—N/a	0	0	0	0	—N/a
Class B (<60 ft)	0/1	—N/a	—N/a	—N/a	0	0	0	0	—N/a
Class C (6.5–8 m)	0/1	—N/a	—N/a	—N/a	0	0	0	0	—N/a

=== Water polo ===
Games	Athletes	Events	Gold	Silver	Bronze	Total
(France) 1900 Paris	0	0/1	0	0	0	0
(United Kingdom) 1908 London	0	0/1	0	0	0	0
(Sweden) 1912 Stockholm	0	0/1	0	0	0	0
(Belgium) 1920 Antwerp	8	1/1	0	0	0	0
(France) 1924 Paris	0	0/1	0	0	0	0
(Netherlands) 1928 Amsterdam	0	0/1	0	0	0	0
(United States) 1932 Los Angeles	8	1/1	0	0	0	0
(Nazi Germany) 1936 Berlin	0	0/1	0	0	0	0
(United Kingdom) 1948 London	0	0/1	0	0	0	0
(Finland) 1952 Helsinki	11	1/1	0	0	0	0
(Australia) 1956 Melbourne	0	0/1	0	0	0	0
(Italy) 1960 Rome	9	1/1	0	0	0	0
(Japan) 1964 Tokyo	11	1/1	0	0	0	0
1968 Mexico City	10	1/1	0	0	0	0
(West Germany) 1972 Munich	0	0/1	0	0	0	0
(Canada) 1976 Montreal	0	0/1	0	0	0	0
(Soviet Union) 1980 Moscow	0	0/1	0	0	0	0
(South Korea) 1988 Seoul	0	0/1	0	0	0	0
(Spain) 1992 Barcelona	0	0/1	0	0	0	0
(United States) 1996 Atlanta	0	0/1	0	0	0	0
(Australia) 2000 Sydney	0	0/2	0	0	0	0
(Greece) 2004 Athens	0	0/2	0	0	0	0
(China) 2008 Beijing	0	0/2	0	0	0	0
(United Kingdom) 2012 London	0	0/2	0	0	0	0
(Brazil) 2016 Rio de Janeiro	26	2/2	0	0	0	0
(Japan) 2020 Tokyo	0	0/2	0	0	0	0
(France) 2024 Paris	0	0/2	0	0	0	0
Total			0	0	0	0

Event	No. of appearances	First appearance	First medal	First gold medal	Gold	Silver	Bronze	Total	Best finish
Men's tournament	8/29	1920	—N/a	—N/a	0	0	0	0	6th (1920)
Women's tournament	1/7	2016	—N/a	—N/a	0	0	0	0	8th (2016)

=== Weightlifting ===
Games	Athletes	Events	Gold	Silver	Bronze	Total
(Kingdom of Greece) 1896 Athens	0	0/2	0	0	0	0
(United States) 1904 St. Louis	0	0/2	0	0	0	0
(Belgium) 1920 Antwerp	0	0/5	0	0	0	0
(France) 1924 Paris	0	0/5	0	0	0	0
(Netherlands) 1928 Amsterdam	0	0/5	0	0	0	0
(United States) 1932 Los Angeles	0	0/5	0	0	0	0
(Nazi Germany) 1936 Berlin	0	0/5	0	0	0	0
(United Kingdom) 1948 London	0	0/6	0	0	0	0
(Finland) 1952 Helsinki	3	3/7	0	0	0	0
(Australia) 1956 Melbourne	2	2/7	0	0	0	0
(Italy) 1960 Rome	1	1/7	0	0	0	0
(Japan) 1964 Tokyo	0	0/7	0	0	0	0
1968 Mexico City	1	1/7	0	0	0	0
(West Germany) 1972 Munich	2	2/9	0	0	0	0
(Canada) 1976 Montreal	1	1/9	0	0	0	0
(Soviet Union) 1980 Moscow	2	2/10	0	0	0	0
(United States) 1984 Los Angeles	0	0/10	0	0	0	0
(South Korea) 1988 Seoul	2	2/10	0	0	0	0
(Spain) 1992 Barcelona	1	1/10	0	0	0	0
(United States) 1996 Atlanta	1	1/10	0	0	0	0
(Australia) 2000 Sydney	1	1/15	0	0	0	0
(Greece) 2004 Athens	0	0/15	0	0	0	0
(China) 2008 Beijing	1	1/15	0	0	0	0
(United Kingdom) 2012 London	2	2/15	0	0	0	0
(Brazil) 2016 Rio de Janeiro	5	5/15	0	0	0	0
(Japan) 2020 Tokyo	2	2/14	0	0	0	0
(France) 2024 Paris	2	2/10	0	0	0	0
Total			0	0	0	0

Event	No. of appearances	First appearance	First medal	First gold medal	Gold	Silver	Bronze	Total	Best finish
Men's Flyweight	1/7	1980	—N/a	—N/a	0	0	0	0	16th (1980)
Men's Bantamweight	1/20	1976	—N/a	—N/a	0	0	0	0	16th (1976)
Men's Featherweight	1/24	1980	—N/a	—N/a	0	0	0	0	DNF (1980)
Men's Lightweight	3/25	1956	—N/a	—N/a	0	0	0	0	14th (1956)
Men's Middleweight	1/24	1968	—N/a	—N/a	0	0	0	0	13th (1968)
Men's Light-heavyweight	3/24	1952	—N/a	—N/a	0	0	0	0	15th (1972)
Men's Middle-heavyweight	4/18	1952	—N/a	—N/a	0	0	0	0	12th (1956)
Men's First-heavyweight	2/5	1992	—N/a	—N/a	0	0	0	0	18th (1992)
Men's Heavyweight	2/25	1952	—N/a	—N/a	0	0	0	0	12th (1952)
Men's Super heavyweight	3/14	1972	—N/a	—N/a	0	0	0	0	5th (2016)
Women's Flyweight	2/7	2000	—N/a	—N/a	0	0	0	0	9th (2000, 2020)
Women's Featherweight	1/6	2016	—N/a	—N/a	0	0	0	0	5th (2016)
Women's Lightweight	0/7	—N/a	—N/a	—N/a	0	0	0	0	—N/a
Women's Light-heavyweight	1/7	2024	—N/a	—N/a	0	0	0	0	8th (2024)
Women's Heavyweight	4/7	2012	—N/a	—N/a	0	0	0	0	7th (2024)
Women's Super heavyweight	0/7	—N/a	—N/a	—N/a	0	0	0	0	—N/a

=== Wrestling ===
Games	Athletes	Events	Gold	Silver	Bronze	Total
(Kingdom of Greece) 1896 Athens	0	0/1	0	0	0	0
(United States) 1904 St. Louis	0	0/7	0	0	0	0
(United Kingdom) 1908 London	0	0/9	0	0	0	0
(Sweden) 1912 Stockholm	0	0/5	0	0	0	0
(Belgium) 1920 Antewerp	0	0/10	0	0	0	0
(France) 1924 Paris	0	0/13	0	0	0	0
(Netherlands) 1928 Amsterdam	0	0/13	0	0	0	0
(United States) 1932 Los Angeles	0	0/14	0	0	0	0
(Nazi Germany) 1936 Berlin	0	0/14	0	0	0	0
(United Kingdom) 1948 London	0	0/16	0	0	0	0
(Finland) 1952 Helsinki	0	0/16	0	0	0	0
(Australia) 1956 Melbourne	0	0/16	0	0	0	0
(Italy) 1960 Rome	0	0/16	0	0	0	0
(Japan) 1964 Tokyo	0	0/16	0	0	0	0
1968 Mexico City	0	0/16	0	0	0	0
(West Germany) 1972 Munich	0	0/20	0	0	0	0
(Canada) 1976 Montreal	0	0/20	0	0	0	0
(Soviet Union) 1980 Moscow	0	0/20	0	0	0	0
(United States) 1984 Los Angeles	0	0/20	0	0	0	0
(South Korea) 1988 Seoul	2	2/20	0	0	0	0
(Spain) 1992 Barcelona	1	1/20	0	0	0	0
(United States) 1996 Atlanta	0	0/16	0	0	0	0
(Greece) 2004 Athens	1	1/18	0	0	0	0
(China) 2008 Beijing	1	1/18	0	0	0	0
(United Kingdom) 2012 London	1	1/18	0	0	0	0
(Brazil) 2016 Rio de Janeiro	5	5/18	0	0	0	0
(Japan) 2020 Tokyo	3	3/18	0	0	0	0
(France) 2024 Paris	1	1/18	0	0	0	0
Total			0	0	0	0

Event	No. of appearances	First appearance	First medal	First gold medal	Gold	Silver	Bronze	Total	Best finish
Men's Greco-Roman light flyweight	0/7	—N/a	—N/a	—N/a	0	0	0	0	—N/a
Men's Greco-Roman flyweight	0/14	—N/a	—N/a	—N/a	0	0	0	0	—N/a
Men's Greco-Roman bantamweight	0/24	—N/a	—N/a	—N/a	0	0	0	0	—N/a
Men's Greco-Roman featherweight	0/23	—N/a	—N/a	—N/a	0	0	0	0	—N/a
Men's Greco-Roman lightweight	0/27	—N/a	—N/a	—N/a	0	0	0	0	—N/a
Men's Greco-Roman featherweight	0/23	—N/a	—N/a	—N/a	0	0	0	0	—N/a
Men's Greco-Roman welterweight	0/22	—N/a	—N/a	—N/a	0	0	0	0	—N/a
Men's Greco-Roman middleweight	0/27	—N/a	—N/a	—N/a	0	0	0	0	—N/a
Men's Greco-Roman light heavyweight	0/20	—N/a	—N/a	—N/a	0	0	0	0	—N/a
Men's Greco-Roman heavyweight	0/25	—N/a	—N/a	—N/a	0	0	0	0	—N/a
Men's Greco-Roman super heavyweight	2/14	2016	—N/a	—N/a	0	0	0	0	16th (2016)
Men's freestyle light flyweight	0/8	—N/a	—N/a	—N/a	0	0	0	0	—N/a
Men's freestyle flyweight	0/15	—N/a	—N/a	—N/a	0	0	0	0	—N/a
Women's freestyle flyweight	0/6	—N/a	—N/a	—N/a	0	0	0	0	—N/a
Men's freestyle bantamweight	0/26	—N/a	—N/a	—N/a	0	0	0	0	—N/a
Women's freestyle bantamweight	1/6	2012	—N/a	—N/a	0	0	0	0	12th (2012)
Men's freestyle featherweight	0/24	—N/a	—N/a	—N/a	0	0	0	0	—N/a
Men's freestyle lightweight	0/26	—N/a	—N/a	—N/a	0	0	0	0	—N/a
Men's freestyle welterweight	0/25	—N/a	—N/a	—N/a	0	0	0	0	—N/a
Women's freestyle welterweight	2/3	2016	—N/a	—N/a	0	0	0	0	5th (2024)
Men's freestyle middleweight	1/25	1992	—N/a	—N/a	0	0	0	0	R1 (1992)
Women's freestyle middleweight	2/6	2016	—N/a	—N/a	0	0	0	0	15th (2016)
Men's freestyle light heavyweight	1/18	1988	—N/a	—N/a	0	0	0	0	R1 (1988)
Women's freestyle light heavyweight	1/3	2016	—N/a	—N/a	0	0	0	0	10th (2016)
Men's freestyle heavyweight	2/26	1988	—N/a	—N/a	0	0	0	0	20th (2004)
Women's freestyle heavyweight	3/6	2008	—N/a	—N/a	0	0	0	0	9th (2016)
Men's freestyle super heavyweight	0/14	—N/a	—N/a	—N/a	0	0	0	0	—N/a

== See also ==
- Sports in Brazil
- 2016 Summer Olympics
- Brazil at the Youth Olympics
- Brazil at the Paralympics
- Tropical nations at the Winter Olympics
