= Brazil at the 1984 Summer Olympics =

- IOC code: BRA
- NOC: Brazilian Olympic Committee

in Los Angeles
- Competitors: 147 (126 men and 21 women) in 17 sports
- Flag bearer: Eduardo Ramos
- Medals Ranked 19th: Gold 1 Silver 5 Bronze 2 Total 8

Summer Olympics appearances (overview)
- 1920; 1924; 1928; 1932; 1936; 1948; 1952; 1956; 1960; 1964; 1968; 1972; 1976; 1980; 1984; 1988; 1992; 1996; 2000; 2004; 2008; 2012; 2016; 2020; 2024; 2028

Brazil competed at the 1984 Summer Olympics in Los Angeles, United States. 147 competitors, 126 men and 21 women, took part in 82 events in 17 sports. The country set a record with 8 medals – only surpassed in 1996 with 15, but only one medal was gold.

The runner Joaquim Cruz won the men's 800 metres event with an Olympic record. This was the first and until nowadays the only gold medal achieved by Brazilians in a track event in Athletics – all the other gold medals were in field events.

Brazilian football and volleyball men's teams started their success in Olympic history winning for the first time an Olympic medal. Both teams were silver medalists. The Olympic football team lost the final to France by 2 – 0. Brazil men's national volleyball team was defeated by host country United States by 3 sets to 0.

The swimmer Ricardo Prado was the silver medalist in the men's 400 metre individual medley. The sailor Torben Grael won the silver medal in the Soling class together with Daniel Adler and Ronaldo Senfft. It was the first Olympic medal won by Grael, whose five Olympic medals were a record for 40 years, when Rebeca Andrade won six.

Brazilian judokas won three Olympic medals in 1984. Douglas Vieira was a silver medalist in men's 95 kg category. Luis Onmura was a bronze medalist in men's 71 kg and Walter Carmona conquered bronze medal in men's 86 kg.

== Medalists ==
Medal	Name	Sport	Event	Date
Gold	Joaquim Cruz	Athletics	Men's 800 metres	August 6
Silver	Ricardo Prado	Swimming	Men's 400 metre individual medley	July 30
Silver	Daniel Adler; Torben Grael; Ronaldo Senfft	Sailing	Soling class	August 8
Silver	Douglas Vieira	Judo	Men's 95 kg	August 9
Silver	Men's Brazil Olympic football team: Ademir; Pinga; Davi; Milton Cruz; Luís Henrique Dias; André Luís; Mauro Galvão; Tonho; Kita; Gilmar Popoca; Silvinho; Gilmar; Paulo Santos; Ronaldo Silva; Luiz Carlos Winck; Dunga; Chicão	Football	Men's tournament	August 11
Silver	Brazil men's national volleyball team: Amauri Ribeiro; Antônio Carlos Gueiros Ribeiro; Bernard Rajzman; Bernardo Rezende; Domingos Maracanã; Fernando Ávila; Marcus Vinícius Freire; José Montanaro; Renan Dal Zotto; Rui Nascimento; William Silva; Xandó	Volleyball	Men's tournament	August 11
Bronze	Luis Onmura	Judo	Men's 71 kg	August 6
Bronze	Walter Carmona	Judo	Men's 86 kg	August 8

Medals by sport
Sport	1st place, gold medalist(s)	2nd place, silver medalist(s)	3rd place, bronze medalist(s)	Total
Athletics	1	0	0	1
Judo	0	1	2	3
Football	0	1	0	1
Sailing	0	1	0	1
Swimming	0	1	0	1
Volleyball	0	1	0	1
Total	1	5	2	8

Medals by gender
Gender	1st place, gold medalist(s)	2nd place, silver medalist(s)	3rd place, bronze medalist(s)	Total
Male	1	5	2	8
Female	0	0	0	0
Mixed	0	0	0	0
Total	1	5	2	8

== Archery ==
In its second Olympic archery competition, Brazil sent only one man. Veteran Renato Emilio fell drastically in the ranking despite having improved upon his score from 1980 by 99 points.

Men

Athlete	Event	Round 1		Round 2		Total score	
Athlete	Event	Score	Seed	Score	Seed	Score	Seed
Renato Emilio	Individual	1184	42	1179	42	2363	44

== Athletics ==
Men
Track & road events

Athlete	Event	Heat		Quarterfinal		Semifinal		Final	
Athlete	Event	Result	Rank	Result	Rank	Result	Rank	Result	Rank
José Luíz Barbosa	800 m	1:47.12	2 Q	1:46.87	4 Q	1:48.70	8	Did not advance	
Paulo Roberto Correia	100 m	10.45	4 q	10.54	7	Did not advance			
Joaquim Cruz	800 m	1:45.66	1 Q	1:44.84	1 Q	1:43.82	1 Q	1:43.00	Gold medal
Joaquim Cruz	1500 m	3:41.01	1 Q	—N/a		DNF		Did not advance	
Antônio Dias Ferreira	400 m hurdles	49.85	2 Q	—N/a		50.70	8	Did not advance	
Agberto Guimarães	800 m	1:47.72	3 Q	1:45.18	3 Q	1:46.65	6	Did not advance	
Agberto Guimarães	1500 m	3:49.26	2 Q	—N/a		DSQ		Did not advance	
Katsuhiko Nakaya	100 m	10.55	3 Q	10.69	5	Did not advance			
Wilson David Santos	400 m	47.55	5	Did not advance					
Nelson dos Santos	100 m	10.70	3 Q	10.53	4	Did not advance			
Eloi Schleder	Marathon	—N/a						2'16:35	23
Arnaldo da Silva	200 m	21.24	5	Did not advance					
João Batista da Silva	200 m	20.70	3 q	20.61	4 Q	20.61	2 Q	20.30	4
José João da Silva	5000 m	14:03.44	8	Did not advance					
José João da Silva	10000 m	29:10.52	10	Did not advance					
Robson da Silva	200 m	21.08	3 Q	20.88	4 Q	20.80	6	Did not advance	
Evaldo Rosa Silva	400 m	47.55	6	Did not advance					
Gerson Souza	400 m	47.02	3 Q	46.65	7	Did not advance			
Arnaldo da Silva; Robson Caetano; Katsuhiko Nakaya; Paulo Roberto Correia; Nelson dos Santos	4 × 100 m	39.27	2 q	—N/a		39.52	4 q	39.40	8
João Batista da Silva; Antônio Dias Ferreira; José Luíz Barbosa; Gerson Souza; Wilson David Santos	4 × 400 m	3:05.08	5 q	—N/a		3:03:99	5	Did not advance	

Field events

Athlete	Event	Qualification		Final	
Athlete	Event	Distance	Position	Distance	Position
Tom Hintnaus	Pole vault	5.35	8 q	NM	12
Abcélvio Rodrigues	Triple jump	16.12	16	Did not advance	

Women
Track & road events

Athlete	Event	Heat		Quarterfinal		Semifinal		Final	
Athlete	Event	Result	Rank	Result	Rank	Result	Rank	Result	Rank
Esmeralda de Jesus Garcia	100 m	11.63	4 q	11.82	6	Did not advance			
Eleonora Mendonça	Marathon	—N/a						2:52:19	44

Field events

Athlete	Event	Qualification		Final	
Athlete	Event	Distance	Position	Distance	Position
Conceição Geremias	Long jump	6.04	18	Did not advance	
Esmeralda de Jesus Garcia	Long jump	6.01	19	Did not advance	

Combined events – Heptathlon

Athlete	Event	100H	HJ	SP	200 m	LJ	JT	800 m	Final	Rank
Conceição Geremias	Result	13.98	1.74	13.15	25.00	5.65	NM	DNS	5508	DNF
Conceição Geremias	Points	868	974	789	846	828	0	DNS	5508	DNF

== Basketball ==
=== Men's team competition ===
==== Group A ====
Qualified for the quarterfinals

Team	W	L	PF	PA	PD	Pts
Yugoslavia	5	0	457	366	+91	10
Italy	4	1	437	363	+74	9
Australia	3	2	383	403	−20	8
West Germany	2	3	384	376	+8	7
Brazil	1	4	401	423	−22	6
Egypt	0	5	349	480	−131	5

July 29

Australia	76–72	Brazil
Scoring by half: 34–38, 42–34

The Forum, Inglewood, California

July 30

Brazil	91–82	Egypt
Scoring by half: 45–43, 46–39

The Forum, Inglewood, California

August 1

Italy	89–78	Brazil
Scoring by half: 43–44, 46–34

The Forum, Inglewood, California

August 2

Yugoslavia	98–85	Brazil
Scoring by half: 55–50, 43–35

The Forum, Inglewood, California

August 4

West Germany	78–75	Brazil
Scoring by half: 41–37, 37–38

The Forum, Inglewood, California

- Team Roster
  - Nilo Guimarães
  - Silvio Malvezi
  - Gerson Victalino
  - Milton Setrini Júnior
  - Ricardo Guimarães
  - Marcos Leite
  - Eduardo Galvão
  - Marcel Souza
  - Adilson Nascimento
  - Marcelo Vido
  - Oscar Schmidt
  - Israel Machado

== Cycling ==
Seven cyclists represented Brazil in 1984.

=== Road ===
Athlete	Event	Time	Rank
Gilson Alvaristo; Jair Braga; Renan Ferraro; Marcos Mazzaron	Team time trial	2:15:37	18

=== Track ===
1000m time trial

Athlete	Event	Time	Rank
Marcelo Greuel	1000m time trial	1:08.37	12

Men's Sprint

Athlete	Event	Round 1	Repechage 1	Repechage Finals	Round 2	Repechage 2	Round 3	Repechage 3	Quarterfinals	Semifinals	Final	
Athlete	Event	Time Speed (km/h)	Rank	Opposition Time Speed (km/h)	Opposition Time Speed (km/h)	Opposition Time Speed (km/h)	Opposition Time Speed (km/h)	Opposition Time Speed (km/h)	Opposition Time Speed (km/h)	Opposition Time Speed (km/h)	Opposition Time Speed (km/h)	Rank
Paulo Jamur	Sprint	Nakatake (JPN); Pile (BER); L	Samuel (TTO); Moodie (CAY); L	Lyn (ANT); Joseph (GUY); W 11,92	Gorski (USA); L	Steele (NZL); L	Did not advance					

Points race

Athlete	Event	Semifinal			Final		
Athlete	Event	Points	Laps behind	Rank	Points	Laps behind	Rank
Hans Fischer	Points race	5	2	14	Did not advance		

Pursuit

Athlete	Event	Qualification		Quarterfinals	Semifinals	Final	
Athlete	Event	Time	Rank	Opposition Time	Opposition Time	Opposition Time	Rank
Hans Fischer	Individual pursuit	5:00,47	22	Did not advance			

== Diving ==
Women

Athlete	Event	Preliminary		Final	
Athlete	Event	Points	Rank	Total	Rank
Ângela Ribeiro	3 m springboard	370.68	23	Did not advance	
Ângela Ribeiro	10 m platform	329.31	13	Did not advance	

== Equestrianism ==
=== Show jumping ===
Athlete	Horse	Event	Qualification		Final			
Athlete	Horse	Event	Penalties	Rank	Penalties	Rank	Penalties	Rank
Marcelo Blessman	Alpes	Individual	44.00	45	Did not advance			
Jorge Carneiro	Testarudo	Individual	21.25	32	Did not advance			
Caio Sérgio de Carvalho	Virtuoso	Individual	23.25	33	Did not advance			
Jorge Carneiro; Marcelo Blessman; Caio Sérgio de Carvalho; Vitor Teixeira	See above	Team	66.50	12 Q	67.00	10	133.50	10

== Football ==
Brazil won the silver medal for men's football, their first ever. Even though Brazil has won more Soccer World Cups than any other country, they have never won a football gold medal at any olympics. The Brazilian team was entirely made by players of Sport Club Internacional, of Porto Alegre. Amongst them, was 1994 World Cup captain, Dunga.

=== Group C ===
Pos	Team	Pld	W	D	L	GF	GA	GD	Pts	Qualification
1	Brazil	3	3	0	0	6	1	+5	6	Qualified for quarter-finals
2	West Germany	3	2	0	1	8	1	+7	4	Qualified for quarter-finals
3	Morocco	3	1	0	2	1	4	−3	2	
4	Saudi Arabia	3	0	0	3	1	10	−9	0	

Source: FIFA
July 30, 1984
19:00

Brazil	3 – 1	Saudi Arabia
Gilmar Popoca 12'; Silvinho 50'; Dunga 59'	Report	Abdullah 69'

Rose Bowl, Pasadena
Attendance: 40.799
Referee: McGinlay (GBR)

August 1, 1984
19:00

Brazil	1 – 0	West Germany
Gilmar Popoca 86'	Report

Stanford Stadium, Stanford
Attendance: 75.239
Referee: Cha (KOR)

August 3, 1984
19:00

Morocco	0 – 2	Brazil
	Report	Dunga 64'; Kita 70'

Rose Bowl, Pasadena
Attendance: 49.355
Referee: Sánchez (ESP)

=== Quarter-finals ===
August 6, 1984
17:00

Brazil	1 – 1 (aet)	Canada
Gilmar Popoca 72'	Report	Mitchell 58'
Penalties
Gilmar (penalty scored); Kita (penalty scored); Ademir (penalty scored); André Luiz (penalty scored)	4 – 2	(penalty scored) Wilson; (penalty missed) Mitchell; (penalty missed) Bridge; (penalty scored) Gray

Stanford Stadium, Stanford
Attendance: 36.150
Referee: Siles (CRC)

=== Semi-finals ===
August 8, 1984
20:30

Italy	1 – 2 (aet)	Brazil
Fanna 62'	Report	Gilmar Popoca 53'; Ronaldo 95'

Stanford Stadium, Stanford
Attendance: 83.642
Referee: Socha (USA)

=== Gold Medal match ===
August 11, 1984
19:00

France	2 – 0	Brazil
Brisson 55'; Xuereb 60'	Report

Rose Bowl, Pasadena
Attendance: 101.799
Referee: Keizer (NED)

== Gymnastics ==
=== Artistic ===
Men

Athlete	Event	Qualification								Final							
Athlete	Event	Apparatus						Total	Rank	Apparatus						Total	Rank
Athlete	Event	F	PH	R	V	PB	HB	Total	Rank	F	PH	R	V	PB	HB	Total	Rank
Gerson Gnoatto	All-around	18.25	17.40	18.45	18.95	16.95	18.05	108.05	70	Did not advance							

Women

Athlete	Event	Qualification						Final					
Athlete	Event	Apparatus				Total	Rank	Apparatus				Total	Rank
Athlete	Event	F	V	UB	BB	Total	Rank	F	V	UB	BB	Total	Rank
Tatiana Figueiredo	All-around	18.70	18.65	17.20	18.05	72.60	57 Q	9.600	9.650	9.400	9.450	74.400	27

== Judo ==
A traditional sport in Brazil, Judo has warranted three medals, for Brazilian men. Two bronze medals, and a silver medal.

Men

Athlete	Event	Round 1	Round 2	Round 3	Round 4	Round 5	Repechage 1	Repechage 2	Repechage 3	Final / BM	
Athlete	Event	Opposition Result	Opposition Result	Opposition Result	Opposition Result	Opposition Result	Opposition Result	Opposition Result	Opposition Result	Opposition Result	Rank
Luiz Shinohara	−60 kg	—N/a	Philip Takahashi (CAN); W 0001-0000	Shinji Hosokawa (JPN); L 0000-0001	Did not advance			João Carvahlo das Neves (POR); W 1000-0000	Felice Mariani (ITA); L 0000-0001	Did not advance	7
Sérgio Sano	−65 kg	BYE	Fredy Torres (ESA); W 1000-0000	James Rohleder (GER); W 0010-0000	Hwang Jung-oh (KOR); L 0000-0010	Did not advance			Josef Reiter (AUT); L 0000-1000	Did not advance	7
Luis Onmura	−71 kg	—N/a	Yousry Zagloul (EGY); W 1000-0000	Hassan Ben Gamra (TUN); W 0100-0000	Michael Swain (USA); W 1000-0000	Ezio Gamba (ITA); L 0000-1000	BYE			Glenn Beauchamp (CAN); W 0010-0000	Bronze medal
Rogério Santos	−78 kg	BYE	Filip Lescak (YUG); L 0000-0100	Did not advance							20
Walter Carmona	−86 kg	—N/a	Atif Hussain (EGY); W 1000-0000	Michel Grant (SWE); W 1000-0000	Bernhard Spijkers (ROU); W 0001-0000	Robert Berland (USA); L 0000-0010	BYE			Densign White (GBR); W 0010-0000	Bronze medal
Douglas Vieira	−95 kg	—N/a	Alberto Rubio Sebastian (ESP); W 0010-0000	Abdul Daffe (SEN); W 1000-0000	Yuri Fazi (ITA); W 0001-0000	Bjarni Friðriksson (ISL); W 0001-0000	BYE			Ha Hyung-joo (KOR); L 0000-0001	Silver medal
Frederico Flexa	+95 kg	—N/a		Alexander von der Groeben (GER); L 0000-1000	Did not advance						11

== Rhythmic gymnastics ==
Athlete	Event	Qualification						Final					
Athlete	Event	Rope	Hoop	Clubs	Ribbon	Prelim Total	Rank	Rope	Hoop	Clubs	Ribbon	Total	Rank
Rosana Favila	Individual	8.950	9.150	9.200	8.550	35.650	24	Did not advance					

== Rowing ==
Men

Athlete	Event	Heats		Repechage		Semifinals		Final	
Athlete	Event	Time	Rank	Time	Rank	Time	Rank	Time	Rank
Ronaldo de Carvalho; Ricardo de Carvalho	Coxless pair	7:32.69	4 R	7:05.24	3 SF	7:05.92	6 FB	7:03.97	8
Walter Soares; Angelo Roso Neto; Nilton Alonso	Coxed pairs	7:18.96	2 R	7:19.40	1 FA	—N/a		7:17.07	4
André Berezin; Luiz dos Santos; Dênis Marinho; Laildo Machado; Manuel Mandel	Coxed four	6:39.88	4 R	6:33.44	5 FB	—N/a		6:47.13	7

== Sailing ==
Open

Athlete	Event	Race														Final rank	
Athlete	Event	1		2		3		4		5		6		7		Final rank	
Athlete	Event	Score	Rank	Score	Rank	Score	Rank	Score	Rank	Score	Rank	Score	Rank	Score	Rank	Score	Rank
Jorge Zarif Neto	Finn	8	14.0	1	0.0	6	11.7	~~19~~	~~25.0~~	11	17.0	15	21.0	9	15.0	78.7	8
Marco Paradeda; Rolf Nehn	470	17	23.0	16	22.0	16	22.0	9	15.0	2	3.0	~~19~~	~~25.0~~	8	14.0	99.0	13
Alan Adler; Marcos Tenke	Flying Dutchman	5	10.0	~~PMS~~	~~24.0~~	13	19.0	6	11.7	2	3.0	2	3.0	9	15.0	61.7	6
Lars Grael; Glein Haynes	Tornado	5	10.0	8	14.0	~~14~~	~~20.0~~	11	17.0	3	5.7	5	10.0	12	18.0	74.7	7
Eduardo Ramos; Roberto Souza	Star	9	15.0	8	14.0	7	13.0	9	15.0	5	10.0	9	15.0	~~12~~	~~18.0~~	82.0	12
Torben Grael; Daniel Adler; Ronaldo Senfft	Soling	3	5.7	7	13.0	2	3.0	~~10~~	~~16.0~~	10	16.0	1	0.0	3	5.7	43.4	Silver medal

== Shooting ==
Men

Athlete	Event	Final	
Athlete	Event	Score	Rank
Waldemar Capucci	50 m rifle prone	581	52
Sylvio Carvalho	50 m pistol	546	25
Durval Guimarães	50 m rifle prone	583	45
Delival Nobre	25 m rapid fire pistol	591	4
Paulo Pimenta	10 m air rifle	557	45

Women

Athlete	Event	Final	
Athlete	Event	Score	Rank
Débora Srour	25 m pistol	578	7

Open

Athlete	Event	Final	
Athlete	Event	Score	Rank
Marcos José Olsen	Trap	188	10
Avelino Palma	Trap	164	60

== Swimming ==
Men

Athlete	Event	Heat		Semifinal		Final	
Athlete	Event	Time	Rank	Time	Rank	Time	Rank
Luiz Carvalho	100 metre breaststroke	1:05.96	24	Did not advance			
Luiz Carvalho	200 metre breaststroke	DSQ		Did not advance			
Cyro Delgado	100 metre freestyle	51.74	18	Did not advance			
Cyro Delgado	200 metre freestyle	1:53.22	21	Did not advance			
Jorge Fernandes	200 metre freestyle	1:53.03	20	Did not advance			
Marcelo Jucá	400 metre freestyle	3:57.43	15 q	3:58.23	15	Did not advance	
Marcelo Jucá	1500 metre freestyle	15:43.80	17	Did not advance			
Marcelo Jucá	200 metre butterfly	DNS		Did not advance			
Djan Madruga	200 metre backstroke	2:05.23	13 q	Did not advance		2:05.33	12
Ronald Menezes	100 metre freestyle	52.49	28	Did not advance			
Ricardo Prado	200 metre backstroke	2:04.46	8 Q	Did not advance		2:03.05	4
Ricardo Prado	200 metre butterfly	2:00.59	10 q	DNS		Did not advance	
Ricardo Prado	200 m individual medley	2:07.16	17	Did not advance			
Ricardo Prado	400 m individual medley	4:23.31	4 Q	Did not advance		4:18.45 SA	Silver medal
Jorge Fernandes; Ronald Menezes; Cyro Delgado; Djan Madruga	4 × 100 metre freestyle relay	3:27.33	10	Did not advance			
Jorge Fernandes; Marcelo Jucá; Cyro Delgado; Djan Madruga	4 × 200 metre freestyle relay	7:30.41	9	Did not advance			
Ricardo Prado; Luiz Carvalho; Marcelo Jucá; Cyro Delgado	4 × 100 metre medley relay	3:53.49	12	Did not advance			

== Synchronized swimming ==
Women

Athlete	Event	Preliminary				Final			
Athlete	Event	Technical	Free	Total	Rank	Points	Rank	Total	Rank
Paula Carvalho	Solo	79.900	85.80	165.700	13	Did not advance			
Paula Carvalho; Tessa Carvalho	Duet	82.092	84.20	166.292	11	Did not advance			

== Volleyball ==
=== Men's team competition ===
==== Pool A ====
Pos	Team	Pld	W	L	Pts	SW	SL	SR	SPW	SPL	SPR	Qualification
1	Brazil	4	3	1	7	10	4	2.500	191	144	1.326	Semifinals
2	United States	4	3	1	7	9	4	2.250	168	117	1.436	Semifinals
3	South Korea	4	3	1	7	9	6	1.500	203	162	1.253	5th–8th semifinals
4	Argentina	4	1	3	5	7	9	0.778	184	207	0.889	5th–8th semifinals
5	Tunisia	4	0	4	4	0	12	0.000	64	180	0.356	9th place match

Date		Score		Set 1	Set 2	Set 3	Set 4	Set 5	Total
31 Jul	Brazil	3–1	Argentina	15–8	15–8	16–18	15–13		61–47
02 Aug	Brazil	3–0	Tunisia	15–5	15–9	15–2			45–16
04 Aug	South Korea	3–1	Brazil	15–4	15–13	13–15	15–8		58–40
06 Aug	Brazil	3–0	United States	15–10	15–11	15–2			45–23

==== Semifinals ====
Date		Score		Set 1	Set 2	Set 3	Set 4	Set 5	Total
08 Aug	Brazil	3–1	Italy	12–15	15–2	15–3	15–5		57–25

==== Gold medal match ====
Date		Score		Set 1	Set 2	Set 3	Set 4	Set 5	Total
11 Aug	Brazil	0–3	United States	6–15	6–15	7–15			19–45

Team Roster

- Renan dal Zotto
- William Carvalho da Silva
- Fernando d'Àvila
- Mário Xandó de Oliveira Neto
- Bernardo Rocha de Rezende
- Rui Campos do Nascimento
- Marcus Vinicius Simòes Freire
- Domingos Lampariello Neto
- José Montanaro
- Bernard Rajzman
- Antônio Carlos Gueiros Ribeiro

Head coach: Bebeto de Freitas

=== Women's team competition ===
==== Group A ====
Pos	Team	Pld	W	L	Pts	SW	SL	SR	SPW	SPL	SPR	Qualification
1	United States	3	3	0	6	9	3	3.000	167	139	1.201	1st–4th semifinals
2	China	3	2	1	5	7	3	2.333	144	101	1.426	1st–4th semifinals
3	West Germany	3	1	2	4	3	6	0.500	93	126	0.738	5th–8th semifinals
4	Brazil	3	0	3	3	2	9	0.222	120	158	0.759	5th–8th semifinals

Date		Score		Set 1	Set 2	Set 3	Set 4	Set 5	Total	Report
30 Jul	China	3–0	Brazil	15–13	15–10	15–11			45–34	Report
1 Aug	United States	3–2	Brazil	12–15	10–15	15–5	15–5	15–12	67–52	Report
3 Aug	Brazil	0–3	West Germany	9–15	14–16	11–15			34–46	Report

==== 5th–8th place semifinals ====
Date		Score		Set 1	Set 2	Set 3	Set 4	Set 5	Total	Report
5 Aug	South Korea	3–1	Brazil	13–15	15–13	15–9	15–10		58–47	Report

==== 7th place natch ====
Date		Score		Set 1	Set 2	Set 3	Set 4	Set 5	Total	Report
7 Aug	Canada	0–3	Brazil	9–15	3–15	8–15			20–45	Report

Team Roster

- Vera Mossa
- Fernanda Emerick Silva
- Mônica da Silva
- Isabel Salgado
- Heloísa Roese
- Regina Vilela Santos-Uchoa
- Jackie Silva
- Ana Richa
- Sandra Suruagy
- Eliana da Costa
- Luiza Machado
- Ida Alvares

Head coach: Ênio Figueiredo

== Water polo ==
=== Men's team competition ===
==== Group B ====
Qualified for second group stage

Team	GP	W	D	L	GF	GA	GD	Pts
United States	3	3	0	0	32	17	+15	6
Spain	3	2	0	1	39	31	+8	4
Greece	3	0	1	2	23	33	–10	1
Brazil	3	0	1	2	25	38	−13	1

- August 1

Spain	19 – 12	Brazil

- August 2

United States	10 – 4	Brazil

- August 3

Greece	9 – 9	Brazil

==== Group E ====
	Team	Points	G	W	D	L	GF	GA	Diff
7.	Italy	9	5	4	1	0	63	34	+29
8.	Greece	8	5	3	2	0	52	41	+11
9.	China	6	5	3	0	2	44	39	+5
10.	Canada	3	5	1	1	3	40	48	–8
11.	Japan	2	5	1	0	4	30	55	–25
12.	Brazil	2	5	0	2	3	40	52	–12

- August 6

Italy	13 – 4	Brazil

- August 7

Canada	10 – 10	Brazil

- August 9

China	11 – 9	Brazil

- August 10

Japan	9 – 8	Brazil

- Team Roster
  - Roberto Borelli
  - Orlando Chaves
  - Paulo Sérgio Abreu
  - Carlos Carvalho
  - Sílvio Manfredi
  - Sólon Santos
  - Ricardo Tonieto
  - Eric Tebbe Borges
  - Mário Souto
  - Mário Sérgio Lotufo
  - Fernando Carsalade
  - Hélio Silva
  - André Campos
