= List of Olympic medalists for Brazil =

This is a full list of all medalists from Brazil at the Olympic Games. For more information about Brazil at the Olympics, click here.

== List of medalists ==
=== Summer Games ===
Medal	Athletes	Games	Sport	Event	Date
Gold	Guilherme Paraense	(Belgium) 1920 Antwerp	Shooting	Men's 30 m military pistol	3 August 1920
Silver	Afrânio da Costa	(Belgium) 1920 Antwerp	Shooting	Men's 50 metre free pistol	2 August 1920
Bronze	Afrânio da Costa; Dario Barbosa; Fernando Soledade; Guilherme Paraense; Sebastião Wolf	(Belgium) 1920 Antwerp	Shooting	Men's 50 metre team free pistol	2 August 1920
Bronze	Men's basketball team: Affonso Évora Alberto Marson Alexandre Gemignani Alfredo da Motta Guilherme Rodrigues João Francisco Bráz Luís Benvenuti Marcus Vinícius Dias Massinet Sorcinelli Nilton Pacheco Ruy de Freitas Zenny Algodão	(United Kingdom) 1948 London	Basketball	Men's tournament	13 August 1948
Gold	Adhemar Ferreira da Silva	(Finland) 1952 Helsinki	Athletics	Men's triple jump	23 July 1952
Bronze	José Telles da Conceição	(Finland) 1952 Helsinki	Athletics	Men's high jump	20 July 1952
Bronze	Tetsuo Okamoto	(Finland) 1952 Helsinki	Swimming	Men's 1500 metre freestyle	2 August 1952
Gold	Adhemar Ferreira da Silva	(Australia) 1956 Melbourne	Athletics	Men's triple jump	27 November 1956
Bronze	Manoel dos Santos Júnior	(Italy) 1960 Rome	Swimming	Men's 100 metre freestyle	27 August 1960
Bronze	Men's basketball team: Amaury Pasos Antônio Sucar Carlos Mosquito Carmo Rosa Branca Édson Bispo Fernando Brobró Jatyr Schall Moysés Blás Waldemar Blatskauskas Waldyr Boccardo Wlamir Marques Zenny Algodão	(Italy) 1960 Rome	Basketball	Men's tournament	10 September 1960
Bronze	Men's basketball team: Amaury Pasos Antônio Sucar Carlos Mosquito Carmo Rosa Branca Édson Bispo Edvar Simões Fritz Braun Jatyr Schall Sérgio Macarrão Ubiratan Maciel Victor Mirshawka Wlamir Marques	(Japan) 1964 Tokyo	Basketball	Men's tournament	23 October 1964
Silver	Nelson Prudêncio	1968 Mexico City	Athletics	Men's triple jump	17 October 1968
Bronze	Burkhard Cordes; Reinaldo Conrad	1968 Mexico City	Sailing	Open's Flying Dutchman	21 October 1968
Bronze	Servílio de Oliveira	1968 Mexico City	Boxing	Men's Flyweight	24 October 1968
Bronze	Chiaki Ishii	(West Germany) 1972 Munich	Judo	Men's 93 kg	1 September 1972
Bronze	Nelson Prudêncio	(West Germany) 1972 Munich	Athletics	Men's triple jump	4 September 1972
Bronze	Peter Ficker; Reinaldo Conrad	(Canada) 1976 Montreal	Sailing	Open's Flying Dutchman	27 July 1976
Bronze	João Carlos de Oliveira	(Canada) 1976 Montreal	Athletics	Men's triple jump	30 July 1976
Gold	Alexandre Welter; Lars Björkström	(Soviet Union) 1980 Moscow	Sailing	Open's Tornado	29 July 1980
Gold	Eduardo Penido; Marcos Soares	(Soviet Union) 1980 Moscow	Sailing	Open's 470 class	29 July 1980
Bronze	Cyro Delgado; Djan Madruga; Jorge Fernandes; Marcus Mattioli	(Soviet Union) 1980 Moscow	Swimming	Men's 4 × 200 metre freestyle relay	23 July 1980
Bronze	João Carlos de Oliveira	(Soviet Union) 1980 Moscow	Athletics	Men's triple jump	24 July 1980
Gold	Joaquim Cruz	(United States) 1984 Los Angeles	Athletics	Men's 800 m	6 August 1984
Silver	Ricardo Prado	(United States) 1984 Los Angeles	Swimming	Men's 400 metre individual medley	30 July 1984
Silver	Daniel Adler; Ronaldo Senfft; Torben Grael	(United States) 1984 Los Angeles	Sailing	Open's Soling	8 August 1984
Silver	Douglas Vieira	(United States) 1984 Los Angeles	Judo	Men's 95 kg	9 August 1984
Silver	Men's Brazil Olympic football team: Ademir Roque André Luís Ferreira Carlos Dunga Chicão Vidal Davi Cortes Gilmar Popoca Gilmar Rinaldi João Kita Jorge Pinga Luís Henrique Dias Luiz Carlos Winck Mauro Galvão Milton Cruz Paulo Santos Ronaldo Moraes Silvinho Paiva Tonho Gil	(United States) 1984 Los Angeles	Football	Men's tournament	11 August 1984
Silver	Men's national volleyball team: Amauri Ribeiro Antônio Carlos Badalhoca Bernard Rajzman Bernardinho Rezende Domingos Maracanã Fernandão Ávila José Montanaro Marcus Vinícius Freire Mário Xandó Renan Dal Zotto Rui Campos William Carvalho	(United States) 1984 Los Angeles	Volleyball	Men's tournament	11 August 1984
Bronze	Luiz Onmura	(United States) 1984 Los Angeles	Judo	Men's 71 kg	6 August 1984
Bronze	Walter Carmona	(United States) 1984 Los Angeles	Judo	Men's 86 kg	8 August 1984
Gold	Aurélio Miguel	(South Korea) 1988 Seoul	Judo	Men's 95 kg	30 September 1988
Silver	Joaquim Cruz	(South Korea) 1988 Seoul	Athletics	Men's 800 m	26 September 1988
Silver	Men's Brazil Olympic football team: Ademir Roque Aloísio Pires André Cruz Bebeto Gama Cláudio Taffarel Edmar Bernardes Geovani Silva Hamilton Careca Iomar Mazinho João Batista Viana João Paulo Donizetti Jorginho Amorim Jorge Andrade José Ferreira Neto Luiz Carlos Winck Milton Souza Nelsinho Kerchner Ricardo Gomes Romário Faria Valdo Cândido Zé Carlos da Costa	(South Korea) 1988 Seoul	Football	Men's tournament	1 October 1988
Bronze	Nelson Falcão; Torben Grael	(South Korea) 1988 Seoul	Sailing	Open's Star	27 September 1988
Bronze	Clinio Freitas; Lars Grael	(South Korea) 1988 Seoul	Sailing	Open's Tornado	27 September 1988
Bronze	Robson Caetano	(South Korea) 1988 Seoul	Athletics	Men's 200 m	28 September 1988
Gold	Rogério Sampaio	(Spain) 1992 Barcelona	Judo	Men's 65 kg	1 August 1992
Gold	Men's national volleyball team: Amauri Ribeiro André Felippe Pampa Carlão Gouveia Douglas Chiarotti Giovane Gávio Janelson Carvalho Jorge Edson Marcelo Negrão Maurício Lima Paulão Jukoski Talmo Oliveira Tande Samuel	(Spain) 1992 Barcelona	Volleyball	Men's tournament	9 August 1992
Silver	Gustavo Borges	(Spain) 1992 Barcelona	Swimming	Men's 100 metre freestyle	28 July 1992
Gold	Jaqueline Silva; Sandra Pires	(United States) 1996 Atlanta	Beach volleyball	Women's tournament	27 July 1996
Gold	Marcelo Ferreira; Torben Grael	(United States) 1996 Atlanta	Sailing	Open's Star	29 July 1996
Gold	Robert Scheidt	(United States) 1996 Atlanta	Sailing	Open's Laser	31 July 1996
Silver	Gustavo Borges	(United States) 1996 Atlanta	Swimming	Men's 200 metre freestyle	20 July 1996
Silver	Adriana Samuel; Mônica Rodrigues	(United States) 1996 Atlanta	Beach volleyball	Women's tournament	27 July 1996
Silver	Women's basketball team: Adriana Santos Alessandra Santos Branca Gonçalves Cíntia Tuiú Cláudia Pastor Hortência Marcari Janeth Arcain Leila Sobral Marta Sobral Paula Gonçalves Roseli Gustavo Silvinha Luz	(United States) 1996 Atlanta	Basketball	Women's tournament	4 August 1996
Bronze	Aurélio Miguel	(United States) 1996 Atlanta	Judo	Men's 95 kg	21 July 1996
Bronze	Gustavo Borges	(United States) 1996 Atlanta	Swimming	Men's 100 metre freestyle	22 July 1996
Bronze	Henrique Guimarães	(United States) 1996 Atlanta	Judo	Men's 65 kg	25 July 1996
Bronze	Fernando Scherer	(United States) 1996 Atlanta	Swimming	Men's 50 metre freestyle	25 July 1996
Bronze	Kiko Pelicano; Lars Grael	(United States) 1996 Atlanta	Sailing	Open's Tornado	30 July 1996
Bronze	Álvaro Doda de Miranda Neto; André Johannpeter; Luiz Felipe de Azevedo; Rodrigo Pessoa	(United States) 1996 Atlanta	Equestrian	Team jumping open	1 August 1996
Bronze	Men's under-23 football team: Aldair Nascimento Alexandre Amaral André Luiz Moreira Bebeto Gama Danrlei Hinterholz Dida da Silva Flávio Conceição Juninho Paulista Luizão Goulart Marcelinho Paulista Narciso dos Santos Rivaldo Borba Roberto Carlos Ronaldo Guiaro Ronaldo Nazário Sávio Pimentel Zé Elias Moedim Zé Maria Ferreira	(United States) 1996 Atlanta	Football	Men's tournament	2 August 1996
Bronze	Women's national volleyball team: Ana Flávia Sanglard Ana Moser Ana Paula Henkel Fernanda Venturini Filó Bodziak Hélia Fofão Hilma Caldeira Ida Álvares Leila Barros Márcia Fu Sandra Suruagy Virna Dias	(United States) 1996 Atlanta	Volleyball	Women's tournament	3 August 1996
Bronze	André Domingos; Arnaldo Oliveira; Édson Luciano; Robson Caetano	(United States) 1996 Atlanta	Athletics	Men's 4 × 100 metres relay	3 August 1996
Silver	Tiago Camilo	(Australia) 2000 Sydney	Judo	Men's 73 kg	18 September 2000
Silver	Carlos Honorato	(Australia) 2000 Sydney	Judo	Men's 90 kg	20 September 2000
Silver	Adriana Behar; Shelda Bedê	(Australia) 2000 Sydney	Beach volleyball	Women's tournament	25 September 2000
Silver	Ricardo Santos; Zé Marco Melo	(Australia) 2000 Sydney	Beach volleyball	Men's tournament	26 September 2000
Silver	Robert Scheidt	(Australia) 2000 Sydney	Sailing	Open's Laser	29 September 2000
Silver	André Domingos; Claudinei Quirino; Cláudio Roberto Sousa; Édson Luciano; Vicente Lenílson	(Australia) 2000 Sydney	Athletics	Men's 4 × 100 metres relay	30 September 2000
Bronze	Carlos Jayme; Edvaldo Valério; Fernando Scherer; Gustavo Borges	(Australia) 2000 Sydney	Swimming	Men's 4 × 100 metre freestyle relay	16 September 2000
Bronze	Adriana Samuel; Sandra Pires	(Australia) 2000 Sydney	Beach volleyball	Women's tournament	25 September 2000
Bronze	Álvaro Doda de Miranda Neto; André Johannpeter; Luiz Felipe de Azevedo; Rodrigo Pessoa	(Australia) 2000 Sydney	Equestrian	Team jumping open	28 September 2000
Bronze	Marcelo Ferreira; Torben Grael	(Australia) 2000 Sydney	Sailing	Open's Star	30 September 2000
Bronze	Women's national volleyball team: Elisângela Oliveira Erika Coimbra Hélia Fofão Janina Conceição Karin Rodrigues Kátia Lopes Kelly Fraga Leila Barros Raquel Silva Ricarda Negrão Virna Dias Walewska Oliveira	(Australia) 2000 Sydney	Volleyball	Women's tournament	30 September 2000
Bronze	Women's basketball team: Adriana Pinto Adriana Santos Alessandra Santos Cíntia Tuiú Cláudia Neves Helen Luz Janeth Arcain Kelly Santos Lilian Gonçalves Marta Sobral Silvinha Luz Zaine David	(Australia) 2000 Sydney	Basketball	Women's tournament	30 September 2000
Gold	Robert Scheidt	(Greece) 2004 Athens	Sailing	Open's Laser	22 August 2004
Gold	Emanuel Rego; Ricardo Santos	(Greece) 2004 Athens	Beach volleyball	Men's tournament	25 August 2004
Gold	Rodrigo Pessoa	(Greece) 2004 Athens	Equestrian	Individual jumping open	29 August 2005
Gold	Marcelo Ferreira; Torben Grael	(Greece) 2004 Athens	Sailing	Men's Star	28 August 2004
Gold	Men's national volleyball team: Anderson Rodrigues André Heller André Nascimento Dante Amaral Giba Godoy Giovane Gávio Gustavo Endres Maurício Lima Nalbert Bitencourt Ricardinho Garcia Rodrigão Santana Sérgio Dutra	(Greece) 2004 Athens	Volleyball	Men's tournament	29 August 2004
Silver	Adriana Behar; Shelda Bedê	(Greece) 2004 Athens	Beach volleyball	Women's tournament	24 August 2004
Silver	Women's national football team: Aline Pellegrino Andréia Suntaque Cristiane Rozeira Daniela Alves Dayane Rocha Delma Pretinha Elaine Estrela Grazi Nascimento Juliana Cabral Kelly Cristina Marlisa Maravilha Marta Vieira Maycon Santos Miraíldes Formiga Mônica de Paula Renata Kóki Rosana Augusto Roseli de Belo Tânia Maranhão	(Greece) 2004 Athens	Football	Women's tournament	26 August 2004
Bronze	Leandro Guilheiro	(Greece) 2004 Athens	Judo	Men's 73 kg	16 August 2004
Bronze	Flávio Canto	(Greece) 2004 Athens	Judo	Men's 81 kg	17 August 2004
Bronze	Vanderlei Cordeiro de Lima	(Greece) 2004 Athens	Athletics	Men's marathon	29 August 2004
Gold	César Cielo	(China) 2008 Beijing	Swimming	Men's 50 metre freestyle	16 August 2008
Gold	Maurren Maggi	(China) 2008 Beijing	Athletics	Women's long jump	22 August 2008
Gold	Women's national volleyball team: Carol Albuquerque Fabi Alvim Fabiana Claudino Hélia Fofão Jaqueline Carvalho Mari Steinbrecher Paula Pequeno Sassá Gonzaga Sheilla Castro Thaísa Daher Valeskinha Menezes Walewska Oliveira	(China) 2008 Beijing	Volleyball	Women's tournament	23 August 2008
Silver	Bruno Prada; Robert Scheidt	(China) 2008 Beijing	Sailing	Men's Star	21 August 2008
Silver	Women's national football team: Andréia Rosa Andréia Suntaque Bárbara Barbosa Cristiane Rozeira Daniela Alves Delma Pretinha Érika Santos Ester Santos Fabiana Simões Fancielle Alberto Marta Vieira Maurine Gonçalves Maycon Santos Miraíldes Formiga Renata Kóki Rosana Augusto Simone Jatobá Tânia Maranhão	(China) 2008 Beijing	Football	Women's tournament	21 August 2008
Silver	Fábio Luiz Magalhães; Márcio Araújo	(China) 2008 Beijing	Beach volleyball	Men's tournament	22 August 2008
Silver	Men's national volleyball team: Anderson Rodrigues André Heller André Nascimento Bruno Rezende Dante Amaral Giba Godoy Gustavo Endres Marcelinho Elgarten Murilo Endres Rodrigão Santana Samuel Fuchs Sérgio Dutra	(China) 2008 Beijing	Volleyball	Men's tournament	24 August 2008
Bronze	Ketleyn Quadros	(China) 2008 Beijing	Judo	Women's 57 kg	11 August 2008
Bronze	Leandro Guilheiro	(China) 2008 Beijing	Judo	Men's 73 kg	11 August 2008
Bronze	Tiago Camilo	(China) 2008 Beijing	Judo	Men's 81 kg	12 August 2008
Bronze	César Cielo	(China) 2008 Beijing	Swimming	Men's 100 metre freestyle	14 August 2008
Bronze	Fernanda Oliveira; Isabel Swan	(China) 2008 Beijing	Sailing	Women's 470 class	18 August 2008
Bronze	Lucimar de Moura; Rosângela Santos; Rosemar Coelho Neto; Thaíssa Presti	(China) 2008 Beijing	Athletics	Women's 4 × 100 metres relay	29 March 2017
Bronze	Bruno Lins; José Carlos Codó; Sandro Viana; Vicente Lenílson	(China) 2008 Beijing	Athletics	Men's 4 × 100 metres relay	31 October 2019
Bronze	Emanuel Rego; Ricardo Santos	(China) 2008 Beijing	Beach volleyball	Men's tournament	22 August 2008
Bronze	Men's under-23 football team: Alex Silva Alexandre Pato Anderson Abreu Breno Borges Diego Alves Diego Ribas Hernanes Lima Ilsinho Dias Jô de Assis Lucas Leiva Marcelo Vieira Rafael Sóbis Rafinha Souza Ramires Nascimento Renan Soares Ronaldinho Moreira Thiago Neves Thiago Silva	(China) 2008 Beijing	Football	Men's tournament	22 August 2008
Bronze	Natália Falavigna	(China) 2008 Beijing	Taekwondo	Women's +67 kg	23 August 2008
Gold	Sarah Menezes	(United Kingdom) 2012 London	Judo	Women's 48 kg	28 July 2012
Gold	Arthur Zanetti	(United Kingdom) 2012 London	Artistic gymnastics	Men's rings	6 August 2012
Gold	Women's national volleyball team: Adenízia da Silva Dani Lins Fabi Alvim Fabiana Claudino Fernanda Ferreira Fernanda Garay Jaqueline Carvalho Natália Pereira Paula Pequeno Sheilla Castro Tandara Caixeta Thaísa Daher	(United Kingdom) 2012 London	Volleyball	Women's tournament	11 August 2012
Silver	Thiago Pereira	(United Kingdom) 2012 London	Swimming	Men's 400 metre individual medley	28 July 2012
Silver	Esquiva Falcão	(United Kingdom) 2012 London	Boxing	Men's middleweight	11 August 2012
Silver	Alison Cerutti; Emanuel Rego	(United Kingdom) 2012 London	Beach volleyball	Men's tournament	9 August 2012
Silver	Men's under-23 football team: Alex Sandro Alexandre Pato Bruno Uvini Danilo Luiz Gabriel Vasconcellos Hulk Vieira Juan Jesus Leandro Damião Lucas Moura Marcelo Vieira Neto Murara Neymar Júnior Oscar Emboaba Paulo Henrique Ganso Rafael Pereira Rômulo Monteiro Sandro Ranieri Thiago Silva	(United Kingdom) 2012 London	Football	Men's tournament	11 August 2012
Silver	Men's national volleyball team: Bruno Rezende Dante Amaral Giba Godoy Leandro Vissotto Lucão Saatkamp Murilo Endres Ricardinho Garcia Rodrigão Santana Sérgio Dutra Sidão dos Santos Thiago Alves Wallace de Souza	(United Kingdom) 2012 London	Volleyball	Men's tournament	12 August 2012
Bronze	Felipe Kitadai	(United Kingdom) 2012 London	Judo	Men's 60 kg	28 July 2012
Bronze	Mayra Aguiar	(United Kingdom) 2012 London	Judo	Women's 78 kg	2 August 2012
Bronze	Rafael Silva	(United Kingdom) 2012 London	Judo	Men's +100 kg	3 August 2012
Bronze	César Cielo	(United Kingdom) 2012 London	Swimming	Men's 50 metre freestyle	3 August 2012
Bronze	Bruno Prada; Robert Scheidt	(United Kingdom) 2012 London	Sailing	Men's Star	5 August 2012
Bronze	Juliana Silva; Larissa França	(United Kingdom) 2012 London	Beach volleyball	Women's tournament	8 August 2012
Bronze	Adriana Araújo	(United Kingdom) 2012 London	Boxing	Women's lightweight	8 August 2012
Bronze	Yamaguchi Falcão	(United Kingdom) 2012 London	Boxing	Men's light heavyweight	10 August 2012
Bronze	Yane Marques	(United Kingdom) 2012 London	Modern pentathlon	Women's event	12 August 2012
Gold	Rafaela Silva	(Brazil) 2016 Rio de Janeiro	Judo	Women's 57 kg	8 August 2016
Gold	Thiago Braz	(Brazil) 2016 Rio de Janeiro	Athletics	Men's pole vault	15 August 2016
Gold	Robson Conceição	(Brazil) 2016 Rio de Janeiro	Boxing	Men's lightweight	16 August 2016
Gold	Kahena Kunze; Martine Grael	(Brazil) 2016 Rio de Janeiro	Sailing	Women's 49erFX	18 August 2016
Gold	Alison Cerutti; Bruno Schmidt	(Brazil) 2016 Rio de Janeiro	Beach volleyball	Men's tournament	18 August 2016
Gold	Men's under-23 football team: Douglas Santos Felipe Ânderson Gabriel Barbosa Gabriel Jesus Luan Garcia Luan Guilherme Marquinhos Aoás Neymar Júnior Rafinha Alcântara Renato Augusto Rodrigo Caio Rodrigo Dourado Thiago Maia Uílson Pedruzzi Walace Souza Silva Weverton Pereira William de Asevedo Zeca Cracco	(Brazil) 2016 Rio de Janeiro	Football	Men's tournament	20 August 2016
Gold	Men's national volleyball team: Bruno Rezende Douglas Souza Éder Carbonera Evandro Guerra Lipe Fonteles Lucão Saatkamp Maurício Borges Maurício Souza Ricardo Lucarelli Sérgio Dutra Wallace de Souza William Arjona	(Brazil) 2016 Rio de Janeiro	Volleyball	Men's tournament	21 August 2016
Silver	Felipe Wu	(Brazil) 2016 Rio de Janeiro	Shooting	Men's 10 metre air pistol	6 August 2016
Silver	Diego Hypólito	(Brazil) 2016 Rio de Janeiro	Artistic gymnastics	Men's floor	14 August 2016
Silver	Arthur Zanetti	(Brazil) 2016 Rio de Janeiro	Artistic gymnastics	Men's rings	15 August 2016
Silver	Isaquias Queiroz	(Brazil) 2016 Rio de Janeiro	Canoeing	Men's C-1 1000 metres	16 August 2016
Silver	Ágatha Bednarczuk; Bárbara Seixas	(Brazil) 2016 Rio de Janeiro	Beach volleyball	Women's tournament	17 August 2016
Silver	Erlon de Souza; Isaquias Queiroz	(Brazil) 2016 Rio de Janeiro	Canoeing	Men's C-2 1000 metres	20 August 2016
Bronze	Mayra Aguiar	(Brazil) 2016 Rio de Janeiro	Judo	Women's 78 kg	11 August 2016
Bronze	Rafael Silva	(Brazil) 2016 Rio de Janeiro	Judo	Men's +100 kg	12 August 2016
Bronze	Arthur Nory Mariano	(Brazil) 2016 Rio de Janeiro	Artistic gymnastics	Men's floor	14 August 2016
Bronze	Poliana Okimoto	(Brazil) 2016 Rio de Janeiro	Open Waters	Women's marathon 10 kilometre	15 August 2016
Bronze	Isaquias Queiroz	(Brazil) 2016 Rio de Janeiro	Canoeing	Men's C-1 200 metres	18 August 2016
Bronze	Maicon de Andrade	(Brazil) 2016 Rio de Janeiro	Taekwondo	Men's +80 kg	20 August 2016
Gold	Ítalo Ferreira	(Japan) 2020 Tokyo	Surfing	Men's shortboard	27 July 2021
Gold	Rebeca Andrade	(Japan) 2020 Tokyo	Artistic gymnastics	Women's vault	1 August 2021
Gold	Kahena Kunze; Martine Grael	(Japan) 2020 Tokyo	Sailing	Women's 49erFX	3 August 2021
Gold	Ana Marcela Cunha	(Japan) 2020 Tokyo	Open Waters	Women's marathon 10 kilometre	4 August 2021
Gold	Isaquias Queiroz	(Japan) 2020 Tokyo	Canoeing	Men's C-1 1000 metres	7 August 2021
Gold	Hebert Conceição	(Japan) 2020 Tokyo	Boxing	Men's middleweight	7 August 2021
Gold	Men's under-23 football team: Abner Vinícius Aderbar Santos Antony Matheus Brenno Fraga Bruno Fuchs Bruno Guimarães Claudinho Leonel Daniel Alves Diego Carlos Douglas Luiz Gabriel Martinelli Gabriel Menino Guilherme Arana Lucão Galdino Malcom Filipe Matheus Cunha Matheus Henrique Nino Mota Paulinho Sampaio Reinier Jesus Ricardo Graça Richarlison de Andrade	(Japan) 2020 Tokyo	Football	Men's tournament	7 August 2021
Silver	Kelvin Hoefler	(Japan) 2020 Tokyo	Skateboarding	Men's street	25 July 2021
Silver	Rayssa Leal	(Japan) 2020 Tokyo	Skateboarding	Women's street	26 July 2021
Silver	Rebeca Andrade	(Japan) 2020 Tokyo	Artistic gymnastics	Women's all-around	29 July 2021
Silver	Pedro Barros	(Japan) 2020 Tokyo	Skateboarding	Men's park	5 August 2021
Silver	Beatriz Ferreira	(Japan) 2020 Tokyo	Boxing	Women's lightweight	8 August 2021
Silver	Women's national volleyball team: Ana Cristina de Souza Bia Correa Camila Brait Carol Gattaz Carol Silva Fernanda Garay Gabi Guimarães Macris Carneiro Natália Pereira Roberta Ratzke Rosamaria Montibeller Tandara Caixeta	(Japan) 2020 Tokyo	Volleyball	Women's tournament	8 August 2021
Bronze	Daniel Cargnin	(Japan) 2020 Tokyo	Judo	Men's 66 kg	25 July 2021
Bronze	Fernando Scheffer	(Japan) 2020 Tokyo	Swimming	Men's 200 metre freestyle	27 July 2021
Bronze	Mayra Aguiar	(Japan) 2020 Tokyo	Judo	Women's 78 kg	29 July 2021
Bronze	Laura Pigossi; Luisa Stefani	(Japan) 2020 Tokyo	Tennis	Women's doubles	31 July 2021
Bronze	Bruno Fratus	(Japan) 2020 Tokyo	Swimming	Men's 50 metre freestyle	1 August 2021
Bronze	Alison dos Santos	(Japan) 2020 Tokyo	Athletics	Men's 400 metres hurdles	3 August 2021
Bronze	Abner Teixeira	(Japan) 2020 Tokyo	Boxing	Men's heavyweight	3 August 2021
Bronze	Thiago Braz	(Japan) 2020 Tokyo	Athletics	Men's pole vault	3 August 2021
Gold	Beatriz Souza	(France) 2024 Paris	Judo	Women's +78 kg	2 August 2024
Gold	Rebeca Andrade	(France) 2024 Paris	Artistic gymnastics	Women's floor	5 August 2024
Gold	Ana Patrícia Ramos; Duda Lisboa	(France) 2024 Paris	Beach volleyball	Women's tournament	9 August 2024
Silver	Willian Lima	(France) 2024 Paris	Judo	Men's 66 kg	28 July 2024
Silver	Caio Bonfim	(France) 2024 Paris	Athletics	Men's 20 km walk	1 August 2024
Silver	Rebeca Andrade	(France) 2024 Paris	Artistic gymnastics	Women's all-around	1 August 2024
Silver	Rebeca Andrade	(France) 2024 Paris	Artistic gymnastics	Women's vault	3 August 2024
Silver	Tatiana Weston-Webb	(France) 2024 Paris	Surfing	Women's shortboard	6 August 2024
Silver	Isaquias Queiroz	(France) 2024 Paris	Canoeing	Men's C-1 1000 metres	9 August 2024
Silver	Women's national football team: Adriana Leal Ana Vitória Angelina Alonso Antônia Silva Duda Sampaio Gabi Nunes Gabi Portilho Jheniffer Cordinali Kerolin Ferraz Lauren Leal Lorena Leite Luciana Dionízio Ludmila da Silva Marta Vieira Priscila Flor da Silva Rafaelle Souza Tainá Borges Tamires Dias Tarciane Lima Thaís Ferreira Vitória Yaya Yasmin Ribeiro	(France) 2024 Paris	Football	Women's tournament	10 August 2024
Bronze	Larissa Pimenta	(France) 2024 Paris	Judo	Women's 52 kg	28 July 2024
Bronze	Rayssa Leal	(France) 2024 Paris	Skateboarding	Women's street	28 July 2024
Bronze	Flávia Saraiva; Jade Barbosa; Júlia Soares; Lorrane Oliveira; Rebeca Andrade	(France) 2024 Paris	Artistic gymnastics	Women's team all-around	30 July 2024
Bronze	Beatriz Souza; Daniel Cargnin; Guilherme Schimidt; Ketleyn Quadros; Larissa Pimenta; Leonardo Gonçalves; Rafael Macedo; Rafael Silva; Rafaela Silva; Willian Lima	(France) 2024 Paris	Judo	Mixed team	3 August 2024
Bronze	Beatriz Ferreira	(France) 2024 Paris	Boxing	Women's lightweight	3 August 2024
Bronze	Gabriel Medina	(France) 2024 Paris	Surfing	Men's shortboard	6 August 2024
Bronze	Augusto Akio	(France) 2024 Paris	Skateboarding	Men's park	7 August 2024
Bronze	Edival Pontes	(France) 2024 Paris	Taekwondo	Men's 68 kg	8 August 2024
Bronze	Alison dos Santos	(France) 2024 Paris	Athletics	Men's 400 metres hurdles	9 August 2024
Bronze	Women's national volleyball team: Ana Cristina de Souza Carol Silva Diana Alecrim Gabi Guimarães Júlia Bergmann Lorenne Geraldo Macris Carneiro Natinha Araújo Nyeme Costa Roberta Ratzke Rosamaria Montibeller Tainara Santos Thaísa Daher	(France) 2024 Paris	Volleyball	Women's tournament	10 August 2024

=== Winter Games ===
Medal	Athletes	Games	Sport	Event	Date
Gold	Lucas Pinheiro Braathen	(Italy) 2026 Milano Cortina	Alpine skiing	Men's giant slalom	14 February 2026

== Medalists in exhibition sports ==
There are also medalists in demonstration sports, or exhibition sports, in which their results are not computed by the IOC for the overall medal table, but the athletes who go to the podium are awarded medals of an identical model to that of the edition, but in a reduced size, with 3/4 of the dimensions of the official medals.

This is the case of tennis at the 1968 Summer Olympics, with the Brazilian Suzana Petersen who competed in doubles with the Ecuadorian María Eugenia Guzmán and with the Soviet, born in Georgia Teimuraz Kakulia, winning three bronze medals by finishing in third place in the three modalities (singles, women's doubles and mixed doubles) and beach volleyball at the 1992 Summer Olympics, with the Brazilian men's doubles Eduardo Garrido and Roberto Moreira, winning the silver medal and André Lima Perlingeiro and Guilherme Marques won the bronze medal. In the women's competition, the duo Roseli Ana Timm and Rose Barcellos won the bronze medal after beating the duo Isabel Salgado and Jackie Silva.

There was also a specific case with the Wushu Tournament at the 2008 Summer Olympics, simply called an "affiliated tournament". The inclusion of the martial arts tournament, also known in the West as Kung Fu, in the Olympic program was requested by the Chinese commission. However, the IOC canceled the inclusion of demonstration or exhibition sports after Barcelona 1992, but made an exception for wushu to be contested with its approval, under certain conditions: the fighters had access to all the Games' infrastructure; they could reside in the Olympic Village, use official transportation and credentials, and their fights were reported in official newsletters, including live broadcasts only on Chinese TV; the sport had its own pictogram; Their matches took place in the same gymnasium that hosted the handball tournament, so all the decorations with the inscription "Beijing 2008", hundreds of volunteers, and all the "Olympic-level" facilities were available to those involved. However, the medals distributed were not the official Games model, the athletes could not participate in the opening and closing ceremonies, and there could be no allusion to the terms "demonstration sport" or "exhibition sport" anywhere. Three Brazilians were in the competition and one was a medalist, the fighter Emerson Nogueira de Almeida won a bronze medal in the sanshou category (up to 85 kg).

== Special Medals ==
In 1932, sprinter Adalberto Cardoso, was unable to disembark in Los Angeles along with most of the Brazilian athletes and continued to San Francisco with the other members, where he became separated from the rest of the group, disembarked clandestinely and, with 24 hours to go before the competition, traveled the 600km between the two cities on foot and then hitchhiked, only arriving at the Los Angeles Memorial Coliseum 10 minutes before the start of the 10,000m race. Without having slept for more than 18 hours, without having eaten properly and without time to dress properly, Cardoso competed barefoot and finished in last place, but was applauded by the public and won a special medal of honor in recognition of his effort.

In 2004, Vanderlei Cordeiro de Lima was awarded the Pierre de Coubertin medal, a rare honor given by the International Olympic Committee. Until that date, it had been awarded only 9 times.

== Multiple medalists ==
According to official data of the International Olympic Committee, this is a list of all 116 athletes with at least two Olympic medals representing Brazil. The list is sorted by most gold medals, most silver medals, most bronze medals. In case of a tie, the list is in alphabetical order.

Rank	Athlete	Sex	Sport	Gold	Silver	Bronze	Games	Gold medal	Silver medal	Bronze medal	Total
1	Rebeca Andrade	W	Artistic gymnastics	2	3	1	2020 Tokyo	1	1	0	6
1	Rebeca Andrade	W	Artistic gymnastics	2	3	1	2024 Paris	1	2	1	6
2	Robert Scheidt	M	Sailing	2	2	1	1996 Atlanta	1	0	0	5
2	Robert Scheidt	M	Sailing	2	2	1	2000 Sydney	0	1	0	5
2	Robert Scheidt	M	Sailing	2	2	1	2004 Athens	1	0	0	5
2	Robert Scheidt	M	Sailing	2	2	1	2008 Beijing	0	1	0	5
2	Robert Scheidt	M	Sailing	2	2	1	2012 London	0	0	1	5
3	Sérgio Dutra	M	Volleyball	2	2	0	2004 Athens	1	0	0	4
3	Sérgio Dutra	M	Volleyball	2	2	0	2008 Beijing	0	1	0	4
3	Sérgio Dutra	M	Volleyball	2	2	0	2012 London	0	1	0	4
3	Sérgio Dutra	M	Volleyball	2	2	0	2016 Rio de Janeiro	1	0	0	4
4	Torben Grael	M	Sailing	2	1	2	1984 Los Angeles	0	1	0	5
4	Torben Grael	M	Sailing	2	1	2	1988 Seoul	0	0	1	5
4	Torben Grael	M	Sailing	2	1	2	1996 Atlanta	1	0	0	5
4	Torben Grael	M	Sailing	2	1	2	2000 Sydney	0	0	1	5
4	Torben Grael	M	Sailing	2	1	2	2004 Athens	1	0	0	5
5	Marcelo Ferreira	M	Sailing	2	0	1	1996 Atlanta	1	0	0	3
5	Marcelo Ferreira	M	Sailing	2	0	1	2000 Sydney	0	0	1	3
5	Marcelo Ferreira	M	Sailing	2	0	1	2004 Athens	1	0	0	3
5	Thaísa Daher de Menezes	W	Volleyball	2	0	1	2008 Beijing	1	0	0	3
5	Thaísa Daher de Menezes	W	Volleyball	2	0	1	2012 London	1	0	0	3
5	Thaísa Daher de Menezes	W	Volleyball	2	0	1	2024 Paris	0	0	1	3
7	Adhemar Ferreira da Silva	M	Athletics	2	0	0	1952 Helsinki	1	0	0	2
7	Adhemar Ferreira da Silva	M	Athletics	2	0	0	1956 Melbourne	1	0	0	2
7	Fabi Alvim	W	Volleyball	2	0	0	2008 Beijing	1	0	0	2
7	Fabi Alvim	W	Volleyball	2	0	0	2012 London	1	0	0	2
7	Fabiana Claudino	W	Volleyball	2	0	0	2008 Beijing	1	0	0	2
7	Fabiana Claudino	W	Volleyball	2	0	0	2012 London	1	0	0	2
7	Giovane Gávio	M	Volleyball	2	0	0	1992 Barcelona	1	0	0	2
7	Giovane Gávio	M	Volleyball	2	0	0	2004 Athens	1	0	0	2
7	Jaqueline Carvalho	W	Volleyball	2	0	0	2008 Beijing	1	0	0	2
7	Jaqueline Carvalho	W	Volleyball	2	0	0	2012 London	1	0	0	2
7	Kahena Kunze	W	Sailing	2	0	0	2016 Rio de Janeiro	1	0	0	2
7	Kahena Kunze	W	Sailing	2	0	0	2020 Tokyo	1	0	0	2
7	Martine Grael	W	Sailing	2	0	0	2016 Rio de Janeiro	1	0	0	2
7	Martine Grael	W	Sailing	2	0	0	2020 Tokyo	1	0	0	2
7	Maurício Lima	M	Volleyball	2	0	0	1992 Barcelona	1	0	0	2
7	Maurício Lima	M	Volleyball	2	0	0	2004 Athens	1	0	0	2
7	Paula Pequeno	W	Volleyball	2	0	0	2008 Beijing	1	0	0	2
7	Paula Pequeno	W	Volleyball	2	0	0	2012 London	1	0	0	2
7	Sheilla Castro	W	Volleyball	2	0	0	2008 Beijing	1	0	0	2
7	Sheilla Castro	W	Volleyball	2	0	0	2012 London	1	0	0	2
17	Isaquias Queiroz	M	Canoeing	1	3	1	2016 Rio de Janeiro	0	2	1	5
17	Isaquias Queiroz	M	Canoeing	1	3	1	2020 Tokyo	1	0	0	5
17	Isaquias Queiroz	M	Canoeing	1	3	1	2024 Paris	0	1	0	5
18	Bruno Rezende	M	Volleyball	1	2	0	2008 Beijing	0	1	0	3
18	Bruno Rezende	M	Volleyball	1	2	0	2012 London	0	1	0	3
18	Bruno Rezende	M	Volleyball	1	2	0	2016 Rio de Janeiro	1	0	0	3
18	Dante Amaral	M	Volleyball	1	2	0	2004 Athens	1	0	0	3
18	Dante Amaral	M	Volleyball	1	2	0	2008 Beijing	0	1	0	3
18	Dante Amaral	M	Volleyball	1	2	0	2012 London	0	1	0	3
18	Giba Godoy	M	Volleyball	1	2	0	2004 Athens	1	0	0	3
18	Giba Godoy	M	Volleyball	1	2	0	2008 Beijing	0	1	0	3
18	Giba Godoy	M	Volleyball	1	2	0	2012 London	0	1	0	3
18	Rodrigão Santana	M	Volleyball	1	2	0	2004 Athens	1	0	0	3
18	Rodrigão Santana	M	Volleyball	1	2	0	2008 Beijing	0	1	0	3
18	Rodrigão Santana	M	Volleyball	1	2	0	2012 London	0	1	0	3
22	Emanuel Rego	M	Beach volleyball	1	1	1	2004 Athens	1	0	0	3
22	Emanuel Rego	M	Beach volleyball	1	1	1	2008 Beijing	0	0	1	3
22	Emanuel Rego	M	Beach volleyball	1	1	1	2012 London	0	1	0	3
22	Ricardo Santos	M	Beach volleyball	1	1	1	2000 Sydney	0	1	0	3
22	Ricardo Santos	M	Beach volleyball	1	1	1	2004 Athens	1	0	0	3
22	Ricardo Santos	M	Beach volleyball	1	1	1	2008 Beijing	0	0	1	3
24	Alison Cerutti	M	Beach volleyball	1	1	0	2012 London	0	1	0	2
24	Alison Cerutti	M	Beach volleyball	1	1	0	2016 Rio de Janeiro	1	0	0	2
24	Amauri Ribeiro	M	Volleyball	1	1	0	1984 Los Angeles	0	1	0	2
24	Amauri Ribeiro	M	Volleyball	1	1	0	1992 Barcelona	1	0	0	2
24	Anderson Rodrigues	M	Volleyball	1	1	0	2004 Athens	1	0	0	2
24	Anderson Rodrigues	M	Volleyball	1	1	0	2008 Beijing	0	1	0	2
24	André Heller	M	Volleyball	1	1	0	2004 Athens	1	0	0	2
24	André Heller	M	Volleyball	1	1	0	2008 Beijing	0	1	0	2
24	André Nascimento	M	Volleyball	1	1	0	2004 Athens	1	0	0	2
24	André Nascimento	M	Volleyball	1	1	0	2008 Beijing	0	1	0	2
24	Arthur Zanetti	M	Gymnastics	1	1	0	2012 London	1	0	0	2
24	Arthur Zanetti	M	Gymnastics	1	1	0	2016 Rio de Janeiro	0	1	0	2
24	Fernanda Garay	W	Volleyball	1	1	0	2012 London	1	0	0	2
24	Fernanda Garay	W	Volleyball	1	1	0	2020 Tokyo	0	1	0	2
24	Gustavo Endres	M	Volleyball	1	1	0	2004 Athens	1	0	0	2
24	Gustavo Endres	M	Volleyball	1	1	0	2008 Beijing	0	1	0	2
24	Joaquim Cruz	M	Athletics	1	1	0	1984 Los Angeles	1	0	0	2
24	Joaquim Cruz	M	Athletics	1	1	0	1988 Seoul	0	1	0	2
24	Lucão Saatkamp	M	Volleyball	1	1	0	2012 London	0	1	0	2
24	Lucão Saatkamp	M	Volleyball	1	1	0	2016 Rio de Janeiro	1	0	0	2
24	Natália Pereira	W	Volleyball	1	1	0	2012 London	1	0	0	2
24	Natália Pereira	W	Volleyball	1	1	0	2020 Tokyo	0	1	0	2
24	Neymar Júnior	M	Football	1	1	0	2012 London	0	1	0	2
24	Neymar Júnior	M	Football	1	1	0	2016 Rio de Janeiro	1	0	0	2
24	Ricardinho Garcia	M	Volleyball	1	1	0	2004 Athens	1	0	0	2
24	Ricardinho Garcia	M	Volleyball	1	1	0	2012 London	0	1	0	2
24	Tandara Caixeta	W	Volleyball	1	1	0	2012 London	1	0	0	2
24	Tandara Caixeta	W	Volleyball	1	1	0	2020 Tokyo	0	1	0	2
24	Wallace de Souza	M	Volleyball	1	1	0	2012 London	0	1	0	2
24	Wallace de Souza	M	Volleyball	1	1	0	2016 Rio de Janeiro	1	0	0	2
38	César Cielo	M	Swimming	1	0	2	2008 Beijing	1	0	1	3
38	César Cielo	M	Swimming	1	0	2	2012 London	0	0	1	3
38	Hélia Fofão	W	Volleyball	1	0	2	1996 Atlanta	0	0	1	3
38	Hélia Fofão	W	Volleyball	1	0	2	2000 Sydney	0	0	1	3
38	Hélia Fofão	W	Volleyball	1	0	2	2008 Beijing	1	0	0	3
38	Rodrigo Pessoa	M	Equestrian	1	0	2	1996 Atlanta	0	0	1	3
38	Rodrigo Pessoa	M	Equestrian	1	0	2	2000 Sydney	0	0	1	3
38	Rodrigo Pessoa	M	Equestrian	1	0	2	2004 Athens	1	0	0	3
41	Aurélio Miguel	M	Judo	1	0	1	1988 Seoul	1	0	0	2
41	Aurélio Miguel	M	Judo	1	0	1	1996 Atlanta	0	0	1	2
41	Beatriz Souza	W	Judo	1	0	1	2024 Paris	1	0	1	2
41	Guilherme Paraense	M	Shooting	1	0	1	1920 Antwerp	1	0	1	2
41	Rafaela Silva	W	Judo	1	0	1	2016 Rio de Janeiro	1	0	0	2
41	Rafaela Silva	W	Judo	1	0	1	2024 Paris	0	0	1	2
41	Sandra Pires	W	Beach volleyball	1	0	1	1996 Atlanta	1	0	0	2
41	Sandra Pires	W	Beach volleyball	1	0	1	2000 Sydney	0	0	1	2
41	Thiago Braz	M	Athletics	1	0	1	2016 Rio de Janeiro	1	0	0	2
41	Thiago Braz	M	Athletics	1	0	1	2020 Tokyo	0	0	1	2
41	Walewska Oliveira	W	Volleyball	1	0	1	2000 Sydney	0	0	1	2
41	Walewska Oliveira	W	Volleyball	1	0	1	2008 Beijing	1	0	0	2
48	Marta Vieira	W	Football	0	3	0	2004 Athens	0	1	0	3
48	Marta Vieira	W	Football	0	3	0	2008 Beijing	0	1	0	3
48	Marta Vieira	W	Football	0	3	0	2024 Paris	0	1	0	3
49	Gustavo Borges	M	Swimming	0	2	2	1992 Barcelona	0	1	0	4
49	Gustavo Borges	M	Swimming	0	2	2	1996 Atlanta	0	1	1	4
49	Gustavo Borges	M	Swimming	0	2	2	2000 Sydney	0	0	1	4
50	Ademir Roque	M	Football	0	2	0	1984 Los Angeles	0	1	0	2
50	Ademir Roque	M	Football	0	2	0	1988 Seoul	0	1	0	2
50	Adriana Behar	W	Beach volleyball	0	2	0	2000 Sydney	0	1	0	2
50	Adriana Behar	W	Beach volleyball	0	2	0	2004 Athens	0	1	0	2
50	Andréia Suntaque	W	Football	0	2	0	2004 Athens	0	1	0	2
50	Andréia Suntaque	W	Football	0	2	0	2008 Beijing	0	1	0	2
50	Cristiane Rozeira	W	Football	0	2	0	2004 Athens	0	1	0	2
50	Cristiane Rozeira	W	Football	0	2	0	2008 Beijing	0	1	0	2
50	Daniela Alves	W	Football	0	2	0	2004 Athens	0	1	0	2
50	Daniela Alves	W	Football	0	2	0	2008 Beijing	0	1	0	2
50	Delma Pretinha	W	Football	0	2	0	2004 Athens	0	1	0	2
50	Delma Pretinha	W	Football	0	2	0	2008 Beijing	0	1	0	2
50	Luiz Carlos Winck	M	Football	0	2	0	1984 Los Angeles	0	1	0	2
50	Luiz Carlos Winck	M	Football	0	2	0	1988 Seoul	0	1	0	2
50	Maycon Santos	W	Football	0	2	0	2004 Athens	0	1	0	2
50	Maycon Santos	W	Football	0	2	0	2008 Beijing	0	1	0	2
50	Miraíldes Formiga	W	Football	0	2	0	2004 Athens	0	1	0	2
50	Miraíldes Formiga	W	Football	0	2	0	2008 Beijing	0	1	0	2
50	Murilo Endres	M	Volleyball	0	2	0	2008 Beijing	0	1	0	2
50	Murilo Endres	M	Volleyball	0	2	0	2012 London	0	1	0	2
50	Renata Kóki	W	Football	0	2	0	2004 Athens	0	1	0	2
50	Renata Kóki	W	Football	0	2	0	2008 Beijing	0	1	0	2
50	Rosana Augusto	W	Football	0	2	0	2004 Athens	0	1	0	2
50	Rosana Augusto	W	Football	0	2	0	2008 Beijing	0	1	0	2
50	Shelda Bedê	W	Beach volleyball	0	2	0	2000 Sydney	0	1	0	2
50	Shelda Bedê	W	Beach volleyball	0	2	0	2004 Athens	0	1	0	2
50	Tânia Maranhão	W	Football	0	2	0	2004 Athens	0	1	0	2
50	Tânia Maranhão	W	Football	0	2	0	2008 Beijing	0	1	0	2
64	Adriana Santos	W	Basketball	0	1	1	1996 Atlanta	0	1	0	2
64	Adriana Santos	W	Basketball	0	1	1	2000 Sydney	0	0	1	2
64	Adriana Samuel	W	Beach volleyball	0	1	1	1996 Atlanta	0	1	0	2
64	Adriana Samuel	W	Beach volleyball	0	1	1	2000 Sydney	0	0	1	2
64	Afrânio da Costa	M	Shooting	0	1	1	1920 Antwerp	0	1	1	2
64	Alessandra Santos	W	Basketball	0	1	1	1996 Atlanta	0	1	0	2
64	Alessandra Santos	W	Basketball	0	1	1	2000 Sydney	0	0	1	2
64	Alexandre Pato	M	Football	0	1	1	2008 Beijing	0	0	1	2
64	Alexandre Pato	M	Football	0	1	1	2012 London	0	1	0	2
64	Ana Cristina de Souza	F	Volleyball	0	1	1	2020 Tokyo	0	1	0	2
64	Ana Cristina de Souza	F	Volleyball	0	1	1	2024 Paris	0	0	1	2
64	André Domingos	M	Athletics	0	1	1	1996 Atlanta	0	0	1	2
64	André Domingos	M	Athletics	0	1	1	2000 Sydney	0	1	0	2
64	Bebeto Gama	M	Football	0	1	1	1988 Seoul	0	1	0	2
64	Bebeto Gama	M	Football	0	1	1	1996 Atlanta	0	0	1	2
64	Beatriz Ferreira	F	Boxing	0	1	1	2020 Tokyo	0	1	0	2
64	Beatriz Ferreira	F	Boxing	0	1	1	2024 Paris	0	0	1	2
64	Bruno Prada	M	Sailing	0	1	1	2008 Beijing	0	1	0	2
64	Bruno Prada	M	Sailing	0	1	1	2012 London	0	0	1	2
64	Carol Silva	F	Volleyball	0	1	1	2020 Tokyo	0	1	0	2
64	Carol Silva	F	Volleyball	0	1	1	2024 Paris	0	0	1	2
64	Cíntia Tuiú	W	Basketball	0	1	1	1996 Atlanta	0	1	0	2
64	Cíntia Tuiú	W	Basketball	0	1	1	2000 Sydney	0	0	1	2
64	Édson Luciano	M	Athletics	0	1	1	1996 Atlanta	0	0	1	2
64	Édson Luciano	M	Athletics	0	1	1	2000 Sydney	0	1	0	2
64	Gabi Guimarães	F	Volleyball	0	1	1	2020 Tokyo	0	1	0	2
64	Gabi Guimarães	F	Volleyball	0	1	1	2024 Paris	0	0	1	2
64	Janeth Arcain	W	Basketball	0	1	1	1996 Atlanta	0	1	0	2
64	Janeth Arcain	W	Basketball	0	1	1	2000 Sydney	0	0	1	2
64	Macris Carneiro	F	Volleyball	0	1	1	2020 Tokyo	0	1	0	2
64	Macris Carneiro	F	Volleyball	0	1	1	2024 Paris	0	0	1	2
64	Marcelo Vieira	M	Football	0	1	1	2008 Beijing	0	0	1	2
64	Marcelo Vieira	M	Football	0	1	1	2012 London	0	1	0	2
64	Marta Sobral	W	Basketball	0	1	1	1996 Atlanta	0	1	0	2
64	Marta Sobral	W	Basketball	0	1	1	2000 Sydney	0	0	1	2
64	Nélson Prudêncio	M	Athletics	0	1	1	1968 Mexico City	0	1	0	2
64	Nélson Prudêncio	M	Athletics	0	1	1	1972 Munich	0	0	1	2
64	Rayssa Leal	F	Skateboarding	0	1	1	2020 Tokyo	0	1	0	2
64	Rayssa Leal	F	Skateboarding	0	1	1	2024 Paris	0	0	1	2
64	Roberta Ratzke	F	Volleyball	0	1	1	2020 Tokyo	0	1	0	2
64	Roberta Ratzke	F	Volleyball	0	1	1	2024 Paris	0	0	1	2
64	Rosamaria Montibeller	F	Volleyball	0	1	1	2020 Tokyo	0	1	0	2
64	Rosamaria Montibeller	F	Volleyball	0	1	1	2024 Paris	0	0	1	2
64	Silvinha Luz	W	Basketball	0	1	1	1996 Atlanta	0	1	0	2
64	Silvinha Luz	W	Basketball	0	1	1	2000 Sydney	0	0	1	2
64	Tiago Camilo	M	Judo	0	1	1	2000 Sydney	0	1	0	2
64	Tiago Camilo	M	Judo	0	1	1	2008 Beijing	0	0	1	2
64	Thiago Silva	M	Football	0	1	1	2008 Beijing	0	0	1	2
64	Thiago Silva	M	Football	0	1	1	2012 London	0	1	0	2
64	Vicente Lenílson	M	Athletics	0	1	1	2000 Sydney	0	1	0	2
64	Vicente Lenílson	M	Athletics	0	1	1	2008 Beijing	0	0	1	2
64	Willian Lima	M	Judo	0	1	1	2024 Paris	0	1	1	2
91	Mayra Aguiar	W	Judo	0	0	3	2012 London	0	0	1	3
91	Mayra Aguiar	W	Judo	0	0	3	2016 Rio de Janeiro	0	0	1	3
91	Mayra Aguiar	W	Judo	0	0	3	2020 Tokyo	0	0	1	3
91	Rafael Silva	M	Judo	0	0	3	2012 London	0	0	1	3
91	Rafael Silva	M	Judo	0	0	3	2016 Rio de Janeiro	0	0	1	3
91	Rafael Silva	M	Judo	0	0	3	2024 Paris	0	0	1	3
93	Alison dos Santos	M	Athletics	0	0	2	2020 Tokyo	0	0	1	2
93	Alison dos Santos	M	Athletics	0	0	2	2024 Paris	0	0	1	2
93	Álvaro Doda de Miranda Neto	M	Equestrian	0	0	2	1996 Atlanta	0	0	1	2
93	Álvaro Doda de Miranda Neto	M	Equestrian	0	0	2	2000 Sydney	0	0	1	2
93	Amaury Pasos	M	Basketball	0	0	2	1960 Rome	0	0	1	2
93	Amaury Pasos	M	Basketball	0	0	2	1964 Tokyo	0	0	1	2
93	André Johannpeter	M	Equestrian	0	0	2	1996 Atlanta	0	0	1	2
93	André Johannpeter	M	Equestrian	0	0	2	2000 Sydney	0	0	1	2
93	Antônio Sucar	M	Basketball	0	0	2	1960 Rome	0	0	1	2
93	Antônio Sucar	M	Basketball	0	0	2	1964 Tokyo	0	0	1	2
93	Carlos Mosquito	M	Basketball	0	0	2	1960 Rome	0	0	1	2
93	Carlos Mosquito	M	Basketball	0	0	2	1964 Tokyo	0	0	1	2
93	Carmo Rosa Branca	M	Basketball	0	0	2	1960 Rome	0	0	1	2
93	Carmo Rosa Branca	M	Basketball	0	0	2	1964 Tokyo	0	0	1	2
93	Daniel Cargnin	M	Judo	0	0	2	2020 Tokyo	0	0	1	2
93	Daniel Cargnin	M	Judo	0	0	2	2024 Paris	0	0	1	2
93	Édson Bispo	M	Basketball	0	0	2	1960 Rome	0	0	1	2
93	Édson Bispo	M	Basketball	0	0	2	1964 Tokyo	0	0	1	2
93	Fernando Scherer	M	Swimming	0	0	2	1996 Atlanta	0	0	1	2
93	Fernando Scherer	M	Swimming	0	0	2	2000 Sydney	0	0	1	2
93	Jatyr Schall	M	Basketball	0	0	2	1960 Rome	0	0	1	2
93	Jatyr Schall	M	Basketball	0	0	2	1964 Tokyo	0	0	1	2
93	João Carlos de Oliveira	M	Athletics	0	0	2	1976 Montreal	0	0	1	2
93	João Carlos de Oliveira	M	Athletics	0	0	2	1980 Moscow	0	0	1	2
93	Ketleyn Quadros	W	Judo	0	0	2	2008 Beijing	0	0	1	2
93	Ketleyn Quadros	W	Judo	0	0	2	2024 Paris	0	0	1	2
93	Larissa Pimenta	W	Judo	0	0	2	2024 Paris	0	0	2	2
93	Lars Grael	M	Sailing	0	0	2	1988 Seoul	0	0	1	2
93	Lars Grael	M	Sailing	0	0	2	1996 Atlanta	0	0	1	2
93	Leandro Guilheiro	M	Judo	0	0	2	2004 Athens	0	0	1	2
93	Leandro Guilheiro	M	Judo	0	0	2	2008 Beijing	0	0	1	2
93	Leila Barros	W	Volleyball	0	0	2	1996 Atlanta	0	0	1	2
93	Leila Barros	W	Volleyball	0	0	2	2000 Sydney	0	0	1	2
93	Luiz Felipe de Azevedo	M	Equestrian	0	0	2	1996 Atlanta	0	0	1	2
93	Luiz Felipe de Azevedo	M	Equestrian	0	0	2	2000 Sydney	0	0	1	2
93	Reinaldo Conrad	M	Sailing	0	0	2	1968 Mexico City	0	0	1	2
93	Reinaldo Conrad	M	Sailing	0	0	2	1976 Montreal	0	0	1	2
93	Robson Caetano	M	Athletics	0	0	2	1988 Seoul	0	0	1	2
93	Robson Caetano	M	Athletics	0	0	2	1996 Atlanta	0	0	1	2
93	Virna Dias	W	Volleyball	0	0	2	1996 Atlanta	0	0	1	2
93	Virna Dias	W	Volleyball	0	0	2	2000 Sydney	0	0	1	2
93	Wlamir Marques	M	Basketball	0	0	2	1960 Rome	0	0	1	2
93	Wlamir Marques	M	Basketball	0	0	2	1964 Tokyo	0	0	1	2
93	Zenny Algodão	M	Basketball	0	0	2	1948 London	0	0	1	2
93	Zenny Algodão	M	Basketball	0	0	2	1960 Rome	0	0	1	2

== See also ==
- List of Pan American medalists for Brazil
