= Volleyball at the 1984 Summer Olympics – Men's tournament =

Men's volleyball at the Games of the XXIII Olympiad
- Venue: Long Beach Arena
- Date: 29 July – 11 August
- Competitors: 118 from 10 nations

Medalists
1st place, gold medalist(s)		United States (1st title)
2nd place, silver medalist(s)		Brazil
3rd place, bronze medalist(s)		Italy

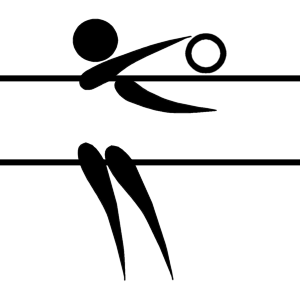

The men's tournament in volleyball at the 1984 Summer Olympics was the 6th edition of the event at the Summer Olympics, organized by the world's governing body, the FIVB in conjunction with the IOC. It was held in Long Beach, California, United States from 29 July to 11 August 1984.

== Qualification ==
Means of qualification	Date	Host	Vacancies	Qualified
Host country	18 May 1978	(Greece) Athens	1	United States
1980 Summer Olympic Games	20 July – 1 August 1980	(Soviet Union) Moscow	1	~~Soviet Union~~; China*
1981 World Cup	19–28 November 1981	Japan	1	~~Cuba~~; Tunisia*
1982 World Championship	1–15 October 1982	Argentina	1	Brazil
1983 African Championship	December 1983	(Egypt) Port Said	1	Egypt
1983 Asian Championship	23 November – 1 December 1983	(Japan) Fukuoka	1	Japan
1983 European Championship	17–25 September 1983	East Germany	1	~~Poland~~; Italy*
1983 NORCECA Championship	13–17 July 1983	(United States) Indianapolis	1	Canada
1983 South American Championship	27–31 July 1983	(Brazil) São Paulo	1	Argentina
World Repechage	4–8 January 1984	(Spain) Barcelona	1	~~Bulgaria~~; South Korea*
Total			10	

* Soviet Union, Cuba, Poland and Bulgaria withdrew because of the Soviet-led boycott and were replaced by China, Tunisia, Italy and South Korea respectively.

== Pools composition ==
Pool A	Pool B
United States (Hosts)	Canada
Argentina	China
Brazil	Egypt
South Korea	Italy
Tunisia	Japan

== Venue ==
All matches
Long Beach, United States
Long Beach Arena
Capacity: 13,609
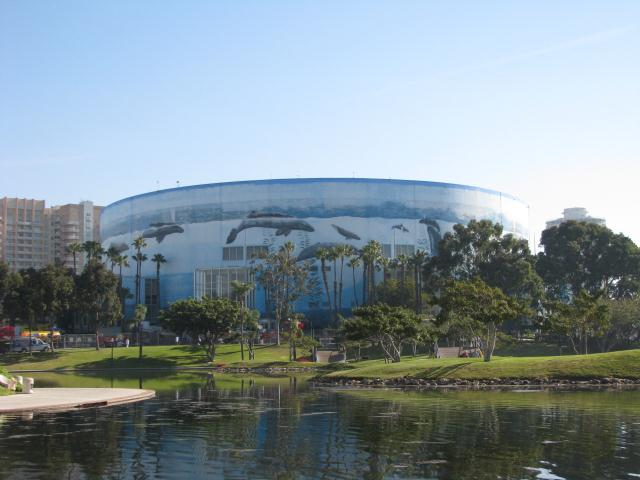

== Preliminary round ==
=== Pool A ===
Pos	Team	Pld	W	L	Pts	SW	SL	SR	SPW	SPL	SPR	Qualification
1	Brazil	4	3	1	7	10	4	2.500	191	144	1.326	Semifinals
2	United States	4	3	1	7	9	4	2.250	168	117	1.436	Semifinals
3	South Korea	4	3	1	7	9	6	1.500	203	162	1.253	5th–8th semifinals
4	Argentina	4	1	3	5	7	9	0.778	184	207	0.889	5th–8th semifinals
5	Tunisia	4	0	4	4	0	12	0.000	64	180	0.356	9th place match

Date		Score		Set 1	Set 2	Set 3	Set 4	Set 5	Total
29 Jul	South Korea	3–0	Tunisia	15–7	15–7	15–7			45–21
29 Jul	United States	3–1	Argentina	15–6	15–7	10–15	15–8		55–36
31 Jul	Brazil	3–1	Argentina	15–8	15–8	16–18	15–13		61–47
31 Jul	United States	3–0	Tunisia	15–3	15–2	15–3			45–8
2 Aug	Brazil	3–0	Tunisia	15–5	15–9	15–2			45–16
2 Aug	United States	3–0	South Korea	15–13	15–9	15–6			45–28
4 Aug	Argentina	3–0	Tunisia	15–9	15–7	15–3			45–19
4 Aug	South Korea	3–1	Brazil	15–4	15–13	13–15	15–8		58–40
6 Aug	South Korea	3–2	Argentina	15–6	14–16	13–15	15–7	15–12	72–56
6 Aug	Brazil	3–0	United States	15–10	15–11	15–2			45–23

=== Pool B ===
Pos	Team	Pld	W	L	Pts	SW	SL	SR	SPW	SPL	SPR	Qualification
1	Canada	4	3	1	7	10	3	3.333	167	122	1.369	Semifinals
2	Italy	4	3	1	7	11	4	2.750	210	143	1.469	Semifinals
3	Japan	4	3	1	7	9	5	1.800	179	162	1.105	5th–8th semifinals
4	China	4	1	3	5	3	9	0.333	124	160	0.775	5th–8th semifinals
5	Egypt	4	0	4	4	0	12	0.000	90	183	0.492	9th place match

Date		Score		Set 1	Set 2	Set 3	Set 4	Set 5	Total
29 Jul	Japan	3–0	China	15–9	15–9	15–8			45–26
29 Jul	Italy	3–1	Canada	10–15	15–4	15–6	15–7		55–32
31 Jul	Canada	3–0	Egypt	15–10	15–9	15–3			45–22
31 Jul	Italy	3–0	China	15–5	16–14	15–13			46–32
2 Aug	China	3–0	Egypt	15–3	15–5	18–16			48–24
2 Aug	Japan	3–2	Italy	5–15	11–15	15–10	15–10	16–14	62–64
4 Aug	Japan	3–0	Egypt	15–6	15–10	15–11			45–27
4 Aug	Canada	3–0	China	15–8	15–7	15–3			45–18
6 Aug	Canada	3–0	Japan	15–10	15–8	15–9			45–27
6 Aug	Italy	3–0	Egypt	15–4	15–7	15–6			45–17

== Final round ==
=== 9th–10th places ===
==== 9th place match ====
Date		Score		Set 1	Set 2	Set 3	Set 4	Set 5	Total
8 Aug	Tunisia	3–2	Egypt	15–13	15–9	5–15	13–15	15–5	63–57

=== 5th–8th places ===
5th–8th semifinals
8 August
South Korea	3
China	1
8 August
Argentina	3
Japan	1

5th place match
10 August
South Korea	3
Argentina	1
7th place match
10 August
China	0
Japan	3

==== 5th–8th semifinals ====
Date		Score		Set 1	Set 2	Set 3	Set 4	Set 5	Total
8 Aug	South Korea	3–1	China	15–4	15–11	6–15	19–17		55–47
8 Aug	Argentina	3–1	Japan	9–15	15–10	15–10	15–11		54–46

==== 7th place match ====
Date		Score		Set 1	Set 2	Set 3	Set 4	Set 5	Total
10 Aug	China	0–3	Japan	14–16	9–15	6–15			29–46

==== 5th place match ====
Date		Score		Set 1	Set 2	Set 3	Set 4	Set 5	Total
10 Aug	South Korea	3–1	Argentina	15–13	9–15	15–9	15–7		54–44

=== Final four ===
Semifinals
8 August
Brazil	3
Italy	1
8 August
United States	3
Canada	0

Gold medal match
11 August
Brazil	0
United States	3
Bronze medal match
11 August
Italy	3
Canada	0

==== Semifinals ====
Date		Score		Set 1	Set 2	Set 3	Set 4	Set 5	Total
8 Aug	Brazil	3–1	Italy	12–15	15–2	15–3	15–5		57–25
8 Aug	United States	3–0	Canada	15–6	15–10	15–7			45–23

==== Bronze medal match ====
Date		Score		Set 1	Set 2	Set 3	Set 4	Set 5	Total
11 Aug	Italy	3–0	Canada	15–11	15–12	15–8			45–31

==== Gold medal match ====
Date		Score		Set 1	Set 2	Set 3	Set 4	Set 5	Total
11 Aug	Brazil	0–3	United States	6–15	6–15	7–15			19–45

== Final standing ==
Rank	Team
1st place, gold medalist(s)	United States
2nd place, silver medalist(s)	Brazil
3rd place, bronze medalist(s)	Italy
4	Canada
5	South Korea
6	Argentina
7	Japan
8	China
9	Tunisia
10	Egypt

1984 Men's Olympic champions

United States
1st title

12–man roster
Dusty Dvorak, Dave Saunders, Steven Salmons, Paul Sunderland, Rich Duwelius, Steve Timmons, Craig Buck, Marc Waldie, Chris Marlowe (c), Aldis Berzins, Patrick Powers, Karch Kiraly
Head coach
Doug Beal

== Medalists ==
Gold	Silver	Bronze
United States Dusty Dvorak; Dave Saunders; Steven Salmons; Paul Sunderland; Rich Duwelius; Steve Timmons; Craig Buck; Marc Waldie; Chris Marlowe (c); Aldis Berzins; Patrick Powers; Karch Kiraly Head coach: Doug Beal	Brazil Bernardo Rezende; Mário Xandó; Antônio Carlos Gueiros Ribeiro; José Montanaro; Rui Nascimento; Renan Dal Zotto; William Silva (c); Amauri Ribeiro; Marcus Vinícius Freire; Domingos Maracanã; Bernard Rajzman; Fernando Ávila Head coach: Bebeto de Freitas	Italy Marco Negri; Pier Paolo Lucchetta; Giancarlo Dametto; Franco Bertoli; Francesco Dall'Olio; Piero Rebaudengo; Giovanni Errichiello; Guido De Luigi; Fabio Vullo; Giovanni Lanfranco; Paolo Vecchi; Andrea Lucchetta Head coach: Silvano Prandi

== Awards ==
- Most valuable player
  (United States) Steve Timmons
- Best scorer
  (South Korea) Kang Man-soo
- Best spiker
  (Brazil) José Montanaro
- Best blocker
  (Argentina) Hugo Conte
- Best server
  (Brazil) José Montanaro
- Best receiver
  (United States) Aldis Berzins

== See also ==
- Volleyball at the Summer Olympics
- Volleyball at the 1984 Summer Olympics – Women's tournament
