= Hélio Silva =

Hélio Silva may refer to:

- Hélio Silva (swimmer)
- Hélio Silva (water polo)
- Hélio da Silva, Brazilian sprinter and triple jumper
