= Fernanda Ferreira (volleyball) =

Brazilian volleyball player (born 1980)

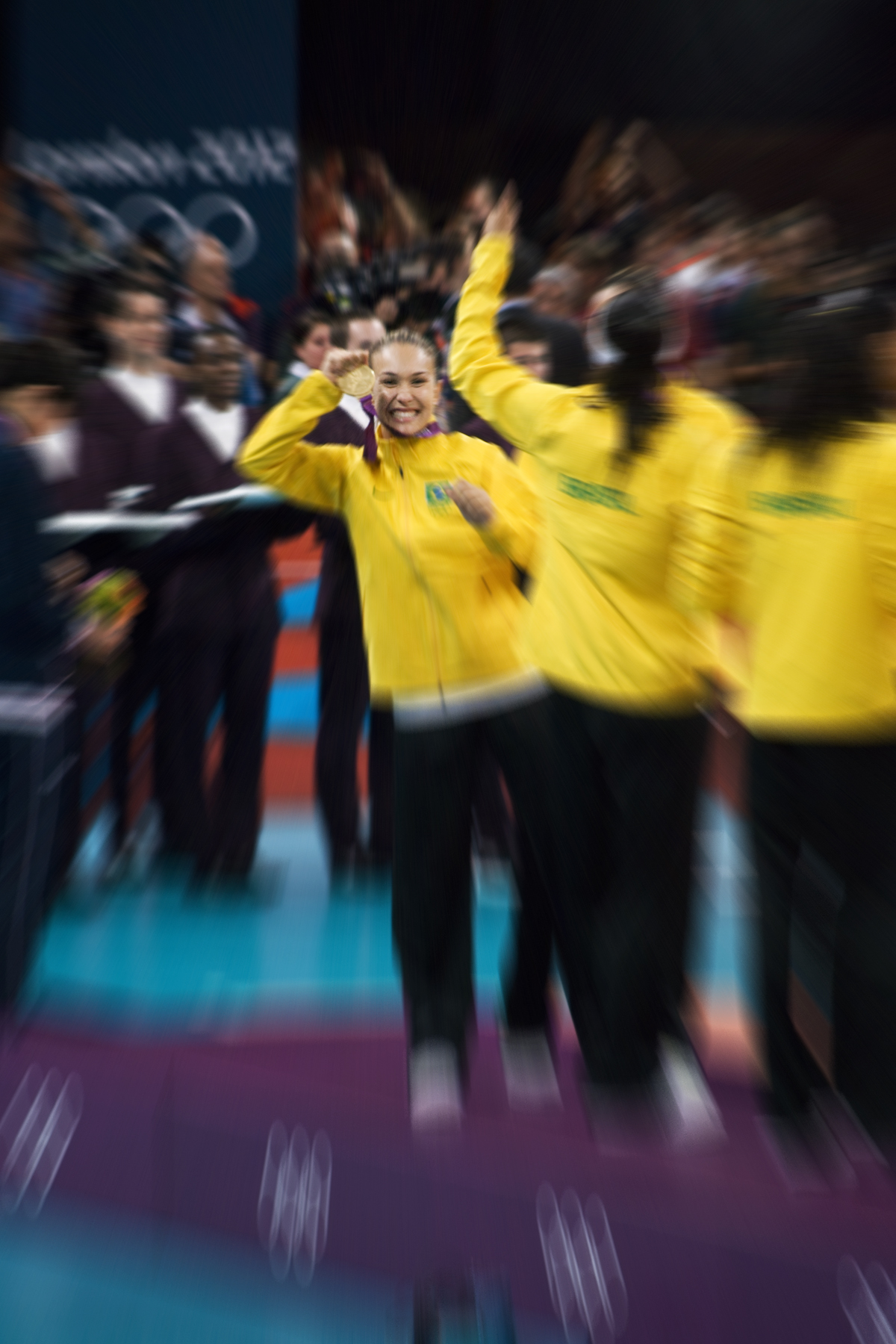
- Fernandinha in 2012

Personal information
- Full name: Fernanda Cristina Ferreira
- Nickname: Fernandinha
- Born: January 10, 1980 (age 46); Rio de Janeiro, Brazil
- Hometown: Rio de Janeiro
- Height: 1.72 m (5 ft 8 in)
- Weight: 66 kg (146 lb)
- Spike: 288 cm (113 in)
- Block: 276 cm (109 in)

Volleyball information
- Position: Setter
- Current club: Retired

National team
2009–2012	Brazil
Medal record
Women's volleyball
Representing Brazil
Olympic Games
Gold medal – first place	2012 London	Team
World Grand Prix
Silver medal – second place	2012 Ningbo	Team

Fernanda Cristina Ferreira (born January 10, 1980), known as Fernandinha, is a Brazilian retired professional volleyball player. She played for the Brazilian national team as a setter. She won a gold medal with the national team at the 2012 Summer Olympics in London, United Kingdom.

== Clubs ==
- (Brazil) Pinheiros (1998–2000)
- (Brazil) São Caetano (2000–2002)
- (Brazil) Paraná Vôlei (2002–2003)
- (Brazil) Pinheiros (2003–2005)
- (Brazil) Brasil Esporte Club (2005–2006)
- (Brazil) Finasa Osasco (2006–2007)
- (Italy) Santeramo Sport (2007–2008)
- (Italy) Busto Arsizio (2008–2010)
- (Italy) Universal Modena (2010–2012)
- (Azerbaijan) Igtisadchi Baku (2012)
- (Brazil) Vôlei Amil Campinas (2012–2013)
- (Brazil) Hinode Barueri (2013–2014)
- (Italy) Pavia Volley (2014–2015)
- (France) Nantes Volley-Ball (2015–2017)
- (Brazil) Clube Curitibano (2017–2018)

== Awards ==
=== Clubs ===
- 2006–07 Brazilian Superliga – Runner-up, with Finasa Osasco
- 2006-07 - Brazilian Superliga
- 2007 - Brazilian Cup
- 2006 - Paulista championship
- 2005 - Open Games of the Interior of São Paulo
- 2005 - Sao Paulo Regional Games
- 2009–10 CEV Cup – Champion, with Yamamay Busto Arsizio

=== Individual ===
- Best setter and best server salompa’s cup 2003
- MVP Bruna Forte Tournament 2007
