= Júlia Bergmann =

Brazilian volleyball player

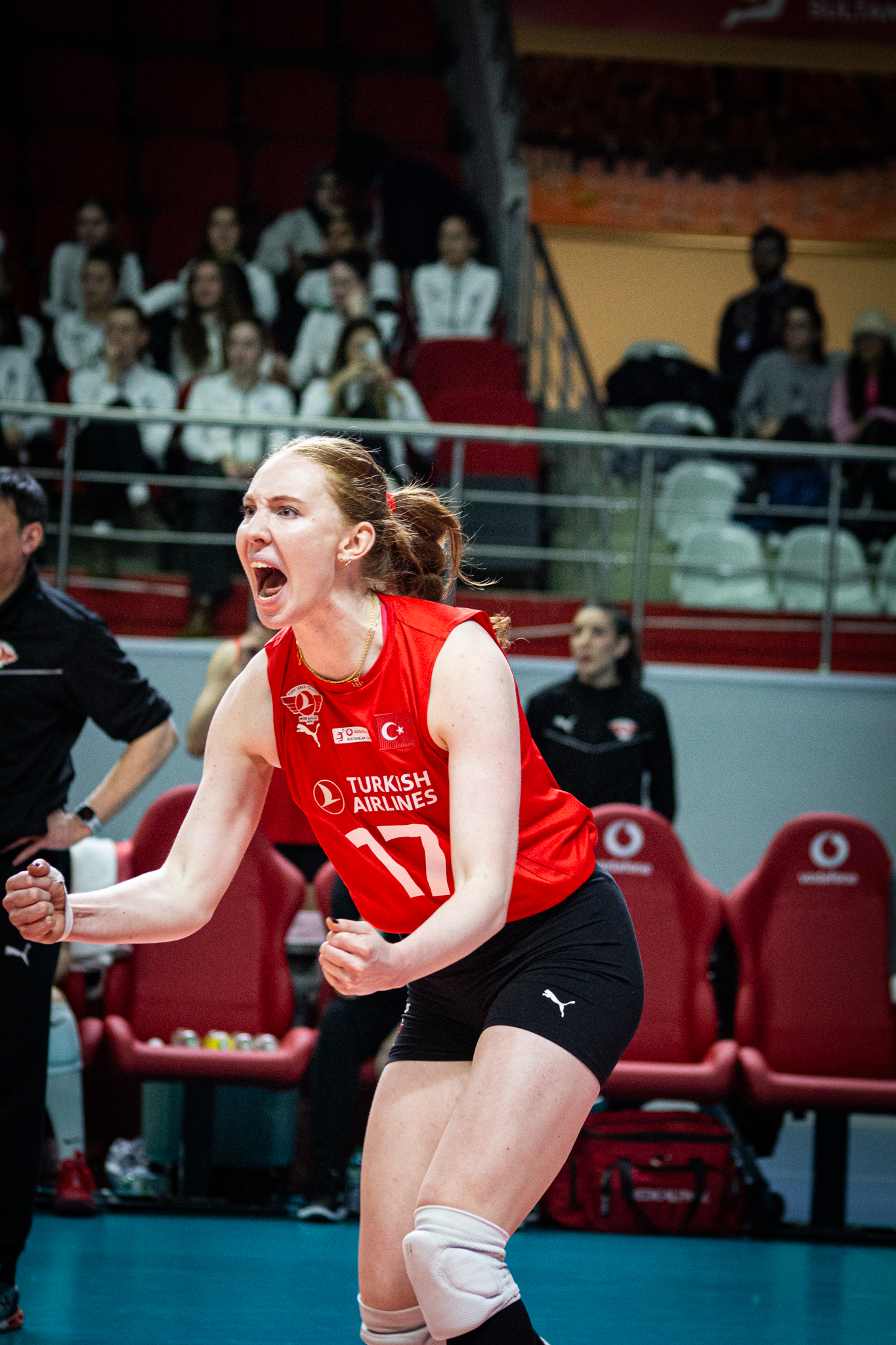
- Bergmann in 2025

Personal information
- Full name: Júlia Isabelle Bergmann
- Nationality: Brazil; Germany
- Born: February 21, 2001 (age 25); Munich, Germany
- Hometown: Toledo, Brazil
- Height: 191 cm (6 ft 3 in)
- Weight: 83 kg (183 lb)
- Spike: 310 cm (122 in)
- Block: 295 cm (116 in)
- Education: Georgia Tech

Volleyball information
- Position: Outside hitter
- Current club: Savino del bene Scandicci
- Number: 17

Career
Years	Teams
2015–2016	(Brazil) Avotol/Toledo
2016–2018	(Brazil) Brusque
2019–2022	(United States) Georgia Tech
2023–2026	(Turkey) Türk Hava Yolları
2026-	(Italy) Savino del bene Scandicci

National team
2019, 2022-	Brazil
Honours
Women's Volleyball
Representing Brazil
Olympic Games
Bronze medal – third place	2024 Paris	Team
FIVB World Championship
Bronze medal – third place	2025 Thailand	Team
FIVB Nation's League
Silver medal – second place	2019 Nanjing	Team
Silver medal – second place	2022 Ankara	Team
Silver medal – second place	2025 Łódź	Team
Silver medal – second place	2026 Macau
South American Championship
Gold medal – first place	2023 Recife	Team
Gold medal – first place	2026 Rio de Janeiro	Team

Júlia Isabelle Bergmann ( Brazilian Portuguese: [ˈʒuliɐ izaˈbɛli beʁɡˈmɐ̃n], German pronunciation: [ˈjuːli̯a ʔizaˈbɛlə ˈbɛʁkman]; born February 21, 2001) is a German-born Brazilian volleyball player who plays as an outside hitter for the Brazil women's national volleyball team since 2019. She is the sister of Brazil men's national volleyball team player, Lukas Bergmann.

== Early life ==
Bergmann was born in Munich, Germany to a Brazilian mother and German father. She and her family moved to Brusque, Brazil in 2011 when she was in the fourth grade. She said her parents decided to move the family to Brazil so she and her brother could experience another country with a different culture, learn the language, and learn how to adapt with different people. She is fluent in German, Portuguese, and English.

Both of her parents played volleyball, so she began taking up the sport in fifth grade. After two years of playing volleyball, she began representing her city in high level tournaments. Bergmann opted to attend college in the United States at Georgia Tech, something she knew she wanted to do from a young age in order to play volleyball and study physics.

== Career ==
=== College ===
Bergmann joined the Georgia Tech Yellow Jackets volleyball team in 2019. As a freshman, she led the team in kills and was named Atlantic Coast Conference Freshman of the Year.

As a junior in 2021, Bergmann helped the team to the 2021 NCAA tournament final eight, the first time the team got to that round in 18 years. She was named an AVCA First Team All-American and ACC Player of the Year in 2021. She finished the regular season 12th in the NCAA in points (577.5) and 13th in the country in kills (497), both stats which led the ACC.

=== Professional clubs ===
- (Brazil) Avotol/Toledo (2015–2016)
- (Brazil) Brusque (2016–2018)
- (Turkey) THY Turkish Airlines (2023–2026)
- (Italy) Savino del bene Scandicci (2026-)

=== Brazil national team ===
Bergmann could have played for either the Brazilian or German national team. She chose to join Brazil's nation team while still in college, she made her Brazilian national team debut at the 2019 Women's Nations League tournament, earning a silver medal with the team, and also participated in the 2019 Pan American Games.

In May 2022, Bergmann was named to the 25-player roster for the 2022 FIVB Volleyball Nations League tournament. In her debut as a starting outside hitter for the national team, she was the highest scorer in kills in their defeat of Germany.

She represented Brazil at the 2024 Summer Olympics and won a bronze medal in the women's tournament.

== Awards and honors ==
=== Clubs ===
- 2017-2018 Catarinense Championship – Silver medal, with Brusque.
- 2016-2017 Brazilian Superliga B – Bronze medal, with Brusque.
- 2016-2017 Taça Prata – Gold medal, with Brusque.

=== International ===
- 2025 FIVB World Championship - Bronze medal, with Brazilian national team.
- 2025 FIVB Nations League – Silver medal, with Brazilian national team.
- 2024 Olympic Games – Bronze medal, with Brazilian national team.
- 2022 FIVB Nations League – Silver medal, with Brazilian national team.
- 2019 FIVB Nations League – Silver medal, with Brazilian national team.

=== College ===
- 2022 AVCA Second Team All-American
- 2022 All-ACC First Team
- 2021 AVCA First Team All-American
- 2021 Volleyball Magazine First Team All-American
- 2020 AVCA All-America Honorable Mention
- 2020 All-ACC First Team
- 2019 ACC Freshman of the Year
- 2019 AVCA Regional Freshman of the Year
- 2019 First Team All-ACC
- 2019 ACC All-Freshman Team
