= Ricardo Tonieto =

Brazilian water polo player

Personal information
- Born: 22 March 1962 (age 63); São Paulo, Brazil

Sport
- Sport: Water polo

Ricardo Tonieto (born 22 March 1962) is a Brazilian water polo player. He competed in the men's tournament at the 1984 Summer Olympics.
