= Orlando Chaves (water polo) =

Brazilian water polo player

Personal information
- Born: 5 February 1963 (age 62); Rio de Janeiro, Brazil

Sport
- Sport: Water polo

Orlando Chaves (born 5 February 1963) is a Brazilian water polo player. He competed in the men's tournament at the 1984 Summer Olympics.
