= Marcus Temke =

Brazilian sailor

Personal information
- Born: 26 March 1962 (age 63); São Paulo, Brazil

Sport
- Sport: Sailing

Marcus Temke (born 26 March 1962) is a Brazilian sailor. He competed at the 1984 Summer Olympics, the 1988 Summer Olympics, and the 1992 Summer Olympics.
