= Pinga (footballer, born 1965) =

Brazilian footballer

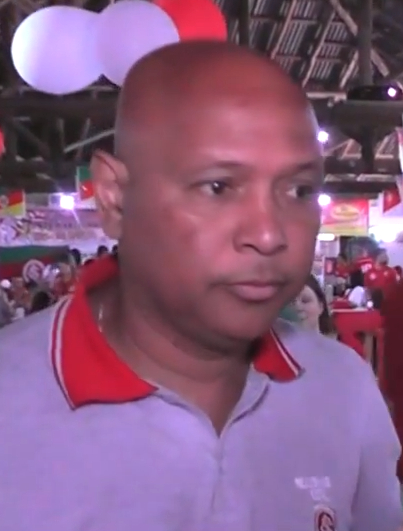

Personal information
- Full name: Jorge Luís da Silva Brum
- Date of birth: 23 April 1965 (age 61)
- Place of birth: Porto Alegre, Brazil
- Height: 1.81 m (5 ft 11 in)
- Position: Defender

Senior career*
Years	Team	Apps	(Gls)
1984–1991	Internacional		
1991	Ituano		
1991–1993	Internacional		
1993	Rio Branco (SP)		
1994	Corinthians		
1995	América (SP)		
1996	Londrina		
1997	Brasil de Pelotas		
1999	Paysandu		
1999	Sapiranga		
1999	Fortaleza		
2000	Serrano		

International career^{‡}
1984	Brazil U23	27	(18)
Medal record
Representing Brazil
Men's Football
Silver medal – second place	1984 Los Angeles	Team competition
- * Club domestic league appearances and goals ‡ National team caps and goals as of 6 February 2013

Jorge Luis da Silva Brum, best known as Pinga (born 30 April 1965, in Porto Alegre), is a Brazilian former footballer who played as a defender either in the centre, or as a full-back.

Throughout his career (1984–2000) he played with Sport Club Internacional, Ituano, Corinthians, Rio Branco, Londrina, América (SP), Fortaleza, Paysandu and Serrano (RJ). He won three Campeonato Rio Grande do Sul titles (1984, 1991, 1992), two Brazilian Cups (1992, 1995) and one São Paulo State Championship. With the Brazilian Olympic Team he won a silver medal at the 1984 Summer Olympics.
