= Solon dos Santos =

Brazilian water polo player

Personal information
- Born: 23 January 1961 (age 65) Rio de Janeiro, Brazil

Sport
- Sport: Water polo

Solon dos Santos (born 23 January 1961) is a Brazilian water polo player. He competed in the men's tournament at the 1984 Summer Olympics.
