= Glenn Haynes =

Brazilian sailor

Personal information
- Nationality: Brazilian
- Born: 5 September 1960 (age 64)

Sport
- Country: Brazil
- Sport: Sailing

Glenn Haynes (born 5 September 1960) is a Brazilian sailor.

He participated at the 1984 Summer Olympics in Los Angeles, where he placed seventh in the multihull class, together with Lars Grael.
