= Elisângela Oliveira =

Brazilian volleyball player

Personal information
- Full name: Elisângela Almeida de Oliveira
- Born: 30 October 1978 (age 47); Londrina, Paraná, Brazil
- Height: 1.84 m (6 ft 0 in)
- Weight: 81 kg (179 lb)
- Spike: 302 cm (119 in)
- Block: 282 cm (111 in)

Volleyball information
- Position: Opposite spiker
- Current club: Retired

National team
1999–2004	Brazil
Honours
Women's volleyball
Representing Brazil
Olympic Games
Bronze medal – third place	2000 Sydney	Team
World Cup
Bronze medal – third place	1999 Japan
World Grand Prix
Gold medal – first place	2004 Reggio Calabria	Team
Silver medal – second place	1999 Yu Xi	Team
Bronze medal – third place	2000 Quezon City
Pan American Games
Gold medal – first place	1999 Winnipeg	Team

Elisângela Almeida de Oliveira (born 30 October 1978) is a Brazilian former volleyball player.

She participated at the 1999 FIVB Volleyball Women's World Cup. She competed for Brazil at the 2000 Olympic Games, winning a bronze medal. She claimed the gold medal with the Women's National Team at the 1999 Pan American Games. She also competed at the 2004 Summer Olympics in Athens, Greece. She was champion of the South American Youth Championship in 1996 and 1999, won three medals at the Grand Prix, and won the gold medal at the Pan Winnipeg in 1999, .

== Career ==
She began her volleyball career at 15 years old. She joined the Brazilian national team in 1996 and won a medal in the South American Youth Championship. The next year she competed in Brazilian Superliga Women's Volleyball, and her team finished in eighth place. In 1999 she joined the adult national team; she was 21 years old. That year her team competed in the BCV CUP, finishing in fourth place. Her team won the bronze medal in the Grand Prix and the Olympics the following year. Oliveira's team also won the bronze medal in the 2000 Olympics, after which she joined another volleyball team. Joining the club was controversial as she was five months pregnant. On 17 May 2005 her son, Lorenzo, was born. Only two months later, she began training again.

== Clubs ==
- (Brazil) Paraná Vôlei (1998–2001)
- (Brazil) Minas Tênis Clube (2001–2003)
- (Brazil) Paraná Vôlei (2003–2004)
- (Italy) Santeramo (2004–2005)
- (Brazil) Macaé (2005–2007)
- (Brazil) Finasa Osasco (2007–2008)
- (Brazil) Brusque (2008–2009)
- (Japan) Hisamitsu Springs (2009–2011)
- (Brazil) SESI-SP (2011–2013)
- (Brazil) Brasília Vôlei (2013–2015)
- (Brazil) São Bernardo (2015–2016)

== Awards ==
=== Individuals ===
- 2005–06 Brazilian Superliga – "Best Server"
- 2008–09 Brazilian Superliga – "Best Server"
- 2010–11 Japanese V-League – "Best Server"
