= William Silva (volleyball) =

Brazilian volleyball player (born 1954)

William
Personal information
- Born: William Carvalho da Silva; 16 November 1954 (age 71) São Paulo, Brazil
- Height: 1.85 m (6 ft 1 in)

Volleyball information
- Position: Setter
- Number: 7

National team
- Years: Team
- 1975–1988: Brazil
Medal record
Men's volleyball
Representing Brazil
Olympic Games
Silver medal – second place	1984 Los Angeles	Team
World Championship
Silver medal – second place	1982 Argentina
FIVB World Cup
Bronze medal – third place	1981 Japan
Pan American Games
Gold medal – first place	1983 Caracas	Team
Silver medal – second place	1975 Mexico City	Team
Silver medal – second place	1979 Caguas	Team
CSV South American Championship
Gold medal – first place	1981 Santiago
Gold medal – first place	1983 São Paulo

William Carvalho da Silva (born 16 November 1954), more commonly known as William, is a Brazilian former volleyball player who competed in the 1976, 1980, 1984, and the 1988 Summer Olympics. William was the captain of the Brazilian team in the 1980s. He was a setter.

He was born in São Paulo.

In 1976, William was part of the Brazilian team that finished seventh in the Olympic tournament in Montreal.

In 1980, he finished fifth with the Brazilian team in the Olympic tournament in Moscow.

In 1984, William was a member of the Brazilian team that won the silver medal in the Olympic tournament in Los Angeles.

In 1988, his final Olympic appearance, Willian finished fourth with the Brazilian team in the Olympic tournament in Seoul.
