= Mario Sérgio Lotufo =

Brazilian water polo player

Personal information
- Born: 14 February 1960 (age 65); São Paulo, Brazil

Sport
- Sport: Water polo

Mario Sérgio Lotufo (born 14 February 1960) is a Brazilian water polo player. He competed in the men's tournament at the 1984 Summer Olympics.
