= Paulo Santos (Brazilian footballer) =

Brazilian footballer

Personal information
- Full name: Paulo dos Santos
- Date of birth: 14 April 1960 (age 66)
- Place of birth: Porto Alegre, Brazil
- Position: Midfielder

Youth career
- Internacional

Senior career*
Years	Team	Apps	(Gls)
1981–1985	Internacional		
1982–1983	→ Criciúma (loan)		
1986	Ferroviária		
1987	America-RJ		
1988–1989	Glória		
1990	Marcílio Dias		
1991	Passo Fundo		
1992	Caxias		
1992	Brasil de Farroupilha		
1993–1994	Palmeirense		
1998	Cruzeiro-RS		

International career
1984	Brazil Olympic	1	(0)
Medal record
Men's Football
Representing Brazil
Silver medal – second place	1984 Los Angeles	Team
- * Club domestic league appearances and goals

Paulo dos Santos (born 14 April 1960) is a Brazilian former footballer who played as a midfielder. He competed in the 1984 Summer Olympics with the Brazil national football team.

== Honours ==
Internacional

- Torneio Heleno Nunes: 1984

Brazil Olympic

- Olympic Games: (silver) 1984
