= Rui Nascimento =

Brazilian volleyball player (born 1960)

Rui Campos do Nascimento
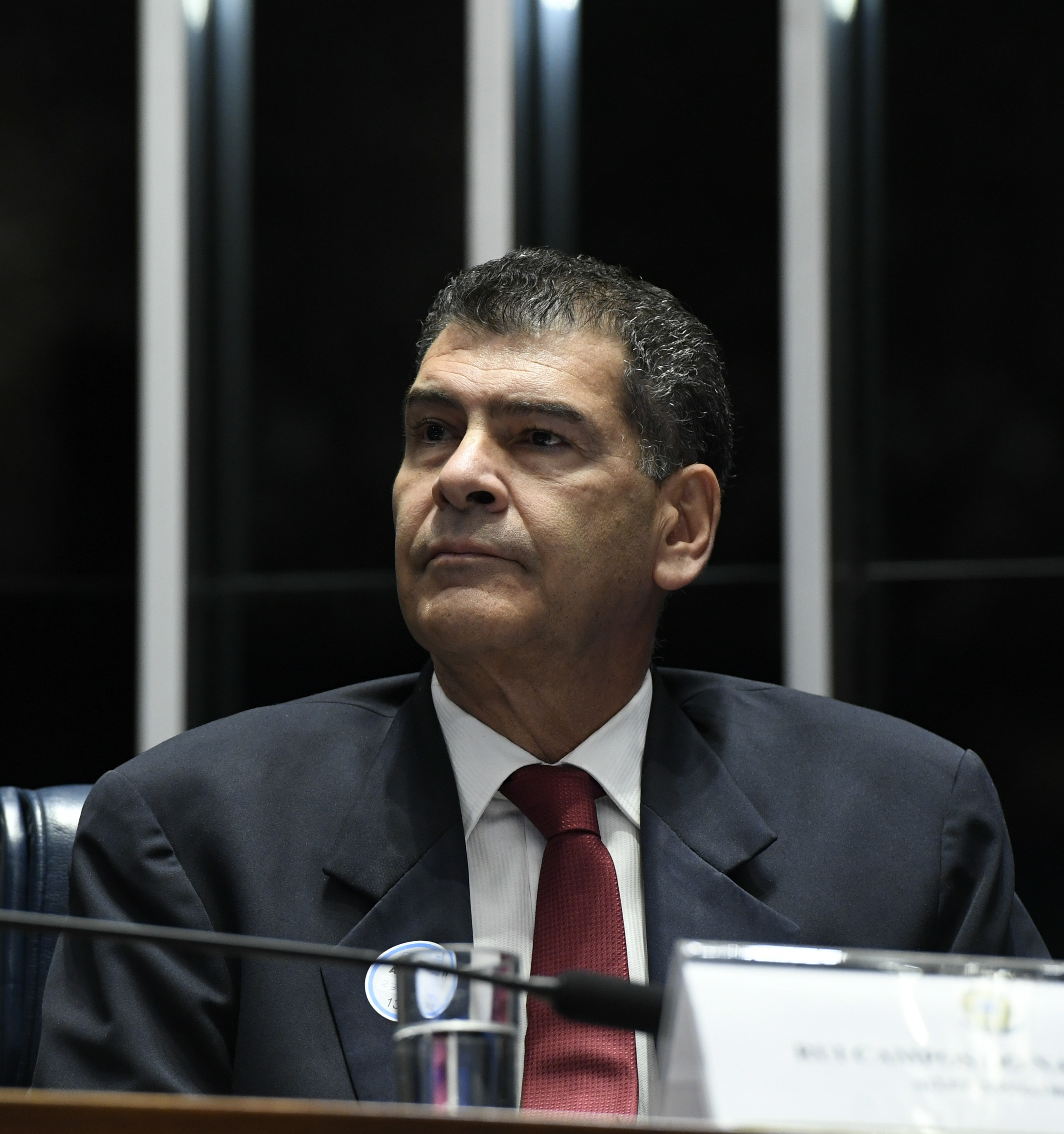

Personal information
- Born: 23 September 1960 (age 66); Rio de Janeiro, Rio de Janeiro, Brazil
- Height: 1.94 m (6 ft 4 in)

Volleyball information
- Position: Middle blocker
- Number: 5

National team
1981–1986	Brazil
Honours
Men's volleyball
Representing Brazil
Olympic Games
Silver medal – second place	1984 Los Angeles	Team
World Championship
Silver medal – second place	1982 Argentina
Pan American Games
Gold medal – first place	1983 Caracas	Team
CSV South American Championship
Gold medal – first place	1981 Santiago
Gold medal – first place	1983 São Paulo

Rui Campos do Nascimento (born 23 September 1960), known as Rui, is a Brazilian former volleyball player who competed in the 1984 Summer Olympics in Los Angeles.

In 1984, he was part of the Brazilian team which won the silver medal in the Olympic tournament. He played two matches.
