= Badalhoca =

Brazilian volleyball player (born 1957)

Antônio Carlos Gueiros Ribeiro

Personal information
- Nickname: Badalhoca
- Born: 5 October 1957 (age 69); Rio de Janeiro, Brazil
- Height: 1.93 m (6 ft 4 in)

Volleyball information
- Position: Outside hitter
- Number: 3

National team
1979–1984	Brazil
Honours
Men's volleyball
Representing Brazil
Olympic Games
Silver medal – second place	1984 Los Angeles	Team
Pan American Games
Gold medal – first place	1983 Caracas	Team
Silver medal – second place	1979 Caguas	Team
CSV South American Championship
Gold medal – first place	1983 São Paulo

Antônio Carlos Gueiros Ribeiro (born 5 October 1957), known as Badalhoca, is a Brazilian former volleyball player who competed in the 1980 Summer Olympics and in the 1984 Summer Olympics.

In 1980 he was part of the Brazilian team which finished fifth in the Olympic tournament. He played two matches.

Four years later he won the silver medal with the Brazilian team in the 1984 Olympic tournament. He played five matches.
