= Luís Henrique (footballer, born 1960) =

Brazilian footballer

Personal information
- Full name: Luís Henrique Dias
- Date of birth: 18 May 1960 (age 66)
- Place of birth: Iracemápolis, Brazil
- Position: Goalkeeper

Senior career*
Years	Team	Apps	(Gls)
1982–1983	Botafogo-SP		
1983–1984	Ponte Preta		
1985–1988	Criciúma		
1988–1990	São José		
1990–1991	Coritiba		
1992	Rio Branco-SP		
1992	Paraná		
1993	Atlético Mineiro		
1993	União São João		
1994	Santo André		

International career
1979–1984	Brazil		
Medal record
Men's Football
Representing Brazil
Olympics
Silver medal – second place	1984 Los Angeles	Team
Pan American Games
Gold medal – first place	1979 San Juan
- * Club domestic league appearances and goals

Luís Henrique Dias (born 18 May 1960) is a Brazilian former footballer who played as a goalkeeper. He competed in the 1984 Summer Olympics with the Brazil national football team.
