= Chicão (footballer, born 1962) =

Brazilian footballer

Personal information
- Full name: Francisco Carlos Martins Vidal
- Date of birth: 4 September 1962 (age 64)
- Place of birth: Rio Brilhante, Mato Grosso do Sul, Brazil
- Position: Forward

Senior career*
Years	Team	Apps	(Gls)
1981–1986	Ponte Preta		
1987–1988	Santos		
1988–1991	Coritiba		
1991–1992	Botafogo		
1992	Santa Cruz		
1992–1993	Bragantino		
1994	Remo		
1995	Portuguesa		

International career
- Brazil U23
Medal record
Men's football
Representing Brazil
Olympic Games
Silver medal – second place	1984 Los Angeles	Team
- * Club domestic league appearances and goals

Francisco Carlos Martins Vidal (born 4 September 1962), known as Chicão, is a Brazilian former footballer who played as a forward. He competed in the 1984 Summer Olympics with the Brazil national under-23 football team.

== Honours ==
Ponte Preta

- Copa São Paulo de Futebol Jr.: 1981, 1982

Brazil Olympic

- Olympics: (silver) Silver medal (1984)
