= Xandó =

Brazilian volleyball player (born 1961)

Mário Xandó de Oliveira Neto
Personal information
- Born: 31 July 1961 (age 65) Poços de Caldas, Minas Gerais, Brazil
- Height: 1.93 m (6 ft 4 in)

Volleyball information
- Position: Opposite
- Number: 2

National team
- Years: Team
- 1979–1987: Brazil
Honours
Men's volleyball
Representing Brazil
Olympic Games
| Silver medal – second place | 1984 Los Angeles | Team |
World Championship
| Silver medal – second place | 1982 Argentina |
FIVB World Cup
| Bronze medal – third place | 1981 Japan |
Pan American Games
| Gold medal – first place | 1983 Caracas | Team |
| Silver medal – second place | 1979 Caguas | Team |
| Bronze medal – third place | 1987 Indianapolis | Team |
CSV South American Championship
| Gold medal – first place | 1981 Santiago |
| Gold medal – first place | 1983 São Paulo |

Mário Xandó de Oliveira Neto (born 31 July 1961), known as Xandó, is a Brazilian former volleyball player who won a silver medal at the 1984 Summer Olympics in Los Angeles. Xandó also competed at the 1980 Summer Olympics in Moscow. He won a silver medal at the 1982 FIVB World Championship in Argentina.

Xandó won a silver medal at the 1979 Pan American Games in Caguas, a gold medal at the 1983 Pan American Games in Caracas, and a bronze medal at the 1987 Pan American Games in Indianapolis.
