= Amauri Ribeiro =

Brazilian volleyball player

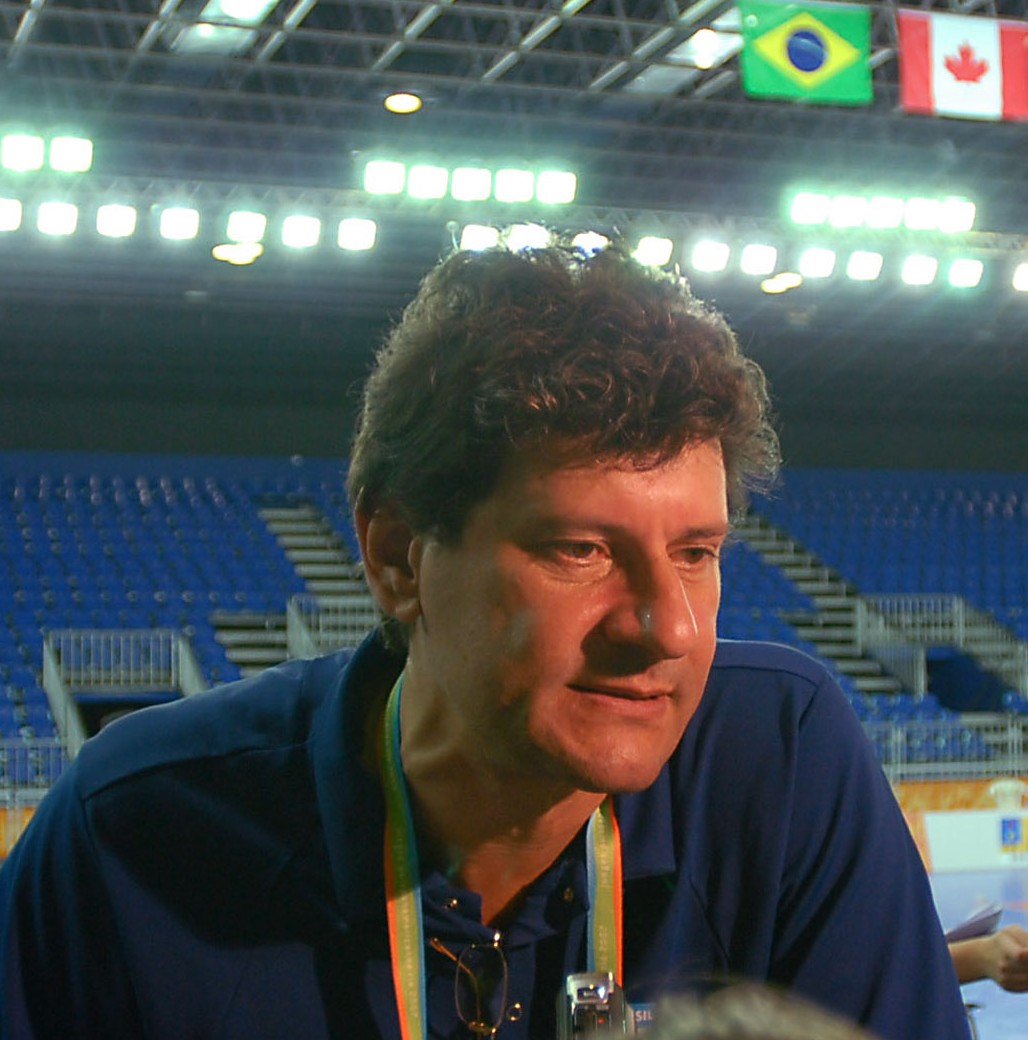
- Amauri Ribeiro in 2007

Personal information
- Born: January 23, 1959 (age 67); São Paulo, Brazil
- Height: 1.98 m (6 ft 6 in)

Volleyball information
- Position: Middle blocker
- Number: 8 (1980–1988); 15 (1992)

National team
1980–1992	Brazil
Honours
Men's volleyball
Representing Brazil
Olympic Games
Gold medal – first place	1992 Barcelona	Team
Silver medal – second place	1984 Los Angeles	Team
World Championship
Silver medal – second place	1982 Argentina
FIVB World Cup
Bronze medal – third place	1981 Japan
Pan American Games
Gold medal – first place	1983 Caracas	Team
CSV South American Championship
Gold medal – first place	1981 Santiago
Gold medal – first place	1983 São Paulo

Amauri Ribeiro (born January 23, 1959), known as Amauri, is a Brazilian former volleyball player who competed at the 1980, 1984, 1988, and the 1992 Summer Olympics.

In 1980, Amauri was part of the Brazilian team that finished fifth at the Olympic tournament in Moscow. He played all six matches. In 1984, Amauri won the silver medal at the Olympic tournament in Los Angeles. He played five matches. In 1988, Amauri finished fourth at the Olympic tournament in Seoul. He played all seven matches. Amauri's final Olympic appearance was at the Olympic tournament in Barcelona, where he won the gold medal. He played two matches.

Amauri won a silver medal at the 1982 FIVB World Championship in Argentina and a gold medal at the 1983 Pan American Games in Caracas.
