= José Montanaro =

Brazilian volleyball player (born 1958)

José Montanaro Junior

Personal information
- Born: 29 July 1958 (age 68); São Paulo, São Paulo, Brazil
- Height: 1.87 m (6 ft 2 in)

Volleyball information
- Position: Outside hitter
- Number: 4

National team
1979–1988	Brazil
Honours
Men's volleyball
Representing Brazil
Olympic Games
Silver medal – second place	1984 Los Angeles	Team
World Championship
Silver medal – second place	1982 Argentina
FIVB World Cup
Bronze medal – third place	1981 Japan
Pan American Games
Silver medal – second place	1979 Caguas	Team
CSV South American Championship
Gold medal – first place	1979 Rosario
Gold medal – first place	1981 Santiago
Gold medal – first place	1983 São Paulo

José Montanaro Junior (born 29 July 1958), known as Montanaro, is a Brazilian former volleyball player who competed in the 1980 Summer Olympics, the 1984 Summer Olympics, and the 1988 Summer Olympics.

In 1980, Montanaro was part of the Brazilian team that finished fifth in the Olympic tournament. He played five matches.

Four years later, Montanaro won the silver medal with the Brazilian team in the 1984 Olympic tournament. He played all six matches.

Montanaro was a member of the Brazilian team that finished fourth in the 1988 Olympic tournament. He played all seven matches.
