= Fernando Ávila =

Brazilian volleyball player (born 1955)

Fernando Roscio de Ávila

Personal information
- Full name: Fernando Roscio de Ávila
- Nickname: Fernandão
- Born: 8 February 1955 (age 71); Rio de Janeiro, Rio de Janeiro, Brazil
- Height: 1.99 m (6 ft 6 in)

Volleyball information
- Position: Outside hitter
- Number: 11 (1976); 14 (1984)

National team
1975–1984	Brazil
Honours
Men's volleyball
Representing Brazil
Olympic Games
Silver medal – second place	1984 Los Angeles	Team
World Championship
Silver medal – second place	1982 Argentina
Pan American Games
Gold medal – first place	1983 Caracas	Team
Silver medal – second place	1975 Mexico City	Team
CSV South American Championship
Gold medal – first place	1983 São Paulo

Fernando Roscio de Ávila (born 8 February 1955), known as Fernandão, is a Brazilian former volleyball player who competed in the 1976 Summer Olympics and in the 1984 Summer Olympics.

In 1976, he was part of the Brazilian team that finished seventh in the Olympic tournament. He played all five matches.

Eight years later, he won the silver medal with the Brazilian team in the 1984 Olympic tournament. He played all six matches.
