= Associação Desportiva Brusque =

Brazilian volleyball club

- League: Superliga Feminina
- Based in: Brusque
- Head coach: Mauricio Thomas

Associação Desportiva Brusque is a women's volleyball team, based in Brusque, Santa Catarina (state), Brazil. The team was sponsored by Brazil Telecom.

== 2005/2006 Team ==
In 2005, Tandara Caixeta played with Associação Desportiva Brusque.

== 2007/2008 Team ==
Name	Height	Position
Camila Adao	172	Setter
Fabiola Sousa	184	Setter
Juzinha	180	Wing-Spiker
Veronica	183	Wing-Spiker
Joyce	182	Wing-Spiker
Ju Costa	184	Wing-Spiker
Thais	172	Wing-Spiker
Renata	187	Middle-Blocker
Juciely	184	Middle-Blocker
Daniela	187	Middle-Blocker
Natalia	184	Middle-Blocker
Elisângela Oliveira	184	Opposite
Marcela	171	Libero
