= Kita (footballer) =

Brazilian footballer

Personal information
- Full name: João Leithardt Neto
- Date of birth: 6 January 1958
- Place of birth: Passo Fundo, Brazil
- Date of death: 3 October 2015 (aged 57)
- Place of death: Passo Fundo, Brazil
- Position: Forward

Senior career*
Years	Team	Apps	(Gls)
- Internacional

International career
1984	Brazil	4	(0)
Medal record
Men's Football
Representing Brazil
Silver medal – second place	1984 Los Angeles	Team
- * Club domestic league appearances and goals

João Leithardt Neto (6 January 1958 – 3 October 2015), nicknamed Kita, was a Brazilian footballer who played as a forward. He competed in the 1984 Summer Olympics with the Brazil national football team.

Kita died on 3 October 2015 at the age of 57 due to a generalized infection aggravated by liver cancer.
