= Hélio Silva (water polo) =

Brazilian water polo player (born 1962)

Personal information
- Full name: Hélio Frederico Gomes da Silva
- Born: 9 February 1962 (age 64) Rio de Janeiro, Brazil
- Height: 183 cm (6 ft 0 in)
- Weight: 79 kg (174 lb)

Sport
- Sport: Water polo

Hélio Frederico Gomes da Silva (Note: This name uses Portuguese naming customs: the first or maternal family name is Gomes and the second or paternal family name is Silva.) (born 9 February 1962) is a Brazilian water polo player. He competed in the men's tournament at the 1984 Summer Olympics.
