= Ronaldo Moraes =

Brazilian footballer

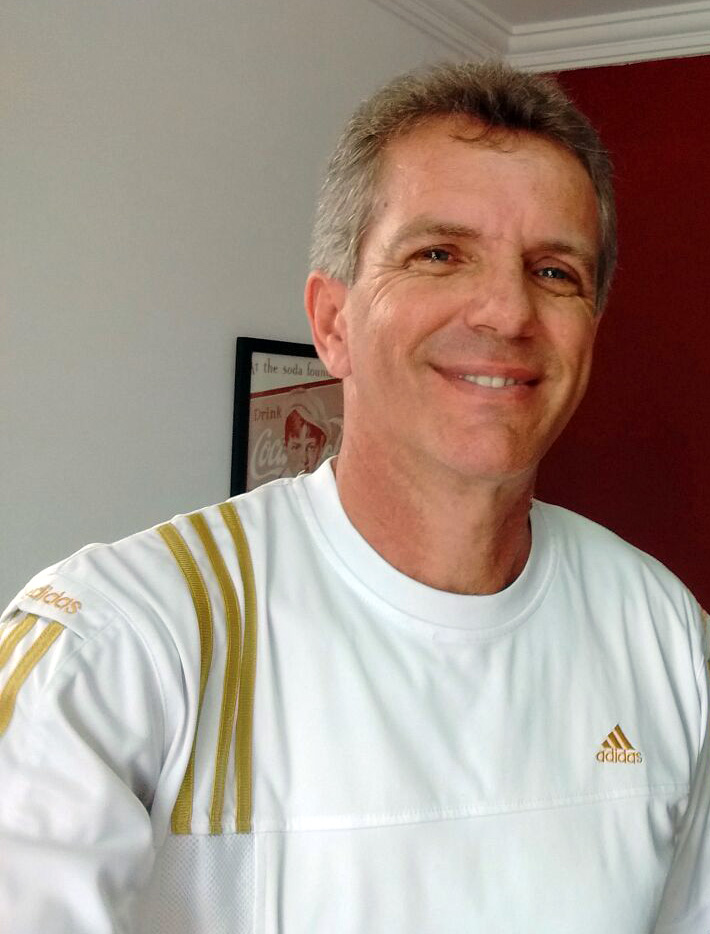
- Ronaldo Moraes in 2016

Personal information
- Full name: Ronaldo Moraes da Silva
- Date of birth: 2 March 1962 (age 64)
- Place of birth: São Paulo, Brazil
- Position: Defender

Senior career*
Years	Team	Apps	(Gls)
1980–1985	Corinthians	62	(2)
1982	→ Operário-PR (loan)		
1985–1986	Grêmio		
1986	Goiás	17	(0)
1986–1989	Santo André		
1990–1991	Botafogo-SP		
1992	Coquimbo Unido	4	(0)
1992–1993	Palestino	46	(0)

International career
1984	Brazil Olympic		
Medal record
Men's Football
Representing Brazil
Silver medal – second place	1984 Los Angeles	Team
- * Club domestic league appearances and goals

Ronaldo Moraes da Silva (born 2 March 1962), known as Ronaldo Moraes, is a Brazilian former footballer who played as a defender. He competed in the 1984 Summer Olympics with the Brazil national football team.

== Career ==
Abroad, Ronaldo played in Chile for Coquimbo Unido, taking part in the 1992 Copa Libertadores, and Palestino.
