= Marcus Vinícius Freire =

Brazilian volleyball player (born 1962)

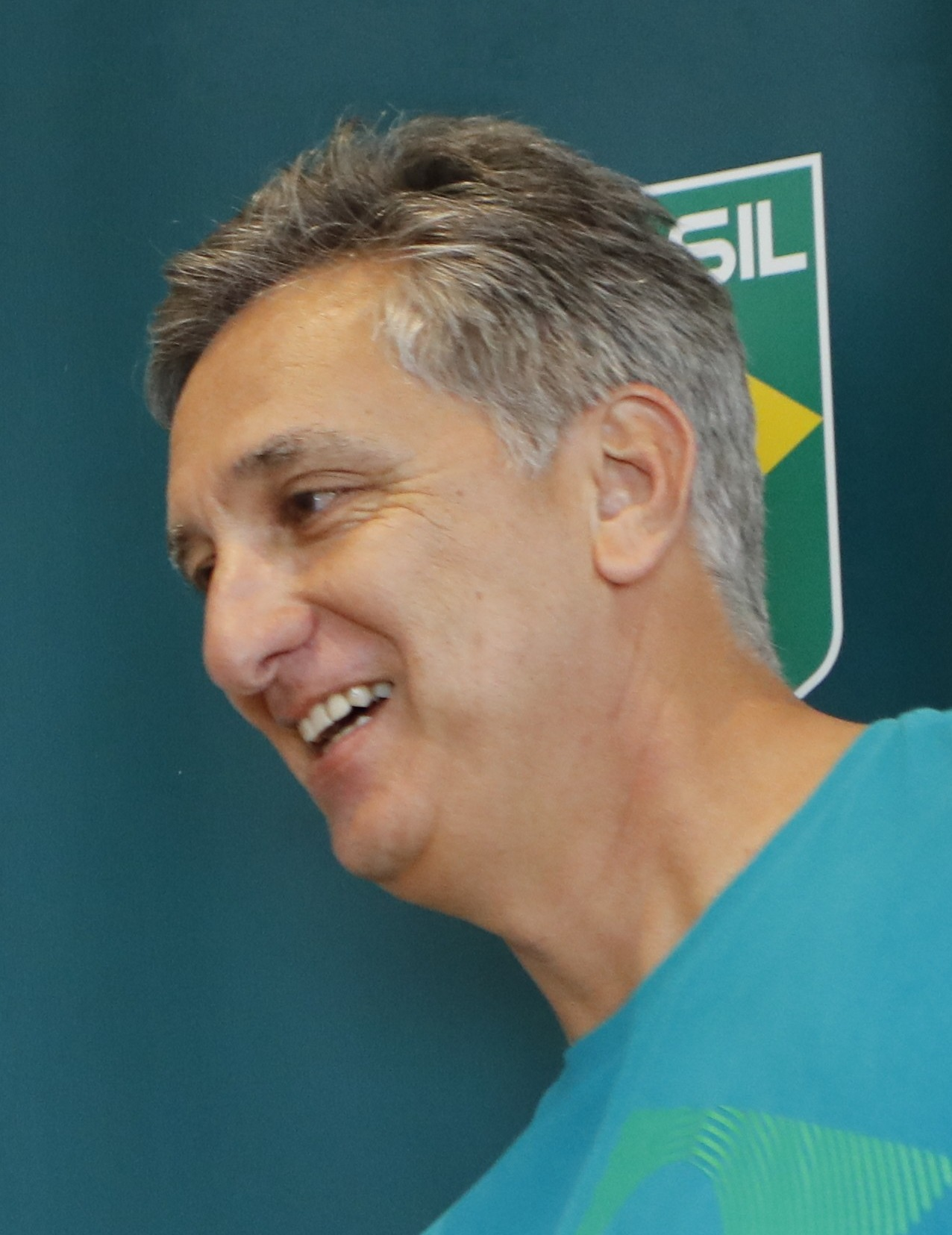
- Freire in 2016

Personal information
- Born: 6 December 1962 (age 63); Bento Gonçalves, Brazil
- Height: 1.95 m (6 ft 5 in)
- Weight: 87 kg (192 lb)

Volleyball information
- Position: Outside hitter
- Number: 9

National team
1983–1984	Brazil
Honours
Men's volleyball
Representing Brazil
Olympic Games
Silver medal – second place	1984 Los Angeles	Team
Pan American Games
Gold medal – first place	1983 Caracas	Team
CSV South American Championship
Gold medal – first place	1983 São Paulo

Marcus Vinícius Simões Freire (born 6 December 1962) is a Brazilian sports official and retired volleyball player. He won a gold medal at the 1983 Pan American Games and a silver at the 1984 Olympics. After retiring from competitions he became a sports functionary. He is the current Executive Director of the Brazilian Olympic Committee and a Chef de Mission of the Brazilian team at the 2016 Summer Olympics.
