= André Luís (footballer, born 1959) =

Brazilian footballer

Personal information
- Full name: André Luís dos Santos Ferreira
- Date of birth: 21 October 1959 (age 67)
- Place of birth: Porto Alegre, Brazil
- Height: 1.78 m (5 ft 10 in)
- Position: Defender

Youth career
- 1973–1977: Internacional

Senior career*
Years	Team	Apps	(Gls)
1978–1985	Internacional		
1986	Bahia		
1986	Coritiba		
1987–1989	São José-SP		
1988	→ Bangu (loan)	16	(0)
1990	Sport Recife		
1990	Blumenau		
1991	Sãocarlense		
1991	Taubaté		
1992	Ypiranga-RS		
1992	Bandeirante		
1993	São José de Cachoeira		
1993	Pousada das Missões		
1994–1996	Catanduvense		

International career
1984	Brazil Olympic	4	(0)

Managerial career
- 1996–1997: Internacional (youth)
- 1997–2003: Internacional (assistant)
- 2003–2005: Al-Ahli Jeddah (assistant)
- 2005–2006: Guarani-VA
- Sapiranga
- Pelotas
- São Gabriel
- Rio Grande
- 2008: São José-RS
- 2008: São José-SP
- 2009: São José-RS
- 2009: Guarany de Bagé
- 2009: São José-RS
- 2010: Brasil de Pelotas
- 2010: Veranópolis
- 2011: São Paulo-RS
- 2011: Glória
- 2011: Criciúma (assistant)
- 2011: ABC (assistant)
- 2012: Mogi Mirim (assistant)
- 2012–2013: Ponte Preta (assistant)
- 2013–2014: Portuguesa (assistant)
- 2014–2015: Ponte Preta (assistant)
- 2015–2016: Chapecoense (assistant)
- 2016–2017: Bahia (assistant)
- 2017: Internacional (assistant)
- 2018: Bahia (assistant)
- 2018: Chapecoense (assistant)
- 2019–2020: Sport Recife (assistant)
- 2020–2021: Ceará (assistant)
- 2021–2022: Bahia (assistant)
- 2022: Coritiba (assistant)
- 2023: Goiás (assistant)
- 2023: Ceará (assistant)
Medal record
Men's Football
Representing Brazil
Silver medal – second place	1984 Los Angeles	Team
- * Club domestic league appearances and goals

André Luís dos Santos Ferreira (born 21 October 1959), known as André Luís, is a Brazilian retired footballer who played as a defender, and is an assistant manager. He competed in the 1984 Summer Olympics with the Brazil national football team.
