= Gilmar Popoca =

Brazilian footballer (born 1964)

Personal information
- Full name: Augilmar Silva de Oliveira
- Date of birth: 18 February 1964 (age 62)
- Place of birth: Manaus, Brazil
- Position: Attacking midfielder

Youth career
- 1980–1983: Flamengo

Senior career*
Years	Team	Apps	(Gls)
1983–1988	Flamengo	35	(9)
1987	→ Ponte Preta (loan)	7	(7)
1988	Botafogo	10	(1)
1990	Vitória	3	
1990	Santos	20	(4)
1990	São Paulo	6	(1)
1993	Coritiba	4	
1993–1994	Marítimo		
1995	Moto Clube		
1995	León		
1996	Veracruz		
1997–1998	Louletano		
1998	Bolívar		
1998	Sampaio Corrêa	2	

International career
1983	Brazil U20		
1984–1986	Brazil U23	10	(4)

Managerial career
- 2015–2016: Flamengo (U-17)
- 2016–: Flamengo (U-20)
Medal record
Men's Football
Representing Brazil
Olympics
Silver medal – second place	1984 Los Angeles	Team
South American Games
Bronze medal – third place	1986 Santiago
- * Club domestic league appearances and goals

Augilmar Silva de Oliveira (born 18 February 1964), known as just Gilmar Popoca, is a Brazilian former footballer who played as an attacking midfielder. He competed in the 1984 Summer Olympics with the Brazil national under-23 football team.

== Honours ==
=== Club ===
Flamengo

- Campeonato Brasileiro Série A: 1983, 1987
- Campeonato Carioca: 1986

Vitória

- Campeonato Baiano: 1989

Sampaio Corrêa

- Campeonato Maranhense: 1998
- Copa Norte: 1998

=== International ===
Brazil

- South American U-20 Championship: 1983
- FIFA U-20 World Cup: 1983
