= Domingos Maracanã =

Brazilian volleyball player (born 1961)

Domingos Lampariello Neto

Personal information
- Full name: Domingos Lampariello Neto
- Nickname: Domingos Maracanã
- Born: 7 March 1961 (age 65); São Paulo, São Paulo, Brazil
- Height: 1.98 m (6 ft 6 in)

Volleyball information
- Position: Middle blocker
- Number: 10

National team
1981–1989	Brazil
Honours
Men's volleyball
Representing Brazil
Olympic Games
Silver medal – second place	1984 Los Angeles	Team
World Championship
Silver medal – second place	1982 Argentina
FIVB World Cup
Bronze medal – third place	1981 Japan
Pan American Games
Gold medal – first place	1983 Caracas	Team
Bronze medal – third place	1987 Indianapolis	Team
CSV South American Championship
Gold medal – first place	1989 Curitiba

Domingos Lampariello Neto (born 7 March 1961), known as Domingos Maracanã, is a Brazilian former volleyball player who competed in the 1984 Summer Olympics and in the 1988 Summer Olympics.

In 1984, Maracanã was part of the Brazilian team that won the silver medal in the Olympic tournament. He played five matches.

Four years later, Maracanã finished fourth with the Brazilian team in the 1988 Olympic tournament. He played all seven matches.
