= 1983 Men's South American Volleyball Championship =

The 1983 Men's South American Volleyball Championship, the 15th tournament, took place in 1983 in São Paulo (Brazil).

== Final positions ==
| Place | Team |
|---|---|
| | Brazil |
| | Argentina |
| | Chile |
| 4 | Venezuela |
| 5 | Colombia |
| 6 | Ecuador |
| 7 | Uruguay |

Source: Todor66.com
