= List of flag bearers for Brazil at the Olympics =

Brazil at the Olympics
- IOC code: BRA
- NOC: Brazilian Olympic Committee
- Website: www.cob.org.br (in Portuguese)
- Medals: Gold 41 Silver 49 Bronze 81 Total 171

Summer appearances
- 1920; 1924; 1928; 1932; 1936; 1948; 1952; 1956; 1960; 1964; 1968; 1972; 1976; 1980; 1984; 1988; 1992; 1996; 2000; 2004; 2008; 2012; 2016; 2020; 2024

Winter appearances
- 1992; 1994; 1998; 2002; 2006; 2010; 2014; 2018; 2022; 2026

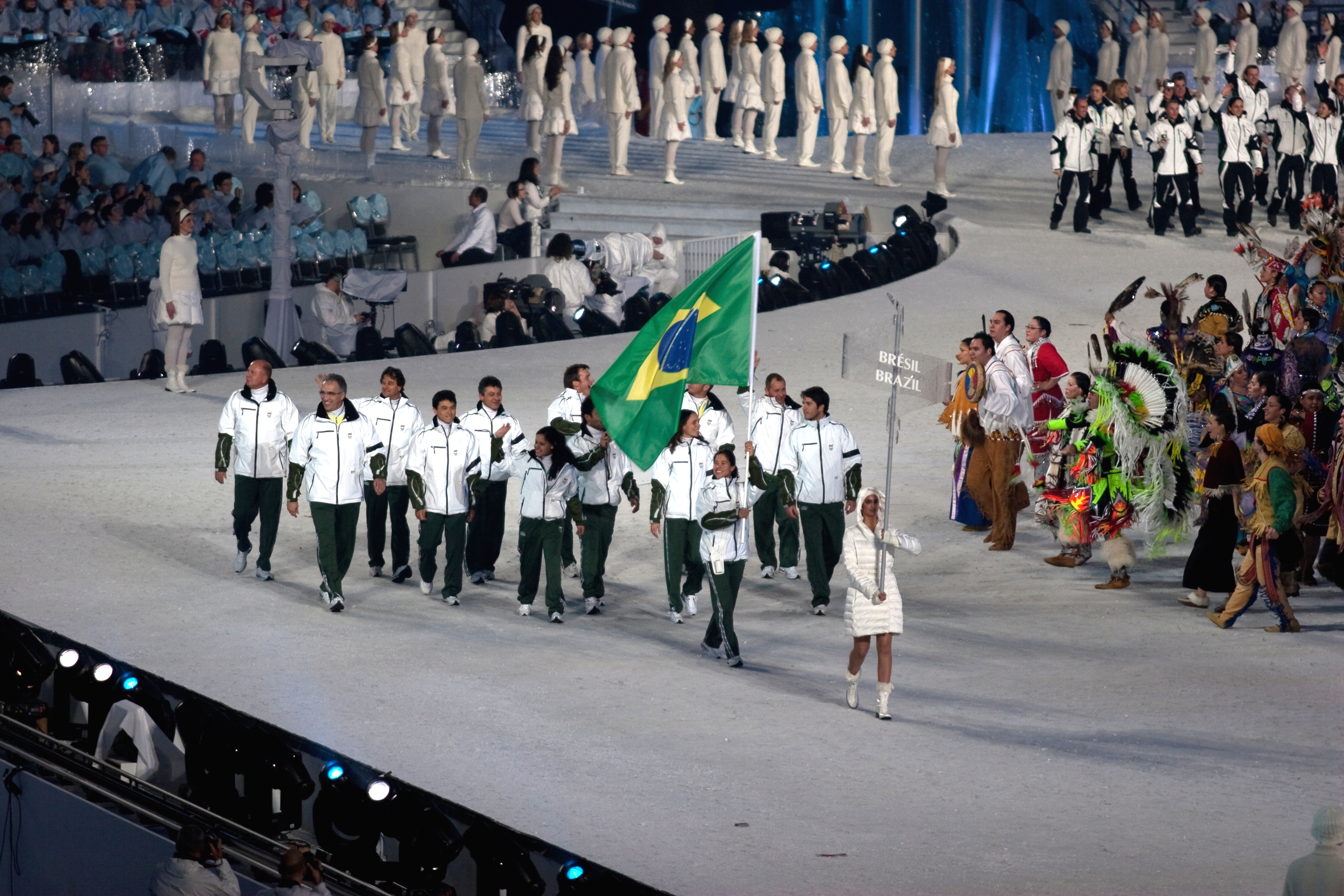
Isabel Clark Ribeiro carrying the Brazilian flag during the 2010 Winter Olympics opening ceremony

This is a list of flag bearers who have represented Brazil at the Olympics.

Flag bearers carry the national flag of their country at the opening ceremony of the Olympic Games.

#	Event year	Season	Flag bearer	Sport
1	1920	Summer	Guilherme Paraense	Shooting
2	1924	Summer	Alfredo Gomes	Athletics
3	1932	Summer	Antônio Lira	Athletics
4	1936	Summer	Sylvio de Magalhães Padilha	Athletics
5	1948	Summer	Sylvio de Magalhães Padilha	Athletics
6	1952	Summer	Mário Jorge da Fonseca Hermes	Basketball
7	1956	Summer	Adhemar Ferreira da Silva	Athletics
8	1960	Summer	Adhemar Ferreira da Silva	Athletics
9	1964	Summer	Wlamir Marques	Basketball
10	1968	Summer	João Gonçalves Filho	Water polo
11	1972	Summer	Luiz Cláudio Menon	Basketball
12	1976	Summer	João Carlos de Oliveira	Athletics
13	1980	Summer	João Carlos de Oliveira	Athletics
14	1984	Summer	Eduardo de Souza	Sailing
15	1988	Summer	Walter Carmona	Judo
16	1992	Winter	Hans Egger	Alpine skiing
17	1992	Summer	Aurélio Miguel	Judo
18	1994	Winter	Lothar Christian Munder	Alpine skiing
19	1996	Summer	Joaquim Cruz	Athletics
20	1998	Winter	Marcelo Apovian	Alpine skiing
21	2000	Summer	Sandra Pires	Volleyball
22	2002	Winter	Mirella Arnhold	Alpine skiing
23	2004	Summer	Torben Grael	Sailing
24	2006	Winter	Isabel Clark Ribeiro	Snowboarding
25	2008	Summer	Robert Scheidt	Sailing
26	2010	Winter	Isabel Clark Ribeiro	Snowboarding
27	2012	Summer	Rodrigo Pessoa	Equestrian
28	2014	Winter	Jaqueline Mourão	Biathlon / Cross-country skiing
29	2016	Summer	Yane Marques	Modern pentathlon
30	2018	Winter	Edson Bindilatti	Bobsleigh
31	2020	Summer	Ketleyn Quadros	Judo
31	2020	Summer	Bruno Rezende	Volleyball
32	2022	Winter	Jaqueline Mourão	Cross-country skiing
32	2022	Winter	Edson Bindilatti	Bobsleigh
33	2024	Summer	Raquel Kochhann	Rugby sevens
33	2024	Summer	Isaquias Queiroz	Canoeing
34	2026	Winter	Nicole Silveira	Skeleton
34	2026	Winter	Lucas Pinheiro Braathen	Alpine skiing

== See also ==
- Brazil at the Olympics
