= Brazil at the 2006 Winter Olympics =

- IOC code: BRA
- NOC: Brazilian Olympic Committee
- Website: www.cob.org.br (in Portuguese)

in Turin
- Competitors: 10 in 4 sports
- Flag bearers: Isabel Clark (opening); Nikolai Hentsch (closing)
- Medals: Gold 0 Silver 0 Bronze 0 Total 0

Winter Olympics appearances (overview)
- 1992; 1994; 1998; 2002; 2006; 2010; 2014; 2018; 2022; 2026

Isabel Clark Ribeiro, a snowboarder, carried the flag at the opening ceremonies. Clark is also the Brazilian athlete who achieved the best result in the Brazilian delegation, making it to the quarterfinals in women's snowboard cross, finishing ninth overall.

The substitute on the Bobsleigh team, Claudinei Quirino, was a silver medalist in the Summer Olympic Games, where he finished second in Sydney with the Brazilian 4 × 100 m relay team. By participating in the Winter Games, Quirino became the second Brazilian man to have participated in both the Summer and Winter Games (the first was Matheus Inocêncio, who participated in Salt Lake 2002 and Athens 2004). On the women's side, Jaqueline Mourão became the first woman to have achieved this feat: she had participated in the mountain bike competition of Athens 2004 and in Turin 2006, she took part in the 10 km classical.

On 22 February, the Brazilian Olympic Committee announced, in Rio de Janeiro, that alpine skier Nikolai Hentsch was to be the flag bearer for Brazil at the closing ceremonies of the Winter Games. For the closing ceremony, all the nine athletes participating in the Games remained in Turin. The Brazilians were seated by the organization in a privileged spot: in the first row immediately behind the podium where IOC president Jacques Rogge and the president of the Turin 2006 Organizing Committee, Valentino Castellani, delivered their speeches.

== Alpine skiing ==
Nikolai Hentsch competed in four of the five alpine skiing events, and had the Brazilian alpine team's best finish, placing 30th in the giant slalom.

Athlete	Event	Final				
Athlete	Event	Run 1	Run 2	Run 3	Total	Rank
Mirella Arnhold	Women's giant slalom	1:20.17	1:29.00	n/a	2:49.17	43
Nikolai Hentsch	Men's downhill	n/a			1:56.58	43
Nikolai Hentsch	Men's super-G	did not finish				
Nikolai Hentsch	Men's giant slalom	1:27.78	1:27.78	n/a	2:55.56	30
Nikolai Hentsch	Men's combined	1:45.42	disqualified			

Note: In the men's combined, run 1 is the downhill, and runs 2 and 3 are the slalom. In the women's combined, run 1 and 2 are the slalom, and run 3 the downhill.

== Bobsleigh ==
On 13 February, the Brazilian Olympic Committee announced that Armando dos Santos' preventive antidoping test, which had been done in Brazil on 4 January, was positive for the forbidden substance nandrolone. Santos was ejected from the team, being replaced by former sprinter Claudinei Quirino, the team's substitute athlete.

On 18 February, the Australian Olympic Committee filed a request with the International Olympic Committee, claiming that the qualification of the Brazilian team to the Olympics was invalid, and thus the Brazilian team should not be allowed to compete. The claim of the Australian Committee revolved around the circumstances of the qualification: the Brazilians earned their spot in the Games by winning the 2006 Challenge Cup, in late January, which awarded two spots in the Olympics.

That event took place two weeks after Armando dos Santos' anti-doping test, which turned out to be positive, had been performed, although the result was only divulged on 13 February. In that event, New Zealand came in second, which earned them a spot in the Olympics as well, and the Australian team was third. Thus, the Australians claimed that the Brazilian result should have been canceled, given the previous – although then unknown — positive doping result of an athlete of the Brazilian team. This would have removed the Brazilian team from the Olympics and awarded Australia the spot, as the second valid result from the qualification event (New Zealand would have moved to first place). On 19 February, the IOC ruled in favor of the Brazilians, rejecting the motion from the Australian Olympic Committee.

Run 1 – In their first run, the Brazilians' sleigh turned over coming out of Curve 14, after an error by pilot Ricardo Raschini, causing the team to finish with an exceedingly slow time. After an initial scare, the Brazilians got out of the sleigh and decided to continue in the competition. No one was hurt and their sleigh was not damaged, but they had to borrow a helmet from the German team since one of the Brazilians' was badly damaged during the accident.

Run 3 – In what looked like a replay of Heat 1, the Brazilians once again turned over in Curve 14. Once again, pilot Ricardo Raschini miscalculated his exit of this curve, causing the sleigh to turn over. This time, the accident was slightly more violent than the original one: the sleigh was completely upside down for a few seconds, and pusher Claudinei Quirino got out of the sleigh complaining of pain in one of his arms, being taken by ambulance to a nearby hospital for detailed exams. He was released soon after, having been only medicated for the pain.

The event finished any faint possibility that the Brazilians could qualify for Heat 4, of which only the top 20 sleighs would participate. In an interview soon afterwards, Raschini took full responsibility for both the accidents, asking for "the forgiveness of his team and the Brazilian people", although reporting that insufficient training at the Olympic track was the main cause of his inability to master Curve 14. His teammates and Brazilian officials, however, were quick to show Raschini their full support, saying that no one is to blame for a competition mishappening and that they are already looking forward to Vancouver 2010. Edson Bindilatti, the brakeman, closed his statement vowing that "the Frozen Bananas" shall return "in style".

On another aspect of the last participation of the Brazilian team, they were able to secure a replacement helmet for second man Márcio Silva (he had had to borrow a German helmet the day before, for lack of a spare unit), having had it flown in from the United States, where the manufacturer is located.

Athlete	Event	Final					
Athlete	Event	Run 1	Run 2	Run 3	Run 4	Total	Rank
Ricardo Raschini; Márcio Silva; Claudinei Quirino; Edson Bindilatti	Four-man	1:00.31	58.51	1:00.12	did not advance		25

== Cross-country skiing ==
Distance

Athlete	Event	Final	
Athlete	Event	Total	Rank
Hélio Freitas	Men's 15 km classical	54:06.8	93
Jaqueline Mourão	Women's 10 km classical	35:59.7	67

== Snowboarding ==
Isabel Clark Ribeiro qualified for the knockout rounds in the women's snowboard cross with the 5th fastest time, but a third-place finish in her quarterfinal left her battling for 9th place. In that classification race, she was forced to race from behind after a poor start, but benefited from an accident involving all the other three participants in her race, to end up in 9th overall.

Snowboard Cross

Athlete	Event	Qualifying		1/8 finals	Quarterfinals	Semifinals	Finals	
Athlete	Event	Time	Rank	Position	Position	Position	Position	Rank
Isabel Clark Ribeiro	Women's snowboard cross	1:30.12	6 Q	n/a	3	did not advance	Classification 9–12; 1	9

== See also ==
- Brazilian Olympic Committee
