= Brazil at the 2018 Winter Olympics =

- Flag of Brazil
- IOC code: BRA
- NOC: Brazilian Olympic Committee
- Website: www.cob.org.br (in Portuguese)

in Pyeongchang, South Korea 9–25 February 2018
- Competitors: 9 in 5 sports
- Flag bearer: Edson Bindilatti (opening)
- Medals: Gold 0 Silver 0 Bronze 0 Total 0

Winter Olympics appearances (overview)
- 1992; 1994; 1998; 2002; 2006; 2010; 2014; 2018; 2022; 2026

Brazil competed at the 2018 Winter Olympics in Pyeongchang, South Korea, from 9 to 25 February 2018, with 9 competitors in 5 sports.

== Competitors ==
The following is the list of number of competitors participating in the Brazilian delegation per sport.

Sport	Men	Women	Total
Alpine skiing	1	0	1
Bobsleigh	4	0	4
Cross-country skiing	1	1	2
Figure skating	0	1	1
Snowboarding	0	1	1
Total	6	3	9

== Alpine skiing ==
Brazil qualified one male athlete. Michel Macedo competed in both slalom and giant slalom competitions. He failed to complete the course in men's slalom and giant slalom and subsequent chose not to start in super-G competition.

Athlete	Event	Run 1		Run 2		Total	
Athlete	Event	Time	Rank	Time	Rank	Time	Rank
Michel Macedo	Men's giant slalom	DNF					
Michel Macedo	Men's slalom	DNF					
Michel Macedo	Men's super-G	—N/a				DNS	

== Bobsleigh ==
Based on their rankings in the 2017–18 Bobsleigh World Cup, Brazil qualified two sleds. Due to Brazil's tropical climate, the bobsleigh team partnered with Team USA and trained at Lake Placid. All of the Brazilian team members have part-time jobs as personal trainers or coaches.

Athlete	Event	Run 1		Run 2		Run 3		Run 4		Total	
Athlete	Event	Time	Rank	Time	Rank	Time	Rank	Time	Rank	Time	Rank
Edson Bindilatti*; Edson Ricardo Martins	Two-man	50.14	27	50.22	28	50.35	29	Eliminated		2:30.71	27
Edson Bindilatti*; Edson Ricardo Martins; Odirlei Pessoni; Rafael Souza da Silva	Four-man	49.75	25	49.94	23	49.80	23	Eliminated		2:29.49	23

* – Denotes the driver of each sled

== Cross-country skiing ==
Brazil qualified 1 male and 1 female skier.

Distance

Athlete	Event	Final		
Athlete	Event	Time	Deficit	Rank
Victor Santos	Men's 15 km freestyle	47:09.9	+13:26.0	110
Jaqueline Mourão	Women's 10 km freestyle	30:50.3	+5:49.8	74

== Figure skating ==
Isadora Williams earned Brazil a berth in the Olympics with her performance in the 2017 CS Nebelhorn Trophy

Athlete	Event	SP		FS		Total	
Athlete	Event	Points	Rank	Points	Rank	Points	Rank
Isadora Williams	Ladies' singles	55.74	17 Q	88.44	24	144.18	24

== Snowboarding ==
Brazil qualified 1 female snowboarder.

Snowboard cross

Athlete	Event	Seeding						Quarterfinal	Semifinal	Final	
Athlete	Event	Run 1		Run 2		Best	Seed	Quarterfinal	Semifinal	Final	
Athlete	Event	Time	Rank	Time	Rank	Best	Seed	Position	Position	Position	Rank
Isabel Clark Ribeiro	Women's snowboard cross	DNS						Did not advance			

- She suffered an accident and was injured in a training session on February 15.

== See also ==
- Brazil at the 2018 Winter Paralympics
- Brazil at the 2018 South American Games
- Brazil at the 2018 Summer Youth Olympics
