= Brazil at the 2002 Winter Olympics =

- IOC code: BRA
- NOC: Brazilian Olympic Committee
- Website: www.cob.org.br (in Portuguese)

in Salt Lake City
- Competitors: 10 (8 men, 2 women) in 4 sports
- Flag bearers: Mirella Arnhold (opening); Renato Mizoguchi (closing)
- Medals: Gold 0 Silver 0 Bronze 0 Total 0

Winter Olympics appearances (overview)
- 1992; 1994; 1998; 2002; 2006; 2010; 2014; 2018; 2022; 2026

Brazil competed at the 2002 Winter Olympics in Salt Lake City, United States.

== Alpine skiing ==
Men

Athlete	Event	Race 1	Race 2	Total	
Athlete	Event	Time	Time	Time	Rank
Nikolai Hentsch	Giant Slalom	1:23.07	DSQ	DSQ	–

Women

Athlete	Event	Race 1	Race 2	Total	
Athlete	Event	Time	Time	Time	Rank
Mirella Arnhold	Giant Slalom	1:37.44	1:36.30	3:13.74	48

== Bobsleigh ==
Men

Sled	Athletes	Event	Run 1		Run 2		Run 3		Run 4		Total	
Sled	Athletes	Event	Time	Rank	Time	Rank	Time	Rank	Time	Rank	Time	Rank
BRA-1	Eric Maleson; Matheus Facho Inocêncio; Edson Bindilatti; Cristiano Rogério Paes	Four-man	48.91	31	48.76	29	49.44	27	49.62	27	3:16.73	27

== Cross-country skiing ==
Men

Event	Athlete	Race	
Event	Athlete	Time	Rank
50 km C	Alexander Penna	3'23:58.7	57

C = Classical style, F = Freestyle

Women

Event	Athlete	Race	
Event	Athlete	Time	Rank
10 km C	Franziska Becskehazy	46:46.0	57

C = Classical style, F = Freestyle

== Luge ==
Men

Athlete	Run 1		Run 2		Run 3		Run 4		Total	
Athlete	Time	Rank	Time	Rank	Time	Rank	Time	Rank	Time	Rank
Renato Mizoguchi	47.773	45	50.036	48	53.349	48	48.742	43	3:19.900	46
Ricardo Raschini	46.309	34	46.977	39	46.464	37	56.897	48	3:16.647	45
