= Brazil at the 2022 Winter Olympics =

- Flag of Brazil
- IOC code: BRA
- NOC: Brazilian Olympic Committee
- Website: www.cob.org.br (in Portuguese)

in Beijing, China 4–20 February 2022
- Competitors: 10 (6 men and 4 women) in 5 sports
- Flag bearers (opening): Edson Bindilatti; Jaqueline Mourão
- Flag bearer (closing): Manex Silva
- Medals: Gold 0 Silver 0 Bronze 0 Total 0

Winter Olympics appearances (overview)
- 1992; 1994; 1998; 2002; 2006; 2010; 2014; 2018; 2022; 2026

Brazil competed at the 2022 Winter Olympics in Beijing, China, from 4 to 20 February 2022.

On January 17, 2022, Brazil's team of 10 athletes (six men and four women) competing in four sports (five disciplines) was officially named.

Edson Bindilatti and Jaqueline Mourão were the flagbearers during the opening ceremony. Mourão was one of only two athletes together with Montell Douglas of Great Britain to have competed at both Beijing 2008 and 2022. Cross-country skier Manex Silva was the flagbearer during the closing ceremony.

== Competitors ==
The following is the list of number of competitors who participated at the Games per sport/discipline.

| Sport | Men | Women | Total |
|---|---|---|---|
| Alpine skiing | 1 | 0 | 1 |
| Bobsleigh | 4 | 0 | 4 |
| Cross-country skiing | 1 | 2 | 3 |
| Freestyle skiing | 0 | 1 | 1 |
| Skeleton | 0 | 1 | 1 |
| Total | 6 | 4 | 10 |

== Alpine skiing ==
By meeting the basic qualification standards, Brazil has qualified one male alpine skier.

Men

| Athlete | Event | Run 1 | | Run 2 | | Total | |
| Athlete | Event | Time | Rank | Time | Rank | Time | Rank |
|---|---|---|---|---|---|---|---|
| Michel Macedo | Men's giant slalom | DNS | | Did not advance | | | |
| Michel Macedo | Men's slalom | 59.88 | 37 | DNF | | | |

== Bobsleigh ==
Brazil qualified two sleds: one each in the two-man and four-man. This will permit Brazil to enter four athletes.

Men

| Athlete | Event | Run 1 | | Run 2 | | Run 3 | | Run 4 | | Total | |
| Athlete | Event | Time | Rank | Time | Rank | Time | Rank | Time | Rank | Time | Rank |
|---|---|---|---|---|---|---|---|---|---|---|---|
| Edson Bindilatti*; Edson Martins | Two-man | 1:01.11 | 29 | 1:01.36 | 29 | 1:01.34 | 29 | Did not advance | | 3:03.81 | 29 |
| Edson Bindilatti*; Erick Vianna; Edson Martins; Rafael Souza da Silva | Four-man | 59.49 | 20 | 59.60 | 16 | 59.78 | 23 | 59.61 | 16 | 3:58.48 | 20 |

* – Denotes the driver of each sled

== Cross-country skiing ==
By meeting the basic qualification standards, Brazil has qualified one male and one female cross-country skier. By finishing in the top-33 of the FIS Nations Ranking at the end of the 2020/2021 season, Brazil qualified another female cross-country skier. Originally, Bruna Moura was selected for one of the female quotas, but was replaced after suffering a car accident in Italy one week before the Olympics.

Distance

| Athlete | Event | Classical | | Freestyle | | Final | | |
| Athlete | Event | Time | Rank | Time | Rank | Time | Deficit | Rank |
|---|---|---|---|---|---|---|---|---|
| Manex Silva | Men's 15 km classical | —N/a | | | | 50:35.1 | +12:40.3 | 90 |
| Manex Silva | Men's 30 km skiathlon | LAP | | | | | | 67 |
| Manex Silva | Men's 50 km freestyle | —N/a | | | | 1:33:11.8 | +21:39.1 | 58 |
| Jaqueline Mourão | Women's 10 km classical | —N/a | | | | 36:14.6 | +8:08.3 | 82 |
| Eduarda Ribera | Women's 10 km classical | —N/a | | | | 38:58.7 | +10:52.4 | 90 |

Sprint

| Athlete | Event | Qualification | | Quarterfinal | | Semifinal | | Final | |
| Athlete | Event | Time | Rank | Time | Rank | Time | Rank | Time | Rank |
|---|---|---|---|---|---|---|---|---|---|
| Manex Silva | Men's | 3:08.64 | 71 | Did not advance | | | | | |
| Jaqueline Mourão | Women's | 4:05.60 | 84 | Did not advance | | | | | |
| Eduarda Ribera | Women's | 4:14.53 | 88 | Did not advance | | | | | |
| Jaqueline Mourão; Eduarda Ribera | Women's team | —N/a | | | | LAP | =12 | Did not advance | =23 |

== Freestyle skiing ==
Brazil qualified one female moguls skier, marking the country's debut in the discipline at the Winter Olympics. US born athlete, with Brazilian citizenship, Sabrina Cass will represent the country.

Moguls

| Athlete | Event | Qualification | | | | | | | | Final | | | | | | | | | | | |
| Athlete | Event | Run 1 | | | | Run 2 | | | | Run 1 | | | | Run 2 | | | | Run 3 | | | |
| Athlete | Event | Time | Points | Total | Rank | Time | Points | Total | Rank | Time | Points | Total | Rank | Time | Points | Total | Rank | Time | Points | Total | Rank |
|---|---|---|---|---|---|---|---|---|---|---|---|---|---|---|---|---|---|---|---|---|---|
| Sabrina Cass | Women's | 32.13 | 50.41 | 62.20 | 21 | 31.25 | 49.34 | 62.12 | 16 | Did not advance | | | | | | | | | | | 26 |

== Skeleton ==
Based on her placement in the IBSF ranking list Nicole Silveira qualified to compete for Brazil.

| Athlete | Event | Run 1 | | Run 2 | | Run 3 | | Run 4 | | Total | |
| Athlete | Event | Time | Rank | Time | Rank | Time | Rank | Time | Rank | Time | Rank |
|---|---|---|---|---|---|---|---|---|---|---|---|
| Nicole Silveira | Women's | 1:02.58 | 12 | 1:02.95 | 13 | 1:02.55 | 17 | 1:02.40 | 13 | 4:10.48 | 13 |

== See also ==
- Tropical nations at the Winter Olympics
- Brazil at the 2022 Winter Paralympics
