= Brazil at the 2010 Winter Olympics =

- IOC code: BRA
- NOC: Brazilian Olympic Committee
- Website: www.cob.org.br (in Portuguese)

in Vancouver
- Competitors: 5 in 3 sports
- Flag bearer (opening): Isabel Clark Ribeiro
- Flag bearer (closing): Jaqueline Mourão
- Medals: Gold 0 Silver 0 Bronze 0 Total 0

Winter Olympics appearances (overview)
- 1992; 1994; 1998; 2002; 2006; 2010; 2014; 2018; 2022; 2026

Brazil sent a delegation to compete at the 2010 Winter Olympics in Vancouver, British Columbia, Canada, held from 12–28 February 2010. The Brazilian team consisted of five athletes competing in three sports.

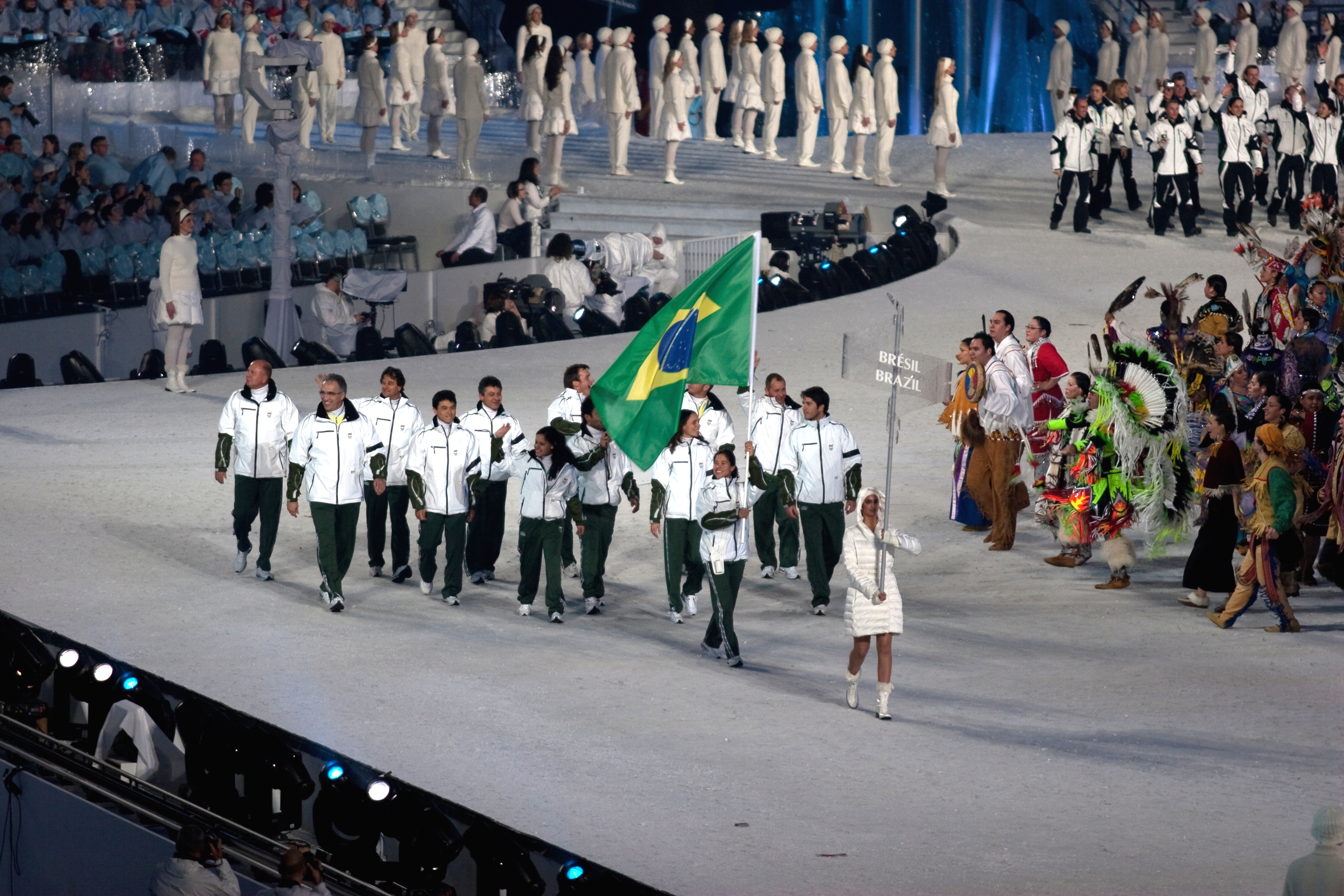
The athletes entering the stadium during the opening ceremonies.

== Background ==
Brazil's first Olympic Games were the 1900 Summer Olympics. Their first Winter Olympics came much later, in 1992, and they have competed in every Winter Games since their debut. As of these Games, they have not won a Winter Olympics medal. Snowboarder Isabel Clark Ribeiro was chosen as the flag bearer for the opening ceremony and cross-country skier Jaqueline Mourão was selected for the closing ceremony. Clark had previously been the flag bearer at the 2006 Winter Olympics opening ceremony. Mourão would go on to be the flag bearer at the 2014 Winter Olympics opening ceremony.

== Alpine skiing ==
Maya Harrisson was born in Brazil but was adopted by a Swiss family and grew up in Europe. She competed at these Olympics at the age of 17.

Men

Athlete	Event	Run 1	Run 2	Total	Rank
Johnatan Longhi	Men's giant slalom	1:24.76	1:29.27	2:54.03	56
Johnatan Longhi	Men's slalom	DNF			
Maya Harrisson	Women's giant slalom	DNF			
Maya Harrisson	Women's slalom	1:01.18	1:00.49	2:01.67	48

== Cross-country skiing ==
Leandro Ribela was 29 years old at the time of these Olympics, and he was making his Olympic debut. He had taken up skiing at the age of 12 following a trip to Argentina. In the 15 kilometre freestyle race, held on 15 February, he finished with a time of 43 minutes and 36.2 seconds. This put him in 90th place, out of 95 competitors who finished the race. He would later represent Brazil again at the 2014 Winter Olympics.

Jaqueline Mourão was 34 years old at the time of these Games, and was making her fourth Olympic appearance. She had previously participated in the 2004 and 2008 Summer Olympics in the sport of cycling, and the 2006 Winter Olympics as a cross-country skier. In Vancouver, she took part in the 10 kilometre freestyle on 15 February. She finished the race in a time of 30 minutes and 22.2 seconds. This put her in 66th place out of 77 athletes who finished the race. Like her teammate Ribela, she would also go on to represent Brazil four years later, this time expanding her efforts to both biathlon and cross-country skiing.

Athlete	Event	Final	
Athlete	Event	Total	Rank
Leandro Ribela	Men's 15 km Freestyle	43:36.2	90
Jaqueline Mourão	Women's 10 km Freestyle	30:22.2	67

== Snowboarding ==
Isabel Clark Ribeiro started snowboarding at the age of 18, after trying it out in California. She was 33 years old at the time of the Vancouver Olympics, and had previously represented Brazil at the 2006 Turin Olympics. She came in ninth place in the snowboard cross in Turin. In Vancouver, the women's snowboard cross held its qualification round on 16 February. Each competitor raced twice in the qualification round, with only the better of the times counting. The top 16 were able to progress to the next round of the competition. In her first run, she posted a time of 1 minute and 41.10 seconds, followed by a slower time of 1 minute and 51.65 seconds. Her better time still saw her in 19th place, and she was eliminated from the competition. In the run up to her participation at the 2014 Winter Olympics Ribeiro said she had landed flat after a jump and injured her knee in Vancouver.

Athlete	Event	Qualification		Round of 16	Quarterfinals	Semifinals	Finals	
Athlete	Event	Time	Rank	Opposition Time	Opposition Time	Opposition Time	Opposition Time	Rank
Isabel Clark Ribeiro	Women's snowboard cross	1:41.10	19	Did not advance				
