= Brazil at the 2014 Winter Olympics =

- IOC code: BRA
- NOC: Brazilian Olympic Committee
- Website: www.cob.org.br (in Portuguese)

in Sochi
- Competitors: 13 in 7 sports
- Flag bearer: Jaqueline Mourão (opening) Isadora Williams (closing)
- Medals: Gold 0 Silver 0 Bronze 0 Total 0

Winter Olympics appearances (overview)
- 1992; 1994; 1998; 2002; 2006; 2010; 2014; 2018; 2022; 2026

Brazil competed at the 2014 Winter Olympics in Sochi, Russia from 7 to 23 February 2014. With 13 athletes qualified, Brazil sent its largest ever team to the Winter Olympics, surpassing the ten it qualified for the 2002 Winter Olympics in Salt Lake City, United States. The 13 athletes also represent the third largest team from the Americas and the biggest of non-snowing countries.

== Competitors ==
Sport	Men	Women	Total
Alpine skiing	1	1	2
Biathlon	0	1*	1
Bobsleigh	4	2	6
Cross-country skiing	1	1	2
Figure skating	0	1	1
Freestyle skiing	0	1	1
Snowboarding	0	1	1
Total	6	7	13

- Jaqueline Mourão also competed in cross-country skiing.

== Alpine skiing ==
According to the quota allocation released on December 30, 2013, Brazil has qualified two athletes. Brazil's two athletes are the same ones who represented the country in Vancouver four years earlier.

Athlete	Event	Run 1		Run 2		Total	
Athlete	Event	Time	Rank	Time	Rank	Time	Rank
Jhonatan Longhi	Men's giant slalom	1:33.03	64	1:33.69	57	3:06.72	58
Jhonatan Longhi	Men's slalom	59.24	69	DSQ			
Maya Harrisson	Women's giant slalom	1:30.31	58	1:31.55	55	3:01.86	54
Maya Harrisson	Women's slalom	1:04.88	46	1:03.45	42	2:08.33	39

== Biathlon ==
Pending reallocation of quotas, will allow Brazil to enter one female athlete. Jaqueline Mourão also competed in cross-country skiing.

Athlete	Event	Time	Misses	Rank
Jaqueline Mourão	Women's sprint	25:06.4	1 (0+1)	77
Jaqueline Mourão	Women's individual	57:22.6	7 (1+2+3+1)	76

== Bobsleigh ==
Brazil's four man and two women bobsled teams have qualified.

Athlete	Event	Run 1		Run 2		Run 3		Run 4		Total	
Athlete	Event	Time	Rank	Time	Rank	Time	Rank	Time	Rank	Time	Rank
Edson Bindilatti*; Fábio Gonçalves Silva; Edson Martins; Odirlei Pessoni	Four-man	56.86	26	56.74	25	57.11	27	did not advance		2:50.71	26
Fabiana Santos*; Sally da Silva	Two-woman	59.57	18	1:00.45	19	1:00.73	19	1:01.20	19	4:01.95	19

* – Denotes the driver of each sled

== Cross-country skiing ==
According to the quota allocation released on January 20, 2014, Brazil has qualified two athletes. Brazil's two athletes are the same ones who represented the country in Vancouver four years earlier.

Sprint

Athlete	Event	Qualification		Quarterfinal		Semifinal		Final	
Athlete	Event	Time	Rank	Time	Rank	Time	Rank	Time	Rank
Leandro Ribela	Men's sprint	4:21.12	80	did not advance					
Jaqueline Mourão	Women's sprint	3:02.83	65	did not advance					

== Figure skating ==
Isadora Williams qualified a quota spot by finishing in the top six countries qualified at the 2013 Nebelhorn Trophy. By doing so, she became the first figure skater to ever qualify from Brazil.

Athlete	Event	SP		FS		Total	
Athlete	Event	Points	Rank	Points	Rank	Points	Rank
Isadora Williams	Ladies' singles	40.37	30	did not advance			

== Freestyle skiing ==
Brazil has received one quota for women's aerials via reallocation. Originally Olympic gymnast Laís Souza was supposed to compete but a serious accident during training forced her to withdraw from the competition.

Aerials

Athlete	Event	Qualification				Final					
Athlete	Event	Jump 1		Jump 2		Jump 1		Jump 2		Jump 3	
Athlete	Event	Points	Rank	Points	Rank	Points	Rank	Points	Rank	Points	Rank
Joselane Santos	Women's aerials	49.60	20	48.17	16	did not advance					

== Snowboarding ==
According to the quota allocation released on December 30, 2013, Brazil has qualified one athlete.

Athlete	Event	Seeding		Quarterfinal	Semifinal	Final	
Athlete	Event	Time	Rank	Position	Position	Position	Rank
Isabel Clark Ribeiro	Women's snowboard cross	1:24.31	12	4	did not advance		14

== See also ==
- Brazil at the 2014 Summer Youth Olympics
- Brazil at the 2014 Winter Paralympics
