= Brazil at the 1992 Winter Olympics =

- IOC code: BRA
- NOC: Brazilian Olympic Committee
- Website: www.cob.org.br (in Portuguese)

in Albertville
- Competitors: 7 (6 men, 1 woman) in 1 sport
- Flag bearer: Hans Egger (alpine skiing)
- Medals: Gold 0 Silver 0 Bronze 0 Total 0

Winter Olympics appearances (overview)
- 1992; 1994; 1998; 2002; 2006; 2010; 2014; 2018; 2022; 2026

Brazil competed at the Winter Olympic Games for the first time at the 1992 Winter Olympics in Albertville, France.

== Competitors ==
The following is the list of number of competitors in the Games.

Sport	Men	Women	Total
Alpine skiing	6	1	7
Total	6	1	7

== Alpine skiing ==
Men

Athlete	Event	Race 1	Race 2	Total	
Athlete	Event	Time	Time	Time	Rank
Marcelo Apovian	Super-G			1:27.87	76
Marcelo Apovian	Giant slalom	1:23.07	1:24.97	2:48.04	73
Marcelo Apovian	Slalom	DNF	–	DNF	–
Robert Scott Detlof	Slalom	2:06.00	1:12.58	3:18.58	63
Hans Egger	Super-G			1:35.88	86
Hans Egger	Giant slalom	1:27.47	DNF	DNF	–
Hans Egger	Slalom	1:11.95	1:12.56	2:24.51	48
Fábio Igel	Giant slalom	1:28.83	DNF	DNF	–
Lothar Christian Munder	Downhill			2:07.34	41
Lothar Christian Munder	Super-G			1:21.07	55
Sérgio Schuler	Super-G			1:27.41	74
Sérgio Schuler	Giant slalom	1:22.31	1:20.30	2:42.61	64
Sérgio Schuler	Slalom	DNF	–	DNF	–

Men's combined

Athlete	Downhill	Slalom		Total	
Athlete	Time	Time 1	Time 2	Points	Rank
Lothar Christian Munder	1:57.01	1:07.26	DNF	DNF	–

Women

Athlete	Event	Race 1	Race 2	Total	
Athlete	Event	Time	Time	Time	Rank
Evelyn Schuler	Super-G			1:48.74	46
Evelyn Schuler	Giant slalom	1:26.62	1:31.70	2:58.32	40
