= Bobsleigh at the 2014 Winter Olympics – Qualification =

The qualification system for bobsleigh at the 2014 Winter Olympics determined the number of athletes and sleds each nation could enter in the men's and women's events. Qualification was based primarily on International Bobsleigh and Skeleton Federation (FIBT) world rankings and results from the 2012–13 and 2013–14 seasons, with additional quota places reserved to ensure host nation and continental representation.

== Qualification Rules ==
A maximum of 170 quota spots are available to athletes to compete at the games. A maximum 130 men and 40 women may qualify. The qualification is based on the world rankings of January 20, 2014. Pilots must compete in five different races on three different tracks during the 2012/13 season or 2013/14 season. Men pilots must be in the top 50 of the world rankings, while women need to be in the top 40. Each continent (Africa, Americas, Asia, Europe and Oceania) and the hosts are allowed to enter a sled provided they meet the above standard. For each men's event 30 sleds will be allowed to compete (maximum of three NOCs with three sleds and six NOCs with two sleds). For the women's event there will be a total of 20 sleds allowed to compete (maximum of two NOCs with three sleds, four NOCs with two sleds).

== Qualification timeline ==
Races from October 1, 2013, until January 19 will apply to qualification for the Olympics. In general this means that the Olympic field is established by using the first seven world cup races of the 2013-14 season, but also includes results from intercontinental, Europe, and America cup races. Four sleds will then be allocated in both men's categories, and three in the women's, to either host or continental representation. Unused or reallocated spots will be filled by January 27, 2014.

== Quota allocation ==
The following summary is not indicative of assurance of Olympic qualification, but of how the allocations would be represented based on the current FIBT rankings.

=== Current summary ===
Nations	Two-man	Four-man	Two-woman	Athletes
Australia	1	1	1	6
Austria	1	1	1	6
Belgium			1	2
Brazil		1	1	6
Canada	3	3	2	16
Czech Republic	1	1		4
France	1	2		8
Germany	3	3	3	18
Great Britain	1	2	1	8
Italy	1	1	~~1~~	4
Jamaica	1			2
Japan	1	1		4
Latvia	2	2		8
Monaco	1			2
Netherlands	~~2~~ 1	1	1	6
Poland	1	1		4
Romania	1	1	1	8
Russia	2	3	2	16
Serbia	1			2
Slovakia	~~1~~	1		4
South Korea	2	2	1	10
Switzerland	2	~~2~~ 1	2	9
United States	3	2	3	16
Total: 23 NOCs	30	30	20	169

- Most countries have athletes that crossover between the two-men and four-men events. Romania and the United States are the only two countries which have some turnover between the two-men and four-man teams.

=== Two man ===
Final ranking by nation (as of January 18, 2013).

Sleds qualified	Athletes total	Rank of applicable sled
3	18	United States 6 Canada 11; Germany 12
2	18	Russia 13; Latvia 14; Switzerland 15; South Korea 22; ~~Netherlands~~ 29^{1}
1	24	Italy 19; France 20; Netherlands 21; Monaco 23; Austria 24; Romania 26; Japan 27; Great Britain 28; Australia 32^{2} Poland 35; Jamaica 39; Serbia 41; ~~Slovakia 48~~; Czech Republic 52^{3}
30	60	19

1. Netherlands qualified two sleds, but elected to send only one.
2. The final four sleds are given to fulfill continental representation (Australia), and then to the top nations not previously qualified (Poland, Jamaica, Serbia).
3. Czech Republic received the unused quota spot from the Netherlands. Slovakia was ranked higher, but also declined the spot.

=== Four man ===
Final ranking by nation (as of January 19, 2014).

Sleds qualified	Athletes total	Rank of applicable sled
3	36	Germany 8 Canada 10; Russia 13
2	40	United States 14; Latvia 15; Great Britain 20; ~~Switzerland 27~~^{1} South Korea 44; France 46
1	44	Switzerland 11; Netherlands 16; Italy 17; Japan 23; Czech Republic 24; Australia 30; Romania 32; Austria 35; Brazil 36^{2} Poland 37; Slovakia 38^{3}
30	120	

1. Switzerland rejected one of its two qualified sleds.
2. The final four sleds (Brazil, Poland, Slovakia, Serbia) are allocated at the end to the top nations not previously qualified.
3. Slovakia received the unused quota spot from Switzerland.

=== Two women ===
Final ranking by nation (as of January 19, 2014).

Sleds qualified	Athletes total	Rank of applicable sled
3	12	Germany 6 United States 7
2	12	Switzerland 12; Canada 14; Russia 18
1	16	Belgium 9 Netherlands 11; Great Britain 13; Australia 19; Austria 20; Brazil 23; ~~Italy 27~~^{1} South Korea 29^{2} Romania 28^{3}
20	40	12

1. Italy rejected using its quota it qualified.
2. The final three sleds are given to fulfill continental representation (South Korea), and then to the top nations not previously qualified (Brazil and Italy).
3. Romania received the unused quota spot from Italy.
