= Erick Vianna =

Brazilian bobsledder (born 1993)

Personal information
- Full name: Erick Gilson Vianna Jerônimo
- Born: 19 February 1993 (age 33) Araraquara, Brazil

Achievements and titles
- Olympic finals: 2022
Medal record
Bobsleigh
Representing Brazil
Pan American Championships
Bronze medal – third place	2025 Whistler	Four-man bob

Erick Vianna, born on 19 February 1993 in Araraquara is a Brazilian bobsledder. He competed at the 2022 Winter Olympics in Beijing in the four-man bobsleigh, together with Edson Bindilatti, Rafael Souza da Silva and Edson Martins, finishing in 20th place. He almost could not compete in the event in China after a positive result of COVID-19, but was allowed after two negative tests.

In 2025 he won a bronze medal at the IBSF Pan American Championships in Whistler,Canada in the four-man event, together with Edson Bindilatti, Rafael Souza da Silva and Edson Martins. Canada won the gold and silver medal at the event.
