= Brazil at the 1994 Winter Olympics =

- IOC code: BRA
- NOC: Brazilian Olympic Committee
- Website: www.cob.org.br (in Portuguese)

in Lillehammer
- Competitors: 1 in 1 sport
- Flag bearer: Lothar Christian Munder
- Medals: Gold 0 Silver 0 Bronze 0 Total 0

Winter Olympics appearances (overview)
- 1992; 1994; 1998; 2002; 2006; 2010; 2014; 2018; 2022; 2026

Brazil sent a delegation to compete at the 1994 Winter Olympics in Lillehammer, Norway from 12–27 February 1994. This was Brazil's second time competing at a Winter Olympic Games, following their debut two years prior. Lothar Christian Munder, who had been part of the delegation to those Olympics was the only athlete sent by Brazil to Lillehammer. In his only event, the downhill, he came in 50th place.

== Background ==
The Brazilian Olympic Committee was recognized by the International Olympic Committee (IOC) on 1 January 1935, 21 years after its creation. Brazil first joined Olympic Competition at the 1900 Summer Olympics, and made their first Winter Olympics appearance in 1992. Therefore the 1994 Winter Olympics were their second appearance at a Winter Olympic Games. The 1994 Winter Olympics were held from 12–27 February 1994; a total of 1,737 athletes representing 67 National Olympic Committees took part. These 1994 Games were the only Winter Olympics to be held two years after the prior Olympics, as the IOC desired a schedule where Summer and Winter Olympics would no longer be held in the same year. Lothar Christian Munder was the only athlete sent by Brazil to Lillehammer. He was also selected as the flag bearer for the opening ceremony.

== Competitors ==
The following is the list of number of competitors in the Games.

Sport	Men	Women	Total
Alpine skiing	1	0	1
Total	1	0	1

== Alpine skiing ==
Lothar Christian Munder was 31 years old at the time of the Lillehammer Olympics, and was making his second Olympic appearance, after the 1992 Winter Olympics. On 13 February, he took part in the men's downhill. He finished the race in a time of 1 minute and 56.48 seconds, which put him in 50th and last place among classified finishers. The gold medal was won by Tommy Moe of the United States in a time of 1 minute and 45.75 seconds, the silver was won by Norwegian Kjetil André Aamodt a mere four one-hundredths of a second behind Moe, and the bronze was taken by Canadian Ed Podivinsky.

Athlete	Event	Final	
Athlete	Event	Time	Rank
Lothar Christian Munder	Men's downhill	1:56.48	50
