= Brazil at the 1998 Winter Olympics =

- IOC code: BRA
- NOC: Brazilian Olympic Committee
- Website: www.cob.org.br (in Portuguese)

in Nagano
- Competitors: 1 (man) in 1 sport
- Flag bearer: Marcelo Apovian
- Medals: Gold 0 Silver 0 Bronze 0 Total 0

Winter Olympics appearances (overview)
- 1992; 1994; 1998; 2002; 2006; 2010; 2014; 2018; 2022; 2026

Brazil sent a delegation to compete at the 1998 Winter Olympics in Nagano, Japan from 7–22 February 1998. The delegation consisted of a single athlete Marcelo Apovian, who competed in alpine skiing. Making his second Olympic appearance, he finished his only event, the men's super-G in 37th place, last among those who finished the race.

== Background ==
The Brazilian Olympic Committee was recognized by the International Olympic Committee (IOC) on 1 January 1935, 21 years after its creation. Brazil first joined Olympic Competition at the 1900 Summer Olympics, and made their first Winter Olympics appearance in 1992. Therefore, the 1998 Winter Olympics were their third appearance at a Winter Olympic Games. The 1998 Games were held from 7–22 February 1998; a total of 2,176 athletes took part, representing 72 National Olympic Committees. The only athlete sent by Brazil to the Nagano Olympics was Marcelo Apovian, an alpine skier. He was chosen as the flagbearer for the opening ceremony.

== Competitors ==
The following is the list of number of competitors in the Games.

Sport	Men	Women	Total
Alpine skiing	1	0	1
Total	1	0	1

== Alpine skiing ==
Marcelo Apovian was 25 years old at the time of the Nagano Olympics, and was making his second Olympic appearance, having previously represented Brazil at the 1992 Winter Olympics six years prior. The only event he was entered into was the super-G, held on 16 February as a one-leg race. He finished the race in 1 minute and 49.43 seconds, which put him in 37th and last place among all classified finishers. The gold medal was won in a time of 1 minute and 34.82 seconds, by Hermann Maier of Austria. The silver was shared by fellow Austrian Hans Knauß and Swiss racer Didier Cuche.

Athlete	Event	Total	
Athlete	Event	Time	Rank
Marcelo Apovian	Super-G	1:49.43	37
