= Modern pentathlon at the 2015 Pan American Games – Qualification =

== Qualification system ==
A total of 50 modern pentathletes will qualify to compete at the Games (28 male and 22 female). A nation may enter a maximum of six athletes (three male and three female). The host nation (Canada) is automatically qualified with a team of one athlete per gender, and can qualify additional competitors. All countries competing at the 2014 South American Games and 2014 Central American and Caribbean Games along with the United States and hosts Canada will be able to enter one athlete per event. All remaining spots will be allocated to countries' second-place finishing athletes at the Pan American Championships. If there are spots still available, countries will be awarded a third quota until no more spots are available.

== Qualification timeline ==
| Event | Date | Venue |
|---|---|---|
| 2014 South American Games | March 8–10, 2014 | (Chile) Santiago |
| 2014 Pan American Championship | July 17–20, 2014 | Mexico City |
| 2014 Central American and Caribbean Games | November 15–18, 2014 | (Mexico) Veracruz |

== Qualification summary ==
| Nation | Men | Women | Total |
|---|---|---|---|
| Argentina | 2 | 2 | 4 |
| Brazil | 2 | 3 | 5 |
| Canada | 2 | 3 | 5 |
| Chile | 2 | 2 | 4 |
| Costa Rica | 1 | | 1 |
| Cuba | 2 | 2 | 4 |
| Dominican Republic | 2 | 1 | 3 |
| Ecuador | 2 | 1 | 3 |
| Guatemala | 2 | 2 | 4 |
| Mexico | 2 | 2 | 4 |
| Panama | 2 | 1 | 3 |
| Peru | 2 | 1 | 3 |
| Puerto Rico | | 1 | 1 |
| United States | 2 | 2 | 4 |
| Uruguay | 1 | | 1 |
| Venezuela | 2 | | 2 |
| Total: 16 NOCs | 28 | 22 | 50 |

== Men ==
| Competition | Vacancies | Qualified |
|---|---|---|
| Host nation | 1 | Canada |
| Qualified automatically | 1 | United States |
| 2014 South American Games | 8 | Brazil; Chile; Argentina; Venezuela; Ecuador; Panama; Peru; Uruguay |
| 2014 Central American and Caribbean Games | 5 | Costa Rica; Cuba; Dominican Republic; Guatemala; Mexico |
| 2014 Pan American Championship | 13 | Mexico; Cuba; United States; Guatemala; Argentina; Brazil; Ecuador; Canada; Venezuela; Chile; Peru; Dominican Republic; Panama |
| Total | 28 | |

== Women ==
| Competition | Vacancies | Qualified |
|---|---|---|
| Host nation | 1 | Canada |
| Qualified automatically | 1 | United States |
| 2014 South American Games | 7 | Brazil; Chile; Argentina; ~~Venezuela~~; Panama; Ecuador; Peru |
| 2014 Central American and Caribbean Games | 4 | Cuba; Dominican Republic; Guatemala; Mexico |
| 2014 Pan American Championship | 9 | Canada; Mexico; Brazil; United States; Argentina; Guatemala; Chile; Cuba; Puerto Rico |
| Total | 22 | |
