= Hentsch (surname) =

Hentsch is a surname. Notable people with the surname include:

- Jürgen Hentsch (1936–2011), German actor
- Nikolai Hentsch (born 1983), Brazilian alpine skier
- Richard Hentsch, German military officer and aide to Helmuth von Moltke the Younger at the First Battle of the Marne
- Thierry Hentsch (1944–2005), Swiss-Canadian philosopher and political scientist
