= IBSF Pan American Championships =

Main bobsleigh and skeleton championships in the Americas

- Status: active
- Genre: sports event
- Date: November–March
- Frequency: annual
- Inaugurated: 2024
- Most recent: IBSF Pan American Championships 2025
- Next event: IBSF Pan American Championships 2026
- Organiser: IBSF

The IBSF Pan American Championships are the principle annual bobsleigh and skeleton championships specifically for athletes in the Americas region. The first Championships were held in the 2024 season. The Championships are held on an annual basis within a preselected IBSF World Cup or IBSF North America Cup event, in the so-called race-in-race mode for each discipline. The results of non-Americas athletes at these North America Cup stages (which are otherwise, notwithstanding the name, open races including athletes from all continents) are not counted for the purposes of the Pan American Championships standings.

== Editions ==
Like most winter sports, the international season in bobsleigh and skeleton is held across two calendar years, to mirror the winter season in the traditional northern hemisphere heartlands of the sport (North America, Europe and far east Asia) and the Pan American Championships mirror that arrangement. Since its introduction in 2024 the event has generally been split either side of the New year, and shared by the venues at Lake Placid in New York State, in the United States, and Whistler in British Columbia, Canada. However, the winners of both events are considered the champions of the latter year - i.e. Champions crowned in the event at the end of 2024 are effectively considered the 2025 Pan American champions in that event). Notwithstanding this arrangement, athletes from the South American nations of Brazil and Colombia, and the Caribbean nations of Jamaica and the U.S. Virgin Islands, have won a number of medals.

Edition	Season	Year	Discipline	Venue	Events
I	2023-24	2024	Bobsleigh & Skeleton	(United States) Lake Placid	6
II	2024-25	2024	Bobsleigh	(Canada) Whistler	4
II	2024-25	2025	Skeleton	(United States) Lake Placid	2
III	2025-26	2025	Skeleton	(Canada) Whistler	2
III	2025-26	2026	Bobsleigh	(United States) Lake Placid	4

== Bobsleigh ==
=== Four-man ===
Event	Gold		Silver		Bronze	
2024 Lake Placid one run	Canada; Taylor Austin; Shaq Murray-Lawrence; Anthony Couturier; DeVaughn McEwan	55.12	United States 1 Frank del Duca; Joshua Williamson; Adrian Adams; Manteo Mitchell	55.19	United States 2 Kristopher Horn; Jace Johnson; Hakeem Abdul-Saboor; Darius Joseph	55.26
2025 Whistler two runs	Canada 1 Taylor Austin; Shane Ohrt; Mark Zanette; Yohan Eskrick-Parkinson	1:43.92	Canada 2 Cyrus Gray; Shaq Murray-Lawrence; Chris Holmstead; Davidson Henrique De Souza	1:44.46	Brazil; Edson Bindilatti; Edson Martins; Erick Vianna; Rafael Souza Da Silva	1:44.49
2026 Lake Placid	United States; Grady Mercer; Quinten Arello; Hakeem Abdul-Saboor; Adrian Adams	1:50.90 (55.38/55.52)	Canada; Jay Dearborn; Kenny-Luketa M'Pindou; Chris Holmstead; Tobi Ade	1:51.19 (55.63/55.56)	Brazil; Edson Bindilatti; André Luiz da Silva; Edson Martins; Tauler Zatti	1:51.58 (55.73/55.85)

=== Two-man ===
Event	Gold		Silver		Bronze	
2024 Lake Placid; Two runs	United States 1 Frank del Duca; Manteo Mitchell	1:50.96	United States 2 Kristopher Horn; Joshua Williamson	1:51.16	Canada 1 Taylor Austin; Shaq Murray-Lawrence	1:51.39
2025 Whistler; Two runs	Canada 1 Taylor Austin; Shane Ohrt	1:46.18	United States; Geoffrey Gadbois; Collin Storms	1:46.47	Canada 2 Pat Norton; Keaton Bruggeling	1:46.74
2026 Lake Placid; Two runs	Jamaica 1 Shane Pitter; Junior Harris	1:52.71	Brazil 1 Edson Luques Bindilatti; Tauler Zatti	1:52.89	United States 1 Grady Mercer; Bryce Cheek	1:53.03

=== Two-woman ===
Event	Gold		Silver		Bronze	
2024 Lake Placid; Two runs	United States 1 Elana Meyers Taylor; Emily Renna	1:54.53	United States 2 Kaysha Love; Azaria Hill	1:54.62	Canada; Cynthia Appiah; Morgan Ramsay	1:55.21
2025 Whistler two runs	Canada 1 Bianca Ribi; Niamh Haughey	1:47.54	Canada 2 Erica Voss; Eden Wilson	1:47.80	Canada 3 Kristen Bujnowski; Charlotte Ross	1:47.97
2026 Lake Placid; Two runs	Canada 1 Bianca Ribi; Brynn McNabb	1:54.91 (57.18/57.73)	Jamaica; Mica Moore; Audra Segree	1:55.92 (57.63/58.29)	Canada 2 Erica Voss; Ariane Chiasson	1:56.28 (58.05/58.23)

=== Women's Monobob ===
Event	Gold		Silver		Bronze	
2024 Lake Placid two runs	Elana Meyers Taylor; United States	1:58.91	Cynthia Appiah; Canada	1:59.13	Kaysha Love; United States	1:59.32
2025 Whistler two runs	Bianca Ribi; Canada	1:53.10	Erica Voss; Canada	1:53.11	Mackenzie Stewart; Canada	1:54.05
2026 Lake Placid two runs	Bianca Ribi; Canada	2:00.20	Erica Voss; Canada	2:01.07	Mica Moore; Jamaica	2:01.39

== Skeleton ==
=== Men's individual ===
Event	Gold		Silver		Bronze	
2024 Lake Placid two runs	Austin Florian; United States	1:48.32	Daniel Barefoot; United States	1:48.96	Hunter Williams; United States	1:49.57
2025 Lake Placid two runs	Bradley Nicol; United States	1:50.39	Ryan Kuehn; Canada	1:51.51	Josip Brusic; Canada	1:51.85
2026 Whistler two runs	Josip Brusic; Canada	1:48.64	Ryan Kuehn; Canada	1:49.20	Zander Greco; Canada	1:50.22

=== Women's individual ===
Event	Gold		Silver		Bronze	
2024 Lake Placid two runs	Mystique Ro; United States	1:50.35	Katie Uhlaender; United States	1:50.61	Sara Roderick; United States	1:51.24
2025 Lake Placid two runs	Nicole Rocha Silveira; Brazil	1:50.91	Hallie Clarke; Canada	1:51.55	Jane Channell; Canada	1:51.84
2026 Whistler two runs	Laura Vargas; Colombia	1:54.41	Katie Tannenbaum; U.S. Virgin Islands	1:54.47	Liesel Baker; United States	1:56.70

== Overall Medal table ==
Rank	Nation	Gold	Silver	Bronze	Total
1	Canada	8	9	9	26
2	United States	7	6	6	19
3	Brazil	1	1	2	4
4	Jamaica	1	1	1	3
5	Colombia	1	0	0	1
6	U.S. Virgin Islands	0	1	0	1
Totals (6 entries)		18	18	18	54
