= Fábio Gonçalves Silva =

Brazilian bobsledder

Fábio Silva
Personal information
- Full name: Fábio Gonçalves Silva
- Born: 27 March 1977 (age 48) Brasília, Brazil
- Height: 178 cm (5 ft 10 in)
- Weight: 93 kg (205 lb)

Sport
- Country: Brazil; Canada
- Sport: Bobsleigh
- Event: Four-man

Fábio Gonçalves Silva (Note: This name uses Portuguese naming customs: the first or maternal family name is Gonçalves and the second or paternal family name is Silva.) (born 27 March 1977) is a bobsledder from Brazil. He competed for Brazil at the 2014 Winter Olympics in the four-man competition where he placed in 29th position out of 30 teams along with (Edson Bindilatti, Edson Martins and Odirlei Pessoni).
