= Josip Brusic =

Croatian-Canadian skeleton racer

Personal information
- Born: May 25, 2002 (age 24) Rijeka, Croatia
- Home town: Okotoks, Alberta, Canada

Sport
- Country: Canada
- Sport: Skeleton

Josip Brusic (Brusić, born May 25, 2002) is Croatian skeleton racer who represents Canada. He competed at the mixed team event of the 2026 Winter Olympics in pair with Jane Channell, finishing 15th as well as in the men's event, finishing 24th. He won gold medal in men's individual event at the 2026 IBSF Pan American Championships in Whistler, as well as bronze medal at the 2025 edition in Lake Placid.

He was born in Rijeka.
