= Yane Marques =

Brazilian modern pentathlete

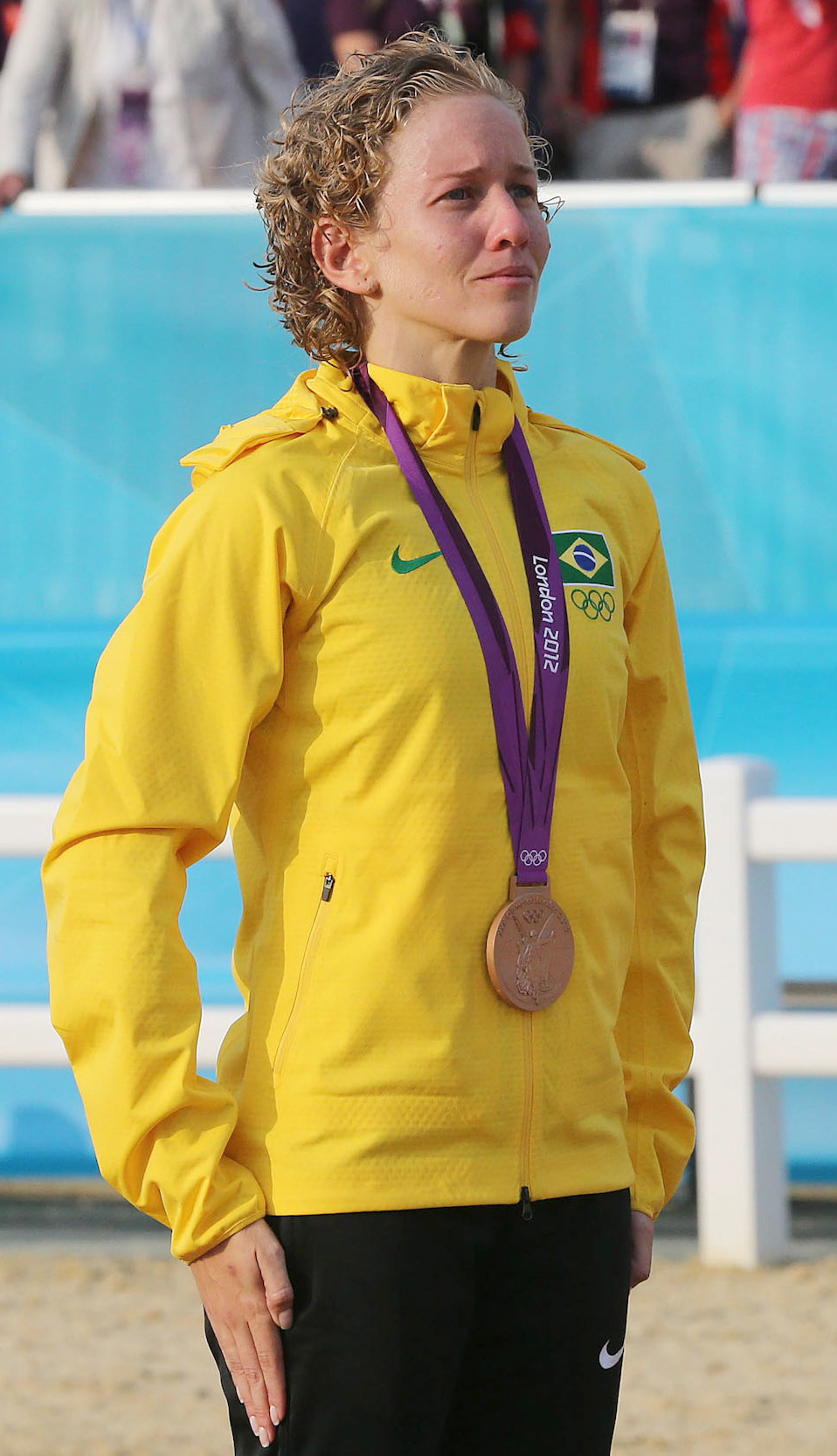
- Marques with her bronze medal, at the 2012 Summer Olympics

Personal information
- Born: Yane Márcia Campos da Fonseca Marques; January 7, 1984 (age 42) Afogados da Ingazeira, Pernambuco, Brazil
- Height: 1.66 m (5 ft 5 1/2 in)
- Weight: 51 kg (112 lb)

Sport
- Country: Brazil
- Sport: Modern Pentathlon
Medal record
Olympic Games
Bronze medal – third place	2012 London	Individual
World Championships
Silver medal – second place	2013 Kaohsiung	Individual
Bronze medal – third place	2015 Berlin	Individual
World Cup Final
Silver medal – second place	2009 Rio de Janeiro	Individual
Bronze medal – third place	2012 Chengdu	Individual
Pan American Games
Gold medal – first place	2007 Rio de Janeiro	Individual
Gold medal – first place	2015 Toronto	Individual
Silver medal – second place	2011 Guadalajara	Individual
Pan American Sports Festival
Gold medal – first place	2014 Mexico City	Individual
South American Games
Gold medal – first place	2014 Santiago	Individual
Military World Games
Gold medal – first place	2011 Rio de Janeiro	Relay
Silver medal – second place	2011 Rio de Janeiro	Individual
Silver medal – second place	2015 Mungyeong	Mixed relay
Bronze medal – third place	2011 Rio de Janeiro	Mixed relay

Yane Márcia Campos da Fonseca Marques (born January 7, 1984, in Afogados da Ingazeira) is a modern pentathlon athlete from Brazil. She became nationally known despite the obscurity of her sport in the country after winning a bronze medal at the 2012 Summer Olympics, the first Latin American to medal and the only woman to do so.

== Biography ==
Hailing from the Sertão of the Brazilian state of Pernambuco, Marques moved to the state capital Recife at the age of 11 so her older siblings could attend college. One year later, she became a swimmer for Clube Náutico Capibaribe, where she competed alongside future Olympian Joanna Maranhão. Marques change of sport occurred in 2003, when she was invited to a biathle competition held by Pernambuco's recently inaugurated modern pentathlon federation, part of the then-new Brazilian confederation's plan to spread the sport. Marques won, and was invited by confederation founder Alexandre França to become a pentathlete. Just one year after changing to modern pentathlon, with França as part of her coaching staff, Marques was Brazilian and South American champion.

The gold medal in the 2007 Pan American Games, held in Rio de Janeiro, qualified Marques for her Olympian debut at the 2008 Summer Olympics, where she finished 18th overall. The following year, Marques joined the Brazilian Army to gain the scholarship and training facilities reserved for military sportspeople. Marques wound up topping the Brazilian pentathlon rankings in 2010, and became 3rd in the world in 2011, where she was a silver medalist at the Pan American Games and three medals at the Military World Games.

Arriving at the 2012 Summer Olympics with medal expectations, Marques started with a 6th place in fencing, jumped to second following swimming and kept the position following the show jumping. The combined running/shooting closer had Marques win the bronze, Brazil's final medal in those Olympics. Following the Games, Marques rose to 2nd in the world rankings, preceded only by gold medallist Laura Asadauskaitė of Lithuania.

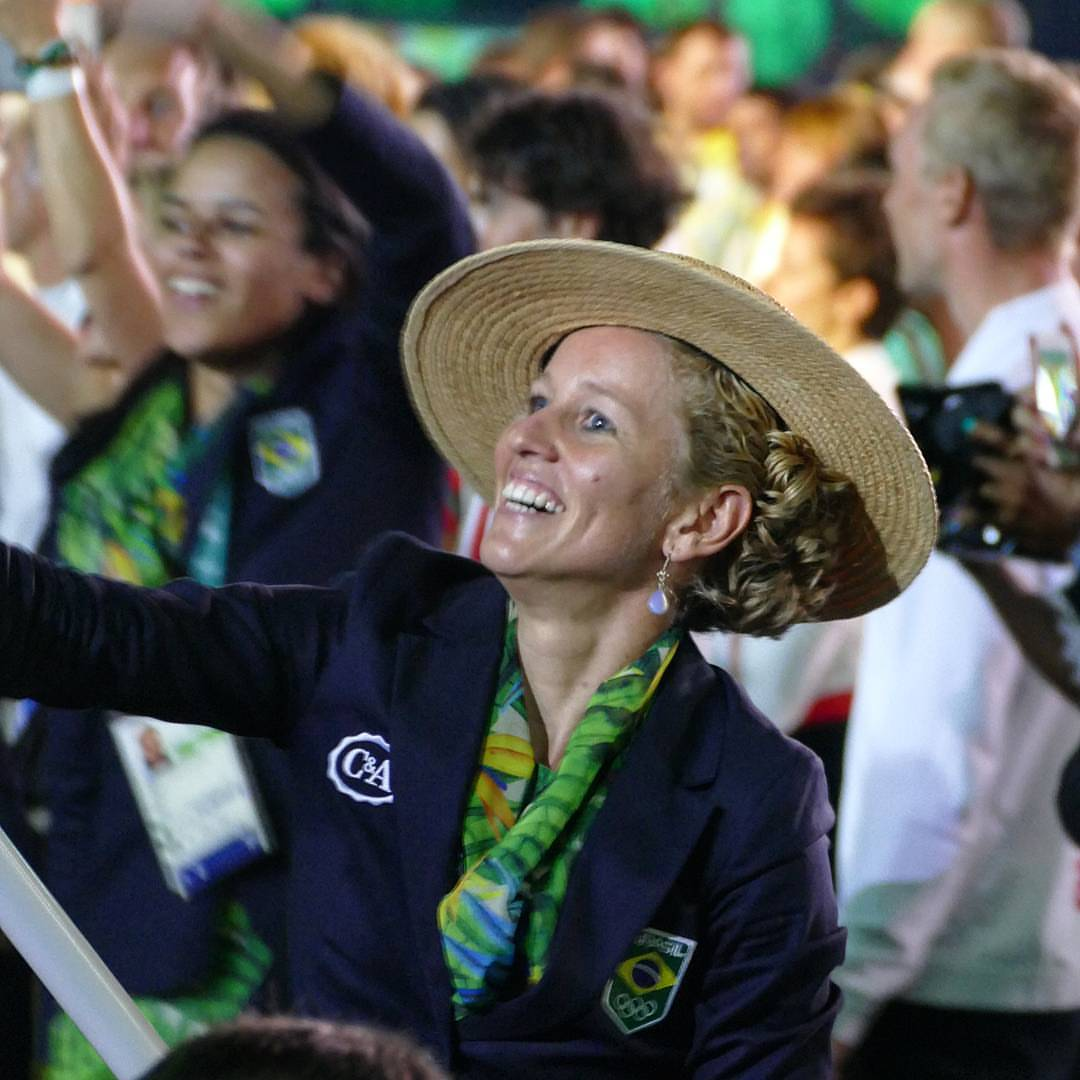
Yane Marques carrying the Brazilian flag at the 2016 Parade of Nations.

Marques was chosen through popular vote to be the flagbearer of Brazil for the opening ceremony of the 2016 Summer Olympics, which the country would host in Rio de Janeiro. She was only the second woman to hold the honor following Sandra Pires. With bad results in the fencing, Yane finished at 23rd in the modern pentathlon. Despite that, she expressed no regrets in the results, particularly as Marques' pentathlon performances helped spread her sport.

Marques holds a degree at physical education at Recife's UNINASSAU. She is married to a fellow pentathlete, Aloísio Sandes.

Olympic Games
Preceded by Jaqueline Mourão	Flagbearer for Brazil; Rio de Janeiro 2016	Succeeded by Edson Bindilatti
