= Ketleyn Quadros =

Brazilian judoka (born 1987)

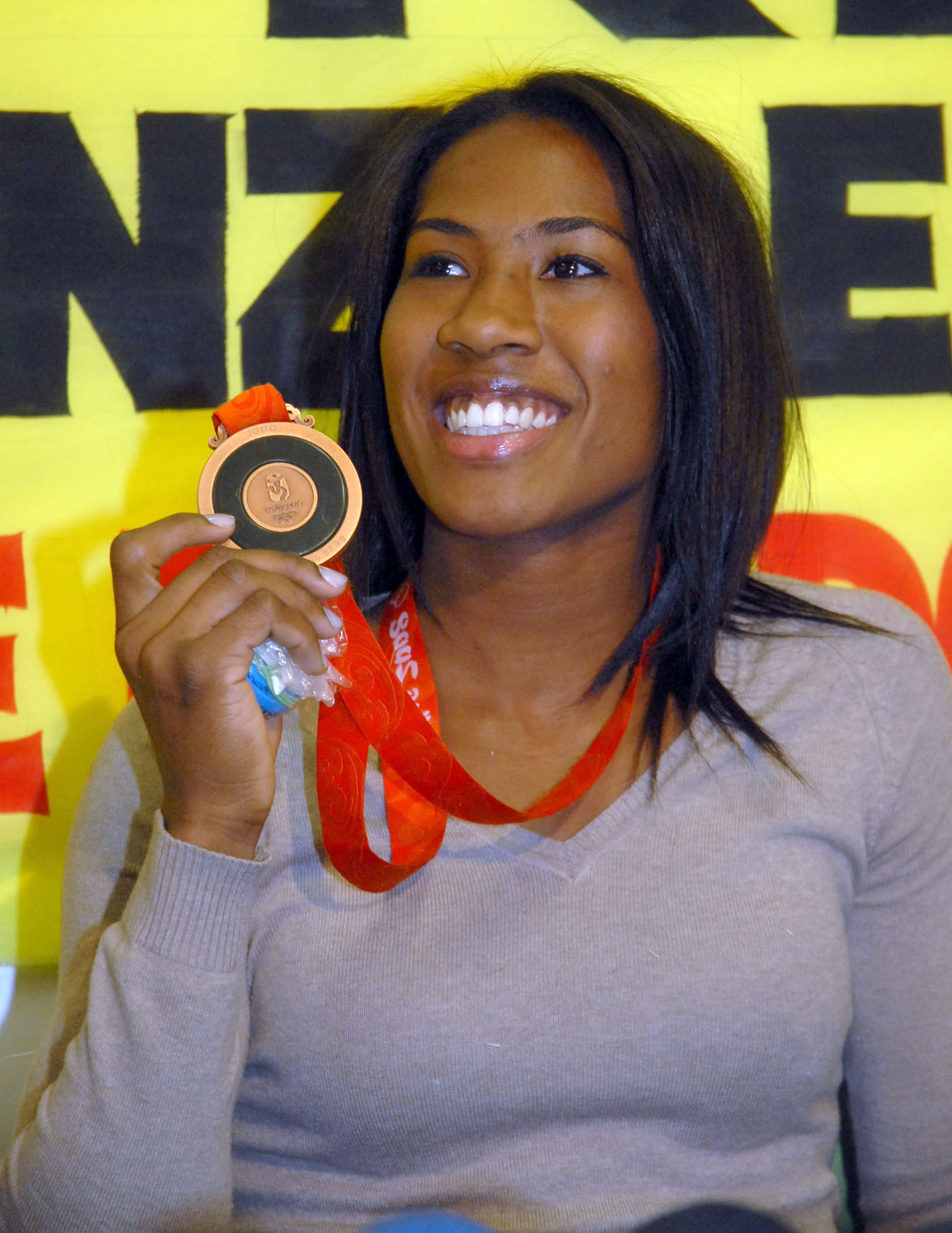
- Quadros in 2008

Personal information
- Born: 1 October 1987 (age 38) Ceilândia, Federal District, Brazil
- Occupation: Judoka

Sport
- Country: Brazil
- Sport: Judo
- Weight class: –63 kg

Achievements and titles
- World Champ.: 5th (2021)
- Pan American Champ.: (2021)
- Olympic Games: (bronze) (2008)
Medal record
Women's judo
Representing Brazil
Olympic Games
Bronze medal – third place	2008 Beijing	‍–‍57 kg
Bronze medal – third place	2024 Paris	Mixed team
World Championships
Bronze medal – third place	2021 Budapest	Mixed team
Pan American Games
Silver medal – second place	2023 Santiago	Mixed team
Bronze medal – third place	2023 Santiago	‍–‍63 kg
Pan American Championships
Gold medal – first place	2021 Guadalajara	‍–‍63 kg
Bronze medal – third place	2008 Miami	‍–‍57 kg
Bronze medal – third place	2013 San José	‍–‍57 kg
Bronze medal – third place	2014 Guayaquil	‍–‍57 kg
Bronze medal – third place	2020 Guadalajara	‍–‍63 kg
Bronze medal – third place	2024 Rio de Janeiro	‍–‍63 kg
IJF Grand Slam
Gold medal – first place	2019 Brasilia	‍–‍63 kg
Gold medal – first place	2023 Antalya	‍–‍63 kg
Silver medal – second place	2013 Moscow	‍–‍57 kg
Silver medal – second place	2021 Kazan	‍–‍63 kg
Silver medal – second place	2022 Tbilisi	‍–‍63 kg
Bronze medal – third place	2016 Abu Dhabi	‍–‍63 kg
Bronze medal – third place	2019 Abu Dhabi	‍–‍63 kg
Bronze medal – third place	2021 Abu Dhabi	‍–‍63 kg
IJF Grand Prix
Gold medal – first place	2013 Almaty	‍–‍57 kg
Gold medal – first place	2013 Tashkent	‍–‍57 kg
Gold medal – first place	2017 Cancún	‍–‍63 kg
Silver medal – second place	2011 Amsterdam	‍–‍57 kg
Silver medal – second place	2012 Qingdao	‍–‍57 kg
Silver medal – second place	2019 Budapest	‍–‍63 kg
Bronze medal – third place	2012 Abu Dhabi	‍–‍57 kg
Bronze medal – third place	2014 Düsseldorf	‍–‍57 kg
Bronze medal – third place	2022 Zagreb	‍–‍63 kg
Summer Universiade
Gold medal – first place	2013 Kazan	‍–‍57 kg

Profile at external databases
- IJF: 2080
- JudoInside.com: 43346
- Updated on 29 April 2024

Ketleyn Lima Quadros (born 1 October 1987) is a Brazilian judoka. She won a bronze medal in the 57 kg weight class at the 2008 Summer Olympics. She became the first Brazilian woman to win an Olympic medal in an individual sport.

== Personal life ==
Ketleyn was named after American actress Kathleen Turner. When she is not competing, Ketleyn Quadros enjoys traveling, family, friends and barbecue.

== Judo career ==
Quadros started practicing judo at the age of 7 when she saw a class while on the way to swimming class. She competed in judo and swimming until the age of 12 and then switched to judo full-time.

At the 2008 Beijing Olympics, Quadros became the first Brazilian woman to win a medal in the Olympic Games in an individual sport.

In 2021, Ketleyn Quadros won gold at the 2021 Pan American Judo Championships at 63 kilograms. She competed at the 2020 Summer Olympics, being the Brazilian flagbearer at the Parade of Nations alongside Bruno Rezende. At the 2021 Judo Grand Slam Abu Dhabi held in Abu Dhabi, United Arab Emirates, she won one of the bronze medals in her event.

Olympic Games
Preceded by Edson Bindilatti	Flagbearer for Brazil; Tokyo 2020 with Bruno Rezende	Succeeded by Edson Bindilatti; Jaqueline Mourão
