= Taylor Austin =

Canadian bobsledder (born 1990)

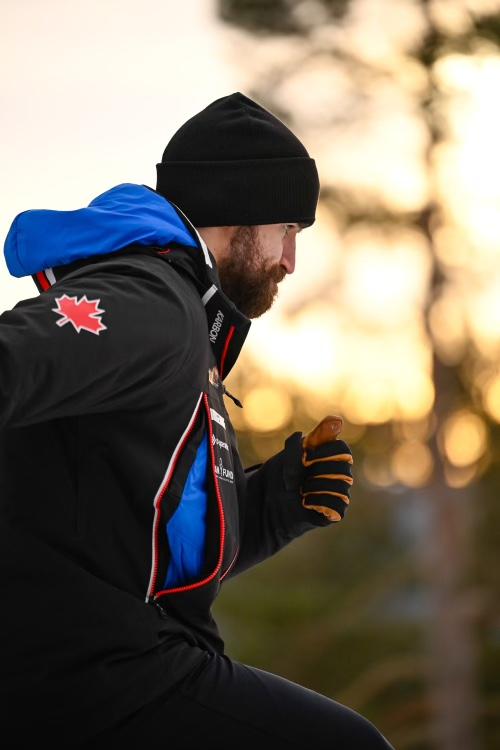
- Austin in 2026

Personal information
- Born: 18 January 1990 (age 36) Lethbridge, Alberta, Canada

Sport
- Country: Canada
- Sport: Bobsleigh
- Events: Two-man, Four-man

Achievements and titles
- Olympic finals: 2026 – Two-man, Milan–Cortina, Italy; 2026 – Four-man, Milan–Cortina Italy; 2022 – Two-man, Beijing, China; 2022 – Four-man, Beijing, China
Medal record
IBSF World Cup
Bronze medal – third place	2022–23 Whistler	Four-man bob
Pan American Championships
Gold medal – first place	2024 Lake Placid	Four-man bob
Gold medal – first place	2025 Whistler	Two-man bob
Gold medal – first place	2025 Whistler	Four-man bob
Bronze medal – third place	2024 Lake Placid	Two-man bob
North American Championships
Gold medal – first place	2021–22 season	Four-man bob overall
Silver medal – second place	2021–22 season	Two-man bob overall
Gold medal – first place	2019–20 season	Four-man bob overall
Gold medal – first place	2019–20 season	Two-man bob overall

Taylor Austin (born 18 January 1990) is a Canadian two-time Olympian bobsleigh pilot who competes in the two-man and four-man events. He has represented Canada at the 2022 Winter Olympics in Beijing and at the 2026 Winter Olympics in Milano-Cortina. Austin is a three-time ISBF Pan American champion.

== Early life ==
Taylor Austin was raised in southern Alberta, before moving to Calgary to pursue competitive athletics. Austin developed an interest in sports at a young age and participated in a variety of athletic activities during his youth. His early athletic interests included team sports such as soccer, where he represented his region at the Alberta Summer Games, a provincial multi-sport event that serves as a major development pathway for young athletes in Alberta. Austin was part of the soccer team that won the gold medal at the Alberta Summer Games, an event designed to showcase emerging amateur athletes from across the province.

As a teenager and young adult, Austin became increasingly involved in football and joined the Calgary Colts. During the 2008–09 football season, Austin earned the Top Scorer Award, recognizing the player who accumulated the most points during league competition. His contributions on and off the field were also recognized by his team during the 2011–12 season when he received the Sharon Lea Leadership Award, an honour presented by the Calgary Colts organization to players who demonstrate exceptional leadership, dedication and commitment to team culture and community.

Austin was recruited to compete in bobsleigh while playing football with the Colts. His football and athletic training translated well to the demands of bobsleigh. After being introduced to the sport, Austin began training seriously and soon moved into competitive sliding.

By the middle of the 2012–13 season, Austin had progressed to piloting his own sled on the International Bobsleigh and Skeleton Federation (IBSF) North American Cup circuit, marking the beginning of his international bobsleigh career.

== Career ==
=== North American Championships ===
While playing football with the Calgary Colts, Austin was recruited to compete on the International Bobsleigh and Skeleton Federation (IBSF) North American Cup circuit during the 2012–13 season. Within the following seasons as a pilot he earned podium finishes in both the two-man and four-man events on the North American circuit between 2014/15 and 2018/19 seasons.

During the 2019–20 season Austin won the overall North American Cup standings in both the two-man and four-man disciplines, finishing first in 11 of the 16 races that season.

Austin continued to compete on the North American Cup circuit in subsequent seasons, recording additional race victories and podium finishes. His performances during the 2021–22 season contributed to his selection to represent Canada at the 2022 Winter Olympics.

=== Pan American Championships ===
Representing Canada, Austin won multiple titles in the IBSF Pan American Championships in both the two-man and four-man events.

At the 2024 Pan American Championships in Lake Placid he won the gold medal in the four-man event and the bronze medal in the two-man competition.

At the 2025 Pan American Championships in Whistler he won gold medals in both the two-man and four-man events. With three championship titles overall, Austin became the most successful athlete, male or female, in the history of the Pan American Championships.

=== World Cup ===
Austin won his first IBSF World Cup medal during the 2022–23 season when his four-man sled captured bronze. Through to the 2025/26 World Cup season he has achieved multiple top-ten finishes including four top-six results.

He continued competing on the IBSF World Cup circuit in subsequent seasons while also representing Canada at the IBSF World Championships. His results at the World Championships included multiple successful finishes, with a career-best eighth place in the four-man event in 2025.

=== Olympics ===
In January 2022, Austin was named to Canada's 2022 Olympic team. Austin was selected to represent Canada at the 2022 Winter Olympics in Beijing. Competing as pilot in the two-man and four-man bobsleigh events, he finished 20th in the two-man competition and 23rd in the four-man event.

Austin represented Canada again at the 2026 Winter Olympics in Milan–Cortina. At the 2026 Olympics he placed 18th in the two-man event and 14th in the four-man competition.

== Modern Media ==
Taylor Austin, Canadian bobsleigh pilot and leader of the men's team, is featured in the CBC documentary series Bobsleigh Betrayal, Redemption Run episode 2, which chronicles the Canadian bobsleigh program's journey leading up to the 2026 Winter Olympics in Milano Cortina. The documentary series provides an in-depth look at the athletes, coaches and broader program as they navigate the challenges of elite competition, team dynamics, outdated equipment and the quest for Olympic success.

CBC's Bobsleigh Betrayal, captures a pivotal period for Bobsleigh Canada Skeleton (BCS) and its athletes as they strive to retain international competitiveness after several seasons marked by change and adversity. The series blends behind-the-scenes access, candid interviews with Taylor Austin and moments on and off the ice track to tell the story of a program seeking to rebuild and redefine itself.

Within CBC's narrative, Austin is presented not only as a high performing athlete but also as a figure in the Canadian men's program's evolution. The documentary identifies Austin as Canada's number one pilot and discusses Austin's leadership, resilience, patience and commitment to excellence as recurring themes throughout. Viewers see Austin supporting new teammates, navigating the pressures of World Cup competition and contributing to a collective effort to push Canada's bobsleigh teams back toward medal contention at the Olympic-medal level.

Bobsleigh Betrayal highlights the preparation and determination that define elite winter sport, showcasing training sessions at facilities in Whistler and abroad, as well as the challenges of international travel, financial constraints, equipment logistics and competition across Europe. Austin's presence is instrumental in contextualizing the men's side of the program, where the pursuit of Olympic qualification and peak performance is made visible through both triumphs and setbacks.

CBC's Bobsleigh Betrayal illustrates the personal and professional sacrifices required to pursue excellence in the demanding sport of bobsleigh. Austin's experience resonates, framing the narrative around persistence, adaptation, tolerance and collective aspiration. The series underscores how athletes like Austin balance their competitive ambitions with mentorship roles, helping guide emerging talent while contributing to a cohesive team culture.

This documentary situates these individual stories within the larger context of Canada's bobsleigh heritage and efforts to elevate the national program. Scenes from World Cup races, physical training, practice runs and team meetings portray the multifaceted nature of elite sled sport, with Austin's perspective offering insight into the mindset and preparation that characterize world class pilots.

CBC's Bobsleigh Betrayal balances Austin's athletic calibre and his role in fostering a renewed sense of purpose and direction within Canada's bobsleigh community with reoccurring themes of resilience and collective endeavour on the road to the 2026 Olympic Games in Italy.

== Community ==
Beyond his competitive career, Austin has been involved in coaching and community outreach related to sport participation and athlete development. He has led "learn-to-push" camps for aspiring athletes and has participated in public bobsleigh programs at the tracks in Whistler and Calgary, where introductory sessions allow members of the public to experience the sport and learn basic push-start techniques.

Austin has also served as Vice-President of the Board of Directors for the Alberta Bobsleigh Association, supporting athlete development, governance, and program planning and improvement at the provincial level. He also volunteers as an athlete ambassador with KidSport Calgary, a national non-profit organization that helps remove financial barriers so children can participate in organized sport programs.

In addition to his role with Alberta Bobsleigh, Austin has participated in community outreach activities including mentoring students and presenting at schools to promote physical activity and encourage youth participation in sport and recreation. He has also volunteered with Whistler Sport Legacies, an organization established following the 2010 Winter Olympics to operate and maintain Olympic venues while promoting sport participation and athlete development programs.

Austin has also volunteered with CUPS (Calgary Urban Project Society), a Calgary-based non-profit organization that provides integrated health care, housing support and social services to individuals and families experiencing poverty.

Over a number of years, Austin, with members of his family, has also volunteered with Habitat for Humanity, an international non-profit organization that works with volunteers and partner families to build and improve affordable housing in communities around the world.

== Honours ==
In 2022, Austin was inducted into the Lethbridge Sports Hall of Fame and was named the Canada Kinsmen Sportsperson of the Year (multi-sport) Austin has also been recognized through Canadian Athletes Now, which supports Canadian high-performance athletes.

Earlier in his athletic career, Austin received a gold medal at the Alberta Summer Games (soccer) and the Highest Scorer Award while playing football in 2008. In 2012, he was presented with the Sharon Lea Award for Leadership and Dedication to the Community, recognizing his involvement in volunteer initiatives in Alberta.
