= Shane Pitter =

Jamaican bobsledder (born 1999)

Personal information
- Nationality: Jamaican
- Born: 2 November 1999 (age 26)

Sport
- Country: Jamaica
- Sport: Bobsleigh
- Events: Two-man, Four-man
Medal record
Men's bobsleigh
Representing Jamaica
Pan American Championships
Gold medal – first place	2026 Lake Placid	Two-man
Junior Pan American Championships
Bronze medal – third place	2024 Park City	Two-man

Shane Pitter (born 2 November 1999) is a Jamaican bobsledder. He represented Jamaica at the 2026 Winter Olympics.

== Career ==
Prior to bobsled, Pitter worked primarily as a fisherman. Pitter made vlogs about his fishing under the title "Catching Crab With the Family. Monster Crab Catch". He was recruited to bobsleigh by a friend, despite Pitter having no previous knowledge of the sport. In 2023, he began competing in the IBSF's North America Cup. In 2025, he became the first Jamaican pilot to win an IBSF event, winning the four-man competition at Whistler in Canada. Pitter and the Jamican team would end the 2025–26 season with a total of eight medals in the North America Cup.

In 2026, Pitter with brakeman Junior Harris won the IBSF Pan American Championships in two-man.

Prior to the 2026 Olympics, Jamaica's bobsled federation president Chris Stokes stated that Pitter was possibly the best young pilot for Jamaica in the nation's bobsled history.

Pitter was selected to represent Jamaica in bobsled in both two-man and four-man competition. He finished 22nd in the two-man and 21st in the four-man.

== Personal life ==
Pitter lives in Spanish Town, Jamaica. Pitter continues to enjoy fishing, including spearfishing.

After starting bobsledding, Pitter has cited the 1988 Jamaican Bobsled team and the related film Cool Runnings as sources of inspiration.

== Bobsleigh results ==
All results are sourced from the International Bobsleigh and Skeleton Federation (IBSF).

=== Olympic Games ===
Event	Two-man	Four-man
(Italy) 2026 Milano Cortina	22nd	21st

=== World Championships ===
Event	Two-man	Four-man
(United States) 2025 Lake Placid	25th	—
