= Junior Harris =

Jamaican bobsledder (born 2004)

Personal information
- Nationality: Jamaican
- Born: 23 October 2004 (age 21)

Sport
- Country: Jamaica
- Sport: Bobsleigh
- Events: Two-man, Four-man
Medal record
Men's bobsleigh
Representing Jamaica
IBSF Pan American Championships
Gold medal – first place	2026 Lake Placid	Two-man

Junior Harris (born 23 October 2004) is a Jamaican bobsledder. He represented Jamaica at the 2026 Winter Olympics.

== Career ==
Harris began sports as a track and field athlete, specializing in sprinting. He began competing in bobsleigh in 2025, pushing for the team of Shane Pitter. The team became the first Jamaican bobsleigh team to win an international event after winning a four-man event at Whistler in 2025. In 2026, Pitter and Harris took the gold medal in the two-man event at the IBSF Pan American Championships.

In 2026, Harris was selected to represent Jamaica at the Winter Olympics, pushing for Pitter in both two-man and four-man. The team finished 22nd in the two-man, and tied for 21st in four-man.

== Bobsleigh results ==
=== Olympic Games ===
Event	Two-man	Four-man
(Italy) 2026 Milano Cortina	22nd	21st
