= Luis Bacca Gonçalves =

Brazilian bobsledder (born 1998)

Personal information
- Nationality: Brazilian
- Born: 28 January 1998 (age 28)

Sport
- Country: Brazil
- Sport: Bobsleigh

Achievements and titles
- Olympic finals: 2026

Luis Bacca Gonçalves (born 28 January 1998) is a Brazilian bobsledder. He competed at the 2026 Winter Olympics in two-man bobsleigh, together with Edson Bindilatti, finishing in 24th place. In the four-man bobsleigh, together with Edson Bindilatti, Rafael Souza da Silva and Davidson Henrique de Souza, he finished in 19th place, the best result ever achieved by Brazil in Bobsleigh at the Winter Olympics.
