= Bianca Ribi =

Canadian bobsledder (born 1996)

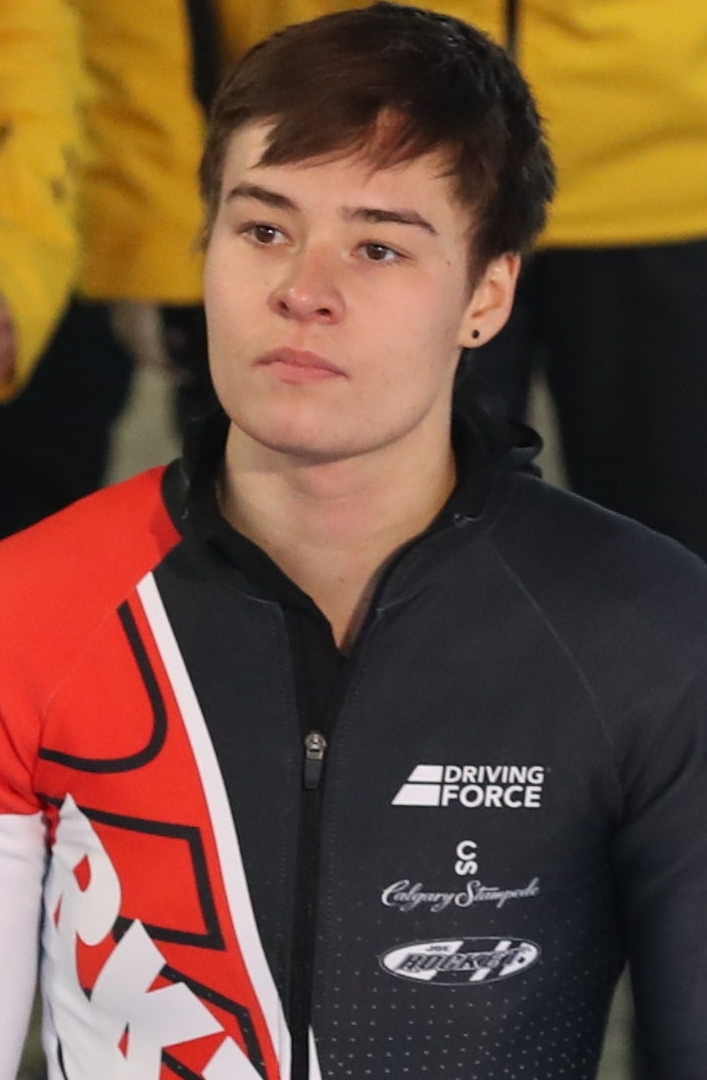
- Ribi at a World Cup event in Altenberg in 2019

Personal information
- Nationality: Canadian
- Born: 27 January 1996 (age 30) Winnipeg, Manitoba, Canada
- Height: 178 cm (5 ft 10 in)
- Weight: 72 kg (159 lb)

Sport
- Country: Canada
- Sport: Bobsleigh
- Events: Monobob, Two-woman
Medal record
Women's bobsleigh
Representing Canada
IBSF Pan American Championships
Gold medal – first place	2025 Whistler	Monobob
Gold medal – first place	2025 Whistler	Two-woman
Gold medal – first place	2026 Lake Placid	Monobob
Gold medal – first place	2026 Lake Placid	Two-woman

Bianca Ribi (born 27 January 1996) is a Canadian bobsledder. She represented Canada at the 2026 Winter Olympics in two-woman.

== Career ==
Prior to bobsleigh, Ribi was a soccer player, and competed in multiple Canadian national championships. She received multiple scholarship offers for collegiate soccer, but decided on Dartmouth College to prioritize her education. She continued to play soccer at Dartmouth, where she played as a forward.

Ribi began bobsledding in 2018, after her father introduced her to Olympic bronze-medalist Lyndon Rush. Ribi made her competitive debut during the 2018–19 season. In 2022, Ribi won the inaugural World Cup event for women's monobob, which to date is her only World Cup win. Ribi earned consecutive gold medals in the IBSF Pan American Championships in both monobob and two-woman, winning both events in 2025 and 2026.

Ribi was selected to represent Canada at the 2026 Winter Olympics as a pilot in the two-woman event. She finished in 11th.

== Personal life ==
Ribi currently resides in Calgary, Alberta. She graduated from Dartmouth College in 2018 with a degree in psychology. Ribi works full-time as a firefighter for the Calgary Fire Department.

== Bobsleigh results ==
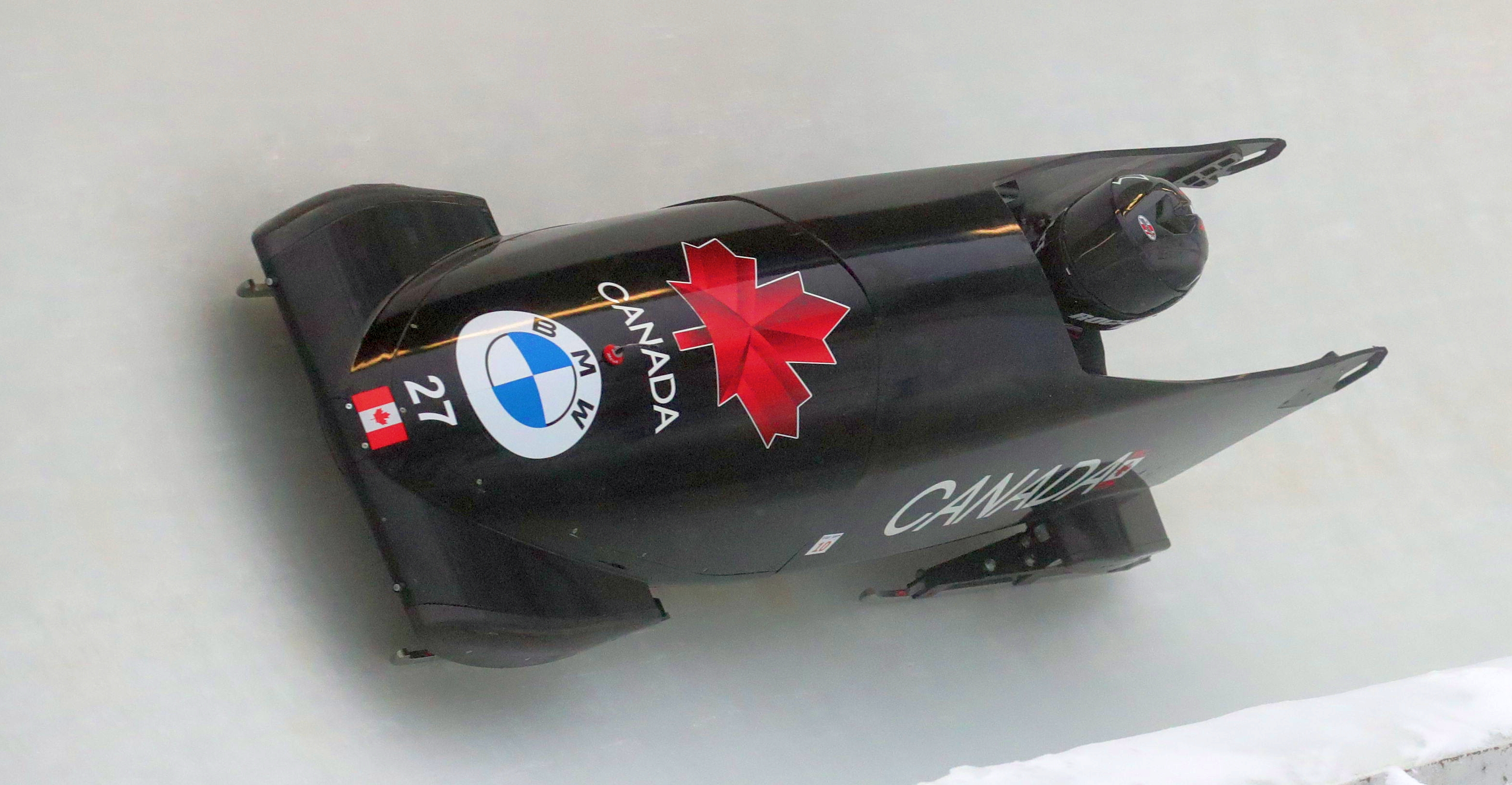
Ribi competing in a monobob event at Altenberg in 2023.

All results are sourced from the International Bobsleigh and Skeleton Federation (IBSF).

=== Olympic Games ===
Event	Two-woman
(Italy) 2026 Milano Cortina	11th

=== World Championships ===
Event	Monobob	Two-woman
(Switzerland) 2023 St. Moritz	9th	13th
(Germany) 2024 Winterberg	17th	9th
(United States) 2025 Lake Placid	—	15th
