= Modern pentathlon at the 2014 South American Games =

There were 3 modern pentathlon events at the 2014 South American Games. This event served as a qualifier 2015 Pan American Games in Toronto, Ontario, Canada.

== Medal summary ==
=== Medal table ===
Rank	Nation	Gold	Silver	Bronze	Total
1	Brazil (BRA)	2	2	1	5
2	Chile (CHI)	1	1	1	3
3	Argentina (ARG)	0	0	1	1
Totals (3 entries)		3	3	3	9

=== Medalists ===
Event	Gold	Silver	Bronze
Men's	Felipe Lima; Brazil	Danilo de Fagundes; Brazil	Esteban Bustos; Chile
Women's	Yane Marques; Brazil	Javiera Ceron; Chile	Priscila Oliveira; Brazil
Mixed relay	Chile	Brazil	Argentina
