= Renato Mizoguchi =

Brazilian luger (born 1975)

Renato Hiromi Gimenez Mizoguchi (Japanese: レナト ひろみ ぎめね 溝口, born September 27 1975 in Bauru, São Paulo) is a Brazilian luger who competed from 2001 to 2005. He is best known for his severe injuries suffered during the homologation process of Cesana Pariol, the bobsleigh, luge, and skeleton track for the 2006 Winter Olympics in Turin, in January 2005. Mizoguchi's injuries led to a donation set up by the International Luge Federation (FIL) in Germany to pay for his expenses and also to track modifications after discussion both by the FIL and the International Bobsleigh and Skeleton Federation during 2005 with approval finally reached in October of that year.

At the 2002 Winter Olympics in Salt Lake City, he finished 46th in the men's singles event. Mizoguchi finished 40th in the same event at the 2004 FIL World Luge Championships in Nagano. His best Luge World Cup finish was 50th in men's singles in 2004-5.

== Personal life ==
Mizoguchi was raised in a Brazilian-Japanese family in the Brazilian state of São Paulo. Following his crash, he was placed in a coma in January 2005, awaking from his coma three weeks later. He was discharged in March 2005. In October 2007, he married his longtime girlfriend from Japan in Tokyo.
