= Odirlei Pessoni =

Brazilian bobsledder (1982–2021)

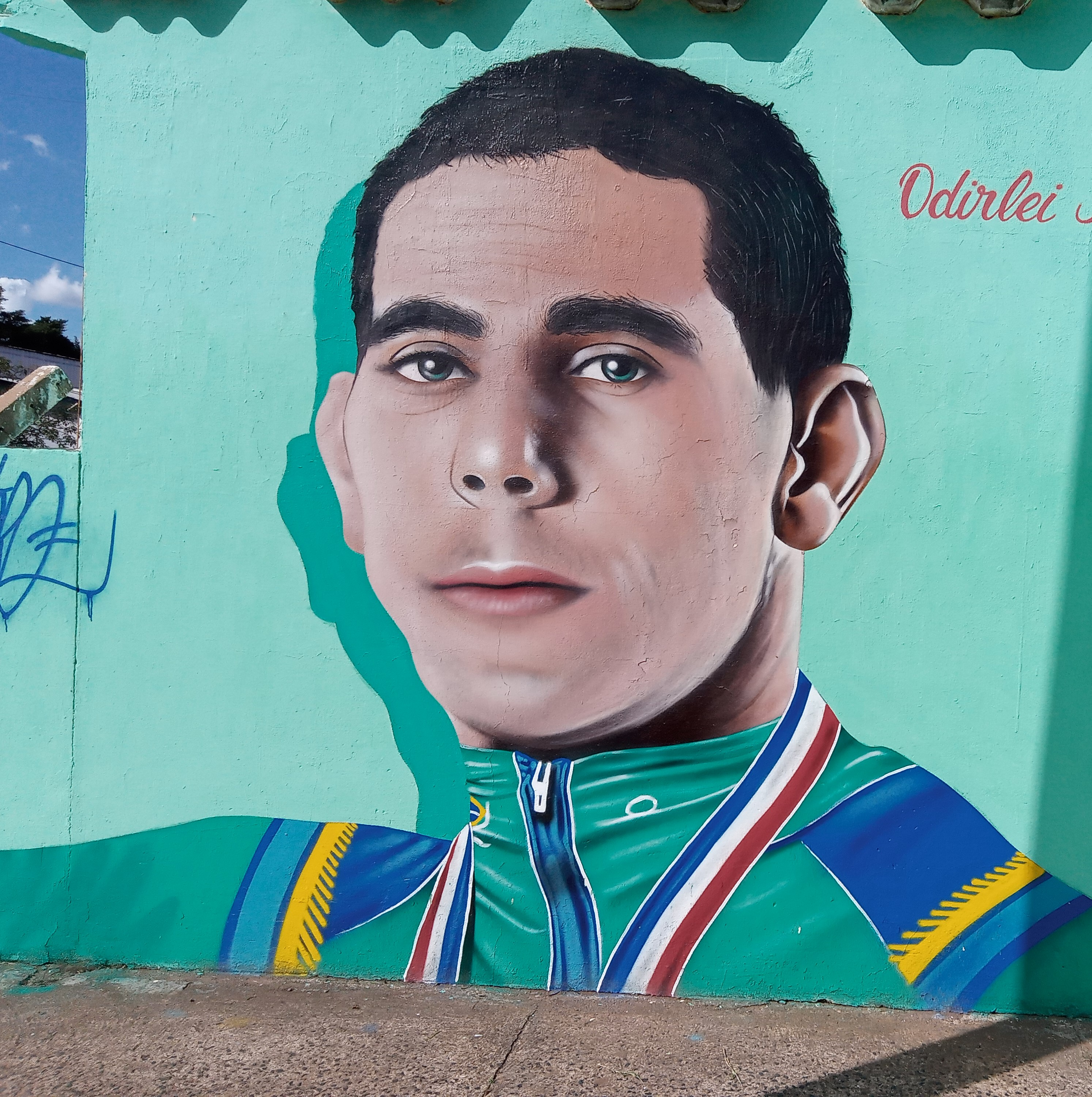

Personal information
- Full name: Odirlei Carlos Pessoni
- Born: 1 July 1982 Franca, São Paulo, Brazil
- Died: 27 March 2021 (aged 38) Ibiraci, Minas Gerais, Brazil
- Height: 1.82 m (6 ft 0 in)
- Weight: 93 kg (205 lb)

Sport
- Country: Brazil
- Sport: Bobsleigh

Odirlei Carlos Pessoni (1 July 1982 – 27 March 2021) was a Brazilian bobsledder. He competed for Brazil at the 2014 Winter Olympics in the four-man competition and at the 2018 Winter Olympics also in the four-man where he placed in 29th position out of 30 teams along with Edson Bindilatti, Edson Martins and Fábio Gonçalves Silva.

Pessoni died in a motorcycle accident on 27 March 2021.
