= Davidson Henrique de Souza =

Brazilian bobsledder (born 1992)

Davidson de Souza
Personal information
- Full name: Davidson Henrique de Souza
- Nickname: Boka
- Born: 17 March 1992 (age 34) Osasco, Brazil

Sport
- Country: Brazil; Canada
- Sport: Bobsleigh
- Event: Four-man

Achievements and titles
- Olympic finals: 2026

Davidson Henrique de Souza (Note: This name uses Portuguese naming customs: the first or maternal family name is Henrique and the second or paternal family name is De Souza.) (born 17 March 1992, in Osasco), commonly known as Davidson de Souza, is a Brazilian bobsledder. He competed for Brazil at the 2026 Winter Olympics in four-man bobsleigh, together with Edson Bindilatti, Rafael Souza da Silva and Luis Bacca Gonçalves, finishing at 19th place, the best result ever achieved by Brazil in Bobsleigh at the Winter Olympics.

De Souza also competed in bobsleigh for Canada.
