= Marcelo Apovian =

Brazilian alpine skier (born 1972)

Personal information
- Born: 21 December 1972 (age 52); São Paulo, Brazil

Sport
- Sport: Alpine skiing

Marcelo Apovian (born 21 December 1972) is a Brazilian alpine skier. He competed at the 1992 Winter Olympics and the 1998 Winter Olympics.

Olympic Games
Preceded by Joaquim Cruz	Flagbearer for Brazil; Nagano 1998	Succeeded by Sandra Pires
