= Ricardo Raschini =

Brazilian bobsledder and luger

Ricardo Raschini (born May 14, 1967 in Capivari) is a Brazilian bobsledder and luger who competed in luge from the late 1990s to the early 2000s and in bobsleigh from 2002 to 2006. At the 2006 Winter Olympics in Turin, he finished 25th in the four-man event.

Raschini also competed as a luger at the 2002 Winter Olympics in Salt Lake City, finishing 45th in the men's singles event. He switched to Skeleton and did not qualify for the Canada 2010 Winter Olympics. He was born in Capivari, Sao Paulo, Brazil, and resides there. He went to ITT Tech, in Framingham, MA and graduated in 1998.
