= Maya Harrisson =

Swiss-Brazilian alpine skier (born 1992)

Personal information
- Nationality: Swiss-Brazilian
- Born: March 3, 1992 (age 33) Duas Barras, Brazil
- Occupation: Medical Student at the University of Geneva
- Height: 5 ft 3 in (160 cm)
- Weight: 119 lb (54 kg)
- Other interests: Surf and Longboard

Sport
- Country: Brazil
- Sport: Alpine skiing
- Partner(s): Nike and Olympikus

Achievements and titles
- Olympic finals: She participated to Vancouver 2010 and Sochi 2014 olympic winter games
- National finals: She won twice the Brazilian Championships

Maya Harrisson (born March 3, 1992) is a Swiss-Brazilian alpine skier who lives in Geneva, Switzerland.

Born in Brazil, she was adopted and spent her childhood in Switzerland, where she discovered skiing. She lives in Geneva and studies at the Haute école de santé to become a Physiotherapist. Thanks to her double nationality (Swiss-Brazilian) she competed for Brazil at the 2010 Winter Olympics at only 17 years old. Four years later she competed in the slalom and giant slalom events at the Sochi 2014 Olympic Games in Russia.
