= Leandro Ribela =

Brazilian cross-country skier (born 1980)

Personal information
- Born: March 22, 1980 (age 46) São Paulo, Brazil
- Height: 6 ft 0 in (183 cm)
- Weight: 176 lb (80 kg)

Sport
- Country: Brazil
- Sport: Cross-country skiing
Medal record
Representing Brazil

Leandro Ribela (born March 22, 1980) is a Brazilian cross-country skier who has competed since 2007. He finished 90th in the 15 km event at the 2010 Winter Olympics in Vancouver, British Columbia, Canada.

At the FIS Nordic World Ski Championships 2009 in Liberec, Ribela finished 117th in the individual sprint while getting lapped in the 30 km mixed pursuit event.

His best career finish was 13th in a 30 km FIS race in Macedonia in January 2010.
