= Mirella Arnhold =

Brazilian alpine skier (born 1983)

Personal information
- Born: 30 May 1983 (age 43) São Paulo, Brazil

Sport
- Sport: Alpine skiing

Mirella Arnhold (born 30 May 1983) is a Brazilian alpine skier. She competed at the 2002 Winter Olympics and the 2006 Winter Olympics.

Arnhold has a degree in public administration from the Getulio Vargas Foundation. She has lived in nine countries: Austria, Argentina, Brazil, Chile, France, Germany, Italy, Switzerland and England. She speaks six languages: Portuguese, English, Spanish, French, Italian and German.

Olympic Games
Preceded by Sandra Pires	Flagbearer for Brazil; Salt Lake 2002	Succeeded by Torben Grael
