= Lothar Christian Munder =

Brazilian alpine skier (born 1962)

Personal information
- Born: 21 July 1962 (age 62); São Paulo, Brazil

Sport
- Sport: Alpine skiing

Lothar Christian Munder (born 21 July 1962) is a Brazilian alpine skier. He competed at the 1992 Winter Olympics and the 1994 Winter Olympics.
