= Edson Martins =

Brazilian bobsledder (born 1989)

Personal information
- Full name: Edson Ricardo Martins
- Born: 4 October 1989 (age 36) São Paulo, Brazil
- Height: 1.87 m (6 ft 2 in)
- Weight: 91 kg (201 lb)
Medal record
Bobsleigh
Representing Brazil
Pan American Championships
Bronze medal – third place	2025 Whistler	Four-man bob

Edson Ricardo Martins (born 4 October 1989 in São Paulo) is a bobsledder from Brazil. He competed for Brazil at the 2014 Winter Olympics in the four-man competition where he placed in 29th position out of 30 teams along with (Edson Bindilatti, Fábio Gonçalves Silva and Odirlei Pessoni).

He qualified to represent Brazil at the 2022 Winter Olympics.
