= Nikolai Hentsch =

Brazilian alpine skier (born 1983)

Personal information
- Nationality: Brazilian
- Born: 10 August 1983 (age 41); Geneva, Switzerland

Sport
- Sport: Alpine skiing

Nikolai Hentsch (born 10 August 1983) is a Swiss/Brazilian dual national and Olympian alpine skier. He competed at the 2002 Winter Olympics and the 2006 Winter Olympics representing Brazil. He was also flagbearer at the 2006 closing ceremony.

Nikolai is Chief Operating Officer (COO) of AREX Markets
