= Rafael Souza da Silva =

Brazilian bobsledder (born 1996)

Personal information
- Nationality: Brazilian
- Born: 22 July 1996 (age 29) Rio de Janeiro, Brazil
- Height: 1.80 m (5 ft 11 in)
- Weight: 84 kg (185 lb)

Sport
- Country: Brazil
- Sport: Bobsleigh

Achievements and titles
- Olympic finals: 2018, 2022, 2026
Medal record
Bobsleigh
Representing Brazil
Pan American Championships
Bronze medal – third place	2025 Whistler	Four-man bob

Rafael Souza da Silva (born 22 July 1996) is a Brazilian bobsledder. He competed in the 2018, 2022 and 2026 Winter Olympics. At the 2026 Winter Olympics in four-man bobsleigh, together with Edson Bindilatti, Davidson Henrique de Souza and Luis Bacca Gonçalves, finished at 19th place, the best result ever achieved by Brazil in Bobsleigh at the Winter Olympics.
