= Edson Bindilatti =

Brazilian decathlete and bobsledder

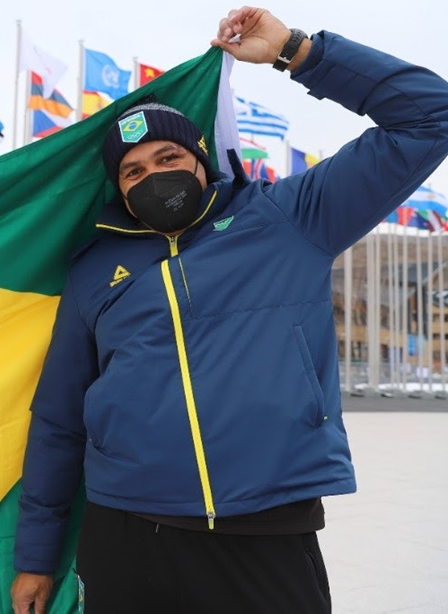
- Bindilatti in 2022

Personal information
- Full name: Edson Luques Bindilatti
- Born: 13 March 1979 (age 47) Camamu, Bahia, Brazil
- Height: 1.90 m (6 ft 3 in)
- Weight: 103 kg (227 lb)

Sport
- Country: Brazil
- Sport: Bobsleigh

Achievements and titles
- Olympic finals: 2002, 2006,2010, 2014,2018, 2022, 2026
Medal record
Bobsleigh
Representing Brazil
Pan American Championships
Silver medal – second place	2026 Lake Placid	Two-man bob
Bronze medal – third place	2025 Whistler	Four-man bob
Bronze medal – third place	2026 Lake Placid	Four-man bob

Edson Luques Bindilatti (Note: This name uses Portuguese naming customs: the first or maternal family name is Luques and the second or paternal family name is Bindilatti.) (born 13 March 1979 in Camamu, Bahia) is a decathlete and bobsledder from Brazil. He competed in 6 consecutive Winter Olympic Games, from 2002 to 2026, a record among Brazilian Olympians.

== Career ==
As a decathlete, Bindilatti won a silver medal at the 1996 South American Junior Championships and then took gold medals at the 1997 and 1998 South American Junior Championships. He took the silver medal at the 1999 South American Championships, then the gold medals at the 2001 and 2003 South Junior Championships, the first gold in a competition record of 7564 points. Against European competitors as well, he won the 2000 Ibero-American Championships and the silver medal at the 2002 Ibero-American Championships. He became the national champion six times, from 1999 through 2004.

Bindilatti took up bobsleigh after being approached by Eric Maleson in 1999: Bindilatti was unfamiliar with the sport and agreed to take it up after Maleson asked him to watch the film Cool Runnings. He competed for Brazil at the 2002 , 2006 and 2010 Winter Olympics

He competed for Brazil at the 2014 Winter Olympics in the four-man competition where he placed in 29th position out of 30 teams along with Fábio Gonçalves Silva, Edson Martins and Odirlei Pessoni.

Bindilatti was selected as flag bearer for the Brazilian team in the opening ceremony of the 2018 Winter Olympics in Pyeongchang. He was part of the Brazilian crews which finished 27th in the two-man and 23rd in the four-man competitions at those Games.

He represented Brazil at the 2022 Winter Olympics in Beijing, China, again as the flag bearer for the Brazilian team in the opening ceremony. In the four-man bobsleigh, together with Erick Vianna, Rafael Souza da Silva and Edson Martins, finishing in 20th place. In the two-man he was in the 29th place .

In his sixth Olympic participation at the 2026 Winter Olympics in Milano Cortina, he competed at the 2026 Winter Olympics in two-man bobsleigh, together with Luis Bacca Gonçalves, finishing in 24th place. In the four-man bobsleigh, together with Luis Bacca Gonçalves, Rafael Souza da Silva and Davidson Henrique de Souza, he finished in 19th place, the best result ever achieved by Brazil in Bobsleigh at the Winter Olympics.. After the competition, Bindilatti announced his retirement of Olympics and was the carrier of the Brazilian flag at the closing ceremony

== Notes ==
Olympic Games
Preceded by Yane Marques	Flagbearer for Brazil; Pyeongchang 2018	Succeeded by Ketleyn Quadros; Bruno Rezende
Preceded by Ketleyn Quadros; Bruno Rezende	Flagbearer for Brazil; Beijing 2022 with Jaqueline Mourão	Succeeded by Raquel Kochhann; Isaquias Queiroz
