= Isabel Clark Ribeiro =

Brazilian snowboarder (born 1976)

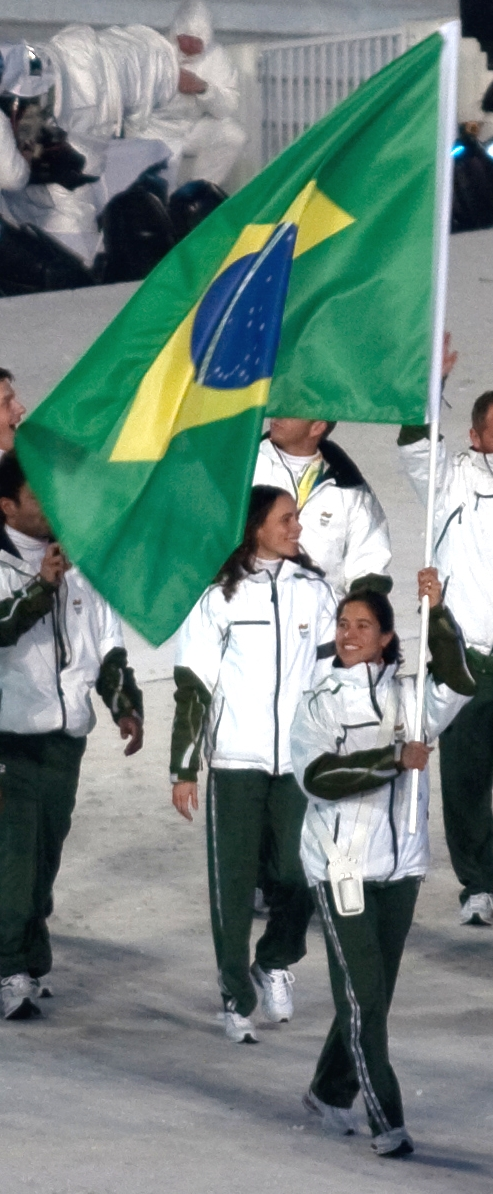
- Isabel Clark Ribeiro at the opening ceremonies of the 2010 Winter Olympics

Personal information
- Born: 24 October 1976 (age 49) Rio de Janeiro, Brazil
- Height: 5 ft 6 in (168 cm)
- Weight: 134 lb (61 kg)

Sport
- Country: Brazil
- Sport: Snowboarding
Medal record
Representing Brazil

Isabel Clark Ribeiro (born 24 October 1976) is a snowboarder from Brazil. She competed in the 2006 Winter Olympics, 2010 Winter Olympics and 2014 Winter Olympics in snowboard cross.

In Turin 2006 she made her Olympic debut and she ranked the 9th position in the Snowboard Cross event. Clark was Brazil's flag bearer during the 2010 Winter Olympics opening ceremony. She qualified for the 2018 Winter Olympics but was injured in an accident during a training session the day before the competition.

Olympic Games
Preceded by Torben Grael	Flagbearer for Brazil; Torino 2006	Succeeded by Robert Scheidt
Preceded by Robert Scheidt	Flagbearer for Brazil; Vancouver 2010	Succeeded by Rodrigo Pessoa
