= Jaqueline Mourão =

Brazilian sportswoman (born 1975)

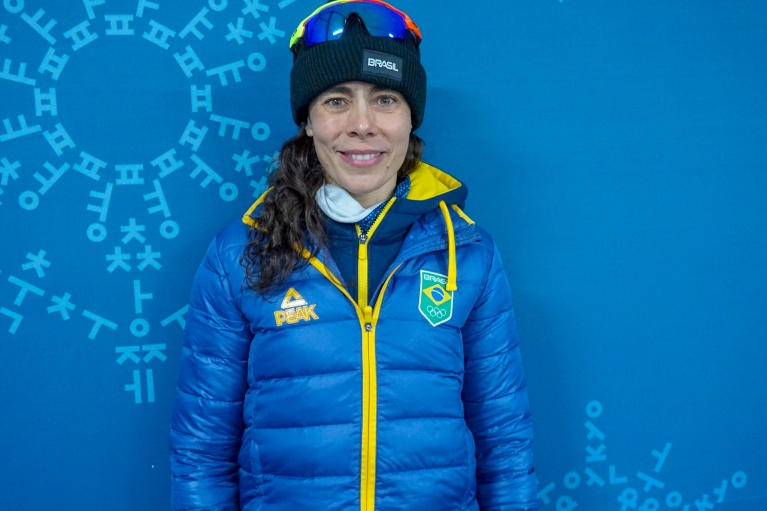

Personal information
- Born: 27 December 1975 (age 50) Belo Horizonte, Minas Gerais, Brazil
- Height: 5 ft 7 in (170 cm)
- Weight: 120 lb (54 kg)
- Spouse: Guido Visser
- Website: www.JaqueMourao.com

Sport
- Country: Brazil
- Sport: Biathlon, cross-country skiing, cycling
- Coached by: Guido Visser

Achievements and titles
- Olympic finals: 2004, 2006, 2008, 2010, 2014, 2018, 2020, 2022
Medal record
Representing Brazil
Women's mountain biking
Pan American Games
Bronze medal – third place	2019 Lima	Cross-country

Jaqueline Mourão (born 27 December 1975) is a Brazilian cyclist, biathlete and cross-country skier. Being an eight-time Olympian from 2004 to 2022, she is only one of two athletes, together with Ayumu Hirano, who participated in three consecutive Olympic Games in East Asia between 2018 and 2022, respectively in Pyeongchang, Tokyo, and Beijing, but also one of the two athletes, together with Montell Douglas, who participated in both of the Summer Olympics and Winter Olympics hosted by Beijing, respectively in 2008 and 2022.

Born and raised in the mountainous city of Belo Horizonte, she only began cross-country skiing at the age of 29 and competed in an XC-Ski race for the first time in December 2005. After only ten years of XC-Ski racing, in 2015, she was competitive enough to obtain three podiums in NorAm Cups.

She participated in five Winter Olympics — Torino (XC-Ski), Vancouver (XC-Ski), Sochi (XC-Ski & Biathlon), Pyeongchang (XC-Ski) and Beijing (XC-Ski) — as well as in three Summer Olympics, Athens (MTB), Beijing (MTB), and Tokyo (MTB). Jaqueline Mourão carried the Brazilian flag during the Closing Ceremony at the 2010 Vancouver Olympics and during the Opening Ceremony at the 2014 Sochi Olympics and the 2022 Beijing Olympics.

== Cross-country skiing results ==
All results are sourced from the International Ski Federation (FIS).

=== Olympic Games ===
Year	Age	10 km individual	15 km skiathlon	30 km mass start	Sprint	4 × 5 km relay	Team sprint
2006	30	67	—	—	—	—	—
2010	34	66	—	—	—	—	—
2014	38	—	—	—	64	—	—
2018	42	74	—	—	—	—	—
2022	46	82	—	—	84	—	23

=== World Championships ===
Year	Age	10 km individual	15 km skiathlon	30 km mass start	Sprint	4 × 5 km relay	Team sprint
2007	31	68	—	—	67	—	—
2009	33	—	66	54	76	—	—
2011	35	62	—	—	72	—	—
2013	37	75	—	—	—	—	—
2017	41	68	—	46	73	—	—
2019	43	—	—	—	75	—	—
2021	45	75	55	48	83	—	24
2023	47	63	—	—	74	—	24

=== World Cup ===
==== Season standings ====
Season	Age	Discipline standings			Ski Tour standings			
Season	Age	Overall	Distance	Sprint	Nordic Opening	Tour de Ski	World Cup Final	Ski Tour Canada
2010	34	NC	NC	—	—N/a	—	—	—N/a
2014	38	NC	—	NC	—	—	—	—N/a
2016	40	NC	NC	NC	—	—	—N/a	DNF
2017	41	NC	—	NC	—	—	DNF	—N/a
2021	45	NC	NC	—	—	—	—N/a	—N/a

Olympic Games
Preceded by Rodrigo Pessoa	Flagbearer for Brazil; Sochi 2014	Succeeded by Yane Marques
Preceded by Ketleyn Quadros; Bruno Rezende	Flagbearer for Brazil; Beijing 2022 with Edson Bindilatti	Succeeded by Raquel Kochhann; Isaquias Queiroz
