= Brazilian Olympic Committee =

- Country: Brazil
- Code: BRA
- Created: 8 June 1914
- Recognized: 8 June 1935
- Continental Association: PASO
- Headquarters: Rio de Janeiro, Brazil
- President: Marco Antônio La Porta
- Secretary General: Rogério Sampaio
- Website: cob.org.br

The Brazilian Olympic Committee (Portuguese: Comitê Olímpico do Brasil; COB) is the highest authority in Brazilian sport and the governing body of Brazilian Olympic sport. It was officially founded on 8 June 1914, but World War I caused its official activities to begin only in 1935. It was founded at the headquarters of the Brazilian Federation of Rowing Societies (Federação Brasileira das Sociedades de Remo) as an initiative from the Metropolitan League of Athletic Sports (Liga Metropolitana de Esportes Atléticos).

The BOC has multiple sources of income, but its principal means of funding is its 2% share of all the profits from the Brazilian National Lottery and other games of chance. The BOC is presided by Paulo Wanderley Teixeira, and its principal project is the 2016 Summer Olympics held in Rio de Janeiro.

== Attributions ==
The Brazilian Olympic Committee (BOC) is responsible for enrolling Brazilian athletes in every Olympic Games. The policy used by the institution is the "meritorious inclusion." This means that the BOC does not hold Olympic Trials; all Brazilian athletes who meet the requirements set forth by their sport's International Federation for participation in the Games are automatically enrolled by the BOC in their respective Olympic event. However, if the country has a limited number of berths in any given event in the Games and the number of athletes meeting the criteria for qualification exceeds it, the BOC will then respect the official rankings of the sport, or any other criterion used by the sport's Federation for ranking purposes, and enroll the top-ranked athletes to the limit of berths assigned to the country in the Games. National teams may qualify through pre-Olympic tournaments and/or international events that award berths in the Games; individual athletes, depending on their sport, may also qualify by achieving a certain minimum performance or time for the Games (e.g., in swimming, where athletes qualify when they swim their event in a certain time).

The BOC has a policy of never requesting "inclusion berths" in the Olympic Games: every country's Olympic Committee is entitled to request that the International Olympic Committee include athletes of that nationality in events to which they had not qualified, so long as the country in question had no athletes qualified when it had a right to enroll athletes in any given event; any national Olympic Committee may also request those berths if it has not reached the number of athletes that it had been assigned, which would cause the Olympic draws to diminish.

As an example, if no Brazilian athletes were to succeed in qualifying for the Olympic Weightlifting event, then no Brazilian athlete will participate in the given Olympics, because the BOC will not request the enrollment of any athlete that has not achieved qualification on his or her own merit. This could be observed, for instance, in the Weightlifting event of the 2004 Summer Games, when no Brazilian athlete participated, even though the BOC could have requested a special inclusion for representation purposes.

=== Olympic bids ===
The Brazilian Olympic Committee submitted official bids to host the Olympic Games. In Brazil, the BOC is the final authority for submitting a bid, and no Brazilian city may bid without BOC endorsement. Brasília made a bid for 2000, but withdrew early before the final election. The city of Rio de Janeiro had been the preferred candidate, having made bids for 1936, 2004 and 2012. The Rio bid was eventually accepted in 2009 to host the 2016 Summer Olympics on its fourth bid submission.

In 2004, when it was time to submit the bids for the 2012 games (ultimately awarded to London, Great Britain), the city of São Paulo contested the automatic choice of Rio de Janeiro as the natural Brazilian candidate. São Paulo insisted that it could produce a bid that would be more competitive than that of Rio de Janeiro. The BOC could only submit one national bid and decided to settle the issue internally by a vote of all registered members of the BOC. Both cities were required to present their bid for the Games (as if it were being presented to the IOC members) for evaluation by the delegates voting. The result was a landslide in favor of Rio de Janeiro, and the BOC then submitted the city's bid for the Games.

In 2017, The International Olympic Committee provisionally suspended Carlos Arthur Nuzman, president of the Brazilian Olympic Committee, in a vote-buying case to guarantee Rio de Janeiro as city host of the 2016 Summer Olympics.

== Confederations ==
Flag of the Brazilian Olympic Committee

The national sports confederations whose sports are part of the Olympic Program are directly linked to the BOC (National Olympic Committee). However, the BOC also collaborates with numerous "Associated Confederations", which are those whose sports are not currently included in the Olympic Program.

=== Directly linked ===
- Brazilian Archery Confederation
- Brazilian Associated Fighting Styles Confederation
- Brazilian Athletics Confederation
- Brazilian Aquatic Sports Confederation
- Brazilian Badminton Confederation
- Brazilian Baseball and Softball Confederation ^{†}
- Brazilian Basketball Confederation
- Brazilian Boxing Confederation
- Brazilian Canoeing Confederation
- Brazilian Ice Sports Federation
- Brazilian Cycling Confederation
- Brazilian Equestrian Confederation
- Brazilian Fencing Confederation
- Brazilian Football Confederation
- Brazilian Snow Sports Confederation
- Brazilian Grass and Indoor Hockey Confederation
- Brazilian Gymnastics Confederation
- Brazilian Handball Confederation
- Brazilian Judo Confederation
- Brazilian Modern Pentathlon Confederation
- Brazilian Rowing Confederation
- Brazilian Basketball Confederation
- Brazilian Sailing and Motors Sports Confederation
- Brazilian Shooting Confederation
- Brazilian Taekwondo Confederation
- Brazilian Table Tennis Confederation
- Brazilian Tennis Confederation
- Brazilian Triathlon Confederation
- Brazilian Volleyball Confederation
- Brazilian Weightlifting Confederation

^{†} In June 2005, the International Olympic Committee announced that both Baseball and Softball would be excluded from the Olympic Program as of the 2012 Summer Olympics, to be held in London, United Kingdom. At this point, no change in status for the Baseball and Softball Confederation has been announced.

=== Associated ===
- Brazilian Automobilist Confederation
- Brazilian Bodybuilding Confederation
- Brazilian Bowling Confederation
- Brazilian Capoeira Confederation
- Brazilian Confederation of College Sports
- Brazilian Confederation of Terrestrian Sports
- Brazilian Confederation of Fishing and Subaquatic Sports
- Brazilian Chess Confederation
- Brazilian Futsal Confederation
- Brazilian Golf Confederation
- Brazilian Roller hockey and Skating Confederation
- Brazilian Hunting Confederation
- Brazilian Jiu-Jitsu Confederation
- Brazilian Karate Confederation
- Brazilian Kung-fu and Wushu Confederation
- Brazilian Motorcycle Confederation
- Brazilian Mountain Biking Confederation
- Brazilian Parasailing Association
- Brazilian Parachuting Confederation
- Brazilian Squash Confederation
- Brazilian Surfing Confederation
- Brazilian Hiking Confederation
- Brazilian Water Skiing Confederation

== See also ==
- Brazil at the Olympics
- Brazilian Paralympic Committee
